= Internet in Afghanistan =

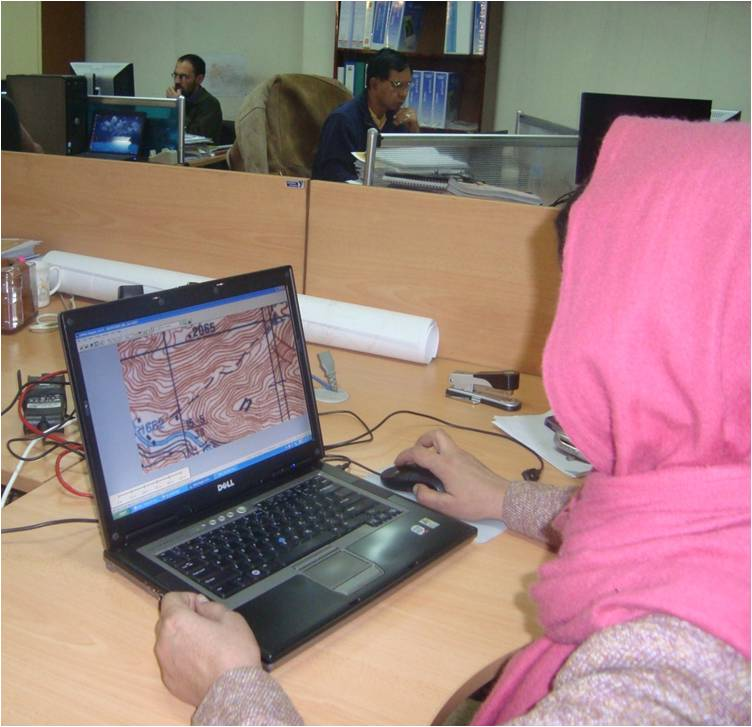
Internet users at the Polytechnical University of Kabul in Afghanistan

Afghanistan has a history of internet usage, though under the Taliban governments it has sometimes been subject to broad shutdowns. The internet had officially become available in 2002 during the presidency of Hamid Karzai. Prior to that year, it was prohibited because the Islamic Emirate of Afghanistan believed that it may be used to broadcast obscene, immoral and anti-Islamic material, and because the few internet users at the time could not be easily monitored as they obtained their telephone lines from neighboring Pakistan.

As of 2025, internet access has expanded to nearly all urban centers, though service is limited in rural areas. Despite widespread availability, the Taliban government has intermittently restricted access to certain social media platforms.

Afghanistan was given legal control of the ".af" domain in 2003, and the Afghanistan Network Information Center (AFGNIC) was established to administer domain names. The Ministry of Communications and Information Technology (MCIT), charged a newly created independent company called Afghan Telecom with spinning off all telecommunications operations and services. Up from five functional internet service providers (ISPs) in 2003, Afghanistan supported twenty-two internet hosts and seven main ISPs, and a growing number of internet cafés and telekiosks (public access points located in post offices and at Kabul International Airport). The country currently has around 6,000 .af domains.

Afghans have long recognized the internet as an important source of growth and development for the country, believing that information and communication technologies can create opportunities for disadvantaged groups and improve the access of the rural poor to markets. In November 2006, the MCIT contracted a Chinese firm (ZTE) for the establishment optical fiber cable network in the country. The price of internet gradually began reducing in the late 2010s. 3G services began in the country in 2012 and are provided by all major telecommunication companies, including Afghan Telecom, Afghan Wireless, Etisalat, MTN Group, Roshan, and Salaam Network. 4G services became available as of 2017.

== History ==
In the 1990s, Afghanistan was almost completely offline due to war and later banned from the internet by the Taliban. During this time, Afghan websites were developed mostly by the Afghan diaspora in the west, including the first Afghan web directory, afghana.com, which launched in 1999 and provided a directory of local and international Afghan-related websites, Afghanistan maps, businesses, historical documents, chat services, email services, books, etc. After collapse of the Taliban, there was an exponential growth of both ISPs and websites, fueled by governmental and non-governmental organizations as well as private enterprises. After the Taliban regained control of the government in 2021, they did not ban the internet as they did in the 1990s. They did, however, ban certain applications such as TikTok.

== Legal and regulatory frameworks ==
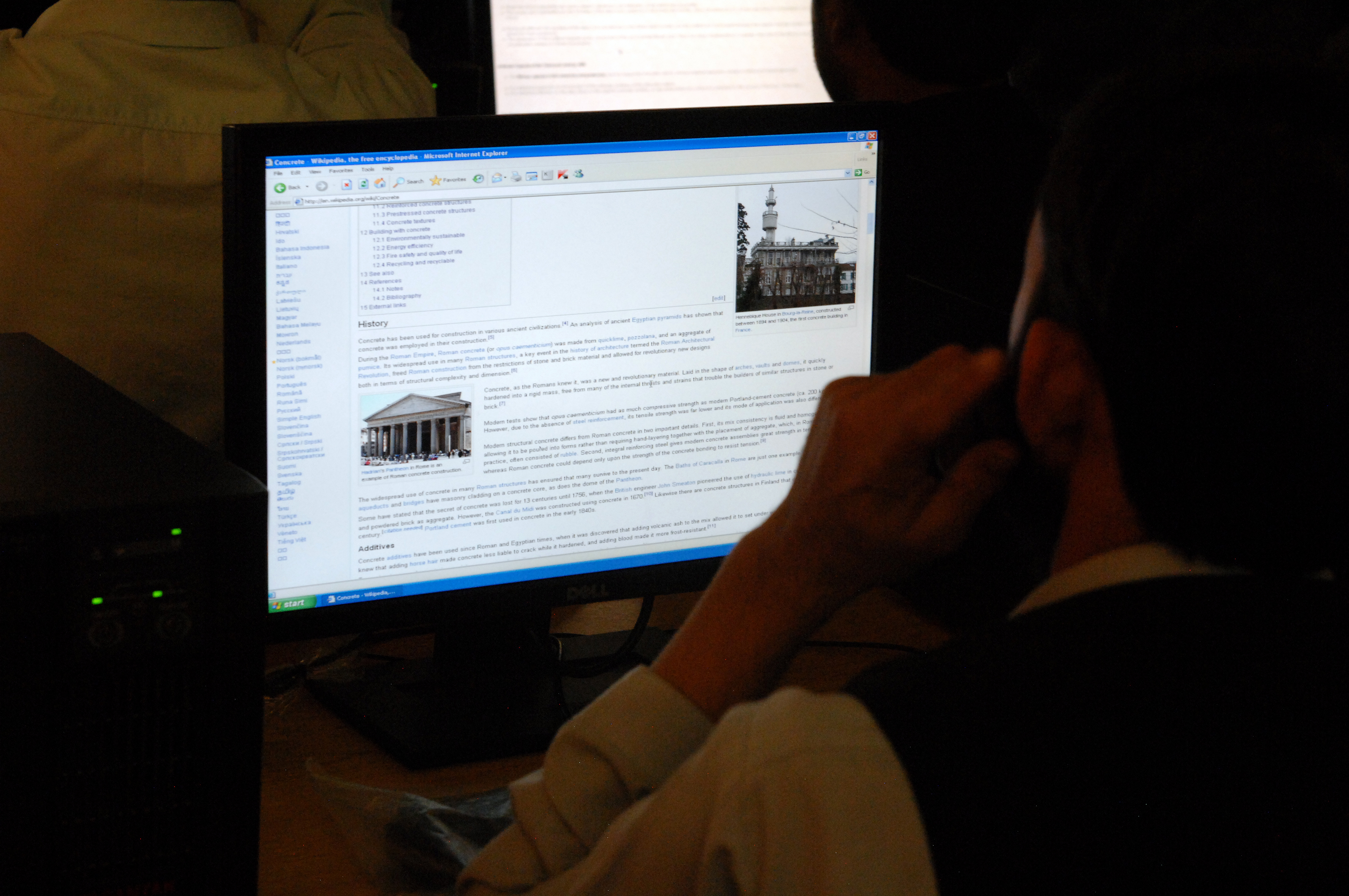
Internet user at Kandahar University in the south of the country

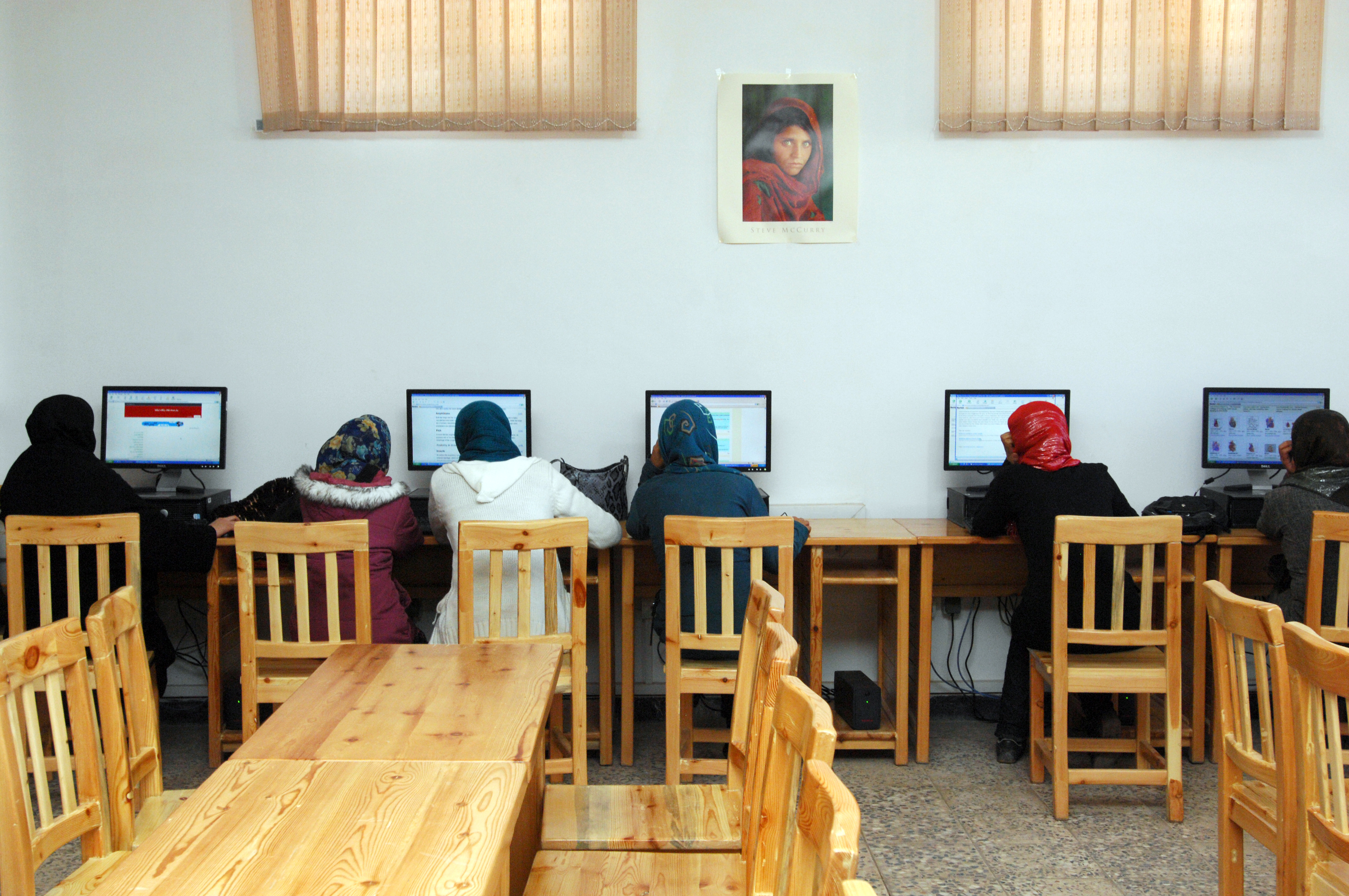
Female students using the internet at Herat University in western Afghanistan

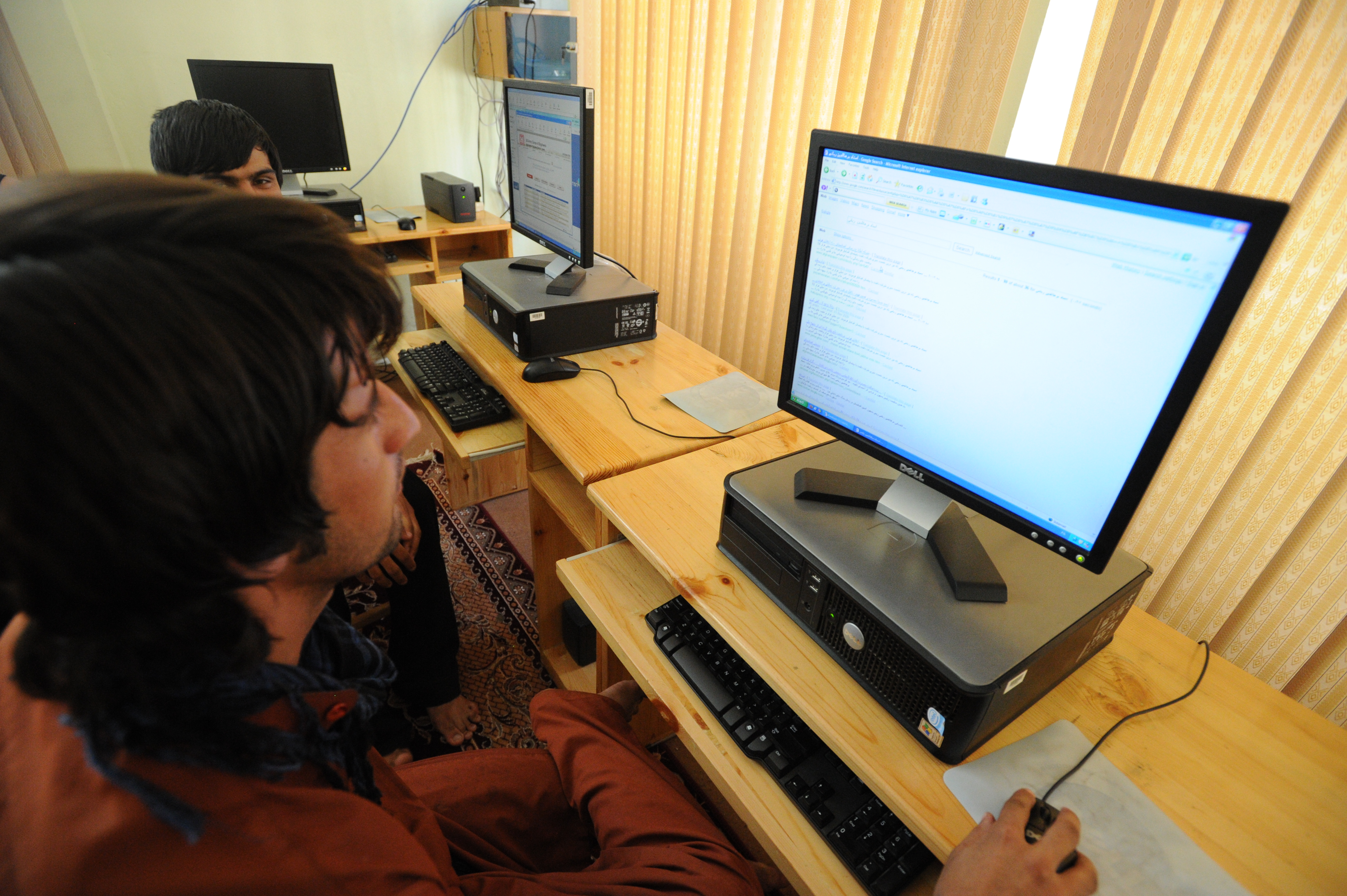
Afghans using internet in Kunduz Province, in northern Afghanistan

=== Legal rights to freedom of expression and its limits ===
Freedom of expression was inviolable under the Constitution of the Islamic Republic of Afghanistan, and every Afghan had the right to print or publish topics without prior submission to state authorities in accordance with the law. However, the normative limit of the law was clear: under the Constitution no law could be contrary to the beliefs and provisions of the sacred religion of Islam. Mass media law had become increasingly attentive to more vigorous adherence to this principle. The Media Law decreed by President Hamid Karzai in December 2005, just before the national legislature was formed, included a ban on four broad content categories: the publication of news contrary to Islam and other religions; slanderous or insulting materials concerning individuals; matters contrary to the Afghan Constitution or criminal law; and the exposure of the identities of victims of violence. A draft amendment of the law circulating in 2006 added four additional proscribed categories: content jeopardizing the stability, national security, and territorial integrity of Afghanistan; false information that might disrupt public opinion; promotion of any religion other than Islam; and "material which might damage physical well-being, psychological and moral security of people, especially children and the youth".

=== Independence of the media ===
The independence of the media was also brought into question by the March 2004 Media Law enacted by the transitional government, which handed the Minister of Culture and Information important veto powers (e.g., foreign agencies and international organizations may print news bulletins only after obtaining permission from the Minister) and leadership of a Media Evaluation Commission that reviews appeals of rejections of licenses by the Ministry of Information and Culture. The proposed amendment to the Media Law in late 2006 dissolved the Media Evaluation Commission and two other regulatory bodies, the National Commission of Radio and Television Broadcast, and an investigation commission that reviewed complaints against journalists and decided which cases should be forwarded to courts for prosecution.

=== Telecommunications services and their regulation ===
With the approval of the Telecommunications Services Regulation Act in 2005 (Telecom Law), an independent regulatory agency called the Afghanistan Telecom Regulatory Authority (TRA) was created out of the merger of the Telecommunications Regulatory Board and the State Radio Inspection Department (SRID) under the Ministry of Communications. The TRA assumed responsibility for telecommunications licensing as well as promoting sustainable competition for all telecommunications services.

Licensing requirements are straightforward: companies must abide by the law to be licensed by the TRA, and only those with licenses can sell telecommunications services. Of the two types of ISP licenses, transit and national licenses, only transit licenses allow ISPs to establish international connectivity. Part of the TRA mandate is to protect users from the abuse of monopoly market share: companies determined to have “significant market power” must apply to have an amended license and are subject to additional penalties for anti-competitive behavior. A license may be revoked if the licensee has broken the law or has failed to fix repeated breaches in the agreement, has misleading/false information in their application, or does not pay the fee even after a warning.

Under the Telecom Law, ISPs are duty-bound to protect user information and confidentiality. However, the TRA is also authorized to demand the operator or service provider to monitor communications between users as well as Internet traffic to trace “harassing, offensive, or illegal” telecommunications, although what constitutes these prohibited communications is not specified. Where an issue of national security or a criminal case is involved, operators and service providers must hand over the required information and give the authorities immediate access to their network. In cases where no such immediate need exists, the TRA still has the right to “relevant information” as long as the TRA has given two weeks’ notice. In its Acceptable Use Policy, the AFGNIC prohibits the use of the “.af” domain to make any communications to commit a criminal offense; racially vilify others; violate intellectual property rights; and distribute, publish, or link to pornographic materials that a “reasonable person as a member of the community of Afghanistan would consider to be obscene or indecent”. The ban on spam or junk mail also includes unsolicited political or religious tracts along with commercial advertising and other information.

=== Security and intelligence ===
On June 12, 2006, the National Directorate of Security (NDS), Afghanistan's national intelligence agency, issued a list of broadcasting and publishing activities that “must be banned” in light of heightened security problems that could deteriorate public morale. The list of proscribed press activities was quite extensive and attributed negative intention, causality, and morality to reporting on specific issues (primarily terrorism and the Taliban insurgency). President Karzai denied these were instructions, saying they were merely guidelines and a request for media cooperation. Restricted activities included the publication or broadcasting of exaggerated reports against national unity or peace; decrees, statements and interviews of armed organizations and terrorist groups; and even the proscription against news on terrorism serving as the lead story.

OpenNet Initiative testing found no evidence of filtering in Afghanistan, although testing was not as extensive there as it was in some other countries.

== Statistics and services ==
The Internet is available in all 34 provinces of Afghanistan. The country currently has 9,237,489 regular internet users. According to a 2020 estimate, over 7 million residents, which is roughly 18% of the population, had access to the internet. It was reported in 2010 that Kabul, Jalalabad and Khost had the most internet users. The country has 327,000 IP addresses, 23,000,000 mobile cellular telephone subscriptions and around 6,000 .af domains.

Nearly all popular online services and over five million websites are available in Afghanistan, including Facebook, Google, Instagram, MSN, Netflix, Archive.org, PayPal, PlayStation Network, Skype, TikTok, Twitter, Discord, Google Play, Newgrounds, Tumblr, Wikipedia, Messenger, Hugging Face, Fandom, Viber, Signal, Threads, LinkedIn, ABC, ABC News, WhatsApp, SoundCloud, Flickr, Pinterest, Dictionary.com, The Free Dictionary, Yahoo!, Miniclip, Nitrome, ChatGPT, Copilot, DeviantArt, BBC, Tenor, YouTube, Dailymotion, Vimeo, Disney+, Hulu, Blogger, Dreamstime, Shutterstock, Archive of Our Own, Nico Video, GitHub, TinEye, Scratch, IQIYI, Reddit, and Zoom. Around 4,423,600 Facebook users were reported in the country.

In early 2011, Paywast (in Dari پیوست ), a local mobile social network was launched. It is based on mobile, and its users connect with their friends and create groups and communities through SMS. With more than half of the Afghan population owning a mobile phone, Paywast is believed to have more than a million users across Afghanistan. The social network is available on the AWCC, Etisalat, and MTN GSM networks.

=== Internet service providers ===
The following are some of the internet service providers in Afghanistan:

- Afghan Cyber
- AfghaNet
- Afghan ICT Solution
- Afghanistan Faiz Satellite Communication (AFSAT)
- Afghan Telecom
- Afghan Wireless
- Ariana Network Services
- Aryan Technologies
- Asan Network Services
- CeReTechs
- Eitisalat
- Giganet
- Giganor
- Hewad ICT Solutions
- Insta Telecom
- IO Global Services Limited (IOG)
- Liwal Telecommunications LLC
- Movj Technology
- Neda Telecom
- Noor Telecom
- North Telecom
- Rahanet
- RANA Technologies
- ROSHAN
- Stan Telecom
- TriStar Internet
- Unique Atlantic Telecommunication LTD
- Vizocom

== Censorship ==
In April 2024, the Taliban government announced plans to restrict or block access to Facebook in Afghanistan. The Minister of Communications, Najibullah Haqqani, stated that the ministry had completed a plan to limit or entirely block access to specific social platforms, including Facebook.

Despite these announcements, as of August 2025, Facebook remains accessible in Afghanistan. However, the government's intentions to restrict or block access to the platform have raised concerns among media freedom advocates. The Committee to Protect Journalists (CPJ) expressed alarm over the Taliban's plans, emphasizing that such actions would further impede the free flow of information in the country.

To circumvent potential restrictions, many Afghan internet users turn to Virtual Private Networks (VPNs). VPN usage has surged globally, allowing individuals to bypass internet censorship and access blocked content.

On 15 September 2025, the Taliban’s supreme leader Hibatullah Akhundzada issued a ban on fibre-optic network and WiFi services in Afghanistan to ‘prevent immorality’, specifically in Balkh, Kandahar, Uruzgan Province, Zabul Province, and Nimruz Province, although Taliban officials intend to impose the ban nationwide. On 16 September, Director of Information Sediqullah Quraishi confirmed that internet connection was cut in Nangarhar. As stated by Taliban officials, internet access on cell phone data would still be available, although deemed unreliable and costly. This was followed up with a shutdown until further notice ordered by Hibatullah on 29 September, who said the internet was unnecessary and had been banned by Mullah Omar with good results. However, the ban was reversed on October 1, without any explanation. According to BBC News, cabinet ministers including Abdul Ghani Baradar, Sirajuddin Haqqani and Mullah Yaqoob gathered at the prime minister's office and managed to convince Prime Minister Hasan Akhund to turn the internet back on, leading Akhundzada to back down.

== See also ==
- Communications in Afghanistan
- Education in Afghanistan
- Mass media in Afghanistan
