= List of companies of Afghanistan =

Location of Afghanistan

Afghanistan is a landlocked country located within South Asia and Central Asia.

Afghanistan is a developing country. As of 2014, the nation's GDP stands at about $60.58 billion with an exchange rate of $20.31 billion, and the GDP per capita is $1,900. The country's exports totaled $2.7 billion in 2012. Its unemployment rate was reported in 2008 at about 35%. According to a 2009 report, about 42% of the population lives on less than $1 a day. The nation has less than $1.5 billion in external debt.

The Afghan economy has been growing at about 10% per year in the last decade, which is due to the infusion of over $50 billion in international aid and remittances from Afghan expats. It is also due to improvements made to the transportation system and agricultural production, which is the backbone of the nation's economy.

== Notable firms ==
This list includes notable companies with primary headquarters located in the country. The industry and sector follow the Industry Classification Benchmark taxonomy. Organizations which have ceased operations are included and noted as defunct.

Notable companies Status: P=Private, S=State; A=Active, D=Defunct
Name	Industry	Sector	Headquarters	Founded	Notes	Status	
Afghan Film	Consumer services	Broadcasting & entertainment	Kabul	1968	State run film	S	A
Afghan Telecom	Telecommunications	Fixed line telecommunications	Kabul	2005		P	A
Afghan Wireless	Telecommunications	Mobile telecommunications	Kabul	1998		P	A
Afghanistan International Bank	Financials	Banks	Kabul	2004	Commercial bank	P	A
Ariana Afghan Airlines	Consumer services	Airlines	Kabul	1955	State-owned, national airline	S	A
Ariana TV	Consumer services	Broadcasting & entertainment	Kabul	2005	Television	P	A
AZ Corporation	Industrials	Building materials & fixtures	Kabul	2001	Construction	P	A
Azizi Bank	Financials	Banks	Kabul	2006	Bank	P	A
Bakhtar Afghan Airlines	Consumer services	Airlines	Kabul	1967	Airline, defunct 1988	P	D
Bakhtar News Agency	Consumer services	Broadcasting & entertainment	Kabul	1939	Government-owned news agency	S	A
Bank-e-Millie Afghan	Financials	Banks	Kabul	1933	Bank	P	A
Da Afghanistan Bank	Financials	Banks	Kabul	1939	Central bank	S	A
East Horizon Airlines	Consumer services	Airlines	Kabul	2013	Airline	P	A
First MicroFinance Bank-Afghanistan	Financials	Banks	Kabul	2004	Microfinance lending bank	P	A
Kam Air	Consumer services	Airlines	Kabul	2003	Airline	P	A
Khaama Press	Consumer services	Publishing	Kabul	2010	Online newspaper	P	A
Khyber Afghan Airlines	Industrials	Industrial transportation	Jalalabad	2001	Cargo airline	P	A
Moby Media Group	Consumer services	Broadcasting & entertainment	Kabul	2002		P	A
New Kabul Bank	Financials	Banks	Kabul	2004	Bank	P	A
Pajhwok Afghan News	Consumer services	Broadcasting & entertainment	Kabul	2003	News agency	P	A
Pamir Airways	Consumer services	Airlines	Kabul	1994	Private airline, defunct 2011	P	D
Pashtany Bank	Financials	Banks	Kabul	1954	National Afghan Corporation (government-owned)	S	A
Rana Institute of Higher Studies	Consumer services	-	Kabul	2009	Private university	P	A
Roshan	Telecommunications	Mobile telecommunications	Kabul	2003	Controlled by the Agha Khan	P	A
Safi Airways	Consumer services	Airlines	Kabul	2006	Private airline	P	A
Watan Group	Conglomerate	-	Kabul	2002	Oil & gas, mining, telecommunications	P	A

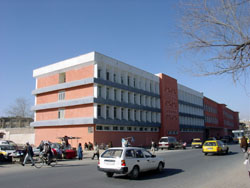
Afghan Ministry of Finance in Kabul.

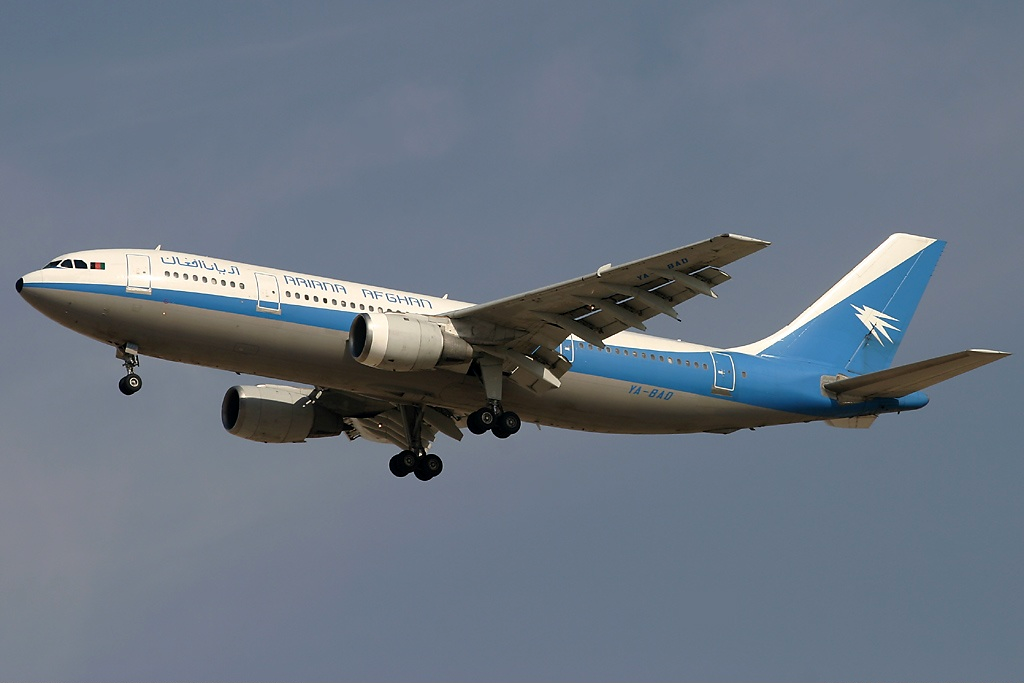
An Ariana Afghan Airlines Airbus A300B4-200 on approach to Dubai International Airport.

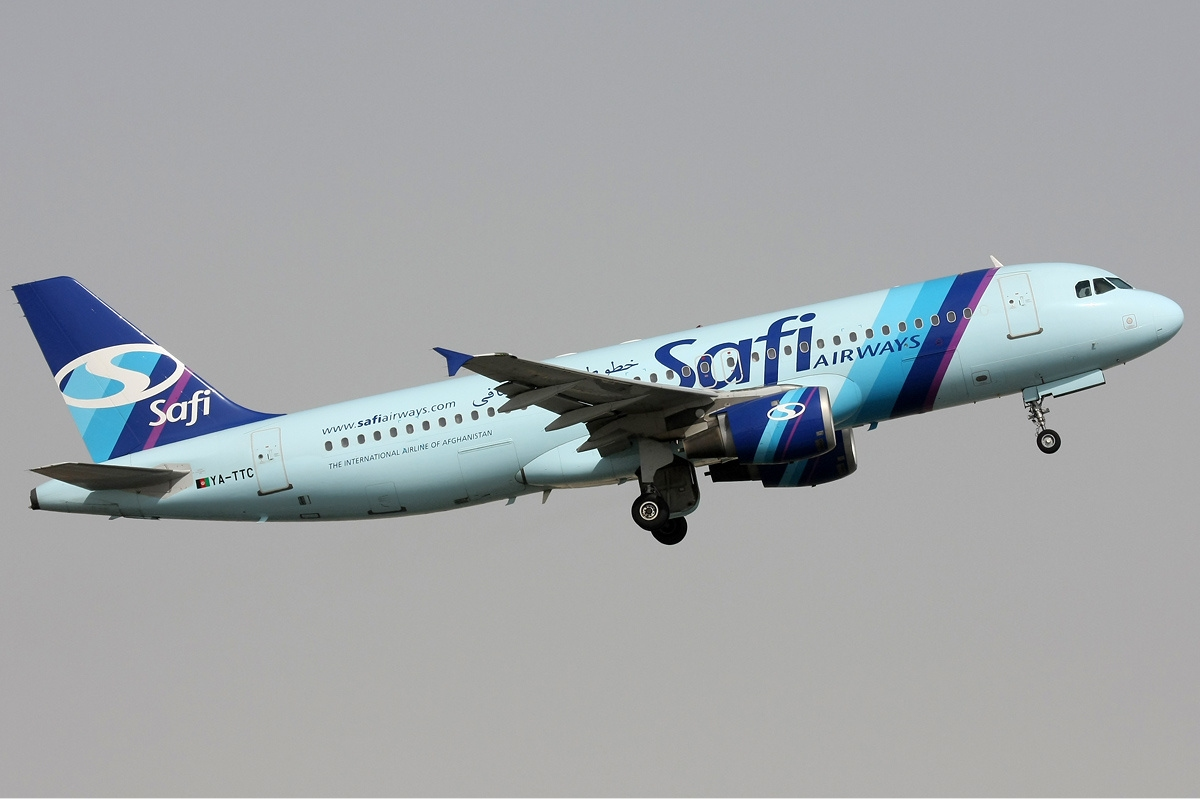
A Safi Airways Airbus A320 departs Dubai International Airport, United Arab Emirates.

== See also ==
- Economy of Afghanistan
- List of television channels in Afghanistan
