= Telephone numbers in Afghanistan =

- Country: Afghanistan
- Continent: Asia
- Numbering plan type: closed
- Format: +93 XX XXX XXXX
- Country code: +93
- International access: 00
- Long-distance: 0

== Fixed (landline) codes ==
Area codes in Afghanistan are two digits long. It is common to write phone numbers as (0xx) yyy-yyyy, where xx is the area code. The 0 prefix is for long-distance dialing from within the country. International callers should dial +93 xx yyyyyyy.

Area codes for common cities are:

- 020 yyy yyyy: Kabul
- 026 yyy yyyy: Daykundi
- 030 yyy yyyy: Kandahar
- 040 yyy yyyy: Herat
- 050 yyy yyyy: Mazar-i-Sharif
- 060 yyy yyyy: Jalalabad
- 070 yyy yyyy: Gardez

== Mobile phone codes ==
There are six mobile phone companies currently operating in Afghanistan. Mobile phone numbers are written as (0xx yyy-yyyy), where xx is the code. The 0 prefix is for dialing from within the country. International callers should dial +93 xx yyy yyyy.

Some of the mobile phone codes are:

AWCC

- 070 yyy yyyy
- 071 yyy yyyy

Roshan (TDC)

- 079 yyy yyyy
- 072 yyy yyyy

Etisalat Afghanistan

- 078 yyy yyyy
- 073 yyy yyyy

ATOMA (formerly MTN Afghanistan)

- 077 yyy yyyy
- 076 yyy yyyy

Salaam

- 074 yyy yyyy

Afghan Telecom (CMDA)

- 075 yyy yyyy

Wasl

- 07* yyy yyyy

== See also ==
- Communications in Afghanistan
- Mobile Network Code
