= Communications in Afghanistan =

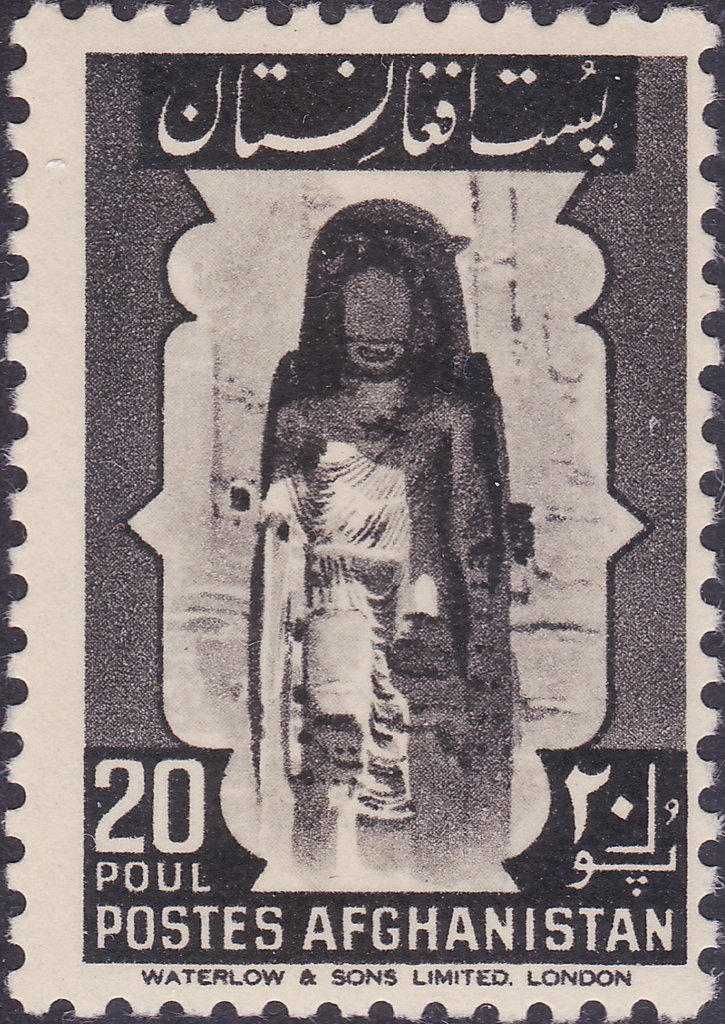
Bamiyan themed postage stamp (1951) issued by Postes Afghanes (Afghan Post)

Communications in Afghanistan is under the control of the Ministry of Communications and Information Technology (MCIT). It has rapidly expanded after the Karzai administration was formed in late 2001, and has embarked on wireless companies, internet, radio stations and television channels.

The Afghan government signed a $64.5 million agreement in 2006 with China's ZTE on the establishment of a countrywide optical fiber telecommunications network. The project began to improve telephone, internet, television and radio services throughout Afghanistan. About 90% of the country's population had access to communication services by the end of 2013.

Afghanistan uses its own space satellite called Afghansat 1. There are about 18 million mobile phone users in the country. Telecom companies include Afghan Telecom, Afghan Wireless, Etisalat, MTN, Roshan, Salaam. Around 20% of the population has access to the Internet.

== Internet ==
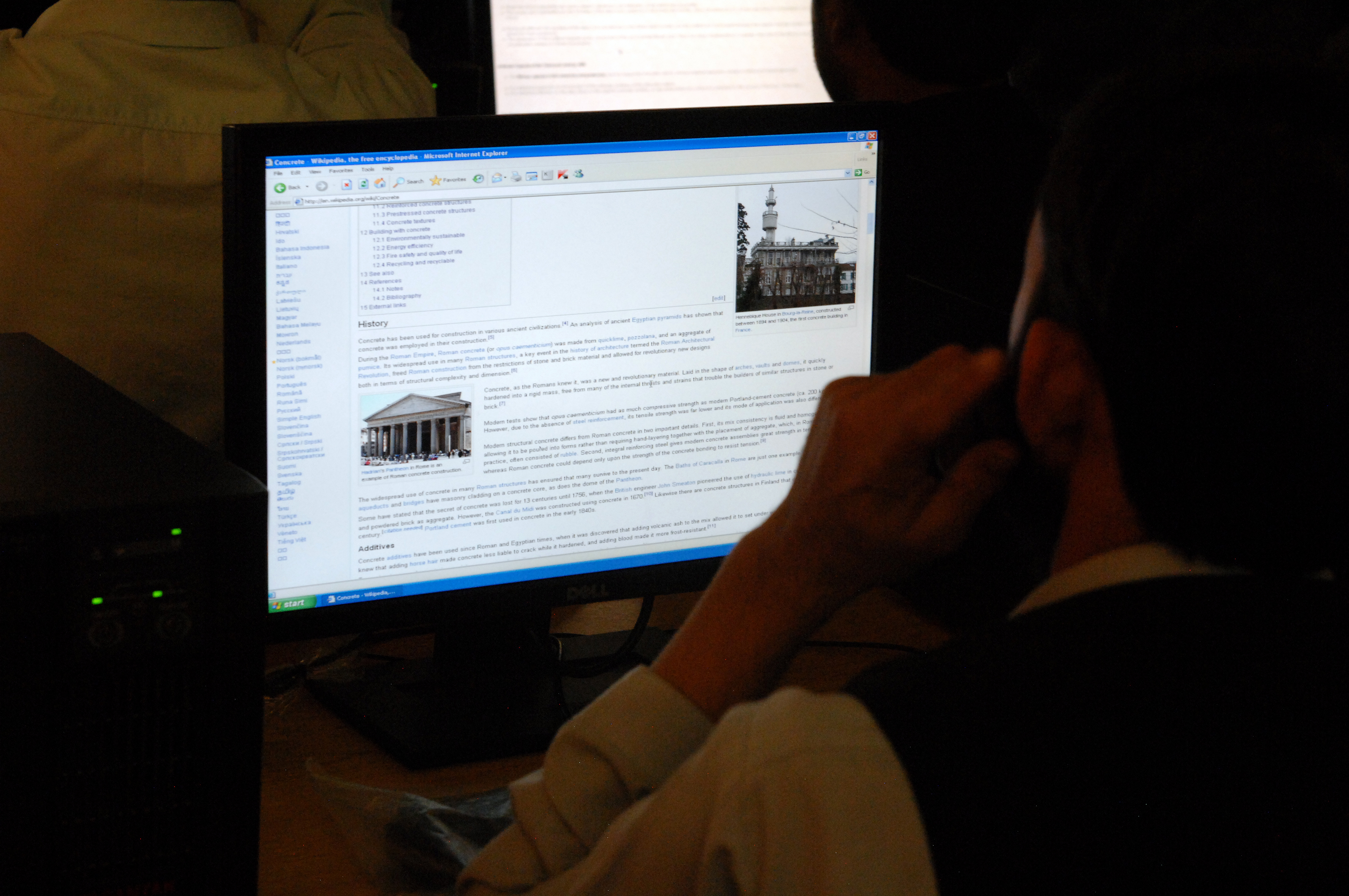
Internet user at Kandahar University

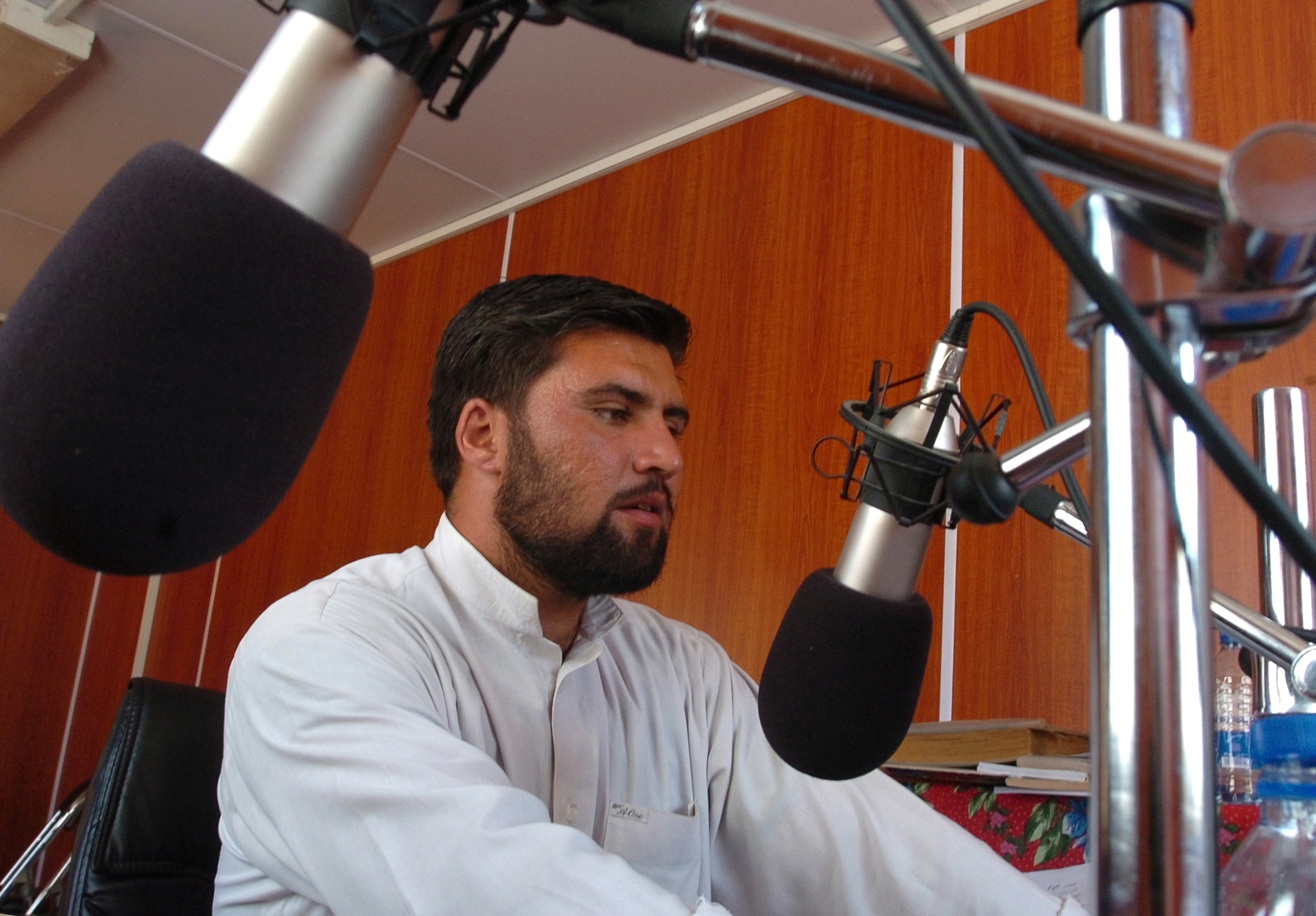
Afghani broadcaster on Kala Gush Radio sending communications out across Nuristan province, Afghanistan

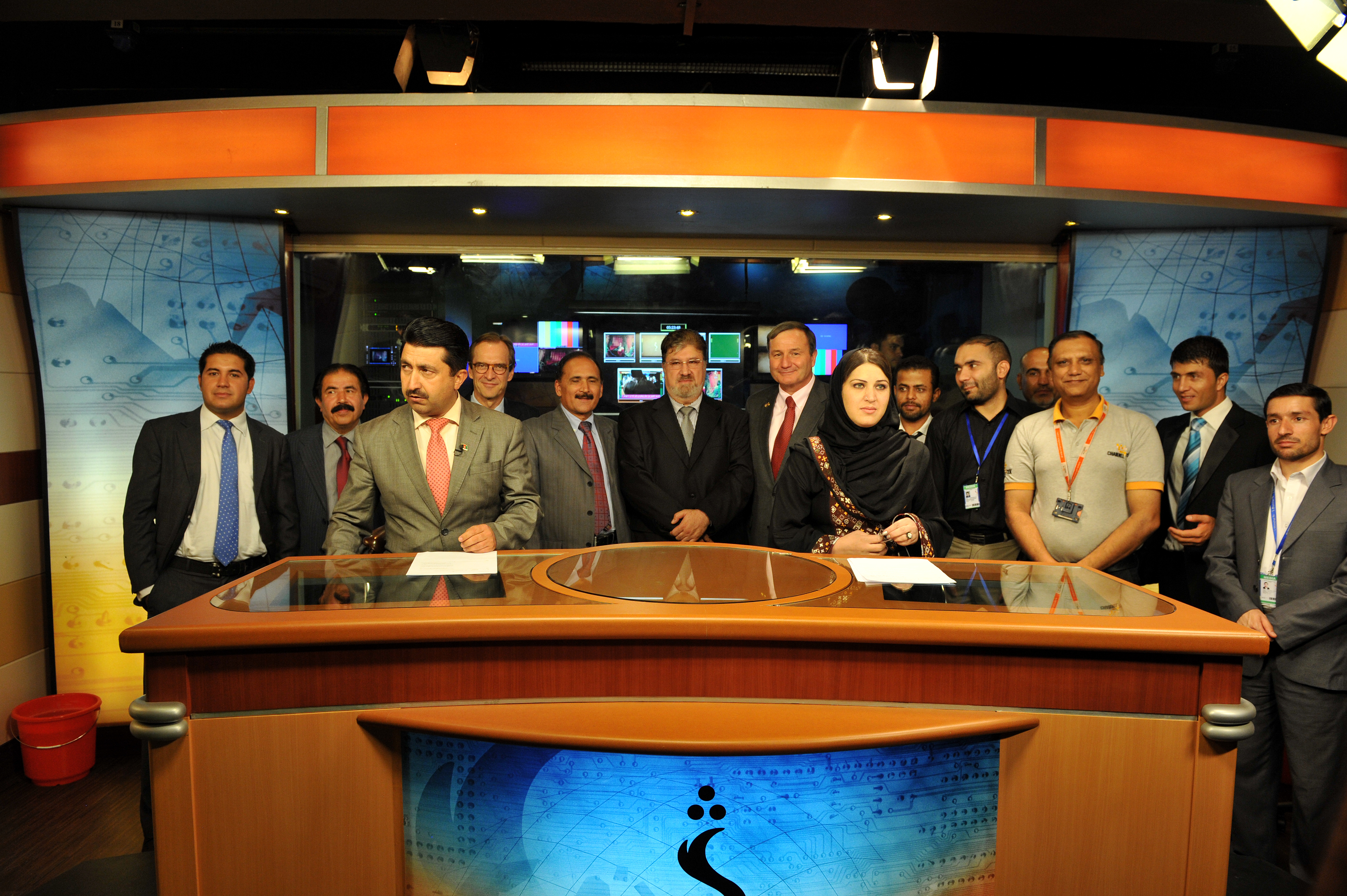
Shamshad TV studio began transmitting in 2005 and mainly broadcasts in Pashto language

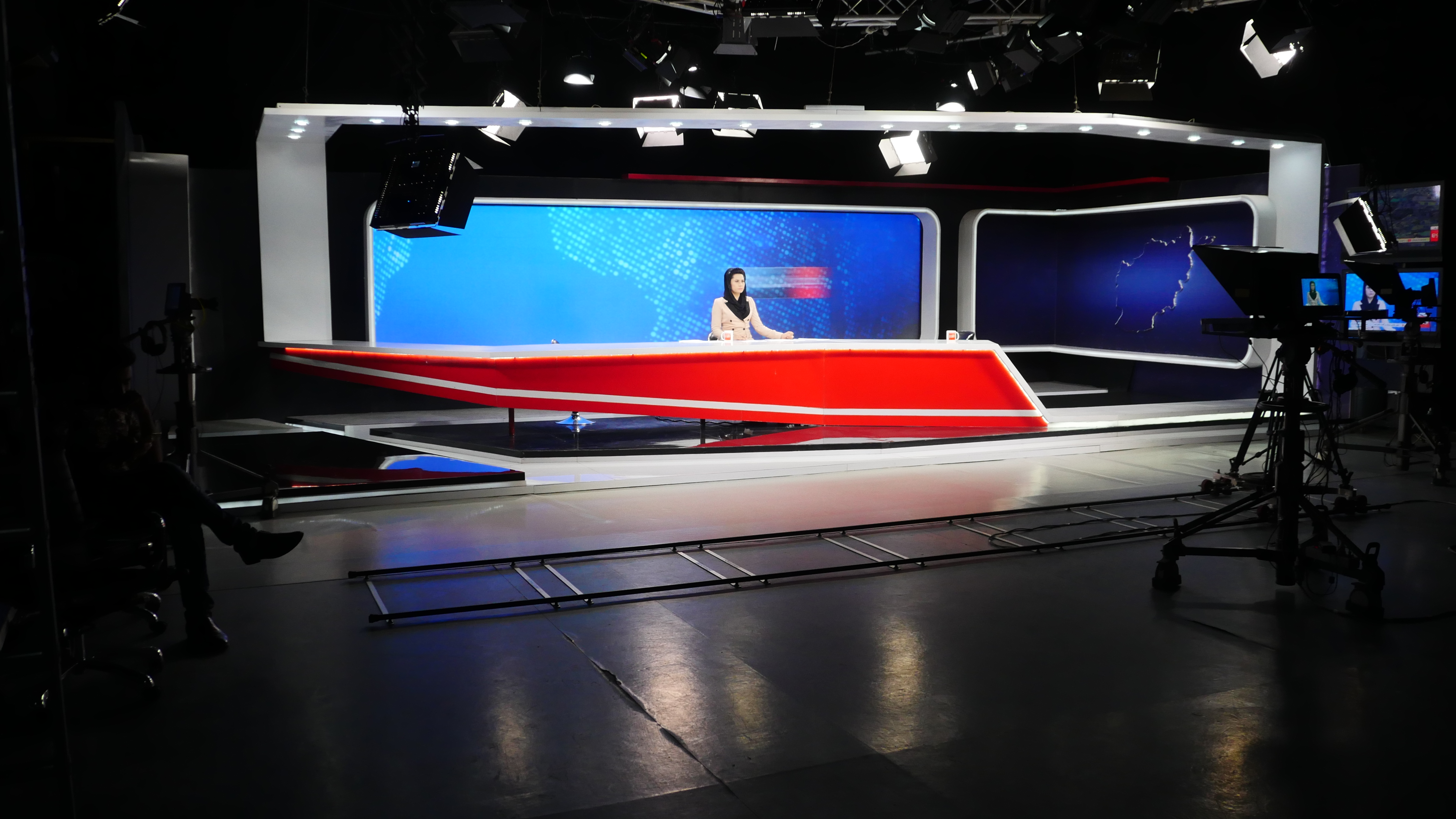
Studio of TOLOnews, a twenty-four hour Afghan news channel launched in August 2010, broadcasting from Kabul, Afghanistan

Afghanistan was given legal control of the ".af" domain in 2003, and the Afghanistan Network Information Center (AFGNIC) was established to administer domain names. The country has 327,000 IP addresses and around 6,000 .af domains. Internet in Afghanistan is accessed by over 9 million users today. According to a 2020 estimate, over 7 million residents, which is roughly 18% of the population, had access to the internet. There are over a dozen different internet service providers in Afghanistan.

== Postal service ==
In 1870, a central post office was established at Bala Hissar in Kabul and a post office in the capital of each province. The service was slowly being expanded over the years as more postal offices were established in each large city by 1918. Afghanistan became a member of the Universal Postal Union in 1928, and the postal administration elevated to the Ministry of Communication in 1934. Civil war caused a disruption in issuing official stamps during the 1980s–90s war but in 1999 postal service was operating again. Postal services to/from Kabul worked remarkably well all throughout the war years. Postal services to/from Herat resumed in 1997. The Afghan government has reported to the UPU several times about illegal stamps being issued and sold in 2003 and 2007.

Afghanistan Post has been reorganizing the postal service in 2000s with assistance from Pakistan Post. The Afghanistan Postal commission was formed to prepare a written policy for the development of the postal sector, which will form the basis of a new postal services law governing licensing of postal services providers. The project was expected to finish by 2008.

== Radio ==
Radio broadcasting in Afghanistan began in 1925 with Radio Kabul being the first station. The country currently has over 200 AM, FM and shortwave radio stations. They broadcast in Dari, Pashto, English, Uzbeki and a number of other languages.

== Satellite ==
In January 2014 the Afghan Ministry of Communications and Information Technology signed an agreement with Eutelsat for the use of satellite resources to enhance deployment of Afghanistan's national broadcasting and telecommunications infrastructure as well as its international connectivity. Afghansat 1 was officially launched in May 2014, with expected service for at least seven years in Afghanistan. The Afghan government plans to launch Afghansat 2 after the lease of Afghansat 1 ends.

== Telephone ==
According to 2013 statistics, there were 20,521,585 GSM mobile phone subscribers and 177,705 CDMA subscribers in Afghanistan. Mobile communications have improved because of the introduction of wireless carriers. The first was Afghan Wireless and the second Roshan, which began providing services to all major cities within Afghanistan. There are also a number of VSAT stations in major cities such as Kabul, Kandahar, Herat, Mazari Sharif, and Jalalabad, providing international and domestic voice/data connectivity. The international calling code for Afghanistan is +93. The following is a partial list of mobile phone companies in the country:

- Afghan Telecom (provides 4G services)
- Afghan Wireless (provides 4G services)
- Etisalat (provides 4G services)
- MTN Group (provides 4G services)
- Roshan (provides 4G services)
- Salaam Network (provides 3G services)

All the companies providing communication services are obligated to deliver 2.5% of their income to the communication development fund annually. According to the Ministry of Communication and Information Technology there are 4760 active towers throughout the country which covers 85% of the population. The Ministry of Communication and Information Technology plans to expand its services in remote parts of the country where the remaining 15% of the population will be covered with the installation of 700 new towers. According to WikiLeaks, phone calls in Afghanistan have been monitored by the National Security Agency.

== Television ==
There are over 106 television operators in Afghanistan and 320 television transmitters, many of which are based Kabul, while others are broadcast from other provinces. Selected foreign channels are also shown to the public in Afghanistan, but with the use of the internet, over 3,500 international TV channels may be accessed in Afghanistan.
