= Telecom Development Company Afghanistan =

Telecommunications consortium in Afghanistan

- Industry: Telecommunications
- Headquarters: Afghanistan

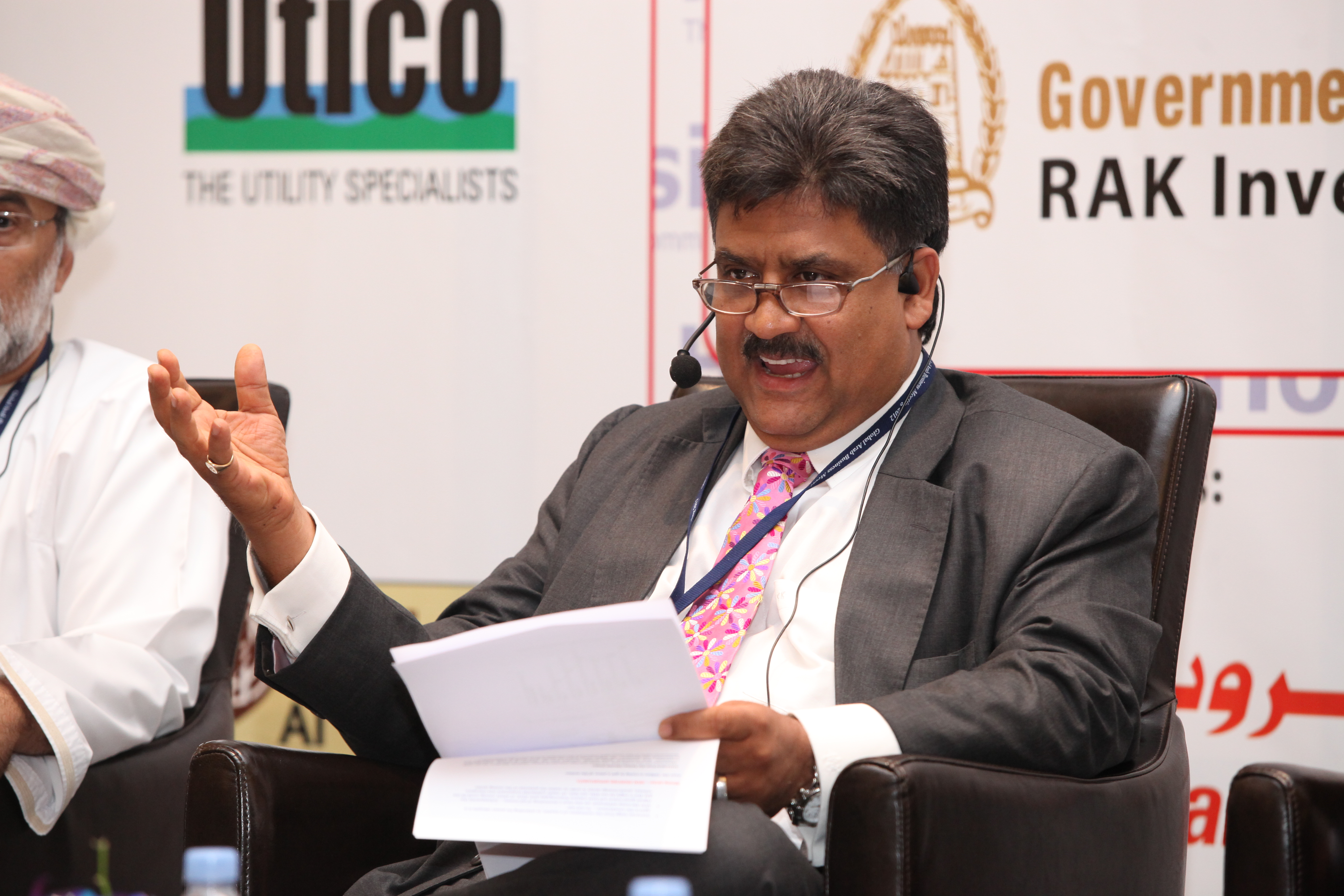
Karim Khoja, CEO of Telecom Development Company Afghanistan at the Horasis Global Arab Business Meeting in 2012

Telecom Development Company Afghanistan (TDCA) is a telecommunications consortium in Afghanistan. Its projects include Roshan, the brand name for their GSM services. The consortium is led by Aga Khan Fund for Economic Development and consists of Monaco Telecom International and Swedish telecommunications multinational Telia Company.

== See also ==
- Communications in Afghanistan
- Roshan (telco)
