= Postage stamps and postal history of Afghanistan =

This is a survey of the postage stamps and postal history of Afghanistan.

== First stamps ==
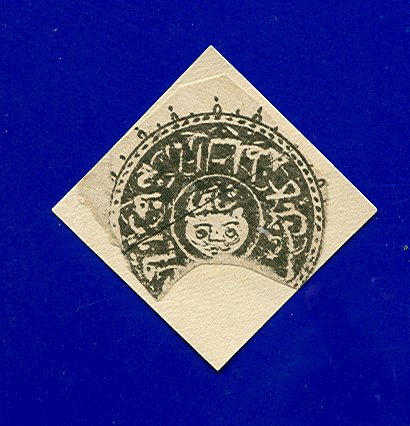
A stamp marked "Kingdom of Kabul"

The first stamps appeared in 1871. They were round in shape, imperforate, and printed in black, with a crude lion's head, surrounded by Arabic script specifying one of three denominations. The lion, sher, represented the head of state, Sher Ali Khan, as he had been named for the bravery of a lion. Many catalogues and early collectors incorrectly referred to these as "tiger" heads. Cancellation was accomplished by cutting or tearing off a piece of the stamp. Cancellation by postmark was not introduced until 1891. Initially somewhat large, subsequent issues kept the same basic design but were smaller each year, with the last appearing in 1878. Starting in 1876, the stamps were printed in different colors, each color corresponding to one of the main post offices on the Peshawar-Kabul-Khulm route. Each design in a sheet was individually engraved, so the stamps vary considerably in appearance. Many of the Sher Ali issues are readily available, while some sell for hundreds of US$.

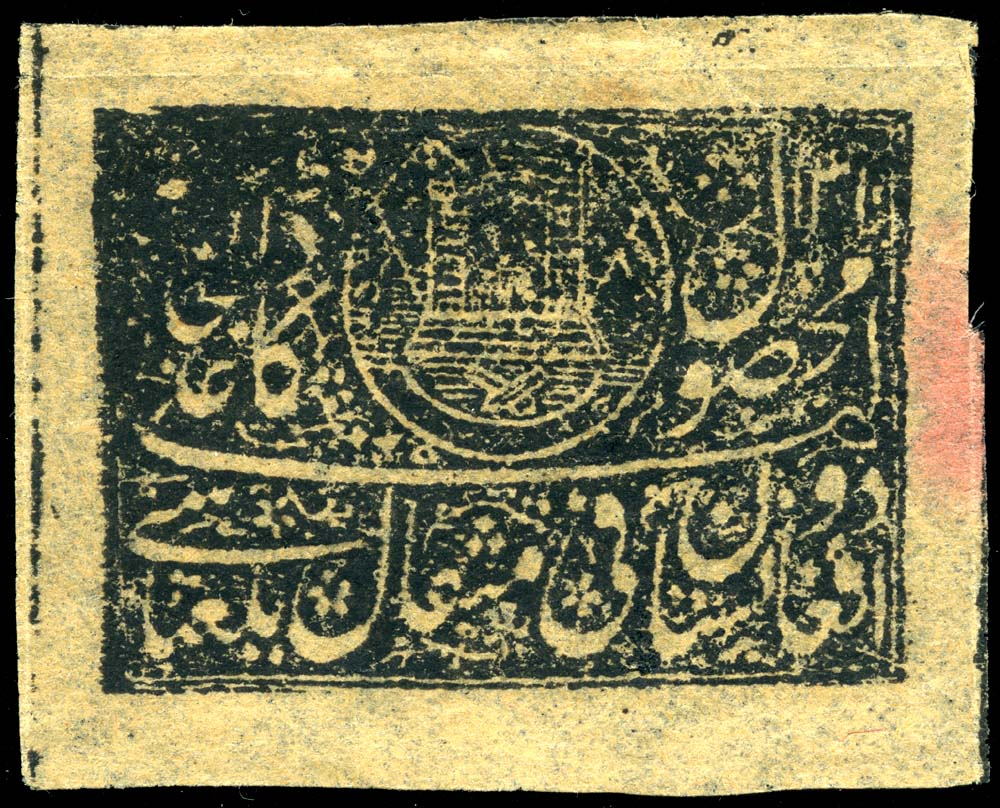
1-abasi stamp of 1892

The defeat of Sher Ali by the British brought Abdur Rahman Khan to the throne in 1880, and the following year brought new stamps, still round, but with inscriptions in the middle instead of the lion's head. The era of round designs ended in 1891 with rectangular issues for the "Kingdom of Afghanistan". The three designs consisted entirely Arabic script, and were printed in a slate blue color. The 1892 issue featured the national seal consisting of a mosque gate and crossed cannons; it was printed in black on colored paper; at least 10 colors of paper were used, and there are many shades as well, even though all the colors had the same value. In 1894 simplified versions of this design were printed on green paper. The 1898 issues of the national seal on a variety of colored paper were not regularly issued.

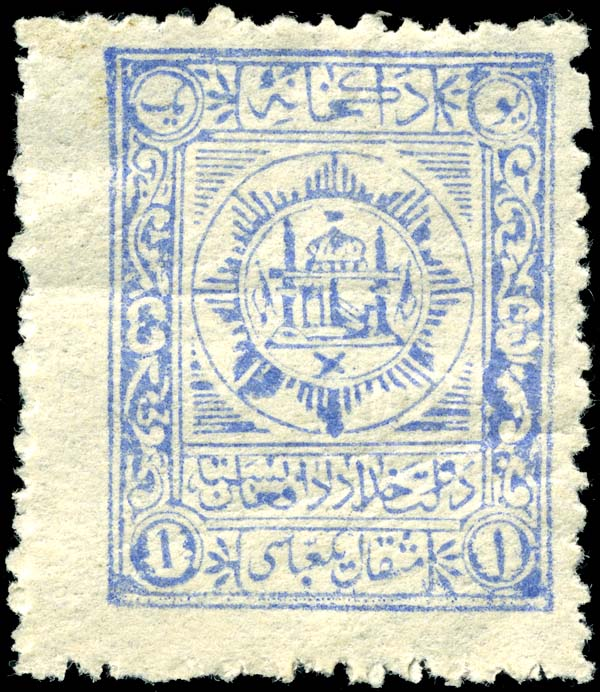
1 abasi, 1909

In 1907 the first rouletted stamps were issued, along with imperforate varieties, depicting a whole mosque, with various surrounding ornamentation. In the 1909 issue the mosque was displayed inside an eight-pointed star pattern.

== Independence ==
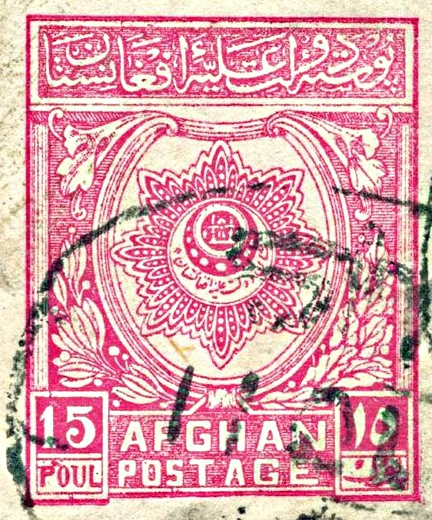
15-poul imperf stamp of 1927, first use of Roman letters

The first issue after independence came out on 24 August 1920, a design featuring the royal star of King Amanullah. The three denominations were also the first to use Latin script for the numerals as well as Arabic. Beginning in 1924, each year at least one stamp was issued in February to commemorate independence, a pattern that held steady, with few omissions, until the 1960s.

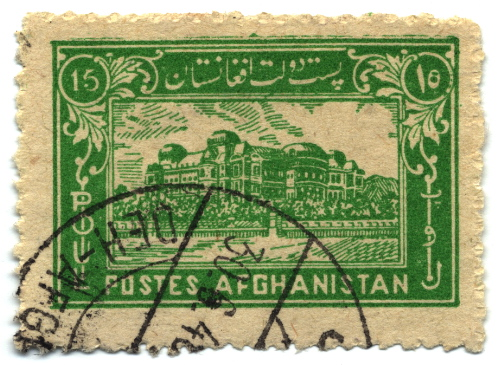
Parliament House on the 15p of 1939

Afghanistan joined the Universal Postal Union in 1928; previously international mail required stamps of British India. In 1927, the first Roman letters had appeared on an Afghan stamp, the inscription reading "AFGHAN POSTAGE". This changed to the French "POSTES AFGHANES" in 1928, and remained in that form (with some deviations, as in the 1939 issue) until 1989.

The Afghan stamps of the 1930s and 1940s are rather plain affairs, mostly typographed, with large blank spaces in the design. The definitive series of 1951 was finely engraved by Waterlow and Sons, several featuring portraits of Mohammed Zahir Shah.

A large number of Afghan stamps appeared in the 1960s. Since the Afghan Postal Authority issued some stamps well below the minimal amount of postage, this was considered to be a scheme for making money from stamp collectors. The issues from 1960 on are not especially notable. During this time, a number of politically aligned stamps were produced demonstrating support for Pashtunistan, a political issue that cut relations with Pakistan for several years that decade.

Starting in the mid-1980s, many of the issues were clearly produced to sell to Western stamp collectors; for instance, the ship series of 1986 is not especially relevant in a landlocked country.

== Civil war and after ==
The disruption of governance in the late 1980s and early 1990s due to civil war and the rise of the Islamic Emirate of Afghanistan, led to stopping of stamp issues from 1989 to 2001, although the postal service continued to exist it functioned only haphazardly using existing stamp supplies. There are only a few postal items known from the 1996 to 2001 period. During this interim period, many unofficial stamps were printed and distributed, which were disavowed by the Afghanistan postal service in 2000 under the Taliban, and subsequently in 2003 by the Karzai government.

Stamp production resumed when the Taliban regime was overthrown and the Afghan Postal Authority reconstituted. The first issue of a postage stamp after the hiatus was the May 2002 stamp showing Ahmad Shah Massoud, a military general and national hero who defended Afghanistan against the Soviet Union in the 1980s and later led a resistance movement against the Taliban.

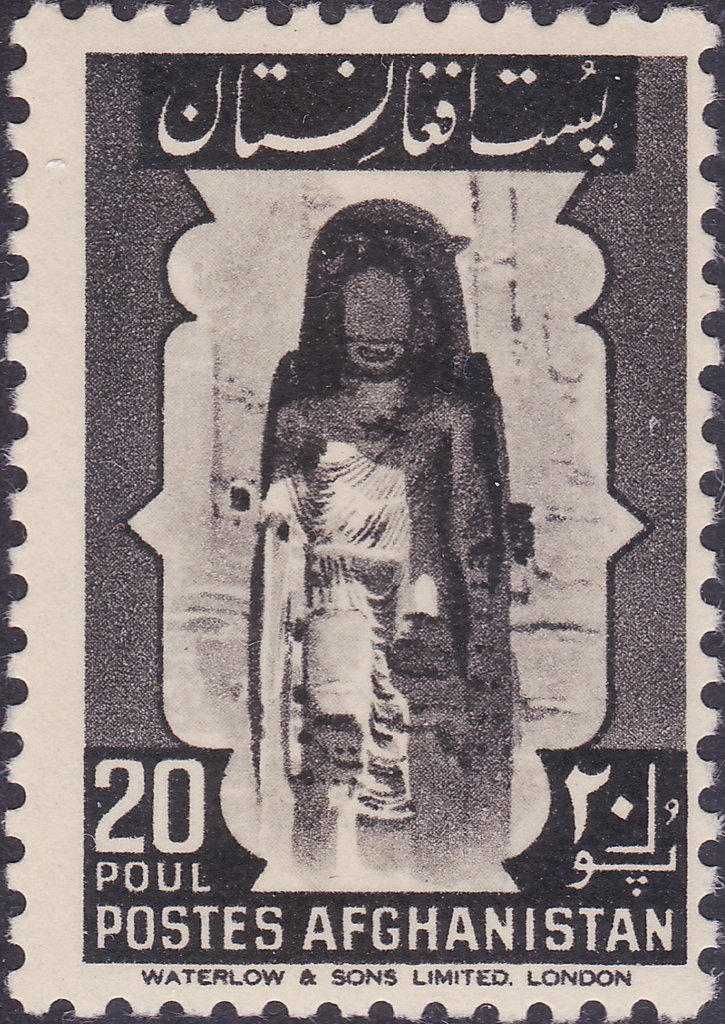
Bamiyan themed postage stamp (1951) issued by Postes Afghanes (Afghan Post)

During the Islamic Republic of Afghanistan period from 2004 to 2021, the postal service as Afghan Post managed to recreate a network of post offices and services although this sped up after 2017 as Ahmad Wahid Wais became the new company director. Until then the core activities remained the transport of mail and parcels. By early 2020s there were around 3000 postal points for the public to access those services: one or two post offices per province, one postal agent or agency at least per district. Wais extended the activities to freight and e-commerce.

Postage issues were irregular between 2001 and 2017, with only three stamps from 2008 to 2017. However the wish to issue more stamps was limited by local possibilities. President Ashraf Ghani wished governmental documents be printed in Afghanistan, but in 2017 Suhuk, the state printer, did not have machines usable for stamp printing and perforating. Former philatelic chief Walid Saviz testified to philatelist Peter Hornung that the Shafiq, Saffron of Afghanistan and President Mohammad Daoud Khan stamps presented at ceremonies in 2018 were printed in low quality and little numbers or on paper inadequate for stamps (on photographic paper for the 2018 Abu Rayhan al-Biruni stamp).

In 2019 quality increased thanks to printing in foreign printing plants. The stamp for the centenary of the independence of Afghanistan, picturing King Amanullah Khan, was printed in China and promoted by the Chinese embassy in Kabul. The 150th anniversary of Gandhi stamp and the Indo-Afghna Friendship stamp were made by the Indian state's Security Printing Press in Hyderabad, with the help of the Indian embassy in Kabul, but still in low numbers as the others (around 5000). The last stamp issued before the Taliban retook power was in January 2021 honoring Japanese humanitarian Tetsu Nakamura who was killed in Jalalabad in 2019. It was printed by Suhuk, offered to many visiting foreign dignitaries and in Japan. In 2021 the philatelic service was working on a website on the history of Afghan stamps and an online shop.

The Taliban took Kabul in August 2021. Talib Maulana Rahmatullah Maki was named president of Afghan Post. Until Autumn 2022 the company had prioritised postal operations. No stamps from the previous period were allowed to be sold. In Autumn 2022 the sales of these stamps were finally allowed to collectors, but they can not be used on mail.

The lack of available stamps (either their printed numbers or their prohibition since 2021) implies that mail in Afghanistan has not borne stamps since at least mid-2010s. Afghan Post employees sell blank envelopes and check the contents after the sender has prepared his correspondence; then the employee prints a bill for the postage. Sender has to pay this bill to a counter of the state bank Bank-e-Millie Afghan and had to come back with a bank receipt. Then his mail is accepted as paid in cash. The procedure is to avoid postal employees' corruption.

As of January 2023 Afghan Post deputy director Hamed Naseri was preparing stamp issues: on the new Qosh Tepa Canal, the departure of the last U.S. soldier, and on production of saffron. Possibly a reissue of the 2019 Gandhi stamp could happen. Problems were to find a printing plant abroad and to open a web shop whereas the Taliban's Islamic Emirate of Afghanistan is facing international sanctions, especially on financial transfers.

== See also ==
- Afghan Post
- Communications in Afghanistan
- Postal codes in Afghanistan
- Postal history

== References and sources ==
Notes and references

Sources

- Kloetzel, James E.; et al., eds. (2008). "Afghanistan". Scott 2009 Standard Postage Stamp Catalogue. Vol. 1 (165th ed.). Sidney, Ohio: Scott Publishing Co. p. 251. ISBN 978-0-89487-417-8.
- Stanley Gibbons Ltd: various catalogues
- Stuart Rossiter & John Flower: The Stamp Atlas
- F. E. Patterson III, Afghanistan: Its Twentieth Century Postal Issues The Collectors Club, 1964
- Cecil H. Uyehara and Horst G. Dietrich, "Afghan Philately 1871-1989" George Alevizos, Santa Monica, CA USA, 1995
- John M. Wilkins RFD, "Afghanistan 1840-2002 Postal History Handbook, Revised Edition", The Royal Philatelic Society of Victoria (Australia), 2002.
- Wilkins and Divall, "Afghanistan Revisted, Postal Stationery-Revenues-Forgeries", The Royal Philatelic Society of Victoria (Australia), 2005.
- Robert Jack, "The Revenue Stamps and Printed Paper of Afghanistan", Robert Jack, ISBN 978-0-9562630-0-1, 2009
- Peter Hornung, "La philatélie au pays des Talibans" (Philately in the land of Talibans), Timbres magazine, April 2023, p. 24-29. Sources are listed as interviews with former and current postal officers in 2022-2023, Afghan Post's Facebook page, and the author's personal experience in Kabul, January 2023.
  - Published in English: Peter Hornung, "Afghanistan: Philately in the Taliban era", Gibbons Stamp Monthly, July 2023, pages 46–51.
