= Afghan Post =

National mail and courier organization of Afghanistan

- Logo since 2021

Postal Administration overview
- Type: Government organization
- Headquarters: Ministry of Communications and IT, Mohammad Jan Khan Watt 1001 Kabul, Afghanistan
- Motto: Fast Safe Secure
- Postal Administration executive: Molaway Rahmatullah Maki, President
- Parent department: Ministry of Communications and Information Technology
- Website: https://afghanpost.gov.af/en

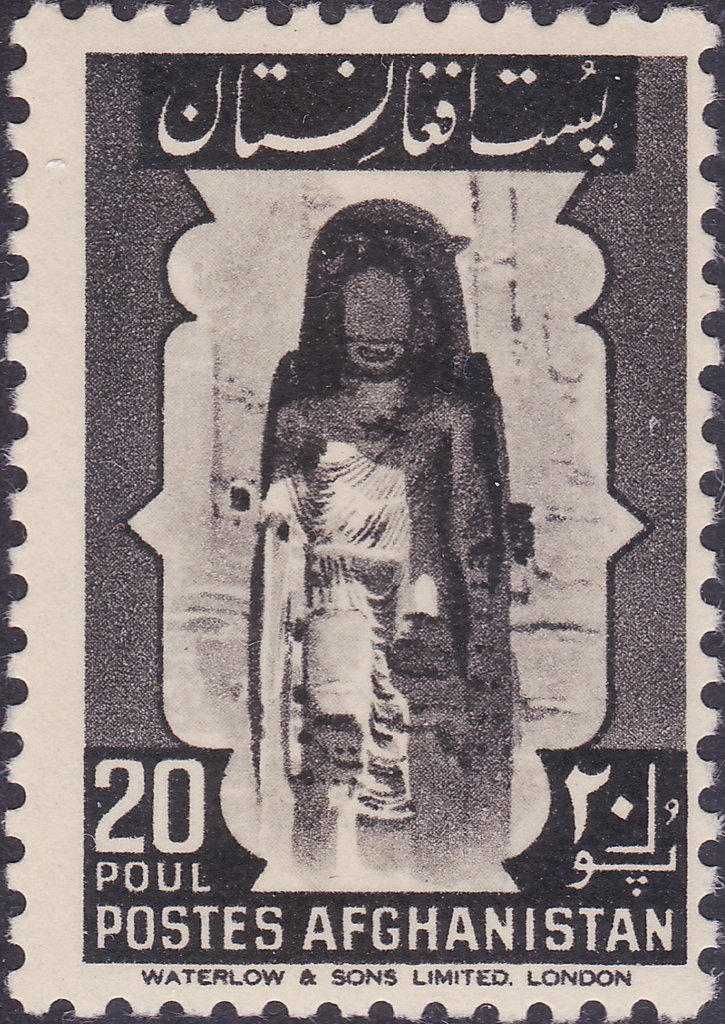
Bamiyan themed postage stamp (1951) issued by Postes Afghanes (Afghan Post)

Afghan Post is the national mail and courier organization of Afghanistan with its headquarters in Kabul. It has offices in all 34 provinces and 420 or so districts of Afghanistan.

Most homes in Afghanistan, particularly in older neighborhoods and in the rural areas, do not have street addresses. Names and other descriptions may be used in place of street addresses.

== History ==
Logo of Afghan Post (deprecated since 2021; note Republican colors)

The first postal arrangements in Afghanistan are credited to Sher Ali Khan, who established a postal service in the 1860s as part of a program to modernize the country. In the late 1970s, it had grown into one of the stronger regional postal services, able to send and receive letters from anywhere in the world.

=== Timeline ===
- 1870: Establishment of Balahisar Post office in Kabul and a post office in the center of each province of the country serving Primary Postal Services Affairs and Postal Stamps.
- 1892: A post office near Arg was established.
- 1908: Postal network developed more.
- 1918: General Directorship of Post and Telegraph & Telephone was included in the Organization of the Interior Ministry.
- 1918: A post office was established in each of the big cities.
- 1925: International post services began between Afghanistan and British India via Torkham.
- 1928: General Directorship of Post and Telegraph & Telephone becomes an Independent Administration.
- 1928: Afghanistan became of a member of the Universal Postal Union.
- 1928: After having joined the Universal Postal Union and some other individual company agreement were signed.
- 1929: Post is conveyed towards Torkham and Kandahar by vehicles.
- 1929: Various type of deliveries such as letters, postcards, newspapers, magazine and other printed materials as well as parcels are made inside and outside of the country.
- 1934: Title of the post administration from General Directorship of Telephone and Telegraph was changed into the Department of Telephone and Telegraph, and later on it was elevated to the Ministry of Communication.
- 1973: Law of postal services was amended.

During the 1990s, the Afghan postal service was suspended due to a civil war in the country. Sending a letter usually meant having to find someone traveling in the direction of the recipient willing to carry a note and hoping for the best. It gradually began to develop in the mid 2000s during the presidency of Hamid Karzai, especially on mail and parcel delivery. Under director Ahmad Wahid Wais from 2017 to 2021, Afghan Post expanded its activities on freight, e-commerce and providing data services to government agencies.

As of the early 2020s, there are around 3000 postal points for the public to access these services: one or two post offices per province and at least one postal agent or agency per district. Wais extended the activities to freight and e-commerce. Since the mid-2010s, mail from Afghanistan has generally not been posted with postage stamps.

== See also ==
- Postage stamps and postal history of Afghanistan
- Communications in Afghanistan
- Transport in Afghanistan
