= Afghansat 1 =

Communications satellite

- Names: Eutelsat W2M (2008–2012); Eutelsat 48B (2012); Eutelsat 28B (2012–2014); Afghansat 1 (2014–present)
- Mission type: Communication
- Operator: Afghanistan's Ministry of Communications and Information Technology (2014–present)
- COSPAR ID: 2008-065B
- SATCAT no.: 33460
- Mission duration: 15 years

Spacecraft properties
- Manufacturer: EADS Astrium; ISRO
- Launch mass: 3,460 kilograms (7,630 lb)

Start of mission
- Launch date: 20 December 2008
- Rocket: Ariane 5ECA
- Launch site: Kourou ELA-3
- Contractor: Arianespace

Orbital parameters
- Reference system: Geocentric
- Regime: Geostationary
- Longitude: 48° East

Afghansat 1 (Pashto: افغان سټ یو, Persian: افغان‌ست 1), formerly named Eutelsat W2M, Eutelsat 48B, Eutelsat 28B is a telecommunications satellite operated by Afghanistan's Ministry of Communications and Information Technology.

== History ==
Eutelsat W2M, as it was then named, was originally launched on 20 December 2008 aboard an Ariane 5ECA carrier rocket along with the Hot Bird 9 spacecraft. It was built by EADS Astrium, based on the I-3K satellite bus provided by the Indian Space Research Organisation. It was to have been placed in geosynchronous orbit at 16°E, from where it was to provide communications services to Europe, North Africa, and the Middle East, with 32 NATO J-band (IEEE K_{u} band) transponders.

The satellite has a mass of 3,460 kg, and a planned service life of 15 years. On 28 January 2009, Eutelsat announced that it would not accept delivery of the satellite due to what was described as a "major anomaly affecting the satellite's power subsystem".

Commenting on these decisions, Eutelsat Communications Chairman and CEO Giuliano Berretta said: "The situation affecting W2M is a serious disappointment for Eutelsat. However, for many years we have pursued a strategy based on securing and expanding our in-orbit resources in order to mitigate this type of risk. Our current investment programme consequently combines early renewal of operating satellites, together with securing the fleet through readily available back-up resources, and expansion of services with larger satellites. This policy puts us in a position to absorb the unavailability of W2M without impact on the continuity of service we provide our customers."

On the same day Eutelsat also confirmed that the unavailability of W2M does not impact on the Group's guidance for revenues in excess of 900 million euros for the 2008–2009 financial year since the W2M satellite programme is fully insured.

Although Eutelsat had originally declared that, due to the power system partial failure, W2M would not be integrated into Eutelsat's satellite fleet; after the in-orbit failure of Eutelsat W2 in January 2010, Eutelsat decided to redeploy W2M at 16°E to provide limited back-up services for the failed W2 satellite. The satellite was redeployed from 28.5° East where it has delivered 100% availability since August 2012. Its estimated end of operational use in stable orbit is 2020.

In January 2014 the Afghan Ministry of Communications and Information Technology signed an agreement with Eutelsat for the use of satellite resources to enhance deployment of Afghanistan's national broadcasting and telecommunications infrastructure as well as its international connectivity. Eutelsat 48D supports a wide range of services including broadcasting, mobile telephony backhaul and IP connectivity. Commenting on the agreement, Minister Amirzai Sangin said: "Afghansat 1 is a new milestone in the development of the ICT sector in Afghanistan, which in the last 12 years has already seen mobile telephony coverage of 88% and penetration grow from zero to 75% through the licensing of six operators, ICT sector employment provided for more than 138,000 people and more than $2.1 billion invested in the national economy." Afghansat 1 was officially launched on 10 May 2014, with expected service for at least seven years in Afghanistan. The Afghan government then plans to launch Afghansat 2 after seven years later.
