= Amirzai Sangin =

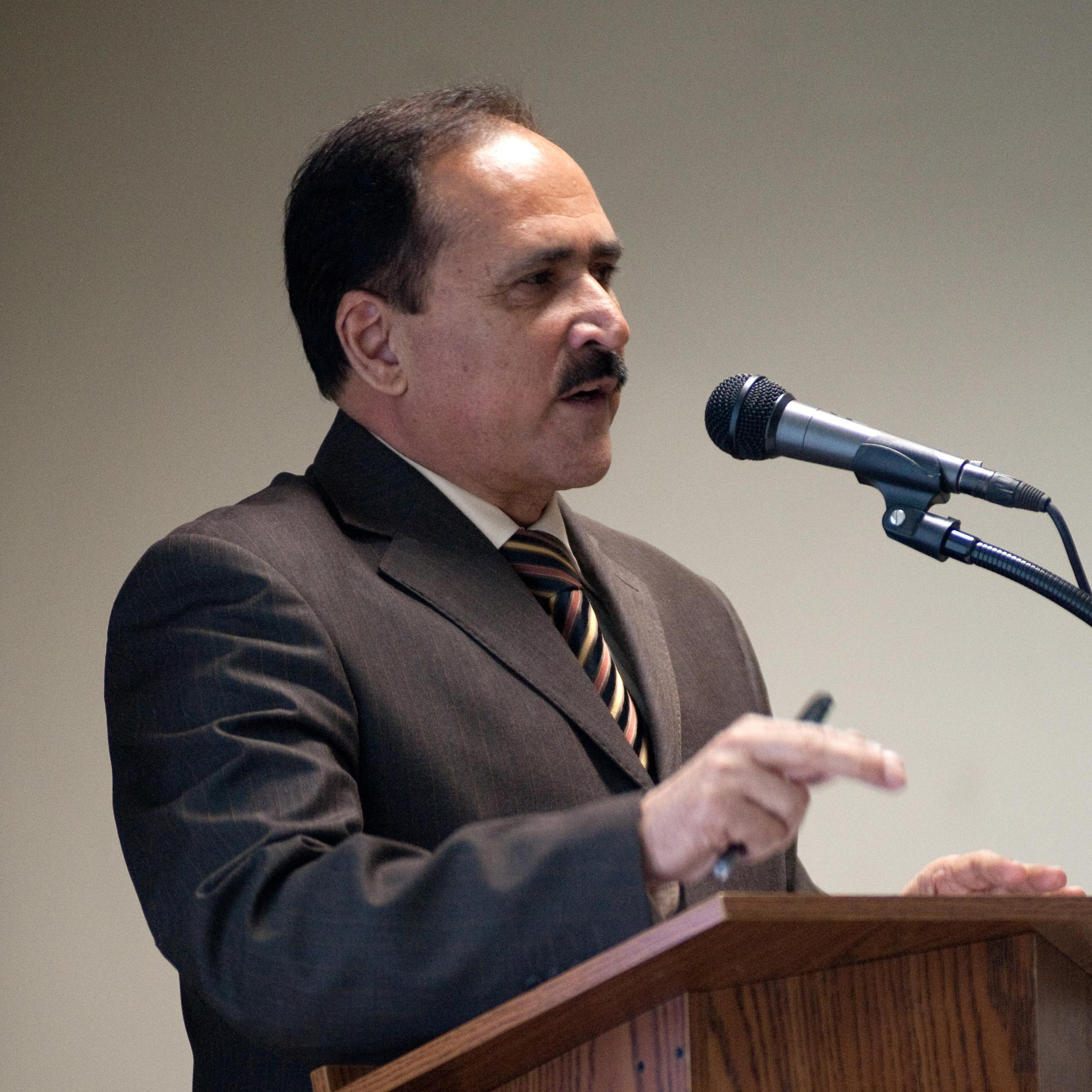
- Amirzai Sangin in 2011

Minister of Communications & IT of Afghanistan
- In office 2004 – January 2010
- President: Hamid Karzai

Personal details
- Born: 6 June 1949 (age 76) Paktika Province, Kingdom of Afghanistan

Amirzai Sangeen Sangin (Pashto: اميرزی سنگين, born 6 June 1949) is a politician in Afghanistan, he was the Minister of Communications & Information Technology. An ethnic Pashtun, he was born in the Urgun District of Paktika Province in Afghanistan.

As a founding member of the Swedish Committee for Afghanistan, he has made significant contributions to Afghanistan's education, agriculture and medical sectors over the last two and a half decades.

== Early life and education ==
Sangin was born as the first son to Amirgul Gulshakhel, a tailor, on 6 June 1949 in the Urgun District of Paktika Province. He has three brothers and eight sisters. Sangin attended primary school in Urgun and secondary school in Gardez, Paktia Province. He graduated from Afghanistan's Telecommunications Training Center (TTC), and arrived in London in 1969, where he studied for six years, obtaining an engineering degree in electronics and communications from South London College, London.

Sangin speaks Dari, Pashto, English and Swedish.

== Career ==
He was an instructor at TTC from 1975 to 1978, and served as its rector from 1978 to 1980.

After the Soviet invasion of Afghanistan, Sangin soon realized that he, as the rector of TTC, would be seen as a representative of the previous regime, and that he thus would be viewed as a traitor. This meant that he and his family were in danger. In March 1980, he by chance received an invitation to a telecom conference in Kalmar, Sweden. Upon arriving in Sweden in June, he sought asylum. His wife and their three sons would arrive a couple of months later. A daughter was born in Malmö, Sweden, in 1985, and the family has lived in the region since.

In 1982, Sangin joined Swedish Telecom. He worked for King Khaled International Airport in Saudi Arabia as a communications project team member from 1982 to 1985 and then, for the next five years, was involved in the design, development and implementation of mobile networks in Sweden. A founding member of Swedish Telecom International (now called Telia International), Sangin was a leader in obtaining international bids, winning 8 GSM licenses in Estonia, Latvia, Russia, Hungary, Italy, Namibia and India from 1990 to 2000. He has held several senior-level management positions in the establishment of highly successful companies.

Returning to Afghanistan soon after 9/11, Sangin initially carried out training for AWCC and MCIT engineers. He headed the Ministry of Communications & Information Technology (MCIT)' evaluation committee for a GSM license in 2002, and in February 2003, became Senior Advisor to the Minister of Communications & IT.

Sangin was appointed Chief Executive Officer (CEO) of Afghan Telecom in July 2004. As CEO, he worked to build the Afghan Telecom organization by developing new processes and procedures and improving issues of interconnection. He left this position to become Minister of Communications & IT of I.R of Afghanistan in 2004 and has been in this post for the last 8 years. During this period, under the visionary leadership of Mr. Sangin, there has been tremendous progress in the Telecommunication sector. The telecom sector has attracted the biggest Foreign Direct Investment totaling to $ 2 billion and annual revenues to the treasury are over $200 million. The telecom sector has created over 100,000 well-paid jobs. Telecom services cover over 85% of the population and there are over 18 million phone users in the country. Broadband digital networks, DSL, 3G and Wimax are being implemented in major cities and should reach more than 50% of population by end of 2014. Most parts of the country as well as neighboring countries are connected via optical fibre networks. As a result of this progress, the telecom sector today plays vital role in the lives of the Afghan people and in the economic development of Afghanistan.

Preceded by	Minister of Communications of Afghanistan; 2009–present	Succeeded by
