= Sayed Sadaat =

Afghan politician

Syed Ahmad Shah Sadaat is a former Afghan politician. He was a communications minister in the Afghan government. After serving the government for 2 years, Sadaat left office in 2018 and moved to Germany in September or December 2020 and works as a Lieferando delivery man in Leipzig. He has degrees in IT and telecommunications. However as of August 2021 he had not yet been able to find a job in related fields as he was still learning German. His situation aroused interest when the Afghan capital Kabul fell to the Taliban that month; many of his relatives also fled the country. Sadaat is a British citizen and now he works in the telecom and IT sector in Germany.
