= 2025 Afghanistan Internet delay =

Nationwide shutdown of internet

The 2025 Afghanistan Internet delay, also known as the Dzand Phase, (Note: This time period is also known as the 'Dzand Phase' among Pashto speakers in Afghanistan, especially among high-ranking Afghan officials and influential Afghan clerics.) (Pashto: ځنډ, romanized: Źanḍ, lit. 'Delay') was a time period when the Afghan government had gradually ordered a nationwide shutdown of fibre optic internet in steps, which was later followed by a complete shutdown of the Internet. This delay had lasted for 2 weeks, from 15 September 2025 to 1 October 2025, and posed significant challenges for the citizens of Afghanistan.

== Background ==
Afghanistan’s supreme leader Hibatullah Akhundzada issued a ban on fibre-optic network and WiFi services in Afghanistan to ‘prevent immorality’ in Balkh Province, which had taken place on 16 September 2025.

Other provinces like Kandahar, Uruzgan Province, Zabul Province, and Nimruz Province had been later affected, although Afghan officials had intended to impose the ban nationwide. On 16 September, Director of Information Sediqullah Quraishi confirmed that internet connection was cut in Nangarhar. As stated by Afghan officials, internet access on cell phone data would still be available, although deemed unreliable and costly. 2 days later, on 18 September 2025, the Afghan government had ordered a ban on fibre optic internet in Baghlan, Badakhshan, Kunduz, Nangarhar, and Takhar Provinces.

This was followed up with a nationwide shutdown until further notice ordered by Hibatullah on 29 September, who said the internet was unnecessary and had been banned by Mullah Omar with good reasoning. However, the ban was reversed on October 1, without any explanation. According to BBC, cabinet ministers including Abdul Ghani Baradar, Sirajuddin Haqqani and Mullah Yaqoob gathered at the prime minister's office and managed to convince Prime Minister Hasan Akhund to turn the internet back on, leading Akhundzada to back down.

== Impact ==
The ban on the Internet, as imposed by the Afghan government had led to many dire consequences, such as grounded flights due to many restrictions, as well as nationwide blackouts and unemployment, driven from a decreasing activity in businesses.
