= Safi Airways =

Airline in Afghanistan (2006–2016)

Coordinates: 50.9375°N 6.9697°E

| IATA | ICAO | Call sign |
|---|---|---|
| 4Q | SFW | SAFI |
- Founded: 2006
- Ceased operations: 5 September 2016
- Operating bases: Hamid Karzai International Airport
- Secondary hubs: Ahmad Shah Baba International Airport
- Frequent-flyer program: Saffron Rewards
- Fleet size: 34
- Destinations: 18
- Parent company: Safi Airways Ltd
- Headquarters: Kabul, Afghanistan
- Key people: Ghulam Hazrat Safi (Chairman); Zaidan Khalifat (Deputy CEO); Joshua G. Bustos (CCO)
- Website: www.safiairways.com

Safi Airways Co. (Pashto: صافي هوايي شرکت; Persian: خطوط هوایی صافی) was the first and largest privately owned airline in Afghanistan. The airline had its headquarters in Shahr-e-Naw, Kabul, Afghanistan, and an administrative office in the Dubai Airport Free Zone. The Afghan authorities ordered suspension of its operations in September 2016, after the airline failed to clear outstanding debt and taxes.

== History ==
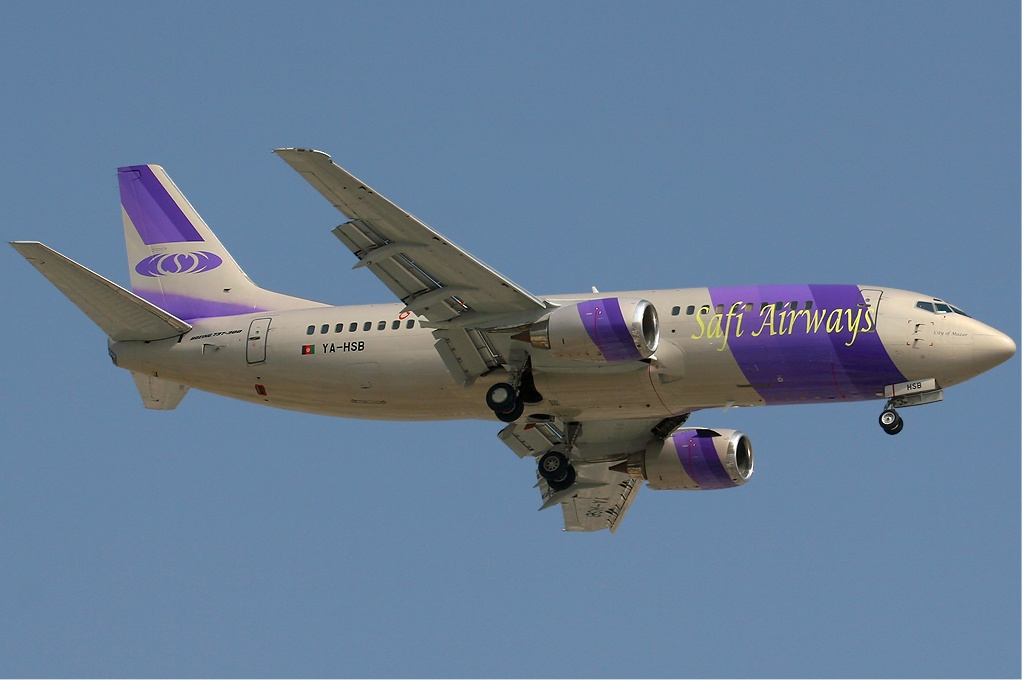
A former Safi Airways Boeing 737-300 (2009)

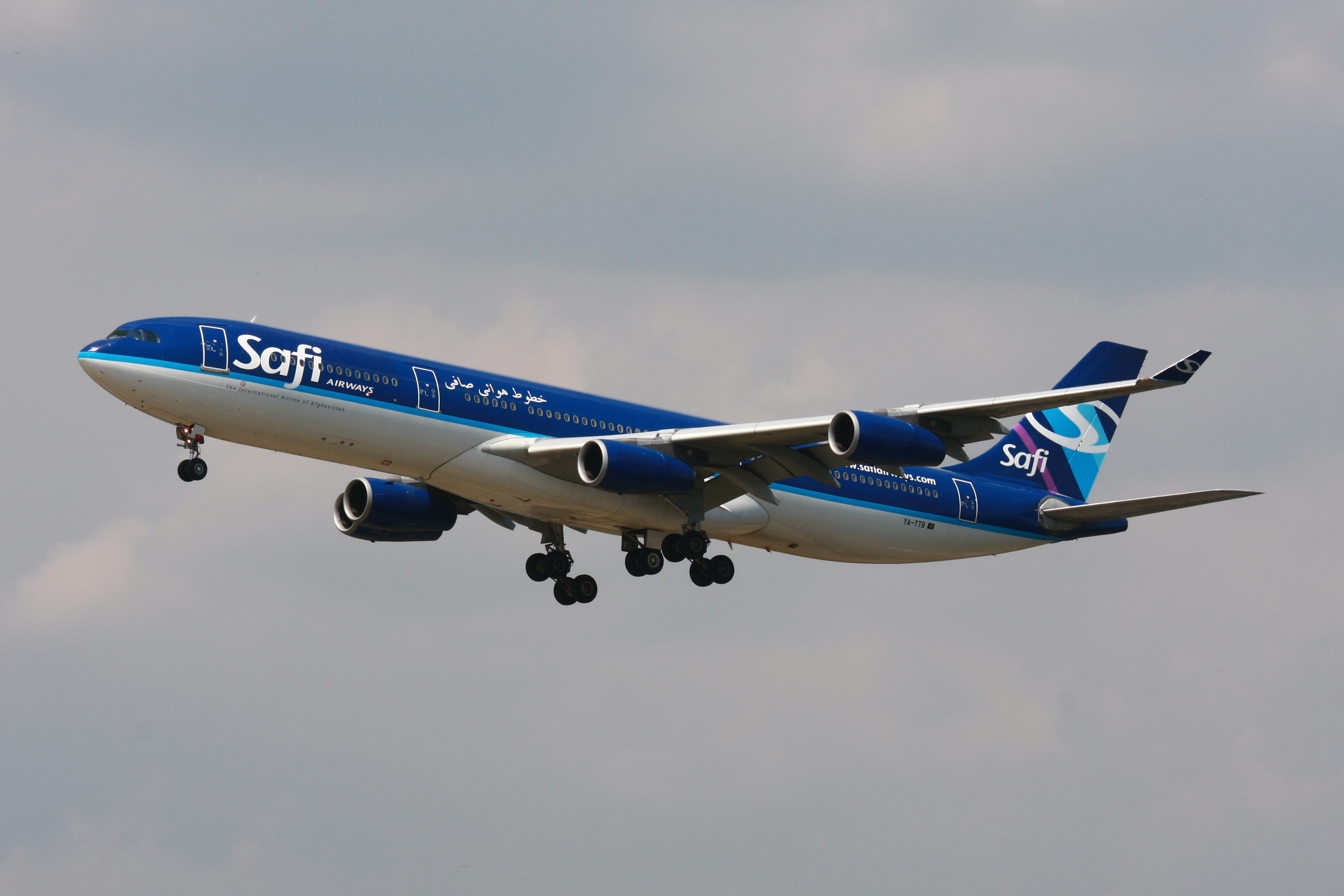
Former Safi Airways Airbus A340-300 still wearing the livery of previous operator Air Comet (2010)

Safi Airways has been founded as a subsidiary of the Safi Group and in 2006 by its chairman and CEO, Ghulam Hazrat Safi. On 15 June 2009, Safi Airways commenced operations between the Afghan capital, Kabul, and Frankfurt Airport, Germany. This service was however suspended on 24 November 2010 due to an EU ban barring all Afghan carriers from flying into Europe and did since never resume.

On 5 November 2009, Safi Airways took delivery of a pre-owned Airbus A340-300, which was phased out after suspension of the Frankfurt route due to the EU ban. In 2011, Safi Airways replaced their Boeing 737-300 aircraft with Airbus A32x aircraft. They intended to acquire an Airbus A330 for long haul routes in 2016 which however did not take place.

Since February 2012, Safi Airways is the first Afghan airline to operate in compliance with European Aviation Safety Agency (EASA) requirements, IOSA (IATA Operational Safety Audit) and ICAO (International Civil Aviation Organization).

On 5 September 2016, Afghan authorities forced Safi Airways to suspend all operations over unpaid debt and taxes.

== Destinations ==
As of September 2018, Safi Airways served the following destinations:

| Country | City | Airport | Notes | Ref |
|---|---|---|---|---|
| Afghanistan | Bagram | Bagram Airfield | Terminated | |
| Afghanistan | Herat | Herat International Airport | suspended | |
| Afghanistan | Kabul | Hamid Karzai International Airport | Hub | |
| Afghanistan | Balkh | Maulana Jalaluddin Balkhi International Airport | suspended | |
| Afghanistan | Kandahar | Kandahar International Airport | suspended | |
| Bahrain | Manama | Bahrain International Airport | | |
| Canada | Toronto | Toronto Pearson International Airport | | |
| Germany | Frankfurt | Frankfurt Airport | | |
| Germany | Cologne/Bonn | Cologne Bonn Airport | | |
| Germany | Hamburg | Hamburg International Airport | | |
| India | Delhi | Indira Gandhi International Airport | suspended | |
| India | Hyderabad | Rajiv Gandhi International Airport | | |
| Iran | Tehran | Mehrabad International Airport | | |
| Iran | Mashhad | Mashhad International Airport | suspended | |
| Kuwait | Kuwait City | Kuwait International Airport | | |
| Pakistan | Islamabad | Islamabad International Airport | suspended | |
| Pakistan | Karachi | Karachi International Airport | | |
| Saudi Arabia | Jeddah | King Abdulaziz International Airport | suspended | |
| United Arab Emirates | Abu Dhabi | Abu Dhabi International Airport | Terminated | |
| United Arab Emirates | Dubai | Dubai International Airport | suspended | |
| United Arab Emirates | Sharjah | Sharjah International Airport | | |

== Fleet ==
=== Final fleet ===
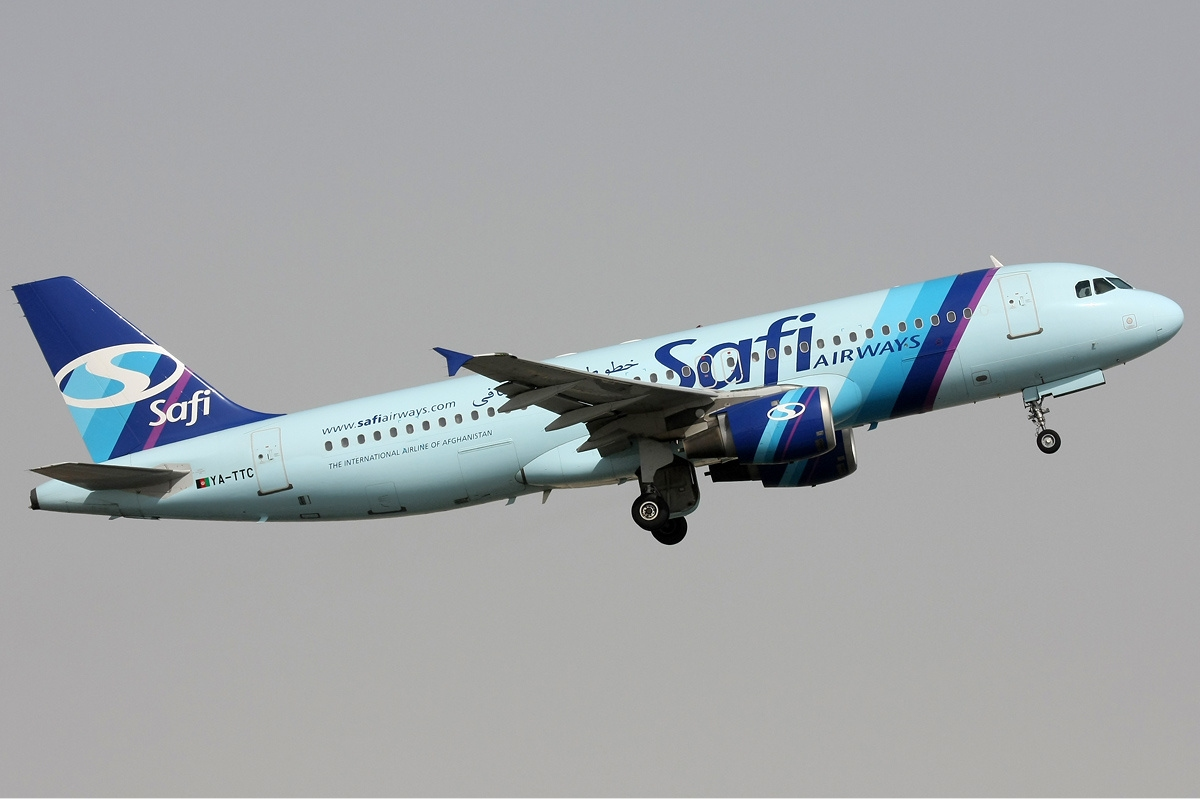
Safi Airways Airbus A320-200

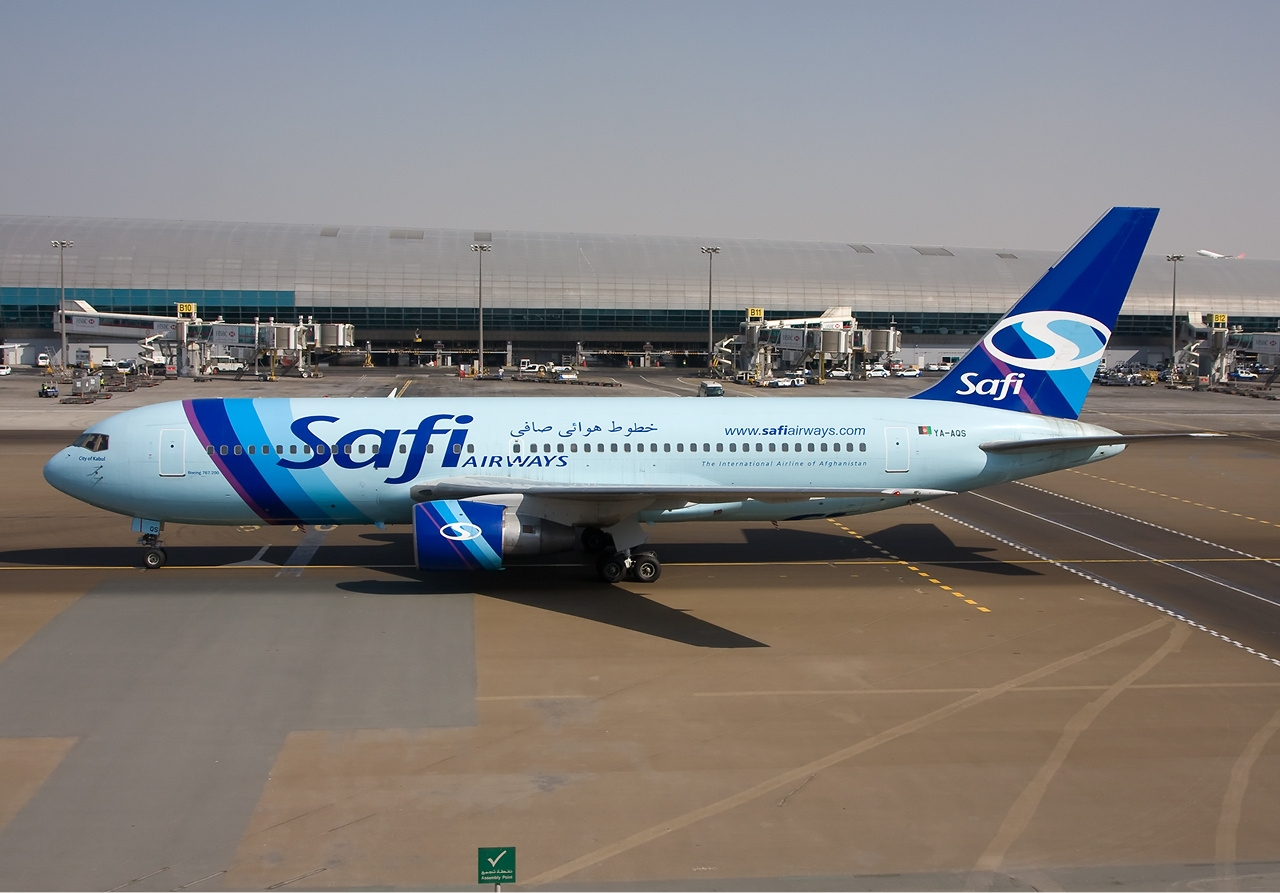
Safi Airways Boeing 767-200ER

As of October 2016, the Safi Airways fleet consisted of the following aircraft:

Safi Airways Fleet
| Aircraft | In Fleet | Orders | Passengers | | | Notes |
| Aircraft | In Fleet | Orders | J | Y | Total | Notes |
|---|---|---|---|---|---|---|
| Airbus A320-200 | 8 | — | 12 | 132 | 144 | |
| Boeing 767-200ER | 7 | — | 12 | 196 | 208 | stored |
| Total | 15 | 0 | | | | |

=== Former fleet ===
Safi Airways previously operated the following aircraft:

| Aircraft | Introduced | Retired | Notes |
|---|---|---|---|
| Airbus A319-100 | 2013 | 2017 | |
| Airbus A340-300 | 2009 | 2015 | |
| Boeing 737-300 | 2008 | 2017 | |
| Boeing 737-400 | 2016 | 2018 | |
| Boeing 757-200 | 2012 | 2018 | |
| Airbus A330-200 | 2017 | 2018 | |
| Airbus A340-600 | 2017 | 2018 | |
| Boeing 777-300 | 2017 | 2018 | |
| McDonnell Douglas MD-87 | 2017 | 2017 | Leased from Gryphon Airlines |
