= Kandahar University =

Public university in Kandahar, Afghanistan

Coordinates: 31.63815°N 65.69693°E

- کندهار پوهنتون / پوهنتون قندهار
- Type: Public
- Established: 1990
- Chancellor: Sheikh Mawlawi Abdul Rahman Tayeb
- Students: 9,000
- Location: Kandahar, Kandahar Province, Afghanistan
- Website: kdru.edu.af

Kandahar University (Note: Pashto: کندهار پوهنتون Dari: پوهنتون قندهار) (KDRU) is a major public university in Kandahar, Afghanistan. It was established during the Presidency of Mohammad Najibullah in 1990. Its current chancellor is Sheikh Mawlawi Abdul Rahman Tayeb.

In the last decades, the Ministry of Higher Education has been expanded the university with many new buildings and facilities being added. It has a large library and a multipurpose sports ground. A 25 million afghanis development work on the university's campus is still ongoing, which includes adding roads and sidewalks, and improving the overall landscape. In 2025 Hibatullah Akhundzada made a visit to the university, where he addressed students and staff.

== Chancellors ==
Toryalai Wesa, an Afghan-Canadian who returned from Canada to Afghanistan and served as the governor of Kandahar Province from 2008 to 2014, became the chancellor of Kandahar University. He was replaced by Hazrat Mir Totakhail. after the Islamic Emirate of Afghanistan returned to power Dr. Abdul Wahid Waseeq was made the chancellor. He was placed by Mohammad Ikram Shah Asim.

== Faculties ==
The following faculties are available at KDRU:

1. Computer science
2. Economics
3. Education
4. Engineering
5. Journalism and public relations
6. Language and literature
7. Law and political science
8. Master of public health
9. Medical
10. Pharmacy
11. Public administration and policy
12. Sharia Law

== Allama Habibi Library ==
The Allama Habibi Library, which is named in honor of Abdul Hai Habibi, has a large collection of books. It is equipped with Koha (software).

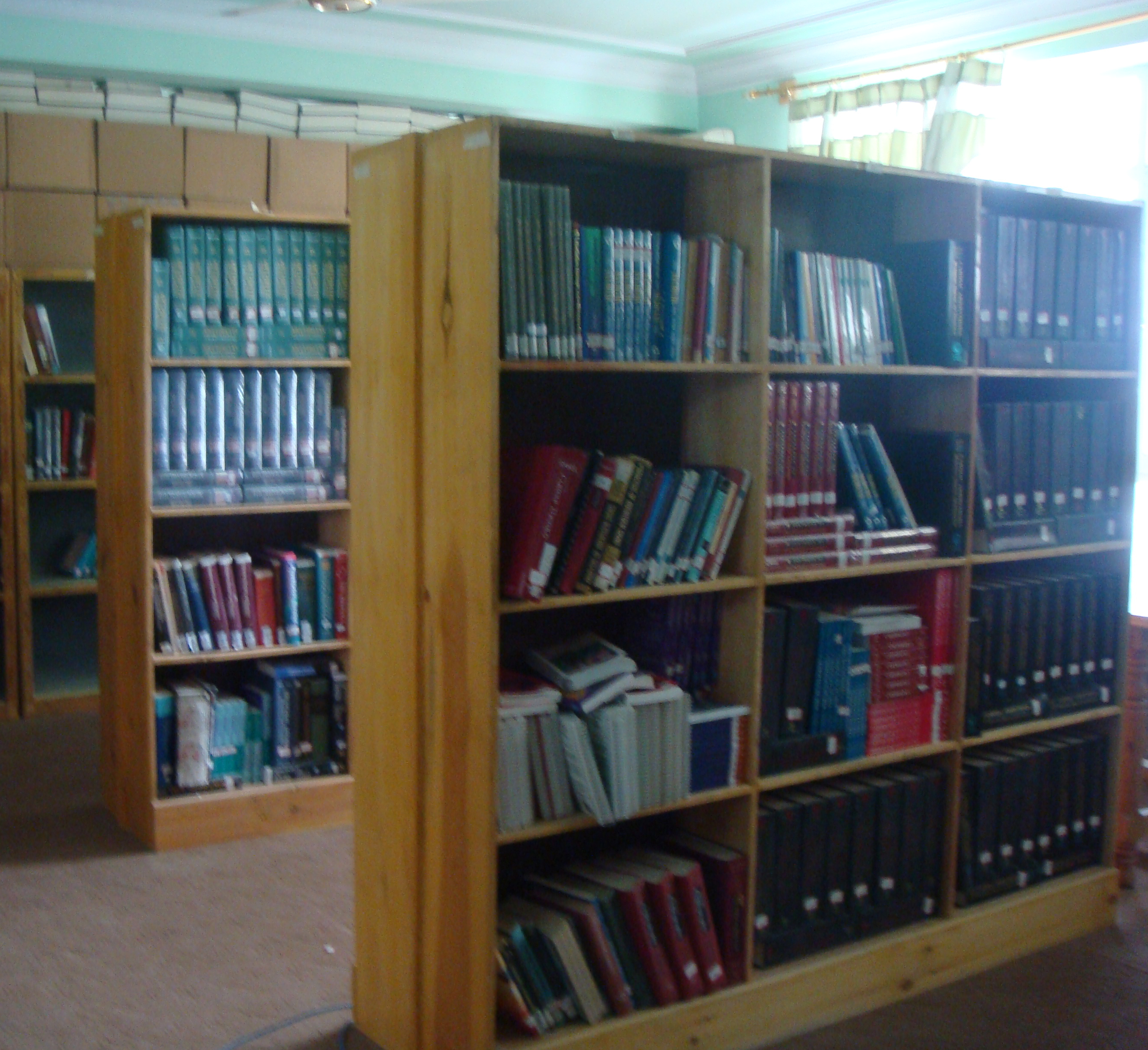
Inside the Allama Habibi Library

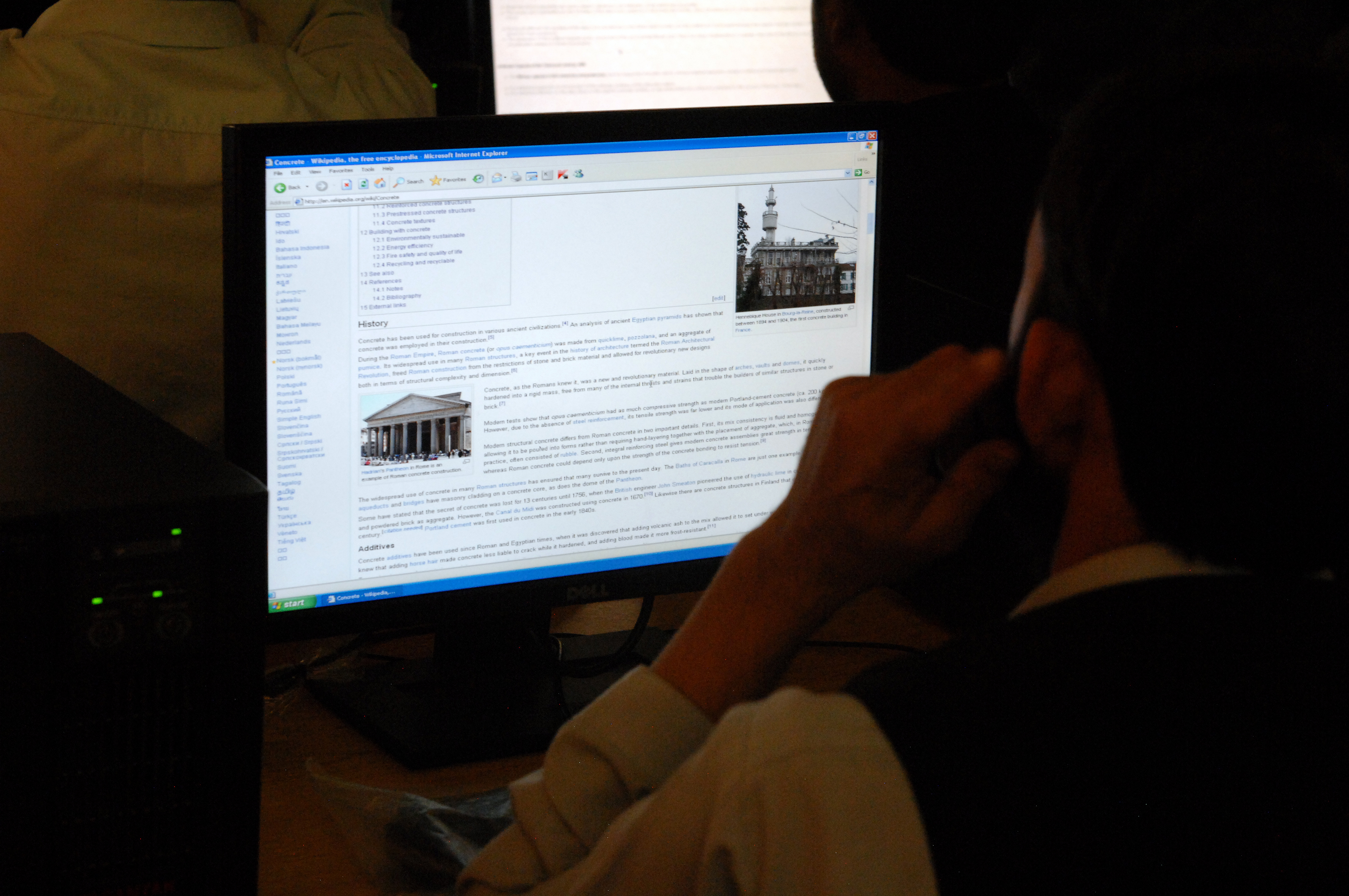
Student using the Internet in 2010

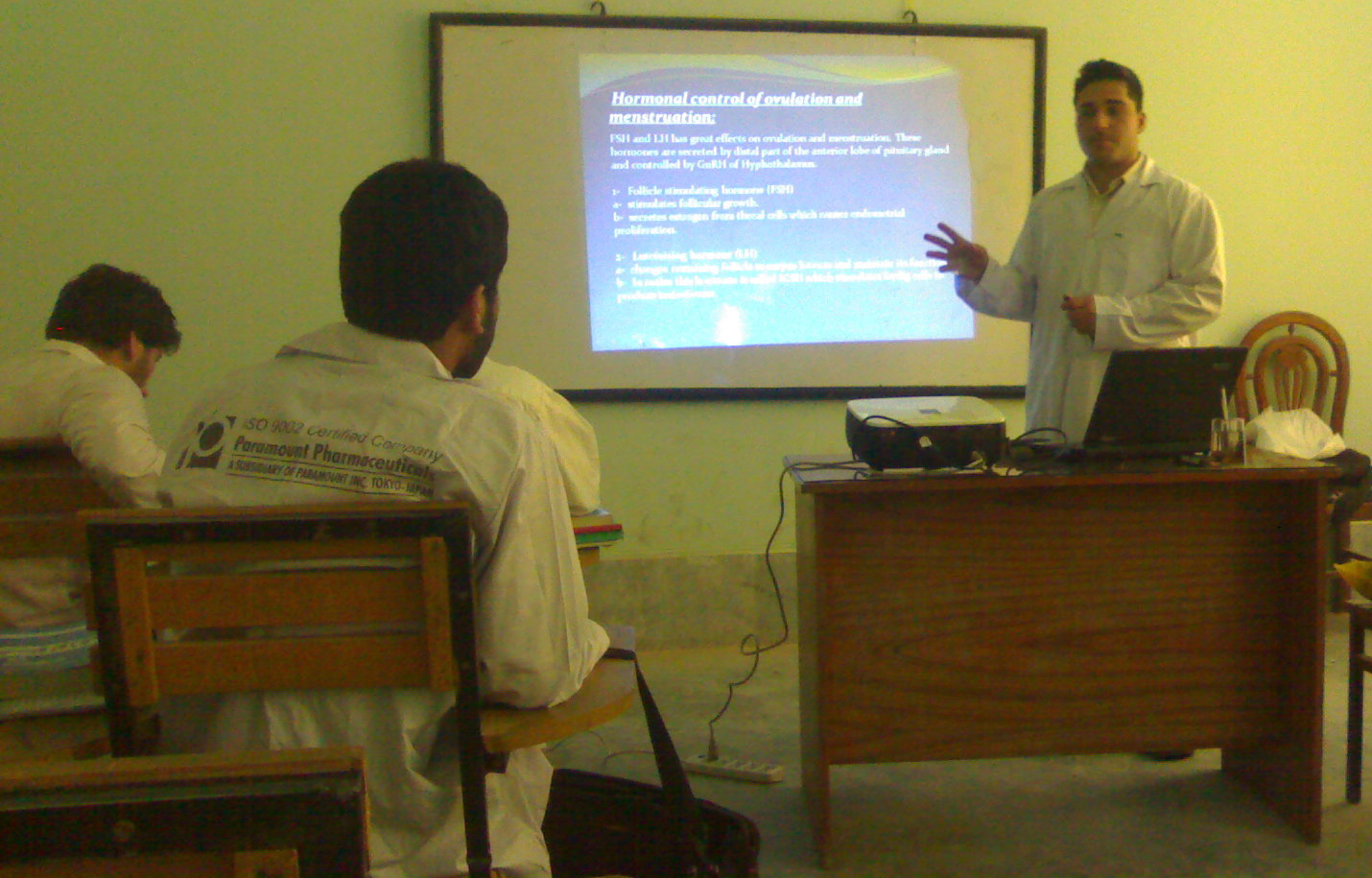
A first year medical student gives his lecture

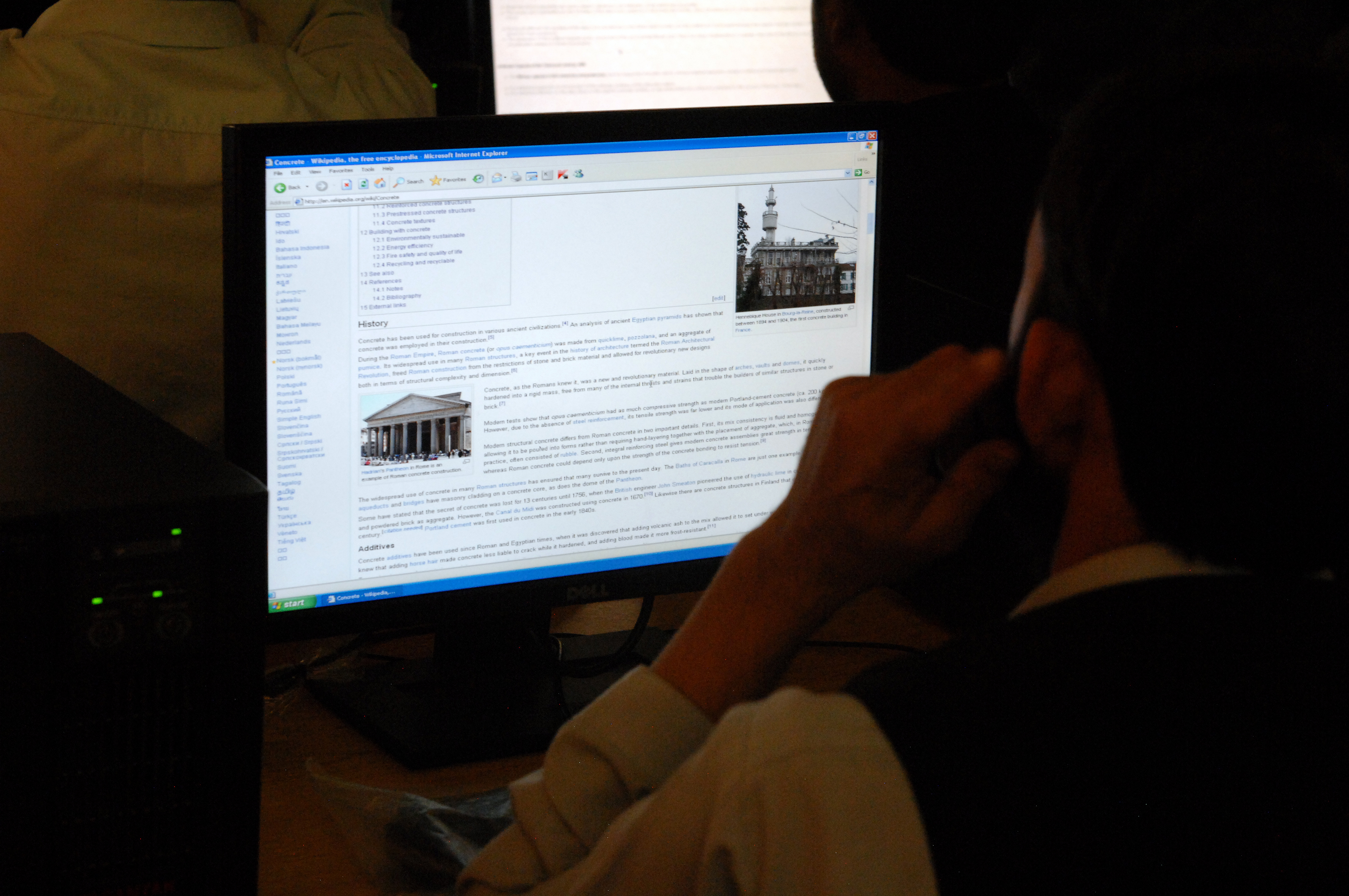
Student viewing Wikipedia pages at the IT room in Kandahar University

Dean of Agriculture faculty (left) receives books of Soil Science in 2009

The hostel area in 2009

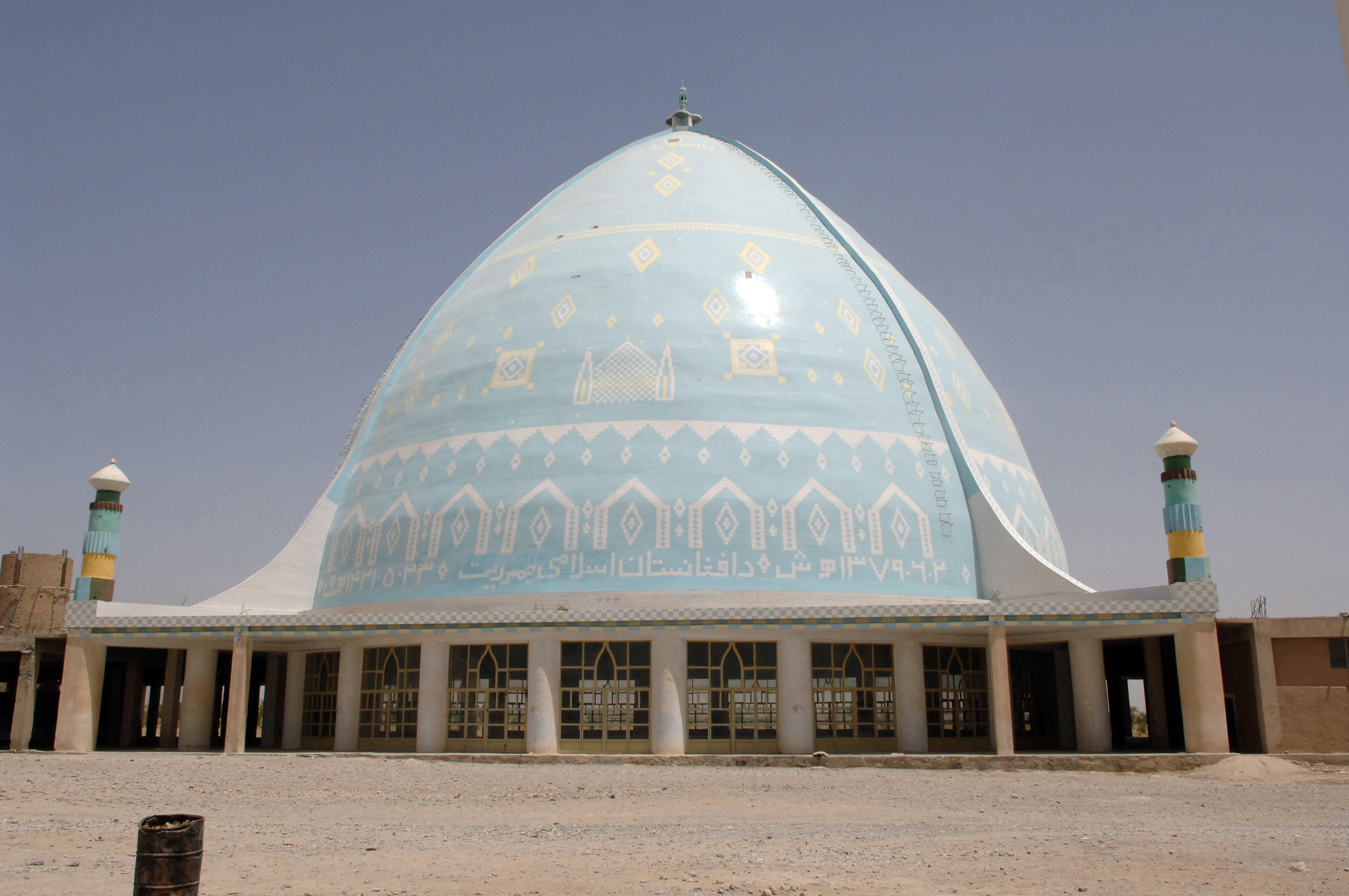
The mosque that was originally built under Mullah Omar in the late 1990s

== Notable alumni ==
Notable graduates and former faculty of Kandahar University include:

- Nemat Rawan, former anchor at TOLOnews and a media official at the Ministry of Finance

== See also ==
- List of universities in Afghanistan
- Ministry of Higher Education (Afghanistan)
