= AZ Corporation =

AZ Corporation is a construction firm in Afghanistan. AZ Corporation received construction and transport contracts with NATO and the United States Department of Defense.

On August 25, 2008, one man described as the owners of AZ Corporation, Tahir Ramin, joint citizen of Afghanistan and the United States was tricked into traveling to the United States with five other Afghan men connected with construction contracts at the Bagram Air Base. The man was detained on charges he had bribed GIs to secure contracts at the base.

Publicly filed figures state AZ Corporation received its first contracts with the DoD, worth $14,566,865, in 2007 and 2008. The GIs the Ramin is accused of bribing served in Afghanistan in 2004 and 2005.
