= Tenor (website) =

Search engine

Tenor, Inc.

- Screenshot
- Former name: Riffsy (2014-2016)
- Website type: Search engine GIF hosting website
- Headquarters: San Francisco, California, United States
- No. of locations: 3
- Area served: Worldwide
- Owner: Google
- Founders: David Macintosh; Erick Hachenburg; Frank Nawabi
- CEO: David McIntosh
- Products: GIF Keyboard
- Website: tenor.com
- Registration: Optional
- Users: 300+ Million (Monthly)
- Launched: February 1, 2014; 12 years ago
- Current status: Website live; API decommissioned on June 30, 2026

Tenor, Inc. is an online GIF search engine and database owned by Google. Its main product is the GIF Keyboard, which is available on Android, iOS, and macOS.

== History ==
The company was founded by entrepreneurs David Macintosh, Erick Hachenburg, and Frank Nawabi on February 1, 2014 as Riffsy.

Tenor was funded by Redpoint Ventures, Menlo Ventures, Cowboy Ventures, OCA Ventures, and Tenaya Capital.

In 2016, Riffsy was rebranded to Tenor, reflecting its broader ambition to become the emotional search engine of the internet.

It also launched an SDK to help developers integrate GIFs into apps and games.

On March 27, 2018, Tenor was acquired by Google. The company has continued to operate as a standalone brand.

On January 13, 2026, it was announced that the Tenor API would be decommissioned on June 30, 2026.

== Partnerships ==
Tenor is available in numerous keyboards and messaging apps.

On April 25, 2017, Tenor introduced an app that makes GIFs available in the MacBook Pro's Touch Bar. Users can scroll through GIFs and tap to copy it to the clipboard.

On September 7, 2017, Tenor announced an SDK for Unity and Apple's ARKit. It allows developers to integrate GIFs into augmented reality apps and games.

== Censorship ==
On November 6, 2017, in response to users having utilized Tenor and similar services to distribute GIFs with content that is illegal under local laws, the Indonesian Ministry of Communication and Informatics threatened to block WhatsApp. The regulator acknowledged that despite being from third-party providers, WhatsApp was wholly responsible for allowing the content to be disseminated to users because the feature was part of their platform. The next day, Tenor was blocked in the country. The threats were later dropped.
