= .af =

Top-level Internet domain for Afghanistan

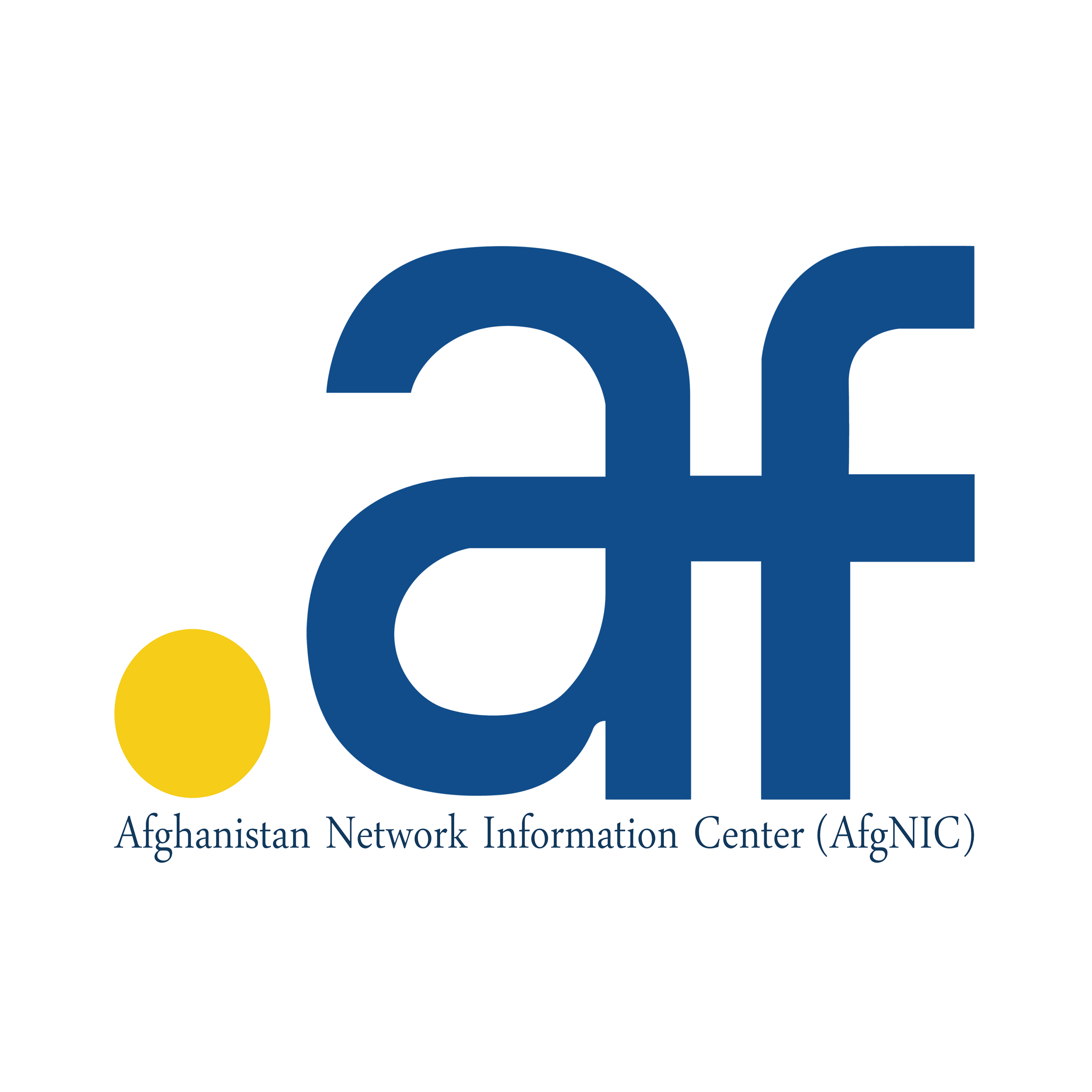
- Introduced: 16 October 1997
- TLD type: Country code top-level domain
- Status: Active
- Registry: AFGNIC
- Sponsor: Ministry of Communications and Information Technology
- Intended use: Entities connected with Afghanistan
- Actual use: Some use in Afghanistan
- Registered domains: 5960 (26 August 2020)
- Registration restrictions: Third-level names have restrictions based on which second-level name they are beneath.
- Structure: Registrations are taken directly at the second level or at the third level beneath various second-level subdomains
- Documents: ICANN MoU; Policies
- Dispute policies: Policies
- Registry website: nic.af

.af is the Internet country code top-level domain (ccTLD) for Afghanistan. It is administered by AFGNIC, a service of the UNDP.

== History ==
The .af domain was delegated to Abdul Razeeq in 1997, a year after Taliban fighters had captured Kabul and founded the Islamic Emirate of Afghanistan.

NetNames of London initially maintained the domain following an agreement with the IANA. Razeeq later disappeared, halting some services.

The domain was reopened on 10 March 2003, as a joint program between UNDP and the Afghan Ministry of Communications.

As of 26 August 2020, .af was used by 5,960 domains.

With the fall of Kabul in 2021, the .af domain again came under the control of the Taliban. ICANN said it "defers decision making to within the country".

== Registration ==
Registration is made directly at the second level, or on the third level beneath various categorised subdomains at the second level.

Third-level domains have restrictions based on which second-level domain they are registered under. Registration on the second level is unrestricted, but more expensive. All fees are higher for international registrants.

=== Restrictions ===
In 2024, a number of .af domains including "broke.af" and "queer.af" went offline.

The Afghan Ministry of Communications and IT said that they were registered through Gandi, a France-based domain name registrar, and cited Gandi's failure to make payments as the reason for suspension.

== Second-level domains ==
- .gov.af
- .com.af
- .org.af
- .net.af
- .edu.af
- .tv.af
- .media.af
