= Najibullah Haqqani =

Communications Minister of Afghanistan since 2021

Najibullah Haqqani نجیب الله حقانی
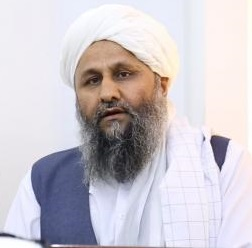
- Najibullah Haqqani

Minister of Communications
- Incumbent
- Assumed office 7 September 2021 (Note: Acting: 7 September 2021 – 15 August 2025)
- Supreme Leader: Hibatullah Akhundzada
- Prime Minister: Hasan Akhund

Deputy Minister of Finance
- In office c. 1996 – c. 2001
- Prime Minister: Mohammed Rabbani; Abdul Kabir
- Leader: Mohammed Omar
- Minister: Mohammad Ahmadi; Agha Jan Motassim; Muhammad Taher Anwari
- Succeeded by: Nasir Akhund (2021)

Personal details
- Party: Taliban
- Occupation: Politician, Taliban member

Military service
- Allegiance: Taliban (Islamic Emirate of Afghanistan)
- Branch/service: Military Affairs Commission of the Islamic Emirate of Afghanistan (2008–2010)
- Commands: Head of the Military Affairs Commission of Kunar Province
- Battles/wars: War in Afghanistan (2001–2021)

Najibullah Haqqani (Pashto: نجیب الله حقانی [nad͡ʒibʊˈlɑ haqɑˈni]) is the Minister of Communications of the Islamic Emirate of Afghanistan since 7 September 2021. He has also served various ministries in the previous government (1996–2001). He is a cousin of Noor Jalal, the Deputy Interior Minister from 7 to 21 September 2021.
