= Ministry of Communications and Information Technology (Afghanistan) =

Government ministry of Afghanistan

- Dari: وزارت مخابرات و تکنالوژی معلوماتی; Pashto: د مخابراتو او معلوماتي ټکنالوجۍ وزارت
- Ministry flag

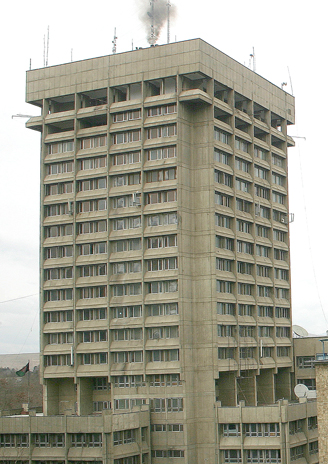
- The 18-story Ministry of Telecommunication

Ministry overview
- Formed: 1955
- Type: Ministry
- Jurisdiction: Government of Afghanistan
- Headquarters: Kabul, Afghanistan
- Minister responsible: Abdul Ahad Fazli
- Deputy Minister responsible: Saifuddin Tayeb
- Child agencies: Afghan Post; Afghan Telecom ATRA
- Website: Website of MICT

Old flag of ministry, existed during the Islamic Republic of Afghanistan.

The Ministry of Communications and Information Technology (Dari: وزارت مخابرات و تکنالوژی معلوماتی, Pashto: د مخابراتو او معلوماتي ټکنالوجۍ وزارت) (MCIT) is an organ of the government of Afghanistan. Current communications minister is Najibullah Haqqani. The Ministry was subjected to a suicide attack in 2019.

The Ministry of Communications and Information Technology provides an annual report to inform the public of advancements in Afghanistan's technological sector. At the end of 2001, there were an estimated 35,000 phones working in all of Afghanistan serving a population of 27 million, one of the lowest teledensities in the world. Calls could only be completed over satellite facilities and only among Afghanistan's six major urban areas. The Ministry of Communications with international consulting aid developed a modern telecommunications and Internet sector policy published in October 2002. That policy framework is credited with laying the foundation for transparent, private sector-led competition. As of November 2009, there are more than 10.4 million mobile subscribers, a 300-fold increase in seven years. More than $1.2 billion has been invested in the sector.

In 2003 internationally funded advisers assisted with the drafting of a new Telecom Law which was adopted by Presidential Decree in December 2005. An independent regulator was appointed June 2006 and launched competitive tenders to license new telecom services.

The telecom sector leads economic reconstruction with four mobile service providers which cover 75% of the country with over 2,400 towers in more than 250 of the largest urban areas. 50,000 direct and indirect jobs were created by the sector.

There are 15 Internet Service Providers (ISP) licensed and operating in 20 major urban areas. Afghan Telecom, an Afghan government telecom company, was incorporated in September 2006; an 80% stake in the company is being privatized from 2008.

Currently, there are an estimated 45,000 landlines and about 10,400,000 cellphone subscribers. While a number of ISPs offer services, the number of users has not been precisely researched yet.

== April 2019 attack ==
On April 20, 2019, a suicide attack on the Ministry ended with all five attackers dead, while four civilians and three police officers were killed. ISIS-K later claimed responsibility, which caused the evacuation of two government ministries.

== List of ministers ==
Minister	Tenure
Masoom Stanakzai	Unknown
Amirzai Sangin	2004 - 2014
Hessamudin Hessam	9 Dec 2014 - 17 Apr 2015
Abdul Razaq Wahidi	18 April 2015 - 15 Nov 2016 (impeached)
Sayed Sadaat	16 Nov 2016 - 6 Aug 2017 (resigned)
Shahzad Gul Aryobee	7 Aug 2017 (confirmed 4 Dec 2017) - 23 May 2019
Fahim Hashimi	24 May 2019 - 31 Aug 2020
Nisar Ahmad Ghoryani	31 Aug 2020 - 21 Nov 2020
Najibullah Haqqani	9 Jul 2021 - Unknown
Hamdullah Nomani	30 May 2025 - 21 May 2026
Abdul Ahad Fazli	21 May 2026 - present

== See also ==
- Communications in Afghanistan
- Afghan Post
- Afghan Telecom
- Sayed Sadaat, a communications minister up to 2018, but a delivery driver in Germany by August 2021
