= Roshan (telecommunications) =

Communication company in Afghanistan

- Type: Private
- Industry: Telecommunications
- Founded: 2003
- Headquarters: Afghanistan
- Key people: Karim Khoja, CEO
- Products: GSM
- Parent: AKFED
- Website: www.roshan.af

Roshan (Persian: روشن, lit. 'light') is a telecommunications development company located in Afghanistan.

== History ==
Roshan was founded by Kari Khoja in 2002.

In 2012, Roshan became the first and only company in Afghanistan to achieve B Corporation certification, awarded by B Lab. By 2014, Roshan was the largest private employer and telco in Afghanistan with 6 million subscribers, and had also started telecom and mobile money operations in Burundi, Tanzania, and Uganda under the "Smart Mobile" brand.

In October 2017, in cooperation with the Wikimedia Foundation, Roshan provided customers free access to Wikipedia and its sister projects without incurring data charges. The cooperation was part of the Wikipedia Zero project, which the Wikimedia Foundation discontinued in February 2018. The agreement with Roshan expired on December 15, 2018.

As of June 2024, Roshan's telecommunications services are available in at least one city in every province in Afghanistan.

== Shareholders ==
Roshan was founded under the ownership of the following companies:

- 51%—Aga Khan Fund for Economic Development, part of Aga Khan Development Network
- 35%—Monaco Telecom International (MTI), subsidiary of NJJ Capital (55%—since 2014, acquired from Cable & Wireless) and Principality of Monaco over Société Nationale de Financement (45%)
- 9%—MCT Corporation (former U.S. company, now part of Telia Company)
- 5%—Alcatel

The investments were held through the Telecom Development Company of Afghanistan B.V., based in Amsterdam, which holds 100% of the shares of the Telecom Development Company of Afghanistan Ltd.

In July 2004, Alcatel sold its 5% stake, distributing 3.25% to MCT and 1.75% to MTI.

In August 2020, TeliaSonera sold its 12.25% stake and Monaco Telecom sold its 36.75% stake to AKFED, making it the sole owner.

== See also ==
- List of Afghan companies
- Telecom Development Company Afghanistan
