= Afghan Telecom =

Afghan Telecom افغان تیلی کام
- Type: Governmental
- Industry: Telecommunications
- Founded: 2005
- Headquarters: Kabul, Afghanistan
- Services: Landline; GSM 3G 4G; Wireless; Broadband
- Website: Afghan Telecom

Afghan Telecom (AfTel) is a telecom company offering fixed line, wireless voice and data services under a 25-year license in Afghanistan. The company was government owned and operated but was later purchased by Azizi Bank. In 2005, the Afghan Ministry of Communications spun it off into a private entity, while retaining oversight and control.

AfTel has roughly 200,000 employees in 34 provincial capitals and 254 district centers and villages. It offers traditional wire-line telephones and internet access in the major cities, a third generation GSM-based Wireless local loop telephony, a 4G LTE and fiber-based internet services, based on switching, wireless access and satellite equipment.

Afghan Telecom is a beneficiary of a US$500 million World Bank grant to help government increase telecommunications network connectivity in Afghanistan.

In March 2018, Khyber Khan was appointed as director general and CEO and in June 2018 Mohammad Waris Fazli was appointed as Chief Information Officer to lead the ICT direction of the company.

Seeking to grow its five percent market share, Afghan Telecom acquired access to 60 to 70 mobile towers owned by Etisalat.

Following the Taliban's reassertion of control over Afghanistan, Afghan Telecom was renationalized and reintegrated into the Ministry of Communications and Information Technology (MCIT).
