= Mass media in Afghanistan =

The mass media in Afghanistan is monitored by the Ministry of Information and Culture, and includes broadcasting, digital and printing. It is mainly in Dari and Pashto, the official languages of the nation. Prior to the return of the Islamic Emirate in 2021, Afghanistan had over 107 TV stations and 284 radio stations, including 100s of print media and over 1,800 online media outlets. The number of digital media outlets is steadily increasing again with the help of Facebook, Instagram, TikTok, Twitter, YouTube, and other such online platforms. Islamic Emirate's spokesman Zabihullah Mujahid has emphasized that the media should be in line with Sharia and Afghanistan's national interests.

Following the Taliban’s return to power in 2021, media outlets and freedom of expression in Afghanistan have been severely restricted. Nai in Exile, an Afghan media advocacy group, said the Taliban are increasingly using Afghanistan’s private media as tools of state propaganda rather than relying only on censorship and violence. According to the group, outlets are forced to follow Taliban-approved narratives, language, and editorial rules, while banned content is suppressed and media are used to spread fear through propaganda material such as military displays and forced confessions. The group warned that this environment is severely damaging independent journalism and could undermine the credibility of private media in any future post-Taliban period.

== Media history ==
The first newspaper, Shams-ul-Nahar شمس النهار was published in 1873 during the rule of Sher Ali Khan.

Another newspaper, Siraj-ul-Akhbar سراج الاخبار (Lamp of the News) was initially published on January 11, 1906, with Abdul-Rauf as editor. After this first and only issue in Persian language, its publication stopped. It was revived in October 1911 by Mahmud Tarzi, the editor and owner of the newspaper who was critical of the friendship between the British Empire and Afghanistan. Mahmud Tarzi became known as the pioneer of Afghan journalism, in 1916 he famously wrote: "Siraj Al Akhbar Afghaniya is neither British, nor Russian nor French nor Italian nor German nor Chinese or Japanese. It is a Muslim newspaper and, in that, it is specifically an Afghan newspaper. Whatever it says, whatever melody it sings, is from an Afghan point of view and stems from the tone of Afghan national dignity." In 1919, under King Amanullah Khan, Aman-i-Afghan (Afghan Peace) replaced Siraj al-Akhbar, serving as an organ of the government, while several smaller private journals appeared under different ministries. Along with these developments, Radio Kabul began broadcasting in 1925, which inaugurated a new era of mass media in the country. The 1964 Constitution of Afghanistan and the Press Law of 1965 provided for freedom of the press, within the boundaries of appropriate behavior. The 1960s saw a rapid growth of television services around the world, including most developing countries. The conceptual foundation of television in Afghanistan to improve literacy rate and specific technical recommendations for initial launch were first published in 1967 by Dr. Hafiz Sahar, Chief Editor of national morning newspaper, in his academic work at New York University. It was not until 1978, due to political instability in the 1970s, that the first TV channel was launched in Kabul with grant aid from Japan. The press was editorially independent from government but was instructed to safeguard the interests of the state and constitutional monarchy, Islam, and public order. Afghan journalism progressed and developed from the 1950s through to the 1970s, though it remained limited.

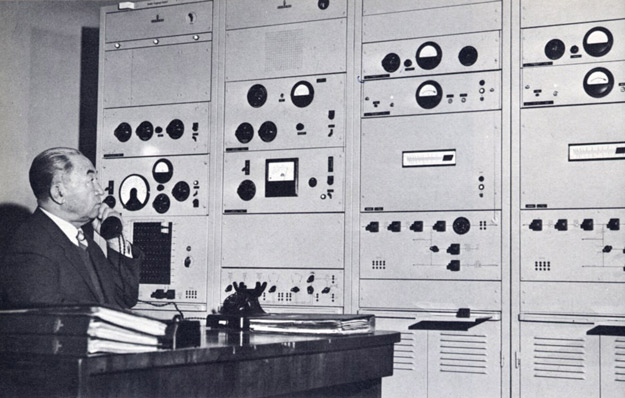
Central control panel at Radio Kabul transmitter in the 1950s. Transmitter can be heard as far distant as South Africa and Indonesia.

When King Zahir Shah's government was overthrown in the 1973 coup by his cousin Daoud Khan, approximately 19 newspapers were shut down and the media came under severe restrictions, ending a period of relative freedom. The first color television broadcasting appeared in 1978. The media fell into the control of Soviet influences during the Democratic Republic of Afghanistan from 1979 to 1992.

In the late 1990s, the media under the Taliban government was characterized by strict media laws, including the banning of television as part of its prohibition on depicting images of living beings in media. The Taliban instigated the destruction of television sets in 1998. People caught with a television in their homes were subject to monetary fines, flogging, or imprisonment. Most media operated from other countries, except for a small area in northern Afghanistan, which had its own television service called Badakhshan Television. It broadcast news and films to around 5,000 viewers for three hours a day. All television stations had been shut down by order of the Taliban, and printed newspapers were forbidden to publish commentary, photos, or readers letters. The radio stations under Taliban control broadcast nothing other than religious programs and selected news. Around 70% of the population listened to its broadcasts. In 2000, the Taliban government launched The Islamic Emirate, an English-language newspaper designed to counteract information produced by the "enemies of Islam". Only Russia, Czech Republic and Serbia had news bureaus based in Kabul due to instability. The Kabul TV center was converted into a military barracks, and journalists were not permitted to work with foreign media. The media environment remained bleak until the overthrow of the Taliban government in late 2001.

The Afghan media experienced rapid growth during the Karzai administration in the early 2000s, with dozens of TV stations reestablished around the country. Some of these include Tolo, Ariana Television Network, Lemar, Shamshad, and the state-owned Afghanistan National Television. Over two hundred radio stations have also been established. As of 2019, there are over 1,800 media outlets in the country. All media flourished under Afghanistan's new rules, though journalists do undergo self-censorship; penalties are still in place for defaming individuals and running material contrary to the principles of Islam.

Some government officials have used their positions to maintain their own communications facilities, as national and local governments own or control several dozen newspapers and many electronic media outlets. A 2004 media law prohibits censorship, but requires registration of periodicals with the Ministry of Information and Culture; in 2005 some 250 periodicals were registered. International organizations have been training new journalists since the fall of the Taliban. However, due to instability in Afghanistan, journalists have been as highly targeted as soldiers, as shown by instances of kidnapping and death threats. An NGO named Nai (meaning flute, an important symbolic instrument for broadcasting) tracks violence against journalists with its Media Watch Data. More than 100 journalists also protested a raid on a private TV station which drew concern of further government interference in reporting.

One of Afghanistan's largest independent news agencies is Pajhwok Afghan News, which was founded in 2004 by Afghan journalists who worked with the Institute for War and Peace Reporting. It has reporters in nearly every province, and publishes stories online in English, Dari and Pashto. Bakhtar News Agency, another wire service, is run by the Afghan government. Khaama Press was established by an Afghan journalist Khushnood Nabizada in 2010 with an aim to report stories in English. It later started to publish content in Persian and Pashto in addition to English.

Although many fewer Afghan women than men work as journalists, female Afghan reporters and editors are increasingly making their voices heard not just on traditionally "feminine" topics like education and health, but on larger issues affecting Afghanistan, such as the tension between tradition and modernity. Shukria Barakzai founded the weekly bilingual Women's Voice to campaign for women's rights. She was elected to the House of the People (or Wolesi Jirga, the lower house of the National Assembly of Afghanistan), and speaks up for the hopes that a better and freer press will lead to strong democracy and civil society. One of the most high-profile government attacks on press freedom occurred in 2008 when presenter Mohammad Nasir Fayyaz of Ariana Television Network was arrested for criticizing members of the cabinet. He was later released without charge. During the Afghan presidential election, 2009 there were some reports of attacks on press freedom. On April 30, 2018, nine journalists lost their lives in an insurgent bombing in Kabul, the deadliest incident against journalists since 2001. By the end of the year a total of 14 journalists and media workers had been killed in Afghanistan. In 2020, journalist Zahra Joya founded Rukhshana Media, the country's first feminist news agency. Most female Afghan journalists were forced to leave their jobs and country after the takeover. In 2022, Afghan journalists founded The Afghan Times, first Afghan media in exile.

== Digital media ==
Digital media is gradually increasing in Afghanistan. A number of online newspapers are available, including Afghanistan Times, Ariana News, Bakhtar News Agency, Jawedan, Khaama Press, Pajhwok Afghan News, TOLOnews, The Afghan Times and Voice of Jihad. In 2019, Afghanistan had about 9,240,000 regular internet users.

== Magazines ==
A popular Afghan magazine that was published in the 20th century was the Zhvandūn.

== Newspapers ==
Afghanistan has nearly 1,500 print media as of 2019. The principal daily newspapers are the state-owned Anis, Arman-e Melli, and the privately owned Afghanistan Group of Newspapers which includes The Daily Outlook Afghanistan (The first Independent English Newspaper of Afghanistan) and The Daily Afghanistan in local languages of Dari and Pashto, Cheragh, founded by first Afghan lady journalist Kathreen Wida in December 2003, Eslah, and The Afghan Times and Khaama Press My Voice Weekly Newspaper and Eradeh, Hewad, Ittefaq-e Islam, and Shari'at. The circulation of independent print publications has been confined primarily to the Kabul region. About 500 publications are now registered in the country.

== Radio ==
Radio broadcasting in Afghanistan began in 1925 with Radio Kabul being the first station. By the late 1970s most homes owned at least one radio, especially in major cities. As of 2023, the country has over 200 AM, FM and shortwave radio stations. They broadcast mainly in Pashto and Dari languages. BBC World Service, Voice of America, Radio Azadi and others have also been active in Afghanistan as additional sources of news.

== Television ==
Afghanistan currently has around 81 private and state-owned television stations. In 2019 it had over 107 such stations. They include local and international channels. One of this is state-owned Radio Television Afghanistan (RTA). Many global news channels have local bureaus in Kabul, including: Al Jazeera, BBC, CNN, DD News, Sky News, and Voice of America.

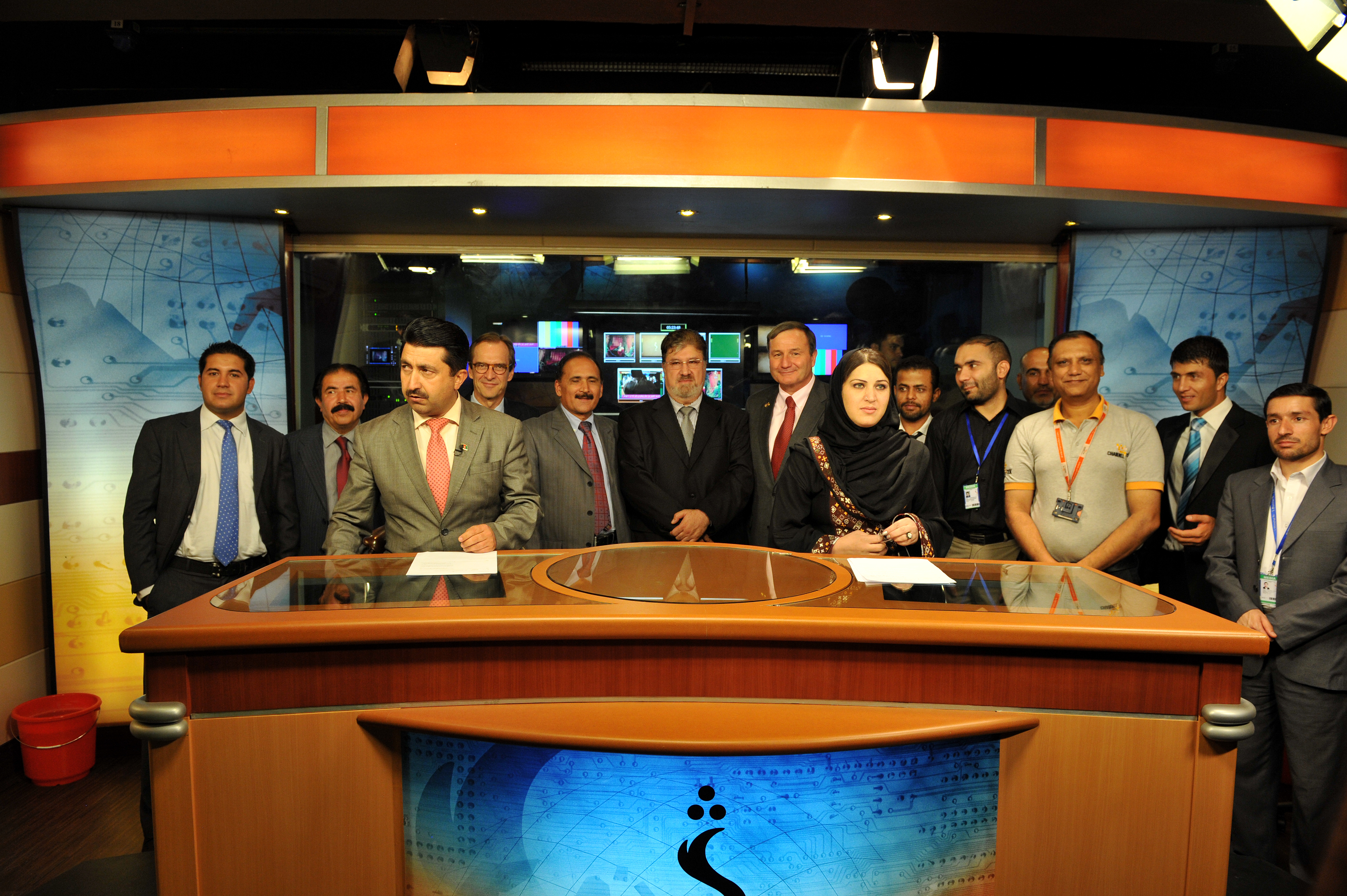
Shamshad TV studio (2010)

With a combination of national news and political programs, original reality TV shows, American programs like "24", ARIA TV has been the first exclusive channel for children and teenagers, while TOLO (TV channel) is one of the most watched station. Saad Mohseni, chairman of Tolo's parent company, MOBY Group, said Moby's revenues are in the $20 million range and the media company operates at a profit. Lemar TV, which broadcasts in Pashto language, is a sister channel of Tolo. Another channel that is mostly in Pashto is Shamshad TV, which is owned by another Afghan group. Sharq TV is another channel that broadcasts in Pashto in the Eastern zone of Afghanistan, it is owned by Shaiq Network. Baano TV is a women-dedicated channel that started in July 2017.

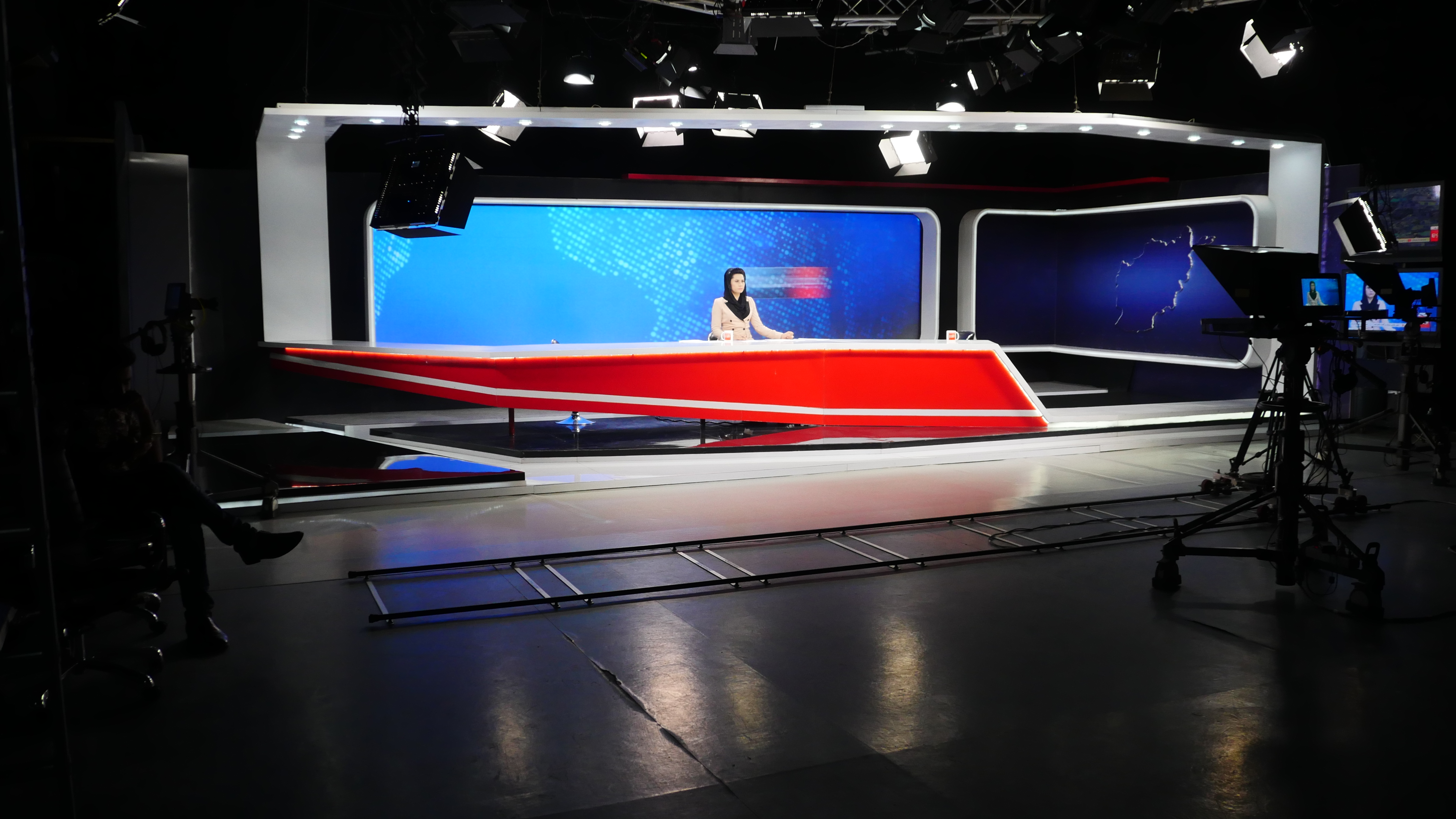
TOLOnews studio (2017)

ABS "Afghanistan Broadcast System" a part of ACG "Asian Consulting Group" start its DTTV service under the trade name of Oqaab. Oqaab (meaning “eagle” in Dari) is a digital broadcasting service that allows users to see television in digital format. Digital TV is an advanced television format that provides a much better picture and sound quality when compared to traditional analog television. Users will continue to receive local channels for free while, coming soon, expanded premium channels will be offered for a low month fee. Today many new TV channels start their Broadcasting via ABS (OQAAB). ANAAR TV was the first Digital TV (DTT) which started its broadcasting on 31 May 2015 dedicated to technology.

The following are some of the digital TV channels that have been airing programs: Khurshid TV, 1 TV, Shamshad TV, Anaar TV, Harirood TV (Now Afghanistan TV), Hadees TV, 10 TV, Mashal TV, 11TV, Meshrano Jerga TV (Parliament's 2nd TV channel) and Afghanistan Youth TV.

After the return of the Islamic Emirate of Afghanistan, there has been increasing censorship of television programs on established outlets. In March 2022, the Taliban's Ministry for the Propagation of Virtue and the Prevention of Vice announced an order that all foreign serials and dramas are to be banned from airing. This led to the arrests of three TOLOnews staffs, two of which were released hours later and one a day later. The Taliban justified this in a statement by saying "Some media outlets were reporting cases that offended the religious sentiments of the community and threatened our national security" and "In addition, the evil and vicious elements were receiving their propaganda material against the state from the contents of these media".

In October 2025, Taliban shut down Shamshad TV, a private broadcaster in Kabul, accusing it of failing to "adequately" cover the recent border fighting with Pakistan and of not defending the "Taliban’s position."

In March 2026, Taliban suspended the broadcasts of Rah-e-Farda radio and television in Kabul, a channel affiliated with Mohammad Mohaqiq. The suspension was linked to recent remarks by Mohammad Mohaqiq which reportedly criticized Taliban’s recent retaliatory attacks against Pakistan.

== See also ==
- Communications in Afghanistan
- Pashto media
