= List of Pashto-language television channels =

This is a list of Pashto-language television channels in Afghanistan, Pakistan, and other parts of world.

== Afghanistan ==
- Ashna TV (Voice of America)
- Gharghasht TV
- khyber news
- khyber watch
- Hewad TV
- Lemar TV
- Pashto TV
- RTA
- Saba TV
- Sandare TV
- Shamshad TV
- Watan TV
- Zhwandoon TV
- Pashtun Tv
- Sharq TV
- Wakht TV
- Kabul News TV
- BBC Pashto TV
- One TV

== Pakistan ==
- AVT Khyber
- Khyber News
- Aruj TV
- Paigham TV
- Pashto 1
- PTV Peshawar (Established 1974)
- Haditv Pashto
- Mashriq TV
- Atal HD TV
- Pashtun Tv
