= List of newspapers in Afghanistan =

Below is a list of newspapers published in Afghanistan.

== Newspapers ==
Newspaper	Location	First issued	Publisher	Languages	Notes
Daily Outlook Afghanistan	Kabul City	2004-2021	Afghanistan Group of Newspapers	English	Daily Outlook Afghanistan was the first ever independent English newspaper in Afghanistan. It ceased publication following the fall of Kabul.
Afghanistan Times Daily	Kabul City	2005	Shafie Rahel	English	
Bakhtar News Agency	Kabul City	1939	Government of Afghanistan	Dari, English, Pashto	
Kabul Weekly	Kabul City	1991-2011		Dari, English, Pashto	
The Kabul Times Daily	Kabul City	February 1962	Bakhtar News Agency	English	The Kabul Times is a daily (the exceptions are on Fridays and Afghan Holidays) newspaper printed in English. The first issue was published on February 27, 1962.
Khaama Press Mohajir Times		2010	Private	English, Persian, Pashto: Mohajir Times; 2023; Online; 2023; Farsi-Dari and English	The Khaama Press News Agency is one of the top and largest English news service in Afghanistan established in 2010.
Pajhwok Afghan News	Kabul City	2004	Danish Karokhel	Dari, English, Pashto	
Afghan Islamic Press	Kabul City	1982	Muhammad Yaqoub Sharafat	English, Pashto	Afghan Islamic Press (AIP) is an independent Afghan news agency founded during the Soviet occupation of Afghanistan in 1982. They distribute news reports from their correspondents in towns and cities throughout Afghanistan. They have maintained their independence by financing their journalism entirely through their commercial activities. They have refused all funding by any government, non-government organization, western or Arab institutions.
Tatobay	Kabul	2006-2021	Abdul Halim Helamyar, Ezatullah Zaki	Pashto	Weekly
Yulduz		c.1980		Uzbek	
The Afghan Times	Kabul	August, 2021	Afghan journalists	English language, Pashto and Dari	The Afghan Times operated primarily by Afghan women journalists, the publication focuses on human rights and women's issues, particularly under the Taliban regime.
Kārawān	Kabul City	September 24, 1968 / Miz̄an̄ 1, 1347-	Sạbahuddin̄ Kushkaki	Persian	Title transliterated into English : Caravan.

== See also ==
- Communications in Afghanistan
- Mass media in Afghanistan
