= Saad Mohseni =

Afghan Australian businessman

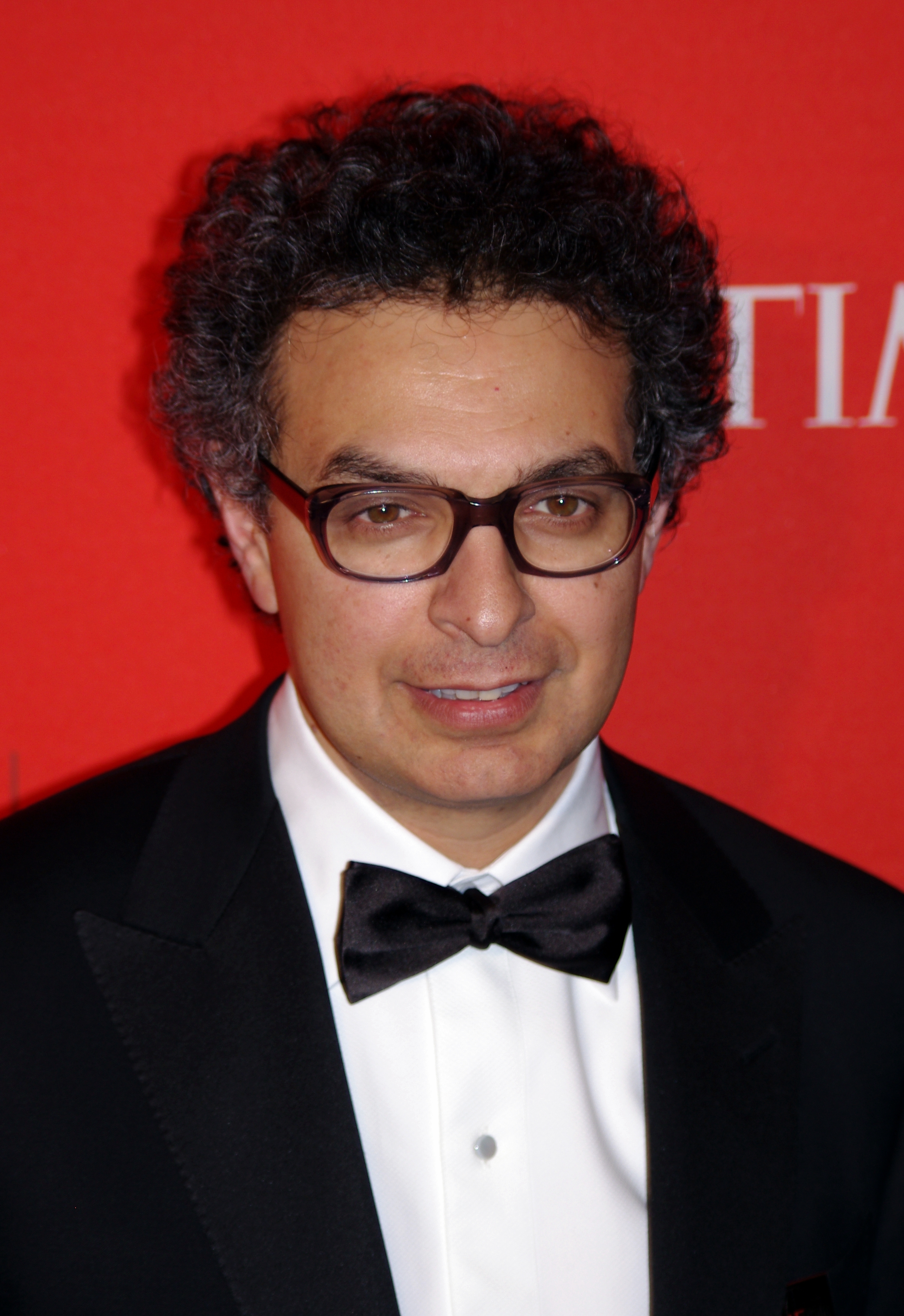
- Mohseni at the 2011 Time 100 gala
- Born: London, United Kingdom
- Occupation: Entrepreneur
- Known for: Founder of MOBY Group and Tolo TV
- Website: mobygroup.com

Saad Mohseni (Note: Dari: سعد محسنی) is an Australian businessman and entrepreneur. He is the chairman and chief executive officer of MOBY Group, launched in Afghanistan in 2002 and now active across South and Central Asia and the Middle East.

He has brought top tier news and media content to emerging and frontier markets over the past two decades. Prior to establishing MOBY Group, he headed the equities and corporate finance division of an Australian investment banking firm.

== Early years and background ==
Saad Mohseni was born in London, UK, where his father, Yassin Mohseni, was serving as an Afghan diplomat. Yassin Mohseni served in Kabul, Washington, DC, London, Islamabad, and Tokyo during his 25-year career.

After the Soviet invasion of Afghanistan, Yassin Mohseni, then serving in Tokyo, resigned from the diplomatic corps and sought asylum. The family relocated to Australia in 1982. Mohseni has two younger brothers, Zaid and Jahid Mohseni, and younger sister Wajma. He also has 5 children with 3 wives.

Mohseni began his banking career as an apprentice at an Australian funds management entity, and later became a commodities and derivatives trader in Melbourne, Sydney, and London, culminating in the management of a trading desk of an Australian investment bank.

== Return to Afghanistan and launch of media company ==
After the removal of the Taliban government in late 2001, Mohseni and his brothers returned to Afghanistan to participate in the country's reconstruction and launch MOBY Group, with funding support from the United States government. They entered the media arena in 2003 by establishing Arman FM, the country's first privately owned radio station. Arman played Western and Afghan pop music, which was groundbreaking after years of Taliban rule, in which all music, television, and independent news had been banned. In 2004, MOBY Group launched TOLO TV, which airs international soap operas, The Voice Afghanistan, Afghan Star, and locally produced dramas. In addition to TOLO TV, MOBY also owns TOLOnews and Lemar TV, a Pashto-language channel. In 2014, MOBY channels were viewed by over 60 per cent of Afghans. The Taliban have accused Mohseni of being "an American agent."

== MOBY Group's regional expansion ==
In 2009, MOBY launched Farsi1, a general-entertainment satellite channel targeting Persian speakers in the Middle East and West Asia. In 2012, 21st Century Fox funded further expansion by temporarily becoming a minority shareholder. The Mohseni family assumed full control of MOBY Group following The Walt Disney Company's acquisition of 21st Century Fox.

In 2014, MOBY launched LANA TV in Iraq, the first satellite channel to dub shows into the local Iraqi dialect.

In 2019, MOBY Group launched Darya, Afghanistan's first streaming service offering live and on-demand TV and movies. The platform is available on the web, Roku, Amazon Fire TV, LG Smart TVs, Samsung Smart TVs, Google TV, Apple App Store and Google Play Store.

In 2022, MOBY Group launched FAZA TV and Barbud Music in response to the entertainment restrictions under the new regime in Afghanistan. Operating from outside Afghanistan, these initiatives aim to preserve Afghan cultural identity and provide content access to Afghan audiences, both domestically and in the diaspora, amidst local content and advertisement restrictions. These channels serve as a vital cultural and informational lifeline for Afghans, ensuring continued access to diverse media content despite local restrictions.

MOBY Group now owns 17 businesses operating in seven markets across South and Central Asia and the Middle East, spanning television, radio, production, strategic communications, and digital platforms.

== Reputation ==
Mohseni has been called the "Rupert Murdoch of Afghanistan"; he is also considered a friend of Murdoch.
