= Ulduz (disambiguation) =

Ulduz, Uldus, Yulduz, or Yuldus is a Turkic female given name.

Ulduz, Uldus, Yulduz, or Yuldus may also refer to:

- Ulduz (Baku Metro)
- Ulduz or Julduz, Azerbaijani ZX Spectrum clone
- Ulduz (film), Azerbaijani comedy film
- Ulduz (opera), Azerbaijani opera by Fikret Amirov
- Yulduz (newspaper)

== See also ==
- Ildiz
- Yıldız (disambiguation)
- Yoldiz
