= Zhwandun =

Zhwandun (Pashto: ژوندون, life), also romanized as Zhvandun, Zhwandon may refer to:

- Zhvandūn, a former Afghan magazine that ran from 1949 to 1996
- Zhwandoon TV, an Afghan television station
