= Afghanistan and copyright issues =

Since 2008 copyright in Afghanistan has been governed by the law on the support the right of authors, composers, artists and researchers (Copy Right Law).

== International agreements ==
In 1958, Afghanistan ratified the Agreement on the Importation of Educational, Scientific and Cultural Materials, with Annexes A to E and Protocol annexed (Florence, 17 June 1950). In 1979, it accepted the Convention on the Means of Prohibiting and Preventing the Illicit Import, Export and Transfer of Ownership of Cultural Property (Paris, 14 November 1970) and in 2005 it ratified the Convention concerning the Protection of the World Cultural and Natural Heritage (Paris, 16 November 1972). It acceded to the WIPO treaty on 13 September 2005, which came into action at the end of the year.

In November 2003, the Copyright World journal reported that a group, Intellectual Property Working Group of the Afghanistan Transitional Commercial Law Project, had been working on setting up the first patent or copyright system for the country, and updating its trademark laws. It is a joint project of Center for International Management Education (CIME) and the American Bar Association's "Asia Law Initiative" (ABA-Asia).

Afghanistan joined the WTO in 2016. Since 2 June 2018 the Berne Convention is in effect in Afghanistan.

== Relations with the United States ==
As of 2005, Afghanistan has no official copyright relations with the United States, resulting in works published in Afghanistan not being copyrighted in the United States, and vice versa.

In October 2007, the US Department of Commerce and the Afghanistan Ministry of Commerce and Industry signed a joint agreement to establish a forum for commercial cooperation including establishing intellectual property rights protection and enforcement.

Since joining the WTO in 2016, Afghanistan works are automatically restored in the U.S. 17 U.S.C Section 104A. To determine which are eligible, an individual must look to Afghanistan law at the time that they joined the WTO or Berne, whichever is older. Only works still under copyright are eligible. For Afghanistan, the term of copyright is life plus 50 for individual and joint works, and for paintings, photographs, and audiovisual works the term is 50 years from first publication.

That means that works whose authors died before 1972 are not restored in the U.S., and paintings, photographs, and audiovisual works published before 1972 are not restored.

The term for restored works? For works published before 1978: the term is 95 years from publication. 17 U.S.C. Section 304. For all other works (published on or after Jan 1, 1978 and unpublished works), the term is life of the author plus seventy years, or 95/120 for anonymous and work for hire. 17 U.S.C. Section 302.

== RTA incident ==
In 2005, Deputy-Minister of Information and Culture Saied Aqa Husain Sancharaki stated that a copyright law was forthcoming, which prompted the National Independent Commission for Radio and Television Broadcasting to circulate a statement requesting that media outlets either pay royalties or cease distributing material that had been created by Radio Television Afghanistan as the outlet began transforming to a public broadcaster. It was later pointed out that RTA had no right to make such an autonomous declaration.

The move was criticised by the heads of Ayna TV and Tolo TV, who argued that the cost of royalties meant that potential independent media outlets could not afford to broadcast, and the lack of independent media in the country meant broadcasters relied on RTA footage to play "a significant cultural role...filling this void". The act contradicted the ministry's edict to "promote national culture and traditions" by outlawing the broadcast of the majority of the country's traditional films, music and programming.

== Trademarks ==
Trademarks and service marks are both registered for renewable ten-year terms through the Ministry of Foreign Affairs in Afghanistan, which has adopted the 8th edition of the International Classification of Goods and Services.

== See also ==
- Iran and copyright issues
