= Candidate (disambiguation) =

A candidate is a person or thing seeking or being considered for some kind of position:

Candidate may also refer to:

- Candidate solution, in mathematics
- Candidates Tournament, a qualification event for the World Chess Championship
- Candidate (degree)

== Film ==
- The Candidate (1959 film), an Argentine drama film
- The Candidate (1964 film) by Robert Angus, aka Party Girls for the Candidate, aka The Playmates and the Candidate
- The Candidate (1972 film) by Michael Ritchie, with Robert Redford
- The Candidate (1980 film) by Stefan Aust, Alexander Kluge, Volker Schlöndorff, Alexander von Eschwege, German title: Der Kandidat
- The Candidate (1998 film), Taiwanese film by Neil Peng
- The Candidate (2008 film) by Kasper Barfoed, Danish title: Kandidaten
- Candidate (2013 film) by Jonáš Karásek, Slovak title: Kandidát
- The Realm (2018 film) by Rodrigo Sorogoyen, also known as The Candidate, Spanish title: El reino

== Television ==
=== Episodes ===
- "The Candidate", Arrow season 4, episode 2 (2015)
- "The Candidate", Bingles episode 9 (1993)
- "The Candidate", Bob and Margaret season 4, episode 7 (2001)
- "The Candidate", Bob Hope Presents the Chrysler Theatre season 1, episode 8 (1963)
- "The Candidate", Carson's Law episode 25 (1983)
- "The Candidate", Caitlin's Way season 1, episode 17 (2000)
- "The Candidate", Cousin Skeeter season 2, episode 14 (1999)
- "The Candidate", Designing Women season 3, episode 2 (1988)
- "The Candidate", Doc (2001) season 4, episode 3 (2003)
- "The Candidate", Dude, That's My Ghost! episode 25 (2013)
- "The Candidate", Duet season 2, episode 16 (1988)
- "The Candidate", Falcon Crest season 1, episode 13 (1982)
- "The Candidate", Family Guy season 21, episode 10 (2022)
- "The Candidate", Family Matters season 1, episode 20 (1990)
- "The Candidate", Frasier season 2, episode 7 (1994)
- "The Candidate", Green Acres season 4, episode 5 (1968)
- "The Candidate", Harry and the Hendersons season 3, episode 2 (1992)
- "The Candidate", Hang Time season 1, episode 8 (1995)
- "The Candidate", Katts and Dog season 1, episode 16 (1989)
- "The Candidate", Lost season 6, episode 14 (2010)
- "The Candidate", Moesha season 6, episode 8 (2000)
- "The Candidate", My Dad the Rock Star season 1, episode 6 (2003)
- "The Candidate", Nasty Boys episode 6 (1990)
- "The Candidate", Peter Gunn season 3, episode 4 (1960)
- "The Candidate", Plebs series 2 episode 6 (2014)
- "The Candidate", Robin's Nest season 3, episode 2 (1978)
- "The Candidate", Saving Me season 2, episode 3 (2023)
- "The Candidate", Scandal season 5, episode 11 (2016)
- "The Candidate", Schitt's Creek season 2, episode 7 (2016)
- "The Candidate", Sister, Sister season 3, episode 20 (1996)
- "The Candidate", Someone to Watch Over Me episode 48 (2016)
- "The Candidate", Spender series 1, episode 4 (1991)
- "The Candidate", Teech episode 9 (1991)
- "The Candidate", The Amazing World of Gumball season 6, episode 10 (2018)
- "The Candidate", The Basil Brush Show series 3, episode 10 (2004)
- "The Candidate", The Buzz on Maggie episode 3a (2005)
- "The Candidate", The Courtship of Eddie's Father season 3, episode 2 (1971)
- "The Candidate", The Don Rickles Show episode 8 (1972)
- "The Candidate", The Facts of Life season 7, episode 21 (1986)
- "The Candidate", The Freak Brothers season 1, episode 7 (2021)
- "The Candidate", The Practice season 6, episodes 1–2 (2001)
- "The Candidate", The Wonder Years season 4, episode 10 (1991)
- "The Candidate", Too Something episode 18 (1996)
- "The Candidate", What a Country! episode 24 (1987)
- "The Candidate", What's Happening Now!! season 3, episode 7 (1987)

=== Shows ===
- The Candidate (TV series), an Afghan TV series supported by the CEPPS agreement
- La candidata, a Mexican telenovela
- El Candidato (2020), known as The Candidate in English, a Mexican TV series.

== Literature ==
- The Candidate, a 1764 poem by Charles Churchill
- Le Candidat, an 1874 play by Gustave Flaubert
- The Candidate, a 1905 novel by Joseph Alexander Altsheler
- The Candidates, a 1968 novel by Bernard Shrimsley
- The Candidate, a 2016 novel by Lis Wiehl with Sebastian Stuart; the second entry in the Erica Sparks series
- The Candidate: Jeremy Corbyn’s Improbable Path to Power, a 2016 non-fiction by Alex Nunns

== Music ==
- Candidate (band), a British rock group
- The Candidate (album), a 1979 album by Steve Harley
- "Candidate" (David Bowie song)
- "Candidate" (Joy Division song)

== See also ==
- Candidate of Sciences, a post-graduate scientific degree in many former Eastern Bloc countries
