= RTA Kandahar =

Afghan state owned television broadcaster

- Country: Afghanistan
- Broadcast area: Kandahar
- Headquarters: Kandahar

Programming
- Picture format: 720p HDTV

Ownership
- Owner: Radio Television Afghanistan
- Sister channels: RTA Sport; RTA News; RTA Education

History
- Launched: February 1985; 40 years ago

Links
- Webcast: rta.af/live
- Website: rta.af

RTA Kandahar is a relay station of Afghanistan National Television. The station broadcasts radio and television signals in Kandahar Province in south-eastern Afghanistan, bordering Pakistan.

== History ==
Radio broadcasts started in 1974. The television station was commissioned in 1983, beginning its broadcasts in February 1985, as part of an expansion plan from RTA to bring television outside Kabul. In October-November 1994, the Taliban took over and the station was taken off the air, two years before the Taliban did the same to the station in Kabul. Journalist Mohamad Kabir fled to Kabul where he worked at the main RTA station until the Taliban takeover in 1996. In 2001, following the defeat of the Taliban, the station resumed operations.

A 2010 USAid report noted that the radio station broadcast for fifteen hours a day (7am to 10pm) on 1305kHz AM and 105.2 FM. At the time, it planned to increase its broadcasting hours to eighteen. Television broadcasts were held from 4pm to 11pm, but also planned to expand the number of hours to eighteen. It broadcast eight programs, the majority were in the Pashto language. As with most RTA outlets, it refused to carry news about corruption in the government, which was reserved for private outlets. Nonetheless, it was the second most-popular radio outlet in the province per an Arghandab survey, with a 37% approval rate behind AIR's 51%. On television, the survey tied it in third place with ATN at 38%, behind Lemar at 45% and Hewad at 48%.
