= Tatobay =

Newspaper in Kabul, Afghanistan

Tatobay Weekly (Pashto:ټاټوبی اوونيزه)
- Type: Newspaper
- Format: Broadsheet
- Owner: Halim
- Founder: Abdul Halim Hilmyar
- Publisher: Mohammad Naim
- Editor-in-chief: Shoaib Khan
- Editor: Salim Khan
- Associate editor: Atiqullah Afghan
- Managing editor: Sahil Khan
- News editor: Abdul Samad
- Campus editor: Maten Khan
- Photo editor: Ibrahim Ayan
- Staff writers: Akbar Aftab
- Founded: (2006 - Present)
- Political alignment: Independent
- Language: Pashto
- Headquarters: Kabul Afghanistan
- Circulation: (10,000 - Weekly)
- Website: Tatobaynews.com

Tatobay (Pashto: ټاټوبی اوونيزه) is a Pashto language weekly newspaper based in Kabul, Afghanistan. It covers politics, entertainment, business, interest, social, sports, tech, vox pop, health, art, and cultural issues and news of the week.

== History ==
Tatobay Weekly Newspaper was established in 2006 as a 12-page, full-color newspaper.

The Newspaper is printing (10000) copies weekly in a standard shape on Broadsheet paper & distributing in the Kabul, Kandahar, Uruzgan, Helmand, Zabul, and Ghazni provinces of Afghanistan, also in Quetta, Chaman, and the Kuchlak area of Pakistan.

Tatobay Newspaper plan to cover all of Afghanistan provinces in the future.

== Publications ==
The newspaper has also held its print publications in the light of the Afghanistan national & Media/Press laws & enforcement rules in the past 10-years.

We found ourselves in the past 10-year period, that most areas of Afghanistan are still part of print media activities and print publications, Especially the South Zone of the country because we have more emphasis on print media activities add to the capital Kabul in the South Zone.

== Breaking News Resource ==
Tatobay Media Group launched a breaking news website Tatobaynews.com in April 2014, which currently has millions of readers and viewers.

== See also ==
- List of newspapers in Afghanistan
- Pashto media
- Afghan media
