= The Candidate (TV series) =

2009 Afghan reality TV show

- Created by: Tolo TV network
- Presented by: Jawed Jurat
- Country of origin: Afghanistan
- No. of seasons: 1

Original release
- Network: TOLO
- Release: 2009

The Candidate is a 2009 Afghan reality TV show that mirrors the Afghan election. Six youths under 22 try to convince the audience that they should stay on the show. The audience votes on their favourite candidate through text messaging.

== Premise ==
The Candidate had its first season in 2009. The show, hosted by Jawed Jurat, featured 6 youth, 22 years or younger, discussing political positions and then voted on by viewers until one was elected at the end of the season. The season finale was just weeks before the hotly contested 2009 presidential election. The show received tens of thousands of SMS text message votes. Tolo chief Jahid Mohseni said that the concept of the show was about how to educate the public on choosing a political candidate. Mohseni told TIME magazine, "One of the critical problems ... it's all about who the person is, his family or his ethnicity. It's never about policy and it is never about the outcome you want. So we thought a program based on a competition about policies could change that." Contestants are given a monthly allowance of $1,300 to spend on real-world campaigning — posters, rallies and travel to other provinces in an effort to gather more "votes".

== Production ==
The show was produced by the Tolo TV network. Part of its funding and support came from the CEPPS agreement, a cooperative agreement supporting the election and civil society process in Afghanistan.

== Contestants ==
The following contestants were among the six on the 2009 season:

- Mujiburahman Poya
- Ahmed Farid Danish
- Ajuba Dadqiq (the only female candidate)
- Munir Farahmand - Contest winner

== Controversy ==
The first contestant to voted off the show was Mujiburahman Poya instead of quietly accepting the texting results he stormed off the stage. Back stage cameras captured Poya hinting about how the show's results were rigged, "After this, it is clear that I must move ahead by force, not by talent," he shouted. "Afghanistan is not ready for democracy. If people want it, there is hope, but now no one is thinking about their future. They are not thinking about who they choose, so that is why they suffer."
