= Gorbat Radio Television =

- Type: Satellite Television Network
- Country: Afghanistan
- Availability: Jamal Maina, Kabul, Afghanistan
- Key people: Nabi Sahill
- Official website: http://www.gorbatnews.com

Gorbat Radio Television (Pashto: ګوربت راديو ټلويزيون) is a Pashto language private radio and television station based in Kabul, Afghanistan. The station started radio broadcasts in 2010 as an apolitical outlet; on March 5, 2011, it expanded its coverage area to Kandahar, broadcasting eighteen hours a day.

== See also ==
- List of television channels in Afghanistan
