= Hosai Ahmadzai =

Pakistani shepherdesses

- Born: Afghanistan
- Occupation: television news anchor
- Awards: 100 Women (BBC) (2023)

Hosai Ahmadzai is an Afghan news anchor. She was one of only two female news anchors in Afghanistan in the days after the Taliban takeover of Afghanistan following the fall of Kabul in 2021. Ahmadzai was included in the list of BBC 100 Women in 2023.

== Biography ==
Ahmadzai has a law and political science background and has been working in the media since 2016. She focuses on women's education, which the Taliban has severely limited. As one of the few female news anchors in Afghanistan, Ahmadzai continued to broadcast when the Taliban took over the country in August 2021. Despite concerns about her safety and societal opposition to women in the media, she carried on with her work at Shamshad TV. Since then, Ahmadzai has spoken with a number of Taliban representatives, but she is limited in the questions she may ask them. Recognising her bravery, she was included to the list of BBC 100 Women in November 2023.
