= Rukhshana Media =

Afghan women's media organisation

- رسانه رخشانه
- Types: news website
- Website: rukhshana.com

Rukhshana Media (Dari: رسانه رخشانه) is an Afghan women's media organisation created in November 2020 in memory of Rukhshana, a young woman stoned to death in 2015 in Ghor Province for having fled with a lover after a forced marriage.

== Creation ==
Rukhshana Media was created in November 2020 by Zahra Joya to focus on stories by and about Afghan women. "Rukhshana" was a reference to a teenager with this name from Ghor Province who was accused of adultery and stoned to death in 2015. A video of the lapidation circulated widely, gaining widespread international attention. Rukhshana's killing was one of several cases of the so-called honour killings of women fleeing forced marriages or of women rape victims in Ghor Province in the mid 2010s.

== Themes ==
Themes published by Rukhshana Media include "women's reproductive health, domestic and sexual violence, and gender discrimination". During the 2021 Taliban offensive, Rukhshana Media reported on expectations that the Taliban would violate women's rights and that divorced women remaining single expected to be at risk from the Taliban. In July 2021, Rukhshana Media together with Time and The Fuller Project reported on school being forbidden to "thousands" of girls in Taliban-occupied areas of Afghanistan, with teachers at girls' schools receiving death threats and being refused authorisation to teach. According to the report, only girls up to the age of 12 were allowed to attend school, they were required to wear niqābs or burqas, and the number of hours teaching the Quran was increased.

== Development ==
On 15 August 2021, the date of the Fall of Kabul, Rukhshana Media announced its plans to launch a version of its news website in English, in addition to its existing Dari reports.

== Security risks ==
During the 2021 Taliban offensive, Rukhshana Media journalists were at risk, due to the high risk of assassination of female journalists. Columbia Journalism Review described risks to Afghan journalists in general and women journalists in particular as remaining high following the 15 August 2021 fall of Kabul to Taliban forces.

== See also ==
- BaanoTV (TV channel)
- The Afghan Times
