= Maihan TV =

Television channel in Herat, Afghanistan

- Country: Afghanistan

Programming
- Picture format: SDTV

Ownership
- Owner: Maihan TV Organization

Links
- Website: http://www.maihantv.com/

Maihan TV (Persian: تلویزیون میهن) is a television network channel in Herat, Afghanistan.

== See also ==
- Television in Afghanistan
