= State Welfare Organization of Iran =

Charitable social work agency overview
- Annual budget: 13000 billion toman

The State Welfare Organization of Iran, also known as the Behzisti Organization, is a working organization under the Ministry of Cooperatives, Labour, and Social Welfare. Established after the 1979 revolution, the organization mainly works towards the betterment, rehabilitation, and improvement of the lives of disabled people, people in need of care, and orphaned children. It supervises and runs special needs education, addiction treatments (except article 16 centers) and offers suicide awareness events.

== National counseling telephone hotline callcenter ==
1480 telephone number offers educational and schoolkid, psychological, addiction rehabilitation, marriage, stress and fear, children and family counseling. It receives around two millio calls a year.

== History ==
Until 2003, formerly it was under the Iranian Ministry of Health and Medical Education.

Since 2021, people covered by the organization are exempt from energy bills.

Since 2022, the organization began developing housing projects.

In 2021–2023, Iranian Etemad reported child physical torture in a Behzisti center; two administrators were subsequently arrested. Sharq reported the cover-up of deaths of disabled people in agency centers.

== Programs ==
In "peace" program people put requests for counseling experts to be sent to at places/family or friends gatherings.

Seven and a half million people use the organization's programs.

The organization keeps a database of old people and retirement homes.

This organization operates a social work national emergency hotline.

The organization offers monthly salary and health care insurance to the around 760,000 people in need and those having disabilities.

== See also ==
- Imam Khomeini relief foundation
