= Moby Media Group =

Afghan media company

Moby Group
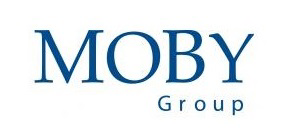
- Type: Private
- Industry: Television; media; radio; publications
- Founded: 2002
- Founder: Saad Mohseni, Zaid Mohseni, Jahid Mohseni, Wajma Mohseni
- Headquarters: Kabul, Afghanistan
- Area served: South Asia, Central Asia, Middle East, Africa
- Key people: Saad Mohseni (Founder and CEO)
- Number of employees: 1,200 (2023)
- Website: Moby Media Group

Moby Media Group (Pashto: د موبي ډله/Dari: گروه موبی) is the largest media company in Afghanistan. Moby Group is privately owned, with headquarters in Kabul and 15 bureaus throughout Afghanistan. The company also has an office in Dubai, where regional business is conducted.

== History ==
Moby Group was founded by Afghan entrepreneur Saad Mohseni with the start-up help of United States government money and with a cash injection from News Corporation, led by his friend Rupert Murdoch. The company has partnered with Voice of America in Afghanistan, and the US government has continued funding some of its broadcasts.

Mohseni is an Afghan-Australian who returned to his native Afghanistan in 2002. He is the founder and chief executive officer of Moby Group. Based in the Afghan capital Kabul, as of 2023 the company employed over 1200 staff across 16 businesses.

In 2015, the Taliban labeled TOLO TV a 'propaganda network'.

In 2016, its subsidiary Lapis was paid AU$1.6 million for promoting an "anti-refugee" film commissioned by the Australian Department of Immigration. The film was also broadcast on TOLO TV.

Besides Afghanistan, Moby Group also has offices in the UAE, Pakistan, and Ethiopia.

== Group structure ==
The company has three divisions:

- Moby Media Group, with the broadcast brands TOLOnews, TOLO TV, Lemar TV, Arman FM, Kana TV, Barbud Music, Kaboora, Toot and Darya streaming service, along with production, media distribution, talent management, print media and directories.
- Moby Technology Group, which operates technology companies Afghan ITT and 456 in the IT&T and Interactive voice response arenas.
- Moby People Group, which includes the advertising agency Lapis and the AndeshaGah Internet café chain.

== See also ==
- Internet in Afghanistan
- Communications in Afghanistan
- Mass media in Afghanistan
