= Afghanistan Group of Newspapers =

Print media group in Afghanistan

- Type: Daily newspaper
- Format: Broadsheet
- Founded: 2004
- Language: English
- Headquarters: Kabul
- Website: www.outlookafghanistan.net www.dailyafghanistan.com

The Afghanistan Group of Newspapers is a group of print media in Afghanistan which includes The Daily Afghanistan (launched in 2006) and prominent English-language paper The Daily Outlook Afghanistan.

Its newspapers, in English, Dari, and Pashto, are published in print form in Kabul and distributed to most provinces of Afghanistan. The contents are also published online.
