= RTA Herat =

Afghan state owned television broadcaster

- Country: Afghanistan
- Broadcast area: Herat
- Headquarters: Herat

Programming
- Picture format: 720p HDTV

Ownership
- Owner: Radio Television Afghanistan
- Sister channels: RTA Sport; RTA News; RTA Education

History
- Launched: February 1985

Links
- Webcast: rta.af/live
- Website: rta.af

RTA Herat is a relay station of Afghanistan National Television. The station broadcasts in Herat Province in western Afghanistan.

== History ==
The station was commissioned in 1983, beginning its broadcasts in February 1985. The station was taken off the air in 1996 by the order of the Taliban. From the beginning, it operated on VHF channel 7.

The station returned to the air on November 29, 2001, alongside all stations shut down in 1996 except Badakhshan. The Herat station restarted in a precarious manner, broadcasting for no less than three hours a day. The first news report was about the first local elections in 30 years, won by a former diplomat and Taliban representative. A few weeks later on January 14, 2002, the station received a technical boost from Iranian technicians, who in addition allowed the cross-border to rebroadcast of three over-the-air IRIB networks.

On May 15, 2008, a journalist working at the station, Nilofer Habibi, was attacked.
