= TOLOnews =

Afghan news channel and website

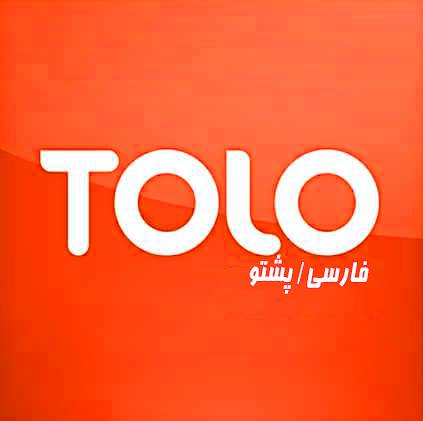
- Country: Afghanistan
- Broadcast area: Worldwide
- Headquarters: Kabul

Programming
- Languages: Persian and Pashto

Ownership
- Owner: MOBY Group
- Sister channels: TOLO TV, Lemar TV, Arman FM and Tolo Music (Web)

History
- Launched: August 2010; 15 years ago

Links
- Website: www.tolonews.com

Availability

Streaming media
- YouTube: Watch Live

Tolo News (Dari and Pashto: طلوع‌نیوز), stylized TOLOnews, is an Afghan news channel and website broadcasting from Kabul. Owned by the Moby Media Group, it was launched in August 2010 as Afghanistan's first twenty-four hour news channel.

TOLOnews is available on terrestrial television across Afghanistan, as well as internationally via satellite and the internet. Its news bulletins are also published online, and are available in Dari, Pashto, and English. Its main studio is in Kabul, and its sister TV channels are TOLO and Lemar.

== History ==
TOLOnews was launched in August 2010 as a sister channel to TOLO TV, dedicated solely to local, national, and international news. As of August 2021, its owner is Afghan Australian businessman Saad Mohseni, while Lotfullah Najafizada served as director news from 2010 until 2021. For his work on the channel, Najafizada was named a Press Freedom Hero by Reporters Without Borders in 2016.

Following the fall of Kabul on 15 August 2021 and the establishment of what the Taliban regime calls the Islamic Emirate of Afghanistan, TOLOnews received international attention after a Taliban spokesman was interviewed on the channel by a female journalist. Mohseni stated he intended to continue broadcasting TOLOnews, and that he would do so from the Middle East or Europe if the Taliban were to shut down the channel's operations in Afghanistan.

The Taliban has allowed TOLOnews to continue broadcasting, though not without incidents. In August 2021, a TOLOnews cameraman was beaten by five Taliban soldiers while reporting on the fall of Kabul. On 16 March 2022, TOLOnews' studio in Kabul was stormed by fifteen Taliban gunman who arrested three employees, including reporter Bahram Aman, chief of news Khapalwak Safi, and the channel's legal advisor Nafi Khaliq. This was believed to have been in response to a story broadcast by TOLOnews about the Taliban's decision to ban the airing of foreign television shows; the Taliban said such comments offended the "religious sentiments" of the country. All three men were subsequently released.

TOLOnews continues to employ female reporters and journalists, under conditions such as the Taliban-approved wearing of hijab, and curtains set up in their studios to separate men and women. According to Saad Mohseni, CEO of the MOBY Group, which owns the channel, "From a news perspective, at least, it's almost the same as it was before. There's no story that we cannot cover. Perhaps with not as much fanfare as we used to and we sometimes have to be careful in the way we criticise the authorities". On the importance of continuing to employ women, Mohseni noted "I think we are the canary in the coalmine. When people talk about women getting silenced, as long as they're on television, we know that they haven't been fully silenced".

On 13 May 2026, the Taliban announced the detention of two of the network's journalists, namely anchor Imran Danish and political editor Mansoor Niazi, on unspecified charges.

== Presenters (current and former) ==
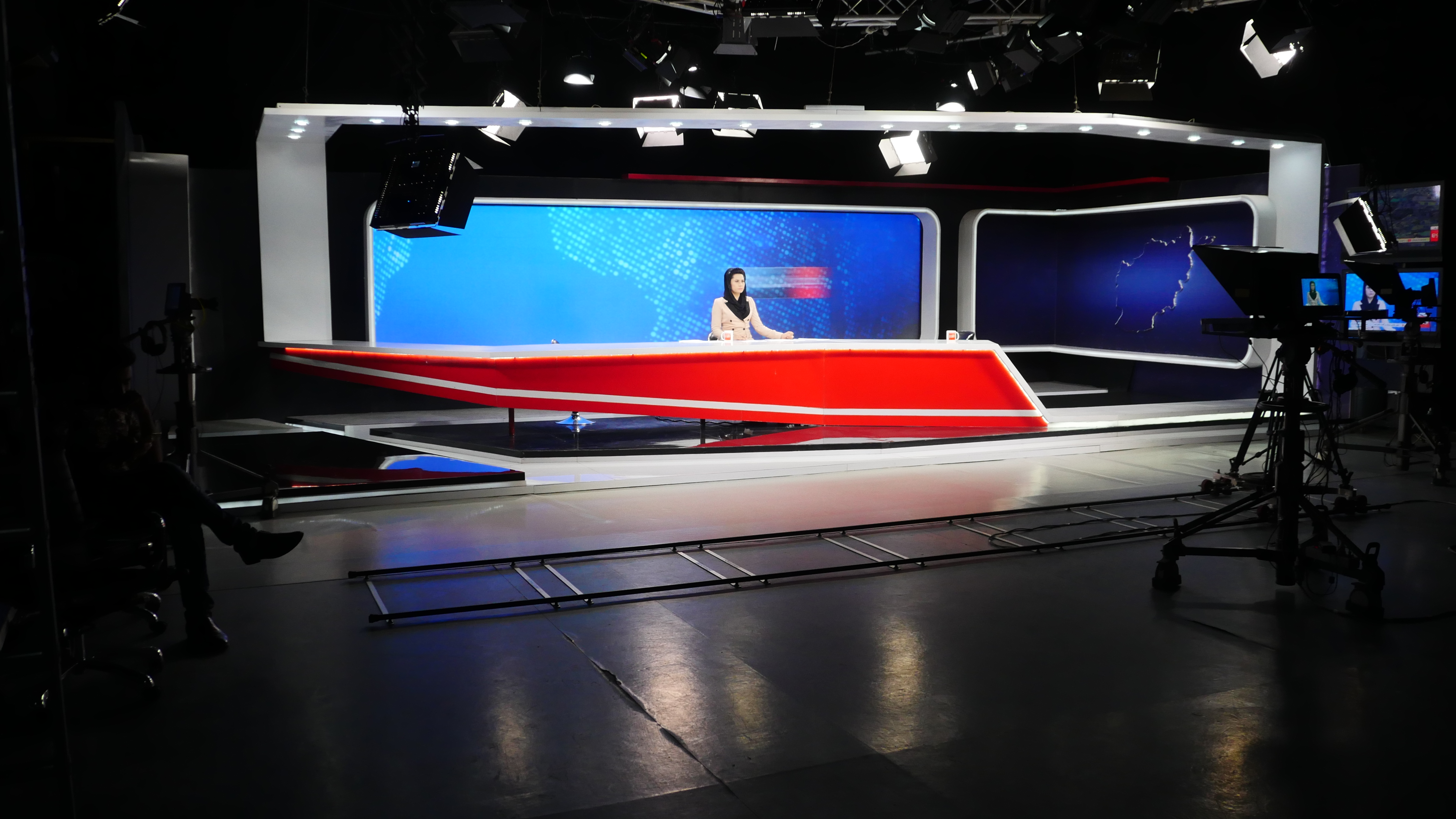
Studio

Dari

- Wahid Ahmadi
- Bahram Aman
- Tahmina Usmani
- Sebghat Sepehr
- Shuja Zaki
- Zarmina Mohammadi
- Yama Siawash († 2020)
- Naimat Rawan († 2021)
- Sonia Niazi

Pashto

- Faridullah Mohammadi
- Beheshta Arghand (until 2021)

== See also ==
- Television in Afghanistan
- Tolo TV
- Moby Media Group
