= Gharghasht TV =

Television station in Khost, Afghanistan

- Type: Satellite Television Network
- Country: Afghanistan
- Availability: Khost, Afghanistan
- Key people: Sakhi Sarwar Miakhel
- Launch date: October 23, 2010

Gharghasht TV (Pashto: غرغښت) is a Pashto language private television station based in Khost, Afghanistan. It formally started broadcasting on October 23, 2010.

The channel can also be viewed across the border in North Waziristan, Pakistan.

== See also ==
- List of television channels in Afghanistan
