= ANAAR TV =

Anaar TV تلویزیون انار
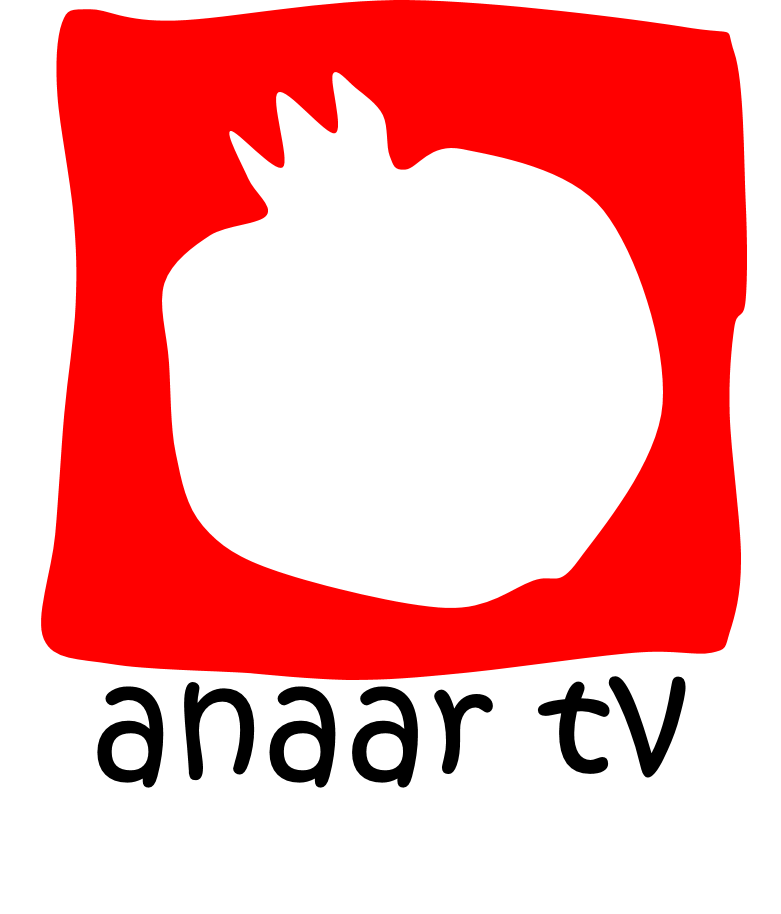
- Country: Afghanistan

Programming
- Picture format: 1080p (HDTV), 16:9

Ownership
- Owner: Noorwali Totakhil Baryalay Paikan Noori

History
- Launched: 31 May 2015
- Closed: 10 Nov 2017

Links
- Website: www.anaar.tv

Availability

Terrestrial
- DTTV: Ch# 29 (Kabul)

ANAAR TV (Persian: تلویزیون انار) was a commercial television station in Kabul, Afghanistan. This channel was launched early after DDTV startup on 31 May 2015. It became one of the first digital terrestrial television (DTTV) stations dedicated to technology, and later became Afghanistan's first English language entertainment channel. The channel was broadcast via Oqaab DTTV on channel 29, and from 17 January 2016 onward was available on Yahsat.

The channel broadcasts popular English TV series with Dari and Pashto subtitles.

As the only English entertainment and technology channel, the channel often faces threats from extremists. After the 7 November 2017 attack on Shamshad TV, the management decided to suspend transmission due to threats, without prior notice.
