= Eagle Four =

Afghan TV series

- Genre: Action/Drama
- Created by: Sean Lynch
- Original language: Dari
- No. of episodes: 13

Production
- Running time: 22 minutes
- Production company: Tolo TV

Original release
- Release: October 29, 2010

Eagle Four (Oqaab Chaar) is an Afghan 13 part police action/drama series broadcast on Tolo TV. Originally broadcast in 2010, the show is about an elite Afghan Police unit solving crimes and fighting Taliban insurgents. The series was written and directed by Sean Lynch.

The team of four elite police officers consist of two women and two men - promoting the idea that women can work together as equals in the police force.

According to the Associated Press, "The Taliban have long used Afghanistan's corruption and lawlessness as a recruiting tool, promising stability and the rule of law through strict Islamic justice." Recruitment for the Afghan National Police increased after the show was played on TV, and the show was intended to represent ANP officers as hard-working and professional. The series is funded by the United States as a form of soft power that complements their financial support for the Afghan National Police.

Trudi-Ann Tierney described producing the series in her 2014 memoir Making Soapies in Kabul, commenting that shows are often funded by NATO groups with the intention of influencing audience "values and behaviour to suit the objectives of NATO and its allies." In a 2014 interview she stated "a lot of the shows I worked on, the drama serials, they were actually funded by external clients and used as a way to convey positive messaging to the Afghan audiences. So we'd have in our shows messaging around women's rights, the importance of education, particularly for young girls, health issues, the dangers of insurgency in the community, and of course, the shows had to be entertaining, otherwise, no-one would watch them, but my writing team became very adept at weaving these messaging ideas into the storylines."

== See also ==
- Tolo TV
- Soft power § United States
