= Zhwandoon TV =

Pashto televation station

Zhwandoon Tv
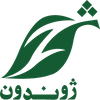
- Country: Afghanistan

Programming
- Picture format: 576i (16:9 and 4:3) (SDTV)

Ownership
- Sister channels: AVT Khyber; Shamshad TV; Khyber News; Peace TV

History
- Launched: 21 March 2011

Links
- Website: www.zhwandoon.tv

Zhwandoon TV (Pashto: ژوندون - means"Life") is a Pashto-Dari language television station based in Kabul, Afghanistan .

== Satellite details ==
Zwandoon TV Satellite details: AsiaSat 3S, frequency 3683 MHz, symbol rate 2074ksps, FEC 3/4 Vertical polarisation. If you have the signal for Khyber TV than only change the frequency and symbols rate.

== See also ==
- List of television channels in Afghanistan
