= Jawedan.com =

News outlet in Afghanistan

Jawedan.com نشریه جاودان
- Country: Afghanistan
- Founded: 2007 by Jawedan Foundation
- Key people: Abdullah Kerami; Mirwais Bakhshi; Waheed Ahmadi
- Official website: jawedan.com

Jawedan.com (Persian: جاودان، نوای آزادی) (Pashto: جاودان، آزادی غږ) is a web-based news, analysis and commentary outlet which covers politics and culture in Afghanistan. Jawedan aims mainly at promoting and defending democracy, the rule of law, respect for human rights and promotion of cultural and political pluralism in Afghanistan. Furthermore, the outlet provides alternative to conservative online papers by breaking taboos on publishing (non-editorial) op-eds and commentaries concerning ethnic issues and other social injustices. Jawedan is the Persian word for ‘immortal’.

== Content ==
Jawedan is updated daily with news and op-eds on current affairs in politics and culture. It also is active on social media, mainly by sharing interesting and discussable video footages from popular news channels like Tolonews and 1TV. During elections, Jawedan conducts online surveys and interviews with political figures in the country.

Jawedan claims to be an independent and impartial news and analysis outlet. However, some writers consider it as a Tajik centered online paper.

== History ==
The online paper was founded in 2007 in the Netherlands. It publishes news, analysis and commentary in Persian and Pashtu.

Jawedan was hacked in April 2011. In April 2012, Jawedan was reaching an average of 3.5 million hits per month.
