= Ulduz =

Ulduz, Uldus, Yulduz, or Yuldus (Tatar: Юлдус, Юлдуз) is a Turkic female given name literally meaning "star". Notable people with the name include:

- Uldus Bakhtiozina (fl. 2011), Russian artist
- Yulduz Hashimi (born 2000), Afghan cyclist
- Yulduz Jumabayeva (born 1998), Turkmenistan weightlifter
- Yulduz Kuchkarova (born 1994), Uzbekistani swimmer
- Ulduz Rafili-Aliyeva (1922–2006), Soviet theater director
- Ulduz Sultanov (born 1974), is an Azerbaijani judoka
- Yulduz Turdiyeva (1985), Tajik-Persian singer
- Yulduz Usmonova (1963), Uzbek singer, song-writer, composer and actress

== See also ==
- Ildiz
- Yıldız
