= Salma Niazi =

Afghan journalist

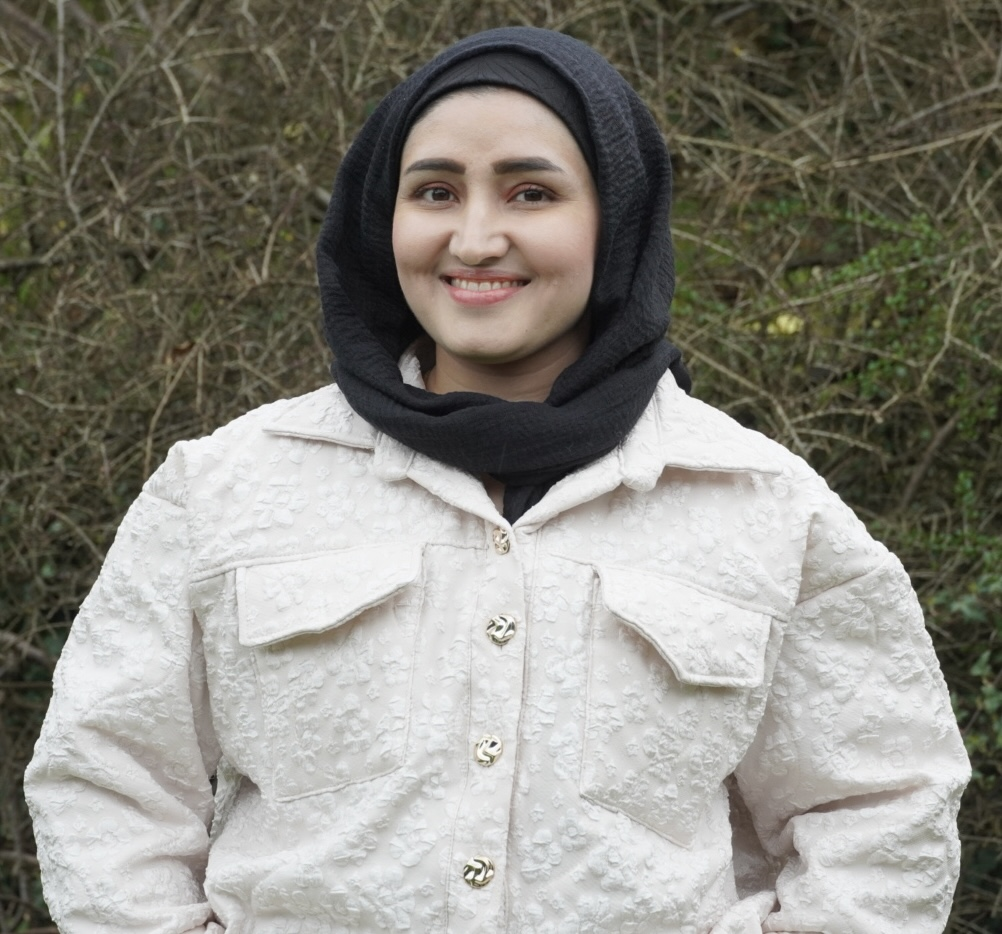
- Salma Niazi in 2026
- Born: April 21, 2001 (age 25); Laghman, Afghanistan
- Occupation: Journalist
- Spouse: Saeedullah Safi (m. 2022-present)
- Writing career
- Notable work: The Afghan Times

Salma Niazi (born 2001) is an Afghan journalist and the founder of The Afghan Times. Fleeing to Ireland in 2024 after the Taliban recaptured Afghanistan in 2021, she continues her journalistic endeavors in exile.

Niazi was born in a village in Laghman Province, Afghanistan. By the age of 16, she was the only female journalist in her province, advocating for women's representation in the media.

== Career ==
Niazi began her journalism career as a teenager. She worked in local radio, becoming a voice for Afghan women's rights. Her work included reporting on issues such as gender discrimination, education, and women's roles in society.

== The Afghan Times ==
In 2021, after the Taliban regained control of Afghanistan, Niazi fled first to Pakistan, and then to Ireland to escape increasing restrictions and threats against female journalists. Determined to continue her advocacy for women's rights, she founded The Afghan Times in August 2021. The online platform, run entirely by women, provides news in both Pashto and English.

Salma has maintained The Afghan Times, leading a team of journalists and photographers operating covertly within Afghanistan. By mentoring a network of youth reporters and staying connected to over 100 young women contributors nationwide, she continues to amplify voices from across the country.

== Awards ==
- "One Young World Journalist of the Year 2025" for positive social impact of her work
- Lyra McKee Award for Bravery for her work reporting on the rights of women in Afghanistan.
- 1st place “Young Reporters Writing” category at the International Sport Press Association’s (AIPS) 2025 Sport Media Awards
