= ARIA TV =

Aria TV
- Country: Afghanistan

Programming
- Picture format: 576i (SDTV 4:3)

History
- Launched: 4 April 2011

Links
- Website: www.aria.af

ARIA TV is a television channel in Afghanistan for children and teenagers. It was launched on 4 April 2011 as "an exclusive and dedicated channel for children and teenagers". The target audience includes pre-school children, school children and children not in school, from age 2 to 19.

ARIA TV aims to educate children and teenagers about their rights and to accomplish behavior change, focusing on the promotion of democracy in parallel with educational and cultural development. It uses education entertainment as a strategic approach for educating children and teenagers, through different types of programs such as animations, TV shows, soap operas, feature movies, documentaries and TV spots. A creative team with the support of Afghan educators will work on these programs.

The creative team of this channel has the background and experience to develop effective, inspiring and moving messages and programs. The educators collaborating with the creative team have many years of experience in the field of education and curriculum development.

ARIA TV has a preschool programming block, an evening block, ARIA at Night and a special programming block at the weekends.
