= Ayna TV =

Television station in Afghanistan

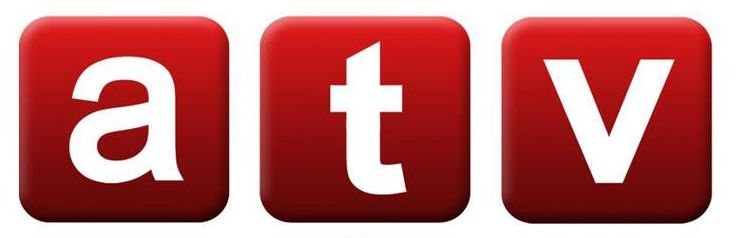
- Type: Satellite television network
- Country: Afghanistan

Programming
- Language(s): Uzbek, Turkmen

History
- Launched: 2004
- Closed: February 16, 2022

Availability

Terrestrial
- Analog channel 2 (VHF) in Kabul

Ayna Television (تلويزيون آينه, also romanized Aiena Television) was the first commercial television station broadcasting from Mazari Sharif, Afghanistan, starting in 2004. It closed in mid-February 2022. The name Ayna means "mirror" in Uzbek. It aired entertainment and news programs as well as serving as an improvement tool for Abdul Rashid Dostum and his party, Junbish-i-Milli Islami Afghanistan, and at one point was reportedly owned by him. Ayna was set up in order to satisfy the entertainment needs of people in northern Afghanistan where Uzbek is widely spoken, but after a few years also started broadcasting programmes in Dari Persian and Pashto languages.

The signal of Ayna could be received throughout the northern province of Jowzjan as well as in the neighbouring provinces of Balkh, Faryab, Sar-e-Pol, Badghis, Herat, Ghor, Samangan, Takhar, Kunduz, Badakhshan, Baghlan, Bamyan, and other provinces including the Greater Kabul region.

Sayed Fahim Zaffar, the person responsible for Ayna Television, said launching the channel cost about US$1 million. The station's location was in a house belonging to Abdul Rashid Dostum. The station planned as of 2016 to construct a new building meeting international broadcasting standards to house the television station.

In February 2022, it was reported that Ayna TV stopped broadcasting due to what it called "economic challenges". This occurred half a year after the Taliban takeover of the country.

== See also ==
- Watch Ayna TV Live Online
- List of television channels in Afghanistan
