= Kabul Weekly =

Periodical literature

- Type: Weekly newspaper
- Founded: 1991
- Ceased publication: 2011
- Language: English, Dari, Pashto
- Circulation: 10,000
- Website: website expired

The Kabul Weekly was the most widely distributed weekly newspaper in Afghanistan, both in the center and the provinces. It ceased publication in 2011, with the sudden announcement printed on the front page of the last issue. Quote from the last issue: "While this is a column, I wanted to share with readers on the front page my decision to close down the Kabul Weekly.", Faheem Dashty, 30. of January 2011.

It was first started in 1991, but was closed in 1994 after it published an article critical of the Mujahideen government. The newspaper restarted its circulation immediately after the fall of the Taliban and became the main newspaper read by the population of Afghanistan. The Kabul Weekly was published once a week on Wednesday in English, Dari (Persian) and Pashto. It had a circulation of 10,000. It ceased publication in 2011.
