= Ildiz =

Ildiz is a surname. Notable people with the surname include:

- Ahmed Ildız (born 1996), Austrian-Turkish footballer
- Muhammed Ildiz (born 1991), Austrian footballer
- Yücel İldiz (born 1953), Turkish football manager

== See also ==
- Yıldız (disambiguation)
- Ulduz
