= Yıldız =

Yıldız (Turkish for 'star') may refer to:

== Places in Turkey ==
- Yıldız, Diyadin, a village in Diyadin district, Ağrı Province
- Yıldız, Beypazarı, a village in Ankara Province
- Yıldız, Susurluk, a village in Balıkesir Province
- Yıldız, Bartın, a village in Bartın Province
- Yıldız, Adilcevaz, a village in Adilcevaz district, Bitlis Province
- Yıldız, Beşiktaş, a neighborhood in Istanbul
- Yıldız Mountains or Strandzha, a mountain massif between Bulgaria and Turkey

== Other uses ==
- Yıldız Palace, a palace in Istanbul
- Yıldız Park, an urban park in Istanbul
- Yıldız Clock Tower, a clock tower in Istanbul
- Yıldız Technical University, a school in Istanbul
- Yıldız Holding, a Turkish manufacturer of food products
- Yyldyz Hotel, a hotel in Ashgabat, Turkmenistan
- Yıldız, a kilim motif
- Yıldız, a Crimean Tatar magazine.

== People with the name ==
=== Given name ===
- Yildiz Akdogan (born 1973), Turkish-born Danish politician
- Yıldız İbrahimova (born 1952), Turkish singer
- Yıldız Kaplan (born 1970), Turkish actress, fashion model and pop singer
- Yıldız Kenter (1928–2019), Turkish actress and lecturer
- Yıldız Tilbe (born 1966), Turkish singer

=== Surname ===
- Ahmet Yıldız (born 1979), Turkish scientist
- Betül Cemre Yıldız (born 1989), Turkish chess player and grand master
- Bilge Yildiz, Turkish nuclear engineer
- Dilşat Yıldız (born 1996), Turkish curler
- Esra Yıldız (born 1997), Turkish boxer
- Halime Yıldız (born 1980), Turkish female para badminton player
- Kenan Yıldız (born 2005), Turkish footballer
- Mehmet Yıldız (footballer) (born 1981), Turkish footballer
- Özlem Yıldız (born 2003), Turkish female judoka
- Rıfat Yıldız (born 1965), German wrestler of Turkish origin
- Salih Yıldız (born 2001), Turkish judoka
- Seda Yıldız (born 1998), Turkish Paralympian goalball player
- Taner Yıldız (born 1962), Turkish politician
- Taner Yıldız (born 1992), Turkish footballer
- Uğur Kaan Yıldız (born 2002), Turkish footballer
- Yakup Yıldız (born 2003), Turkish archer
- Yaser Yıldız (born 1988), Turkish footballer

== See also ==
- Ildiz
- Ulduz (disambiguation)
