= Hewad TV =

Media group

Hewad Media Group, Hewad TV
- Type: Satellite Television Network
- Country: Afghanistan
- Availability: Afghanistan
- Owner: Qayoum Khan Karzaii

Hewad is an independent media group consisting of an international TV network, radio stations, and production facilities, founded by Qayoom Karzai in 2006 in Kandahar. Originally established as a local TV network, Hewad quickly gained popularity among viewers due to its initial broadcasts. In 2015, it expanded into satellite television and radio broadcasting. Today, Hewad holds satellite status and broadcasts programs across Afghanistan and 43 other Asian countries.

Hewad TV offers a diverse range of programming including news bulletins, social and political shows, and Pashto-dubbed movies. It ranks highly in transmission quality in Kandahar and throughout Afghanistan, serving Afghan audiences such as refugees in neighboring nations as well.

== Broadcasting programs ==
Hewad Radio and TV operate a blend of public service-oriented programming (cultural, political, economic, developmental and educational programs including VOX POP, Peoples' comments), news "News Bulletin each hour and Three News Hours Daily", entertainment and music.

== Team structure ==
The structure of Hewad Radio and TV staff (reporters and producers) structure is designed based on the following fundamental rules.

· Hewad Radio and TV managers, reporters and producers must have Afghan nationality.

· The staff members must have a BA Degree in Journalism or at least two years of experience in the relevant field.

· Hewad Radio and TV staff (male and female) should be fluent in speaking and writing the two official languages (Pashto and Dari) fluently.

== Hewad Radio (88 FM) ==
Hewad Radio is the first independent radio channel in the southern region, which was established 13 years ago under the name of "Aghan Azada Radio" in Kandahar province.

The radio is now a part of Hewad Group.

== Hewad Production ==
Hewad production is another significant part of Hewad Group which was set up after employing experienced male and female staff in 2014.

Besides providing various video broadcasting programs and debates for Hewad TV, Hewad Production standardly carries on the responsibilities of dubbing the Hollywood and Bollywood movies, creating commercial ads by using the latest graphics programs, recording and editing the conferences, meetings, gatherings, presentations and workshops held by public authorities and private sectors and help Hewad Radio in case of audio services.

== Hewad Radio Television Coverage ==
Hewad TV Satellite Coverage: Yahsat ۱A is located at 52.5° east covering the Middle East, North Africa, Southwest Asia and Europe

Hewad TV Local Coverage: 2KW Transmitter with 40m tower for local broadcast in Kandahar province

Hewad Radio Coverage: 1 KW Transmitter with 36m tower for local broadcast in Kandahar province along with online web broadcast: hewadradio.myl2mr.com
