= Lemar (TV channel) =

Television station in Kabul

Lemar لمر
- Country: Afghanistan

Programming
- Language: Pashto
- Picture format: HDTV
- Timeshift service: TOLO TV; TOLOnews

Ownership
- Owner: MOBY Group

History
- Launched: 2006; 20 years ago

Links
- Website: www.lemar.tv/en

Availability

Terrestrial
- Normal antenna: 40 UHF (Kabul); 41 UHF (Kandahar); 39 UHF (Herat); 29 UHF (Mazar-i-Sharif); 34 UHF (Kunduz); 43 UHF (Jalalabad); 33 UHF (Taloqan); 41 UHF (Puli Khumri); 27 UHF (Ghazni); 35 UHF (Khost)

Lemar (Pashto: لمر; lit. 'sun') is a television station based in Kabul, Afghanistan, which was launched on August 15, 2006. It is owned by MOBY Group. The channel broadcasts news and entertainment programs in the Pashto language. Its sister channels are TOLO TV and TOLOnews.

Lemar TV is one of the most popular Pashto channels and the 4th most popular channel in Afghanistan. All content is produced locally or acquired globally and transmitted in Pashto. It is a mix of entertainment, news and current affairs are widely respected for their apolitical tenor and resonance with Pashto-speaking audiences.

== Programs ==
Lemar TV play Hindi serials dubbed in Pashto such as Laagi Tujhse Lagan. This channel is the second-most watched Pashto channel in Afghanistan, after Shamshad TV which is the main transmission carrier Pashto channel along with Khyber TV. There is also another show called kangina. It's also a very famous afghan show.

=== Food Path ===
Food Path is a famous food show in Afghanistan which aired every Friday on Lemar TV. The show had two hosts, Kiran Khan from Pakistan and Najeeba Faiz from Afghanistan.

=== Lemar Makham ===
Is a social and entrainment program airing on Lemar TV.

=== Tawdi Khabari ===
Is a current affairs program airing on Tolonews and Lemar TV.

=== Kaglechoona ===
Kaglechoona is a current affairs program hosted by Mujeeb Muneeb and produced by Merwais Hamidi. Kaglechoona aired every Tuesday on Lemar TV and every Saturdays on TOLOnews.

=== Cricket ===
Cricket is quickly becoming popular in Afghanistan. The 2010 ICC World Twenty20 was shown for the first time in Afghanistan in the local languages of Pashto and Persian. This also opened its doors for showing other Cricket tournaments like Cricket World Cup, ICC Champions Trophy, Indian Premier League, Pakistan Super League, Bangladesh Premier League, Lanka Premier League, Men’s T20 World Cup etc.

== See also ==
- Television in Afghanistan
