= Afghanistan National Television =

Afghan state owned television broadcaster

RTA ملی
- Country: Afghanistan
- Broadcast area: Afghanistan; Europe; North America; Asia
- Headquarters: Kabul

Programming
- Picture format: 720p HDTV

Ownership
- Owner: Radio Television Afghanistan
- Sister channels: RTA Sport; RTA News; RTA Education

History
- Launched: 19 August 1978 (original); 18 November 2001 (relaunch)
- Closed: 8 July 1998 (original)

Links
- Webcast: rta.af/broadcasts
- Website: rta.af

Availability

Terrestrial
- Oqaab: Channel 3

Afghanistan National Television (Dari: تلویزیون ملی Televizion-e Milli-ye Afghanistan, Pashto: ملی تلویزیون Da Afghanistan Milli Televizion) is the state-owned television channel in Afghanistan. It is part of the Radio Television Afghanistan (RTA) public broadcaster.

== History ==
Construction work started in March 1977 and the first experimental broadcasts started in March 1978. Afghan television was launched on 19 August 1978, Afghan Independence Day, in a ceremony headed by Nur Muhammad Taraki. Since the beginning its broadcasts were in colour using PAL system.

In 1983 three new stations were commissioned in Kandahar (see RTA Kandahar), Jalalabad and Herat (see RTA Herat). On 2 January 1985 the broadcasts started in Jalalabad while a new station in Badakhshan Province finished its construction. On 3 February 1985 a new station opened in Ghazni, while in the same month broadcasts started in Kandahar and Herat. Female presenters were temporarily banned in 1992. They were allowed again in April 1993, though under the condition that they had to wear black veils.

During the Taliban regime, Afghanistan National Television ceased operations when television was banned, and on 8 July 1998 they ordered the destruction of all TV sets. During this period, only a station in Badakhshan controlled by the Northern Alliance was allowed to operate, because it was outside of the areas claimed by the Taliban.

After the Taliban were overthrown, television in Afghanistan restarted at 6pm on 18 November 2001, with Miriam Shakebar being the first face seen. The return was marked with a three-hour live broadcast in Pashto and Dari languages, as well as a reading of the Quran, music videos, cartoons, news and interviews. The Kabul station still operated on equipment dating back to the early 70s while its transmitter had a 10-watt reach and didn't cover the whole of Kabul, meaning that the city center was deprived of seeing its return. The station carried movies - they still had a catalog of over 3,000 titles seized from the Taliban, mostly dubbed into Dari. Not all of its video archive survived intact, as two years earlier, 400 tapes (out of a total of 9,000) were destroyed because they countered Islamic values.

In 2018, Popular Afghan television channel that delivers a wide range of entertainment and cultural, informational content.

In 2019, RTA launched a sister channel to the main station called RTA Sport, which is dedicated to sports content.

=== Exclusive 2008 speech ===
Afghanistan National TV logo from 2002

Logo until 2006

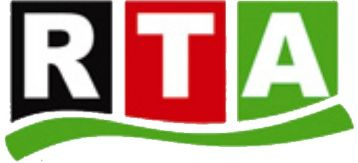
The channel (and organisation) logo until 12 March 2010, it initially appeared on-screen in a white variant

Logo until late 2021; it was initially shown in a white variant before permanently gaining the colors

RTA became famous worldwide when Afghan President Hamid Karzai made a live speech to the world minutes after dozens of insurgents attempted to assassinate him at a military parade, which was thwarted by the Afghan National Army. The scene of the attempt was also broadcast live to RTA viewers in Afghanistan and picked up by the international media.

== International availability ==
Afghanistan National Television became available in Europe, Middle East, North Africa, Africa, Asia Pacific, and North America on 5 January 2008. The channel's broadcasting hours were 06:00 to 00:00 (local Afghan time), corresponding to 01:30 to 19:30 UTC; later that year it started broadcasting 24 hours. As of 2018, it is no longer broadcast on the Hot Bird satellite in Europe.

Currently the channel broadcasts on the TürkmenÄlem 52°E / MonacoSAT satellite to viewers in and around Afghanistan and in Europe, and western Asia. It also broadcasts on GSAT-19 for viewers in the Indian subcontinent.

== See also ==
- Television in Afghanistan
