= Zahra Joya =

Afghan Hazara journalist and feminist

Zahra Joya (Dari/Hazaragi: زهرا جویا) is an ethnic Hazara journalist from Afghanistan. She is the founder of Rukhshana Media, an outlet in Dari and English which she runs from exile.

== Early life ==
Zahra Joya was born to a Hazara family in a small village in Bamyan Province in 1992. She was 5 years old when the Taliban seized power in Afghanistan. From 1996 to 2001, they banned almost all education for girls. Joya would dress as a boy and call herself Mohammed, and walked alongside her young uncle for two hours each day to get to school. In an interview with Angelina Jolie for TIME in 2022, she claimed that some men in her family, including her father, believed in women's rights. After the United States and its allies invaded Afghanistan and toppled the Taliban government in 2001, she was able to drop the disguise and enroll in law school in Kabul, planning on following her father's footsteps as a prosecutor. Moved by the untold stories of her female classmates, she decided to become a journalist, despite the dangers and difficulties of being a female reporter in Afghanistan.

== Career ==
Joya worked as the deputy director of communications at the Kabul municipal government. At times, she was the only female amongst her colleagues. When she remarked this, she was told that women wouldn't have good capacity or skills needed for the job.

In December 2020, she founded Rukhshana Media, the country's first feminist news agency. She had been motivated to do so after a friend's suggestion, and due to the responses of her male colleagues regarding the lack of female journalists. The outlet was named Rukhshana to honor a 19-year-old girl who was stoned to death by the Taliban in 2015 in Ghor Province. The girl was sentenced to death for having eloped with a lover after her family had arranged a marriage for her. Joya's aim was to bring light to the reality of life for Afghan women with stories published and reported on by local female journalists, covering issues like rape and forced marriage. She established Rukhshana Media with her own savings but had to launch an online fundraiser to keep operations running. She was critical of the Taliban and reported on their crackdown on female public servants in the months before the US and its allies withdrew their troops. A few days before the country fell to the Taliban, she collaborated with The Guardian to publish the Women Report Afghanistan project, reporting on the Taliban takeover. Joya and her colleagues received a number of threats for their journalism.

Due to her reporting and because of the Taliban's longtime persecution of Hazaras, Joya was a target of the Taliban. Fearing for her life, she decided to flee the country. She received an evacuation notice from the British government and was eventually airlifted to London. She continues to run Rukhshana Media in exile, and remains in contact with her team who send her reports from Afghanistan in secret. Most female Afghan journalists were forced to leave their jobs after the takeover.

== Awards and recognition ==
Joya was one of 12 women named Time's Women of the Year in 2022. She was recognized for her journalism, and was interviewed by Angelina Jolie.

Joya received the 2022 Change maker Award from the Bill & Melinda Gates Foundation on September 20, 2022. She was honored as one of the BBC 100 Women in December 2022.

Rukhshana Media received the Marie Colvin Award at the British Journalism Awards 2021.
