= Hafiz Sahar =

Afghan-American scholar and academic (1828–1982)

- Born: 1928; Laghman, Afghanistan
- Died: 1982 (aged 53–54); Minnesota, United States
- Education: New York University (PhD, 1964-67); Northwestern University (1959-1961); Kabul University (1950-1955); Habibia High School (1949)
- Occupations: Professor of Journalism, mass communications, Author, Chief Editor of daily Newspaper
- Spouse: Tahera Sahar
- Children: 6
- Website: Memorial Website

Hafiz Sahar (Persian: حفيظ‌‌ سحر) (1928–1982) was an academic scholar, educator, author, Fulbright Scholar, and Professor of Journalism in both Afghanistan and United States Universities. He was Editor-in-Chief of Eslah national newspaper of Afghanistan (1955–1958, 1969–1971), Director of Broadcasting Radio Afghanistan, General Director of International Relations and Faculty of Department of Communications and Journalism and Department of Law in Kabul University. He was a champion of free speech/press and human rights as well as a strong advocate of bringing Television in Afghanistan.

== Biography ==
=== Early life ===
Sahar was born in Laghman Province in the village of Diwa as the oldest son of Mirza Ghulam Mohamed Khan, a member of the Kakar tribe and a Provincial treasurer for the King, and Bibi Sheeba, a homemaker. His interest in literary work prompted him to translate Aesop's Fables to Dari (Persian) (Luqman e Hakim), while in highschool.

=== Education ===
He graduated from Habibia high school as class Valedictorian in 1949 and completed his degree in political sciences from Kabul University with first rank. He completed his master's degree at Northwestern University and his doctorate degree as a Fulbright Scholar from New York University in 1967 with Founders Day Award. He could read, write and speak Persian, Pashtu, English, Urdu and Arabic, as well as able to speak dialects of Pahay, Sheghni and Baluchi.

=== Career ===
Upon graduating from Kabul University, Sahar worked in communication department of the Ministry of Culture and Information and in the Daily Eslah newspaper as the chief of the editorial board. He was invited by U.S. Department of State in 1959 as a leading citizen of Afghanistan to promote understanding between Afghanistan and United States. He continued his higher education at Northwestern University school of speech to obtain his master's degree and to New York University Department of Communications to complete his doctorate degree. His thesis was an analysis of how Television can be used as an education tool in Afghanistan. He introduced educational television, for the first time, at Kabul University in 1973.

He was head of the high ranking delegation for establishing communication between Afghanistan and Czechoslovakia, was Vice President of Radio Afghanistan and General Director for International Cultural Communication. He held faculty position as Professor at Wayne State University in the department of speech and drama, starting courses on Mass Media and Society there. He also, simultaneously, taught at the Kabul University. In 1971, Sahar, was appointed as the Mass Media advisor reporting directly to the King. Due to health problems, he had to return to United States for advanced medical care.

== Philosophical and/or political views ==
As Professor of Journalism and Mass Communications, he was a champion of free speech, press, and human rights, as well as a strong advocate of bringing television in Afghanistan.

== Published works ==
- "Comparative study of educational television in selected developing countries and its relevance to the similar use of television in Afghanistan" Hafiz Sahar, New York University, 1967.
- "The nearly lost art of letters" an article explaining the significant of letter writing as an art. Insight News, Minneapolis, 1978.
- "Recent Coup Analyzed: Afghanistan is no cliche", a commentary report on Afghanistan Coup, Insight News, 17 May 1978.
- "Canada encourages and supports ethnic diversity" an article on Canadian cultural activities, Insight News, 23 August 1978.
- "The Mawkish Melthing Pot: Cultural uniformity vs cultural diversity" Insight News, Sept 20, 1978.
- "Chicano looks for future for more freedom" Insight News, 13 July 1978.
- Aesop's Fables in Persian/Dari, Kabul, Afghanistan 1971.
- "Lapiz Lazulai Cufflinks – Sherlock Holmes", March 1971.
- "The United Nations Organization: The Human Rights, 1949".
- Our representatives for the Parliament seem to be the cream of the crop, thanks to Democracy", Daily Anis, 1950.
- "The Christian era", Daily Eslah, 1952, Kabul Afghanistan, Published on New Year's Eve, encouraging the leaders of the World to be more attentive to bring peace on earth
- "United Nations", an article about the problems facing the UN in Daily Eslah, Kabul, Afghanistan, 1952.
- "Our representatives for the Parliament", an article about the consequence of Afghanistan's parliamentary election in 1954.
- "Neutrality as our traditional Policy", an article defining and clarifying neutrality as the best policy for Afghanistan, Daily Anis, Kabul Afghanistan
- "A friendly suggestion to the great nation of Iran", an article advising the Iranian Authorities of the time to use their best judgement about Mosaddegh, the Prime Minister who was put on trial by the King. The article emphasized the point that destroying a man like Mosaddegh may not seem difficult, but surely to find a replacement for such a master was something that the Iranians couldn't afford. Pamir Newspaper, Kabul Afghanistan.
- "Humanity on the border of destruction" an article published in Daily Eslah, 1962.
- "The red Crescent's relationship to International Red Cross and its humanistic aspirations", Insight News, Minneapolis, MN.
- "From failure to success: A philosophical argument against absolutism", Daily Eslah 1971

== Honours, decorations, awards and distinctions ==
- Fulbright Scholar
- Fellowship from the Asia Foundation of the US – Northwestern University
- Founder's Day Award from New York University
- Invited by the United States (Department of State) as a distinguished citizen of Afghanistan and a leading newspaper editor (1959)
- Elected representative of Kabul University to the parliament of Afghanistan
- Elected president of educational meeting and conferences for educational institutions of Afghanistan
- Class Valedictorian of Habibia Highschool
- First prize in writing in a nationwide contest of writers and editors in Afghanistan
- Acclamation and acknowledgement for exceptional abilities by the Ministry of Education of Afghanistan
- A scholarship is named after him at University of California, Davis
