= Sharq (TV channel) =

Afghan Pashto language television station

Sharq Radio TV
- Type: Satellite television network
- Country: Afghanistan
- Headquarters: Jalalabad, Afghanistan
- Broadcast area: Afghanistan, Asia, Europe
- Owner: Shaiq Network
- Key people: Shafiqullah Shaiq (founder & CEO)
- Launch date: 2008
- Picture format: 576i
- Official website: www.shaiqnetwork.com

Sharq Television or Sharq TV (Pashto: شرق) is an Afghan Pashto language private television station based in Jalalabad, Afghanistan, owned by Shaiq Network and its founder Shafiqullah Shaiq.

There was no private TV channel at the time in the east region, after the operation of the Radio Sharq for five years, Sharq TV was the first TV channel that launched in mid-2008. The channel broadcasts 24 hours a day, providing educational, news, shows, dramas, and entertainment programs to the eastern region of Afghanistan. Sharq TV programs are mainly (90%) in the Pashto language. It transmits hourly news, current affairs programs, entertainment programs, politics programs, sports programs, and criminal incidents programs. Sharq has been attacked five times since its operation from grenade attacks to rocket launchers, the attackers were killed in the last attack caused by a mine displaced incorrectly in the headquarters of the channel. The Channel started broadcasting its services through TürkmenÄlem 52°E / MonacoSAT Satellite on 7 March 2020 with the Following Frequency 10845, SR: 27500, POL: V 52.5. Sharq TV also provides an online stream of its Channel 24/7.

The Channel is part of Shaiq Network, which also owns Sharq Radio 91.3 FM Nargis Family Radio 92.4 FM and Heela Organization.

== See also ==
- List of television channels in Afghanistan
