= Jahid Mohseni =

Bangladeshi artist (born 1971)

- Born: January 25, 1971 (age 55); Kabul
- Occupations: CEO, Moby Media Group
- Website: www.mobygroup.com

Jahid Mohseni (born January 25, 1971), along with his brothers Saad and Zaid Mohseni and his sister Wajma Mohseni, established MOBY Group, Afghanistan's most diverse media company with interests in television, radio, print, web and directories, IT&T, and retail. Jahid is CEO of Moby Group and has led the creation and development of Moby Media.

Prior to Moby, Jahid headed Afghan Government's Afghan Aid Co-ordination Authority (AACA) responsible for coordinating donor assistance to Afghanistan.
