= BaanoTV =

Afghan television channel

Baano TV (Women TV) تلویزیون بانو
- Country: Afghanistan
- Network: Baano Media Group

Programming
- Picture format: 1080p (HDTV) & 576i (SDTV), 16:9)

Ownership
- Owner: Baano Media Group

History
- Launched: July 2017

Links
- Website: www.baano.tv

Baano TV (Persian: تلویزیون بانو transl. Women's Television) was a commercial television station operated by Baano Media Group in Afghanistan. Launched in July 2017, it became one of the first terrestrial TV stations in the country dedicated to women.

Baano TV was available in the Kabul, Parwan, Kapisa, Logar and Maidan Wardak provinces of Afghanistan, and started its transmission in Mazar-e-Sharif in August 2018.

In September 2018, the channel also started their transmission on Al Yah Satellite Communications.

The Baano Media Group also operates an FM radio station for women under the name of Baano FM (Women FM).
