= Yulduz (newspaper) =

Weekly Uzbek language newspaper published in Afghanistan

- Founded: 1980; 46 years ago
- Language: Arabic script
- Country: Afghanistan

Yulduz ('Star') was a weekly Uzbek language newspaper published in Afghanistan. Yulduz was published in Arabic script. The newspaper first appeared around 1980.
