= Arman FM =

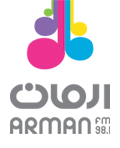
- Afghanistan

Ownership
- Owner: Moby Media Group

History
- First air date: 16 April 2003

Links
- Website: arman.fm

ARMAN FM is one of several privately owned radio stations in Afghanistan. It broadcasts general entertainment shows in both of Afghanistan's official languages, Dari and Pashto. The station is also available on live stream on Arman FM's website.

== History ==
Arman FM takes its name from Arman (given name) and changed the Afghanistan's media landscape since launch early 2003. It became the country's first commercial radio station.

The station's attention boomed with its audiences' love to music and enthusiasm for change. Arman FM's programs were very diverse bringing to listeners the latest music from Afghanistan and around the world. The shows have been presented by some of the hottest and young RJs in the country including men and women. A format that was essential when the station launched with a style that is being replicated across competitive and governmental stations. Its entertainment-focused programs indicate the young global trends, featuring local, regional and international music. Chatting and engaging with the listeners and presenting the latest news, are also part of Arman FM's focus.

Radio has always been the most popular form of media in Afghanistan. Arman FM suspended its programs after the Taliban takeover on 15 August 2021 and started relaying Ariana News audio. It was back on air on 16 November, but following the Taliban's ban on music, musical programs were discontinued, entertainment programs reduced, western pop songs removed, and religious content was expanded.

== Schedule (before August 15, 2021) ==
Shows	Presenter	Timing	Days
Safay Saher	Massood Sanjer & Homayon Danishyar	07:00 am	Sat-Wed
Subhe Arman	Sima Safa	08:00 am	Sat-Wed
Masti	Ajmal Noorzai	09:00 am	Sat-Wed
Nano Namak	Laila	12:00 pm	Sat-Wed
Arman Farmaish	Yalda Bahar	1:00 pm	Sat-Wed
Drive	Hussna Azizy	03:00 pm	Sat-Wed
Josh	Samim Rahnaward, Siar Matin	04:00 pm	Sat-Wed
Shame Arman	Laila	06:00 pm	Sat-Wed
Shabe Ashiqan	Hadia Hamdard & Masih	09:00 pm	Wednesday
Weekend	Hussna Azizy	08:00 am	Thursday
Darman	Hadia Hamdard	11:00 am	Thursday
Sound Central	Cliff Tlender	01:00 pm	Thursday
MP4	Samim Rahnaward & Yalda Bahar	02:00 pm	Thursday
Meela	Narwan Amiry & Dubbing Artist	08:00 am	Friday
Hits Forever	Yalda Bahar	06:00 pm	Friday
Top 40	Yalda Bahar	02:00 pm	Friday
Top 40	Hussain Ali Saidi	2:00 am	Saturday

RJs
Ajmal Noorzai
Hadia Hamdard
Hamayon Danishyar
Hussna Azizy
Massood Sanjer
Samim Rahnaward
Siar Matin
Sima Safa
Yalda Bahar
Laila

== See also ==
- List of radio stations in Afghanistan
