= Daily Afghanistan =

English-language newspaper of Afghanistan

- Type: Daily newspaper
- Format: broadsheet
- Publisher: Afghanistan Group of Newspapers
- Founded: 2006
- Language: Dari
- Headquarters: Kabul
- Circulation: 4800 daily
- Price: 10 Afs
- Website: www.dailyafghanistan.com

The Daily Afghanistan is one of the most popular of newspapers in Afghanistan. It covers national and international news with circulation of 4800. It is published by Afghanistan Group of Newspapers, an independent media group which also publishes The Daily Outlook Afghanistan, the largest English paper in Afghanistan.

== Media in Afghanistan ==
Media was a new phenomenon in the years when the Taliban was ousted from power (2001–2021). But due to poor literacy and less culture of reading in Afghanistan, print-media is limited to urban areas. Radio is the only media source for the majority rural population in far-flung areas of the country.

== Circulation ==
Daily Afghanistan mostly goes to embassies, non-governmental organizations (NGOs), United Nations agencies, public places, educational institutions and other organizations. Both papers go to most provinces. A limited number of copies also go to Pakistan and Dubai. Many independent newspapers are emerging in Afghanistan. It was founded on 26 February 2004 by Dr. Hussain Ali Yasa.

== Free and independent media ==
In Afghanistan, print media is political. Many daily newspapers are attached to and support political parties. The government publishes six newspapers. Daily Afghanistan is independent paper in Dari/Pashto. Due to its large national circulation, the Daily Afghanistan receives extensive business advertisements.
