= Zaid Mohseni =

Afghan businessman (born 1969)

- Born: July 1, 1969 (age 56); Kabul
- Occupations: Director, Moby Media Group
- Website: www.mobygroup.com

Zaid Mohseni (born July 1, 1969), along with his brothers Saad and Jahid Mohseni and his sister Wajma Mohseni, established the Moby Group, a media company based in Afghanistan with interests in television, radio, print, web and directories, IT&T, and retail. Zaid is Director of Moby's technical and legal divisions.

Zaid’s leadership of the technology division of the Moby Group has been the key to successful utilization of modern technology for Afghan needs. Zaid is also a lawyer and former Partner and Head of the Commercial Department of the Melbourne-based law firm, Wilmoth Field Warne. He has substantial experience in corporate and commercial law and legal drafting. He is also the Managing Partner of the Afghanistan-based law firm, Zamoh Lawyers, servicing corporate and government clients in commercial and litigious matters.
