= Zhvandūn =

Afghan magazine

- Cover of Zhvandūn from February 3, 1973
- Categories: culture, current affairs
- Frequency: every 15 days until 1952, then weekly
- First issue: May 1949
- Final issue: 1996
- Country: Afghanistan
- Based in: Kabul
- Language: Pashto, Persian

Zhvandūn (ژوندون, Life in Pashto) was a popular 20th century Afghan cultural and current affairs magazine published from 1949 to 1996.

== History ==
The magazine was founded in May 1949 and was published in both Persian and Pashto. The content of the magazine changed according to the political environment. In the 1960s and 70s, advertisements for consumer goods like tape recorders and fridges started becoming prevalent. The writers and readership were urban elites, mainly in Kabul. In the 1980s, under a leftist government, revolutionary and agricultural themes replaced consumerist ones and Soviet film stars replaced those from Hollywood. It ended its run in 1996 during the Mujahideen government.
