= Bakhtar News Agency =

State news agency of the Afghan government

- Type: Daily newspaper
- Founded: 1939
- Headquarters: Kabul, Afghanistan
- Products: News reporting (Pashto, English, Dari, Arabic, Russian, Urdu, Uzbek)
- Owners: Government of Afghanistan
- Website: bakhtarnews.af

Bakhtar News Agency (BNA; Pashto: د باختر خبري اژانس Dari: آژانس خبری باختر) is the official state news agency of the Afghan government, based in Kabul. The agency is a major source of news for all media in Afghanistan, gathering domestic and international news and providing information to outlets. The agency provides news in the following languages: Pashto, English, Dari, Arabic, Russian, Urdu, Uzbek.

Established in 1939 by the Government Press Department of Afghanistan, it monitors foreign and domestic news before distribution. The English sector of the news distribution was not added until 1992, when it was launched in order to keep foreign diplomats informed of Afghan news. The Ministry of Culture and Information monitors the reporting of Bakhtar News Agency.

In 2002, Agence France-Presse established a satellite link providing news information to the Bakhtar News Agency. The government had planned to make the agency independent of government control in 2004 before elections.

== See also ==
- Mass media in Afghanistan
