= Radio Television Afghanistan =

Public broadcaster of Afghanistan

Radio Television Afghanistan ملی
- Type: Broadcast radio, television and online
- Country: Afghanistan
- Availability: National; International
- Founded: 1925; 101 years ago by Amanullah Khan
- Owner: Government of Afghanistan
- Key people: Yousef Ahmadi (Director General)
- Webcast: https://www.rta.live/
- Official website: https://rta.af/

National Radio Television Afghanistan (RTA; Pashto: د افغانستان ملي راډيو تلويزیون, romanized: Dǝ Afġānistān Millī Rādīo Televizion; Dari: رادیو تلویزیون ملی افغانستان, romanized: Rādīo Televizion-e Millī-ye Afġānistān, branded as Millī (Pashto: ملی, romanized: millī, lit. 'national') is the public broadcasting organization of Afghanistan, based in Kabul. This government agency has a national television station (Afghanistan National Television), a radio station (Radio Afghanistan), and news media. As of 16 August 2023, Yousef Ahmadi is serving as the acting Director General of RTA. His predecessor was Atiqullah Azizi, who held the position since September 2021.

== History ==
Radio Afghanistan started with Radio Kabul in 1925 (1304 by the Afghan calendar), during the era of King Amanullah Khan. Two radio transmitters with the capacity of 400 watts were procured from the German company Telefunken, one of those has been installed on Koti Londoni near the bridge of Artel which subsequently started its operation and the second one had been transferred to Kandahar which on that period the musical programs and news were only being broadcast for few hours.

Television broadcasting facilities and studios were constructed in 1976 with grant aid from Japan, and the television broadcasts started on 19 August 1978. Since the beginning its broadcasts were in colour using PAL system.

Starting in 2002, the government started planning and attempting to reform RTA into a public service broadcaster. However this never came to fruition due to disagreements about the reform between president Hamid Karzai and other cabinet figures, despite the passing of several media laws. Eventually in April 2014, RTA was re-designated as an 'independent directorate', effectively meaning that the Ministry of Information no longer has direct control of the organization. Karzai's successor Ashraf Ghani also voiced his vision for RTA to become independent from the government.

Following the fall of the Taliban in 2002, RTA established an all-women news team, including Torpekai Amarkhel.

== Structure ==
Radio Television Afghanistan has regional sub-stations for all provinces of Afghanistan which operate radio services, and in some provinces, basic television at a provincial level. They broadcast material produced at a provincial level, interspersed with news bulletins distributed by the Kabul-based news desk. These stations are usually closely affiliated with the provincial governors' offices. Broadcast content includes high volumes of government messaging.

== Gallery ==
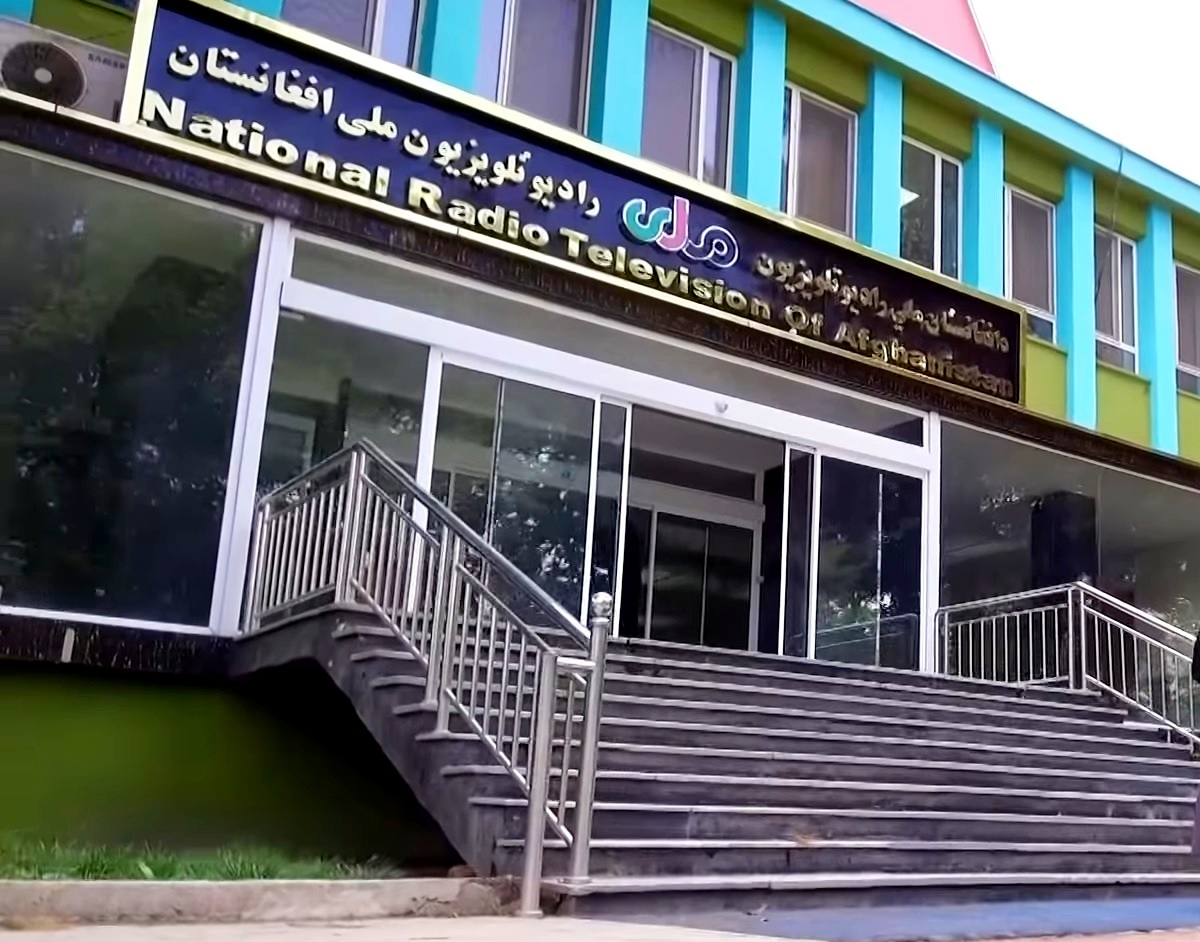
The RTA building on 10th Street, Wazir Akbar Khan, Kabul

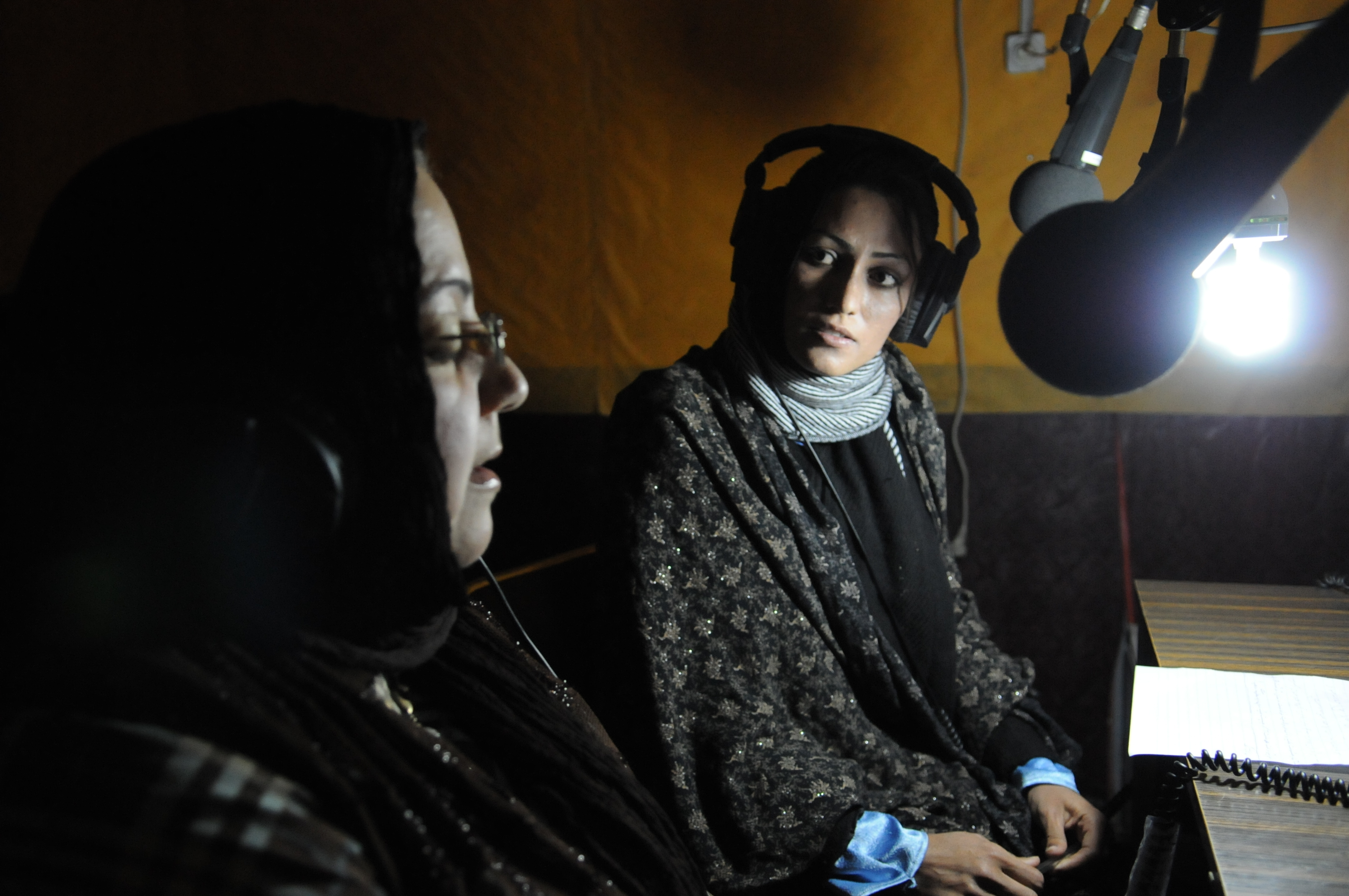
A live regional radio broadcast in Farah in 2013

== See also ==
- Bakhtar News Agency
- Mass media in Afghanistan
- Afghanistan and copyright issues
