= TOLO (TV channel) =

Commercial television station in Afghanistan

TOLO طلوع
- Country: Afghanistan

Programming
- Language: Dari Persian
- Picture format: 1080p (HDTV) & 576i (SDTV), 16:9)

Ownership
- Owner: MOBY Group
- Sister channels: TOLOnews, Lemar TV, Barbud Music, Arman FM and Tolo Music (Web)

History
- Launched: November 2004; 22 years ago

Links
- Website: www.tolo.tv www.darya.net

Availability

Terrestrial
- Normal antenna: 42 UHF (Kabul); 43 UHF (Kandahar); 37 UHF (Herat); 31 UHF (Mazar-i-Sharif); 32 UHF (Kunduz); 41 UHF (Jalalabad); 41 UHF (Taloqan); 43 UHF (Puli Khumri); 29 UHF (Ghazni); 31 UHF (Khost)

Streaming media
- Darya: www.darya.net (Afghanistan)

TOLO (Persian: طلوع, lit. 'sunrise') is a commercial television station operated by MOBY Group in Afghanistan. Launched in 2004, it became one of the first commercial stations in the country and laid the foundation for an accessible media outlet by offering a large library of shows. It is one of the most popular television channels in Afghanistan and broadcasts shows in both Dari-Persian and Pashto.

== History ==
The station was launched in Kabul in 2004, and by November 2007 it was broadcasting in 14 cities in Afghanistan on free-to-air and throughout the region by terrestrial antenna and by satellite. Its sister channels are TOLOnews, on air all day, and Lemar TV, in the Pashto language.

TOLO was the subject of documentary film in 2012 called The Network, by Eva Orner. The film saw limited international release in 2013.

On 21 January 2016, a Taliban suicide car bomber detonated explosives near a bus carrying staffers from TOLO in Darulaman Road in Kabul, killing at least 7 staff members, including 3 female employees and wounding 26 others. The attack drew widespread global condemnation, with various world countries, activists and media organizations denouncing it as an attack on Afghanistan's freedom of press.

During and following the 2021 Taliban takeover of Afghanistan, around 150 TOLO staff fled the country. Since the Taliban takeover of Afghanistan on 15 August 2021, Tolo TV drastically reduced entertainment programs and increased religious programs, especially since the Taliban banned music in mass media.

== Programmes ==
Early programmes on the channel included sports broadcasts, reality TV shows, and investigative journalism programmes.

Raaz Hai Een Khana ("The Secrets of This House") took the Special Award at the Seoul Drama Awards in October 2008. Telecast by TOLO and produced by Kaboora Productions, Raaz Hai Een Khana is the first drama series entirely written, acted, filmed, produced and broadcast by Afghans, for Afghans in Afghanistan. It was selected for a Special Prize amongst 152 entries from 33 countries.

TOLO’s first game-show reality programme, Afghan Star, is a competition for Afghan singers, judged by industry people in the Kabul music industry. The programme is an adaptation and remake of the Idol franchise. The show was the subject of the 2009 documentary film Afghan Star, which won two awards at the 2009 Sundance Film Festival.

In 2010 TOLO TV began Eagle Four, a police drama often compared to the American series 24; it was partially funded by the U.S. government.

TOLO TV has also broadcast several foreign programs, including Turkish dramas and the Pakistani animated superhero series Burka Avenger.

Since the 2021 Taliban takeover, TOLO, like other TV channels, have been required to cease broadcasting content showing men and women interacting with each other, severely impacting what entertainment series are able to be broadcast. Afghan Star was removed from air as part of these restrictions. This has led to the production of new single-sex shows on topics such as cooking, travel, and entrepreneurship. The channel has also attempted to create more educational programming to aid girls who are unable to attend school under the Taliban.

== See also ==
- Television in Afghanistan
- TOLOnews
- Lemar TV
- Moby Media Group
