= The Daily Outlook Afghanistan =

English newspaper in Afghanistan

Daily Outlook Afghanistan

- The Daily Outlook Afghanistan
- Type: Daily
- Format: broadsheet
- Publisher: Afghanistan Group of Newspapers
- Founded: 2004; 21 years ago
- Language: English
- Headquarters: Kabul
- Circulation: 10,000 daily
- Website: deleted

The Daily Outlook Afghanistan is the first independent English language newspaper in Afghanistan. It covers national and international news with circulation of 10,000. It is published by Afghanistan Group of Newspapers, an independent media group (managed by Hussain Marefat) which also publishes the Daily Afghanistan, the largest Dari and Pashto paper in Afghanistan. The final news releases on the website were on 14 and 15 August 2021, shortly before the Fall of Kabul.

== Circulation ==
Daily Outlook Afghanistan mostly goes to embassies, non-governmental organizations, United Nations agencies, public places, educational institutions and other organizations. Both papers go to 32 out of 34 provinces. A limited number of copies also go to Pakistan and Dubai.
