= The Afghan Times =

- The Afghan Times logo
- Founder(s): Salma Niazi and Saeedullah Safi
- Editor-in-chief: Salma Niazi
- Deputy editor: Saeedullah Safi
- Language: English, Pashto and Dari
- Website: https://theafghantimes.com/

The Afghan Times is an Afghan journalists founded news platform with investigative news from Afghanistan and about the Afghan women inside and outside Afghanistan. Publishing in Pashto, Dari and English languages.

== Awards ==
1. Afghan Times journalist win Thomson Foundation young journalist award 2024.
2. Afghan times journalist Salma Niazi win One Young World Young Journalist of the year 2025 award.
3. Afghan Times journalist Salma Niazi win Lyra McKe 2025 award.
4. Afghan Times journalist Salma Niazi win AIPS media young reporter 2025 award.

== Description ==
Co founded by Saeedullah Safi and Salma Niazi. The editor of Afghan Times is Salma Niazi.
