= Television in Afghanistan =

Television broadcasts in Afghanistan started in 1978 (Hijri Shamsi 1357). As of 2017, there were around 76 local channels operating in the country; the state television channel is Afghanistan National Television. As with other mass media in Afghanistan, television is regulated by the Ministry of Information and Culture.

== History ==
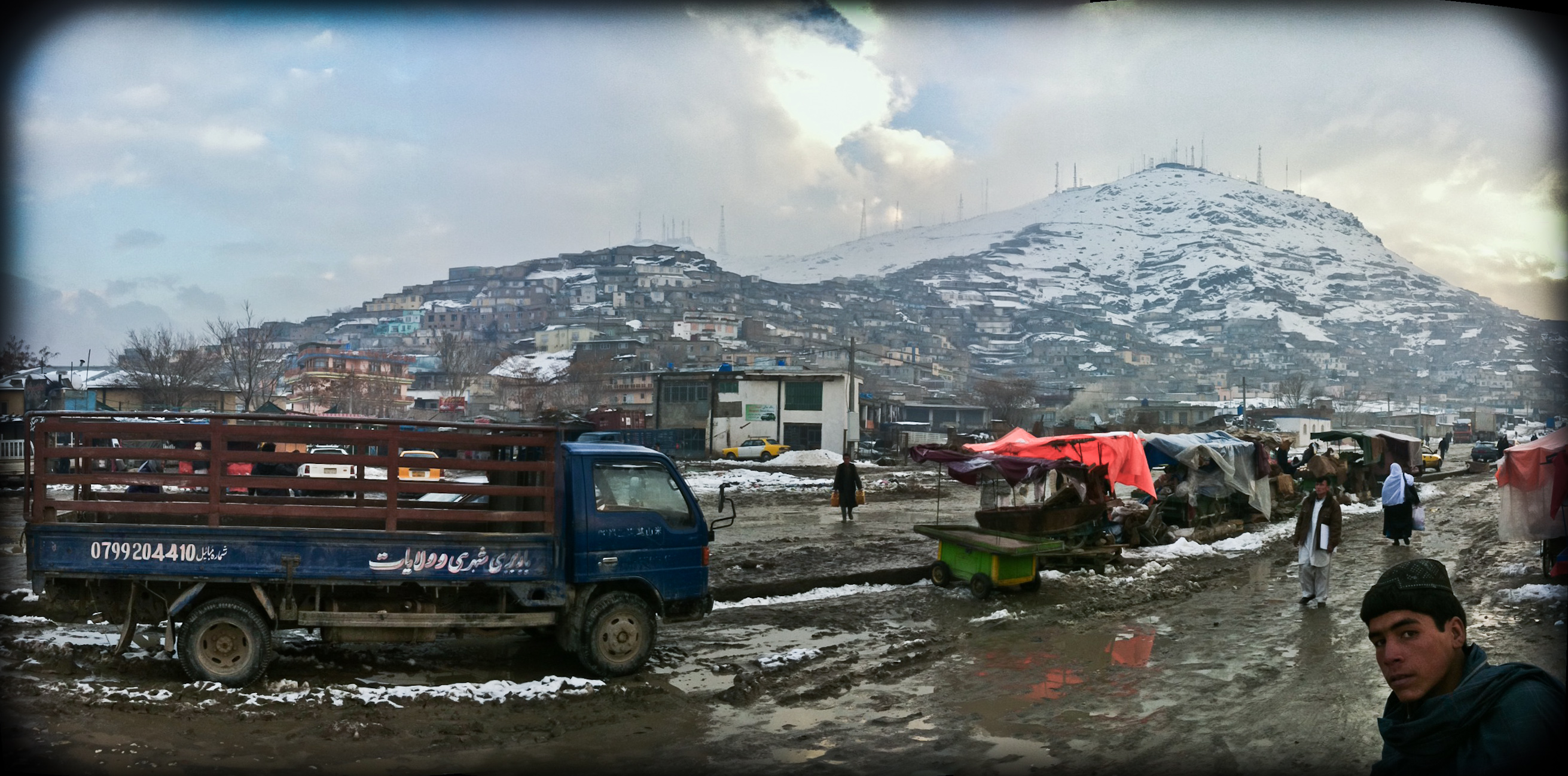
Asamayi (right), popularly nicknamed the TV Mountain, where the transmitters for Kabul are located

The conceptual foundation of television in Afghanistan was first elucidated by Dr. Hafiz Sahar, chief editor of the Eslah national daily newspaper, in his 1967 investigative academic work at New York University. He made a compelling argument and advocated, based on the experiences of other developing countries, the need for television as an educational tool. In addition, he addressed practical solutions to the initial technical problems of bringing television to Afghanistan, stating “Kabul itself is dominated by two high hills that make excellent natural broadcasting towers, thus, simplifying coverage problems”.

Technical and financial aid provided by the Japan International Cooperation Agency (JICA) kickstarted the construction work of the studio and transmitter buildings in 1976, with the work completed by August 1978. The state-owned Radio Television Afghanistan (RTA, previously just Radio Afghanistan) launched the first TV channel in Afghanistan at first broadcasting for two hours daily starting on 19 August 1978, using PAL color system. During the 1980s, many Soviet programs were airing such as the children's show Nu Pogodi!. The studios of RTA were also often used by musicians to record music videos.

From 1992 onward television went into decline when hostilities in the capital Kabul destroyed broadcasting infrastructure. During the Taliban government between 1996 and 2001, television was strictly banned—especially after 8 July 1998—and stores selling TVs, satellite dishes, VCRs, or other similar technology entertainment devices were closed due to its prohibition on depicting all living beings. Anyone owning or watching TV was arrested and punished. The national television broadcaster was closed down, whilst private broadcasters' buildings and studios were smashed by the regime's police. A smaller territory that was controlled by the Northern Alliance in the country's northeast province of Badakhshan had a television channel financed by the Northern Alliance that broadcast, with a weak signal, news and movies to approximately 5,000 people in the city of Fayzabad. The station had a large library of movies and documentaries on VHS and Betamax for broadcasting, and the American movie First Blood was reportedly the most favored by watchers. Nonetheless, the station still had some levels of censorship, banning films containing women in swimsuits, singing or dancing (under the pressure of fundamentalists from the Northern Alliance); however gory and violent scenes were kept intact. The Betamax player that played most of the movies the station had was broken. During this period, wealthy citizens who still had television sets and satellite dishes decided to hide their sets in cupboards.

When the Karzai administration came to power in December 2001, Afghanistan's earliest television channel was relaunched. The transmission site at the summit of Asamayi was seriously damaged after the U.S. invasion, so the relaunched TV in Kabul was only transmitting from a 200 watt set. The JICA, who originally helped develop television in the 1970s, was consulted once again for redeveloping the transmitters. Later, Tolo and Shamshad TV became one of the first commercial TV stations in the country and laid the foundation for an accessible media outlet by offering a large library of shows. Indian and Turkish dramas were quite popular in Afghanistan at the time. With India's help, Afghanistan made its first home-made commercial TV series "Palwasha" in 2007.

In 2014, Afghanistan launched a pact with Eutelsat for a satellite, which was launched in 2014 as Afghansat 1 and transmits TV channels. In 2014, the country commenced a switch from analog to digital TV transmission.

As of 2019, Afghanistan had over 200 local and international television channels, 96 in Kabul and 107 in other provinces of the country.

Since the Taliban ascent to power in August 2021, some media restrictions have been applied that have affected TV in Afghanistan. It was reported in November 2021 that they banned women from appearing in TV dramas. In March 2022 the Taliban banned stations from broadcasting localized Pashto or Dari language broadcasts from the BBC and VOA. Although no channels have been ordered to shut, a few stations decided to shut due to uncertainty or sudden lack of funding, including 3Sport which was the only channel dedicated to sports, and general entertainment channel Ayna TV. In May 2022, female presenters on TV were told to cover their faces.

As of November 2023, after two years of uncertainty, some channels have returned, such as Mashal TV. However, more than half of the 547 registered media outlets in 2021 have since vanished. Among the 150 TV channels, fewer than 70 continue to operate, and out of the 307 radio stations, only 170 remain on air. The number of news agencies decreased from 31 to 18 during this period.

== Television ownership and viewership ==
According to a market research survey conducted by the Afghan Wireless Communication Company in 2023, with over 7,100 randomly selected participants from various regions of Afghanistan, Ariana Television Network (and its news channel Ariana News) is the most-watched television channel in Afghanistan followed by TOLO TV (and its news channel TOLOnews), Shamshad TV, and Lemar TV.

=== Transmission ===
In Afghanistan, many people watch TV through traditional analog terrestrial signals using (mostly indoor) antennas. It is the dominant method of watching TV in urban areas. Satellite transmission is much more common in rural areas than urban. Cable rates are low for both urban and rural areas.

In January 2013, Afghanistan's Ministry of Communication and Information Technology held a meeting with TV broadcasters about plans to switch from analog to digital transmission systems. Afghanistan has adopted the DVB-T2 standard and the switch-over would begin in Kabul.

On August 31, 2014, Afghanistan's digital terrestrial TV system called Oqaab was officially inaugurated by the second vice president of Afghanistan, H. E. Mohammad Karim Khalili, and Minister of Communications and Information Technology, H. E. Amirzai Sangin, in a ceremony at Kabul's Serena Hotel.

== See also ==
- Mass media in Afghanistan
- List of radio stations in Afghanistan
