= Shamshad TV =

Pashto-language television channel

Shamshad Media Network
- Type: Satellite television network
- Country: Afghanistan; India (available via JioTV app); Malaysia (available via Unifi TV app)
- Headquarters: Chaman-e-Hozori, Kabul, Afghanistan

Ownership
- Owner: Fazel Karim Fazel
- Key people: Abdul Karim Fazel

History
- Founded: 2005
- Launched: 2006
- Founder: Fazel Karim Fazel

Links
- Website: www.shamshadfm.com/LIVE/

Shamshad Media Network (Pashto: شمشاد) is based in Afghanistan and Dubai. Shamshad Media Network is a private and an independent network based in Afghanistan, which began transmission in 2005.

Shamshad's broadcast area covers a large portion of the country where ethnic Pashtuns live and also covering isolated areas. Shamshad programs are mainly (85%) in Pashto language, providing educational TV shows, news, family dramas, musical shows, comedy programs, children's game shows, women empowerment programs, Islamic educational programs, political and current affairs programs, entertainment programs, sports programs, criminal incidents programs and programs to both local areas of Afghanistan as well as other countries via satellite, IPTV and local transmitters.

Shamshad TV was suspended per orders of the Taliban intelligence services on 18 October 2025; the reasons are unclear, but when Taliban agents entered the station, they ordered its operations to be suspended indefinitely.

== Coverage ==
Shamshad TV installed towers to cover most remote districts around the country, especially in the south. Shamshad currently provides free-to-air services to viewers in Kabul, Logar, Kapisa, Parwan, Wardak, Nangarhar, Laghman, Balkh (Mazar-e-Sharif), Paktia, Khost, Kunduz, Herat, Kandahar, Helmand, Kunar, Baghlan, Ghazni, Nimruz, Farah, Zabul, Badakhshan and other provinces. Beside (free to air service) the main cities are also covered by cable operators. New transmitters have been installed in Spin Boldak and Torkham for terrestrial coverage across border in the tribal area. Furthermore, 90% area in the neighbouring Pakistani provinces of Khyber Pakhtunkhwa and Balochistan is covered by cable operators.

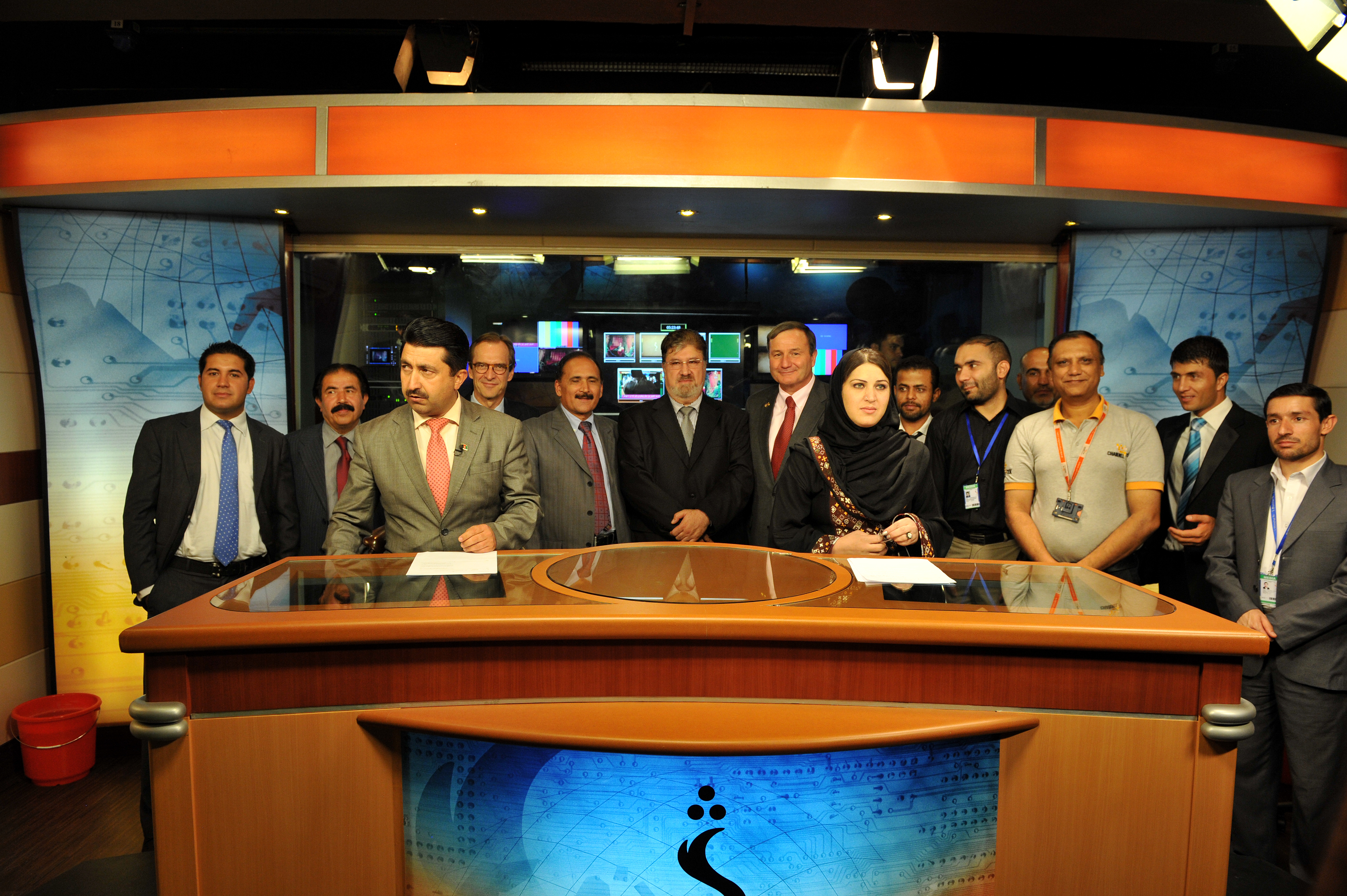
Shamshad TV studio began transmitting in 2005 and mainly broadcasts in the Pashto language

=== Shamshad Radio ===
Shamshad Radio is a part of Shamshad SMN.

SMN (Shamshad Media Network) covered by:

- Terrestrial (80%)
- Cable Operator Major Cities
- Satellite 57 Countries
- Live Steam Major Cities
- IPTV World Wide
- Social Medial World Wide

== Shamshad TV programs ==
Shamshad translates different dramas from Turkish; a fight drama against terrorism Sefket Tape (Dare Morchal), Team One (Shaheen), Mirna and Khalil (Mirna ao khalil), Iki Dunya Anasinda (Sahra), Yeni Gelin (Nawy) and various other drama series.

Shamshad also translates many drama series from Hindi; Karal Bagh (Karal bagh) a family issues based story, a love story based drama series Qabool Hai (Salgai), Be Had (Junoon) and Koch Rang Peyar ke (Da meni rang) a family-based love story drama.

Shamshad produces its own programs like Roon Sahar (morning show inviting different peoples from society to discuss social and political issues with them), Jor pa Khair (local music), Takkan (comedy program), cooking show, in Ghazal shpa (music show) inviting different musicians from all over the country, Khaza ao Tolana (special program for women asking about their life and working area), Tawda bahsona (a current affair show on daily basis) Deni Larkhowany (inviting Islamic scholars to discuss different issues and give solution to that problems) and different other programs.

Shamshad Film Production launched the first Full HD Pashto Created drama series Sola and Seyal (Sola ao seyal) around the world.

== Logo ==
Shamshad Media Network logo is a decorative representation of the network's name written using Pashto. It was selected by the founder, Fazel Karim Fazel. It's the combination of two SS and three dots on the top, that represent Sheen in Pashto, and the two SS are Sham Shad.

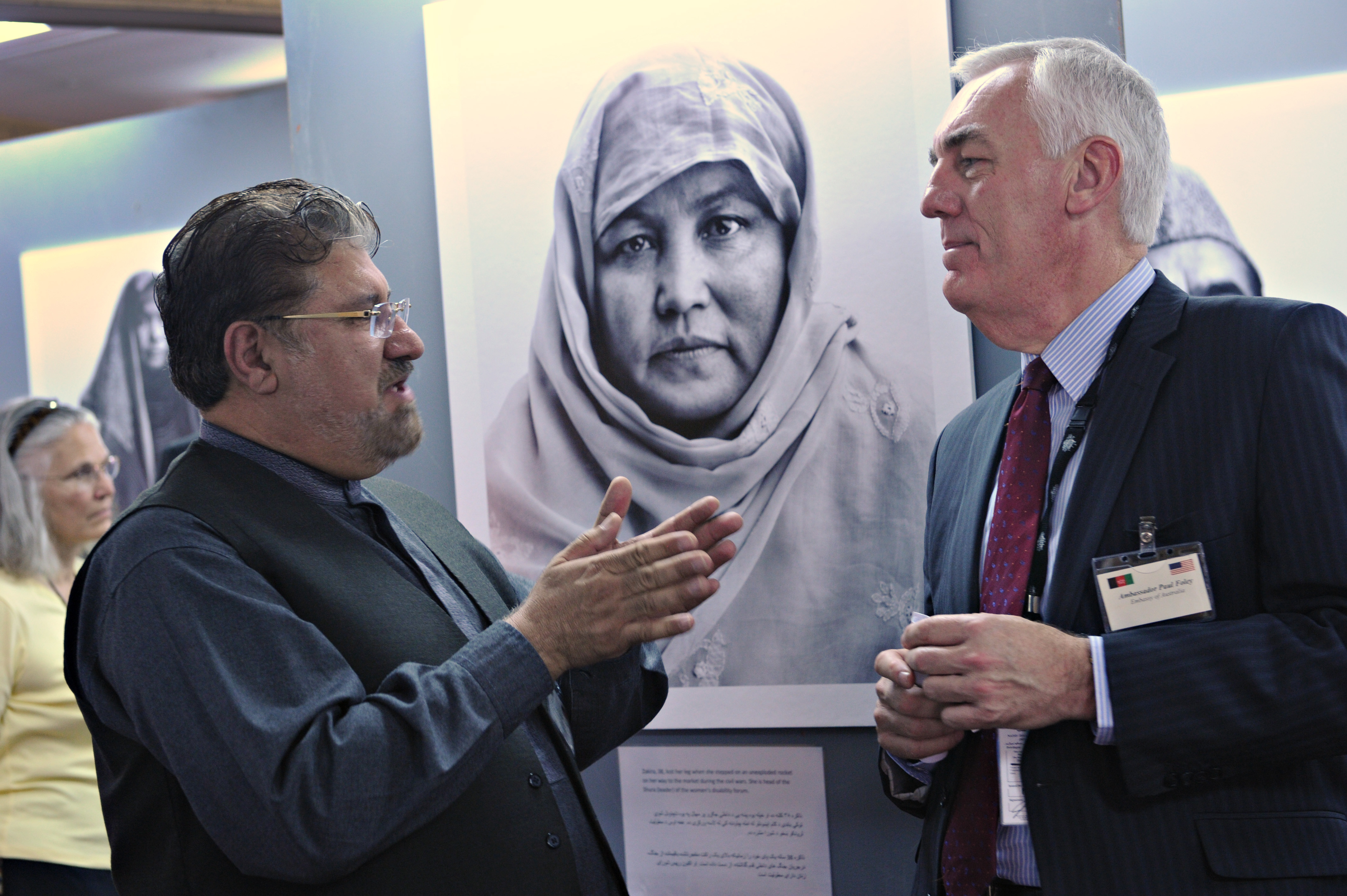
Fazal Karim Fazal speaking with Marco Grob at the U.S. Embassy in Kabul, Afghanistan.

== Attacks ==
On 7 November 2017, Shamshad Media in Kabul was attacked by armed gunmen and suicide bombers. A security guard was killed and 20 people were wounded. ISIS claimed responsibility for the attack.

== Taliban shutdown Shamshad TV ==
During the clashes, the Taliban shut down Shamshad TV, a private broadcaster in Kabul, accusing it of failing to "adequately" cover the recent border fighting with Pakistan and of not defending the "Taliban’s position." The suspension, following a direct order from the Taliban’s General Directorate of Intelligence, has raised concerns about media freedom in Afghanistan. Shamshad TV, one of the few outlets providing relatively independent coverage of regional and political developments, was criticized for not aligning with the Taliban’s narrative. Media organizations such as the Afghanistan Journalists Center (AFJC) and the Afghanistan Media Support Organization (AMSO) condemned the move as blatant interference in the press and called for the reversal of the decision, stressing that such actions violate media independence and freedom of expression. Shamshad TV has yet to comment on the shutdown.
