= Deaths in June 2008 =

The following is a list of notable deaths in June 2008.

Entries for each day are listed alphabetically by surname. A typical entry lists information in the following sequence:

- Name, age, country of citizenship at birth, subsequent country of citizenship (if applicable), reason for notability, cause of death (if known), and reference.

== June 2008 ==
=== 1 ===
- Anne d'Harnoncourt, 64, American chief executive of the Philadelphia Museum of Art, natural causes.
- Brian Doyle, 77, Australian Olympic bronze medal-winning (1956) rower.
- Maurizio Galli, 75, Italian Roman Catholic bishop, Bishop of Fidenza (1998–2007).
- Al Jones, 62, British folk singer.
- Terry Keane, 68, Irish columnist and fashion journalist, long illness.
- Alton Kelley, 67, American graphic designer and psychedelic artist, after long illness.
- Tommy Lapid, 76, Israeli journalist and politician, deputy prime minister (2003–2004), cancer.
- Pat Regan, 53, British anti-gun activist, stabbing.
- Yves Saint Laurent, 71, French fashion designer, founder of Yves Saint Laurent brand, brain cancer.
- Jon Vickers, 82, British trade union leader.
- Alicia Zubasnabar de De la Cuadra, 92, Argentine human rights activist, first President of the Grandmothers of the Plaza de Mayo.

=== 2 ===
- Nasser bin Zayed Al Nahyan, 41, Emirati royal, helicopter crash.
- Sheela Basrur, 51, Canadian health administrator, Toronto medical officer of health during SARS crisis, leiomyosarcoma.
- Sheriff Mustapha Dibba, 71, Gambian politician, first Vice President (1965–1975), speaker (2002–2006), heart attack.
- Bo Diddley, 79, American rock and roll and blues singer, songwriter, and guitarist, heart failure.
- Nodar Dzhordzhikiya, 86, Georgian Olympic silver medal-winning (1952) basketball player. ()
- Ferenc Fejtő, 98, Hungarian-born French historian and journalist, after long illness.
- Hiroshi Inoue, 90, Japanese entomologist
- Ángel Malvicino, 87, Argentine Olympic rower.
- Ken Naganuma, 77, Japanese football player and manager.
- Mel Ferrer, 90, American actor, film director and producer heart failure (War and Peace, Lili).
- Lois Roisman, 70, American philanthropist and playwright, heart failure.
- Paul Sills, 80, American theater director and comedian, co-founder of The Second City improv troupe, pneumonia.
- Frank Tsosie Thompson, 87, American Navajo code talker and World War II veteran.

=== 3 ===
- Ken Aitken, 79, Australian footballer.
- John A. Choi Jae-seon, 96, South Korean Bishop of Pusan (1957–1973).
- John Creaney, 74, Northern Irish barrister.
- Pat Egan, 90, Canadian ice hockey defenceman (Boston Bruins).
- Trevor Kaine, 80, Australian chief minister of the ACT (1989–1991).
- Tadeusz Kotz, 94, Polish World War II fighter ace.
- Grigory Romanov, 85, Russian first secretary of the Leningrad obkom (1970–1983), Politburo member (1976–1985).
- Carl H. Stevens Jr., 78, American evangelist, heart failure.

=== 4 ===
- Travis Alexander, 30, American motivational speaker, homicide by stabbing.
- John Armitt, 82, New Zealand wrestler.
- Matthew J. Bruccoli, 76, American professor of English at University of South Carolina, expert on F. Scott Fitzgerald.
- Jack Byrne, 57, Canadian member of Newfoundland and Labrador House of Assembly, mayor of LB-MC-OC (1986–1993).
- Ruby Chow, 87, American Chinese restaurateur.
- Bill Finegan, 91, American jazz arranger and bandleader, pneumonia.
- Ivan Herasymov, 87, Ukrainian politician, oldest member of the Verkhovna Rada.
- John Long, 94, British Anglican priest, Archdeacon of Ely (1970–1981).
- Harriet McBryde Johnson, 50, American attorney and disability rights activist.
- Agata Mróz-Olszewska, 26, Polish international volleyball player, myelodysplastic syndrome.
- Frank Muller, 57, Dutch-born American actor and audiobook narrator.
- Curtis Osborne, 38, American murderer, execution by lethal injection.
- Jonathan Routh, 80, British co-star of UK Candid Camera.
- Nikos Sergianopoulos, 55, Greek actor, homicide by stabbing.
- James Young, 78, American White House physician (John F. Kennedy, Lyndon B. Johnson).

=== 5 ===
- Rajendra Agnihotri, 70, Indian politician.
- Frank Blackmore, 92, British traffic engineer and inventor of the mini-roundabout.
- Angus Calder, 66, British historian and writer, lung cancer.
- Dick Evans, 86, Australian politician, member of the New South Wales Legislative Council (1969–1978).
- Colin Kay, 82, New Zealand Mayor of Auckland (1980–1983), stroke.
- Misha Lajovic, 86, Slovenian-born Australian politician, Senator for New South Wales (1975–1985).
- Jacklyn H. Lucas, 80, American World War II veteran, youngest marine to be awarded the Medal of Honor, cancer.
- Eugenio Montejo, 70, Venezuelan poet, essayist and ambassador, stomach cancer.
- Bruce Purchase, 69, New Zealand-born British actor.
- Rubén Váldez, 85, Peruvian Olympic shooter.
- Vic Wilson, 87, British cricketer, captain of Yorkshire, Wisden Cricketer of the Year (1961).

=== 6 ===
- Bobby Anderson, 75, American actor (It's a Wonderful Life), cancer.
- Jimmy Croll, 88, American Hall of Fame thoroughbred race horse trainer.
- David Mark Hill, 48, American spree killer.
- Saeko Himuro, 51, Japanese novelist and essayist, lung cancer.
- Ray Mallouf, 89, American football player (Chicago Cardinals).
- Gene Persson, 74, American theatrical and film producer (You're a Good Man, Charlie Brown).
- László Péter, 78, Hungarian historian.
- Ferenc Sánta, 81, Hungarian author.
- Ed Tchorzewski, 65, Canadian politician, Saskatchewan finance minister and Legislative Assembly member, cancer.
- Paul Tessier, 90, French plastic surgeon.
- Victor Wégria, 71, Belgian football player (Belgium, RFC Liège).
- Dwight White, 58, American football player (Pittsburgh Steelers), complications from back surgery.
- Francisco José Ynduráin, 67, Spanish physicist.

=== 7 ===
- Ed Beatty, 76, American football player (San Francisco 49ers, Pittsburgh Steelers).
- Jimmy Bonthrone, 76, Scottish footballer and manager (Aberdeen F.C.).
- Bill Coday, 66, American singer, stroke.
- Nasteh Dahir, 36, Somali journalist, vice-president of the National Union of Somali Journalists, shot.
- Thomas Erskine, 91, Australian politician, member of the New South Wales Legislative Council (1970–1978).
- Rudy Fernandez, 55, Filipino action movie star, periampullary cancer.
- Joseph Kabui, 53–54, Papua New Guinean secessionist, first president of the Autonomous Region of Bougainville, heart attack.
- Mustafa Khalil, 87, Egyptian prime minister (1978–1980), architect of the Camp David Accords peace treaty.
- Roelof Koops, 98, Dutch Olympic speed skater.
- Jim McKay, 86, American sportscaster (Wide World of Sports, 12 Olympic Games), natural causes.
- Dino Risi, 91, Italian film director (Il Sorpasso, Profumo di donna), natural causes.
- Horst Skoff, 39, Austrian tennis player, heart attack.
- Erick Wujcik, 57, American game designer, pancreatic cancer.

=== 8 ===
- Šaban Bajramović, 72, Serbian Romani musician, heart attack.
- Charles-Noël Barbès, 93, Canadian politician, Member of Parliament (1957–1958).
- Florența Crăciunescu, 53, Romanian Olympic bronze medal-winning (1984) discus thrower.
- Gene Damschroder, 86, American politician, member of the Ohio House of Representatives (1973–1983), plane crash.
- Jake Flake, 72, American politician, Arizona representative (1997–2005) and senator since 2005, heart attack.
- Michitaka Kinami, 87, Japanese Olympic hurdler.
- Ruslana Korshunova, 20, Kazakh supermodel, suicide by jumping.
- Danilo Lagbas, 56, Filipino politician, member of the House of Representatives since 2004, lung and liver cancer.
- Abdul Samad Rohani, 25, Afghan journalist, shot.
- Peter Rühmkorf, 78, German writer, cancer.
- Edith Derby Williams, 90, American historian, granddaughter of Theodore Roosevelt.

=== 9 ===
- Karen Asrian, 28, Armenian chess grandmaster, heart attack.
- Algis Budrys, 77, American science fiction writer.
- Peter Jon de Vos, 69, American diplomat.
- Nan Hoover, 77, American-born Dutch artist.
- Alton W. Knappenberger, 84, American Medal of Honor recipient.
- Esteban Mellino, 63, Argentine actor, heart attack.
- Josef Minsch, 66, Swiss Olympic alpine skier.
- Elly M. Peterson, 94, American first female chair of Michigan Republican Party (1965–1969).

=== 10 ===
- Chinghiz Aitmatov, 79, Kyrgyzstani writer (The Day Lasts More Than a Hundred Years), respiratory and renal failure.
- Gesner Armand, 71, Haitian painter.
- Eliot Asinof, 88, American writer (Eight Men Out), pneumonia.
- Ralph Bacerra, 70, American ceramic artist, lung cancer.
- David Brierly, 73, British actor, (Doctor Who), cancer.
- Tyrone Jones, 46, American Canadian football linebacker (Winnipeg Blue Bombers), brain cancer.
- Kipkalya Kones, 56, Kenyan politician, plane crash.
- Lorna Laboso, 47, Kenyan politician, plane crash.
- John Rauch, 80, American football coach and player.

=== 11 ===
- Lamidi Adedibu, 80, Nigerian politician.
- Ove Andersson, 70, Swedish rally driver and principal of the Toyota F1 racing team, rally crash.
- Reid Bryson, 88, American meteorologist.
- Brian Budd, 56, Canadian soccer player.
- Jean Desailly, 87, French actor.
- Mitch Frerotte, 43, American football player (Buffalo Bills), heart attack.
- Sir Frank Hassett, 90, Australian head of the Australian Defence Force (1975–1977).
- Taras Kermauner, 78, Slovenian literary historian, philosopher and playwright.
- Adam Ledwoń, 34, Polish footballer, suicide by hanging.
- Anne Clark Martindell, 93, American politician and diplomat, ambassador to New Zealand (1979–1981).
- Mickey McMahan, 77, American big band musician (Les Brown and Lawrence Welk orchestras), neuropathy.
- James Reaney, 81, Canadian playwright.
- Gunnar Solum, 78, Norwegian politician.
- Võ Văn Kiệt, 85, Vietnamese politician, reformist, prime minister (1991–1997).

=== 12 ===
- Ward Boston, 84, American Navy attorney, investigated USS Liberty incident, complications from pneumonia.
- Danny Davis, 83, American country musician and trumpet player, cardiac arrest.
- Miroslav Dvořák, 56, Czech ice hockey player (Philadelphia Flyers), throat cancer.
- Charlie Jones, 77, American sportscaster, heart attack.
- Dan Kuykendall, 83, American politician, representative from Tennessee (1967–1975).
- Stewart Rawlings Mott, 70, American philanthropist, cancer.
- Gunther Stent, 84, German molecular biologist, pneumonia.
- Derek Tapscott, 75, British football international (Arsenal, Cardiff City, Wales).

=== 13 ===
- Mel Krause, 80, American college baseball coach and player, myeloid leukemia.
- Maryon Lane, 77, South African ballerina.
- Bruce Lester, 96, British actor.
- John Malcolm, 72, Scottish actor.
- Tim Russert, 58, American journalist and television host (Meet the Press), coronary thrombosis.
- Sir Dennis Weatherstone, 77, British banker, cancer.

=== 14 ===
- Baldev Singh Khiala, 73, Indian Politician, member of legislative assembly.
- Syed Wajid Ali, 97, Pakistani business magnate, member of the IOC.
- Jerry M. Anderson, 74, American academic administrator.
- Charles Albert Buswell, 94, American Roman Catholic bishop of Pueblo (1959–1979).
- Chu Fu-sung, 93, Taiwanese foreign minister (1979–1987).
- Kees Fens, 78, Dutch essayist.
- Jamelão, 95, Brazilian samba singer, multiple organ failure.
- Alan Johnston, Lord Johnston, 66, British judge, heart attack.
- Rafael del Pino, 87, Spanish businessman.
- Emilio Óscar Rabasa, 84, Mexican secretary of foreign affairs (1970–1975), heart failure.
- Esbjörn Svensson, 44, Swedish jazz musician, diving accident.
- Werner Vetterli, 79, Swiss Olympic modern pentathlete.

=== 15 ===
- Mel Agee, 39, American football player (Atlanta Falcons), heart attack.
- Thangamma Appakutty, 83, Sri Lankan social activist and educator.
- Franklin Otis Booth Jr., 84, American billionaire, Los Angeles Times executive, amyotrophic lateral sclerosis.
- John Buzhardt, 71, American baseball player (1958–1968).
- Ray Getliffe, 94, Canadian ice hockey player, liver cancer.
- Johnathan Goddard, 27, American football player, motorcycle accident.
- Billy Muffett, 77, American baseball pitcher.
- Walter Netsch, 88, American architect, pneumonia.
- Ole-Jørgen Nilsen, 72, Norwegian actor and theatre director, Bechterew's disease.
- Tony Schwartz, 84, American co-creator of President Johnson's "Daisy ad", heart valve stenosis.
- Jon Tecedor, 32, Spanish weightlifter, motorcycle accident.
- Stan Winston, 62, American special effects and make-up artist (Jurassic Park, The Terminator, Aliens), Oscar winner (1987, 1992, 1994), multiple myeloma.

=== 16 ===
- Tom Compernolle, 32, Belgian national 5000m and cross country running champion, traffic collision.
- Mike Dukes, 72, American professional football player, traffic collision.
- Gareth Jones, 28, Welsh rugby union player (Neath), complications of neck injury during game.
- Margaret Kitchin, 94, British pianist.
- René Paul, 87, British Olympic fencer.
- Bert Shepard, 87, American baseball pitcher (Washington Senators).
- Mario Rigoni Stern, 86, Italian writer and World War II veteran.
- David Topliss, 58, British rugby league footballer, heart attack.
- Caylee Anthony, 2, American murder victim.

=== 17 ===
- Ingela Agardh, 59, Swedish journalist and television presenter, breast cancer.
- Henry Beckman, 86, Canadian character actor and screenwriter.
- Sarah Bryant, 26, British soldier, improvised explosive device.
- Henry Chadwick, 87, British theologian, dean of Christ Church, Oxford (1969–1979).
- Cyd Charisse, 86, American actress and dancer (Singin' in the Rain, Brigadoon, The Band Wagon), heart attack.
- Hewitt Crane, 81, American computer engineer, complications of Alzheimer's disease.
- Wally Denny, 101, American deputy chief scout of Scouts Canada.
- Davey Lee, 83, American child actor.
- Henryk Mandelbaum, 85, Polish survivor of the Auschwitz-Birkenau concentration camp.
- Tsutomu Miyazaki, 45, Japanese serial killer, execution by hanging.
- Josef Pohnetal, 83, Austrian Olympic cyclist.
- Mark Sacks, 54, British philosopher, prostate cancer.
- Michael Shernoff, 57, American AIDS activist, pancreatic cancer.

=== 18 ===
- Jean Delannoy, 100, French film director (La symphonie pastorale, The Hunchback of Notre Dame, Les amitiés particulières).
- Stella Greenall, 81, British education activist.
- Marion Jorgensen, 96, American philanthropist and civic leader.
- Miyuki Kanbe, 24, Japanese actress, heart failure.
- Ed Lorraine, 80, Canadian politician and farmer.
- Tasha Tudor, 92, American author and illustrator.

=== 19 ===
- David Caminer, 92, British computer pioneer.
- Tim Carter, 40, British football goalkeeper (Sunderland, Millwall), goalkeeping coach, suspected suicide by hanging.
- Cheikh Amadou Fall, 62, Senegalese Olympic basketball player.
- Anselm Genders, 88, British clergyman, Bishop of Bermuda (1977–1982).
- Barun Sengupta, 74, Indian journalist, after long illness.
- Bennie Swain, 77, American basketball player (Boston Celtics), cancer.
- Bomber Wells, 77, British cricketer.

=== 20 ===
- Adelaide Bishop, 79, American operatic soprano, musical theatre actress, and opera director, traffic collision.
- Wilber Hardee, 89, American founder of Hardee's fast food restaurant.
- Mohammed al Janahi, Emirati film and theatre actor, art director.
- James Earl Reed, 49, American convicted murderer, execution by electric chair.
- Jean-Pierre Thystère Tchicaya, 72, Congolese politician.

=== 21 ===
- Harry J. Aleo, 88, American businessman.
- Adalberto Almeida y Merino, 92, Mexican prelate.
- Jean Audoubert, 84, French rugby union player (Castres Olympique) and rugby league player (Toulouse Olympique, national team).
- Scott Kalitta, 46, American drag racer (NHRA), race crash.
- Kermit Love, 91, American puppeteer (The Muppets, Sesame Street), heart failure.
- William Vince, 44, Canadian film producer (Capote, Air Bud, Just Friends), cancer.
- Freddie Williams, 65, British businessman and bookmaker, heart attack.

=== 22 ===
- Timothy Ansah, 88, Ghanaian educationist and politician.
- Odd Aukrust, 92, Norwegian economist.
- Bryan Baptiste, 52, American politician, mayor of Kauai, cardiac arrest.
- Jon-Erik Beckjord, 69, American paranormal researcher, prostate cancer.
- Natalia Bekhtereva, 83, Russian neuroscientist and psychologist.
- George Carlin, 71, American comedian and actor (Bill & Ted's Excellent Adventure, The Prince of Tides, Dogma), heart failure.
- Albert Cossery, 94, Egyptian-born French writer.
- Dino Crescentini, 60, Sammarinese Olympic bobsledder.
- Jens Petter Ekornes, 66, Norwegian entrepreneur.
- Dody Goodman, 93, American actress (Mary Hartman, Mary Hartman, Grease, Splash).
- Jane McGrath, 42, British-born Australian cancer support campaigner, wife of Glenn McGrath, complications of cancer surgery.
- Revius Ortique Jr., 84, American jurist, first African American Louisiana Supreme Court justice, complications of a stroke.
- Ron Stitfall, 82, British footballer (Cardiff City, Wales).
- Fyodor Uglov, 103, Russian oldest practicing surgeon in the world.

=== 23 ===
- Claudio Capone, 55, Italian voice actor, stroke.
- Arthur Chung, 90, Guyanese politician, first president (1970–1980).
- John Furlong, 75, American actor (Wyatt Earp, The Front Page, Flamingo Road).
- Vic Hershkowitz, 89, American handball player, lung disease.
- Mick Hill, 60, Welsh footballer (Sheffield United, Ipswich, Crystal Palace, Wales).
- Judith Holzmeister, 88, Austrian actress.
- Fabrizia Ramondino, 72, Italian writer.
- Vlado Taneski, 56, Macedonian journalist, murder suspect, suicide.

=== 24 ===
- Maurice Russell Brown, 95, Canadian mining journalist.
- Ruth Cardoso, 77, Brazilian anthropologist and professor, wife of Fernando Henrique Cardoso, cardiac arrhythmia.
- Dave Carpenter, 48, American jazz bassist, heart attack.
- Eric Chia, 74, Malaysian industrialist.
- Charlie Dempsey, 86, New Zealand football official, after short illness.
- Charles W. Dryden, 87, American serviceman and academic, member of the Tuskegee Airmen.
- Leonid Hurwicz, 90, American economist, mathematician and 2007 Nobel laureate.
- Viktor Kuzkin, 67, Russian ice hockey player, diving accident.
- Mallikarjuna Rao, 57, Indian actor, leukaemia.
- Shao Hua, 69, Chinese photographer, PLA major general, daughter-in-law of Mao Zedong.
- Józef Szajna, 86, Polish stage director and painter, natural causes.
- Ira Tucker, 83, American lead singer (The Dixie Hummingbirds), heart failure.

=== 25 ===
- G. M. Banatwala, 74, Indian Islamic spokesman in parliament.
- Gerard Batliner, 79, Liechtensteinian head of government (1962–1970).
- Warren J. Ferguson, 87, American federal judge (Ninth Circuit).
- Betty Hanson, 89, Manx politician, first woman elected to the Legislative Council of the Tynwald (1982–1988).
- Alla Kazanskaya, 88, Russian actress, widow of Boris Barnet.
- Charles Percy Parkhurst, 95, American museum curator and one of the "Monuments Men".
- Bill Robinson, 86, Canadian ice hockey player.
- Lyall Watson, 69, South African writer and botanist.

=== 26 ===
- Raouf Abbas, 68, Egyptian historian.
- Lilyan Chauvin, 82, French-born American actress (Private Benjamin, Catch Me If You Can, Predator 2).
- Asbjørn Haugstvedt, 81, Norwegian Christian Democratic politician.
- Pedro Luis Díaz Lanz, 81, Cuban soldier and defector.
- Tony Melody, 85, British actor.
- Jeanne Omelenchuk, 77, American Olympic speed skater.

=== 27 ===
- Frédéric Botton, 71, French composer.
- Marie Castello, 93, American fortune teller made famous in Bruce Springsteen's 4th of July, Asbury Park (Sandy).
- Lyn Davis, 64, New Zealand rugby union player (Canterbury, national team).
- Francesco Domenico Chiarello, 109, Italian penultimate national survivor of World War I.
- Peter Dickson, 65, Australian Olympic rower, posterior cortical atrophy.
- Günter Dohrow, 80, German Olympic athlete.
- Sasha Gabor, 63, Hungarian-born Norwegian pornographic actor, heart failure.
- Alex Garbowski, 86, American baseball player (Detroit Tigers).
- Vinicio Gómez, 48, Guatemalan politician, minister of the interior (since 2008), helicopter crash.
- Kalevi Heinänen, 81, Finnish Olympic basketball player.
- Raymond Lefèvre, 78, French conductor.
- Sam Manekshaw, 94, Indian field marshal and chief of Army Staff, bronchopneumonia.
- Daihachi Oguchi, 84, Japanese master of taiko drumming, traffic collision.
- Leonard Pennario, 83, American concert pianist, complications of Parkinson's disease.
- Alejandro Puccio, 49, Argentine rugby player and convicted murderer (Puccio family), infection.
- Lenka Reinerová, 92, Czech author.
- Polk Robison, 96, American college basketball coach, natural causes.
- Michael Turner, 37, American comic book artist (Witchblade, Justice League, Black Panther) and publisher, chondrosarcoma.

=== 28 ===
- Irina Baronova, 89, Russian ballerina, last of the three "Baby Ballerinas".
- Douglas Dollarhide, 85, American first black mayor of Compton, California.
- Terry Fields, 71, British MP for Liverpool Broadgreen (1983–1992), lung cancer.
- Sangeen Wali Khan, 49, Pakistani politician, lung cancer.
- Ruslana Korshunova, 20, Kazakhstani model, suicide by jumping.
- Nicolae Linca, 79, Romanian Olympic gold medal-winning boxer (1956).
- Kenneth Macke, 69, American retail executive, complications of Parkinson's disease.
- Ronnie Mathews, 72, American jazz pianist.
- Christopher McWilliams, 44, Irish member of the INLA, convicted murderer, cancer.
- Stig Olin, 87, Swedish actor and songwriter.
- Robert Seamans, 89, American space scientist, Deputy Administrator of NASA (1965–1968).
- Robert Lewis Shayon, 95, American writer and radio producer, pneumonia.

=== 29 ===
- Arthur R. Albohn, 86, American politician.
- William R. Bennett Jr., 78, American physicist, esophageal cancer.
- Don S. Davis, 65, American character actor (Twin Peaks, Stargate SG-1, A League of Their Own), heart attack.
- Ben Kinsella, 16, English murder victim, stabbing.
- William Nigh, 87, American politician.
- Eladio Vicuña Aránguiz, 97, Chilean prelate of the Roman Catholic Church, pneumonia.
- Vladimir Vinogradov, 52, Russian banker.
- Hewitt Wilson, 84, British Anglican priest, Chaplain-in-Chief of the RAF.

=== 30 ===
- Frances Bult, 95, Australian Olympic swimmer.
- Anthony Crockett, 62, Welsh Anglican prelate, Bishop of Bangor (2004–2008).
- Rose Dieng-Kuntz, 52, Senegalese French computer scientist.
- Just An Excuse, 9, New Zealand Standardbred racehorse, euthanized.
- Kewal Krishan, 84, Indian politician, speaker of the Punjab Legislative Assembly (1973–1977, since 2002), heart attack.
- Arthur Ryan Smith, 89, Canadian politician, serviceman and Order of Canada recipient, cancer.
- Ángel Tavira, 83, Mexican musician and actor, kidney complications.
