= Pygmalion (play) =

1913 play by George Bernard Shaw

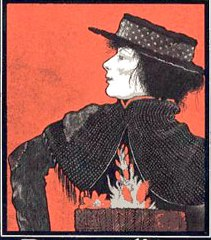
- Illustration depicting Mrs Patrick Campbell as Eliza Doolittle
- Written by: George Bernard Shaw
- Characters: Professor Henry Higgins; Colonel Pickering; Eliza Doolittle; Alfred Doolittle; Mrs Pearce; Mrs Higgins; Mrs Eynsford-Hill; Clara Eynsford-Hill; Freddy Eynsford-Hill
- Genre: Romantic comedy, social criticism
- Setting: London, England

Premiere
- Date: 16 October 1913
- Place: Hofburg Theatre in Vienna, Austria

Pygmalion is a play written by George Bernard Shaw in 1912, named after the Greek mythological figure. It was first presented onstage in German translation, premiering at the Hofburg Theatre in Vienna on 16 October 1913. Its English-language premiere took place at His Majesty's Theatre in the West End of London in April 1914 and starred Herbert Beerbohm Tree as a phonetics professor, Henry Higgins, and Mrs Patrick Campbell as a Cockney flower girl, Eliza Doolittle.

Pygmalion became Shaw's most popular play, enduring in popular culture as the heavily adapted and romanticized My Fair Lady (1956 musical and 1964 film).

== Inspiration ==
In ancient Greek mythology, Pygmalion fell in love with one of his sculptures, which then came to life. The general idea of that myth was a popular subject for Victorian era British playwrights, including one of Shaw's influences, W. S. Gilbert, who wrote a successful play based on the story called Pygmalion and Galatea that was first presented in 1871. Shaw would also have been familiar with the musical Adonis and the burlesque version, Galatea, or Pygmalion Reversed.

Eliza Doolittle was inspired by Kitty Wilson, owner of a flower stall at Norfolk Street, Strand, in London. Wilson continued selling flowers at the stall until September 1958. Her daughter, Betty Benton, then took over, but was forced to close down a month later when the local authority decreed that the corner was no longer "designated" for street trading.

Shaw mentioned that the character of Professor Henry Higgins was inspired by several British professors of phonetics: Alexander Melville Bell, Alexander J. Ellis, Tito Pagliardini, but above all the cantankerous Henry Sweet.

The English journalist George Orwell asserted in 1944 that: "The central plot of Shaw's play, Pygmalion, is lifted out of [Tobias Smollett's novel] Peregrine Pickle, and I believe that no one has ever pointed this out in print, which suggests that few people can have read the book." He apparently was referring to chapter 87, which reads:

... he moreover observed, that the conversation of those who are dignified with the appellation of polite company, is neither more edifying nor entertaining than that which is met with among the lower classes of mankind; and that the only essential difference, in point of demeanour, is the form of an education, which the meanest capacity can acquire, without much study or application. Possessed of this notion, he determined to take the young mendicant under his own tutorage and instruction. In consequence of which, he hoped he should, in a few weeks, be able to produce her in company, as an accomplished young lady of uncommon wit, and an excellent understanding."

== First productions ==
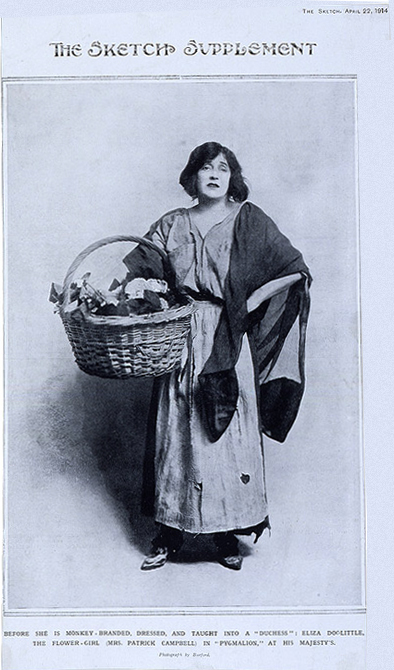
A Sketch Magazine illustration of Mrs Patrick Campbell as Eliza Doolittle from 22 April 1914. Shaw wrote the part of Eliza expressly for Campbell, who played opposite Herbert Beerbohm Tree as Henry Higgins.

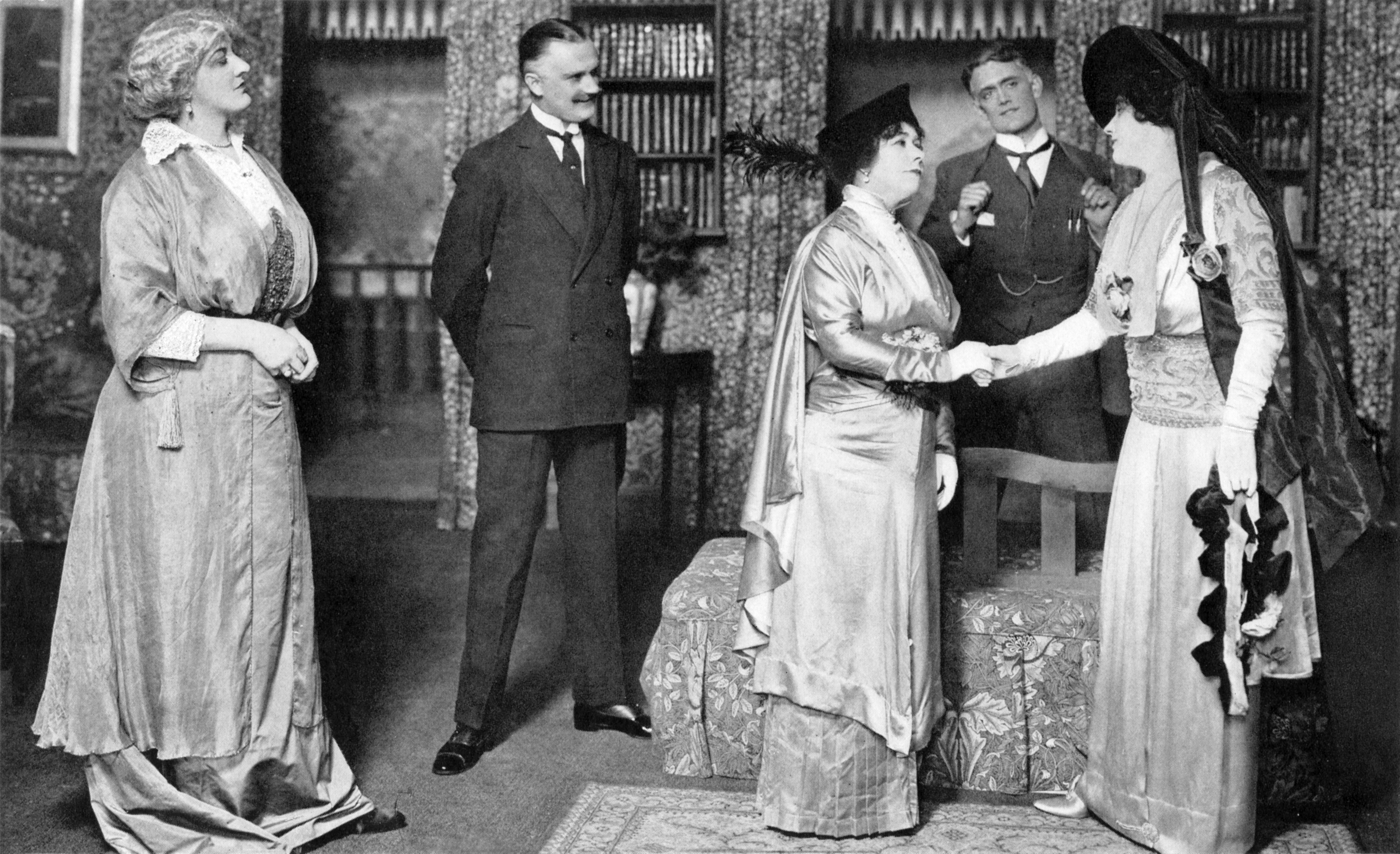
After creating the role of Colonel Pickering in the London production, Philip Merivale (second from right) played Henry Higgins opposite Mrs Patrick Campbell (right) when Pygmalion was taken to Broadway (1914)

Shaw wrote the play in early 1912 and read it to the actress Mrs Patrick Campbell in June. She came on board almost immediately, but her mild nervous breakdown contributed to the delay of a London production. Pygmalion premièred at the Hofburg Theatre in Vienna on 16 October 1913, in a German translation by Shaw's Viennese literary agent and acolyte, Siegfried Trebitsch.

Its first New York production opened on 24 March 1914 at the German-language Irving Place Theatre starring Hansi Arnstaedt as Eliza. It opened in London on 11 April 1914, at Sir Herbert Beerbohm Tree's His Majesty's Theatre, with Campbell as Eliza and Tree as Higgins, and ran for 118 performances. Shaw directed the actors through tempestuous rehearsals, often punctuated by at least one of the two storming out of the theatre in a rage.

The cast for the West End production was:

- Henry Higgins – Herbert Tree
- Colonel Pickering – Philip Merivale
- Freddy Eynsford-Hill – Algernon Greig
- Alfred Doolittle – Edmund Gurney
- A Bystander – Roy Byford
- Another One – Alexander Sarner
- Eliza Doolittle – Mrs Patrick Campbell
- Mrs Eynsford-Hill – Carlotta Addison
- Miss Eynsford-Hill – Margaret Busse
- Mrs Higgins – Rosamond Mayne-Young
- Mrs Pearce – Geraldine Oliffe
- Parlourmaid – Irene Delisse

Carlotta Addison died in June and was replaced as Mrs Eynsford-Hill by Alma Murray.

== Plot ==
=== Act One ===
On a rainy summer evening at Covent Garden in London, various pedestrians seek shelter under the portico of St. Paul's Church. Among them are a mother and daughter in evening dress - Mrs Eynsford-Hill and Clara - waiting for Clara's brother Freddy to secure a taxicab. Freddy returns unsuccessful after an extensive search and is dispatched once more by the impatient women. In his haste, he collides with a young flower girl, scattering her violets. Mrs Eynsford-Hill provides the girl with sixpence in compensation.

An elderly gentleman in evening attire then takes shelter. The flower girl attempts to sell him a bloom. A bystander draws attention to a man who has been recording the conversation in a notebook. The flower girl, fearing the note-taker to be a police informant who might compromise her respectability, becomes agitated. The note-taker calms the gathering and proceeds to identify the geographic origins of several individuals solely from their speech patterns, correctly placing the flower girl in Lisson Grove and the elderly gentleman in a sequence of locations including Cheltenham, Harrow, Cambridge, and India.

As the rain ceases, Mrs Eynsford-Hill and Clara depart on foot. The note-taker and the elderly gentleman introduce themselves: the former is Henry Higgins, a specialist in phonetics and author of a universal alphabet; the latter is Colonel Pickering, a student of Indian dialects who has travelled expressly to meet Higgins. The two men arrange to continue their acquaintance. Higgins asserts that, through phonetic training, he could enable the flower girl to pass as a duchess within three months. Before leaving with Pickering, he deposits a quantity of coins in her basket.

Freddy reappears with a taxicab, only to discover that his mother and sister have already gone. The flower girl engages the vehicle and directs it first, for effect, toward Buckingham Palace before instructing the driver to convey her to her modest lodging in Angel Court, Drury Lane. Upon arrival, she counts her unexpected gains and retires to bed.

=== Act Two ===
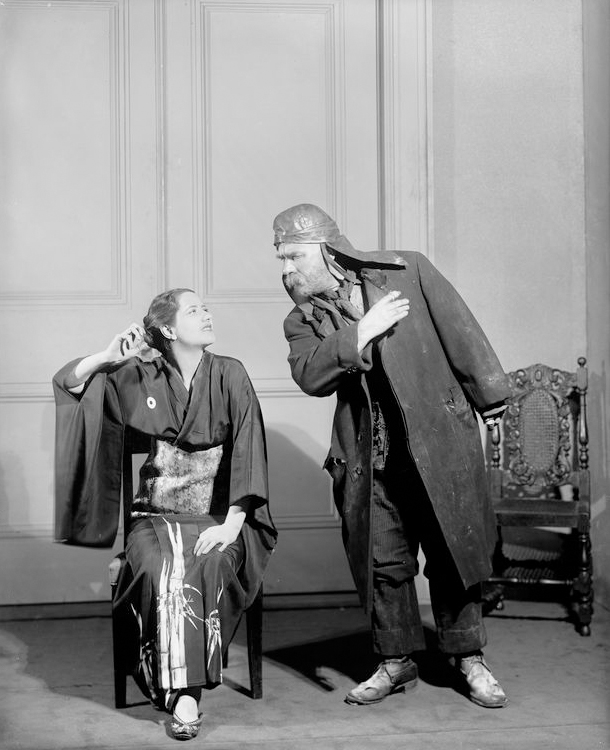
Lynn Fontanne (Eliza) and Henry Travers (Alfred Doolittle) in the Theatre Guild production of Pygmalion (1926)

The next morning, in Higgins's laboratory at his residence in Wimpole Street, Higgins and Pickering examine phonetic apparatus and discuss the science of speech. Mrs Pearce, the housekeeper, announces the arrival of a young woman, the flower girl they encountered the previous evening. Identifying herself as Eliza Doolittle, she requests instruction in refined speech so that she may secure employment in a flower shop rather than sell flowers on the street, offering one shilling per lesson. Higgins initially dismisses her as of no further phonetic interest, but Pickering proposes a wager: he will cover all expenses of the experiment if Higgins succeeds in training Eliza to pass as a duchess at an ambassador's garden party within six months. Intrigued by the challenge and by Eliza's pronounced Cockney dialect, Higgins accepts. He instructs Mrs Pearce to bathe and reclothe the girl at once, treating the undertaking as a scientific project.

Mrs Pearce expresses practical and moral reservations concerning Eliza's welfare, family circumstances, and future prospects once the experiment concludes. Higgins remains largely indifferent to these considerations, regarding Eliza primarily as material for linguistic study. After some resistance, Eliza is compelled to bathe and is provided with clean attire. During this interval, Pickering seeks assurance that Higgins will behave honorably toward their pupil; Higgins affirms that pupils are regarded as sacred. Mrs Pearce further admonishes Higgins regarding his habitual language and personal manners, which she deems unsuitable for the girl's presence.

Alfred Doolittle, Eliza's father and a dustman, then arrives. He first appears to demand his daughter's return, but soon reveals that he seeks financial compensation for relinquishing her. He describes himself as one of the "undeserving poor" and argues that middle-class morality systematically disadvantages men of his sort. After a rhetorical exchange, Higgins presents him with five pounds, which Doolittle accepts with the declaration that the sum will be spent promptly rather than saved. Eliza reappears, thoroughly cleansed and dressed in a Japanese kimono. Her transformation astonishes both her father and the two gentlemen. After Doolittle departs, Eliza shows growing awareness of her altered appearance and circumstances, and Higgins and Pickering acknowledge the formidable task they have undertaken.

=== Act Three ===
At the residence of Higgins's mother on Chelsea Embankment, Higgins arrives uninvited during her regular afternoon reception and informs her of his progress with Eliza. He has arranged for Eliza to attend the gathering as a preliminary test of her ability to pass in polite society, restricting her conversation to the weather and matters of health. The visitors are the Eynsford-Hills, followed by Pickering. Eliza is elegantly attired and speaks with precise and refined pronunciation. She conducts herself with outward composure and makes a favourable first impression. When the conversation turns to health, however, her recounting of an aunt's death, which contains references to possible foul play and alcoholism, reveals both her original social background and residual habits of speech. Her utterance of the phrase "not bloody likely" upon her departure causes marked consternation among the company; Clara subsequently adopts the expression as fashionable. After the guests depart, Mrs Higgins confronts her son and Pickering with the experiment's complications, particularly the question of Eliza's future once her linguistic training is complete. The two men remain absorbed in the technical success of their undertaking and dismiss her concerns.

Later, Eliza appears in full evening dress with Higgins and Pickering at a formal reception at a London embassy. A former pupil of Higgins named Nepommuck, acting as an interpreter, examines her speech and concludes that she is a Hungarian of royal blood, precisely because her English is too perfect to be that of a native; the hostess and other guests accept this assessment. Eliza thus succeeds in passing as a person of high rank, thereby fulfilling the terms of the wager between Higgins and Pickering.

=== Act Four ===
One midnight in Higgins's laboratory, Higgins and Pickering return from a series of engagements that included a garden party, a dinner, and the opera. They are relieved that the wager has been won and that the lengthy effort is finished, regarding the social obligations as tedious and artificial. Eliza, still in full evening attire, remains silent and largely disregarded while the two men discuss the day's events and prepare to retire. Eliza retrieves Higgins's slippers and places them before him without comment. After Pickering withdraws, she loses her composure and hurls the slippers at Higgins. She accuses him of indifference to her fate now that the experiment has succeeded and demands to know what is to become of her. Higgins, surprised by her outburst, treats the matter lightly. He suggests that she might marry or that Pickering could establish her in a florist's shop, and he fails to recognize the depth of her distress. Eliza then inquires whether the clothes and accessories she wears belong to her or to Pickering, noting that her original garments were destroyed. She removes and returns the hired jewels and a ring that Higgins had purchased for her. Higgins, chucking the ring into the fireplace, is offended at what he regards as her ingratitude and angrily departs. Left alone, Eliza feels a brief sense of triumph before retrieving the ring.

=== Act Five ===
The next morning, Higgins and Pickering arrive at Mrs Higgins's residence in considerable agitation, having discovered that Eliza left Wimpole Street during the night and having informed the police of her disappearance. Mrs Higgins criticizes their conduct and their presumption in treating Eliza as property. Alfred Doolittle enters, transformed in appearance and circumstances. An American philanthropist, acting upon a casual recommendation once made by Higgins, has bequeathed him an annual income of three thousand pounds on the condition that he lecture for a moral reform organization. Doolittle laments that the bequest has destroyed his former independence as one of the undeserving poor and has subjected him to the constraints of middle-class respectability. He is on his way to marry Eliza's stepmother at St. George's, Hanover Square.

Mrs Higgins discloses that Eliza is upstairs and recounts her sense of having been disregarded after the successful conclusion of the experiment. Eliza then appears, composed and self-possessed. She expresses gratitude to Pickering for the courtesy that first gave her self-respect, while observing that Higgins continues to regard her merely as the product of his instruction. She agrees to attend her father's wedding. After the others depart for the ceremony, Higgins and Eliza remain. She refuses to resume a subordinate role in his household and asserts her intention to maintain her independence, whether by teaching phonetics or by marrying Freddy. Higgins acknowledges that he has grown accustomed to her presence and will miss her, yet he declines to alter his manner or to offer conventional affection. He expresses satisfaction at her newfound strength of character, and Eliza leaves with dignity, declining to perform a list of errands for him. Left alone, Higgins self-assuredly chuckles at the idea of Eliza marrying Freddy.

== Critical reception ==
The play was well received by critics in major cities following its premieres in Vienna, London, and New York. The initial release in Vienna garnered several reviews describing the show as a positive departure from Shaw's usual dry and didactic style. The Broadway première in New York was praised in terms of both plot and acting, and the play was described as "a love story with brusque diffidence and a wealth of humour." Reviews of the production in London were slightly less positive. The Telegraph noted that the play was deeply diverting, with interesting mechanical staging, although the critic ultimately found the production somewhat shallow and overly lengthy. The Times, however, praised both the characters and the actors (especially Sir Herbert Beerbohm Tree as Higgins and Mrs Patrick Campbell as Eliza) and the "unconventional" ending.

== Ending ==
Pygmalion was the most broadly appealing of all Shaw's plays. But popular audiences, looking for pleasant entertainment with big stars in a West End venue, wanted a "happy ending" for the characters they liked so well, as did some critics. During the 1914 run, Tree changed the ending without telling Shaw, telling him "My ending makes money; you ought to be grateful". The playwright replied, "Your ending is damnable; you ought to be shot". Shaw remained sufficiently irritated to add a postscript essay to the 1916 print edition, "What Happened Afterwards", for inclusion with subsequent editions, in which he explained why it was impossible for the story to end with Higgins and Eliza getting married.

Shaw continued to protect what he saw as the play's, and Eliza's, integrity by protecting the last scene. For at least some performances during the 1920 revival, Shaw adjusted the ending in a way that underscored the Shavian message. In an undated note to Mrs Campbell he wrote,

When Eliza emancipates herself – when Galatea comes to life – she must not relapse. She must retain her pride and triumph to the end. When Higgins takes your arm on 'consort battleship' you must instantly throw him off with implacable pride; and this is the note until the final 'Buy them yourself.' He will go out on the balcony to watch your departure; come back triumphantly into the room; exclaim 'Galatea!' (meaning that the statue has come to life at last); and – curtain. Thus he gets the last word; and you get it too.

(This ending, however, is not included in any print version of the play.)

Shaw fought against a Higgins–Eliza happy-ending pairing as late as 1938. He sent the 1938 film version's producer, Gabriel Pascal, a concluding sequence that he felt offered a fair compromise: a tender farewell scene between Higgins and Eliza, followed by one showing Freddy and Eliza happy in their greengrocery-cum-flower shop. Only at the sneak preview did he learn that Pascal had finessed the question of Eliza's future with a slightly ambiguous final scene in which Eliza returns to the house of a sadly musing Higgins and self-mockingly quotes her previous self announcing, "I washed my face and hands before I come, I did".

== Different versions ==
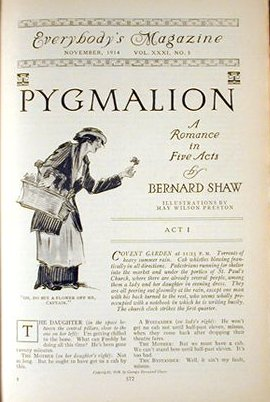
First American (serialized) publication, Everybody's Magazine, November 1914

There are two main versions of the play in circulation. One is based on the earlier version, first published in 1914; the other is a later version that includes several sequences revised by Shaw, first published in 1941. Therefore, different editions of the play omit or add certain lines. For instance, the Project Gutenberg version published online, which is transcribed from an early version, does not include Eliza's exchange with Mrs Pearce in Act II, the scene with Nepommuck in Act III, or Higgins' famous declaration to Eliza, "Yes, you squashed cabbage-leaf, you disgrace to the noble architecture of these columns, you incarnate insult to the English language! I could pass you off as the Queen of Sheba!" – a line so famous that it is now retained in nearly all productions of the play, including the 1938 film version of Pygmalion as well as in the stage and film versions of My Fair Lady.

The co-director of the 1938 film, Anthony Asquith, had seen Mrs Campbell in the 1920 revival of Pygmalion and noticed that she spoke the line, "It's my belief as how they done the old woman in." He knew "as how" was not in Shaw's text, but he felt it added colour and rhythm to Eliza's speech, and liked to think that Mrs Campbell had ad libbed it herself. Eighteen years later he added it to Wendy Hiller's line in the film.

In the original play Eliza's test is met at an ambassador's garden party, offstage. For the 1938 film Shaw and co-writers replaced that exposition with a scene at an embassy ball; Nepommuck, the blackmailing translator spoken about in the play, is finally seen, but his name is updated to Aristid Karpathy – named so by Gabriel Pascal, the film's Hungarian producer, who also made sure that Karpathy mistakes Eliza for a Hungarian princess. In My Fair Lady he became Zoltan Karpathy.

The 1938 film also introduced the famous pronunciation exercises "the rain in Spain stays mainly in the plain" and "In Hertford, Hereford, and Hampshire, hurricanes hardly ever happen". Neither of these appears in the original play. Shaw's screen version of the play as well as a new print version incorporating the new sequences he had added for the film script were published in 1941. Many of the scenes that were written for the films were separated by asterisks, and explained in a "Note for Technicians" section.

== Influence ==
Pygmalion remains Shaw's most popular play. The play's widest audiences know it as the inspiration for the highly romanticized 1956 musical and 1964 film My Fair Lady.

Eliza's line "Walk? Not bloody likely!" is the play's most famous line and, for many years after the play's debut, use of the word 'bloody' was known as a pygmalion; Mrs Campbell was considered to have risked her career by speaking the line onstage.

Pygmalion has transcended cultural and language barriers since its first production. The British Library contains "images of the Polish production...; a series of shots of a wonderfully Gallicised Higgins and Eliza in the first French production in Paris in 1923; a fascinating set for a Russian production of the 1930s. There was no country which didn't have its own 'take' on the subjects of class division and social mobility, and it's as enjoyable to view these subtle differences in settings and costumes as it is to imagine translators wracking their brains for their own equivalent of 'Not bloody likely'."

Joseph Weizenbaum named his chatterbot computer program ELIZA after the character Eliza Doolittle.

== Notable productions ==
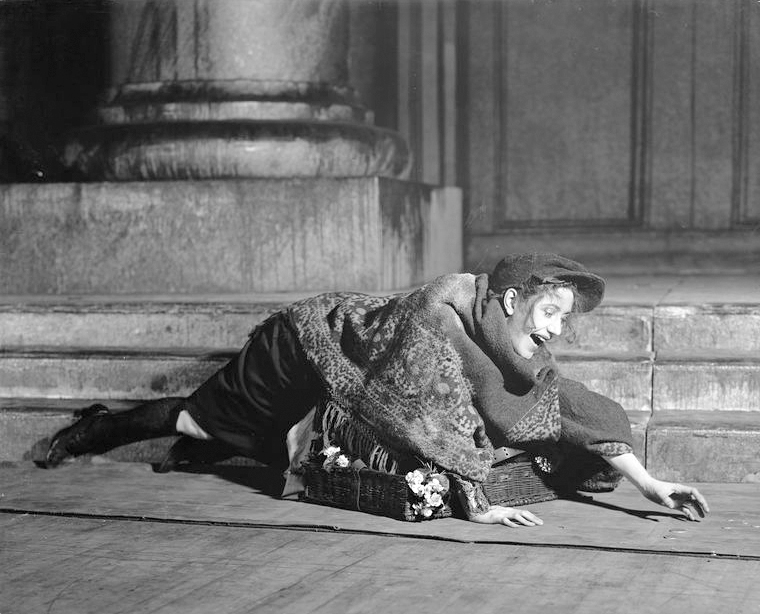
Lynn Fontanne as Eliza Doolittle in the Theatre Guild production of Pygmalion (1926)

- 1914: Sir Herbert Beerbohm Tree and Mrs Patrick Campbell at His Majesty's Theatre
- 1914: Philip Merivale and Mrs Patrick Campbell at three Broadway theatres [Park, Liberty, and Wallack's]
- 1920: C. Aubrey Smith and Mrs Patrick Campbell at the Aldwych Theatre
- 1926: Reginald Mason and Lynn Fontanne at the Guild Theatre (USA)
- 1936: Ernest Thesiger and Wendy Hiller at the Festival Theatre, Malvern
- 1937: Robert Morley and Diana Wynyard at the Old Vic Theatre
- 1945: Raymond Massey and Gertrude Lawrence at the Ethel Barrymore Theatre (USA)
- 1947: Alec Clunes and Brenda Bruce at the Lyric Theatre, Hammersmith
- 1953: John Clements and Kay Hammond at the St James's Theatre, London
- 1965: Ian White and Jane Asher at the Watford Palace Theatre
- 1974: Alec McCowen and Diana Rigg at the Albery Theatre, London
- 1984: Peter O'Toole and Jackie Smith-Wood at the Shaftesbury Theatre, London
- 1987: Peter O'Toole and Amanda Plummer at the Plymouth Theatre (USA)
- 1992: Alan Howard and Frances Barber at the Royal National Theatre, London
- 1997: Roy Marsden and Carli Norris (who replaced Emily Lloyd early in rehearsals) at the Albery Theatre, London
- 2007: Tim Pigott-Smith and Michelle Dockery at the Old Vic Theatre, London
- 2007: Jefferson Mays and Claire Danes at American Airlines Theatre (USA)
- 2010: Simon Robson and Cush Jumbo at the Royal Exchange Theatre, Manchester
- 2011: Rupert Everett (later Alistair McGowan) and Kara Tointon at the Garrick Theatre, London
- 2011: Risteárd Cooper and Charlie Murphy at the Abbey Theatre, Dublin
- 2023 Bertie Carvel and Patsy Ferran at The Old Vic Theatre, London
- 2025 Mark Evans and Synnøve Karlsen at Theater Row, New York Produced by Gingold Theatrical Group.

== Adaptations ==
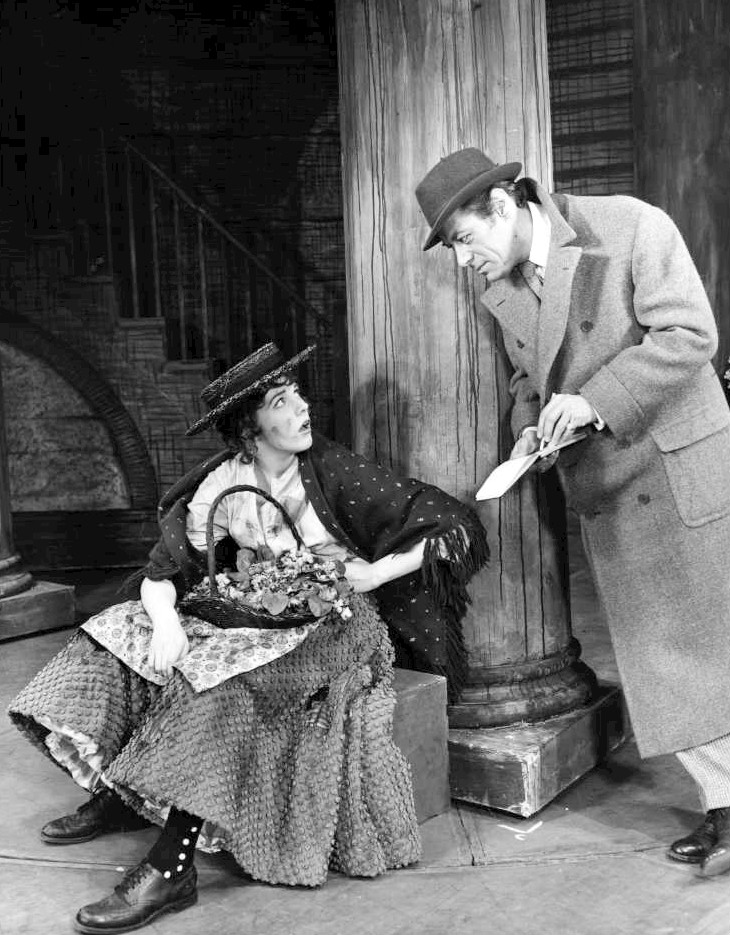
Julie Andrews as flower girl Eliza Doolittle meets Rex Harrison as Professor Henry Higgins in the 1956 musical adaptation of Pygmalion, My Fair Lady.

=== Stage ===
- My Fair Lady (1956), the Broadway musical by Lerner and Loewe (based on the 1938 film), starring Rex Harrison as Higgins and Julie Andrews as Eliza.
- Pygmalion (2024), a new stage adaption from Award Winning Writer/Director Chris Hawley, for Blackbox Theatre Company. The show toured the South of England during Summer 2024.

=== Film ===
- Pygmalion (1935), a German film adaptation by Shaw and others, starring Gustaf Gründgens as Higgins and Jenny Jugo as Eliza. Directed by Erich Engel.
- Hoi Polloi (1935), a short feature starring The Three Stooges comedy team. To win a bet, a professor attempts to transform the Stooges into gentlemen.
- Pygmalion (1937), a Dutch film adaptation, starring Johan De Meester as Higgins and Lily Bouwmeester as Elisa. Directed by Ludwig Berger.
- Pygmalion (1938), a British film adaptation by Shaw and others, starring Leslie Howard as Higgins and Wendy Hiller as Eliza.
- Kitty (1945), a film based on the novel of the same name by Rosamond Marshall (published in 1943). A broad interpretation of the Pygmalion story line, the film tells the rags-to-riches story of a young guttersnipe Cockney girl.
- My Fair Lady (1964), a film version of the musical starring Audrey Hepburn as Eliza and Rex Harrison as Higgins.
- Educating Rita (1983): British comedy-drama film starring Michael Caine and Julie Walters
- Can't Buy Me Love (1987): a teenage romantic comedy reversing gender roles starring Patrick Dempsey and Amanda Peterson.
- She's All That (1999): a modern, teenage take on Pygmalion.
- Love Don't Cost a Thing (2003) a remake of the 1987 Can't Buy Me Love which is also an adaptation.
- The Duff (2015): based on the novel of the same name by Kody Keplinger, which in turn is a modern teenage adaption of Pygmalion.
- He's All That (2021): a Netflix Original movie that's a gender-swap retelling of the 1999 teen comedy; featuring Addison Rae, Rachael Leigh Cook, and Matthew Lillard.

=== Television ===
- A 1948 BBC TV version starring Margaret Lockwood as Eliza and Ralph Michael as Higgins.
- A 1963 Hallmark Hall of Fame production of Pygmalion, starring Julie Harris as Eliza and James Donald as Higgins.
- Pigmalião 70, a 1970 Brazilian telenovela, starring Sérgio Cardoso and Tônia Carrero.
- Pygmalion (1973), a BBC Play of the Month version starring James Villiers as Higgins and Lynn Redgrave as Eliza.
- Pygmalion (1981), a film version starring Twiggy as Eliza and Robert Powell as Higgins.
- Pygmalion (1983), an adaptation starring Peter O'Toole as Higgins and Margot Kidder as Eliza.
- The Makeover, a 2013 Hallmark Hall of Fame modern adaptation of Pygmalion, starring Julia Stiles and David Walton and directed by John Gray.
- Selfie, a 2014 television sitcom on ABC, starring Karen Gillan and John Cho.
- Classic Alice, a webseries, aired a 10-episode adaptation on YouTube, starring Kate Hackett and Tony Noto in 2014.
- Totalmente Demais, a 2015 Brazilian telenovela, starring Juliana Paes, Marina Ruy Barbosa, and Fábio Assunção.

The BBC has broadcast radio adaptations at least twice, in 1986 directed by John Tydeman and in 2021 directed by Emma Harding.

Non–English language

- Pigmalió, an adaptation by Joan Oliver into Catalan. Set in 1950s Barcelona, it was first staged in Sabadell in 1957 and has had other stagings since.
- Ti Phulrani, an adaptation by Pu La Deshpande in Marathi. The plot follows Pygmalion closely but the language features are based on Marathi.
- Santu Rangeeli, an adaptation by Madhu Rye and Pravin Joshi in Gujarati.
- سيدتي الجميلة (Sayydati El-Gameela, My Fair Lady), a 1969 Egyptian stage adaptation of My Fair Lady starring the comedy duo and then married couple, Fouad el-Mohandes and Shwikar. It was performed and filmed for television at the Alexandria Opera House.
- A 1996 television play in Polish, translated by Kazimierz Piotrowski, directed by Maciej Wojtyszko and performed at Teatr Telewizji (Polish Television studio in Warsaw) by some of the top Polish actors at the time. It has been aired on national TV numerous times since its TV premiere in 1998.
- A 2007 adaptation by Aka Morchiladze and Levan Tsuladze in Georgian performed at the Marjanishvili Theatre in Tbilisi.
- Man Pasand, a 1980 Hindi film starring Dev Anand and directed by Basu Chatterjee.
- Ogo Bodhu Shundori, a 1981 Bengali comedy film starring Uttam Kumar and Ranjit Mallick, and directed by Salil Dutta.
- My Young Auntie, a 1981 Hong Kong action film directed by Lau Kar-Leung.
- Laiza Porko Sushi, a Papiamentu adaptation from writer and artist May Henriquez.
- Gönülcelen, a Turkish series starring Tuba Büyüküstün and Cansel Elcin.
- Δύο Ξένοι, a Greek series starring Nikos Sergianopoulos and Evelina Papoulia.
- Pigumarion (in Japanese), starring Tomohiro Ichikawa as Henry Higgins and Shiho Takano as Eliza Doolittle was performed in 2011 at the Owlspot Theater in Tokyo.
- Pigumarion (in Japanese), starring Takahiro Hira as Henry Higgins and Satomi Ishihara as Eliza Doolittle was performed in 2013 at the New National Theater in Tokyo.

== In popular culture ==
=== Films ===
- The First Night of Pygmalion (1972), a play depicting the backstage tensions during the first British production.
- Willy Russell's 1980 stage comedy Educating Rita and the subsequent film adaptation are similar in plot to Pygmalion.
- Trading Places (1983), a film starring Eddie Murphy and Dan Aykroyd.
- Mannequin (1987), a film starring Andrew McCarthy who designs a mannequin so perfect he falls in love with after she comes to life, played by Kim Cattrall.
- Pretty Woman (1990), a film starring Julia Roberts and Richard Gere.
- Mighty Aphrodite (1995), a film directed by Woody Allen.
- She's All That (1999), a film starring Rachael Leigh Cook and Freddie Prinze Jr.
- Confessions of a Teenage Drama Queen (2004), a film starring Lindsay Lohan where she auditions for a modernized musical version of Pygmalion called "Eliza Rocks".
- Ruby Sparks (2012), a film written by and starring Zoe Kazan explores a writer (played by Paul Dano) who falls in love with his own fictional character who becomes real.

== Awards and nominations ==
=== 1987 Broadway revival ===
Year	Award	Category	Nominee	Result
1987	Tony Award	Best Revival		Nominated
1987	Tony Award	Best Actress in a Play	Amanda Plummer	Nominated
