= Edgar Hernandez =

Edgar Hernandez (or Édgar Hernández, etc.) may refer to:

- Edgar Hernandez, (alleged, but not confirmed) patient zero in the 2009 swine flu pandemic
- Édgar Hernández (racewalker) (born 1977), Mexican race walker
- Édgar Hernández Cabrera (born 1982), Mexican footballer
- Édgar Hernández Umaña, Guatemalan deputy interior minister, killed with Minister Vinicio Gómez in 2008
- Édgar Hernández (footballer, born 1982), Mexican football goalkeeper
- Édgar Melitón Hernández (born 1982), Mexican football goalkeeper
- Édgar Hernández (footballer, born 1987), Spanish football forward
- Edgar Hernandez, American P.O.W in 2003 Invasion of Iraq
