= Eleni Rantou =

Greek actress and screenwriter (born 1963)

- Ελένη Ράντου
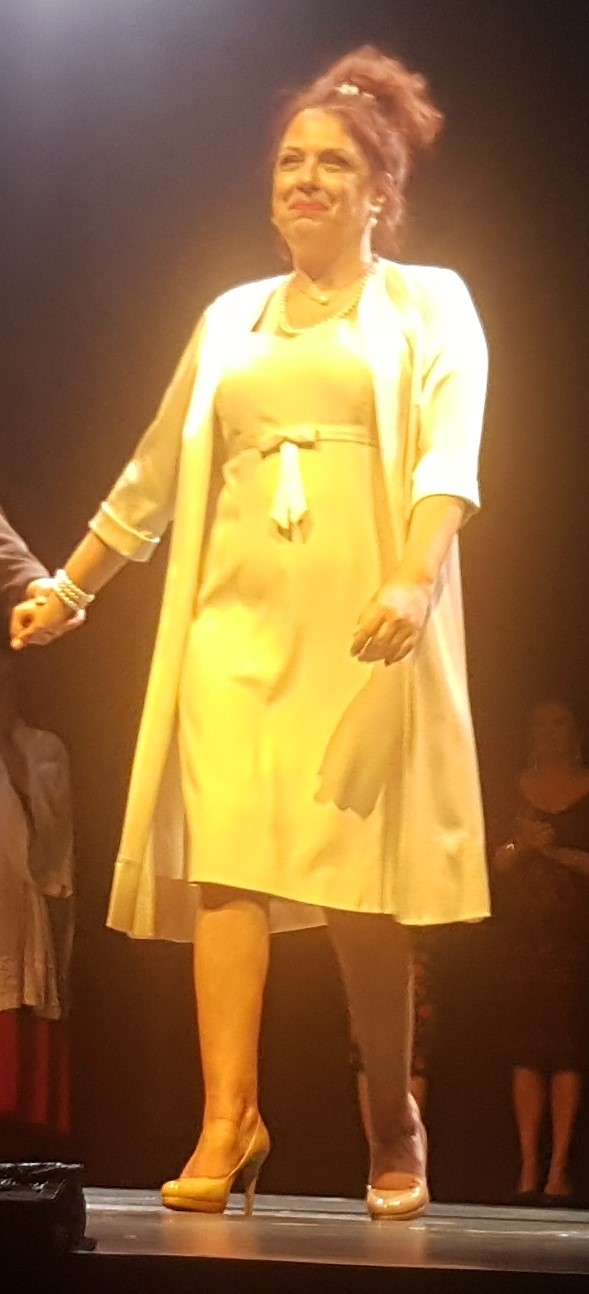
- Born: 12 November 1963 (age 62); Aigaleo, Greece
- Citizenship: Greece
- Education: National Theatre of Greece Drama School; National and Kapodistrian University of Athens
- Occupations: Actress; screenwriter; theatrical producer
- Years active: 1983–present
- Spouse: Vasilis Papakonstantinou (m. 1994)
- Children: 1

Eleni Rantou (Greek: Ελένη Ράντου; born 12 November 1963) is a Greek actress, screenwriter, and theatrical producer. She was born in Aigaleo, an Athens suburb, and is a graduate of the National Theater of Greece. She initially participated in TV shows of the Greek national television in the '80s, and rose to stardom through TV series in which she co-starred and in many cases co-edited the script. She is married to Greek rock star Vasilis Papakonstantinou. Their daughter Nikoleta was born in 1995. She is currently head of the "Diana" theater. In 2009 she prepared a new comedy show in "Diana" theater that later continued as a TV comedy series Ergazomeni Gynaika.

== Early career ==
Her TV debut was in 1983, when she was 20 years old, through the TV show "Ouranio Toxo"(Rainbow) in which she had a starring role. In the same year she also appeared in the TV show "I Kiria Ntoremi" with the role of "Eleftheria". In 1984 she participated in the TV show "Paramithia piso apo ta kagkela" and in 1985 in the tV show "Xaire Taso Karataso. In 1987 she appeared in "Apodrasi" and the next year in the TV show "Stavrosi horis anastasi".

== Filmography ==
=== Television ===
Year	Title	Role	Notes	Reference
1983-1984	The Rainbow	Mina	Series regular, 17 episodes	
1983-1984	Mrs. Doremi	Eleftheria Zikou	3 episodes	
1985	Tales behind bars	Koula	Episode: "The idealist"	
1985-1986	Hello Tasos Karatasos	Kalliopi Karatasou	Series regular, 13 episodes	
1987	The escape	Eleni	Main role, 13 episode	
1988	Atheon Street	Elsa	Main role, 13 episodes	
1989	Who came to our house tonight?		Main role, 8 episodes	
1989	The Workshop		1 episode	
1989-1990	Crucifixion Without Resurrection	Maria	Main role, 27 episodes	
1990-1992	Not the Ant1 News	Herself (host)	Main role, 80 episodes	
1991	Wrong Angel	Sonia	Episodes: "First disappointment"	
1991-1992	The male cat game	Aliki	Main role, 21 episodes	
1992-1993	Ah Eleni!	Eleni Papanikolaou	Main role, 32 episodes; also writer	
1993	Deside!		1 episode	
1994	Moral Department	Kiki	Episode: "I saw him"	
1995	Moral Department	Olga Ioannou	Episode: "In heaven without return"	
1995-1996	Shampoo	Maira	Main role, 14 episodes; also writer	
1998-2000	Konstantino's & Eleni's	Eleni Vlachaki	Main role, 69 episodes	
2000-2001	What Soul Will You Deliver, You Fool Woman?	Dominique Cesar	Main role, 7 episodes	
2001	Red Circle	Stella	Episode: "By luck"	
2002	Red Circle	Katy	Episode: "Trojan War"	
2003-2004	Saturday-born	Bia Bekou	Main role, 33 episodes	
2005	Safe Sex TV Stories	Anna Triantafyllou	Episode: "Anastasia"	
2005	The Red Suite	Marina Chatzi	Episode: "The bet"	
2009-2010	Working Woman	different roles	Main role, 20 episodes	
2021-2022	Take your jacket	Fouli Danou	Main role, 38 episodes	
2025	Maria became Callas		Upcoming tv series	

=== Film ===
Year	Title	Role	Notes	Ref.
1983	Rematch	nurse	Film debut	
1986	Knock out	Eleni		
1990	16 days moon		Short film	
1990	The last game	Isavella	Videomovie	
2009	I die for you	Zoe	Also writer	

== Theatre ==
- 2000-2002: Mageirevontas me ton Elvis
- 2002-2005: Mama min treheis
- 2005: Eklissiazouses
- 2005-2006: Alli mia votka molotof
- 2006-2008: Nyhta radio...fonon
- 2009-2010: 33 Fores na figeis
- 2011-2014: Katadikos mou
