= Dyo Xenoi =

- Genre: Romance comedy
- Written by: Alexandros Rigas; Dimitris Apostolou
- Directed by: Antonis Aggelopoulos; Andreas Morfonios
- Creative director: Alexandros Rigas
- Starring: Nikos Sergianopoulos; Evelina Papoulia; Ntina Konsta; Chrisoula Diavati; Alexandros Rigas
- Country of origin: Greece
- Original language: Greek
- No. of seasons: 2
- No. of episodes: 59

Production
- Executive producer: Ninos Elmatzioglou
- Producer: Thodoris Kontos
- Production location: Athens
- Cinematography: Themis Mertiris; Panayiotis Kolios
- Editor: Giorgos Litsios
- Running time: 45–65 minutes / episode
- Production company: TV Epsilon

Original release
- Network: Mega Channel
- Release: October 9, 1997 – June 21, 1999

Dιo Xenoi (English: Two Strangers) is the title of a Greek romance comedy television series aired by Mega Channel in the 1997–1999 seasons. The screenplay was written by Alexandros Rigas and Dimitris Apostolou. The series presents the development and evolution of a love affair between a popular and low-educated young woman, TV presenter of light content (Evelina Papoulia), and an ancient drama teacher with intensely haughty principles and introverted personality (Nikos Sergianopoulos). It was one of the most successful series of Greek television and it won the best comedy series award in the "Prosopa" Greek Television Awards in 1998. Since then, it has been shown on repeat every year due to the huge success it experienced. The title of the series is inspired by the lyrics of the song "The Sign" written to music by Marios Tokas and performed by Konstantina and Yiannis Parios.

== Series overview ==
Season	Episodes	Original air date	
Season	Episodes	Premiere	Finale
1	29	9 October 1997	2 June 1998
2	30	6 October 1998	21 June 1999

== Plot ==
=== Season 1 ===
Konstantinos Markoras is a professor of ancient Greek drama who runs a minor theatre workshop. London-educated and cultivated, he is also a serious, snobbish, grumpy introvert who drinks copiously. He lives in Athens, near the Acropolis, with his strong-willed, conservative housekeeper Flora. The family is completed by his widowed mother Deni, a wealthy socialite, flighty but glamorous, sharp and resourceful, with an acerbic wit; she lives with her maid, a Russian named Marouska.

As a favour to Deni's boyfriend, TV channel director Nikiforos, Konstantinos appears on the struggling, lightweight morning show Morning Smile, hosted by Marina Kountouratou, a mostly uneducated and slightly ditzy but cheerful and resilient girl with plenty of street smarts. There is strong and immediate attraction, but their vast differences make Konstantinos and Marina clash fiercely.

Marina is the first to accept her feelings and as a pretense to get closer to Konstantinos schemes to enter his drama workshop, enlisting Deni and her highly intelligent editor and friend Tolis. Though she succeeds on a trial basis, the clashes continue. With time, they start changing each other for the better – while Deni mentors Marina, when she's not comically bickering with Flora over their characters and Konstantinos's girlfriend, Mina.

The clashing culminates in a first kiss he tries to walk back, at which point they almost go their separate ways. After a passionate reunion at Deni's party, Marina returns to the workshop and resolves to make Konstantinos work for her affection, showing significant improvement and almost leaving the school for another teacher, to his fury.

Helped by Tolis, Deni discovers Mina's affair with a singer and tries to blackmail her into leaving Konstantinos, but Flora blackmails Deni into stopping, in turn. Following a watershed moment of a knife attack while rehearsing, Konstantinos and Marina start an affair. While Tolis knows, Deni also finds out, and agrees with Marina to keep her knowledge secret.

The couple begin having getaways and rehearsing intensively for Sophocles's Antigone. Smelling a rat, Flora quarrels with Konstantinos and temporarily moves in with Deni, driving her crazy. Marina leaves her (unbeknownst to her), serially cheating boyfriend, Lampis, and Deni distracts him away from Konstantinos. Despite their mutual feelings, Konstantinos's teaching zeal and inability to verbalise love enrage Marina. She leaves him and rejects his attempts to reconcile until they end up fighting again. Deni's scheme to reconcile them backfires.

Thinking it's over, Konstantinos proposes to Mina on a whim. Deni tries everything to stop the wedding, to no avail. Though heartbroken, Marina rejects his pleadings to be together, only to find out she's pregnant. Mina finds out too and disappears on the wedding day.

=== Season 2 ===
Tolis convinces Marina to not have an abortion, but she forces him to keep the pregnancy secret. Flora does her mightiest to find Mina, even ending up on TV, but she won't return.

Deni strongarms her boyfriend Nikiforos into making her producer of a new series in the TV channel he presides over. She ropes Konstantinos in as director, and his drama students as the cast. The screenwriter, Mara, immediately pursues Konstantinos and he eventually starts giving in. Konstantinos and Deni bicker endlessly over expenses and casting.

As Marina feels pressured by time and publicity, she and Tolis recruit Aias, an obscure actor, to pose as her boyfriend and father of the child. While Deni is escorting Flora to Moscow for an operation, Marina's news breaks. The Markoras family eventually believe her, and are furious. Marina buckles and tells Deni the truth.

Due to the pregnancy, Marina's mother Zoítsa visits from the country. Smart and indomitable, she quickly figures everyone out and helps Konstantinos realise the truth. Tolis is summoned for his army service. The former Markoras chauffeur, Flora's one-time fiancé Menios returns to Greece, and they reunite. Konstantinos and Marina also reconcile, as he's delighted with the pregnancy.

After mistaking his sergeant's hints, Tolis is blackmailed with his homosexuality into promoting his girlfriend, singer Haroula. Only for him and Haroula to fall for each other. Shooting for the TV series picks up pace, and Konstantinos is exhausted by Deni's cheapness. Deni finds out Menios is a trafficker and brothel owner, and threatens him to clean up his act.

Marina is reluctant to commit to Konstantinos due to his chronic indecisiveness. He antagonises Aias, who also pursues her. Tolis and Haroula are found out by the sergeant; they avoid his ire, but ultimately break up. Tolis is discharged. Deni and Flora narrowly escape Menios's enemies; he promises to stop, but keeps going, even hiring Marouska as a dancer. The police wiretap Konstantinos's home and arrest Menios at his and Flora's engagement party.

Marina gives birth to twins, a girl and a boy, with Zoítsa, Konstantinos and Deni present. Aias, who thinks he has a real chance, finally catches Marina and Konstantinos in the act. Marina pressures Konstantinos to come clean about the kids, and he almost does during a reception, but backs out, disappointing her. He starts therapy to get over his traumatic, bizarre childhood, and they return to their old rivalry. He turns to Mara, she to Aias.

During a brief break-up with Nikiforos, Deni too dates another man, a wealthy businessman from abroad. Menios trial goes badly despite Deni's and Flora's efforts. The TV series finally airs and is a flop. Plotting to reunite the lovers, Tolis and Deni bring Marina in as a guest star. She's a success, the press praising her acting skill. Menios is sentenced.

Tired of the instability, Marina proposes to Aias. Konstantinos, desperate, confesses to Deni. Marina rebuffs all attempts from him and Tolis to change her mind. Deni and Flora mastermind Menios's flight from prison and stage a hostage situation, inadvertently trapping Konstantinos. Marina marries Aias.

Still, Konstantinos doesn't give up. He affirms his love for Marina to his family, and while they create a diversion, races to stop her before the honeymoon. With a final declaration of love and apology, he wins her and their children back, forever.

== Cast and characters ==
- Nikos Sergianopoulos as Konstantinos Markoras (season 1–2): a rather unsuccessful ancient Greek drama teacher, well-read but haughty, gruff, and almost misanthropic. He drinks heavily and has a love-hate relationship with his family.
- Evelina Papoulia as Marina Kountouratou (season 1–2): a morning TV show host, not very educated but vivacious, bold to the point of brazenness and with plenty street-smarts.
- Ntina Konsta as Deni Markora (season 1–2): Konstantinos's widowed mother, a wealthy socialite. Seemingly eccentric, she is fiercely intelligent, witty, and sometimes domineering. She regularly bickers with Flora and Marouska, and is a diehard fan of Panathinaikos.
- Chrisoula Diavati as Flora Barbaritsa (season 1–2): Konstantinos's housekeeper and second mother, once the entire family's housekeeper. Cunning, perceptive and with strong traditional beliefs, she equally supports and hectors Konstantinos.
- Alexandros Rigas as Tolis Sideratos (season 1–2): Marina's editor, best friend and confidant. Smart, resourceful and loyal, he often solves her and others' troubles with his cunning. Tolis is openly gay and has several brief flirtations, though he also falls, to his shock, for a woman.
- Calliope Tahtsoglou as Marouska (season 1–2):Deni's live-in maid, an illegal immigrant from Russia. While they don't speak each other's languages, she and Deni somehow understand each other perfectly.
- Alexandra Paleologou as Mina Aggelopoulou (season 1): Konstantinos's girlfriend, an attorney. Serious like him, she is self-possessed and clever.
- Odysseas Stamoulis as Petros Stavrou (season 1): Konstantinos's friend, co-runner of their workshop. Easygoing and charming, he also offers selfless and good counsel.
- Dimitris Tsoutsis as Nikiforos Kasimatis (season 1–2):a TV station director, Deni's longtime boyfriend. Sometimes gullible, he is also sly, proud and deeply attached to Deni, though he might flirt with others.
- Rania Ioannidou as Marianthi Mantouna (season 1–2): Flora's neighbour, friend and sidekick. She is sweet and good-natured, but naïve and often prone to blunders.
- Themis Manesis as Menios Tsaparas (season 2): the former Markoras family chauffeur and Flora's fiancé, a perennial conman, brothel owner and trafficker. He presents as affable and salt-of-the-earth to hide his slyness and shady activities, though he does love the family and especially Flora.
- Nikos Sideris as Lambis (season 1) : Marina's boyfriend, a mechanic. Coarse, with more brawn than brains, he is mostly preoccupied with sex. He has enough cunning to cheat constantly and go undetected.
- Aias Manthopoulos as fictionalised version of himself (season 2) : an obscure actor, recruited by Tolis and Marina to play father to her child. Polite and patient, to the point of some considering him timid, he works slyly and quietly to conquer her for real.
- Dimitra Papadima as Mara Theofanous (season 2) : the screenwriter in Deni and Konstantinos's TV series and later his girlfriend. Able to stand her ground, patient and supportive, though mostly oblivious of Konstantinos's affair – unlike Mina.

== Trivia ==
=== Development ===
After the completion of the writing collaboration between Alexandros Rigas and Lefteris Papapetrou in the series Dolce Vita, Rigas began his collaboration with Apostolou. In early 1997, the design and production of the new series titled "Two Strangers" began which was to be shown at Mega. The lead cast was initially framed by Eleni Kourkoula in the role of Marina, Grigoris Valtinos in the role of Konstantinos, Nonika Galinea in the role of Deni and Dina Konsta in the role of Flora, which changed soon.

In the first episode –at the end of the beginning titles– the contributors dedicate the series to Aliki Vougiouklaki, with the characteristic text below: the series "two strangers" is dedicated to a woman who taught us to believe in fairy tales... Aliki. The series consists of 59 episodes, but only 58 are shown in the channel's reruns, as one of them has not been played before due to some scenes showing Konstantinos bribing Marianthi's granddaughter to secretly call Marina and call her "whore". This resulted in the episode being banned from viewing by N.B.C. repeat indefinitely, or formally cut the controversial scenes (41st episode, 21 December 1998).

The series also aired a telefilm with the synopsis of the series, on the occasion of the third season which never aired. The third season, according to Alexandros Rigas, was scheduled to begin in early October 1999 and would end in 12 episodes just before Christmas.

=== Backstage ===
The first season of the series differs greatly in quality and the line it follows in relation to the second cycle. The huge success it experienced made Mega to have greater demands from the production and creators already in the middle of the first season. From the 23rd episode onwards the duration of the episodes increases to hourly, the directorial pattern changes making it felt through the fast editing that has the speed of the plot to "gallop".

And while the series was preparing for the second season, Evelina Papoulia became pregnant after the shooting of the first season. This resulted in the script being remade and the pregnancy being transferred to Marina's character as well. However, the writing duo have never stated what their initial thoughts were about how the plot would have gone on if Marina had not become pregnant at the time. After this change, there are three retirements: two voluntary, and one... sharp. The first was that of Nikos Sideris judging that the role of Lambis had made its circle in history, and the second resounding was that of Alexandra Paleologou, who chose to leave in order to star in a new series of ANT1. Of course, she stayed for four more episodes so that her role closed with a strong reversal, which eventually left some windows open. The third departure was that of Odysseas Stamoulis, who would continue to participate in the second season of the series as normal. After the 34th episode, Petros's character abruptly disappears, and only a few telephone references are made to his person through Konstantinos. The actor said in an interview that no one from the production or the writers informed him why he was removed from the show.

Although the filming of the second season started early in order to release the actors who will leave and the scenes of Papoulia to take place before her pregnancy proceeds, after the Christmas gap made it difficult to make the filming so that the main plot was put on the back burner, to introduce new stories and as a result the viewers' interest decreased. After giving birth, the actress quickly returned to filming, again catching the pulse. The channel was in the final stage to renew the series for another season, however the demands of the production and the station over those of the actors and contributors left the series finale suspended.

== Episodes ==
=== Season 1 (1997–1998) ===
Air date: Thursday at 9:05pm (episodes 1–12) and Tuesday at 9:15pm (episodes 13–29).

1. 9 October 1997
2. 16 October 1997
3. 23 October 1997
4. 30 October 1997
5. 6 November 1997
6. 13 November 1997
7. 20 November 1997
8. 27 November 1997
9. 4 December 1997
10. 11 December 1997
11. 18 December 1997
12. 25 December 1997
13. 27 January 1998
14. 3 February 1998
15. 10 February 1998
16. 17 February 1998
17. 24 February 1998
18. 3 March 1998
19. 10 March 1998
20. 17 March 1998
21. 24 March 1998
22. 7 April 1998
23. 14 April 1998
24. 28 April 1998
25. 5 May 1998
26. 12 May 1998
27. 19 May 1998
28. 26 May 1998
29. 2 June 1998

=== Season 2 (1998–1999) ===
Air date: Tuesday at 9:50pm (episodes 30–32) and Monday at 9:10pm (episodes 33–46) and at 10:10pm (episodes 47–59).

1. 6 October 1998
2. 13 October 1998
3. 20 October 1998
4. 26 October 1998
5. 2 November 1998
6. 9 November 1998
7. 16 November 1998
8. 23 November 1998
9. 30 November 1998
10. 7 December 1998
11. 14 December 1998
12. 21 December 1998
13. 1 February 1999
14. 8 February 1999
15. 15 February 1999
16. 1 March 1999
17. 8 March 1999
18. 15 March 1999
19. 22 March 1999
20. 29 March 1999
21. 5 April 1999
22. 19 April 1999
23. 26 April 1999
24. 3 May 1999
25. 10 May 1999
26. 17 May 1999
27. 24 May 1999
28. 7 June 1999
29. 14 June 1999
30. 21 June 1999

Media offices	Series created by Alexandros Rigas and Dimitris Apostolou	Next: Ti Psyhi Tha Paradoseis Mori?
