= Evelina Papoulia =

Greek actress and dancer (born 1971)

- Born: 25 March 1971 (age 55); Athens, Greece
- Occupations: Actress, dancer
- Spouses: Giorgos Liantos; Panagiotis Kravvas

Evelina Papoulia (Greek: Εβελίνα Παπούλια; born 25 March 1971) is a Greek actress and dancer. She started her career in 1993 after she finished her studied as an actress and dancer and she decided to come back to Greece. After some years of smaller roles in different successful tv series and theatre plays she rose to fame with the role of Marina Kountouratou in huge MEGA romance hit Two Strangers (1997-1999) starting an a-list lead actress career. She has also appeared in successful films as Safe Sex (1999), One plus One (2000), One time (2001), Brides (2004) and Guilt (2009).

== Career ==
In 1989 she moved to New York City to study dance at The Martha Graham School of Contemporary Dance and acting at The Lee Strasberg Theater Institute. During her time in New York City, she took part in several plays, such as West Side Story (1993), while participating in the Mega Dance Company. Originally she wanted to obtain the American citizenship, but failing to do so she returned to Athens in 1993 and continued working as an actress. Evelina first claimed stardom as the hysterical blond TV persona Marina Kountouratou, who fell in love with a man of classic education, in Dyo Xenoi in 1997.

Her film debut was in the successful Greek film Safe Sex in 1999.

While working on TV shows, she continued her career on stage with plays such as Waiting Till Dark (1999) and the rock musical Hedwig and the Angry Inch.

From 2006 until 2008, she was a judge at the Greek version of So You Think You Can Dance.

== Personal life ==
Papoulia has a daughter named Afroditi-Maria, from her first marriage to George Liantos. In May 2008, she married director Panagiotis Kravvas in Scotland and got divorced in 2008.

== Filmography ==
=== Film ===
Year	Title	Role	Notes	Ref.
1999	Safe Sex	Mary	Film debut	
2000	One plus One	Catherine		
2001	One time	Vaso		
2003	Billy, Gates and a ride	Gely	short film	
2004	Brides	Marion Gibson		
2006	Illustration	TV presenter		
2007	First time godfather	Alex's mother		
2009	Guilt	wife		
2024	Buzzheart	Sandra		
2024	Six		short film	
2025	Fouetté		short film	

=== Television ===
Year	Title	Role	Notes	Reference
1993	Moral Department	Dora Afedaki	Episode: "Plan"	
1993	The Implementation	Sophia Laskaridou	1 episode	
1994	Love and Passion		Episode: "Antigone"	
1994	The Stockbrokers	Dafne Deligiorgi	1 episode	
1994	The Good Mother in Law	Lia Kehayia	5 episodes	
1994	Anatomy of a crime	woman with rashes	Episode: "The third commandment"	
1994	Anatomy of a crime	Claire	Episode: "The Professional"	
1994	Peter and his girls	Renia Koropouli	Episode: "Pythagorean theorem"	
1994-1995	Taurus with Sagitarrius	Katia	Series regular, 32 episodes	
1995	Daring Stories	Liana	Episode: "Maestro"	
1995	Streets of the city	Leda	Episode: "Double game"	
1995-1996	Correct Sophia	Lora Katoumani	Series regular, 16 episodes	
1996	Scorpio	Olga Valtinou	Episode: "Carp"	
1996-1997	Unusual Suspects	Lena	Main role, 35 episodes	
1997-1999	Two Strangers	Marina Koudouratou	Lead role, 59 episodes	
2000-2001	Crescendo	Anna Theologou	Lead role, 20 episodes	
2001	Evelina Papoulia meets Ocean's Eleven	Herself (host)	MEGA TV special	
2001-2002	Nirvana	Aphrodite	Lead role, 26 episodes	
2002	Gulf Grosso		Recurring role, 10 episodes	
2002	Red Circle	Hristina	Episode: "Love died"	
2002-2003	Educating Babis	Julie Variheri	Lead role, 11 episodes	
2003	Almost Never	Eva	1 episode	
2003-2004	Finally you are so bum	Lila	Lead role, 13 episodes	
2004	10th command	Dina	Episode: "A minute later"	
2004	10th command	Despoina	Episode: "Without return"	
2004	10th command	Eleni	Episode: "In deep waters"	
2005	The Red Suite	Artemis	Episode: "Karma"	
2006	10th command	Leda	Episode: "The sleeping queen"	
2006	Honest Cuckolds	Eve	Episode: "The Oriole Cuckolds"	
2006-2008	So You Think You Can Dance	Herself (judge)	Season 1-2	
2007	If you love me	Katerina Marni	Lead role, 52 episodes	
2007-2008	I bought red glasses	Marianna Oikonomou	Lead role, 29 episodes	
2008	Safe Sex TV Stories	Stella Nevi	Episode: "The abduction"	
2008	True Loves	Marianna	Episode: "The beast in the cage"	
2012	My mother's sin	Vagia Kastellanou Spencer	2 episodes (2 unaired)	
2013-2017	Brousko	Daphne Krontira	Lead role, 772 episodes	
2015	10th command	Nina	Episode: "Red"	
2015	10th command	Eleni	Episode: "Alert"	
2017-2019	The Tattoo	Vera Damianou	Lead role, 522 episodes	
2019	MadWalk - The Fashion Music Project	Herself (performance)	TV special	
2019-2020	Home Is	Rania Anagnostou	Lead role, 38 episodes (8 unaired)	
2021-2022	The Sun	Ioanna Galanou	Recurring role, 45 episodes	
2024-2025	Archelaus 5 Str.	Kelly Komontaki	Lead role, 80 episodes	

== Stage ==
=== Theater ===
Production	Year	Theater	Role
My Fair Lady	1993-1994	Aliki Theatre	florist/maid
Some Like it Hot	1994-1995	Theatre Vembo	Olga
West Side Story	1995	Athineon Theatre	Gratsiella
Fiddler on the Roof	1997	Athineon Theatre	Tzeitel
Weigh the Anchors	1997-1998	National Theatre of Greece	different roles
Damons	2013	Pallas Theatre	Loa
I, I and I	2023-2024	Theatre Alambra	Natalie
