= So You Think You Can Dance (Greek TV series) =

Greek TV series

- Created by: Simon Fuller; Nigel Lythgoe
- Presented by: Doukissa Nomikou (3); Vicky Kaya (1-2)
- Judges: Panos Metaxopoulos (1-3); Ivan Svitailo (3); Konstantinos Rigos (3); Eleni Foureira (3); Ioannis Melissanidis (3); Michalis Nalbantis (1-2); Evelina Papoulia (1-2); Jason Roditis (2)
- Countries of origin: Greece; Cyprus
- Original language: Greek
- No. of seasons: 3

Original release
- Network: Mega Channel
- Release: 1 February 2007 – 16 June 2008
- Network: ANT1
- Release: 21 April – 15 July 2017

So You Think You Can Dance is a Greek dance competition show produced and aired by Mega Channel and based on the format of other shows in the So You Think You Can Dance television franchise. The first season was broadcast in 2007 following auditions held in Athens, New York City, Melbourne, Munich, and Cyprus in late 2006. The auditions in the countries outside Greece were aimed at Greeks living abroad. The grand prize of the show was 100,000 euros and a 3-year scholarship to a dance school in London, England. The third season was broadcast live in Greece and Cyprus via Ant1.

== Season 1 ==
Contributors:
Hostess: Vicky Kaya (Βίκυ Καγιά)
Judge 1: Michalis Nalbantis (Μιχάλης Ναλμπάντης)
Judge 2: Evelina Papoulia (Εβελίνα Παπούλια)
Judge 3: Panos Metaxopoulos (Πάνος Μεταξόπουλος)
Choreographer: Maria Anthimidou (Μαρία Ανθυμίδου)
Choreographer: Jeison Roditis (Τζέισον Ροδίτης)
Choreographer: Tonia Kosovitch (Τόνια Κόσοβιτς)
Choreographer: Rea Chantzi (Ρέα Χατζή)
Choreographer: Natalie Fotopoulos (Ναταλία Φωτόπουλος)

Contestants:
Petros Fourniotis (Πέτρος Φουρνιώτης)
Dimitra Zervou (Δήμητρα Ζερβού)
Elpiniki Ioannou (Ελπινίκη Ιωάννου)
Petros Zlatkos (Πέτρος Ζλάτκος)
Smaragda Kalimoukou (Σμαράγδα Καλημούκου)
Panagiota Kariotis (Παναγιώτα Καριώτη)
Loukia Laimou (Λουκία Λαιμού)
Mitch Fistrovic (Μιτς Φιστρόβιτς)
Fanie Michailidou (Φανή Μιχαηλίδου)
Liza Spachi (Λίζα Σπάχη)
Kiki Fotiadi (Κική Φωτιάδη)
Maria Fotiadi (Μαρία Φωτιάδη)
Vana Christaki (Βάνα Χριστάκη)
Loukas Kosmidis (Λουκάς Κοσμίδης)
Pavlos Manogiannakis (Παύλος Μανογιαννάκης)
Tsiago Souarez Da Silva (Τσιάγκο Σουάρεζ Ντα Σίλβα)
Vaggelis Polyzois (Βαγγέλης Πολυζώης)
Jean Pierre Falone Stasinopoulos (Ζαν Πιερ Φαλόνε Στασινόπουλος)
Kostas Torlidakis (Κώστας Τορλιδάκης)
Elias Chatzigeorgiou (Ηλίας Χατζηγεωργίου)

The winner of season one was Loukas Kosmidis (Λουκάς Κοσμίδης).
Top 4: Jean Pierre Falone Stasinopoulos, Fanie Michailidou, Panagiota Kariotis

== Season 2 ==
Contributors:
Hostess:' Vicky Kaya (Βίκυ Καγιά)
Judge 1: Michalis Nalbantis (Μιχάλης Ναλμπάντης)
Judge 2: Evelina Papoulia (Εβελίνα Παπούλια)
Judge 3: Panos Metaxopoulos (Πάνος Μεταξόπουλος)
Judge 4: Jason Roditis (Τζέισον Ροδίτης)
Choreographer: Maria Anthimidou (Μαρία Ανθυμίδου)
Choreographer: Tonia Kosovitch (Τόνια Κόσοβιτς)
Choreographer: Wendy Gibbins (Γουέντι Γκίμπινς)
Choreographer: Natalie Fotopoulos (Ναταλία Φωτόπουλος)

Contestants:
Giannis Mixos (Γιάννης Μίχος)
Giorgos Dagiadas (Γιώργος Νταγιάντας)
Ania Donchenko (Άνια Ντοντσένκο)
Denise Puko (Ντενίζ Πούκο)
Emily Dann (Έμιλυ Νταν)
Fenia Tsikitikou (Φένια Τσικιτίκου)
Chrysa Skordiali (Χρύσα Σκορδιάλη)
Ada Seraidari (Άδα Σεραϊδάρη)
Revo (Ρέβο)
Konstadinos Eleftheriadis (Κωνσταντίνος Ελευθεριάδης)
Rodi Stefanidou (Ροδή Στεφανίδου)
Laura Narges (Λάουρα Νάργες)
Sofia Theodosiou (Σοφία Θεοδοσίου)
Georgette Korizis (Ζορζέτ)
Zoï Tatopoulos (Ζωή Τατόπουλος)
Fani Foka (Φανή Φωκά)
Margarita Kostoglou (Μαργαρίτα Κώστογλου)
Giorgos Kostopoulos (Γιώργος Κωστόπουλος)
Igor Mara Hernandez (Ιγκόρ Μόρα Ερνάντες)
Andreas Ioannou (Αντρέας Ιωάννου)
Elena Tsikitikou (Ελενα Τσικιτίκου)
Anastasios Kanaridis (Αναστάσιος Καναρίδης)

The winner of season two was Elena Tsikitikou (Ελενα Τσικιτίκου).
Top 4: Ania Donchenko, Zoï Tatopoulos, Igor Mara Hernandez

== Season 3 ==
Contributors:
Hostess: Doukissa Nomikou (Δούκισσα Νομικού)
Judge 1: Ivan Svitailo (Ιβάν Σβιτάιλο)
Judge 2: Konstantinos Rigos (Κωνσταντίνος Ρήγος)
Judge 3: Panos Metaxopoulos (Πάνος Μεταξόπουλος)
Judge 4: Eleni Foureira (Ελένη Φουρέιρα)
Judge 5: Ioannis Melissanidis (Ιωάννης Μελισσανίδης)
Choreographer: Bill RoXenos (Μπίλ Ρόξενος)
Choreographer: Courtney Parker (Κόρτνεϊ Πάρκερ)
Choreographer: Zoï Tatopoulos (Ζωή Τατόπουλος)
Choreographer: Alexander Velinov (Αλεξάντερ Βέλινοβ)
Choreographer: Vivi Stamoyli (Βιβή Σταμούλη)
Choreographer: Giorgos Kostopoulos (Γιώργος Κωστόπουλος)

Contestants:
Valantis Rapths (Βαλάντης Ράπτης)
Velma Antrianaki (Βέλμα Ανδριανάκη)
Nefeli Theodotou (Νεφέλη Θεοδότου)
Marios Chatziantonis (Μάριος Χατζηαντώνης)
Paraskevas Theodosiou (Παρασκευάς Θεοδοσίου)
Danah-Stella Aulonith (Δανάη-Στέλλα Αυλωνίτη)
Areth Noti (Αρετή Νότη)
Sofia Tzavellou (Σοφία Τζαβέλλου)
Chrysa Skordiali (Χρύσα Σκορδιαλή)
Marianna Papakonstantinou (Μαριάννα Παπακωνσταντίνου)
Alexandros Beshonges (Αλέξανδρος Πέσογκες)
Xrhstos Ntenths (Χρήστος Ντέντης)
Telis Telikas (Τέλης Τελλάκης)
Aggelos Apostolidis (Άγγελος Αποστολίδης)
Nasta Kontopidi(Νάστα Κοντοπίδη)
Oleksandr Bakharyev (Ολεκ)
Kleio Arvaniti (Κλειώ Αρβανίτη)
Eva Somaraki (Εύα Σωμαρακάκη)
Despina Lagoudaki (Δέσποινα Λαγουδάκη)
Vasilis Gkouletsas (Βασίλης Γκουλέτσας)
Maria Saridou (Μαρία Σαρίδου)
Iasonas Mandilas (Ιάσονας Μανδηλάς)
Edgar Avetikyan (Γιάννης)
Oleksandr Ponomarov (Αλέξανδρος)
Melani Milenova (Μέλανι Μιλένοβα)

The winner of season two was Eva Somaraki (Εύα Σωμαρακάκη).
Top 4: Nefeli Theodotou, Paraskevas Theodosiou, Despina Lagoudaki

== See also ==
- Dance on television
