= Brousko =

- Genre: Soap opera
- Created by: Vana Dimitriou
- Starring: Apostolis Totsikas; Andreas Georgiou; Eleni Vaitsou; Evelina Papoulia; Varvara Larmou; George Zenios
- Theme music composer: Efthimia Pantazopoulou; Michalis Tzouganakis
- Opening theme: Vathi potami by Michalis Tzouganakis
- Countries of origin: Greece; Cyprus
- Original language: Greek
- No. of seasons: 4
- No. of episodes: 772

Production
- Production locations: Crete, Greece; Athens, Greece; Cyprus
- Running time: 76 minutes (first episode); 50 minutes (approx.)
- Production company: Make It Productions

Original release
- Network: ANT1
- Release: September 29, 2013 – July 10, 2017

Brousko (Greek: Μπρούσκο) is a Greek television soap opera. Created by Vana Dimitriou, who has created successful series such as Erotas, combines elements of drama, mystery, adventure and occasionally comedy. The series stars Apostolis Totsikas, Andreas Georgiou, Eleni Vaitsou, Evelina Papoulia, Varvara Larmou, Nikoletta Papazafeiropoulou - Galanopoulou and George Zenios.

== Cast ==
=== Main cast ===
- Apostolis Totsikas as Sifis Giannakakis
- Andreas Georgiou as Achilleas Matthaiou
- Eleni Vaitsou as Taliya Romay
- Varvara Larmou as SHeila Romay

- George Zenios as Diamantis Nikolaou
- Evelina Papoulia as Dafni Krotira
- Joyce Evidi as Konstantina Eleftheriou
- Julie Tsolka as Vasiliki Papadaki
- Alexandros Parisis as Minas Doukakis
- Koulis Nikolaou as Matthaios Matthaiou
- John Kakoulakis as Sifalakis

=== Recurring cast ===
- Stella Kostopoulou as Dariana Romay
- Nikos Verlekis as Pavlos Giannakakis
- Melpo Kolomvou as Evrydiki Matthaiou
- Antonis Karistinos as Markos Hatzis
- Stefanos Aidonis as Pandeli Siklomis
- Anatoli Grigoriadou as Angeliki romay
- Pavlina Mavri as Dimitra Matthaiou
- Hristiana Theodorou as Hristina Lazarou
- Marinos Konsolos as Antonis Stavridis
- Elli Kiriakidou as Karloz ROMay
- Terra Elle Perrie as Fenia Romay

== Seasons overview ==
=== Episodes and ratings ===
Season	Episodes	Timeslot (EET)	Air dates		Premiere ratings		
Season	Episodes	Timeslot (EET)	Season premiere	Season finale	Rating share (adults 15–44)	Rating share (household)	Viewers (in millions)
1	193	Monday–Friday 7:00 pm	September 29, 2013	June 29, 2014	27.4%	28.7%	1.2
2	194	Monday–Friday 6:45 pm	September 28, 2014	June 28, 2015	21.5%	19.6%	0.9

Note: The dates and times refer to the original airing in Greece.
