= Mohammed al Janahi =

Emirati actor

Mohammed al Janahi محمد الجناحي
- Died: June 20, 2008; Singapore
- Occupation: Actor

Mohammed al Janahi (Arabic: محمد الجناحي; died June 20, 2008) was a noted Emirati film and stage actor.

Al Janahi starred in the role of Moubarak in the 1998 French film, La Guerre de l'eau (Sands of Eden). He appeared in the film opposite actors Randy Quaid, Christian Brendel and Rose-Marie LaVaullee. The film, which was released in 1998, told the story of an Englishman who grows up in Arabia with his father, an archaeologist. The Englishman returns to Arabia over 25 years later to uncover the secrets of his father's mysterious death.

Most recently behind the scenes, al Janahi worked as an assistant leadman in the art department on the 2007 film Charlie Wilson's War. The film, which stars Tom Hanks, Julia Roberts and Philip Seymour Hoffman, tells the story of a Texas congressman (Hanks) who works to help the Mujahideen defeat the Soviet Union in Afghanistan using an unlikely alliance of lawmakers, Israelis, Pakistanis, arms dealers and Egyptians.

Al Janahi died in Singapore on June 20, 2008, where he was receiving treatment for a lengthy illness. His body was flown back to his native Abu Dhabi for his funeral and burial.
