= Baldev Singh Khiala =

Indian politician

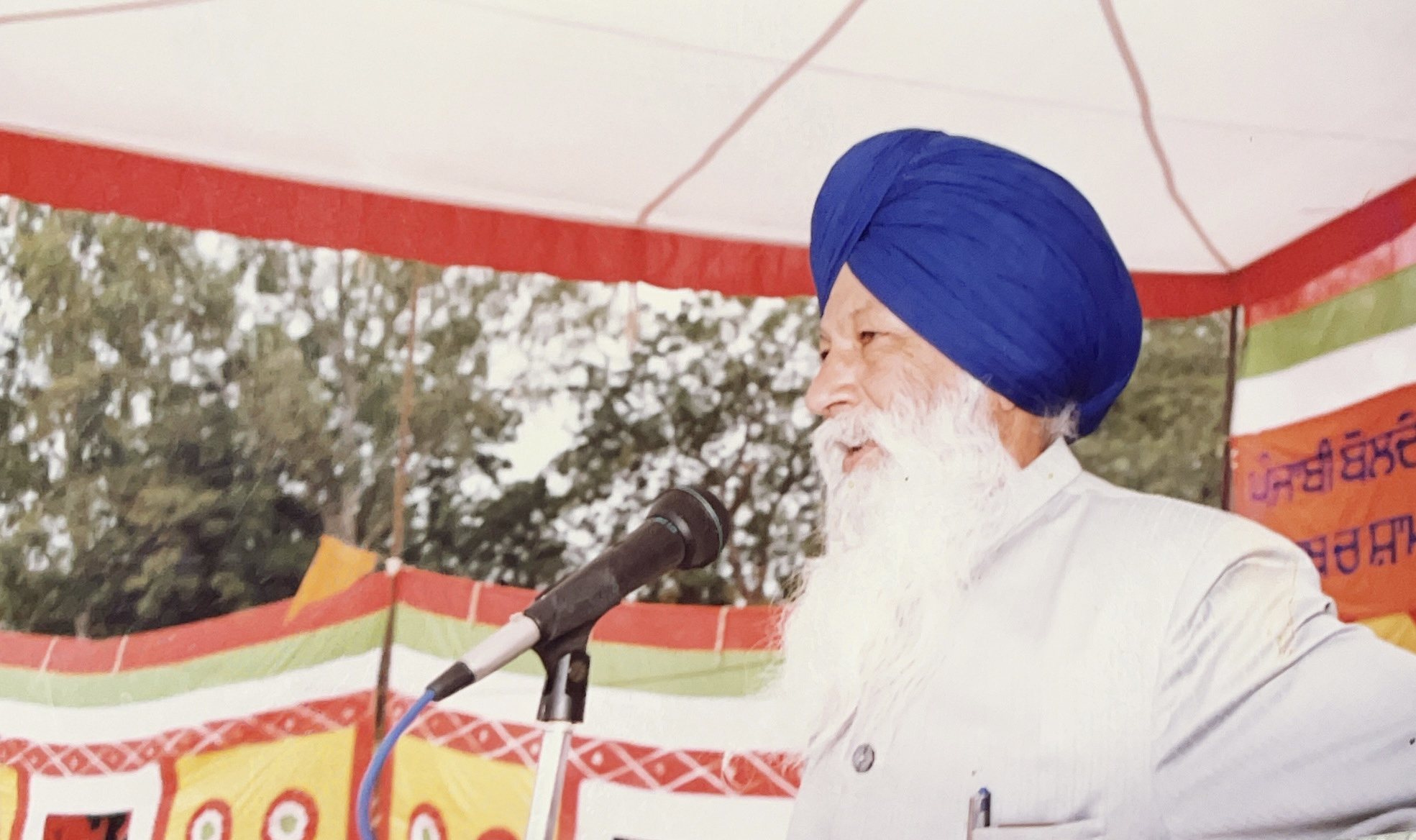
- Election Campaign, 1997

Member of the Punjab Legislative Assembly
- In office 1977-1992
- Succeeded by: Surjan Singh
- Constituency: Joga Assembly constituency

Member of the Punjab Legislative Assembly
- In office 1997-2002
- Preceded by: Surjan Singh
- Succeeded by: Jagdeep Singh Nakai
- Constituency: Joga Assembly constituency

Personal details
- Born: April 11, 1935 Raipur, Mansa
- Died: 14 June 2008 (aged 73) Fortis Healthcare Mohali, Punjab
- Party: Shiromani Akali Dal
- Spouse: Gurdial Kaur
- Children: 3 sons & 1 daughter
- Parent: Dalel Singh (father)
- Profession: Politician

Baldev Singh Khiala (11 April 1935 – 14 June 2008) was an Indian politician. He won 1977 Punjab Legislative Assembly elections from the Joga constituency, and he won again in 1980, 1985 and 1997.

== Personal and political life ==
Baldev Singh Khiala was born on April 11, 1935, in the village of Raipur, located in the Mansa district of Punjab. He was the son of Dalel Singh and was deeply rooted in his native village. Khiala began his political journey by winning Panchayati elections and holding the role for 17 years.

His dedication and commitment to public service earned him the honorable title of "Jathedar" from the Shiromani Akali Dal (SAD), a significant political party in Punjab. This recognition marked the beginning of his prominent political career within the SAD.

He was first elected as a Member of the Legislative Assembly (MLA) from the Joga constituency in 1977. He won his first election with 28,025 votes, securing 55.04% of the vote share. In the 1980 elections, he won with 24,792 votes (44.49% vote share), followed by a victory in 1985 with 29,996 votes (48.83% vote share). His final successful election was in 1997, where he garnered 30,928 votes, achieving a 34.04% vote share.

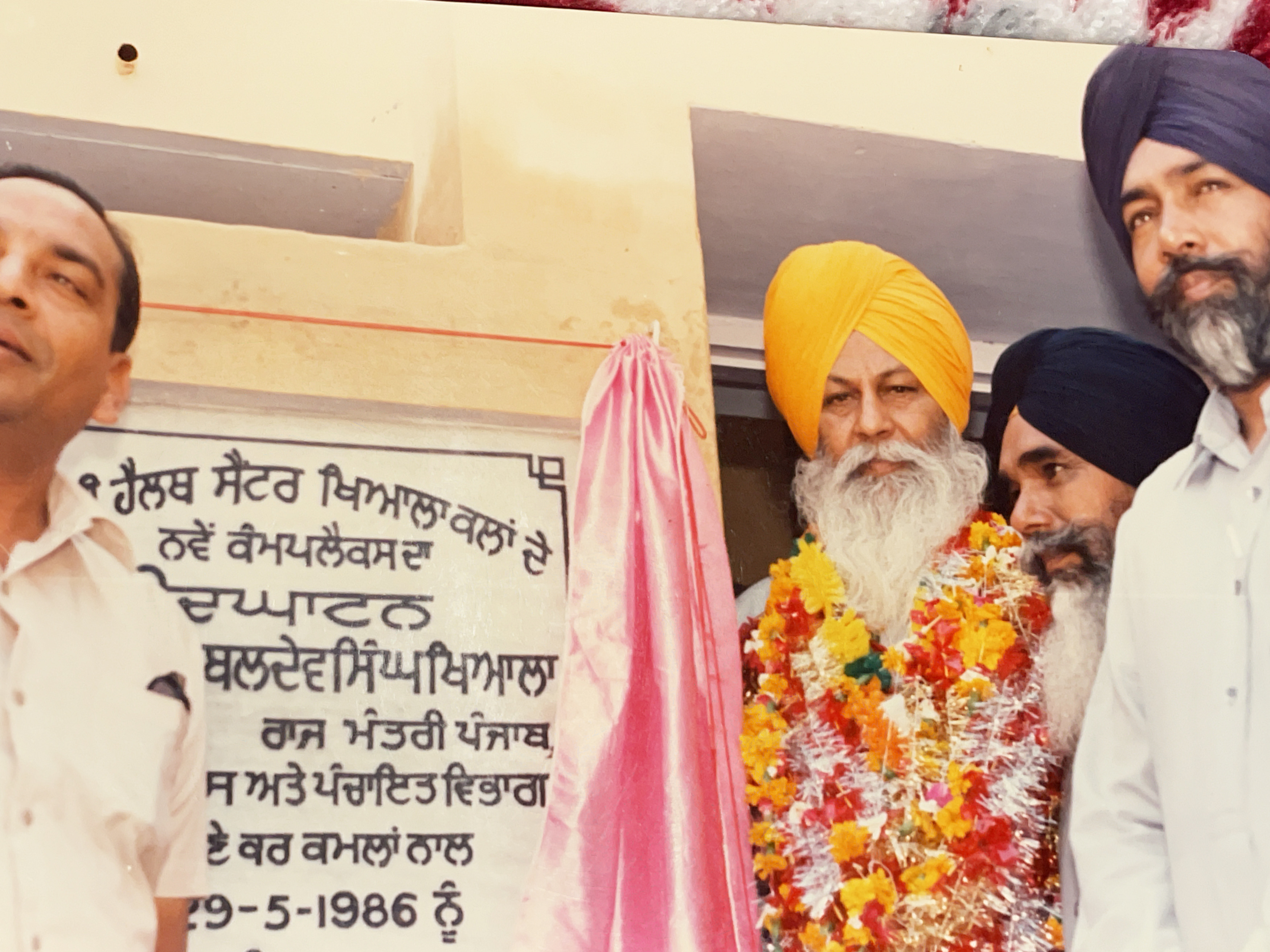
Healthcare Centre Inauguration, Khiala

Baldev Singh Khiala focused on enhancing healthcare services by setting up dispensaries as well as hospitals and established focus points for medical care throughout his constituency. His efforts extended to education, where he played a crucial role in upgrading many primary schools to middle schools and middle schools to high schools.

Khiala was also instrumental in the construction of a double road that connected 29 villages, significantly improving infrastructure and accessibility in the region. He succeeded in providing better irrigation facilities to farmers, which helped boost agricultural productivity.

In the late 2000s, Baldev Singh Khiala made a significant decision to part ways with the Shiromani Akali Dal.

Baldev Singh Khiala died on June 14, 2008.

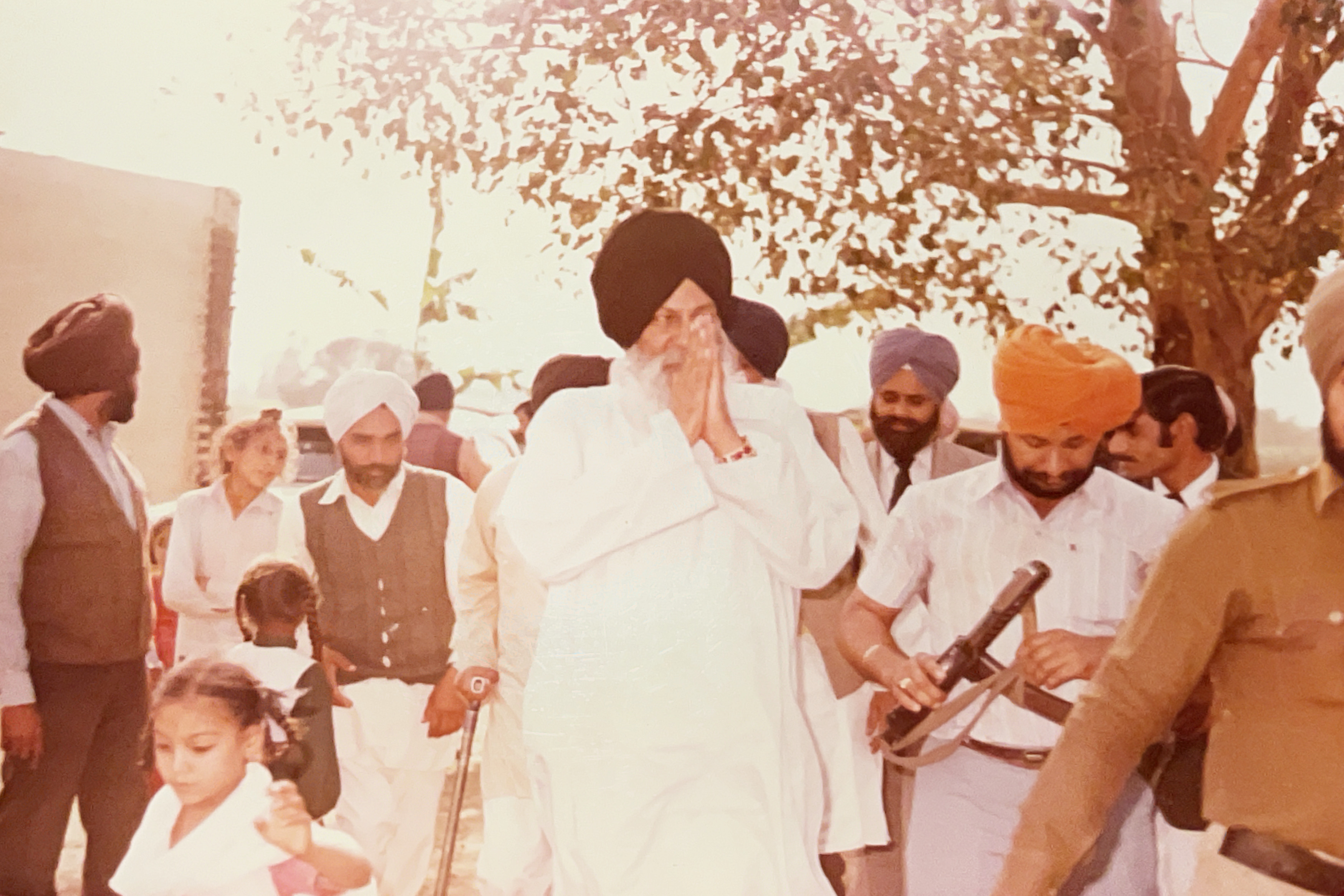
Baldev Singh
