= Nikos Sergianopoulos =

Greek actor

- Νίκος Σεργιανόπουλος
- Born: 24 September 1952; Drama, Greece
- Died: 4 June 2008 (aged 55); Pangrati, Athens, Greece
- Other names: Nikos Seryanopoulos, Nikos Seryiannopoulos
- Occupation: Actor

Nikos Sergianopoulos (Greek: Νίκος Σεργιανόπουλος; 24 September 1952 – 4 June 2008), surname also spelled as Seryanopoulos or Seryiannopoulos, was a Greek actor.

== Early life and career ==
Born in Drama, Greece, he graduated from the State Theater of Northern Greece (ΚΘΒΕ) and was a founding member of the Piramatiki Skini Tehnis artwork club in Thessaloniki. He took part in numerous theatrical and television productions and gained recognition for his role in the popular television series of Mega Channel Dyo Xenoi (1997–98).

== Death ==
Sergianopoulos was found murdered in his apartment on the morning of 4 June 2008, in Pagkrati, a central district of Athens. According to police evidence he was a victim of homicide, suffering a total of twenty-one stab wounds. His apartment was found in disarray and the number of beer bottles and drinks glasses at the scene suggested Sergianopoulos had visitors the previous day. His front door was not damaged; a fact that suggests that the murderers already knew the victim and had entered with his consent. Police believe the attack was carried out by two people. The fact that Sergianopoulos had been arrested for drug possession in the Kolonos area in December 2007 may be related to the murder.

Relatives, as well as colleagues and local people, attended his funeral on 6 June 2008, in his hometown, Drama.

David Murtikneli, a Georgian native was arrested on 26 July in Kolonos and subsequently confessed to the murder. He stated that he had attacked Sergianopoulos after his rejection of the actor's advances turned violent. The man was charged with premeditated murder, robbery, weapon possession and illegal entry into Greece.

Murtikneli was due to be released from prison in 2023, after completing 15 years of his imprisonment. However, on June 26, 2021, after a fight in the prison, he stabbed a fellow prisoner and killed him.

== Filmography ==
=== Television ===
Year	Title	Role(s)	Notes	Ref.
1986	The last Ithaca	Nikos	Recurring role	
1988	Caravanserai		1 episode	
1989	Asimina Layou	Gedeon Gidas	Lead role, 13 episodes	
1991	The Amphora Hunt	Greek actor	1 episode	
1992-1993	Africa	Nikos	Lead role, 44 episodes	
1993	Anatomy of a crime	Stratos Manolas	Episode: "The excavation"	
1993	Anatomy of a crime	Andonis Rovagiannis	Episode: "A simple family story"	
1994	It's you choice!	Angelos	Episode: "Without pity"	
1994	Anatomy of a crime	Thomas Perdikaris	Episode: "Death angels"	
1994	Anatomy of a crime	Demos	Episode: "Affectionate relationship"	
1994	Love and Passion	Manos Argyriou	Episode: "Thieves and policemen"	
1994	Love and Passion	Alexandros	Episode: "Veronica"	
1995	Fatal Passion		Lead role, 20 episodes	
1996	Guilty Love	Stefanos	Lead role, 15 episodes	
1996-1997	The Tide	Dimitris Veridis	Lead role, 19 episodes	
1997	Second truth	Nikos Chalaris	Episode: "Emergency exit"	
1997	A night like this	Petros Oikonomou	Episode: "It's never too late!"	
1997-1999	Two Strangers	Konstantinos Markoras	Lead role, 59 episodes	
1999	The Throne Room	Fotis	1 episode	
2000	What Soul Will You Deliver, You Fool Woman?	Serafim	1 episode	
2000-2001	It's never too late!	Stefanos	Lead role, 31 episodes	
2001-2002	Alma Libre	Stavros	Lead role, 20 episodes	
2002-2004	The stables of Erieta Zaeme	Mitsos Pavlatos	Lead role, 36 episodes	
2004	Eat your chocolate	Stavros Kolyvas	Lead role, 21 episodes	
2004	Take care	chat boy	1 episode	
2005-2006	The Last Heaven	Alexandros Thomopoulos	Lead role, 20 episodes	
2005-2006	Contact	Pavlos Terzakis	Lead role, 28 episodes	
2006	Wedding ring on the right	Christos Kaligas	5 episodes	
2006-2007	A chair for three	Dinos	Lead role, 20 episodes	
2007	Stories from the opposite side	Manolis Anagnostou	Episode: "I see them"	
2008	Disappearance	Phlippos Ioannu	Lead role, 20 episodes; season 1	

=== Film ===
Year	Title	Role	Notes	Ref.
1986	Caravanserai		Film debut	
2000	Oyunbozan: The Spoilsport	Sef	turkish production without his voice	
