= Guilt (2009 film) =

2009 film by Vassilis Mazomenos

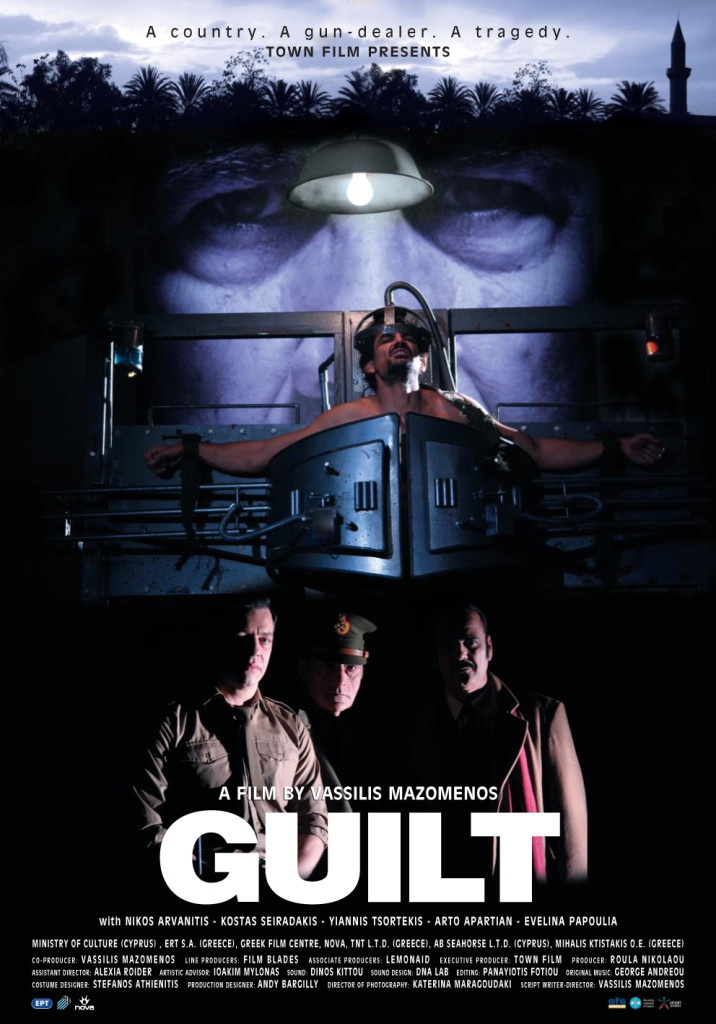
- Directed by: Vassilis Mazomenos
- Written by: Vassilis Mazomenos
- Produced by: Andros Achilleos; Vassilis Mazomenos
- Starring: Nikos Arvanitis
- Cinematography: Katerina Maragoudaki
- Edited by: Panayiotis Fotiou
- Music by: Giorgios Andreou
- Production companies: A.B. Seahorse Films; Horme Pictures; Nova
- Distributed by: Horme Pictures
- Release date: 22 September 2009
- Running time: 93 minutes
- Countries: Greece; Cyprus
- Language: Greek
- Budget: €960,000

Guilt is a 2009 Greek-Cypriot experimental surrealist horror film written and directed by Vassilis Mazomenos. It stars Nikos Arvanitis as a retired arms dealer, now old and dying, who experiences nightmarish visions that are manifestations of the guilt he feels for his role in three pivotal periods of Cypriot political history: the Cyprus Emergency in the 1950s, the Turkish invasion of Cyprus in the 1970s, and the killing of Solomos Solomou in the 1990s.
