= Ti Psyhi Tha Paradoseis Mori? =

- title screenshot
- Genre: Comedy, Dark Comedy, Drama
- Created by: Alexandros Rigas; Dimitris Apostolou
- Written by: Alexandros Rigas; Dimitris Apostolou
- Directed by: Alexandros Rigas
- Starring: Eleni Rantou; Chrysa Ropa; Eleni Kastani; Ava Galanopoulou
- Opening theme: "Nessuno mi può giudicare" by Caterina Caselli
- Composers: Luciano Beretta; Miki Del Prete; Daniele Pace; Mario Panzeri
- Country of origin: Greece
- Original language: Greek
- No. of seasons: 1
- No. of episodes: 7

Production
- Producer: Ninos Elmatzioglou
- Production locations: Athens, Greece
- Running time: 1 hour approx.
- Production company: Epsilon

Original release
- Network: Mega Channel
- Release: October 2, 2000

Ti Psuxi Tha Paradoseis Mori? (Greek: Τι Ψυχή Θα Παραδώσεις Μωρή; English: What Soul Will You Deliver, You Fool Woman?) is a Greek black comedy series created by Alexandros Rigas and Dimitris Apostolou which aired on Mega Channel in 2000 and lasted only 6 episodes.

The series focuses on the lives of four women who want to take revenge from the man who sexually abused them when they were little girls.

Despite the fact that Ti Psyhi Tha Paradoseis Mori? drew consistently high ratings from its beginning, the shootings were abruptly interrupted during the production of the 7th episode, which was never completed, leading to the series cancellation.

== Series overview ==
The plot concentrates on four women that grew up together in an orphanage, trying to revenge a worker of the institution, who, when they were little girls, raped them regularly. These four, now in their 40s, after hearing the news of his upcoming return to Greece, who is now a renowned defendant of children's rights, regroup again, after all those years to seek revenge against him, by murdering him. The women include Aleka, a single mother of a teenage son -who is a computer addict- with firm left wing beliefs, working as a journalist in a gossip magazine; Dominique Cesar, a French single woman working as a director in a major shipping company, having an affair with her boss; Popi, a depressed married woman, constantly bullied by her husband and his sister, working at her husband's restaurant; and, finally, Fotini (Fofo), a woman devoting her life at the services of the church, a very religious person, who is single.

== The Four Women ==
- Aleka Kaloudaki portrayed by Chrysa Ropa. Aleka's mother gave birth to her while she was imprisoned in the jail of Nea Alikarnassos, accused for her husband's murder, something that was never proven. Aleka, a fanatic communist is now a chief editor in a gossip magazine and has a son. Her husband abandoned them.
- Dominique Cesar portrayed by Eleni Rantou. Dominique or Dodo is from France and grew up in the orphanage because her parents died on a cruise across Aegean Sea, due to a storm. Dodo now works in a sailing company and has an illegal affair with her boss, who is married.
- Popi Kamenou portrayed by Ava Galanopoulou. Popi's parents dumped her while she was still a baby outside the Mansion of Radio and Television. She is unhappily married and works at her husband's taverna. Her husband treats her badly along with her sister-in-law.
- Fotini Tsintikidou portrayed by Eleni Kastani. Fotini or Fofo grew up in the orphanage because her mother died after she gave birth to her and her father got imprisoned. Fotini works at the toll station and lives with her father, a small-time crook who doesn't really care about her. Fofo is deeply religious and secretly in love with Father Lambros, the Priest of the church.

== Cast and characters ==
- Chrysa Ropa as Aleka Kaloudaki
- Eleni Rantou as Dominique Cesar
- Ava Galanopoulou as Popi Kamenou/Dita (a reporter working with Aleka in the magazine)
- Eleni Kastani as Fofi Tsintikidou
- Giannis Mortzos as Gerasimos Mandas
- Pavlos Haikalis as Father Lambros
- Pavlos Kontogiannidis as Anestis Tsintikidis, Fotini's father
- Giannis Tsimitselis as Manos, Aleka's son
- Maria Kanellopoulou as Kostoula Kamenou, Popi's sister-in-law
- Giannis Mpostantzoglou as Makis Kamenos, Popi's husband
- Christina Guglielmino as Kelly Damianou, Dominique's secretary

== Cancellation ==
By the beginning of the production, there were rumors of complications and difficulties during the shootings or intense arguments between the four stars and the creators of the series. The rumors became true when Mega Channel started airing each episode every 2 weeks, in order to fill the gap in its schedule. Ultimately, the station cancelled the series after the 6th episode was aired and during the shootings of the 7th.

== The Last Unfinished Episode ==
In the last episode, the four women, after a few failures and difficulties they faced in killing Mandas, decide to go to his house as reporters to interview him. Mandas actually knew who the women really are and threatens to kill them. The show ends there without knowing what happened afterwards.

== Series Continuity ==
Various sources claim that the women actually manage to kill Mandas and the series then follows the girls in a period of terror full of guilt and regret. When they are reassured that the police can not discover them, they calm down and start to feel, for their first time in their life, strong. Before the story ends, the four women face a dilemma. Mandas according to what is right, was punished for his crimes. They are absolutely sure they did the right thing, but they feel that they should also be punished for the crime they did. Therefore, they surrender themselves to the police, admitting that they murdered Mandas. In the beginning, the police find it hard to believe them, but soon the truth is revealed. The story gets front page in the media and the public opinion is divided. In the court room, they find fanatic supporters and the society that once showed them its cruel face, vindicates them and now are free to start their lives from the beginning.

== Reruns ==
Despite its cancellation and the fact that the series only consists of 7 episodes, Ti Psyhi Tha Paradoseis Mori? remains very popular to this day. The station reran the show in 2001, in 2004, in 2007, in 2010 and in 2011 achieving high ratings each time.

== Possible Remake ==
Since the series cancellation in 2000, unconfirmed rumors started spreading, stating the completion of the series or even a remake. The first rumor spread a few months after the show was cancelled, saying that some of the stars will be replaced so that the series gets completed. In 2009 it was rumoured that Mega Channel, asked from the creators to continue the series. Alexandros Rigas and Dimitris Apostolou were open to the idea. However, Ti Psyhi Tha Paradoseis Mori? was cancelled once again, since most of the actors were committed to other projects. In 2010, Mega Channel, due to its 20 years of operation, decided to air the series once again. Initially, it was thought the series continuation but it was never confirmed nor by the station or the creators. Later, the station actually announced that it was time to learn how the series continued and ended. The idea was to make a special montage of the unfinished episode with the series creator, Alexandros Rigas, narrating the end of the story. However, it was never materialized and Mega Channel only rerun the 7 episodes.

== See also ==
- List of programs broadcast by Mega Channel

Media offices
Preceded by Dyo Xenoi	Series created by Alexandros Rigas and Dimitris Apostolou	Next: Oi Stavloi tis Erietas Zaimi
