= Nasteh Dahir =

Nasteh Dahir Farah (1972 or 1973 – June 7, 2008) was a Somali reporter, and vice-president of the National Union of Somali Journalists. He was murdered in Kismayo, Somalia, on June 7, 2008.

Dahir, described as a "leading Somali journalist", was a local correspondent in Somalia for the British Broadcasting Corporation and the Associated Press news agency. He received death threats before being murdered. He was shot by gunmen and died in a hospital in Kismayo. Reporters Without Borders stated that the killers had not been identified, but the BBC and Al Jazeera reported that the killing had been attributed to Islamist insurgents.

== See also ==
- Abdul Samad Rohani, a BBC journalist murdered on the same day or the following day in Afghanistan
