= Abdul Samad Rohani =

Afghan journalist

Abdul Rohani

Abdul Samad Rohani (1982 or 1983 – June 7 or 8, 2008) was an Afghan journalist who worked for the British Broadcasting Corporation (BBC) and the Afghan news agency Pajhwok. He was abducted in Helmand Province, Afghanistan, on June 7, 2008, and found murdered the following day in Lashkar Gah. Reporters Without Borders stated that he had apparently been tortured and then shot three times.

Rohani had worked in Helmand as the head of the BBC World Service's Pashto service. The BBC issued a statement praising his "courage and dedication".

The Taliban reportedly denied involvement in his murder.

Rohani was abducted on the same day that BBC reporter Nasteh Dahir was murdered in Somalia.

== See also ==
- List of journalists killed during the War in Afghanistan (2001–present)
