= Pat Regan =

British activist

Patricia Ann Regan (5 September 1954 – 1 June 2008) was a British anti-gun activist and campaigner. She became an activist after the murder of her son Danny in 2002. Danny had become involved in drugs and was most likely the victim of a dealing dispute. She joined Mothers Against Violence after his death. She spoke at schools about the risks and repercussions of participating in crime and carrying guns when she was with the organization. She also took part in a march with more than 200 other activists.

Regan was stabbed to death on 1 June 2008 in her maisonette, located at Hyde Park, Leeds, England. Both fellow campaigners and friends paid tribute to Regan after her death. Regan's grandson, Rakeim Regan, admitted to the killing.

== In media ==
Regan's murder was the subject of a March 2015 episode of Britain's Darkest Taboos titled "My Mum was Stabbed to Death by My Son".

== Honors ==
Regan's name is one of those featured on the sculpture Ribbons, unveiled in 2024.
