= Vinicio Gómez =

Guatemalan politician

Carlos Vinicio Gómez Ruiz (23 October 1961 – 27 June 2008) was a Guatemalan politician; at the time of his death, aged 48, he was serving as the country's interior minister (ministro de gobernación).

== Career ==
Vinicio Gómez studied dental surgery at the Universidad de San Carlos de Guatemala. In the late 1980s he entered public service, with a series of appointments in the security services, specialising in criminalistics, anti-drug efforts, and combating organised crime.

He was appointed interior minister in January 2008 when President Álvaro Colom took office. He had previously served as deputy minister in the government of Óscar Berger.

== Death ==
Gómez died in a helicopter crash in the central department of Baja Verapaz along with deputy minister Édgar Hernández Umaña and the helicopter's two pilots. The authorities lost radio contact with the aircraft at 1308 local time (1908 UTC) on Friday, 27 June 2008. It disappeared over the Alta Verapaz department en route to Guatemala City from Petén in the north.It was later found to have crashed in the municipality of Purulhá, some 75 km from the departmental capital Salamá. It is thought that the crash was caused by bad weather. The officials were on their way to a regional security meeting.

As a result of the incident, Álvaro Colom returned home early from a Mexico–Central American summit under the aegis of the Tuxtla Mechanism in Villahermosa, Tabasco. Three days of national mourning were declared and both functionaries were posthumously awarded the Presidential Medal of Merit.
