= List of Afghan women writers =

This is a list of women writers who were born in Afghanistan or whose writings are closely associated with that country.

== A ==
- Atia Abawi (born 1982), American author and television journalist of Afghan descent
- Lina AbiRafeh, Arab-American (non-Afghan) author of Gender and International Aid in Afghanistan
- Farida Ahmadi (born 1958), author speaker and women's rights activist, living in Norway
- Muqadasa Ahmadzai (born 1992/1993), poet, social activist, and politician
- Soraya Alekozei (born 1955), Afghan-born memoirist, interpreter, and veteran, based in Germany
- Najwa Alimi, journalist, humanitarian
- Shakaiba Sanga Amaj (1986–2007), assassinated journalist
- Zarghona Anaa (?–1772), poet
- Nadia Anjuman (1980–2005), poet
- Asma Rasmya (1877–?), editor, school principal, and feminist
- Najiba Ayubi journalist and activist

== B ==
- Fevziye Rahgozar Barlas (born 1955), poet, and short story writer
- Babo Jan (fl. 1880), Afghan royal consort and poet
- Basira Joya (c.2001) news anchor for Zan TV and Ariana Television Network

== D ==
- Maryam Durani (born 1987), activist, journalist,
- Ayesha Durrani (18th-century), poet

== E ==
- Zohre Esmaeli (born 1985), author, model, and designer, based in Berlin

== F ==
- Wahida Faizi (born 1994), journalist
- Khalida Furugh (born 1972), poet and academic

== H ==
- Chékéba Hachemi (born 1974), writer and diplomat
- Rangina Hamidi (born 1978), writer, educator, social activist and politician
- Nadia Hashimi (born 1977), Afghan-American novelist and pediatrician

== J ==
- Malalai Joya (born 1978), activist, writer, and a politician

== K ==
- Fowzia Karimi author and illustrator
- Fawzia Koofi (born 1975) politician, memoirist and women's rights activist

== M ==
- Maryam Mahboob (born 1955), author known for her writing on Afghan patriarchy and migrants
- Farzana Marie (born 1983 or 1984) American writer and Dari translator
- Saeeda Mahmood, journalist
- Horia Mosadiq, journalist, activist, and political analyst

== N ==
- Fariba Nawa (born 1973), Afghan-born American freelance journalist

== Q ==
- Homeira Qaderi (born 1980), writer, activist and educator

== P ==
- Parween Pazhwak (born 1967), writer, poet, activist

== R ==
- Fatima Rahimi (born 1992), Afghan-born Czech journalist and radio presenter
- Zohra Rasekh (1969–2025), Afghan doctor, women's rights activist and report writer
- Layla Sarahat Rushani (1952/1954–2004), Afghan-born poet, lived in Netherlands

== S ==
- Sana Safi (born 1989), broadcast journalist
- Saira Shah, British of Afghan-descent author, reporter and documentary filmmaker
- Sahira Sharif, politician and founder of literary society Mirman Baheer
- Nafeesa Shayeq, journalist, feminist

== T ==
- Nazo Tokhi (1651–1717), writer and poet

== W ==
- Shaista Wahab, writer in Dari, librarian, and professor

== Y ==
- Sakena Yacoobi (born 1949/1950), writer, and activist
- Elham Yaghoubian, writer, politician
- Gaisu Yari, human rights activist, women's rights activist, writer, blogger, and speaker
- Malala Yousafzai (born 1997) activist and author of I Am Malala

== Z ==
- Zakia Zaki (c. 1972–2007), journalist
- Spôjmaï Zariâb (born 1949/1952), short story writer
- Maliha Zulfacar (born 1961), writer, professor, and was the ambassador of Afghanistan to Germany from 2006 to 2010.

== See also ==
- List of Afghan women journalists
- List of women writers
