= List of Afghan women journalists =

The following is a list of notable women journalists who were born in Afghanistan:

== A ==
- Asma Rasmya (born 1877) editor, school principle and feminist. Mother of queen Soraya Tarzi and mother-in-law of king Amanullah Khan

== B ==
- Basira Joya (born 2001/2002) anchor for Zan TV and Ariana Television Network before fleeing to the U.S. in 2021.

== F ==
- Fariba Nawa (born 1973) freelance journalist and author of Opium Nation.
- Farahnaz Forotan (Persian: فرحناز فروتن, born 1992) journalist
- Fatima Rahimi (born 1992) Afghan-Czech journalist, presenter of Hergot! on Czech Radio's Radio Wave.

== H ==
- Horia Mosadiq human rights activist, political analyst and journalist who works for Amnesty International.

== M ==
- Maryam Durani (مَریَم دورانی) (born 1987) Afghan activist and women's advocate.
- Mina Mangal (1992 to 2019) journalist, political advisor, and women's rights activist who was killed by gunfire in 2019 in uncertain circumstances.

== N ==
- Najiba Ayubi journalist, humanitarian and activist. Managing director of the Killid Group nonprofit media network.
- Najwa Alimi journalist and human right activist
- Najiba Laima Kasraee, journalist, writer, founder of BBC Academy International websites, Radio Free Europe/Radio Library Academy, and Laima International Training.

== S ==
- Saeeda Mahmood BBC World Service journalist
- Sana Safi BBC World Service journalist
- Shakaiba Sanga Amaj (Pashto:شکېبا څانګه آماج) (born 1986 assassinated 2007)
- Salma Niazi The Afghan Times journalist

== W ==
- Wahida Faizi (Persian: وحیده فیضی) journalist, head of the Women Journalist Section of the Afghan Journalists Safety Committee from 2015 until the fall of Kabul on 15 August 2021.

== Z ==
- Zakia Zaki (c. 1972 – 4 June 2007) journalist and founder of Afghan Radio Peace (Sada-i-Sulh) station.
- Zohra Daoud (Dari: زهره يوسف داود); (born 1954 in Kabul) Miss Afghanistan 1972 winner, fled Afghanistan for the United States.

== See also ==
- List of Afghan women writers
