= BBC Pashto =

Pashto-language station of the BBC World Service

- Type: Radio network and website
- Country: United Kingdom, Afghanistan, and Pakistan
- Availability: International
- Endowment: Foreign and Commonwealth Office, UK
- Owner: BBC
- Launch date: 1981
- Webcast: www.bbc.com/pashto/bbc_pashto_radio/liveradio
- Official website: BBC Pashto
- Language: Pashto

BBC Pashto (Pashto: بي بي سي پښتو) is the Pashto-language station of the BBC World Service. It was launched in August 1981, and reaches out to the over 50-60 million Pashto speakers in Afghanistan and Pakistan, as well as the Pashtun diaspora around the world. Nabi Misdaq was its first editor.

== Radio ==
Initially, the service only broadcast radio programmes - mainly News and current affairs, however, it later expanded by introducing entertainment slots, long form, features, magazines, hard talk and interactive shows such as Stasy Ghag Your Voice which is still very popular among its audience.

On 13 October 2026, the Taliban confirmed it had banned the broadcast of BBC Pashto, as well as BBC Dari and the BBC World Service, in Afghanistan.

== Online ==
In 2002, BBC Pashto launched its web page BBCPashto.com. In recent years they have expanded their presence on the social platform. Now BBC Pashto is available on Facebook, Instagram, YouTube, Twitter, and SoundCloud.

== TV ==
On January 20, 2014, the section began its 15-minute daily news bulletins - Aired via its partner station in Afghanistan Shamshad TV, the bulletin soon became popular and had a weekly audience of around 1.5 million (2015). The transmission time was 1230 GMT/1700 Afg Time. Ismail Miakhail was the launch producer and Emal Pasarly is the editor.

In 2015, due to its huge popularity, high demand and growing viewership, the programme was relaunched and rebranded as BBC Naray Da Wakht (BBC World Right Now). The new 24 minutes show goes live from London in peak time (18.00 Kabul time) on the same partner network Shamshad TV. The new vibrant, hard-hitting live programme provides Pashto speakers with in-depth reporting, analysis and interviews. It also has a weekly interactive segment, Staso Ghazh (Have Your Say), containing live phone-ins, social media round ups, comments, video, pictures and audio content from viewers. The programme is presented by lead anchors Sana Safi and Amanullah Atta.

Based on a survey conducted by the BBC in 2015, BBC Pashto content reaches 6.5 million people in Afghanistan, Pakistan and the rest of the world (2015).

== Female Editor ==
Safia Haleem was its first female editor. She was born in Peshawar, northwestern Pakistan, and graduated from Peshawar University. As a writer and historian Ms Haleem has authored several books in Pashto and English.

== Programmes ==
- Stasy Ghag (Have Your Say)
- Naray Da Wakht (World Right Now)
- Da Malghalaro Amil (Art Show)
- Wama Studio (Studio 7)
- Nima Narai (Half of the World)
- Jor Taza (How Are You)
- Khaza Aw Nananai Naray (Afghan Woman Hour)
- Global Newsbeat
- Pilwazai (Art and Literature)
- De Fekr Lari (The Path Of Thought)
- Rogha Sata (Good Health)
- Da Woonai Bahs (Weekly Debate)

== Awards ==
- Sony Radio Award for Service to Public Health
- 'Team of the Year' at the first BBC World Service Awards, 2007
- New York Festivals World's Best Radio Programme, 2007

== Schedule ==
The radio service is broadcast on 31 FM stations in Afghanistan as of December 2024, while the shortwave transmitting station in Al Ashkharah, Oman and occasionally the Woofferton transmitting station were known to broadcast BBC Pashto programming 5 to 6 hours a day as of 23 December 2024.

== Journalists ==
Some of its most famous journalists are:

1. Mirwais Jalil
2. Nabi Misdaq
3. Daud Junbish
4. Ahmed Omaid Khpalwak
5. Abdul Samad Rohani
6. Sana Safi
7. Najiba Kasraee
8. Kamal Behzadi
9. Yaqub Kakar

== See also ==
- BBC Bangla
- BBC Hausa
- BBC Persian
