= Zallascht Sadat =

Afghan-German model

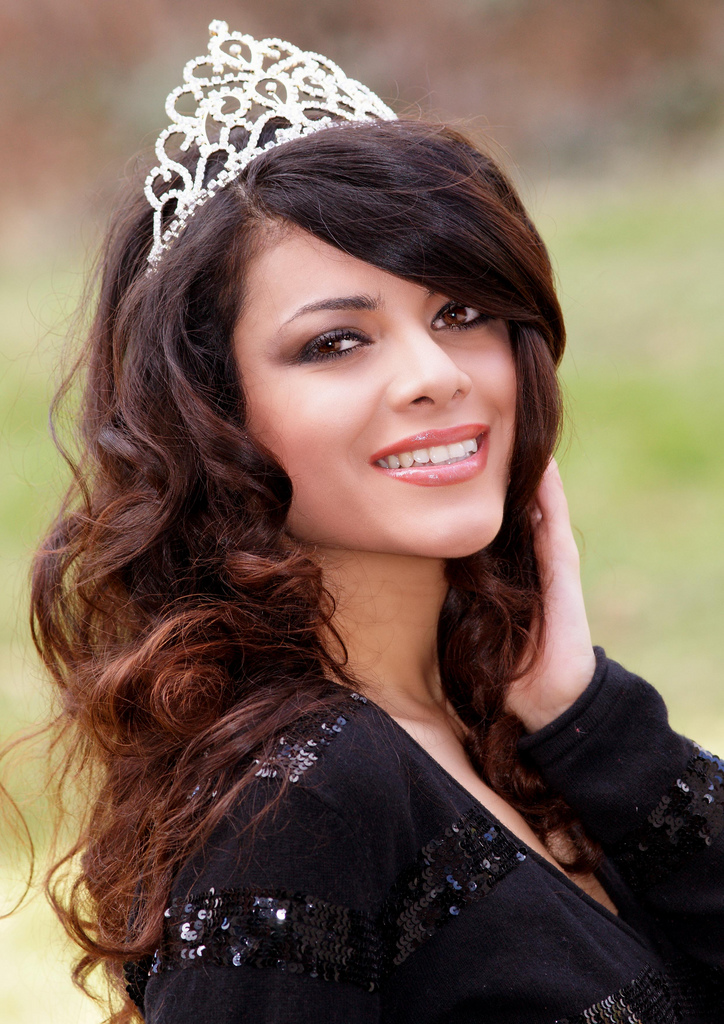
- Zallascht Sadat in 2009
- Born: Zallascht Sadat زرلښت سادات; 12 April 1982 (age 44); Kabul, Democratic Republic of Afghanistan
- Education: Frankfurt University of Applied Sciences
- Height: 5 ft 10 in (1.78 m)
- Beauty pageant titleholder
- Title: Miss Afghanistan 2008-2009; Miss Hessen 2010; Miss Süddeutschland 2010; Miss Deutschland 2010-11; Miss Globe 2012
- Hair color: Brunette
- Major competitions: Miss Afghanistan 2008 (winner); Miss Deutschland 2010 (winner); Miss Globe 2012 (winner)

Zallascht Sadat (Pashto: زرلښت سادات; born 12 April 1982) is an Afghan-German model who has won several pageants. Her most recent win was the Miss Globe 2012 title.

== Biography ==
Zallascht Sadat was born in Kabul, immigrating to Germany with her family in 1988.

She studied business administration in Frankfurt, Germany at the Frankfurt University of Applied Sciences. She created her own non-profit organization, the Zallascht Sadat Afghanistan Foundation, to support persons infected with HIV in Afghanistan. She is fluent in English, Persian, German, and Pashto.

== Pageants ==
Sadat entered and won her first pageant at the Miss Afghanistan 2008–2009 pageant. The pageant was held in Hamburg, Germany due to the volatile situation in Afghanistan at that time. She is the first officially elected Miss Afghanistan since Zohra Yousuf Daoud was elected Miss Afghanistan in 1972. In 2010 she won the Miss Hessen 2010 and Miss Süddeutschland 2010 pageants which led to her entry to the Miss Deutschland 2010 pageant which she subsequently won. She was crowned Miss Deutschland 2010. In June 2010, it was revealed that she had lied about her age, but she was permitted to keep her crown. She kept the Miss Deutschland title the following year since a pageant was not held in 2011. In 2012 Zallascht entered the Miss Globe contest held by the World Beauty Organization and won that pageant. She was crowned Miss Globe 2012.
