= Ahmed Omaid Khpalwak =

Afghan BBC journalist

Ahmad Omaid Khpalwak
- Born: c. 1987; Khair Khana, Kabul, Afghanistan
- Died: 28 July 2011; Tarin Kowt, Afghanistan
- Occupation: Journalist
- Organization(s): Pajhwok Afghan News, BBC World News Service

Ahmad Omaid Khpalwak, also spelled as Ahmed Omed Khpulwak, (c. 1987 – 28 July 2011) was an Afghan journalist who worked for the Pajhwok Afghan News and as a freelance stringer for the BBC since 2008. After an investigation into his death, it was determined by the International Security Assistance Force that an American soldier had accidentally killed Khpalwak while clearing a broadcast building of terrorists while Tarin Kowt was under attack. Khpalwak was the third journalist from Pajhwok to be killed in three years. He was the third BBC reporter to be killed in Afghanistan and the second BBC reporter to be killed in the War in Afghanistan.

== Biography ==
=== Career ===
Khpalwak began working for Pajhwok after completing his education in 2007, and he worked first as a freelancer and then later became staff. Khpalwak joined the staff of the BBC World Service as a journalist on 1 May 2008. He worked as a stringer for the BBC, based in Uruzgan Province, and was paid for each story which was published or broadcast by the BBC. He often reported for BBC Pashto on events in southern Afghanistan. Khpalwak simultaneously also worked for Pajhwok Afghan News agency.

"His last two stories for Pajhwok Afghan News, before he died on 28 July in a major attack in Tarin Kowt, capital of Uruzgan province, were about an attack on police checkpoints in which both Taliban and police were killed, and an interview with a would-be suicide bomber. Few of his 24 years of life saw any kind of peace in Afghanistan," a colleague wrote.

=== Personal ===
Khpalwak, who was twenty-four years old, had a three-month-old daughter.

After Khpalwak's death, Khpalwak's father, Ghulam Nabi, did not accept offers by the United States to compensate the family Omaid's death and wanted the investigation to continue. The family members sought asylum in Australia for fear of retaliation. Abdul Mujeeb Khalvatgar, executive director of NAI SOMA, said the capital did not offer the Khpalwaks anonymity because it was small and he believed the Khpalwaks were in danger.

== Background ==
Three suicide bombers and three accomplices bombed several government buildings as well as a broadcasting station in which a total of 21 civilians were killed and 38 more injured. The dead included 10 children, three police, and one Afghan reporter. Afghan and US-led NATO forces engaged responded and killed all insurgents. In the shooting, Pajhwok Journalist Ahmad Omaid Khpalwak was killed by a group of US soldiers while they were clearing the broadcasting station. The incident occurred over a 5-hour period.

== Death ==
Khpalwak was killed by American ISAF troops 28 July 2011 in Tarin Kowt, Afghanistan, after Taliban insurgents attacked government facilities, as well as the state broadcasting station, in Uruzgan's provincial capital. The New York Times called the attack one of the "most audacious surprise attacks" ever undertaken by the Taliban.

Reporters Without Borders and BBC News called for an investigation after Khpalwak was killed at the broadcasting station. The journalist's brother Ahmad Jawid Khpalwak believed he was reaching for his press card when he was shot. The Los Angeles Times wrote about text messages that Khpalwak sent his brother in the minutes before he was killed. "Death is approaching," he messaged. "I am hiding;" and a short time later wrote, "If I die, pray for me."

A NATO investigation revealed 8 September that an American soldier had killed Khpalwak. Kphalwak's death happened while he was reporting for BBC Pashto about the Taliban attack. The ISAF arrived at an attacked building and was making sure that there were no Taliban still inside. An American soldier discovered Khpalwak hiding in a bathroom and saw Khpalwak reaching for something when it was mostly likely his press card. The soldier thought that Khpalwak could have been a suicide bomber and trying to reach for a device that would set off a bomb before he shot 20 rounds at Khpalwak with an M-4. The investigation also said Khpalwak held a press identification card in his hand.

The investigation concluded, "... the ISAF member involved in this incident complied with the laws of armed conflict and rules of engagement and acted reasonably under the circumstances."

== Context ==
While the intended targets of the Taliban attack were Uruzgan's Governor and a militia leader named Matiullah Khan, the Taliban also stormed the offices of local radio and television stations, leading to Khpalwak being killed while hiding in a bathroom by American troops that came to sweep out the Taliban.

Local reporters are the ones who are in the most danger, according to press activist Abdul Mujeeb Khalvatgar, executive director the NAI Supporting Open Media in Afghanistan.

== Impact ==
Khpalwak is the third Pajhwok reporter and the third BBC reporter to be killed in Afghanistan. Working for the BBC, Mirwais Jalil died in Kabul in the civil war of the 1990s. During the War in Afghanistan, Abdul Samad Rohani was killed by an unknown gunman in Lashkargah, Helmand Province in June 2008. Like Khpalwak, Rohani worked for both Pajhwok and the BBC Word News. Pajhwok reporter Janullah Hashimzada was killed in the remote Khyber area August 2009.

== Reactions ==
The incident raised continuing concerns about the civilian casualties in the War in Afghanistan.

The Los Angeles Times said, "The incident points up the daily dangers faced by Afghans who work for foreign organizations, as well as Afghan civilians in general, particularly those living in a broad swath of Afghanistan's restive south."

Peter Horrocks, director of BBC Global News, said: "Ahmed Omed's death further highlights the great dangers facing journalists who put their lives on the line to provide vital news from around the world. It is essential that journalists are given the best possible protection whilst reporting in dangerous situations so that the world can hear their stories."

Reporters Without Borders said, "This mishap has highlighted the constant danger for civilians and journalists, who are often at the center of the fighting." The press freedom and safety organisation held NATO and the Taliban responsible for Khpalwak's death.

== Recognition ==
A press club in the Afghan province Uruzgan was named in honour of Ahmad Omaid Khpalwak.

== See also ==
- List of journalists killed during the War in Afghanistan (2001–present)
- Media of Afghanistan
