= Najiba Laima Kasraee =

Journalist

Najiba Laima Kasraee is CEO of Laima International Training, a journalist, media consultant, founder and former Director of Academy for RFE/RL. Najiba Kasraee led the foundational research and development for the USAGM Academy through a USAGM award to Laima International Training, with a five-year ceiling value of $7.5 million. Her contribution received personal recognition from then-USAGM CEO Amanda Bennett. Najiba is also known for her work with the BBC World Service as a journalist and as founder of the first languages training for the BBC Academy. Her work focussed on building training resources for journalists in the language they report in. She has founded BBC Academy International Languages websites and news style guides in more than 42 vernacular languages.

She is also known for presenting for BBC Afghan service, in radio programmes Your Voice (2001-2007) and The Weekly Debate (2001-2007), and on TV in Path of Thoughts (2014-2019). She has created and presented Pashto children's stories, including the BBC series Lallo Lallo, which ran for 95 episodes.

Her interview with Prime Minister Tony Blair in 2001 won a Sony Radio Award, and was described by the Guardian as having "a far-reaching effect on Blair's mindset."

Najiba is fluent in Pashto, Persian, Russian and English and can speak Hindi and Urdu.

== Early years and Education ==
When Najiba was an 11-year-old child when her father was the Afghan Health minister, Dr Zeary. They were invited by Afghan President Hafizullah Amin, along with many other cabinet ministers, to a housewarming party of his new home, the Taj Beg Palace. On this night, on 27 December 1979, Soviet Union invaded Afghanistan. The palace was attacked in Operation Storm-333, and a number of Afghan's were killed, including President Amin, and his two sons. The youngest son was 11-years old and died from shrapnel wounds. Najiba and her family survived the attack, although they were incarcerated in prison for some time directly after the attack.

As a young adult Najiba moved from Kabul to Moscow in the Soviet Union, where she gained a master's degree in journalism from Moscow State University, and graduated in 1990.

In 1991 she moved to London UK with her husband and started work at the BBC Pashto Service in London, UK.

== Journalism ==
Najiba Laima Kasraee worked at the BBC World Service in London from 1992 - 2007. In that time she presented a monthly television news programme for BBC Pashto for over 60 episodes, that ran from 2014-2019. She produced and presented news current affairs programmes in Persian, Pashto, English and Russian.

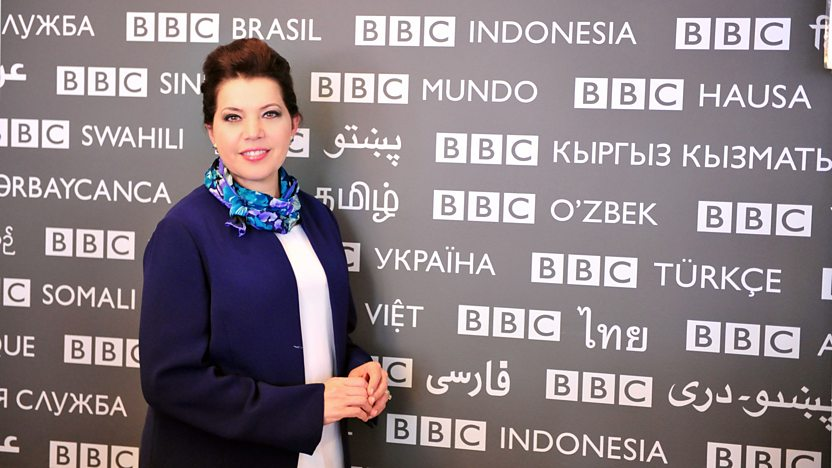

In Najiba's position of Editor for current affairs, she managed the news coverage of the first Afghan election for the BBC, producing 18 hours of news output. She presented current affairs programmes on key moments in history such as 9/11 and the death of Princess Diana for BBC World Service. She presented and produced special features on women’s mental health, children and youth entertainment programmes.

In leadership roles, she was part of the expansion and digitalisation operation of BBC Persian and Pashto Service. Najiba was also a Planning Editor for BBC Central Asian Service.

On 9 October 2001, Najiba Laima Kasraee interviewed British Prime Minister Tony Blair in the Cabinet room, 10 Downing Street, London for the BBC World Service, BBC Pashto Service. Blair promised the international coalition would not walk away from Afghanistan after the immediate conflict with Osama bin Laden and the Taliban regime was over. She was later interviewed about her conversation with Blair for The Guardian, in which she revealed she had only 30 minutes to prepare for the interview. She said she took the opportunity to tell Blair about her homeland and to ask questions that would have been on the minds of the ordinary Afghan people: "The people who, in their millions, have struggled through two decades of war just to face another conflict." The interview appeared in CBS 60-Minutes programme. The interview won the "2001 Award" at the 2002 Sony Awards for BBC World Service along with her interview with Vice-President of United States Dick Cheney.

== Children's stories and programmes ==
During the 1990s Afghani civil war, Najiba Kasraee wrote and presented a radio programme for Pashto children, which aired Wednesday's on BBC Pashto Radio. She told the stories along with the little rabbit Kharaki, whose questions and reactions were influenced by Najiba's daughters responses: "I was trying to give them some moments of sparkle and happiness so they could forget, even if temporarily, the bombs, the hunger, the fear, and perhaps lose themselves in a place where good prevailed over evil, where darkness always gave way to sunshine."

Lallo Lallo was inspired by the success of Najiba's earlier children's radio programme developed and presented for BBC Pashto. She has written and presented 95 episodes of children's TV programme Lallo Lallo (Lullaby) for BBC Pashto and BBC World Service. The series was recorded from 2017 till 2019 and taught "children in Afghanistan, Pakistan – in fact, anywhere else in the world – fairytales in Pashto, about honesty, sharing, being safe in the street, the importance of brushing their teeth and washing their hands and many other things that help educate them about the world around them." She presented the series with character Warakai, the rabbit, who is the daughter of the earlier Kharaki. The stories cover a number of subjects, including the importance of honesty, sharing, coping with war and staying clear of landmines.

== Work as a Media Trainer ==
=== BBC Academy International Languages ===
Najiba Laima Kasraee is the founder of BBC Academy's International Languages. She identified the need to train BBC World Service journalists in the languages they reported in. The initiative led to training resources in more than 42 vernacular languages for BBC journalists, and available to the wider world. At the core of each languages training offer is an explanation of journalistic ethics and values, such as accuracy, impartiality and accountability, and how-to-guides for reflecting these values in the language used. In addition many languages contain training content and interviews about news journalism, multimedia content production, tv and radio and social media. The eleven year project covered more than 42 BBC World Service languages in online content and in style guides.

Najiba presented an episode of the BBC Academy Podcast "Women in journalism: challenges and career development" in which she interviewed four female journalists from the BBC World Service about the challenges of being a woman in the newsroom and offer tips for women wanting to develop a career in journalism.

In her work for BBC Academy she organised 7 world-wide conferences with BBC International partners. These advanced training in issues such as impartiality in language, fighting against fake news and creating content for a younger audience. She has been a keynote speaker at several international journalism events on original thinking and creativity, understanding audience growth and the fall of traditional radio and TV.

Najiba was part of the BBC GWiN (Global Women in News) coaching and mentorship programme, run for and by women working in BBC News. Through involvement in GWiN events and being a mentor, she assisted women in more junior news roles to find their voice and build their careers.

=== Laima International Training ===
In 2019 Najiba established London based media training consultancy Laima International Training, with the mission teaching journalistic practices, media skills and business leadership. Laima International Training's mission is "to teach journalists and associated media staff not only the latest technological innovations but also key skills such as verification, originality and good storytelling."

=== Radio Free Europe/Radio Liberty ===
In December 2020 Najiba started working with RFE/RL to provide journalism training and career development to colleagues across the organisation. She held the position of Director of the Academy at Radio Free Europe/Radio Liberty during which time she pioneered an online learning programme that would be a place for strategic organisation wide training in journalism and media skills. She has tripled the number of hours spent in face-to-face and live online training across 27 newsrooms.

== Speaking ==
=== Interview Appearances ===
"Facing a soldier who had the mission to kill her": In 2009, on the 30th anniversary of the Soviet invasion of Afghanistan, Najiba recounted how at the age of 11 years old, she was present in the Afghan Presidential Palace of Taj Beg the night President Hafizullah Amin was killed. In the interview she spoke to Rustam Tursunkulov, the then Soviet Army's Special Forces Commander that carried out orders as part of Operation Storm-333. The soldier who had been commanded to kill everything that moves asked for Najiba's forgiveness. The interview made up a two-part series for Witness on BBC World Service and was available on BBC Russia.

Outlook, in an episode for the World Service's 80th birthday, for BBC World Service broadcast on 29 February 2012, Najiba discussed her experience of witnessing the assassination of President Hafizullah Amin.

"My Life in the Ghosts of Bush" Between the Ears, BBC Radio 3. Talking about her time at BBC Pashto Service, broadcast December 2012.

The Fifth Floor for BBC World Service, in an episode broadcast 21 November 2015. In conversation about film 'He Named Me Malala', Najiba Kasraee discusses the historic significance of Malalai of Maiwand.

Over to You for BBC World Service, in an episode broadcast 20 March 2017. Najiba Kasraee appeared in the position of Editor of the BBC Academy International Language websites, to explain the reasons why training material for journalists has been made available in multiple languages.

On BBC World Service programme The Fifth Floor, episode "Naming names on the fifth floor", Najiba discussed the issues and cultural sensitivities around the Korean language that have impacted building the BBC Korean service and style guide. Broadcast 12 December 2017.

The Fifth Floor for BBC World Service, episode broadcast 12 January 2018, in which Najiba discusses her Pashto language children's programme Lallo Lallo.

The Fifth Floor for BBC World Service, episode broadcast 14 September 2018, Najiba read an excerpt from the Pashto translation of Sea Prayer by Khaled Hosseini. She wrote the translation of the book into Pashto.

=== Public speaking and conferences ===
20 November 2013, "Independent Journalism: Language and Impartiality" in Hong Kong. 2 day conference hosted by BBC Academy, BBC Chinese and School of Communication, Hong Kong Baptist University.

7 August 2014, Keynote speaker at Jinan University, China.

1 March 2018, Kadir Has University, in Istanbul. Keynote speaker on "The Importance of Correct Language in News".

== Translation work ==
Najiba edited the translation of Shahnameh, The Book of King, the long epic poem written by the Persian poet Ferdowsi between c. 977 and 1010.

She also translated Sea Prayer by Khaled Hosseini into Pashto.
