= Nilüfer Demir =

Turkish photojournalist

- Born: 1986 (age 39–40)
- Occupation: Photojournalist

Nilüfer Demir (born 1986) is a Turkish photojournalist based in Bodrum, Turkey. She has worked with the Doğan News Agency since she was a teenager. She covered the European migrant crisis during the summer of 2015, and her photographs of Alan Kurdi became world news on 2 September 2015. She came across the body of Kurdi on the beach and took a number of photos.

== Photo of Alan Kurdi ==
Press photo that was re-tweeted by journalists on 2 September 2015

She said that she felt "petrified" upon seeing the corpse of the toddler. Then she took the pictures to share her feelings.

Demir's photograph of Kurdi has been compared with iconic photos that changed the world. Her photograph accompanied by hashtag "KiyiyaVuranInsanlik" (English: humanity washed ashore) became the top trending topic on Twitter. In March 2016 her photograph was the subject of a Dutch documentary about iconic photos, and specifically why this photo was not selected for the World Press Photo, though it had resulted in many different reactions across Europe that changed the attitude of many people about the European migrant crisis. The winning World Press photo of 2015 showed a child migrant that successfully crossed into Europe and thus communicated hope rather than despair.

== Other photos by Demir of Alan Kurdi ==
Demir took a series of photos, though it was the one initially retweeted on Twitter that is considered to have had the most international impact. This is also the image chosen by Dutch newspaper Trouw for their front page on 3 September 2015 after a female journalist published it on their website in the evening of 2 September 2015. Though the initially retweeted image carried the highest emotional impact, the one most commonly chosen became a photo of the toddler seen from the side, with an aid worker approaching from the right.

=== Photo of Alan Kurdi seen from the side ===
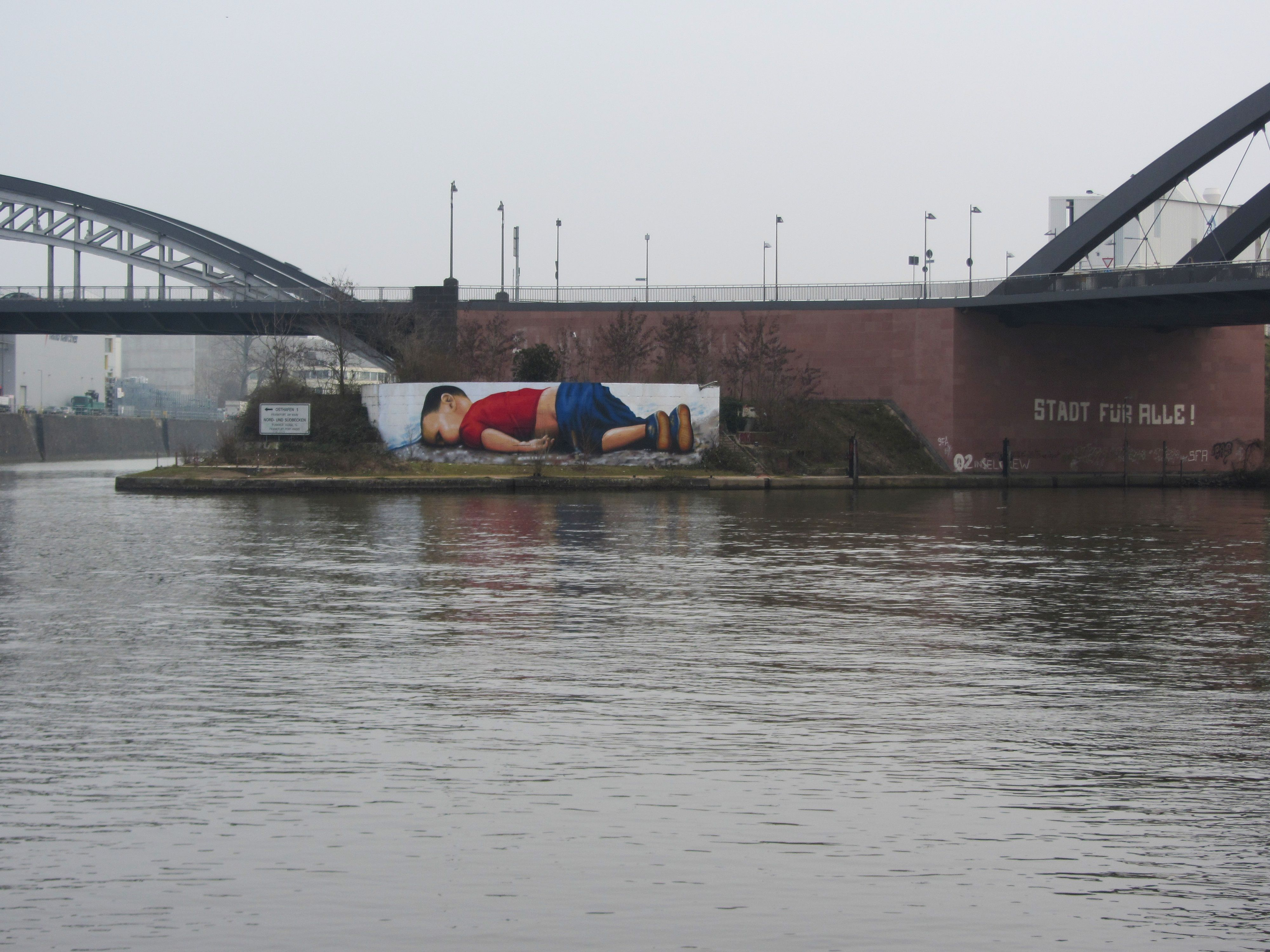
Detail of Demir's photo seen from the side with an aid worker approaching from the right, used as graffiti on a curved wall along the river Main in Frankfurt

Time Magazine selected this image also for its "Top 100 Photos of 2015". Time published an update on Demir's photo of the boy seen from the side in a one-year anniversary update on their choice of this aid-worker photo, mentioning that it was also shared on social media "by thousands of people".

=== Photo of Alan Kurdi in the arms of an aid worker ===
Other news agencies decided to select other photos of the same dead toddler with a rescue worker in the image, such as one with the lifeless corpse in the arms of an aid worker.

== Art inspired by Demir's photos ==
The photo of Alan Kurdi seen from the side, which partially shows the child's face, was re-used later on 6 January 2016 for a comic by Charlie Hebdo referring to the New Year's Eve sexual assaults in Germany for their anniversary edition commemorating the Charlie Hebdo shooting, which sparked a "racism debate". Later that month Chinese artist Ai Weiwei posed on the beach in a recreation of the position of the toddler's corpse at the time of the photographs. In March 2016 graffiti artists in Germany made an artistic political statement across from the headquarters of the European Central Bank (ECB) titled "Europa tot – Der Tod und das Geld", following these political artworks in January.

In 2018, the fourth novel by Khaled Hosseini, Sea Prayer, was published. Hosseini said that the idea of the novel was inspired by photographs by Demir.

== Awards ==
- For her photo of Alan Kurdi, Demir won the Press Photo of the Year award in the 2016 Turkey Photojournalist Association Press’ Photos of the Year contest.
- Gold medal as part of the 2016 Elizabeth Neuffer Memorial Prize awarded by the United Nations Correspondents Association for written media (including online media) Sponsored by the Alexander Bodini Foundation.
