= Mirman Baheer =

Secret literary society of women in Afghanistan

Mirman Baheer is a secret literary society of women meeting across Afghanistan. Founded in 2010 by Sahira Sharif, the organization attracted international attention after research conducted by Eliza Griswold was published in 2012. It has continued to meet into 2021, shifting to livestreaming meetings during the COVID-19 pandemic.

== History ==
Sahira Sharif, an Afghan politician, founded Mirman Baheer in 2010 as a literary society for Afghan women to read their writings and share accounts of their life. The group also offered participants an opportunity to call by phone to read their work to the group, while Sharif and other members read their own work on the radio and publicized the phone line that Eliza Griswold, writing for the BBC, described in 2016 as a "poetry hot line of sorts".

Sharif has said she founded the society because she felt literature was a valuable tool to fight for women's rights, more so than political rallies. In 2012, it was described by Eliza Griswold in The New York Times as the largest women's literary society in Afghanistan and compared it to the earlier Golden Needle Sewing School. In 2013, she told BBC News, "It's our form of resistance." Griswold wrote that by 2012, the group had over 100 members in Kabul alone, many of whom were prominent members of society, and about three hundred in more rural locations. She noted that members in Kabul met publicly, while many of those in other provinces met secretly. Griswold conducted research into poetry by women into Afghanistan that was supported by the society, and in 2014 published a collection of landays, I Am the Beggar of the World. In 2015 Sharif spoke at the International Poetry Festival with Griswold about Mirman Baheer.

In 2021 Time reported that the organization met weekly, in a secret location that changed every meeting. The magazine described Mirman Baheer as providing a place for women to tell stories that "would otherwise remain hidden." They went on to describe the society as having several hundred members widely ranging in age, from 13 to 55, around Afghanistan. A majority of members are Pashtuns. The organization includes programs offering mentorship of inexperienced poets by more established authors. During the COVID-19 pandemic, which severely affected Afghanistan, Mirman Baheer shifted to livestreaming meetings via Facebook to their members.

== See also ==
- List of Afghan women writers
