= Vin Ray =

Vin Ray is a member of the BBC's journalism board and the first director of the BBC College of Journalism.

== History in the BBC ==
Ray joined the BBC in CEEFAX in 1987 and moved on to work as a producer on the Nine O'Clock News under the editorship of Mark Thompson.

As a foreign field producer, Ray worked on many of the big stories of the early 1990s, including the first Gulf War, the Gorbachev coup and the Bosnian war. In the UK, he was in charge of the field operation for the resignation of Margaret Thatcher, as well as numerous IRA bombings.

He became TV foreign editor in 1993 and two years later became the bi-medial foreign editor across domestic TV and radio.

In 1996 he was asked to merge the newsgathering operations of the World Service and the domestic News and Current Affairs, becoming world news editor, the first person to take charge of the BBC's entire foreign newsgathering operations.

Influenced by the deaths and injuries of colleagues—he was with Martin Bell in Sarajevo when he was injured—Vin was instrumental in helping introduce safety equipment, courses and counselling services across the industry.

In 1999, as executive editor, he was asked to look at improving the storytelling skills of the BBC's reporters and correspondents. He also had responsibility for recruiting and coaching on-air talent for BBC News and gave many of the BBC's best known correspondents their first jobs in foreign news.

He was described as 'a revered teacher' by Andrew Marr who, along with many others, he trained and coached through his transition to broadcasting.

== Authorship ==
Vin Ray is the author of two books:

- The Reporter's Friend
- The Television News Handbook
