= Nabi Misdaq =

Afghan writer and journalist

Nabi Misdaq (Pashto: نبي مصداق) is an Afghan author and a journalist. He was the founder and head of the Pashto Section at BBC World Service in the early 1980s. In 2015, by special decree, and under the 64th article of the constitution, President Ashraf Ghani Ahmadzai, named Nabi Misdaq as his new Media Affairs advisor.

== Origins and education ==
Misdaq is from the Zazi tribe of Pashtuns, in the Paktia Province of Afghanistan. He went to the United Kingdom on a scholarship in the early 1960s. Misdaq has a BS.c. Hon. from London School of Economics and M.A. and Ph.D. from Sussex University. He has written several books (Afghanistan, Routledge, 2003) and academic papers in English. Recently he finished a Pashto-English dictionary which is due to be published. In the meantime, he is writing a book which contains Afghan jokes translated into English. He is also the author of many articles widely for Afghan exile press in both Pashto and Dari (Persian) over the years.

== Career ==
Misdaq worked for the BBC World Service at Bush House throughout the 1980s and 1990s, where he founded the Pashto Section, and broadcast regularly, becoming one of the best known voices in Afghanistan and Pakistan. He twice interviewed the exiled Afghan King Zahir Shah in Italy.

== Sources ==
- Misdaq, Nabi - Afghanistan: Political Frailty and External Interference ISBN 978-0-415-47024-7
- Fields, Rona M. - Martyrdom: The Psychology, Theology, and Politics of Self-Sacrifice ISBN 978-0-275-97993-5
- Maley, William - The Afghanistan Wars ISBN 978-0-333-80291-5
- Rais, Rasul Bakhsh - War without Winners: Afghanistan's Uncertain Transition after the Cold War ISBN 978-0-19-577535-8
