= Atia Abawi =

American author and television journalist (born 1982)

- Born: 9 August 1982 (age 44); West Germany
- Education: Virginia Tech
- Occupations: Author and journalist
- Spouse: Conor Powell

Atia Abawi (born 9 August 1982) is an American author, DEI speaker and television journalist. She worked as a foreign correspondent in Afghanistan and was based in Kabul for nearly five years. Her debut novel, The Secret Sky: A Novel of Forbidden Love in Afghanistan, was published by Penguin Random House in September 2014. Abawi has written about women's rights and gender issues in Afghanistan. She is fluent in Dari and is a graduate of Virginia Polytechnic Institute and State University.

== Early life ==
Abawi was born in West Germany, to Afghan parents who fled Afghanistan following the Soviet Invasion of Afghanistan. She was raised in the United States. After graduating from Annandale High School, Abawi went to Virginia Tech. After graduating from Virginia Tech, Abawi worked as a reporter CTV 76, a local TV station in Largo, Maryland, before moving to Atlanta to work for CNN and then NBC News.

== Career ==
=== CNN ===
At CNN, Abawi started in the Media Operations department before working her way up to producer and then to foreign correspondent. In 2008, she was named CNN's Afghanistan correspondent and manager of its Kabul bureau. Before Afghanistan, she worked on several prominent international stories including the assassination of former Pakistani Prime Minister Benazir Bhutto, the 2007 South Korean hostage crisis in Afghanistan and Youssif, the young Iraqi boy burned by insurgents in Iraq.

While in Afghanistan, Abawi embedded with U.S., NATO and Afghan forces numerous times, including during the major U.S. and ISAF military operation in Marjah, Afghanistan in 2010.

Outside of Afghanistan, she was part of a CNN team that had to sneak into Myanmar to cover the trial of Aung San Suu Kyi. Abawi also led CNN's coverage from Jerusalem of the Gaza Flotilla attack of 2010 by Israeli forces.

=== NBC News ===
In 2010, NBC News hired Abawi as its Afghanistan correspondent and bureau chief. Additionally, she reported from London as part of NBC's Royal wedding coverage, and was a part of the NBC News special coverage following the U.S. raid that killed Osama bin Laden, providing analysis and commentary. In 2012, Atia interviewed Afghan President Hamid Karzai - the first interview of the Afghan President for the network in a decade.

After nearly five years of living and working in Afghanistan, Abawi moved to Jerusalem in January 2013. In that year, she covered U.S. President Barack Obama's historic trip to Israel, the 2013 Egyptian coup d'état, and the Westgate shopping mall attack by Al-Shabaab militants among other stories.

Abawi has also written articles for the National Review and The Huffington Post about Islam and Afghanistan. Abawi has also spoken publicly about difficulty female journalists face in war zones and conflict areas.

== Works ==
=== The Secret Sky: A Novel of Forbidden Love in Afghanistan (2014) ===
Based on her experiences in Afghanistan, Penguin Books published Abawi's first book The Secret Sky: A Novel of Forbidden Love in Afghanistan. The young adult novel follows the forbidden love of two young Afghans, Fatima, a Hazara girl, and Samiullah, a Pashtun boy. Based on people Abawi met while living in Afghanistan, The Secret Sky shows both the beauty and the violence in current-day Afghanistan as Fatima and Samiullah fight their families, their cultures and the Taliban to stay together.

The Secret Sky has received acclaim for its accurate portrayal of Afghanistan, Islamic fundamentalism and for including diverse characters especially a strong female. The Amelia Bloomer Project included The Secret Sky on its 2015 list of books that provide a "glimpse at the diverse experiences of girls and women globally."

The Secret Sky was selected by the UK newspaper The Guardian as one of seven young adult novels that show the lives of teens across the world.

Publishers Weekly gave it a prestigious starred review calling it "a suspenseful, enlightening, and hopeful love story." According to Publishers Weekly, initial feedback of The Secret Sky from Afghan-Americans was positive, "yet Abawi felt some trepidation about potentially negative reactions to the novel, which is understandable given that, as a journalist, she has received death threats for writing articles about abused women."

While Kirkus Reviews said The Secret Sky has a "riveting plot, sympathetic characters and straightforward narration studded with vivid, authentic detail: a top choice."

Bustle listed The Secret Sky as one of "10 Young Adult Romance Novels Feminists Will Swoon Over," for its combination of feminism and romance.

=== A Land of Permanent Goodbyes (2016) ===
In December 2016, Penguin's Philomel Books announced Abawi's second novel, A Land of Permanent Goodbyes.

Set in war-torn Syria, A Land of Permanent Goodbyes centers on Tareq, "a Syrian teenager who, after losing most of his family in an airstrike, begins a harrowing journey with his sister to Europe."

A Land of Permanent Goodbyes was released in January 2018 and received positive reviews, earning three separate starred views.

With Kirkus Reviews describing it as an "unforgettable novel that brings readers to face to face with the global refugee crisis. A heartbreaking, haunting, and necessary story."

While Publishers Weekly called A Land of Permanent Goodbyes a "gripping and heartrending novel...and an upsetting yet beautifully rendered portrayal of an ongoing humanitarian crisis.".

And School Library Journal said "Abawi skillfully places humanity enmeshed in war into two sides: the 'hunters' who feed on the suffering and the 'helpers' who lend a hand. An inspiring, timely, and must-have account about the Syrian refugee disaster and the perils of all wars."

The New York Times Book Review called it "A heartbreaking fictional front row seat to the Syrian refugee emergency." A Land of Permanent Goodbyes was chosen by both Kirkus Reviews and the All Iowa Reading program selected it as its 2019 Young Adult book.

=== She Persisted: Sally Ride (2021) ===
Part of the #1 New York Times bestseller She Persisted series by Chelsea Clinton and Alexandra Boiger, She Persisted: Sally Ride was released by Penguin Books in March 2021.

=== Event Speaker ===
Atia is a regular event speaker at schools and organizations across the country. Often talking to students about Afghanistan, refugees and diversity and inclusion topic.

During the 2022–23 school year, the University School of Milwaukee welcomed her as its first-ever author-in-residence. Abawi visited the school on three separate occasions, in October, January, and April, with each visit lasting for two weeks. She worked with students and teachers in all three divisions, and hosted class visits and workshops that covered topics such as journalism, international relations, creative writing, news literacy, identity, refugees, and more.

== Personal life ==
Atia is married to former Fox News Foreign Correspondent Conor Powell. They were married on July 7, 2012, in Leesburg, Virginia. While at Virginia Tech, Abawi was a member of the Delta Zeta sorority.

== See also ==
- List of Afghan women writers
