= Homeira Qaderi =

Afghan writer, activist and educator (born 1980)

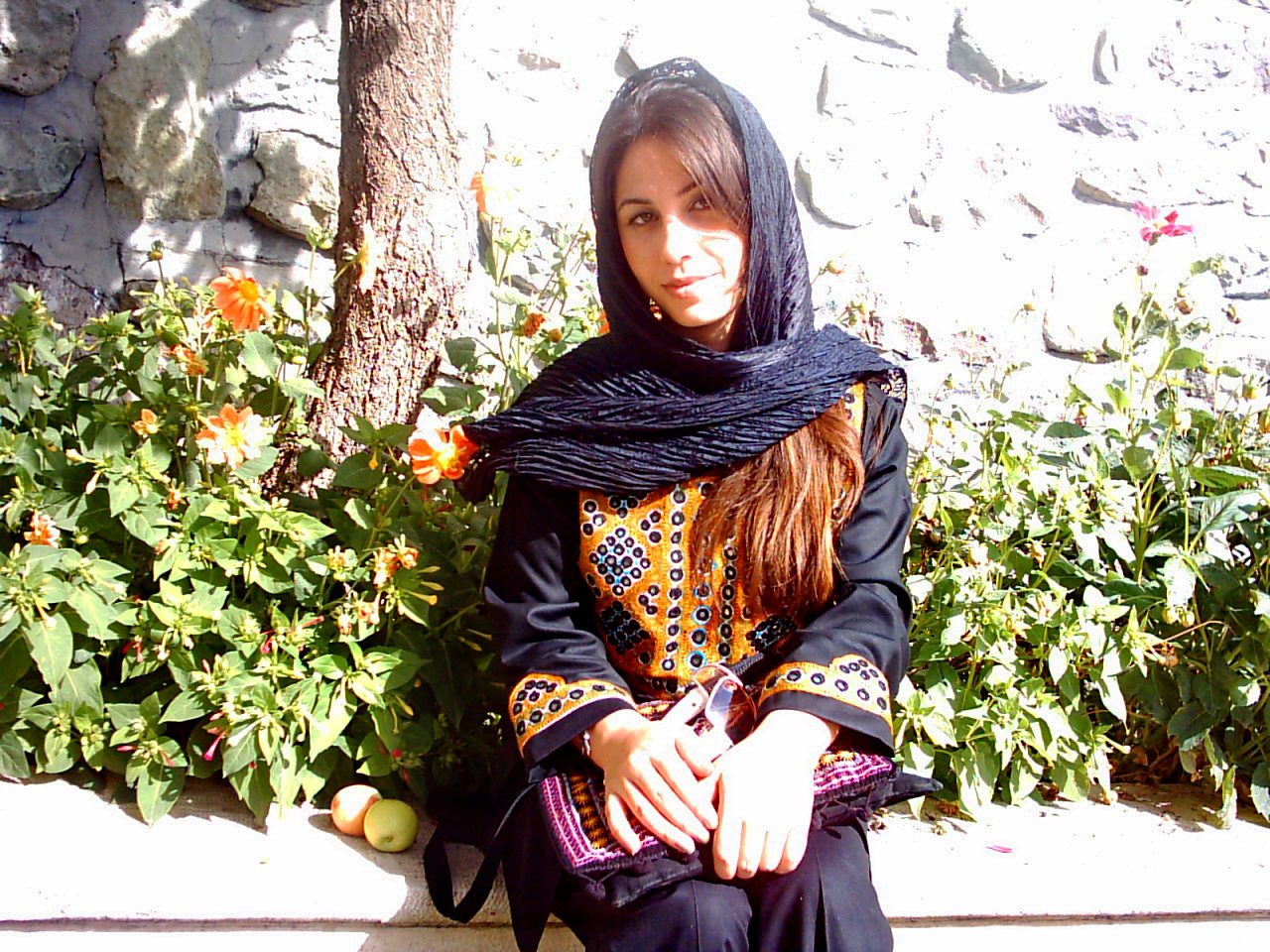
- Born: 1980 (age 44–45) Kabul, Afghanistan
- Genre: Academic, Literary Critic, and Novelist

Homeira Qaderi (Dari: حمیرا قادری, also spelled Homeira Qadari) born in 1980 is an Afghan writer, advocate for women's rights, and professor of Persian literature, currently serving as a Robert G. James Scholar Fellow at Radcliffe Institute of Advanced Research, Harvard University.

== Early life and education ==
She was born in Kabul, Afghanistan, during the Russian occupation to an artist mother and a high school teacher father. Qaderi's early childhood was spent first sheltering from the stray bullets of the invading Soviet army and then from the civil war following the Soviet withdrawal in 1989. After the Taliban took control of the country, girls were prohibited from attending school. Qaderi, then only 13, secretly organized basic literacy classes for her neighborhood girls and later for the children in the nearby refugee camp and taught them for four years. She also attended the Golden Needle Sewing School, a clandestine circle where she and other young girls pursued their education concentrating on literary writing skills under the supervision of Ustad Moahmmad Naser Rahyab. As a young adolescent, she published a short story, which was met with a strong rebuke from the Taliban.

In 2001 Homeira went to Iran and pursued her disrupted education. She earned a bachelor's degree in Persian literature from Shaheed Beheshti University in Tehran, Iran, in 2005, and a master's degree in literature from Allame Tabatabai University in Tehran in 2007.

Qaderi was a doctoral candidate at Tehran University when the 2008 Iranian uprisings took place. She joined political rallies protesting the Iranian government's suppression of basic human rights. As a foreign national, she was prohibited from participating in anti-government protests. Consequently, Homeira Qaderi was expelled from Iran without giving her a chance to complete her doctorate studies.

She later received a Ph.D. in Persian literature from Jawaharlal Nehru University in New Delhi, India, in 2014. Her doctoral dissertation was titled "Reflections of War and Emigration in Stories and Novels of Afghanistan". In 2015, she completed the International Writing Program at the University of Iowa in the US.

== Career ==
During her stay in Iran, Qaderi was the director of the Afghanistan Arts and Cultural Association in Iran, a position she held until 2008. After her return to Afghanistan, Qaderi began teaching as an assistant professor at Kabul University. Because of the demand for her literary skills and professional expertise in Persian literature, she also lectured at Mash'al University and Gharjistan University in Kabul. At the same time, she actively participated in civic rights movements focusing on gender equality in Afghanistan.

In 2011, Qaderi became an advisor to the Minister of Labor, Social Affairs, Martyrs Affairs, and the Disabled in Afghanistan. She focused her efforts on improving the living conditions of widows and orphans and established training programs for their self sufficiency. In 2018, she also served as the editor-in-chief for Rah-e Madanyat Daily. Qaderi was appointed senior advisor to the Minister of Education in 2019 and remained in that post until the spring of 2021. She is presently editor-in-chief of Ravi-e Zan and she is the founder of the Golden Needle Literary Association where she is training young women writers to become assertive in expressing themselves.

After the 2021 fall of Kabul, Qaderi left Afghanistan and moved to the United States where she became a Robert G. James Scholar Fellow at Radcliffe Institute of Advanced Research, Harvard University, writing on the experiences of young women under Taliban rule. In the aftermath of the fall of Kabul, Qaderi spoke out publicly about the dire situation in Afghanistan and the urgent need for the international community to support Afghan refugees and voicing her concerns about the rights of women and girls. She continues to be an advocate for human rights, women's rights, and for peace in Afghanistan.

== Literary work ==
Qaderi has published numerous articles, essays, short stories, and novels in both Persian and English, and her work has been translated into several languages. In 2003, three of Qaderi's stories, including Zair-e Gonbad-e Kabood, were published in Herat, Afghanistan. She was the only Afghan woman writer published in Afghanistan that year. In the same year, Qaderi received the Sadegh Hedayat Award in Iran for her short story titled, Baz Baaran Agar Mibarid, ‘If It Will Rain Again.' This was the first time ever that such a prestigious was award given to an Afghan national in Iran.

Some of her other published works include Goshwara-e Anis, (2005), and well-known novels like Iqlema (2014), Naqsh-e Shekar-e Aho (2012), and her acclaimed novel Noqra: The Daughter of Kabul River (Rozgar Publishers, 2009).

Her memoir, Dancing in the Mosque: An Afghan Mother's Letter to Her Son, was published by Harper Collins in 2020 and 2021 and translated into several languages including French, Italian, German, and Finnish. The book is written as a letter to Homeira's son, explaining the challenges she faced growing up in Afghanistan and the hard decision she had to make—in her divorce. Qaderi writes candidly about her childhood, marriage, and the challenges she faced as a woman and a writer in a society that often oppresses both. The book received critical acclaim and was a New York Times Notable Book of 2020. It was also longlisted for the 2021 Andrew Carnegie Medal for Excellence in Nonfiction and chosen by Kirkus Reviews as one of the best nonfiction books of 2020.

== Advocacy and awards ==
Qaderi has been recognized for her work as a civil society activist for women and children's affairs in Afghanistan and has participated in several international conferences, advocating for human rights. She took part in The Second Bonn International Conference on Afghanistan in December 2011, in Germany, speaking before the general assembly about the plight of Afghan women and their struggle for equal rights. In 2012, she attended The Tokyo Conference on Afghanistan, where over 100 countries were represented; as part of the Afghan delegation, she requested that other countries should assist the Afghan Government and support Afghan women. In 2014, Qaderi was a panelist at the International Labor Organization Conference in Geneva, Switzerland, where she advocated for the improvement of working conditions for women in Afghanistan.

Qaderi's activism and contributions to Afghan literature, culture, and society have been recognized with numerous awards, including the Sadegh Hedayat Award (2003), the Malalai Medal for Exceptional Bravery by the President of Afghanistan Ashraf Ghani (2018), and the Hellman/Hammett Grant from Human Rights Watch (2019).

Qaderi has been featured in several media outlets, including The New York Times, BBC, and NPR, Time magazine and People magazine where she has shared her insights and experiences as a writer, scholar, and activist. She has also been the subject of several documentaries, including The Afghan Women's Odyssey (2012), and The Women of Kabul (2014), and was the inspiration for The Secret Gate: A True Story of Courage and Sacrifice During the Collapse of Afghanistan (2023) by Mitchell Zuckoff.

== Selected works ==
- Dancing in the Mosque: An Afghan Mother's Letter to Her Son (2020)
- Aqlema, a novel (2015)
- Reflection of War and Exile in Stories of Afghanistan (2015)
- Naqsh-e Shekaar-e Aho, a novel
- Painting of A Deer Hunt – A Fable of Women and Men (2010)
- Silver Kabul River Girl, a novel (2009)
- Noqra, a novel (2009)
- 100 Years of Story Writing in Afghanistan (2009)
- Goshwara-e- Anis, Anish's Earring, a collection of short stories (2008)
- Noqre, the girl of Kabul river, a novel (2008)

== See also ==
- List of Afghan women writers
