= Wahida Faizi =

Afghan journalist

- وحیده فیضی
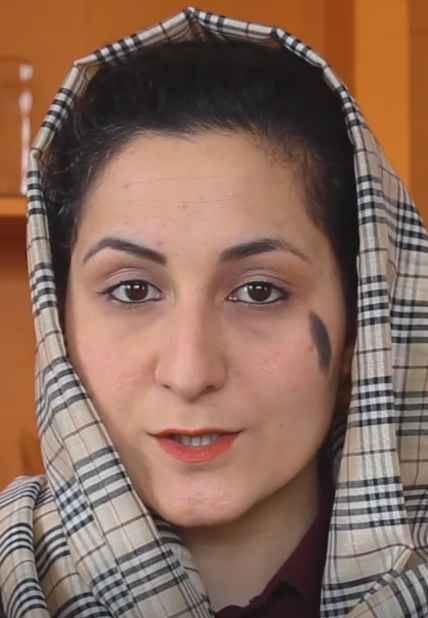
- Faizi in 2019
- Born: May 17, 1994 (age 32); Kabul, Islamic State of Afghanistan
- Other name: Heela
- Education: Mashal University, Kabul
- Occupation: Journalist
- Spouse: Tawfiq Waqef (m. 2021)

Wahida Faizi (Dari: وحیده فیضی) is an Afghan journalist who was head of the Women Journalist Section of the Afghan Journalists Safety Committee from 2015 until the fall of Kabul on 15 August 2021. She is currently working as a journalist at the Danish newspaper Politiken and is also a gender advisor at IMS.

== Life ==
She was born and raised in Kabul to a family originally from Parwan Province. She graduated from Maryam Secondary School in 2013 and continued her studies in political science at the Mashal University. She became interested in journalism in eight grade. While studying journalism, she worked in television and then on Radio Amuzgar as a speaker in educational programs. Faizi was selected as the 2015 best reporter by Nai (SOMA) Supporting Open Media in Afghanistan.

After graduating, she worked in news reporting for 4 years. Faizi focused on the situation of Afghan women and in 2016, joined the Afghan Journalists Safety Committee as head of the Women Journalist Section. The difficulties she faced during her career as female journalist in Taliban controlled Afghanistan prompted her to continue her activities under the pseudonym Heila for a period of time.

On August 26, 2021, after the fall of Kabul, she fled Afghanistan for fear that the Taliban would kill her because of her work.
