= Maryam Mahboob =

Afghan author (born 1955)

- Born: 1955 (age 69–70); Maimana, Afghanistan
- Occupation: Author

Maryam Mahboob is an Afghan author known for her writing on Afghan migrants, and on patriarchy in Afghan society. Mahboob was born in Maimana, Afghanistan in 1955. Due to her father's employment with the Afghan government, she experienced the lifestyle of Afghan women in different parts of the country. She completed her secondary education in Kabul, and attended Tehran University for her master's degree.

Following the Russian occupation of Afghanistan in 1979, Mahboob left the country to move first to Pakistan, and then to Delhi, India in 1981. Along with other Afghan expatriates, Mahboob started the journal Gahnama ("irregular journal") to express cultural resistance against both the communist government of Afghanistan and the Mujahideen. However, facing pressure from the Mujahideen amongst the Afghan community in India, she migrated once again to move to Canada in 1983.

Mahboob produced most of her major fiction works while in diaspora. Her works concentrate on the suppression and marginalization of women, while also expressing a revolt against the social norms and attitudes towards women.

== Bibliography ==
- Khana-i Delgir (A confined House) (1990) Kabul: Anjoman Newisendagan Afghanistan
- Gum (The Invisible) (1999) Toronto: Zarnegaar Publications.
- Khanum Jorg (short stories) (2003) Toronto: Zarnegaar Publications.
