= Layla Sarahat Rushani =

Afghan poet

Layla Sarahat Rushani (ca. 1952-54 – 21 July 2004) was an Afghan poet. Her first name also appears as Laila.

The daughter of Sarshar Rushani, a journalist who was executed by the ruling communist party, she was born in Charikar and studied at Kabul University. Her sister died in Australia and her mother died soon afterwards. She published a number of poetry collections, consisting mainly of modern Persian poems.

Rushani left Afghanistan for the Netherlands due to the persecution of women by the Taliban. She published a literary journal in Persian, Eve in Exile, there. She died of brain cancer in 2004.
