= Gender and International Aid in Afghanistan =

2009 book by Lina AbiRafeh

- Author: Lina AbiRafeh
- Language: English
- Subject: Western efforts to bring gender equity to women in post-Taliban Afghanistan
- Genre: Non-fiction
- Published: 5 Dec 2009
- Publisher: McFarland & Company
- Pages: 224
- ISBN: 978-0786445196
- OCLC: 428731308

Gender and International Aid in Afghanistan: The Politics and Effects of Intervention is a 2009 book by Lina AbiRafeh.

It documents and critiques western efforts to bring gender equity to women in Afghanistan after the 2001 United States invasion of Afghanistan. It notes how poor context analysis and weak cultural understanding by western aid workers were counterproductive to gender equity ambitions and is generally highly critical of their efforts. It concludes by sharing the perceptions of Afghan women: that they see no material benefit from the western efforts.

Gender and International Aid in Afghanistan was praised by book critics and noted for its strong critique of the western efforts.

== Production ==
Gender and International Aid in Afghanistan was produced in 2009 by McFarland & Company and written by Lina AbiRafeh.

== Synopsis ==
Gender and International Aid in Afghanistan documents gender equity efforts undertaken by humanitarian aid agencies as well as United States and NATO forces in Afghanistan after the 2001 fall of the Taliban and critiques the way that western forces sidelined the role of Afghan men with regards to women's empowerment.

The book starts by giving a history of gender issues in Afghanistan, noting the significance of gender relations in politics, and criticizing western powers for neglecting to acknowledge this as they went about their work.

It documents disparity between the progressive aspirations contained within United Nations Security Council Resolution 1325 and the Convention on the Elimination of all forms of Violence Against Women and the actual implementation of gender equity work in Afghanistan. Examples provided include the constitutional democracy agreement made by the United States, NATO and the Northern Alliance, which is described as "progressive" for its inclusion of references to Article Seven of the Universal Declaration on Human Rights and the Convention on the Elimination of all forms of Violence Against Women, existing in contrast to the actions of institutions mandated to enforce them, such as the Afghanistan police force. It documents how western attempts to enforce technical solutions to social problems of gender inequity fail and block local grassroots social change.

A key theme in the book is how western governments ill-advisedly interpret gender work to mean only working with women.

Fatima Mohammadi of Chemonics quotes page 27 in her 2017 paper published in the Asia Pacific Journal of Advanced Business and Social Studies: "gender has been conflated with women, and the language of aid programming has been oriented around women’s objectives, without a broader understanding of gender.”

The book suggests that narratives that ignore women's agency in Afghanistan are pushed by Western governments in order to justify their military interventions. It describes the western media's tendency to use images of "downtrodden" women wearing burqas to fuel aspirational narratives of "liberation" and "empowerment", and criticizes western interventions for bringing neither. The book criticizes the aid sector's tendency to portray women and children as "vulnerable" thus inhibiting their ability to be perceived as having more agency, reinforcing oppression.

The book concludes that Afghan women perceive that western efforts have not brought about any significant improvement in their situation with regards to employment, education, free movement or safety. The book criticizes income-generating programs due to their tendency to create employment opportunities for women that reinforce traditional gender-stereotyped jobs.

== Critical reception ==
AbiRafeh and the book are praised throughout Ben Walter's book Gendering Human Security in Afghanistan.

The book is described by Julie H. Smith in the Journal of Peace, Conflict & Development as a damning critique of the western attempts to bring gender equity to Afghanistan. Smith praises the author's "refreshing" critique of an intervention that she was part of.
