= Daud Junbish =

Afghan journalist

- Occupation: Journalist
- Years active: 1994–present
- Known for: Mullah Omar interviews
- Notable work: Open Jirga

Daud Junbish is a BBC journalist. He is one of the few journalists in the world who has met former Taliban chief Mullah Omar, and has interviewed him on multiple occasions. He is the author of What Is Really Happening in Afghanistan?, 24 Hours That Turned Afghanistan Around, and Red Army in Afghanistan.

== Life and career ==
Junbish completed his PhD from Moscow State University in the area of journalism.

Junbish joined BBC Moscow in 1994 as a reporter. He subsequently became a senior editor with BBC Radio for their Afghanistan service. Currently, he works with BBC's Afghanistan service as a producer.

One of Junbish's most notable meetings was in 1996, when he met the then Taliban head, Mullah Omar. Over the next few years, Junbish interviewed Omar multiple times for BBC. In August 2015, the BBC program The Fifth Floor interviewed Junbish in a special feature, covering the range of interviews Junbish had held with Omar.

Over his career with BBC, Junbish has written a number of books on Afghanistan, including What Is Really Happening in Afghanistan?, 24 Hours That Turned Afghanistan Around, and Red Army in Afghanistan. He has also written two textbooks for Kabul University's journalism faculty.

=== Open Jirga ===
Junbish is the presenter for the BBC program Open Jirga, a show featuring a panel discussion amongst notable personalities combined with audience questions. The show is funded by the UK government's Department for International Development and is jointly produced by the Afghan service of BBC, BBC Media Action, and Radio Television Afghanistan. Junbish, who launched the show in 2012 as a weekly series, has invited and featured prominent personalities like Sulaiman Layeq and Mohammad Mohaqiq in the discussion panels.

The issues taken up by Junbish in various episodes have been praised by various international media. BBC described the third edition of the show, hosted by Junbish, as including a "ground-breaking exchange". The Junbish-hosted series became so successful that Hamid Karzai, then the President of Afghanistan, sought an invitation to the show (Karzai was subsequently invited and appeared therein). Junbish's show is credited with influencing government and civil society action on various national and regional issues. Le Monde reported that over 2 to 3 million people were regular viewers of the show, a high figure for a nation with a population of around 30 million.
