= Miss Afghanistan =

Miss Afghanistan may refer to:

- Zohra Daoud (born 1954), the first official Miss Afghanistan - Miss Afghanistan 1972
- Vida Samadzai (born 1978), candidate in Miss Earth 2003
- Zallascht Sadat (born 1986), Miss Afghanistan 2009
