= Mirwais Jalil =

Afghan journalist

- Born: ca. 1969; Kabul, Afghanistan
- Died: 29 July 1994; Chelsitoon, Kabul, Afghanistan
- Cause of death: gun shot wounds
- Occupation: Journalist
- Employer: BBC World Service

Mirwais Jalil (1969 – 29 July 1994), was an Afghan journalist for the BBC World Service near Kabul, Afghanistan. Jalil has been praised for being crucial in the BBC's coverage of the Afghanistan civil war and as a highly credible journalist. On 29 July 1994, he was returning from an interview with Prime Minister Gulbuddin Hekmatyar when masked men kidnapped him, and Jalil was found murdered the next morning outside of Kabul. Jalil's aggressive coverage of the civil war between the mujahedeen was seen as authoritative and is said to be the reason of his fate.

== Personal ==
Mirwais Jalil was born the son of a medical practitioner in Kabul, Afghanistan in 1969. Growing up, Mirwais became fluent in Persian and Pashto, two main languages in Afghanistan. After Mirwais finished high school in Kabul, his family moved to Pakistan to escape the dangerous and volatile landscape that had erupted in Kabul. Mirwais took an English class and soon became a freelance reporter. His freelance reporting would soon land him a position with the BBC where he would cover the raging Afghanistan civil war that was waging in Kabul. Miwais enjoyed the excitement of covering the front lines in Kabul and his passion and authoritative reporting made him a valued journalists in covering the war in Kabul.

== Career ==
Mirwais Jalil began his short career in journalism by taking an English class in Pakistan. He began his career doing freelance journalism which would later lead to his position with the BBC. He soon became a key factor in the raging civil war that took place in Afghanistan in the early 1990s. At the time of his death, Mirwais was working freelance for the BBC's Pashto and Persian services. He had been with the BBC for less than 2 years but was well cultured and involved with the reports from the frontline. Mirwais was only 25 when he was killed but was often to referred to as vigorous and enthusiastic. He enjoyed being on the front lines in Kabul and would remain there even after others had retired for the day. Mirwais enjoyed showing other journalists around. The BBC has said that Mirwais was their top Afghanistan correspondent at the time of his death.

== Death ==
The capital of Afghanistan is Kabul.

Mirwais's life came to an end on 29 July 1994. Mirwais Jalil was returning from an interview with Gulbuddin Hekmatyar, Afghanistan's prime minister in 1994. Mirwais was travelling on a dirt road near Kabul with an Italian journalist, Ettore Mo from Corriere della Sera, when the Volkswagen was ambushed by a black sedan where five half masked figures jumped out and grabbed Mirwais from the car he was travelling in. He was brutally pulled from his backseat position in the car where he was dragged against his will at gunpoint and put into the waiting black sedan. The black sedan fled at high speeds away from Ettore and Sharif, the driver of Mirwais's car. Mirwais was the only passenger kidnapped. Those were the final moments anyone saw Mirwais alive. His body was found with multiple stab wounds and gun shots and was discovered only a couple kilometres from where he had been abducted near Chelsitoon, Afghanistan, a suburb of Kabul.

== Context ==
Chelsitoon is a suburb in the south of Kabul.

There was a civil war in full battle at the time of Mirwais's death. Gulbuddin Hekmatyar was engulfed in a fierce battle with the Afghan President Burhanuddin Rabbani over Kabul and strategic positions that both forces wanted to occupy. At the time of Mirwais's death in July, it had been reported that "1.5 million Afghans had already lost their life in the war," according to The New York Times. The fighting was the fiercest in Kabul for a number of weeks. After Mirwais's death, both Hekmatyar and Rabbani blamed the other party for his death. While the Afghan leaders and commanders enjoyed interviews, they were upset to have reports about their unfavorable war manoeuvres broadcast. This caused tension between journalists and the warring parties.

== Impact ==
Mirwais Jalil was one of many journalists killed in Afghanistan in 1994. His vibrant, young personality helped getting reports from the front line of the raging war that might not have other wise been reported. He also managed to be one of the first journalists to interview Hekmatyar since the Battle of Laghman. Mirwais Jalil was noted as having witnessed a loss for Hekmatyar's troop in a battle that the Prime Minister denied. He was very vocal in criticising Mirwais's reporting of the battle and Mirwais pointed out what he had witnessed. Mirwais was credited along with his fellow journalists, with giving the BBC a reputation for "objectivity" and is noted for performing a "vital job of informing his own and other people about the day to day realities of life and politics in Afghanistan."

== Reactions ==
After Mirwais's death, the editor of the BBC sent out letters to both Gulbuddin Hekmatyar and Burhanuddin Rabbani in an attempt to get better protection for the journalists covering the bloody war. The BBC refused to say who they thought was responsible for Mirwais's death. Prime Minister Gulbuddin Hekmatyar blamed President Burhanuddin Rabbani for the death of Mirwais, and President Burhanuddin Rabbani blamed Prime Minister Gulbuddin Hekmatyar. People from the United Nations and individual governments believed that Afghanistan was in so much turmoil that the country was beyond help and the world was now looking down on the devastation and destruction of Afghanistan.

== See also ==
- BBC World Service
