= Gaisu Yari =

Afghan human rights lawyer and activist

- Education: University of Virginia; Columbia University
- Occupations: human rights lawyer, women's rights activist, writer

Gaisu Yari is an Afghan human rights and women's rights activist, writer, blogger and speaker. She is considered one of the prominent campaigners for women's rights in Afghanistan. She is well known for her bravery for taking on the Taliban directly by questioning their policies.

== Biography ==
At the age of six, she was forced to become engaged to a six-year-old son of a pro-Taliban commander in eastern Afghanistan. She managed to escape to the United States with the help of American soldiers from the forced engagement after turning eighteen. She was initially set to marry the son of that Taliban commander with whom she was engaged and just two months prior to the marriage ceremony, she managed to get a visa to migrate to USA.

She decided to prioritize her focus towards her career progress and education during her stay in the US. She returned to her native country Afghanistan in 2015 and began working as a government civil service commissioner.

== Career ==
She obtained her master's degree in Human Rights from Columbia University her bachelor's degree in Middle Eastern and Gender Studies from the University of Virginia.

She served as a Commissioner in The Independent Administrative Reform And Civil Service Commission (IARCSC) in Afghanistan. She also worked as an Appeals board member of IARCSC in addition to being its commissioner.

She voluntarily advocates for the protection and safety of women in Afghanistan and has extensively worked for the wellbeing of Afghan women especially post Taliban takeover. She also engaged in getting more women participation in the Civil Service of Afghanistan.

She had maintained a low profile until she got to know about both her fiancé and father being killed by Taliban personnel. It was the turning point in her life that she decided to raise her voice against Taliban and condemned the organization for its policies. She also represents the Feminine Perspective Movement.

In August 2021, she escaped from Afghanistan following Taliban's return to power in 2021 and insisted that Taliban's return would be detrimental to her efforts on uplifting the civil service of Afghanistan.

In October 2021, Yari has been leading Afghan Voices of Hope and collecting emotional narratives of those escaped the Taliban and are in exile around the world.
