= Sahira Sharif =

Afghan politician

Sahira Sharif (also spelled Saira Sharif) is an Afghan politician who was elected to represent Khost Province in Afghanistan's Wolesi Jirga, the lower house of its National Legislature, in 2005.

A report on Khost prepared at the Navy Postgraduate School stated that she "was possibly associated with Hezb-e Islami". A member of the Pashtun ethnic group, she attended university and may have had a Master's degree. As a member of parliament, she sat on the Education Committee. A former Hezb-e Islami leader, she presented herself in 2005 as an independent candidate, and was believed to support the Hamid Karzai administration.

She is described as a women's rights activist.

During the 2009 presidential election, she supported Ashraf Ghani. In the 2010 Afghan Parliamentary Elections, she ran in Khost province as an independent. She is married to Sharif Zadran and has two sons and two daughters. Sharif founded Mirman Baheer, a literary society that meets secretly across Afghanistan.
