= Lina AbiRafeh =

Gender rights activist

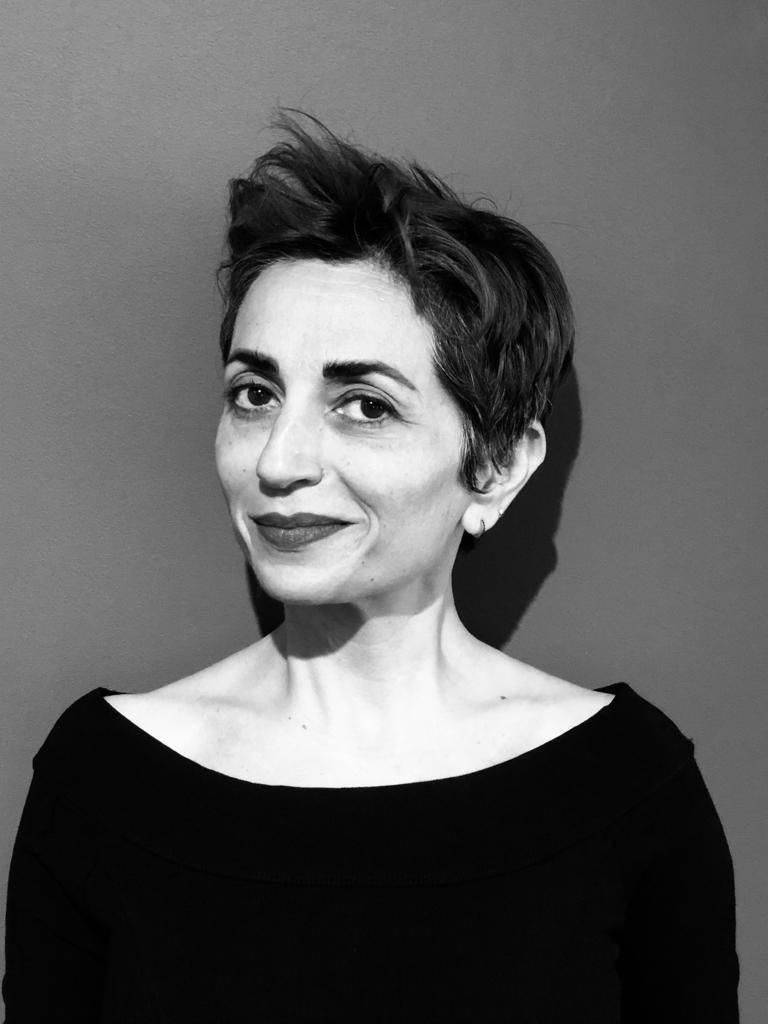
- Occupations: Feminist activist and author
- Awards: Apolitical's Gender Equality Top 100 (2018/2019)

Academic work
- Notable works: Yalla Feminists: Arab Rights & Resistance
- Website: https://www.linaabirafeh.com/

Lina AbiRafeh is recognised as one of the world's most influential women's rights experts. An Arab-American feminist activist and author, she works on gender issues in developing and humanitarian contexts around the world. She has worked for various United Nations agencies and international non-governmental organisations and was the executive director of the Arab Institute for Women at the Lebanese American University; she now acts as a senior advisor. Since 2022, she has acted in an independent capacity as a self-described “thought leader, opinion-shaper, and fearless changemaker for global women’s rights.”

She is the author of three books and over 100 articles on Medium. In July of 2025, AbiRafeh participated in an Oxford Union debate about the Arab Spring. She has also spoken to TedX and to international media outlets such as CNN, Al Jazeera, and Good Morning America.

== Early life and education ==
AbiRafeh was born to a Palestinian pharmacist mother and a Lebanese engineer father and spent her early years in Saudi Arabia while growing up before moving to northern Virginia at age 10.

AbiRafeh attended Boston College for her undergraduate degree and has a master's degree in international relations from the Johns Hopkins University.

She completed her PhD in development studies at the London School of Economics and Political Science in 2008, her thesis focusing on gender-focused aid in Afghanistan in the aftermath of the Bonn Agreement.

== Career ==
AbiRafeh has worked as a gender-based violence in emergencies specialist with various United Nations and humanitarian organisations in countries such as Afghanistan, Central African Republic, the Democratic Republic of the Congo, Haiti, Lebanon, Nepal, and Papua New Guinea. She was the executive director of the Arab Institute for Women at the Lebanese American University from 2015 to 2022.

She also regularly acts in an advisory capacity for a multitude of public and private organisations including a range of United Nations agencies and the Arab Institute for Women on issues relating to gender-based violence and gender equality. She serves on the international advisory board of many organizations, including Global Institute for Women’s Leadership, Forced Migration Review, Society of Gender Professionals, and the Global Women’s Institute.

In 2022, AbiRafeh founded Better4Women, a boutique advisory firm delivering practical and innovative solutions for gender equality, where she is the firm's Founder and Chief Changemaker.

== Awards ==
In 2018 and 2019, AbiRafeh was identified by Apolitical Group as one of the top most influential people in gender equity policy. In 2021, she received a Vital Voices fellowship for outstanding women leaders. She was also recognized by the Women’s Media Center as one of their Progressive Women’s Voices for 2021, and she is featured in their database of experts. AbiRafeh was awarded a Women in Power fellowship for 2022, and Council on Foreign Relations and British-American Project fellowships in 2023.

== Selected publications ==
- Linda AbiRafeh, Burn it Down, Build it Better: A Woman's Guide to Ending Workplace BS, 2025.
- Lina AbiRafeh & Rebecca O'Keeffe, Yalla Feminists: Arab Rights and Resistance, 2023. ISBN 978-1476691152
- Lina AbiRafeh, Gender and International Aid in Afghanistan: The Politics and Effects of Intervention, 2009. ISBN 978-0786445196
- Lina AbiRafeh, Freedom on the Frontlines: Afghan Women and the Fallacy of Liberation, 2022, ISBN 978-1476689425
