= Zan TV =

Afghan television channel for women

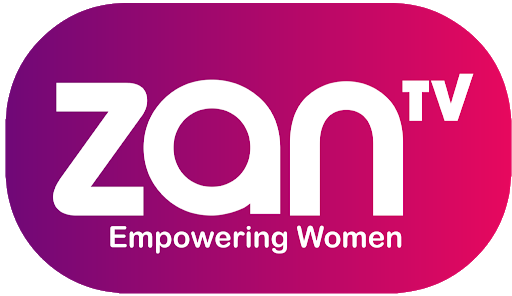
- Country: Afghanistan
- Network: Zan TV
- Headquarters: Kabul

Programming
- Language(s): Dari, Pashto

Ownership
- Owner: Hamid Samar

History
- Launched: 2017

Links
- Website: www.zantvnetwork.com

Zan TV (Women TV/تلویزیون زن in Dari) is an Afghan television channel that almost exclusively employs women, and offers programming that especially addresses issues relevant to women in Afghanistan. Founded by Hamid Samar, a media entrepreneur, in Kabul in 2017, Zan TV was the first station of its kind in Afghanistan.

== History ==
Upon its founding, about half of the women hired for the station were already qualified, and the rest planned to learn on the job. This was because most Afghan media and TV companies would not historically hire women, so they had had limited opportunities to develop media skills. Staff have included Nasrine Nawa, director of news programming, Yasamin Yarmal, host of a daily show, Khalida Rashid, a political reporter, Shabana Noori and Basira Joya, news anchors, and Mehria Azali, a journalist and producer of the station's political programming.

Within three months of its launch, Samar reported that the station had 90,000 viewers for its morning programs. The Guardian wrote upon its founding: "It’s a radical initiative for a country where the television industry is run solely by men and where just 16 years ago, journalism and even access to education for women were banned." However, some journalists are worried for their safety, and some face criticism from their families and communities.

In 2019, Zan TV reporter Najwa Alimi received the Per Anger Prize, an award instituted by the Government of Sweden and awarded to human rights defenders.

Canadian filmmaker Brishkay Ahmed profiled the station and its staff in the 2021 documentary film In the Rumbling Belly of Motherland.

== Programming ==
The station broadcasts news programmes and a variety of other shows, including cookery, entertainment, and discussion shows. In particular, it focuses on topics that are of interest of Afghan millennial women, such as feminism in the context of Islam, reproductive rights, domestic violence, women in the workplace, and family life. Interviews with Afghan female politicians and activists, such as Fareeda Kuchi Balkhi and Selay Ghaffar, are also included. Although the programming includes segments on topics that were banned under the Taliban rule, such as cosmetics and women in sports, the stated goal according to Mehria Azali is to work within the framework of Afghan culture and the existing laws.

== After 2021 ==
In August 2021, with the Taliban coming to power in Afghanistan, Zan TV temporarily suspended broadcasting. Despite the restrictions imposed by the Taliban on women's activities in Afghanistan and on the media, Zan TV continued work, endeavouring to be the voice of Afghan women, under the management of Maryam Naiby and with the support of Hamid Samar.
