= Janullah Hashimzada =

Afghan journalist

Janullah Hashimzada (1969 - 24 August 2009) (جان الله هاشم زاده) was an Afghan journalist and bureau chief in Peshawar, Pakistan for the Afghanistan Shamshad TV channel. He was an outspoken critic of the Taliban.

== Career ==
In addition to his work for Shamshad TV where he was a familiar face, and Pajhwok Afghan News, Hashimzada was also a freelance journalist to international media organizations, including the BBC, supplying frontline footage from the dangerous militant and insurgency areas of Pakistan. He spoke Arabic, Urdu, English, Pashto and Dari and interviewed several Taliban, Hezb-e-Islami Gulbuddin and Al Qaeda commanders and criticized their policies in his reports.

== Death ==
On Monday August 24, 2009, while returning from Afghanistan to Pakistan by bus, Hashimzada was assassinated in the Khyber Pass, the mountain pass that connects Pakistan and Afghanistan near Jamrud in the Khyber tribal area. The bus on which he was riding was intercepted by militants (presumably Taliban) riding in a Toyota Corolla who used the car to cut the bus off and stop it. The militants then entered the bus and shot only Hashimzada dead, then fled. His body was taken to a hospital in Jamrud.
