= Mashal University =

Private university in Kabul, Afghanistan

- پوھنتون مشعل
- Other names: MU
- Type: Private
- Established: 2009
- Founders: Fatehullah Babaker Khail
- Chancellor: Prof. Hameed ullah Amin
- President: Fatehullah Babaker Khail
- Location: Kabul, Kabul, Afghanistan
- Campus: Share-now-Kochai Gul Proshi
- Language: English, Dari and Pashto
- Website: mashal.edu.af

Mashal University is private university established in 2009, located in the city of Kabul, Afghanistan.

== Notable graduates ==
- Mina Mangal
