= Mina Mangal =

Afghan journalist, political advisor, and women's rights activist (1992–2019)

Mina Mangal (also transliterated Mena Mangal) (born 1992; died 11 May 2019 in Kabul, Afghanistan) was a prominent Afghan journalist, political advisor, and women's rights activist.

== Life and career ==
Mangal was born the eldest of six siblings (5 sisters, 1 brother) in Afghanistan. Before her journalistic career, she trained as a midwife and studied law, becoming interested in poetry and writing. She studied journalism at the Mashal University in Kabul, Afghanistan.

Mangal worked a number of jobs to financially support her siblings' education. Mangal gained popularity as a host on the television programmes of Tolo TV, Shamshad TV, Lemar TV, and the Ariana Television Network. She became known as a feminist and an advocate for women's rights in Afghanistan, particularly with regard to education and employment.

Her arranged husband and his family saw Mangal's work and outspokenness on women's issues as a threat to their honour, and she had to leave her first job after he became violent towards her. A spokesperson for the Attorney General's Office told the BBC that the family had filed a complaint alleging domestic violence at the time. The couple were married for 10 years, but formally divorced following a lengthy appeal to the Human Rights Commission on the basis that Manga's life was in danger in his company. However, the former husband and his family continued to harass Mangal, urging them to remarry. Mangal's family allege the husband drugged Mangal and forcibly took her to Paktiya Province, where they tortured and beat her. Mangal's father says they eventually secured her release "with the help of some government officials and tribal elders".

Prior to her death, she was a cultural commissioner to the House of the People, the lower house of the National Assembly.

== Death ==
According to a spokesperson of the Interior Ministry, Mangal was shot dead in broad daylight on the morning of 11 May 2019, in southeast Kabul. The spokesperson said that one or more assailants escaped the scene. It is unknown whether the murder was a terrorist attack or so-called honour killing; the family suspect that Mangal's ex-husband or his family were involved, and filed a complaint against the former husband and his parents. The former husband was also a police suspect immediately after the crime. She was 26 years old.

In the days preceding the shooting, Mangal had detailed a number of threats made to her on Facebook. However, the police and authorities did not offer her protection. The circumstances of her death were criticised by Afghan women's rights activists such as Wazhma Frogh, who said "This woman had already shared that her life was in danger; why did nothing happen?", adding: "Why is it so easy in this society [for men] to keep killing women they disagree with?". Canadian prime minister Justin Trudeau called the killing an "unacceptable tragedy", and the US Embassy in Kabul also offered their condolences.

Her death was described by women's rights activists and parliamentary colleagues as part of a series of daylight killings of women in public life in Afghanistan, with many of Mangal's former colleagues calling for greater protection for women journalists. According to the Committee to Protect Journalists, 13 women journalists were killed in 2018 in Afghanistan, the most recorded in a single year. According to The Coalition For Women In Journalism Mina was one of five women journalists killed so far in 2019.

== See also ==
- List of journalists killed during the War in Afghanistan (2001–present)
