= Zakia Zaki =

Afghan journalist

- Born: ca. 1972; Afghanistan
- Died: June 4, 2007; Jabal Saraj, Jabal Saraj District, Parwan, Afghanistan
- Cause of death: Shot and murdered in her home while sleeping. Two of children were present in the room while the murder took place.
- Occupation: Journalist
- Years active: 8 years
- Employer: Afghan Radio Peace
- Known for: First female journalist to speak out against the Taliban in Afghanistan.
- Spouse: Abdul Ahad Ranjabr
- Children: Zaki and her husband Abdul had six children together.

Zakia Zaki (c. 1972 – June 4, 2007) was an Afghan journalist for the Afghan Radio Peace (Sada-i-Sulh) station north of Kabul, Afghanistan. She had been given threats on account of her work and was killed at her home outside of Kabul in April 2007. Zaki was the first Afghani journalist to speak out against the Taliban after the US forces initiated the War in Afghanistan (2001–present), while she also championed other causes like gender equality and women's rights in Afghanistan. Her murder was seen as part of a series of recent attacks against high-profile Afghan women.

== Personal ==
Zakia Zaki was known for being independent and an activist in her community. While she was the founder of the Afghan Peace Radio station, the 35-year-old woman was also the headmistress at a local school. She and her husband Abdul Ahad Ranjabr had six children—four sons and two daughters—and two of her children were present at the time of her murder. The family resided about 40 miles north of Kabul in Parwan.

== Career ==
Zaki was founder and an active journalist at the Afghan Peace Radio (Sada-i-Sulh) in Jabal Saraj, Jabal Saraj District, Parwan, Afghanistan. The station was U.S. funded and often spoke out on controversial issues such as women rights and the Taliban insurgency. The United States secretly funded 6 hours of the station's broadcasting every day. France paid for the first year of production and 15 days of radio training for Zaki. Afghan Radio Peace was started in October 2001 after the initial fall of the Taliban. Local warlords and conservatives wanted to shut down the radio station, and Zaki received deaths threats in the days leading up to her assassination. Aside from being a journalist, Zaki was also a school teacher and ran for parliament in 2005.

== Death ==
Location of the place where she was killed in the capital Kabul.

Zaki was killed in her home outside of Kabul in April 2007. Before her murder, Zakia Zaki had received threats to shut down her radio station and on her life. On June 4, 2007, around midnight, three men armed with handguns and rifles entered Zaki's family home and shot her 7 times in the head and the chest while she slept and then fled. Two of her six children were in the room but left unharmed. Zaki's 8-month-old son was in bed with her. It was her 7 or 8-year-old son who called her husband and informed him of Zaki's death.

Two relatives were accused by Zaki's father. The two men were detained but never charged with the crime. Two more men thought to be part of the group Hezbi Islami (which is also referred to as the Hezb-e Islami) and were detained but not charged. The actual three gun men involved in Zaki's murder were never identified.

Her murder was deemed a "terrorist attack" by the Afghanistan prime minister. Abdul Manan Farahi, director of Anti-Terrorism Operations in Afghanistan, said, the suspects arrested in the Zaki case are believed to be linked to the Hezb-e Islami.

== Context ==
Zakia Zaki was one of the few female journalists to speak out during the Taliban's reign. Shakaiba Sanga Amaj (sometimes spelled Shakiba) was another female journalist located in Kabul. Amaj was 22 years old and a fierce competitor of Zaki's. Amaj's murder took place only six days before Zakis's on June 1. The lives of women in Afghanistan improved slightly after the fall of the Taliban in 2001 but many still rejected the idea of women being in the public eye.

== Impact ==
Many officials believed that female journalists were being targeted so the guerrilla groups in the area could gain media attention and convey their threats to the public. One of the prevalent groups in the Zaki case is the Hezb-e Islami, which is the guerrilla group headed by the veteran warlord Gulbuddin Hekmatyar. The film "If I Stand Up", co-produced by UNESCO, included a portrait of Zaki in the documentary. Many independent and private media outlets and radio stations arose after the fall of the Taliban, and despite the backlash towards female journalists, the growth of these businesses continued. Though the Afghan Peace Radio station was never quite the same after Zaki's murder, a few more female-run stations were created to take its place. The Canadian organization, IMPACs, was responsible for pursuing and establishing these stations in rural Afghanistan.

== Reactions ==
Kōichirō Matsuura, director-general of UNESCO, said, "These crimes are all the more shocking because they not only undermine the basic human right of freedom of expression, but also the right of women to exercise a profession that is vital for the reconstruction of Afghanistan."

Her killing was condemned by U.S. First Lady Laura Bush.

A statement from Reporters Without Borders said, "Whether this savage act was linked to her work as a journalist or her civic responsibilities, it is vital that those who are responsible for this murder should be quickly identified and punished."

== See also ==
- List of journalists killed during the War in Afghanistan (2001–present)
