= Selay Ghaffar =

Women's rights activist

- سیلی غفار
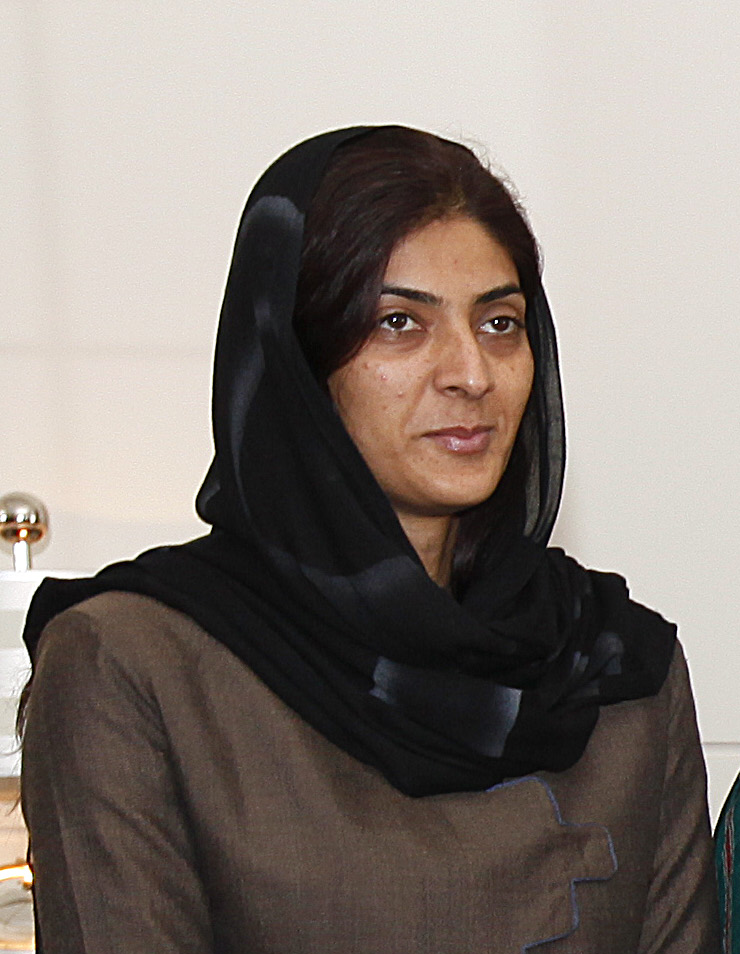
- Ghaffar during a meeting with several other Afghan politicians and Hillary Clinton in 2011.
- Leader: Public Figure

Personal details
- Born: Farah Province, Afghanistan
- Occupation: Political activist, Spokesperson for Solidarity Party of Afghanistan
- Known for: Criticism of the previous Afghan government, The Warlords and Taliban and the presence of US-NATO forces in Afghanistan.

Selay Ghaffar (Pashto: سیلی غفار) in Farah province in western Afghanistan. She is the daughter of a freedom fighter and left-wing intellectual. When she was 3-months old, her family fled Afghanistan to live as a refugee in neighboring Iran (then Pakistan). As she was born into an intellectual family, she grew up with high motivation to always fight and struggle for the rights of devastated people. She started her career as a social activist by helping Afghan children and women in refugee camps back in Pakistan.

"I saw children who had no shoes and not enough food to eat and I saw women who were repeatedly subjected to domestic and sexual violence. And even though I was only 13, it was then that my “career” in humanitarian work really began."

— Selay Ghaffar, August 11, 2011

Selay Ghaffar, being a political and women's rights activist, served to work for many national and international human rights organizations. She was the director of Humanitarian Assistance for the Women and Children of Afghanistan (HAWCA) that was established in 1999 back in Pakistan. During the era of Taliban, she was part of the group to establish literacy and science courses for girls and women in provinces such as Nangarhar, Laghman, Farah and Herat. During her career with HAWCA, she managed to provide free education and health care for numbers of children and women in many provinces, legal aid and protection to female victims of violence, she educated young girls in leadership tools, and she worked at different levels for women's human rights.

She is always critical of government and all warlords. She always addressed the root cause behind the violation of rights of Afghan people. She is well known as a pro-active activist, leading to her having an active role in most of the national and international conferences and events on Afghanistan like Bonn II, London Conference and others where she gave very critical speeches about the situation in Afghanistan. All this experience resulted in her becoming actively involved in politics as an opposition.

As a spokesperson of Solidarity Party of Afghanistan till August 2021, she was known for being outspoken against US-NATO occupation and warlords. In her TV debates, she reveals the devilish policy of occupiers and their Afghan minions, revealing the crimes of the government and other local warlords on Afghan people, defending the rights of women and ill-fated people, and inviting people for unity and solidarity. In most of her TV debates, she provided facts and figures about the crimes which happened or are happening in the Jihadist party (link of HRW and AI about mujahedeen) who are part of the government system getting threaten.

== Recognition ==
She is portrayed in the documentary "I am the Revolution" by Bernedetta Argentieri.
