= BBC Academy =

British Broadcasting Corporation department

The BBC Academy is an educational arm of the British Broadcasting Corporation which trains current and prospective broadcasting employees in the skills of the Broadcasting industry, in addition to training the corporation's own staff and prospects. A subsidiary of the academy, the BBC College of Journalism, functions as a free e-learning, online course series for all licence-fee payers.

== History ==
Its origins lie in a post-Hutton inquiry report commissioned by former BBC editor Ron Neil and Pricewaterhouse Coopers in 2004 which recommended a number of broad reforms of the BBC which included the establishment of a journalistic academy headed by an academic principal.

The BBC College of Journalism was opened as an e-learning course series in June 2005, with Kevin Marsh as Executive Editor. Its first Director was Vin Ray.

The academy, which joined together the curricula of training in Journalism, Production, Leadership and Technology, was opened for students on 14 December 2009, offering free masterclasses online to licence-fee payers and rival news media organisations.

== Structure ==
The academy is headed by Director Joe Godwin. Most campus courses are taught in BBC premises in central London, Salford and Wood Norton near Evesham in Worcestershire.

The College of Journalism provides all journalism training and development. It delivers editorial standards and legal training and core journalist craft skills as well as leading on international training.

The College of Production focuses on core editorial, creativity and production skills, together with production management, health and safety and multiplatform training and development.

The College of Technology‘s training ranges from media-specific courses, like those on High Definition television, Loudness and Final Cut Pro engineering support, to broader subjects such as software engineering and production management. A range of the College of Technology’s programmes are available to the wider UK industry on a commercial basis.

The College of Leadership focuses on building leadership and personal effectiveness skills across the corporation; it also takes the lead in the development of business and professional skills.
