= Soraya Alekozei =

Afghan-German interpreter and veteran

- Born: 1955 (age 70–71); Kabul, Kingdom of Afghanistan
- Allegiance: Germany
- Branch: Bundeswehr
- Service years: 2004-2011
- Rank: Oberleutnant
- Children: 2

Soraya Alekozei (born 1955) is an Afghan-German interpreter and veteran who was deployed to Afghanistan six times between 2004 and 2011 as a reserve officer in the Bundeswehr. Alekozei worked in military broadcasting and served as an interpreter for local politicians and German International Security Assistance Force officials. She founded an orphanage in Kabul. Alekozei was seriously wounded by an improvised explosive device in May 2011 and later authored a memoir about the experience in 2014.

== Early life ==
Alekozei was born in Kabul in 1955. Her first cultural connection to Germany was through her Western-minded grandfather who attended the German-founded Amani High School and was an official for the Afghan king. She married with Wali Alekozei. He was participated in a study abroad program and the couple relocated to Bonn in 1976 for his studies where their first of two sons was born. After suffering from homesickness, they returned to Kabul. Shortly thereafter, they returned in to Germany in December 1979 due to the Soviet–Afghan War.

== Career ==
Alekozei worked at Deutsche Postbank. As a reserve officer, she joined the Bundeswehr in 2004 against her children's wishes. Alekozei moderated an Afghan Bundeswehr broadcast and served as an interpreter for Franz Josef Jung and Markus Kneip. She fundraised and lobbied for donations leading to the opening of an orphanage in Kabul. During her sixth and final deployment, on May 28, 2011, Alekozei, a oberleutnant, served as an interpreter between local politicians and German ISAF officers at a security conference in Taloqan. During the conference, Alekozei was injured in an improvised explosive device attack that killed 16 fellow soldiers. She had 34 surgical operations after the event.

In 2014, she published a memoir about her experiences: Sie konnten mich nicht töten: Als Afghanin im Einsatz für die Bundeswehr [They Couldn't Kill Me: An Afghan on Duty for the German Armed Forces] (in German). Ullstein Ebooks. 30 September 2014. ISBN 978-3-8437-0918-7.
