= Sana Safi =

Afghan broadcast journalist (born 1989)

Sana Safi ثنا ساپۍ
- Born: 1989 (age 36–37); Kabul, Afghanistan
- Occupations: Journalist, News Presenter, Writer
- Employer: BBC
- Television: BBC Pashto

Sana Safi (Pashto: ثنا ساپۍ – born 1989) is an Afghan broadcast journalist, currently working for BBC World Service.

== Early life ==
Sana Safi was born in Kabul and brought up in Kandahar, Helmand, Nangarhar, and elsewhere in Afghanistan. Safi left Afghanistan in 2007 and by 2014 was living in the United Kingdom. She is fluent in Pashto, Dari, and English.

== Career ==
Safi lives in London where she works for the BBC. She started her career as a presenter/producer for a children's programme in the eastern Afghan city of Jalalabad before joining the BBC Afghan's Afghan Woman Hour programme and main current affairs transmissions later.

She is currently a presenter for BBC Pashto's TV show which is a half-hour show, made up of local, regional, and international news. Safi was the first journalist to speak to Afghanistan's Lebanese-American First Lady Rula Ghani in her first broadcast interview, after her husband Ashraf Ghani Ahmadzai took office.

Alongside Safi's journalistic work, she writes fiction.

== See also ==
- Afghans in the United Kingdom
