= Horia Mosadiq =

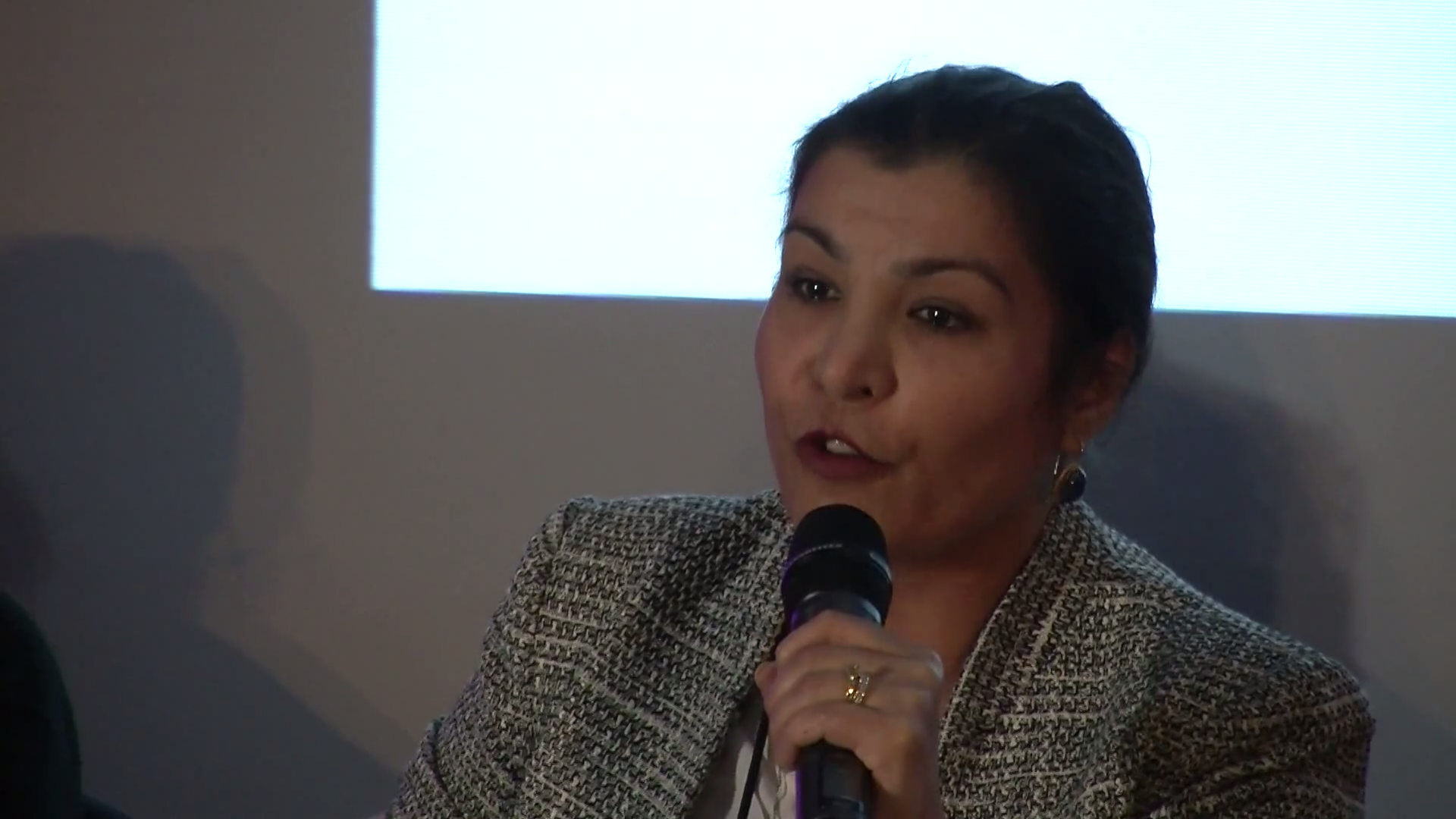
Mosadiq in 2014.

Horia Mosadiq (Dari: حوریه مصدق) is an Afghan human rights activist, political analyst and journalist. She has faced personal threats for her work as an activist and journalist. Mosadiq currently works for Amnesty International.

== Biography ==
Horia Mosadiq on “Religious Fundamentalism and its Impact on Women and Girls in Afghanistan”.

Mosadiq was a child when Afghanistan was invaded by the Soviets in 1979. Mosadiq started studying journalism at Kabul University in 1992. She was forced to stop attending college and left Afghanistan shortly after Najibullah's government was overturned. She and her family sought refuge in Pakistan in 1995, where she worked in Islamabad as a journalist for United Press International. Mosadiq eventually finished her master's degree in Public Relations from Berkeley University.

After the United States and Britain invaded Afghanistan in 2002, she moved back to her home country and began working for Amnesty International at its office in Kabul, which only stayed open until 2003. After that, she did various jobs for different human rights agencies. She also provided political commentary for Newsweek in 2004.

Mosadiq began getting threats from those who did not like her activism. In 2008, Amnesty International helped her and her family moved to London where she started working for Amnesty International under a work permit visa. Her husband had been shot at and her daughter's face slashed. Mosadiq says that "As long as the threats were directed to me, I didn't care because when you decide what to do, you are also aware of the dangers. But when everything was directed against my family, it was quite difficult to see your family paying for what you do."

Mosadiq currently works for Amnesty International as their Afghanistan Researcher. She first started working for them in this capacity in 2008. As a member of Amnesty International, she travels frequently between London and Kabul. Mosadiq provided the research for the Amnesty International report, "Fleeing war, Finding Misery: The Plight of the Internally Displaced in Afghanistan." She also reported to CNN news in an interview, that while human rights gains have occurred very slowly since 2002 in Afghanistan, Amnesty International has seen some progress over time.
