= Basira Joya =

Afghan television news anchor

- Born: c. 1999; Takhar Province, Afghanistan
- Education: Kabul University
- Occupation: News anchor
- Employer(s): Zan TV, Ariana Television Network

Basira Joya is an Afghan former television news anchor who fled to the United States in 2021 ahead of the Taliban's capture of Kabul in August 2021.

== Early life and education ==
Basira Joya was born in 1998 or 1999 to a family who lives in Takhar Province, in northeastern Afghanistan. Her father worked as a police officer. Basira studied economics at Kabul University.

== Career ==
Joya worked as a news anchor at the women-owned Zan TV before working at Ariana Television Network. During the Taliban's 2021 rise to power in Afghanistan, she spoke to The Independent newspaper about the slow evacuation of journalists from Afghanistan by European nations and the United States. The same year, she faced threats and went into hiding before fleeing to the United States, to live in Dayton, Ohio.

In Ohio, Joya took employment in a factory.
