= Najwa Alimi =

Afghan journalist

- Dari: نجوا عالمی
- Born: Fayzabad, Badakhshan, Afghanistan
- Awards: Per Anger Prize (2019); Anna Lindh Prize (2022)

Najwa Alimi (Dari: نجوا عالمی) is an Afghan journalist and human rights activist. She won the 2019 Per Anger Prize for her efforts supporting human rights and freedom of speech, In 2022, she was awarded the Anna Lindh prize. Alimi was born in Fayzabad, Badakhshan. She moved to Kabul to study chemistry and journalism. Alimi works for Zan TV and runs a book café with friends.
