= Fatima Rahimi =

Afghan-Czech journalist and radio presenter

Fatima Rahimi (born 1992) is an Afghan-Czech journalist and presenter of Hergot! on Czech Radio's Radio Wave.

Rahimi was born in 1992 in Herat. Her father was a Persian teacher before the Taliban jailed him. In 1999, her family traveled by foot, arriving in Czech Republic in 2000 where they lived in a refugee camp in Vyšní Lhoty for 3.5 years. The family was granted permanent residency in 2004 and moved to Šumperk. She studied transcultural communication at University of Hradec Králové from 2010 to 2013. Rahimi attended Charles University, studying the cultural and spiritual history of Europe and Iranian studies.

She is a journalist for Deník Referendum.

On the 2021 Taliban offensive, Rahimi shared that many Afghans did not trust the Taliban and that there were concerns about the welfare of women in Herat after the Taliban gained control there.

Rahimi is a naturalized Czech citizen. She resides in Prague. Rahimi identifies as a feminist and liberal Muslim.
