= Sea Prayer =

2018 illustrated novel by Khaled Hosseini

- First edition (UK)
- Author: Khaled Hosseini
- Illustrator: Dan Williams
- Language: English
- Publisher: Bloomsbury (UK); Riverhead Books (US)
- Publication date: August 30, 2018 (UK); September 18, 2018 (US)
- Publication place: United States
- Media type: Print (hardback)
- Pages: 48 pp (first edition, hardcover)
- ISBN: 9780525539094
- OCLC: 1078664280
- Dewey Decimal: 813.6

Sea Prayer is an illustrated novel by Afghan-American author Khaled Hosseini inspired by the Syrian refugee crisis and the death of Alan Kurdi. It was first created as a virtual reality experience in 2017, and was published as a book in 2018, illustrated in watercolor by Dan Williams.

== Plot ==
The book is written in the form of a letter from father to son; the two have fled their home in Homs, Syria due to the Syrian Civil War, and face the dangerous Mediterranean crossing.

== Reviews ==
Kirkus Reviews called Sea Prayer "intensely moving" and "powerfully evocative of the plight in which displaced populations find themselves." Publishers Weekly wrote that it "does not dwell on nightmarish fates; instead, its emotional power flows from the love of a father for his son."
