= Saeeda Mahmood =

Afghan broadcast journalist

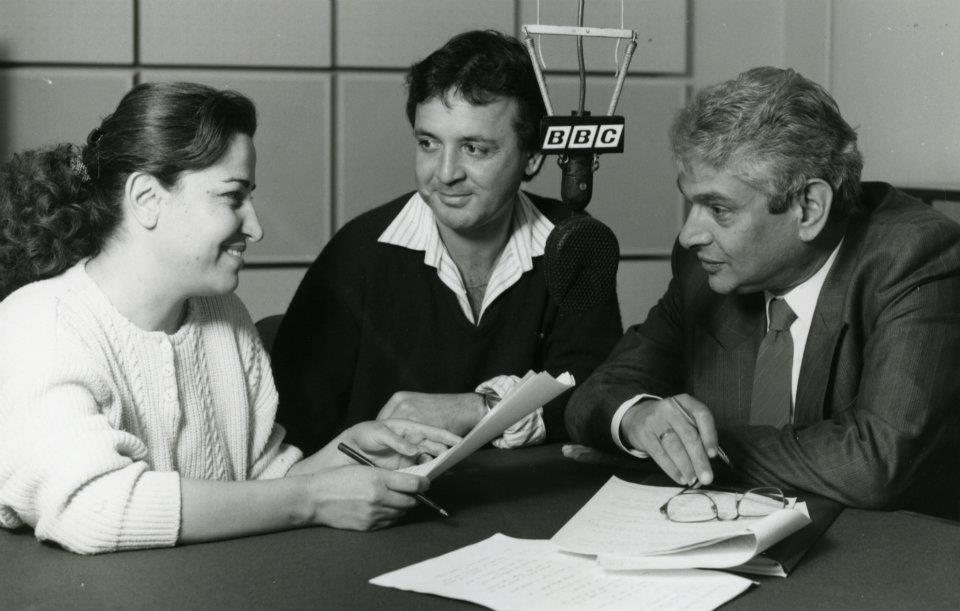
- Born: Helmand Province, Afghanistan
- Occupations: Journalist, presenter, newsreader
- Employer: BBC World Service
- Notable credit: Afghanistan Golden Age

Saeeda Mahmood is an Afghan broadcast journalist who worked for BBC World Service, Pashto Section for more than 25 years. Saeeda was born in Kandahar and brought up in the Helmand Province of Afghanistan. In the 1960s, Saeeda’s was the first Afghan generation to think about a higher education within the country, rather than abroad in Beirut, or Delhi, or Istanbul.

In 2015 Saeeda Mahmood became a live BBC radio presenter on a new expansion of BBC's Afghan services.
