= Zohra Daoud =

American TV celebrity, radio show host and journalist

Zohra Yusuf Daoud (Dari: زهره يوسف داود); (born 1954 in Kabul) is an American TV celebrity, radio show host, Miss Afghanistan (1972) and a journalist of Afghan descent.

== A social activist ==
Throughout her stay in America, Da, as she is commonly known, remained involved in the Afghan American community, using her spare time volunteering for her community's cause. In 1996 she co-founded the Afghan Women Association of Southern California, and she still hosts a radio talk show on the 24-hour Voice of Afghanistan. However, Zohra maintained a low profile about her former beauty queen status until 11 September 2001 when she grew weary of the media's treatment of Afghan women as illiterate, burqa-clad victims, and felt the need to speak out.

In that context, Zohra began her new project Women for Afghan Women, an organization to promote Afghan women's human rights, in April 2001. As a part of that project she also co-authored a book by the same name, that was edited by Sunita Mehta, and also featured contributions from Homaira Mamoor, Gloria Steinem and Eleanor Smeal and others.

Zohra also held negotiations with a Taliban delegation in the United States, being the first Afghan woman, and woman in general to hold such negotiations, at the beginning of their rule, to put the case for liberation for her sisters back home and has spoken at various Human Rights conventions and conferences, including the Afghan Women's Summit, that was held in Brussels in December 2001.

In June 2005, she was also speaker at the Afghan Arts & Film Festival organized by Afghan Communicator at California State University, Northridge where she emphasized the importance of Afghan art and culture.

== Life in Afghanistan ==
Zohra Daoud was born in 1954 in Kabul, Afghanistan. Her father was Afghanistan's U.S.-educated surgeon and her mother came from a well-recognized family. As the pageant gained fame in Kabul, she made an impression on television executives and radio hosts. When she went back to Afghanistan, she became a host of a TV show. It was a quiz show in which participants competed against each other on their knowledge of recent occasions. After her crowning at the age of 18, Zohra Daoud married Mohammad Daoud, a trained commercial airline captain.

== Miss Afghanistan ==
In December 1972, Zohra Daoud was crowned as Miss Afghanistan. Sponsored by Afghan Life Magazine, Daoud attracted approximately 100 contestants around the age of 20, a majority of them from Kabul. She was crowned by Rajesh Khanna. Daoud saw the pageant as an opportunity to promote high education and academic achievement for young Afghan girls.

== Early life in United States ==
In 1979, the Soviet Union invaded Afghanistan. A year later, Zohra Daoud, her husband Mohammad Daoud, along with their infant child, fled to West Germany. In 1980, she arrived at LaGuardia Airport, New York. With a degree in French literature from Kabul University, Zohra Daoud managed to get a job in a French bakery in Richmond. When she arrived at the job, she was handed a mop and sent to the kitchen to sweep the floors. Despite being a trained commercial pilot, Zohra Daoud's husband, Mohammad Daoud, worked in restaurants and then later as a taxi driver. Zohra and Mohammad Daoud later began taking English classes, tutorial and exams in order to improve their English language. Mohammad Daoud landed a job as a pilot for United Airlines. With their increase in income, Mohammad and Zohra Daoud assisted in the relocation of the rest of their family members into United States, as well as settling in their California home.
