= Shakaiba Sanga Amaj =

Afghan journalist

Shakaiba Sanga Amaj (Pashto:شکېبا څانګه آماج) (born 1986, assassinated 31 May, or June 1, 2007) was an Afghan female journalist. Born in Kabul, she worked as a broadcaster for Shamshad TV Channel.

The Pakistan-educated Shakaiba Amaj was a well-liked presenter on the programme "Da Gudar Ghara" on Shamshad TV. She also worked as a reporter. Shakaiba Amaj was one of the Afghan women journalists at news conferences with President Hamid Karzai.

The family had been getting anonymous letters, warning her father to keep his daughters at home. A grenade had also exploded in their yard.

Then a man broke into the family's house in Kabul on May 31 or June 1 and opened fire on the 22-year-old at point-blank range. Two days later police arrested a suspect, Abdul Latif from Ghazni, who had reportedly been hired to punish her for refusing to marry. "Even if a family feud appears to be behind this cowardly killing, the authorities should not overlook the profession and renown of the young presenter," said Reporters Without Borders, the worldwide press freedom organisation.
