= Pashto media =

Cultural media of the Pashtun people

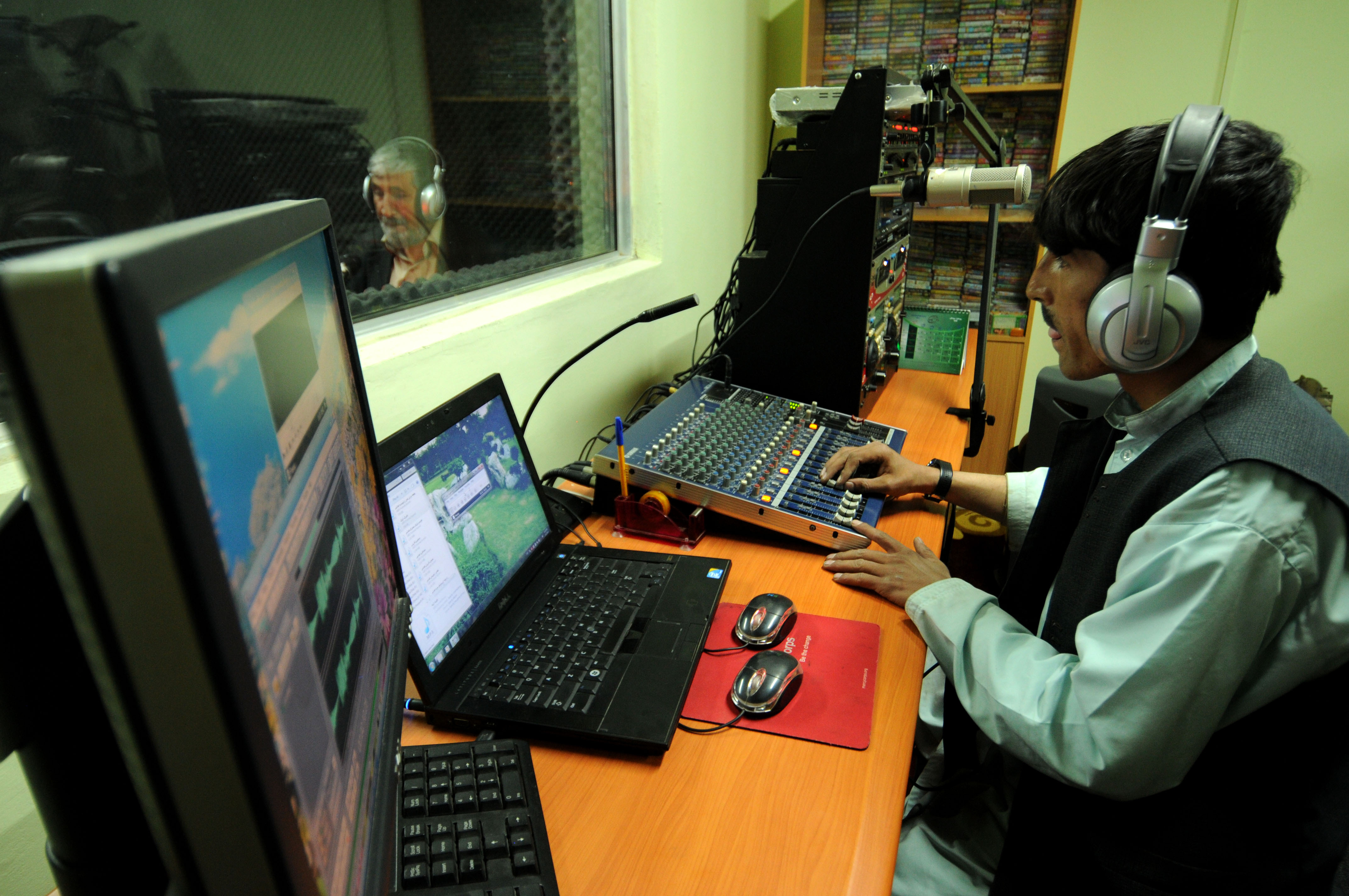
Inside a radio station in Qalat, Afghanistan

The Pashto media includes Pashto literature, Pashto-language newspapers, magazines, television and radio stations, as well as Pashto films and Pashto internet. Pashto media involves the Pashtuns of Pakistan, Afghanistan and the Pashtun diaspora around the world.

== Literature and poetry ==
Pashto is not only the name of a language, but it comprises all traditions, norms and values of the Pashtun people. The history of Pashto language comprises thousands of years. It is widely believed among the Pashtuns that the earliest written Pashto poems were written in the 8th century CE by Amir Kror Suri of Ghor, Afghanistan. Amir Kror was the son of Amir Polad and they belonged to the Suri Pashtun tribe. Since paper was not much in use in the Pashtun territory, Poets usually performed poetry verbally and its fans memorized the work. Another reason may be that most Pashtuns were nomads and warriors, thus lack writing skills. Due to these and other reasons, Pashto remained as a verbal language only. The poems by Amir Kror Suri were discovered and saved in Pata Khazana, a work compiled by Shah Hussain Hotaki and last edited by professor Abdul Hai Habibi from Kandahar. Abu Muhammad Hashim Sarwani was another poet of that period. He was born around the Helmand Province in the 9th century. He was the student of Ullema of Basat. It is also said that he was the student of popular Arabic writer, Ibn-e-Khalid. Hashim Sarwani translated some Arabic poems in Pashto, and his work also came under light through the book, Pata Khazana. He also wrote a book, SaloVagma, meaning ‘deserted breeze’ on the eloquence of Arabic verses. After Abu Muhammad Hashim Sarwani, Sheikh Razi is another poet whose work is saved in the book, Pata Khazana. He belonged to the Lodi tribe of Pashtuns. Similarly, there are many other poets in the first phase of Pashto poetry (i.e. Amir Nasir Lodhi, Beat Neeka, Ismail Ster Bani (son of Beat Neeka), Kharshaboon (cousin of Ismail Ster Bani), Sheikh Asad Soori and others).

Intellectual, scholars and critics divide Pashto literature into two parts, i.e. poetry and prose. Poetic literature like Amir Crore Nazam and Sheikh Mati Munajat were all in poetic form. Prose found its place in Pashto literature very late. The reason is that poetry is a far common and effective genre for translating and expressing one's feeling into it and conveying the same to others. However prose vis-à-vis poetry appeals to a very selective mind and heart. Now the question arises as to when prose writing came into vogue in Pashto literature. There are various profound claims and arguments regarding the origin of prose in Pashto literature like it having been originated as back as 223 Hijri in the form of translation of Arabic verses in book titled ‘SaloVagma’ (Deserted Breeze). Since the book is not vogue and the idea is based on mere assumption, it cannot be taken as authentic. Similarly, another book Tazkiratul Aulia, written by Suleman Makoo in 612 Hijri, is said to be the first recognized book in Pashto. The book contains descriptions of major Aulia, like Shiekh Malkair, Shiekh Ismial and Sheikh Bakhtiar. The complete book is not in existence but a part of it is available. However, the oldest complete prose book in Pashto that is still in existence today is Khairul Bayan. After that we come across Akhund Darvez’s book title Makhzanul Islam and various other books written in the 9th and 10th centuries by Babu Jan, Mlamast Zamand, Allah Yar, and Akhun Qasim. But all these books were in prose-verse as they contained difficult words and rhetorical expressions and poetic rhythms as well. After that comes the era of the great Pashto poet Khushal Khan Khattak, who along with his family has made a remarkable contribution to Pashto prose writing. His sons, one of his daughters, Haleema Khatak and his grandchildren (Khushaal Khan Khatak's) contributed to Pashto prose in an especially unique way. It was this period when prose was written in clear, short and easy to follow and comprehensible form. Then comes the period of some of the greatest prose writers Saleh Mohammad, Ghulam Mohyuddin Afghan, Zamarley, Maulvi Mir Ahmed Shah, and Abdul Rauf Qaney further contributed to the cause of Pashto prose in Afghanistan. To conclude, Pashto expressions far more exceeds prose collections in Pashto literature as prose needs special attention on the part of intellectuals and critics and as this very form of expression is less developed in prose vis-à-vis poetry.

=== Pashto Academy ===
The Pashto Academy was established during the mid-1950s in Peshawar, the capital city of Khyber Pakhtunkhwa. The founder of the academy was Maulana Abdul Qadir who since his student-life was very concerned about the future of Pashto language. He was a scholar in Arabic, Persian, English, Urdu and Pashto. The establishment of the academy helped give writers and intellectuals a platform, as well as helping the Pashto written word adopt a certain discipline. The academy publishes a quarterly magazine, Pashto, providing an establishment of appreciation for the Pashto prose form.

Positive impact of the Pashto Academy on Pashto literature: The Pashto academy has played an important role in the development of Pashto language as the total number of books published after the establishment of the Pashto Academy are many-fold more than the number of books published in the past 1200 years of literary history of Pashto language. To conclude, we can say Pashto literature, especially, Pashto poetry is on its peak as the Pashto poets are not afraid to write Ghazal, couplet or to do any kind of poetry, containing four, six or eight stanzas. The late historian, Khan Roshan khan from Swabi District along with Pashto Academy wrote the book, Tawarikh-e-Hafiz Rehmat khani.

== Newspapers and magazines ==
Syed Rahat Zakheili was not only a novelist and fiction writer of Pashto language, but Pashto first journalist who through journalism served the Pashto literature. To develop the Pashto literature, he started a weekly newspaper. Afghan and appreciated the Pashto poets and writers through the weekly. Unlike other language newspapers, Pashto journalism started to develop Pashto literature, so we can easily say that there was a strong link between Pashto literature and Pashto journalism and the journalism started to help develop the Pashto literature. The editor of the weekly, Afghan was Syed Abdullah Shah Kaka Khiel. Before Afghan Pashto journalism existed, but not in a regular and disciplined way. For instance, Al Jihad, a one-page newspaper owned by Abdul Ghaffar Peshawari used to be published under the editorship of Ghazi Abdul Ghafoor of Swat. Haji Sab Torakzai established a Litho press (printing press) in Tribal areas in 1915 during the ‘Jihad’ against Britain. Through this press, special kinds of pamphlets against Britain used to publish and distributed among the people of the tribal areas. Similarly, Al Mujahid was another Pashto newspaper that started publishing in 1923 under the editorship of Maulvi Muhammad Bashir. This newspaper also used to publish in the tribal areas and printed material against Britain. Zalmi Pashtoon was another daily newspaper which used to publish in 1933 and Hamdard Afghan published in 1929 under the editor ship of Khan Mir Hilali. During these days, Mohammad Nawaz Khatak started Watan which was a weekly newspaper.

Wahdat and Khabroona are the two main dailies from Peshawar, Pakistan. Wahdat started its publication in the 1980s during the Afghan war for the purpose to create a link between Pashtoons living on the Pakistan–Afghanistan border. Daily Qudrat is the only Pashto daily published in Quetta, Pakistan. Weekly newspaper BADLOON published by Mardan Editor Muhammad Zaman Adil in the Association of Writer Hands Media Group.

== Online news networks ==
Pashto Press Germany is also the first Pashto News website which is covering the Pashtuns Afghan Diaspora in Germany, and Provides news, articles, and Pashto & German Languages. Pashto Press Germany was founded by Noor Badshah Yousafzai in March 2016.

== Editorial policy ==
The editorial policy of the Pashto newspaper is free in a way that the paper is not under any kind of pressure from the government. Most of the material published in the editorial is Islamic. The newspaper mostly contains Islamic material. One page is a literature page comprising, editions related to religion (Islam). No such place has been given to sports or show biz news. Wahdat has no such magazine, etc., as a supplement. Wahdat is mostly read in cities of Peshawar, Mardan, Swat, Karachi and Kandahar. Khabroona is another daily newspaper of the Pashto language that started between 2001 and 2002. Khabroona is read in Peshawar, Mardan, Swat, suburbs of Peshawar, and in Kabul, Afghanistan. The editorial policy of the newspaper is quite free and liberal as well vis-à-vis Wahdat. The newspaper is not under any governmental pressure. The content of the newspaper is quite different from Wahdat, as it gives enough space to sports and show-biz news. As for its ad policy, the newspaper publishes government and private sector ads. The head offices of both Wahdat and Khabroona are in Peshawar.

The regular publication of magazines in Pashto language started when the owner of the weekly Afghan, Rahat Zakheili, started the magazine, Stari Mashi in 1931. During those days Pashtoon magazine started under the editorship of Abdul Khaliq. And then some other people found the environment conducive for magazines reading and started the magazines like Selab and Angar on regular bases. During the world war-II, a magazine, Nan Paroon was published from Delhi under the editorship of Maulana Abdul Qadir and barrister Nasrullah Khan. Khyber Magazine, a magazine published from Government Islamia College, Peshawar in the 1950s played a great role to project the views and problems of students on one hand and to promote Pashto literature on the other hand. Some other magazines which have their own fundamental and historical place in Pashto journalism are Qand, Adal, Qandeel and Tamas. These magazines have ceased publication. Monthly magazine KARAHMAR published from Peshawar editor Muhammad Zaman Adil in Association of Writer Hands Media Group.

Noor-ul-bashaf Naveed publishes the magazine Likwal. Pashtun is claimed by Awami National Party. One of the most popular Pashto magazines is Pasoon, headed by Dr Israr. Watan and Mashal are the other two Pashto magazines

== Radio ==
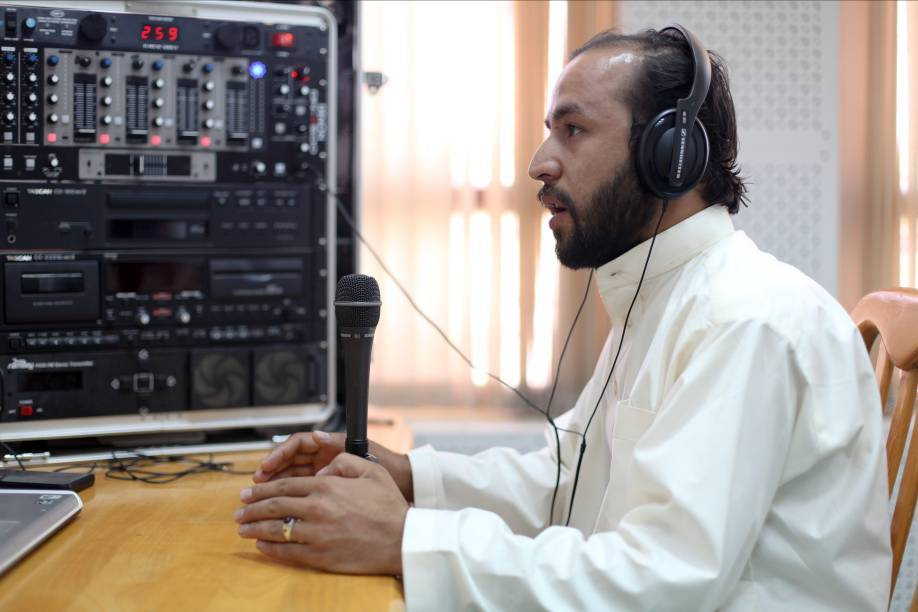
A local radio personality for the Voice of Maiden in Wardak province of Afghanistan.

Radio Kabul is the official radio station of Afghanistan. The first radio transmitters were installed in Kabul in the 1920s. King Amanullah Khan installed a 200 watt Russian transmitter opejjgandi khan khel rating at AM 833 kHz at his Kabul Palace in 1925. The transmitter was replaced in 1931 by King Nadir Khan, and was upgraded during Zahir Shah's reign in 1940 when a new 20 kilowatt transmitter was installed in its place, operating at 600 kHz.

In the meantime, Radio Pakistan, Peshawar started its programs in 1935. The first word broadcast from the station was Kalma-e-Tauheed. Radio had great importance at the time because there were limited newspapers and no televisions, people listened to radio not only for news but for entertainment purposes as well. Radio has an important role in the lives of the Pashtun people. Since the literacy rate is low among them, every family has a radio set in their house. Even the women in rural areas are informed and entertained by radio.

Stations like FM Boraq and FM 101 are heard in Khyber Pakhtunkhwa. The private radio stations usually discuss the problems of youths, and as a result of which they listen to it and owing to this, these private stations get more funds as compared to the stations supervised by the government. Radio Pakistan in Peshawar played a huge role in the development of Khyber Pakhtunkhwa. Not only does it broadcast entertainment programs but also programs related to the development and welfare of the province. For instance, it broadcasts programs for women development, for health, education, for children, agriculture and so on. Pakistani FM radios which promotes Pashto partially or fully:

- Arman Fm 98.1 in Kabul
- Radio Afghanistan in Kabul
- Radio Azadi FM 100.5 in Kabul
- Kabul Rock FM 108.0 in Kabul
- Spogmai FM 102.2 in Kabul
- FM 91.00 Radio Khyber from Khyber agency
- FM 92.2 Radio Pakhtunkhwa
- FM 92.6 Radio Aman Mardan
- FM 93.00 Radio Dilber, Charsadda
- FM 96.00 Swat
- FM 102.00 Bannu / North Waziristan
- FM 90.7Mhz Hamasha Bahar FM in Nangarhar Province - Afghanistan
- FM 99.9 NAN ( Today ) 99.9 in Nangarhar province - Afghanistan
- FM AMN FM ( Peace ) 96.8 in Nangarhar province - Afghanistan
- FM Muram ( Hope ) Pashto broadcasting
- FM Abasin Ningarhar
- FM Awoshton Paktia
- AM Talwasa Sharana City
- FM Paiwastoon Urzgan
- FM Wronga Kandahar
- FM Zanat Logar
- FM Bost In Helmand
- FM SAMOON in Helmand
- FM Sabawoon In Helmand
- FM Chenar in Khost
- FM NAN in Khost
- FM Mena in Ningarhar
- FM SANGA in Kandahar
- FM Da Hilo Karwan Khost
- FM Suli Paygham Khost
- FM Sharq Nangarhar
- FM Enikas Nangarhar
- FM Nargis Nangarhar
- FM Safa Nangarhar
- FM Nakhtar Kunar

Radio stations from international religious organizations are also broadcast into the region. These stations tend to focus on community issues with programs about education, children, health and reconciliation.

=== International radio stations ===
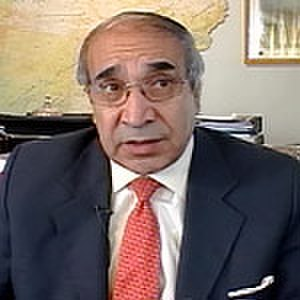
Ali Ahmad Jalali served with the Voice of America covering Afghanistan, South and Central Asia, and the Middle East, including assignments as Director of the Afghan Radio Network Project and chief of the Pashto services.

Pashto though mainly a language in Afghanistan and Pakistan; is spoken in many parts of the world due to the large diaspora of these two countries. There are also a large number of Pashtuns living overseas particularly in the Middle East. Nabi Misdaq founded the Pashto Section of BBC World Service in the 1980s and in the same period Ali Ahmad Jalali was involved with Voice of America's Pashto in the United States. Some Pashto-language programs are included in the following international stations:

- BBC World Service FM 89.0 in Pashto
- Radio Free Afghanistan (RFA) in Pashto
- Voice of America (VOA) in Pashto
- China Radio International
- Radio Moscow
- Deutsche Welle

The above radio stations broadcast different programs like Khabarnama (news), dramas, musical, women and agricultural related programs. Similarly, most of the programs comprise literary short-dramas, discussions and mushairas.

Association of Radio Journalists (ARJ) is first Radio Journalists forum of Khyber pakhtunkhwa nad FATA. Muhammad Zaman Adil first elected president of ARJ.

== Television and internet ==
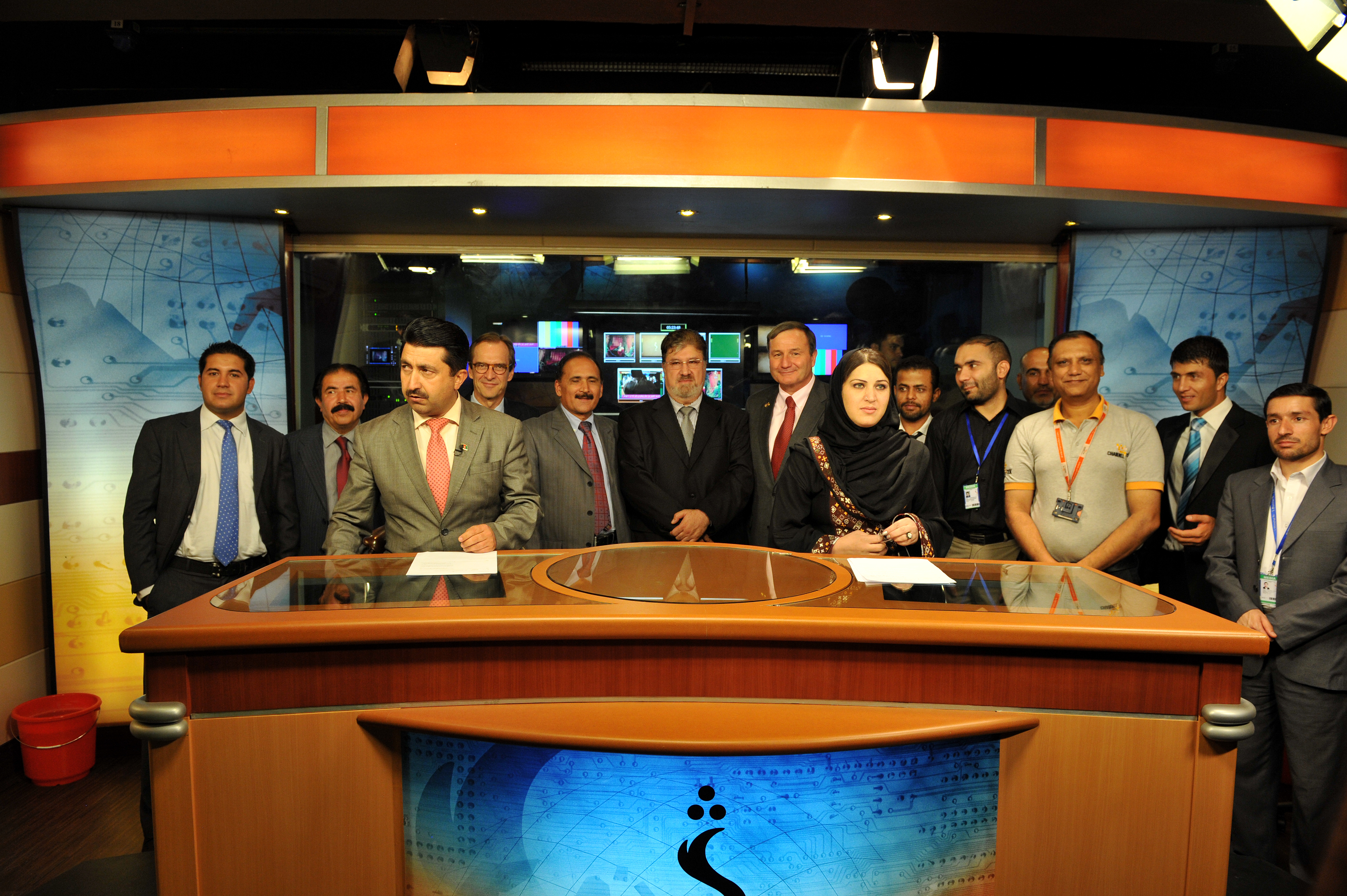
Shamshad TV studio in 2010. In the background are the station owner Fazle Karim Fazl, with former U.S. Ambassador Karl Eikenberry and Afghan Communications Minister Sangin Amirzai.

The first TV channels broadcasting Pashto programs were during the 1970s. Pakistan Television Peshawar (PTV Peshawar) was inaugurated in 1974, at 2-Fort Road in the city of Peshawar, Pakistan. All programs were transmitted in black and white until February 1982 when color was transmission began. Besides Pashto. PTV Quetta was inaugurated in November 1974. In the meantime, Afghanistan had its own TV stations in the 1970s and 1980s, in which programs in Pashto and Dari were being broadcast throughout the country. During the Taliban era from 1994 to 2001, TV was banned in Afghanistan. It restarted under the 2001–present NATO-backed Karzai administration, and a number of stations are available which broadcast in Pashto. Voice of America in the United States also has a Pashto section called Ashna TV, which mainly broadcasts current news. One of its usual anchor is Ibrahim Nasar, a Pashtun from the Balochistan-Kandahar region.

AVT Khyber started its transmission in 2004 from Asia set 3. Earlier the period of time for programmes was 12 hours, but on completion of one year it extended the time period to 24 hours. AVT Khyber is mainly Pashto channel . The channel shows all kind of program, from talk shows and dramas to videos and movies. Like PTV Peshawar, the programs of AVT Khyber also consist of entertainment, news and current affairs. The policy for its news is the same as that of other private channels in the country.

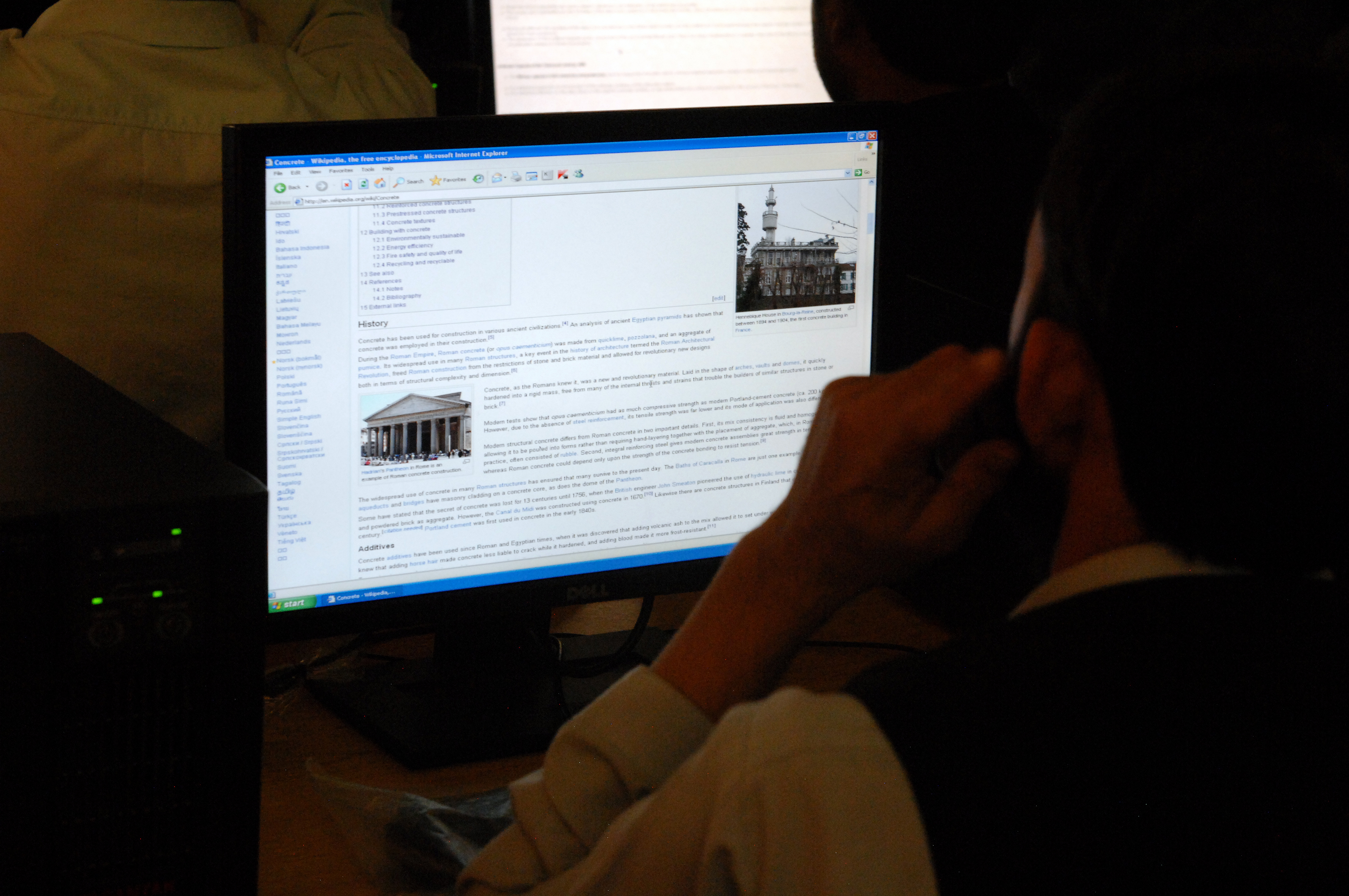
Internet user at Kandahar University in southern Afghanistan.

Shamshad TV is a satellite television station based in Afghanistan, which was launched in early 2006. The channel broadcasts 18 hours a day, providing educational, news, shows, dramas, and entertaining programs to the Afghanistan region as well as other countries via satellite. Its name is taken from a mountain named Shamshad, which is one of the highest mountains in Afghanistan. It transmits hourly news, current affairs programs, entertainment programs, politics programs, sports programs and criminal incidents programs. It has many live shows such as Dini Larkhowani (Religious Guidance) and Nizaam Ao Meezaan (Government and Balance). Lemar TV (meaning "Sun TV" in Pashto) is another TV station based in Afghanistan, which was also launched in 2006. The channel broadcasts news, shows, and entertainment programs to certain parts of the country.

In the 2000s, Pashto joined the internet world. There are many websites which provide news and other information in the Pashto language. All Afghanistan related government or private websites provide access in Pashto language. Wikipedia and other international organizations also have Pashto versions available.

In August 2014, Sabaoon TV channel launched in Mardan, Pakistan which the first pashto's HD Tv channel.

some other new Pashto channels includes Aruj TV, Pashto 1, Attanr Tv and many others.

== Film industry ==
Pashto films are widely shown in Pakistan and Afghanistan. The first Pashto film was Laila Majnoon, released in 1942. It was shown in Peshawar, Quetta, Calcutta (now India). The director of the film was Mir Hamza Shinwari, while its composer was Abdul Karim. The heroine of Laila Majnoon was Harry Jay and the hero was Rafiqe Ghaznawi. The second Pashto film was made in 1960 and its story was a translation of an Urdu film, Nai Kiran (new ray). The dialogues of the film were written by Mir Hamza Shinwari. It was displayed at Novelty cinema, Peshawar. Pashto's 3rd film was the 1963 Tiga, also made by Mir Hamza Shinwari. The hero of the film was Umer Daraz, while Ludeel was the cameraman of the film. Then in 1968 another film Yakka Yousaf Khan was released. The heroine of the film was Ghazali while the hero was Rab Nawaz. This film was inaugurated by Urdu film star, Rangila.

=== Pashto hits ===
1. Yousaf Khan Sher Bano was made in 1969 and released in 1970. It was written and directed by Aziz Tabassum.
2. Sandar Gharai (Singer) was released in 1970. Badar Munir was the hero and Yasmin Khan was the heroine of the movie, whereas Niamat Sarahadi was the villain.
3. Kala Khazan Kala Bahar (meaning some times autumn some times spring) was directed by Jamil Ahmad and produced by Syed Amir Sarhadi in 1970. The hero of the film was Aman.
4. Aalaqa Ghair (means land of no law) was made (produced) by Habibullah khan in 1971. Dialogues and poetry was made by Amir Hamza Shinwari.

Similarly Darrae Khyber, Adam Khan Durkhanai (produced by Shakil Ayub and directed by Aziz Tabassum), Musa Khan Gul Makai (hero was Asif Khan and heroine was Yasmin Khan), Bahadur Khan (hero was Humayun Qureshi), Ajab Khan Afridi, Zama Badan', Maghrur, Oarbal, Topak Zama Qanoon (produced by Aziz Tabassum), Dahqan (produced by Badar Munir), Baghi, Arman, Miranae Roar (step brother), Tarbooz, Iqrar, Angar, Zakhmoona, Navae au Nakriza (Bridal and Henna), Ujrati Qatil, Da Aoochea Khan, Prdang, Toofani Shappa, Bangri au Hathqardae, Ab-e-Hyat, Khulea Nave, Kufar au Islam, Da Karye Gorilla and many more are the Pashto hits from 1970–71 to 1985.

Role of film in the development of Khyber Pakhtunkhwa: From 1960 to 1980s Pashto film enjoyed its great times. Its standard was on no grounds less than that of Urdu films till mid-1970s and even 1980s. If there were waheed Murad, Nadim and Mohammad Ali in Lollywood (Urdu films), so Badar Munir, Asif Khan and many others were the chocolate heroes of

During these days cinema was the most effective way to communicate with the people as the standard of the movies were very good. Until the mid-1980s films were made on almost every subject and the people really loved to watch Pashto movies in cinema. So Pashto films played a great role in development of Pakhtoon khuwa as though cinema used to situate only in the urban areas of Khyber Pakhtunkhwa, but people from far flung areas came to cities such as Peshawar, Mardan, and Mingora to watch films. Now though the standard of the Pashto film has fallen very much, but the youths, especially the rural people still love to go to cinema.

Pashto films in the 1990s: until 1990 there were some great names in the Pashto film industry. For instance, Mir Hamza Shinwari who was a producer, director and a great name in the Pashto poetry. Murad Shinwari is the one whose name comes in the list of the producers and directors who really served the Pashto industry in its real sense. Amir Ghulam Sadiq is the only name in the Pashto film industry, who did poetry for Pashto films for almost more than 30 years. But after 1990 owing to the absence of institutionalization in the Pashto film industry, there were no such dedicated people, which in intern created environment conducive to vulgarity and obscenity and the standard of the Pashto films fell.

== See also ==
- List of Pashto-language singers
- List of television channels in Afghanistan
- List of television stations in Pakistan
- List of Afghan singers
- Pollywood
