= List of radio stations in Afghanistan =

Radio broadcasting has been the most popular form of mass media in Afghanistan since the 1920s, which is mostly in Dari and Pashto languages. According to the Ministry of Information and Culture, there are 228 AM, FM, and shortwave radio stations in Afghanistan. The following is an incomplete list of radio stations in Afghanistan:

== Arabic Radio ==
- Baba Radio FM 144.6
- Al-Ahlam Radio FM 178.5
- BBC World FM 199.2
- Radio Ahab Jerusalema FM 145.5
- Jameel Radio FM 148.5

== International localized ==
- Radio Srood in Dari, Pashto, Pamiri, Hazaragi, Uzbeki, Pashai and many more.
- Afghanistan International AM 999 / 7600
- All India Radio (AIR) in Pashto and Dari
- BBC World Service FM 89.0 in Pashto and Dari
- China Radio International in Pashto
- Deutsche Welle (DW) in Pashto and Dari
- IRIB World Service in Pashto and Dari
- Radio Azadi in Pashto and Dari
- Radio Free Afghanistan in Pashto and Dari
- Radio Ranginkaman in Persian and Dari
- Radio Saudi International in Pashto
- TRT World in Pashto and Dari
- Voice of America in Pashto and Dari
- Voice of Tajik in Dari

== National ==
- Radio Srood commercial and popular radio
- Ariana FM 93.5 FM, commercial
- Arman FM 98.1 FM, commercial
- Hurriyat Radio 88.5 FM, public
- OMID Radio, 103.7 FM, public
- Radio Afghanistan 105.2 FM, public
- Salam Watandar 98.9 FM, commercial
- Radio Asmayee 88.7 FM, commercial

== Regional ==
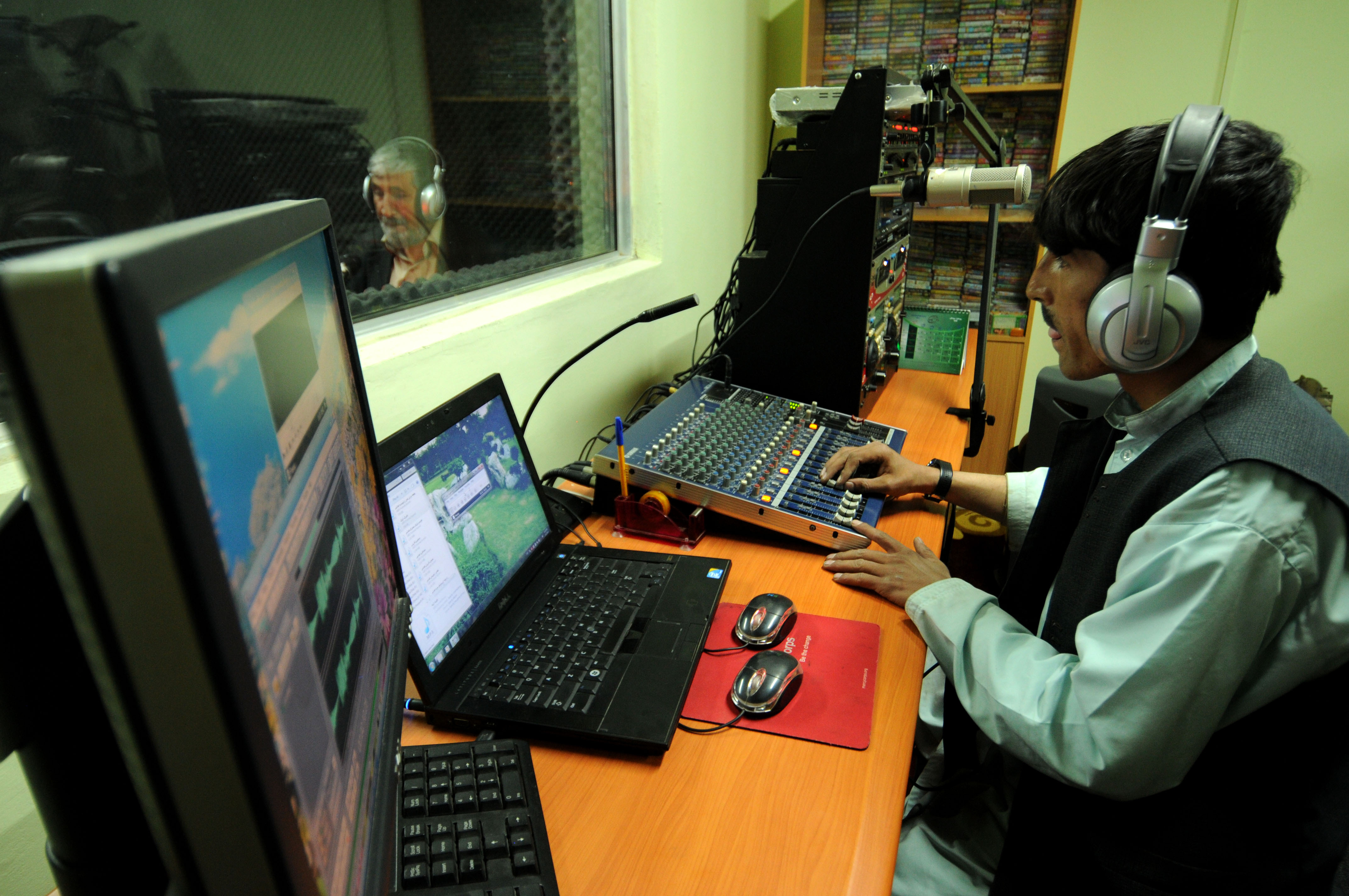
Inside a local radio station in Qalat, Afghanistan

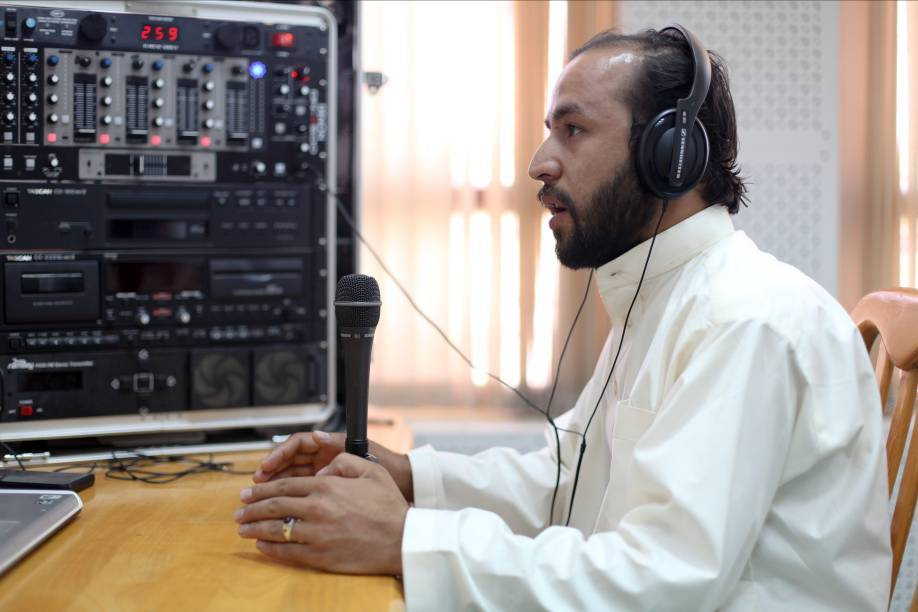
A local radio personality for the Voice of Maiden in Wardak province of Afghanistan.

- Radio Srood popular station in Afghanistan and abroad.
- Saba Radio
- Radio Nawa FM 103.1
- Yawali Ghag Radio 94.4 FM Wardak
- Afghan Ghag FM 106.1
- Radio Cheenar FM 89.8 Khost
- Paktia Ghag Radio station FM 94.2
- Milma Radio FM 88.2 in Paktika Province
- Radio Youth FM 97.5
- Kabul Rock FM 108.0 in Kabul
- Radio Aryana FM 93.5 in Kabul
- Spogmai FM FM 102.2 in Kabul
- Radio kILID FM 87.5 in Kabul
- Radio Hamisha Bahar fm 90.6 Nangarhar province
- Radio FM 89.4 in Kabul
- Radio Shaher FM 95.5 in Kabul
- Radio Nakhter FM 90.7 in Assadabad, Kunar Province
- Radio Zala FM 89.2 in Kunar Province
- Radio Zala FM 92.1 In Nangarhar Province Jalalabad
- Radio Turkmen FM 92.9 in Jowzjan province
- Radio Helmand Medium Wave 6KW and 2.5KW FM transmission equipment
- Radio Watandar Upgrade to 2.5KW in Kabul
- Radio Maiwand 92.7
- Radio Mowj 105.5
- Radio Alim
- Radio Mojdah Herat 91.3
- Radio Baraan Harat
- Radio Watandar Harat 87.5
- Radio Maherr Mazar e Sharif
- Radio Waranga in Kandahar
- Radio Samoon Helmand
- Radio Safa 89.7 Nangarhar
- Radio Muska Helmand
- Radio Sharq Upgrade 91.3
- Radio Nargis 92.4
- Radio Zala Kunar with Three FM Repeater system
- Radio Muram Jalalabad 97.8
- Radio Abasin Jalalabad 91.8
- Radio NAN Jalalabad 99.9
- Radio Nary Kunar 88.00
- Radio Nuristan in Kalagush 89.00
- Radio NAN Khost 89.2
- Radio Zanat Logar
- Radio Dunya Parwan 105.5
- Radio Paiwastoon Urzgan
- Radio Enikass FM 97.1 in Jalalabad
- Radio Bost FM Helmand
- Radio Hamesha Bahar 90.6
- Radio TOLO Khorshid Parwan
- Radio Awashtoon Paktia 88.8
- Radio Talwasa Am 945
- Radio Kahkashan
- Radio Amaan GHAG jalalabad 96.9
- Radio Hamasa Qondoz
- Radio Omid Farda Takhar 91.5
- Radio Eslah Mazer e Sharif 104.3
- Radio Eslah poli khumri 104.3
- Radio Nan FM paktia
- Radio Ansar Herat 97.11
- Radio Zama Kandahar 89.1
- Radio Taroon Ghaag Urozgaan 88.5
- Pakhtoonistan FM Nangarhar
- Radio Gorbat (GRTV) 107,7 FM
- Radio Tanin 89.7FM
- Radio Chiragh Kandahar 90.90

== See also ==
- Communications in Afghanistan
