= 87.5 FM =

FM radio frequency

87.5 FM is the first useable radio broadcast frequency on the FM radio band between 87.5 and 108.0 FM or VHF Band 2. The use of 87.5 FM as the main carrier frequency of a legally established and licensed radio station is rare in most countries as it transmits signals slightly off band down to roughly 87.3 and possibly as low as 87.2 FM.

In the United Kingdom, radio station broadcasts on 87.5 FM are likely pirate radio stations as there are no known radio broadcasting licenses that are allocated to 87.5 FM (within the United Kingdom). There are a few licenses for 87.6 FM, however, most transmit on 87.7 FM and upwards.

Many personal FM transmitters intended to be used inside of cars operate at 87.5 FM and allow the user to stream music from their device to older car radios or devices lacking Bluetooth connectivity.

Stations that broadcast on 87.5 FM include:

== Antarctica ==
- KOLD at South Pole Station.

== Argentina ==
- Cadena Tropical in Santa Fe de la Vera Cruz, Santa Fe
- FM Grand Bourg in Grand Bourg, Buenos Aires
- FM Soldados in Buenos Aires
- Radio El Palomar, in Banda del Río Salí, Tucumán

== Brazil ==
In Brazil, the frequency 87.5 FM is one of the frequencies reserved for community radio stations. These stations have power limited to up to 25 watts and coverage limited to a radius of up to 1 km (1000 yards).

== China ==
- CNR Business Radio in Xiamen
- CNR China Traffic Radio in Hangzhou, Nantong, and Wuxi
- Zhuhai Economic & Traffic Radio

== Greece ==
- Kriti FM in Athens
- Skyline FM in Korinthos
- Radio Amore at Iraklio

== Guatemala ==
- Así Fue Mi Vida

== Philippines ==
- DWFO in Metro Manila: Began test broadcast from November 1, 2017. The Philippine Broadcasting Service had long been desiring to use the frequency for an FM station in the area. Prior to PBS's acquisition, the Kapisanan ng mga Brodkaster ng Pilipinas asked the National Telecommunications Commission to reserve this frequency to local campuses due to multiple reports that others would use it for commercial purposes.
- XFM in Sagay, Negros Occidental
- MISOR Radyo in Tagoloan, Misamis Oriental
- DXQQ in Davao City

== Spain ==
- TKO FM 87.5 Costa Blanca

== Taiwan ==
- Transfers CNR Business Radio in Kinmen
