= Hurriyat Radio =

News agency in Afghanistan

Hurriyat Radio Pashto: حريت راډيو
- Type: Independent and autonomous news agency
- Founded: 2022
- Motto: The Real Voice of Afghans
- Headquarters: Kabul, Afghanistan
- Area: Afghanistan
- Launch date: 2024
- Official website: hurriyat.af
- Language: Dari, Pashto

Hurriyat Radio (Pashto: حريت راډيو) is a news agency and a FM radio station in Afghanistan, with its headquarters in Kabul. It was established in 2022 supposedly by the General Directorate of Intelligence to cover latest important news stories relating to Afghanistan. Its journalists visit all provinces of Afghanistan to cover such stories.

== See also ==
- List of radio stations in Afghanistan
- Mass media in Afghanistan
