= 108.0 FM =

FM radio frequency

This is a list of radio stations that broadcast on FM frequency 108.0 MHz:

== Afghanistan ==
- 108.0 Kabul Rock

== Egypt ==
- 108.0 MHz Youth and Sport (Greater Cairo)

== Greece ==
- Ihorama FM
- Radio Makedonia FM

== Indonesia ==
- Jalasveva Jayamahe (JJM): Jakarta

== Italy ==
- Radio Gioiosa Marina (Gioiosa Marina)
- Radio Studio Emme (Napoli)

== Spain ==
- 108.0 Vibe FM Alicante
