= Spogmai FM =

Radio station in Afghanistan

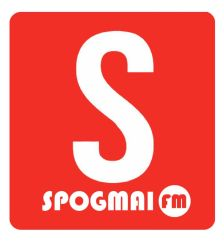

Kabul; Afghanistan
- Broadcast area: Kabul, Maidan Wardak, Logar, Parwan, Kandahar
- Frequency: 102.2 MHz

Programming
- Language: Pashto
- Affiliations: China Radio International

Ownership
- Owner: Axon Media Group
- Sister stations: Saar FM

History
- First air date: 26 September 2008; 16 years ago

Links
- Webcast: Live stream
- Website: www.spogmairadio.com

Spogmai FM (Pashto: سپوږمۍ اېف اېم) is a radio station from Axon Media Group based in Kabul, Afghanistan. Spogmai FM began broadcasting in the cities of Kabul and Kandahar on FM 102.2 in October 2008.

== History ==
Spogmai radio programs cover news, politics, economics, and entertainment. The organization is partnered with China Radio International Pashto (CRI Pashto) and China Radio International (CRI), a state-owned international radio broadcaster of the People's Republic of China, in Afghanistan. It airs CRI Pashto's programs in Afghanistan. Its subsidiary TV news channel, STR News or Spogmai Television Radio News, was launched in December 2020.

On October 18, 2022, Spogmai FM journalist Ezatullah Salimi was abducted by two armed men who held him in their car for three hours and questioned him. According to Salimi and security footage reviewed by the nonprofit media rights organization Committee to Protect Journalists, he was beaten during questioning on what the attackers viewed as anti-Taliban reporting before being released.

== See also ==
- List of radio stations in Afghanistan
- Pashto radio
