= One Village, A Thousand Voices =

One Village, A Thousand Voices (یو کلی زر غږونه/یک قریه هزار صدا), is a bilingual (Dari and Pashto) radio drama series that features young Afghans as they seek a voice in village-level justice-related decision-making. The series, which is produced in partnership with Equal Access International, airs on Radio Azadi. The series was launched in April 2013, and the episodes are followed once a week by a discussion program.
