= Selab =

Neighborhood in Tabriz, Iran

Selab (Azerbaycanca: Selab, Persian: سئلاب), is a district of Tabriz.

Selab district is located in North of Tabriz, south of Eynali mountain and consists of two neighbourhoods: Selab Bazarçası and Quşxana Selab. Selab was traditionally a labour class district since at least Qajar era. During Mohammad Reza Pahlavi's industrialization plans under the name of white revolution (ca. 1960s), Selab became a destination of the unskilled labour immigrants from the Iranian Azerbaijan's rural areas. It is one of the most dense and poorest districts of Tabriz.
