= Radio Azadi =

Afghan branch of Radio Free Europe / Radio Liberty's (RFE/RL) broadcast services

- Formation: January 2002
- Purpose: Broadcast Media
- Headquarters: Kabul, Afghanistan
- Official language: Pashto, Dari
- Owner: United States government
- Key people: Samiullah Mahdi
- Parent organization: Radio Free Europe/Radio Liberty
- Website: azadiradio.org

Radio Azadi (Pashto: د ازادي راډیو; Dari: رادیو آزادی; formerly Radio Free Afghanistan) is the Afghan branch of the U.S. government's Radio Free Europe / Radio Liberty's (RFE/RL) external broadcast services. It broadcasts 12 hours daily as part of a 24-hour stream of programming in conjunction with Voice of America (VOA). Radio Free Afghanistan first aired in Afghanistan from 1985 to 1993 and was re-launched in January 2002. Radio Azadi produces a variety of cultural, political, and informational programs that are transmitted to listeners via shortwave radio, satellite and AM and FM signals provided by the International Broadcasting Bureau. According to Radio Azadi, their mission is "to promote and sustain democratic values and institutions in Afghanistan by disseminating news, factual information and ideas".

On March 15, 2025, the United States Agency for Global Media terminated grants to Radio Free Europe/Radio Liberty and its subsidiaries following a directive from the Trump Administration. All staff were put on administrative leave and programming has largely or entirely been suspended.

== Present ==
The U.S. Congress appropriated funding for broadcasting to Afghanistan in December 2001 following the U.S.-led ouster of the Taliban regime. Radio Free Afghanistan has since built a substantial audience in Afghanistan, with surveys showing it as the most popular radio station in the country. Radio Azadi produces a variety of programming—from special programs for youth and women to political satires and music and literary programs.

Recently Radio Azadi conducted a joint seminar with Kabul University's School of Journalism on “Media and Democracy. Samiullah Mahdi is the bureau chief of Radio Azadi in Afghanistan since 2019."

== Media environment in Afghanistan ==
Radio Free Europe / Radio Liberty journalists in Afghanistan are under constant threat of intimidation from warlords, the Taliban, and other extremists. Attempts have also been made to tighten media control in the name of "respect for Islamic values." Concurrently, the number of private television and radio stations has grown in Afghanistan, leading to increased competition among media operating in the country.

== History ==
Radio Free Europe / Radio Liberty first launched this service on October 1, 1985, during the Soviet invasion of Afghanistan (1979–1989). Its purpose was "to bring objective and uncensored news and information to the population and resistance forces of Soviet-occupied Afghanistan." The service initially consisted of twice-weekly thirty-minute broadcasts in Dari and later expanded to hour-long broadcasts five days a week in Pashto and Dari. Radio Free Afghanistan was the first expansion of RFE/RL's broadcast area in thirty years. Broadcasts stopped in 1993 for budgetary purposes and began again in 2001 following the U.S. Invasion of Afghanistan. Congress authorized the appropriation of eight million dollars in operating costs for FY 2002 and nine million dollars in capital costs that would fund the construction of a new shortwave transmitter in Kuwait.

After the Taliban takeover of Afghanistan in 2021, the radio had voiced highly critical views of the Taliban. It highlighted issues regarding women's rights and had spoken in opposition of religious fundamentalism.

== Highlights ==
In May 2002, U.S. First Lady Laura Bush addressed the people of Afghanistan in a speech delivered from the Prague headquarters of RFE/RL.

The Library of Congress in Washington, D.C. recently launched a new exhibit named "Voices From Afghanistan" showcasing some of the thousands of handwritten scrolls and letters sent by listeners.

Recent awards: David Burke Distinguished Journalism Award for “enormous courage in continuing to deliver the news to their fellow citizens”; two National Union of Journalists of Afghanistan awards for aiding the reconstruction of Afghan society through balanced and objective reporting and Afghanistan Chamber of Commerce and Industries award for excellent in reporting.

In the run-up to Afghanistan's presidential elections in 2009, Radio Azadi hosted a historic presidential debate featuring President Hamid Karzai and two of his leading contenders. It was Afghanistan's first-ever debate to feature an incumbent president and was televised on Afghan national TV.

In 2009, Congress appropriated six million dollars of additional funding to allow Radio Azadi to begin broadcasting to the Pashto-speaking border regions on the Afghanistan–Pakistan border.

In 2009, U.S. Secretary of State Hillary Clinton responded to questions submitted by listeners in Afghanistan during an interview in Radio Azadi's studios in Prague.

== See also ==
- Press TV
- IRIB World Service
- Al Jazeera
- CCTV International Arabic
- Rusiya Al-Yaum (روسيا اليوم)
- Al Mayadeen (الميادين)
- France 24 (Monte Carlo Doualiya)
- One Village, A Thousand Voices
