= Kabul Rock =

Rock station in Kabul

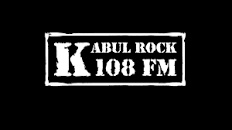

Kabul Rock, 108.0 FM was a rock station in Kabul, Afghanistan, playing music ranging from 1950s' rockabilly to modern rock and metal. It started broadcasting during the Nowruz festival in 2010. It quickly attracted a following with both Afghans and foreigners in the community tuning into the station.

Its base stations have been attacked and threatened by insurgents, and thus are very well hidden and not known to many. It can be heard within greater Kabul and most of the way to Bagram, where the signal fades.
