= Women in Afghanistan =

Global Gender Gap Index
- Value: 0.435 (2022)
- Rank: 146 out of 146

Women's rights in Afghanistan are severely restricted by the Taliban. In 2023, the United Nations termed Afghanistan as the world's most repressive country for women. Since the US troops withdrawal from Afghanistan in 2021, the Taliban gradually imposed many restrictions on women's freedom of movement, education, and employment. Women are banned from studying in secondary schools and universities, making Afghanistan the only country to prohibit women from studying beyond the age of twelve. Women are not allowed in parks, gyms, or beauty salons. They are forbidden from going outside for a walk or exercise, from speaking or showing any part of their face or body outside the home, or even from singing or reading from within their own homes if they could be heard by strangers outside. In extreme cases, women have reportedly been subjected to rape and torture in Taliban prisons.

Women face harsh punishments such as flogging and stoning to death for adultery. There has been an increase in female suicides and sexual crimes targeted at women following the takeover of the Taliban in 2021. Many women have left the country to places such as Iran to pursue education and employment. The discrimination against women and systematic segregation in Afghanistan under the Taliban has been termed as "gender apartheid" by organizations such as the UN and Amnesty International.

In 2026, human rights lawyer Belquis Ahmadi wrote:

Afghanistan has become the world's most devastating example of the systematic persecution of women and girls. No other country has imposed such extensive restrictions on half of its population solely on the basis of gender.

== Overview ==
Afghanistan is on the crossroads of South Asia and Central Asia and has a population of roughly 50.9 million. Of these, 25.8 million are male and 25.1 million are female. About 22% of the Afghan people are urbanite and the remaining 78% live in rural areas. As part of local culture, most women are married soon after completing high school. Many live as housewives for the remainder of their lives.

List of the current restrictions on women in Afghanistan since Taliban takeover in August 2021:
Restrictions on women in Afghanistan under Taliban	Declaration date
Co-education is banned.; Secondary schools are open only to boys, with girls banned from attending.; Female university students are ordered to attend gender-segregated classes and wear specific abayas.; The Ministry of Women's Affairs is abolished.; Ministry for the Propagation of Virtue and the Prevention of Vice is restored. The ministry enforces decrees related to Afghan women issued by the Taliban Supreme Leader. It oversees implementation of strict laws that largely remove women from public life and restrict their personal freedoms. The ministry took over the physical building that previously housed the government's Women's Affairs Ministry, effectively erasing formal institutional representation for women's rights.	September 2021
Women are barred from appearing in television dramas, soap operas, and entertainment shows.	November 2021
Women are banned from traveling more than 72 kilometers (45 miles) unless accompanied by a close male relative (mahram).; Drivers are instructed not to pick up un-veiled female passengers.	26 December 2021
Girls' secondary schools (ages over 12) are ordered to shut down just hours after reopening nationwide.	March 23, 2022
Strict gender segregation is enforced in public parks and amusement spaces.	March, 2022
Taliban Supreme Leader Mullah Hibatullah Akhundzada issued a decree requiring women to cover themselves from head to toe, including their faces, whenever they leave their homes, typically by wearing a burqa or thick veil.; In the same decree, women are "strongly" told to only leave their homes when "necessary".	May 7, 2022
Female television presenters are ordered to cover their faces while on air.	May 19, 2022
Women are completely prohibited from entering public parks, gardens, gyms, and public baths (hammams).	November 10, 2022
The Taliban Ministry of Higher Education suspends women from attending universities. Women are completely banned from attending universities or pursuing higher education.	December 20, 2022
National and international NGOs are ordered by the Afghan Taliban to suspend all female employees, severely hampering humanitarian aid delivery.	December 24, 2022
The Taliban ban Afghan women from working for the United Nations and other international organizations.	April 4, 2023
All beauty salons and hair parlors across the country are ordered to shut down, destroying a major source of female income and community gathering.	July 24, 2023
The Taliban formalizes a 114-page "Law of Propagation of Virtue and Prevention of Vice". This decree dictates that a woman's voice is intimate and must not be heard in public, meaning women are legally barred from singing, reciting, or speaking aloud outside the home.; The same decree bans women from looking directly at men who are not blood relatives.	August, 2024
A directive bans women from attending medical institutes, cutting off the last remaining loophole for women to access higher vocational education.	December, 2024
Regulations are introduced requiring residential homes to block or paint over any windows looking out onto areas where women may be present (like courtyards or kitchens) to prevent them from being seen from the street.	2025
Taliban forces begin actively blocking Afghan women—including UN staff, contractors, and visitors—from entering UN facilities throughout Afghanistan.	7 September 2025
The Taliban enacts Decree No. 12 (Criminal Procedure Code), which abolishes legal equality between men and women, grants husbands authority over their wives, restricts women's access to justice, and criminalizes domestic violence only when it results in severe and visible physical injuries. Women who repeatedly visit relatives without their husband's consent and disobey a judicial order to return home face three months' imprisonment.; Women civil servants who had been paid a baseline stipend of 5,000 Afghani per month to stay home since 2021 have their employment formally terminated and salaries halted completely.	January 2026
The Taliban enacts Decree No. 18 (Code on Judicial Separation of Spouses), which legitimizes child marriage and severely restricts the ability of women and girls to report domestic abuse and obtain separation from abusive husbands. Under the decree, a girl who reaches puberty without expressing opposition to her marriage may be deemed to have consented to it.	April 2026

To enforce the ministry's code of conduct, the Taliban's morality police patrol the streets to monitor women's clothing, behavior, and movement. Women found violating these rules face detention, public beatings, or imprisonment. The morality police also operate hundreds of checkpoints along highways throughout Afghanistan to enforce the decree. Although foreign female travelers are exempt from the decree, they face intense scrutiny and harassment at checkpoints, where Taliban guards may demand a male chaperone or question their movements.

== History ==
=== Emirate of Afghanistan ===
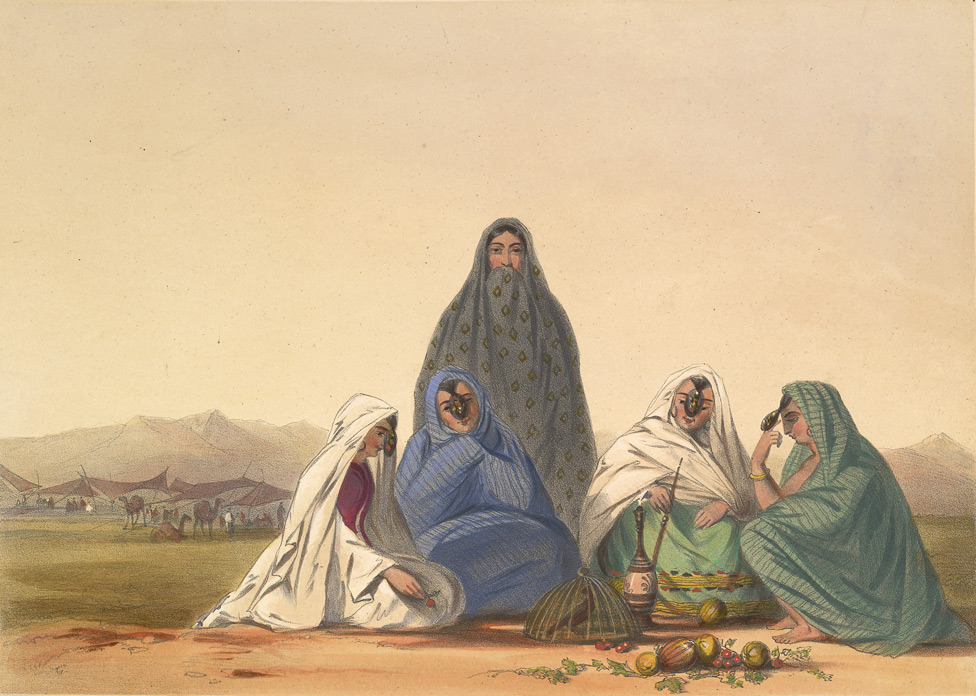
An 1848 lithography showing a group of nomadic women somewhere along the Kabul–Kandahar Highway

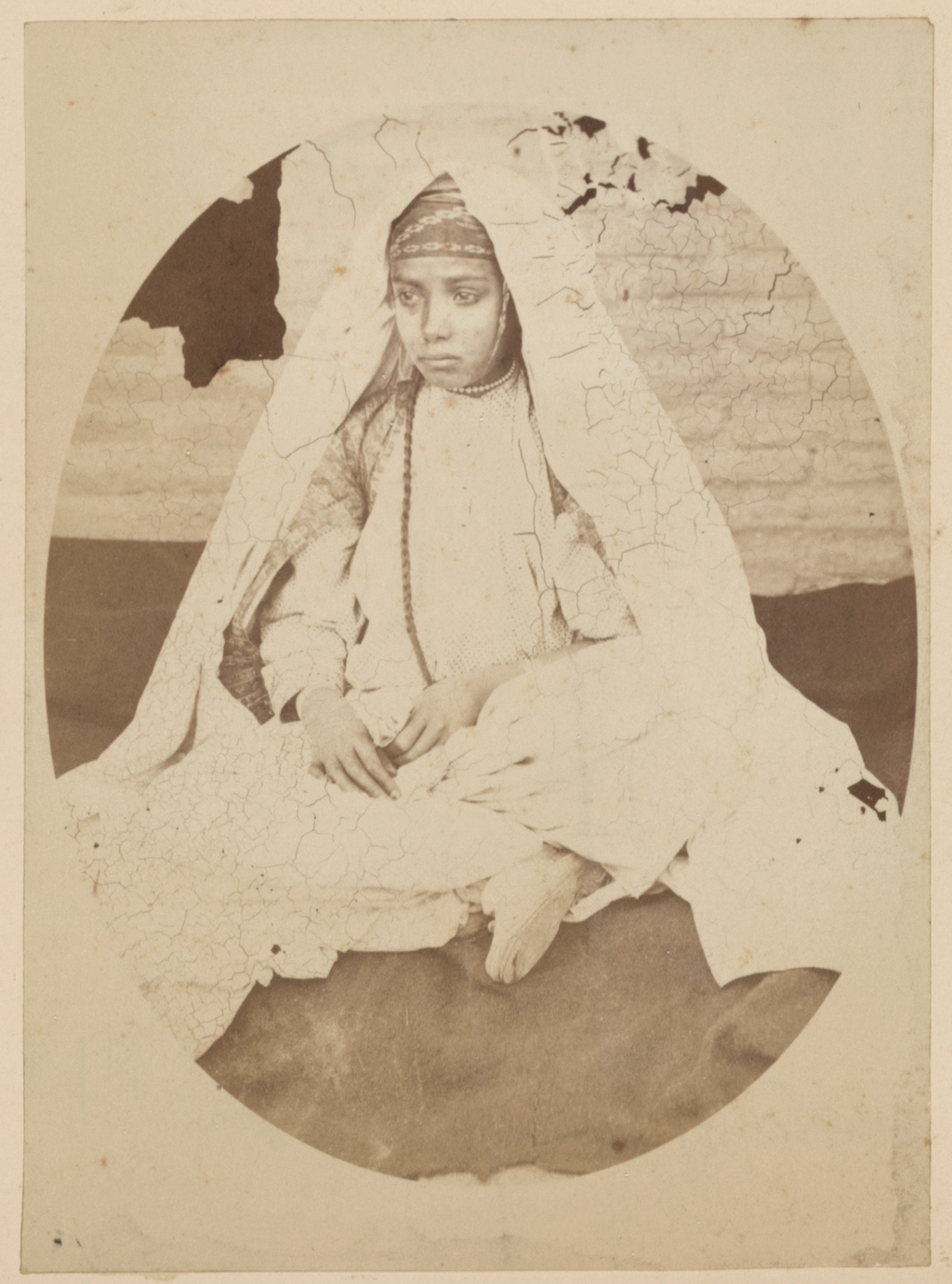
An Afghan girl photographed in 1880

During the Durrani Empire (1747–1823) and the early Barakzai dynasty Afghan women customarily lived subjected in a state of purdah and gender segregation imposed by patriarchal customs. While this was the case in all Afghanistan, the customs differed somewhat between regions and ethnic groups. Nomadic women, for example, did not have to hide their faces and even showed some of their hair.

Women did not play any public role in society, but some women, such as Nazo Tokhi and Ayesha Durrani, became noted as poets and writers, which were art forms possible for women to perform while living in the seclusion of the harem. The rulers of Afghanistan customarily had a harem of four official wives as well as a large number of unofficial wives for the sake of tribal marriage diplomacy, in addition to enslaved harem women known as kaniz ("slave girl") and surati or surriyat ("mistress"), guarded by the ghulam bacha (eunuchs). Some women had influence over the affairs of state from inside the royal harem, notably Zarghona Anaa, Mirmon Ayesha and Babo Jan.

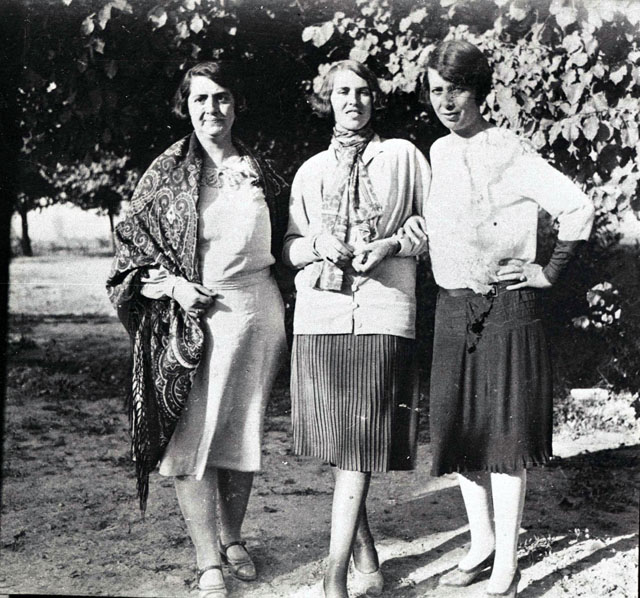
Afghan women in 1927, during the reform period of Amanullah Khan and Soraya Tarzi

Some Afghan rulers have attempted to increase women's freedom. For the most part, these attempts were unsuccessful. However, there were a few leaders who were able to make some significant, if temporary, changes.

==== Abdur Rahman Khan (1880 – 1901) ====
Some limited reforms were made by Abdur Rahman Khan (r. 1880–1901), who banned some forms of oppression originating from tribal customs rather than Islam, among them the custom of forcing widows to marry their brothers-in-law, and enforced some rights which Islam did approve of but local tribal customs did not, such as the right of widows to inherit.

His wife, Bono Jan was the first Afghan queen to appear publicly without a veil in Western attire. She rode horses as well as trained her maidservants in military exercises. With a keen interest in politics, she participated in a number of delicate diplomatic missions to mediate between opposing factions.

=== Kingdom of Afghanistan ===
==== Amanullah Khan (1919–1929) ====
The first person to have made significant reform was King Amanullah, who ruled from 1919 to 1929 and made some of the more noteworthy changes in an attempt to unify as well as modernize the country. He promoted freedom for women in the public sphere in order to lessen the control that patriarchal families exerted over women. King Amanullah stressed the importance of female education. Along with encouraging families to send their daughters to school, he promoted the unveiling of women and persuaded them to adopt a more western style of dress. In 1921, he created a law that abolished forced marriage, child marriage, and bride price, and put restrictions on polygamy, a common practice among households in the Afghanistan region.

Modern social reform for Afghan women began when Queen Soraya, wife of King Amanullah, made rapid reforms to improve women's lives and their position in the family, marriage, education and professional life. She founded the first women's magazine (Irshad-e Naswan, 1922), the first women's organization (Anjuman-i Himayat-i-Niswan), the first school for girls (Masturat School in 1920), the first theatre for women in Paghman and the first hospital for women (the Masturat Hospital in 1924). Queen Soraya set an example for the abolition of gender segregation by appearing with her husband, famously removing her veil in public, and her example was followed by others. The king declared that the veil was optional, permitted Western clothes in Kabul and reserved certain streets for men and women wearing modern clothes. In 1928, Amanullah sent fifteen female graduates of the Masturat middle school, daughters of the royal family and government officials, to study in Turkey. Soraya Tarzi was the only woman to appear on the list of rulers in Afghanistan, and was credited with having been one of the first and most powerful Afghan and Muslim female activists.

However, Queen Soraya, along with her husband's, advocacy of social reforms for women led to a protest and contributed to the ultimate demise of her and her husband's reign in 1929. King Amanullah Khan's deposition caused a severe backlash, and his successor reinstated the veil and repelled the reforms in women's rights, reinforcing purdah, a religious and social practice that consists of social segregation of the sexes and the requirement that women cover their bodies, as well as traditionally the faces. The Women's Association as well as the women's magazine was banned, the girls 'schools were closed, the female students who had been allowed to study in Turkey was recalled to Afghanistan and forced to put on the veil and enter purdah again, and polygamy for men was reintroduced.

According to some sources, women's suffrage was one of the radical reforms introduced by king Amanullah Khan in 1919, and belonged to the radical reforms of Amanullah that was retracted when king Amanullah was deposed in 1929. However, there were no parliamentary system in Afghanistan in 1919, and according to other sources, women did not receive the right to vote until late in the twentieth century; what is clear is that women's suffrage was not practiced until it was introduced in 1964, after the introduction of a parliamentary system in Afghanistan.

==== Mohammed Zahir Shah (1933–1973) ====
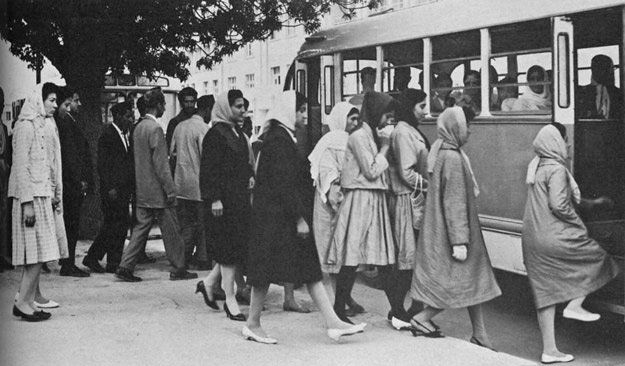
Afghan women in Kabul entering a bus during the 1950s

Successors Mohammed Nadir Shah and Mohammed Zahir Shah acted more cautiously, but nevertheless worked for the moderate and steady improvement of women's rights. Women were allowed to take classes at the Masturat Women's Hospital in Kabul in 1931, and some girls' schools were reopened; the first high school for girls was officially called a 'Nursing School' to prevent any opposition to it. While women were again forced to be veiled in public, unveiling had become accepted in private among the Afghan upper class, and it was noted that upper-class women were met at the Kabul International Airport by servants running up to the stairs of the airplane to deliver a chadar (veil) upon their arrival to Kabul from abroad, since they had not used it during their stay abroad.

After the Second World War, modernization reforms were seen as necessary by the government, resulting in the resurrection of a state women's movement. In 1946 the government-supported Women's Welfare Association (WWA) was founded with Queen Humaira Begum as patron, giving school classes for girls and vocational classes to women, and from 1950/1951 onward, women students were accepted at the Kabul University.

Following the election of Mohammed Daoud Khan as prime minister in 1953, social reforms giving women a more public presence were encouraged. One of his aims was to break free from the ultra-conservative, Islamist tradition of treating women as second-class citizens. During his time, he made significant advances towards modernization.

During his tenure as prime minister from 1953 to 1963, Daoud Khan implemented several progressive policies and laws to support women's rights in Afghanistan. He actively encouraged women to take part in public offices and introduced female staff members in various institutions such as Aryana Afghan Airline, the Tele-Communication department, and other organizations. Daoud also promoted the voluntary unveiling of women, emphasizing their freedom to choose whether or not to wear veils.

In addition to these efforts, Daoud aimed to extend women's emancipation beyond the capital city of Kabul. For instance, during his visit to Kandahar, he urged the wives of civil service personnel and other women to abandon the veil. There were instances of opposition to these modernization initiatives in isolated areas, resulting in violent acts against women who did not wear veils. However, the government remained steadfast in its commitment and punished the perpetrators by imprisoning them.

The prime minister prepared women's emancipation carefully and gradually. He began in 1957 by introducing women workers at the Radio Kabul; by appointing women delegates to the Asian Women's Conference in Ceylon; by employing forty girls to the government pottery factory, women as receptionists and telephone operators in the state Tele-Communications agency, and air hostesses at the Aryana Airlines in 1958.

When this was met with no riots, the government decided it was time for the very controversial step of unveiling. In 1959, women employed by the state, such as radio announcers, were asked to come to their work places without the veil, instead wearing a loose coat, scarf and cloves; after that, the foreign wives, and daughters of foreign born wives, were asked to venture out on the streets in the same way, and in this way, women without the veil were started to be seen in the streets of Kabul. In August 1959, on the second day of the festival of Jeshyn, Queen Humaira Begum and Princess Bilqis appeared in the royal box at the military parade unveiled, alongside the prime minister's wife, Zamina Begum. A group of Islamic clerics sent a letter of protest to the prime minister to protest and demand that the words of sharia be respected. The prime minister answered by inviting them to the capital and present proof to him that the holy scripture indeed demanded the chadri. When the clerics could not find such a passage, the prime minister declared that the female members of the Royal Family would no longer wear veils because the Islamic law did not demand it. While the chadri was never banned, the example of the Queen and the prime minister's wife was followed by the wives and daughters of government officials as well as by other urban women of the upper class and middle class, with Kubra Noorzai and Masuma Esmati-Wardak known as the first commoner pioneers.

The 1964 Constitution of Afghanistan granted women equal rights, including the right to education, freedom to work, universal suffrage and the right to run for office. During the reign of Zahir Shah, there were two women in the cabinet and four women in the parliament - two senators and in the house of Representatives - as well as several local women politicians: Agha Narg of village of Tagaw Barg in Panjaw in the 1950s; Mah-e-Alam, an Ismaili woman who represented the Dand village of Zibak District in Badakhsan Province in the early 1970s, and Arbab Khadija, the daughter of Murad Ali Karbalaye, who served as arbab of Anta and Shatu villages of Bamiyan in the late 1970s.

In the cities, women were able to appear unveiled, serve in public office and hold jobs as scientists, teachers, doctors, and civil servants, and they had a considerable amount of freedom with significant educational opportunities. Afghanistan had its first female cabinet ministers in the 1960s and Jameela Farooq Rooshna became the first female judge in Afghanistan (1969). Women also started appearing in media and entertainment. Rukhshana is popularly known as one of the first female Afghan pop singers, becoming well known in the 1960s, and Safia Tarzi as the first Afghan fashion designer.

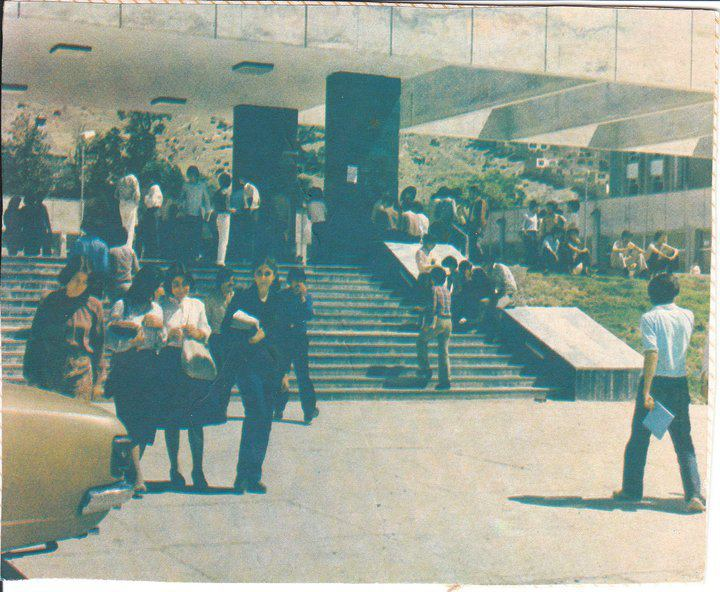
Kabul Faculty of Medicine 1970s

However, despite the effort of the Women's Welfare Association (WWA), the majority of women continued to be excluded from these opportunities, as these reforms had little effect outside of the cities and mainly concerned urban elite women. The countryside was a deeply patriarchal, tribal society, and the lives of rural women were not affected by the change taking place in the cities.

=== Republic of Afghanistan (1973–1978) ===
See also: Republic of Afghanistan (1973–1978)

Under the republic of Mohammad Daoud Khan in 1974–1978, women's rights and equality were upheld, as Article 27 of the 1976 Constitution of the Republic of Afghanistan (1973–1978) stated:

All the people of Afghanistan, both women and men, without discrimination and privilege, have equal rights and obligations before the law.

Mohammad Daoud Khan had initiated the work of the liberation of women long before the foundation of the republic in 1973, when he was prime minister of the king. The 1940s and 1950s saw women becoming nurses, doctors and teachers and civil servants. The first woman Minister was in the health department, elected to Parliament along with three other women, employed in airlines, private corporations, and this was the era that universities graduated female doctors from Universities of Afghanistan. In fact, in 1964 with the third Constitution, it was allowed for women to enter elected politics and by giving them the right to vote. Women's issues were once again given some consideration. Prime Minister Mohammad Daoud did not want to repeat the haste and mistakes of his predecessor Amanullah and declared veiling a "voluntary option". By now women were expected once again to abandon the veil, marriage expenses were curtailed, and women were encouraged to contribute to the economy. This continued until 1973 when Daoud Khan seized power in a coup. The coup was bloodless and gender issues in this time took another feature. With the purge of national and progressive elements from state positions Mohammad Daoud, desperately struggled to hide the real nature of his wishes and anti-democratic and anti-national objectives behind some progressive sentences. Through this period, women got more freedom than at any other time; right to education and to work, the possibility of joining political parties officially, and becoming representatives of the people in parliament.

Afghanistan transitioned into a republic in July 1973 following a coup led by former prime minister Mohammad Daoud Khan, who ousted King Zahir Shah. Daoud, a liberal nationalist, assumed the role of president and immediately expressed his intention to dismantle unjust patriarchal and feudal relationships between husbands and wives. He emphasized women's right to self-determination and pledged equality between men and women before the law, as well as universal and free primary education for all children, regardless of their gender.

In 1977, President Daoud introduced a civil code that included a comprehensive family law. The code specified a minimum age of 16 for girls and 18 for boys for marriage, granting both men and women the right to choose their spouses. It also permitted couples to marry even if their families opposed the union. Although the code granted men the exclusive right to divorce, it allowed women to seek divorce under specific conditions. A woman could file for divorce if her husband had an incurable disease, refused or was unable to provide financial support, was imprisoned for an extended period, secretly married another woman, or treated her with cruelty. Regarding child custody, the code stipulated that a divorced mother could retain custody of a boy until the age of 7 and a girl until the age of 9. The court could extend this period by two years if it was in the best interest of the child. Furthermore, President Daoud established a Family Court and appointed women judges in Kabul, Herat, Kandahar, and Kunduz.

President Daoud also made efforts to develop the female human resource pool by encouraging women to enroll in higher education institutions and pursue careers in the public and private sectors. Women were not only elected to both houses of the parliament but also recruited in the judiciary, academia, police, and armed forces. These steps contributed to a gradual change in society's perception of women's presence in the public sphere.

In 1975, to commemorate "Women's Year," President Daoud established the Women's Coordinating Committee (WCC) called Kumita-e- Ensijam-e-Zanan. The WCC aimed to elevate the status of Afghan women and facilitate their participation in public life. It collaborated with various women's organizations to improve the situation of Afghan women. The objectives of the WCC included collecting data on the issues faced by women in different sectors, identifying the causes of illiteracy and implementing appropriate literacy programs, raising awareness about women's social rights and roles as citizens and mothers, promoting the principle of equal rights for men and women, campaigning against polygamy, amending laws to include women's civil rights, publishing materials on Afghan women's struggle for equal rights and the works of women writers, and providing legal aid to women in need.

In 1977, the Revolutionary Association of the Women of Afghanistan (RAWA) was founded by Meena Keshwar Kamal. RAWA still operates in the Afghanistan-Pakistan region.

=== Communist era (1978–1992) ===
A teacher at a college in Kabul in 1987

The Democratic Republic of Afghanistan (1978–1987) and the Republic of Afghanistan (1987–1992), which followed the Saur revolution that toppled the government of Mohammed Daoud Khan, was a period of unprecedented equality for women in Afghanistan. The Communist ideology officially advocated gender equality and women's rights, and the communist government sought to implement it - though without success - on all classes throughout both urban and rural Afghanistan.

In 1978, the government, led by Nur Muhammad Taraki, gave equal rights to women. This gave them the theoretical ability to choose their husbands and careers. The women's emancipation policy of the government were supported by the Democratic Women's Organisation of Afghanistan (DOAW) and later by the Afghan Women's Council (AWC), who sought to implement it. Until 1989, the AWC was led by Masuma Esmati-Wardak and run by a staff of eight women. The AWC had around 150,000 members and offices in nearly all the provinces. The AWC provided social services to women in Afghanistan, in the fight against illiteracy and provided vocational training in the secretarial, hairdressing and manufacturing fields.

During the Communist era, women's rights were supported by both the Afghan government as well as by the Soviets who supported them. In contrast to what had been the case during the monarchy, when women's rights had been restricted to urban elite women, the Communists attempted to extend women's rights to all classes of society, also to rural women and girls. However, social norms and certain religious beliefs limited women's employment in rural Afghanistan, with significant disparities in working conditions between urban and village areas despite improvements in cities.

The communist government's ideological enforcement of female emancipation in the rural areas took the form of enforced literacy campaigns for women and compulsory schooling for girls, which was heavily resisted in particularly the Pashtun tribal areas. The Communists abolished patriarchal customs still prevalent in rural areas, such as the bride price, and raised the age of consent to marriage for girls to sixteen. In rural Afghanistan, gender seclusion and sex segregation was a strong part of local culture. To attend school girls would have to leave home, and school was therefore seen as deeply dishonorable. The policy of compulsory schooling for girls as well as boys was met with a strong backlash from the conservative rural population, and contributed to the resistance against the Soviets and the Communist regime by the Mujahideen, the Islamic guerillas.

The Communist government founded a center called Parwarishga-e-Watan, the National Nursery, to provide for orphans or illegitimate children, in which they were politically indoctrinated; they also founded cultural centers for the youth, in which young male and female party members were able to attend cultural activities and programs together.

The fact that young adolescent boys and girls were able to socialize together and thus break sex segregation was provocative to the extreme for the social conservatives, who reviled these institutions as enterprises that promoted degeneracy, with one critic describing them:

"Moral corruption and degradation was at its height after the so called Saur Revolution. An important meeting place of the young Parchamis–boys and girls– was the outhouses of the Bagh-e-Bala, Kabul. The Parchamis used to take pride in such corrupt practices and boasted to be belonging to an advanced society."

The conservative rural population came to regard the urban population as degenerate, partially because of the female emancipation, in which urban women mixed with men and participated in public life unveiled, and education for women, and by extension women's rights in general, came to be associated with Communism and atheism.

Female emancipation was a part of the regime's policy, but according to Anthony Hyman it was introduced mainly to benefit the party rather for any humanist principle. With a few exceptions, such as Anahita Ratebzad, Masuma Esmati-Wardak and Salcha Faruq Etemadi, most women were active at the low and the middle level of party hierarchy rather than the top. During the Communist regime, thousands of urban women were recruited to the cadres and militias of the PDPA party and the Democratic Women's Organisation of Afghanistan, and trained in military combat against the Mujahideen, the Islamic guerillas, and there was a concern among urban women that the reactionary fundamentalists would topple the Communist regime and the women's rights it protected.

The AWC came to symbolize women's rights in the eyes of many, who feared the sacrificing of the AWC in the national reconciliation talks which started in 1987. It is claimed that in 1991 around seven thousand women were in the institution of higher education and around 230,000 girls studying in schools around Afghanistan. There were around 190 female professors and 22,000 female teachers.

During Communist rule throughout the 80s, women had pristine rights especially in cities, until the end of the Soviet-Afghan War. The withdrawal of troops resulted in a decline in modernised campaigns, which hinted an unforeseen future for women because of the civil war as Mohammad Najibullah was assassinated by the Taliban in September 1996 outside the Arg, Kabul. He was the last leader of Afghanistan that supported western campaigns and maintained freedom across the country.

=== Mujahideen era (1992–1996) ===
In 1992, the government under Mohammad Najibullah transitioned to the Islamic State of Afghanistan. War in Afghanistan continued into a new phase when Gulbuddin Hekmatyar started a bombardment campaign against the Islamic State in Kabul. During the violent four-year civil war, a number of women were kidnapped, and some of them were raped.

The Mujahideen had viewed the Communist regime as godless and anti Islamic partially because of the women's emancipation supported by the Communist policy, and when in power, their goal was to abolish the freedom women had enjoyed during the Communist regime in order to Islamicize society. The restrictions imposed when the Islamic State was established were "the ban of alcohol and the enforcement of a sometimes-purely-symbolic veil for women". On 27 August 1993, the Government Office of Research and Decrees of the Supreme Court issued an order to government agencies and state functionaries to dismiss all women in their employ, and further decreed:

"Women need not leave their homes at all, unless absolutely necessary, in which case, they are to cover themselves completely; are not to wear attractive clothing and decorative accessories; do not wear perfume; their jewelry must not make any noise; they are not to walk gracefully or with pride and in the middle of the sidewalk; are not to talk to strangers; are not to speak loudly or laugh in public; and they must always ask their husbands' permission to leave home."

In reality however this decree remained on paper only, since the government did not have enough control of the country to implement their desired policy. Women, thus, remained in the workplace despite the decree and the liberal provisions of the 1964 constitution were largely upheld. During the unstable political situation in which different Islamic parties fought one another for domination, women in Kabul were abducted from their homes, jobs and offices and subjected to various forms of abuse by rivaling Mujahideen groups. Many educated women and professional women were abducted and killed because the Mujahideen considered their minds to have been poisoned.

Women began to be more restricted after Hekmatyar was integrated into the Islamic State as Afghan Prime Minister in 1996. He demanded for women who appeared on TV to be fired.

=== First Islamic Emirate of Afghanistan (1996–2001) ===
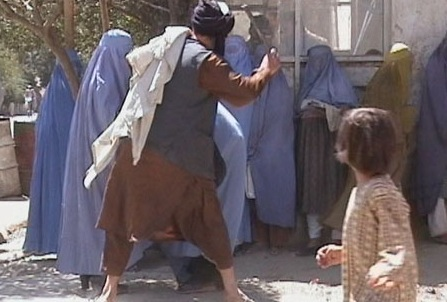
Taliban religious police beating a woman in Kabul filmed by RAWA on 26 August 2001

By 1996, the Taliban had seized control of most of the country, imposing their harshly restrictive policies on women. Like their leader Mullah Omar, most Taliban soldiers were poor villagers educated in Wahhabi schools in neighboring Pakistan. Pakistani Pashtuns also joined the group. The United Nations refused to recognize the Taliban government, with the United States imposing heavy sanctions, leading to extreme economic hardship.

The Taliban declared that women were forbidden to go to work and that they were not to leave their homes unless accompanied by a male family member. When they did go out, they were required to wear an all-covering burqa. Women were denied formal education and were usually forced to stay at home. During the Taliban's five-year rule, women in Afghanistan were essentially put under house arrest, and often forced to paint their windows over so that no one could see in or out. Some women who once held respectable positions were forced to wander the streets in their burqas, selling everything they owned or begging in order to survive.

Because most teachers had been women before the Taliban regime, the new restrictions on women's employment resulted in a rapid decline of available teachers, which put an immense strain on the education of both boys and girls. Although women were banned from most jobs, including teaching, some women in the medical field were allowed to continue working. This is because the Taliban required that women could be treated only by female physicians. Additionally widows without income were permitted to seek employment.

Several Taliban and Al-Qaeda commanders engaged in human trafficking, abducting women and selling them into forced prostitution and slavery in Pakistan. Time Magazine writes: "The Taliban often argued that the brutal restrictions they placed on women were actually a way of revering and protecting the opposite sex. The behavior of the Taliban during the six years they expanded their rule in Afghanistan made a mockery of that claim."

The Taliban made harsh regulations and carried out persecution of women after their first takeover of Afghanistan in September 1996. It became normal for young people to be armed with guns and carry out formal, harsh retribution and immediate flogging for perceived violation of religious laws. Some individuals perceived many human activities to be haram, excepting prayer, essential work for men, and other basic duties. Additional rules targeting women left them terrified, impoverished, deprived of access to education and healthcare, and emotionally or physically sick. Growing amounts of information and news from Afghanistan and Pakistan show that the Taliban misrepresents the teaching of Islam. Because most of them are unaware of and misunderstand the actual value of women, they support a government where terror exists.

=== Islamic Republic of Afghanistan (2001–2021) ===
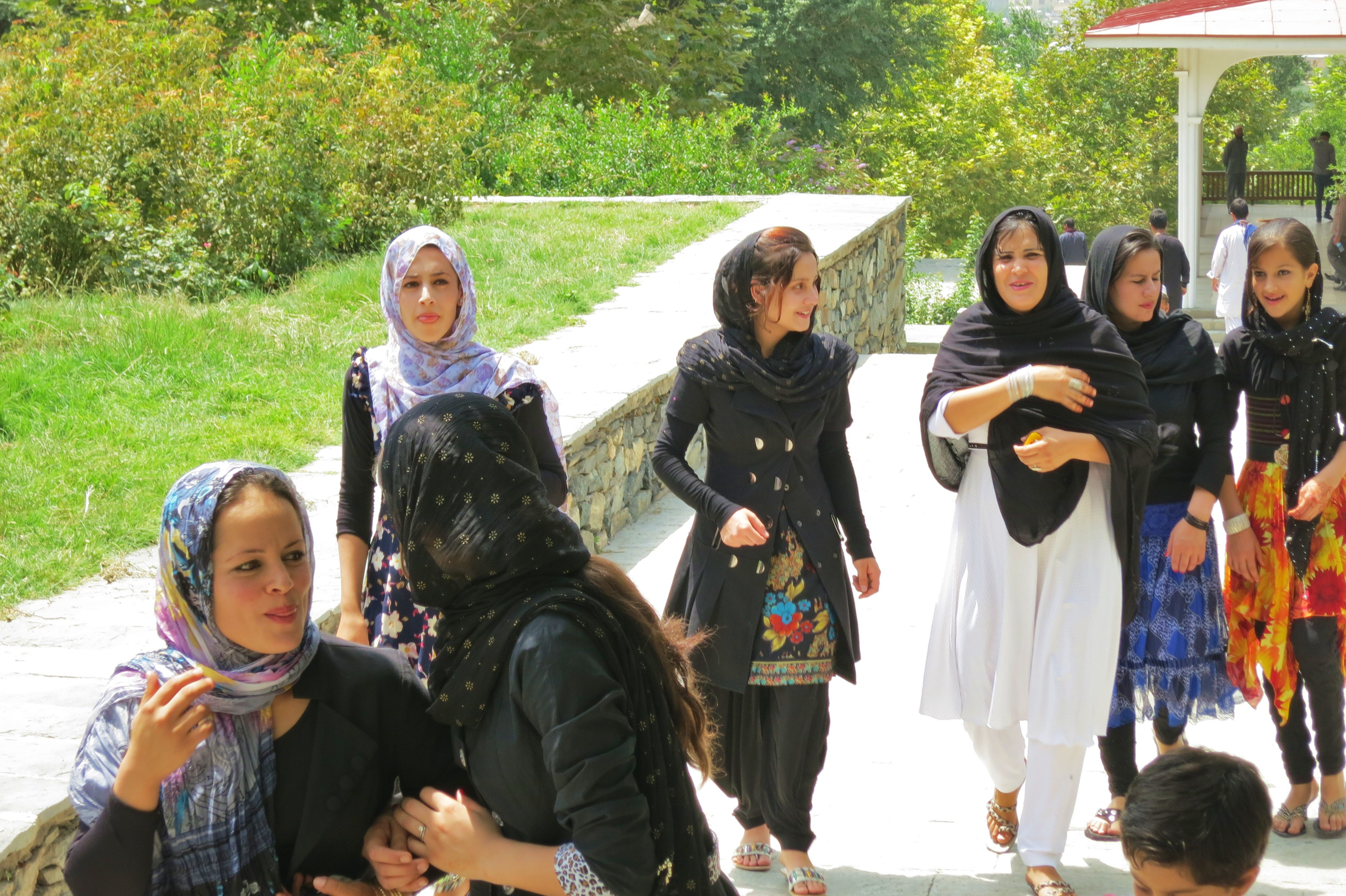
A group of Afghan women visiting the Gardens of Babur in Kabul in 2013

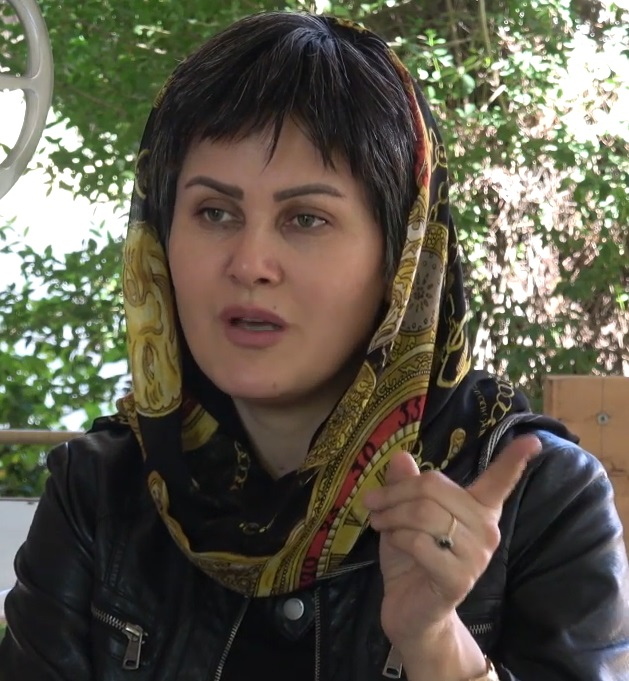
Sahraa Karimi was appointed the first female general director of Afghan Film in 2019.

In late 2001, the United States invaded Afghanistan, and a new government under Hamid Karzai was formed, which included women like in pre-1990s Afghanistan. Under the new constitution of 2004, 27 percent of the 250 seats in the House of the People were reserved for women.

It took many years for public perception of women to recover following years of Taliban rule. In January 2004, Afghanistan National Television aired a 1980s song by pop idol Salma, the first time state television aired a female singer in over a decade. This provoked criticism from conservative figures. The Supreme Court raised an objection to the state broadcaster which resisted the pressure, claiming the backing of the government and the Culture Minister who were in support.

In 2004, Article 22 of the Afghan Constitution allowed women to be treated equally, but this law was rarely enforced.

In March 2012, President Karzai endorsed a "code of conduct" which was issued by the Ulema Council. Some of the rules stated that "women should not travel without a male guardian and should not mingle with strange men in places such as schools, markets and offices." Karzai said that the rules were in line with Islamic law and that the code of conduct was written in consultation with Afghan women's group." Rights organizations and women activists said that by endorsing this code of conduct, Karzai was endangering "hard-won progress in women's right since the Taliban fell from power in 2001".

The overall situation for Afghan women improved during the 2000s, particularly in major urban areas, but those living in rural parts of the country still faced many problems. In 2013, Indian author Sushmita Banerjee was killed in Paktika province by militants for allegedly defying Taliban diktats. She was married to an Afghan businessman and had recently relocated to Afghanistan. Earlier she had escaped two instances of execution by the Taliban in 1995 and later fled to India. Her account of the escape became a Bollywood film, Escape from Taliban.

A 2011 government report found that 25 percent of the women and girls diagnosed with obstetric fistula, a preventable childbirth injury in which prolonged labor creates a hole in the birth canal, were younger than 16 when they married. In 2013, the United Nations published statistics showing a 20% increase in violence against women, often due to domestic violence being justified by conservative religion and culture. In February 2014, Afghanistan passed a law that included a provision that limits the ability of government to compel some family members to be witnesses to domestic violence. Human Rights Watch described the implementation of the 2009 Law on the Elimination of Violence Against Women as "poor," noting that some cases were ignored.

Under Afghan law, women across the country were permitted to drive vehicles. They were also permitted to participate in certain international events such as the Olympics and robot competitions. Despite this, human rights organizations, including Human Rights Watch and the United States Commission on International Religious Freedom have expressed concern at women's rights in the country. Georgetown Institute for Women, Peace and Security ranked Afghanistan as one of the worst countries for women.

The Times noted in 2017 that the country had slowly but steadily liberalized over the years, helped by the more progressive politics by the president of Afghanistan, Ashraf Ghani. According to the new law signed by president Ghani in September 2020, Afghan women were allowed to include their names on their children's birth certificates and identification cards. This law served as a major victory for Afghan women's rights activists, including Laleh Osmany, who campaigned under the social media hashtag #WhereIsMyName, for several years for both the parents' names to be included.

=== Second Islamic Emirate of Afghanistan (2021–) ===
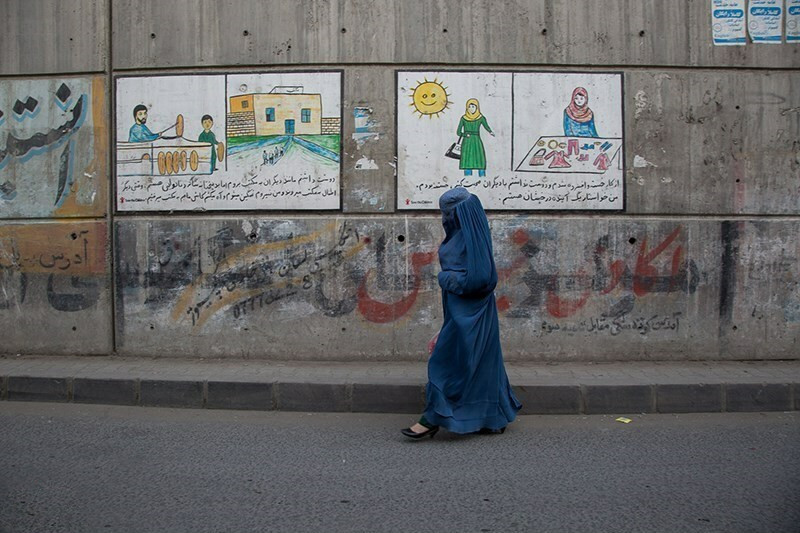
A burqa-clad woman in Kabul in September 2021

In August 2021, the Taliban returned to power and established a new all-male government. The government has not been recognized internationally except by Russia, since the international community linked recognition to respect for women's and minority rights.

Despite repeated assurances by the Taliban that women's rights would be respected, severe restrictions have been placed on their access to education and work. In some areas, the Taliban forced women to stop working altogether. Women have also been banned from most workplaces, including NGOs and UN agencies, with exceptions granted only in narrowly defined roles. Education in lower grades resumed only in classes segregated by gender. In higher grades (ages over 12) and at the university level, classes for girls and women were suspended. On 27 September 2021, the new chancellor of Kabul University, Mohammad Ashraf Ghairat, announced that women were not allowed to return to university to either study or work. These are the only bans in the entire world against female higher and secondary education on a formal level.

The Taliban cited security concerns as the reason for these measures, but did not specify under which conditions girls would be allowed to return to school. A spokesman for the Taliban claims that they are "working on mechanisms to provide transportation and other facilities that are required for a safer and better educational environment." This statement was also made in 2001 during the Taliban's first rule. At that time, no solution was implemented, and as of 2021, no solution seems to be in place. In response to these restrictions, some Afghan women have turned to online learning platforms.

Other than the restrictions placed on the access to education and work, women aren't allowed to leave the home without a male family member. This policy was implemented even before the U.S. withdrawal, in areas such as Helmand, where the Taliban ordered women not to leave their homes under threat of consequences. Freedom of movement may be restricted to protect "national security, public order, public health or morals or the rights and freedom of others." However, past actions taken by the Taliban would suggest that said security concerns have been used as a justification for restricting women's rights.

The new Taliban interim cabinet does not include any women as either ministers or deputy ministers. The Ministry of Women's Affairs was abolished, and in its place, the new Ministry for the Propagation of Virtue and the Prevention of Vice was installed. In mid-September 2021, the mayor of Kabul stated that "virtually every municipal city job held by women would be re-filled by men". The protests by women that followed these announcements, especially in Kabul, have been met with violence by the Taliban security forces.

Women have lost many places of community since the second Taliban takeover. In December 2021, public baths for women were closed in Balkh, while in November 2022, women were forbidden to go to parks and gyms. In December 2022, women-run bakeries in Kabul were forbidden. As of January 2023, they are also banned from visiting historical sites. Places run for women or by women have also been targeted. In July 2023, women-owned beauty salons were ordered to be closed.

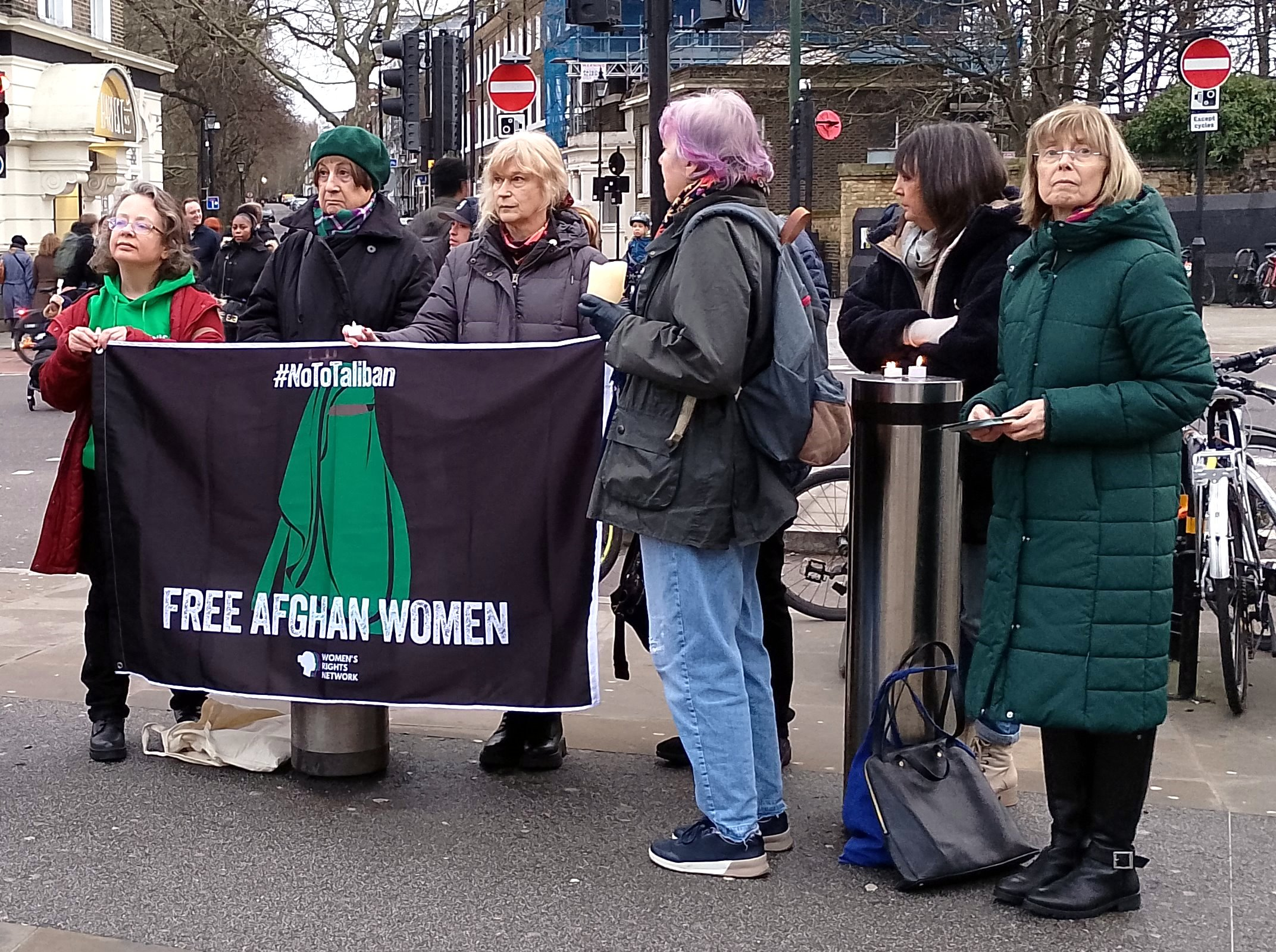
A protest in support of Afghan women in London, 2025

In May 2022, the Ministry for the Propagation of Virtue and the Prevention of Vice published a decree requiring all women in Afghanistan to wear full-body coverings when in public (either a burqa or an abaya paired with a niqāb, which leaves only the eyes uncovered). The decree said enforcement action including fines, prison time, or termination from government employment would be taken against male "guardians" who fail to ensure their female relatives abide by the law. Rights groups, including the United Nations Mission in Afghanistan, sharply criticized the decision. The decision is expected to adversely affect the Islamic Emirate's chances of international recognition.

In March 2024, Taliban's supreme leader, Hibatullah Akhundzada, announced the group was reinstating flogging and death by stoning for women, saying "the Taliban's work did not end with the takeover of Kabul, it has only just begun."

In August 2024, the Taliban enacted more policies under the Law on the Promotion of Virtue and Prevention of Vice, formalising a series of decrees into a comprehensive legal framework. The law imposes firm regulations on women's behaviour and appearance, including mandatory full-body coverings, restrictions on speech and movement and limitations on interactions with men outside their immediate family.

In October 2024, the European Court of Justice ruled that gender and nationality alone were sufficient reasons to grant Afghan women asylum in Europe.

Already in 2023, economic collapse, inconsistent donor support for health care, and Taliban restrictions on human rights seriously undermined the availability and quality of maternal and child health services. In December 2024, the Taliban ordered all private educational institutions in Afghanistan to stop female medical education. As a result of the order, institutions providing training in midwifery, dental prosthetics, nursing, and laboratory sciences were prohibited from enrolling or teaching female students. Heather Barr, at Human Rights Watch, said: "If you ban women from being treated by male healthcare professionals, and then you ban women from training to become healthcare professionals, the consequences are clear: women will not have access to healthcare and will die as a result."

Both UN Women and Human Rights Watch have termed the policies systematic gender apartheid and have pointed out that the restrictions contravene several international human rights covenants. The European Parliament has also termed it a "silent emergency," appealing for continued international engagement while insisting on a reinstatement of women's rights.

On 23 January 2025, International Criminal Court issued two warrants against the Taliban supreme leader Haibatullah Akhundzada and the Chief judge, Abdul Hakim Haqqani, for committing crimes against humanity with the oppression and persecution of Afghan women and girls by depriving their freedom of movement, the rights to control their bodies, to education, and to a private and family life. Alleged resistance and opposition are brutally suppressed with murder, imprisonment, torture, rape, and other forms of sexual violence, since 2021. ICC member states are obliged to arrest the wanted if they are on their territory.

In March 2026, Taliban authorities passed a new law which, among other permissible actions, allowed men to beat their wives as long as they didn't break bones or leave visible, permanent wounds. Human rights campaigners have warned that this decree would further worsen the already dire situation of Afghanistan's women.

== Violence against Afghan women ==
In 2015, the World Health Organization reported that 90% of women in Afghanistan had experienced at least one form of domestic violence. Violence against women in Afghanistan ranges from verbal abuse and psychological abuse to physical abuse and unlawful killing. According to UN Women, in 2018, more than one-third of Afghan women had experienced physical or sexual violence from an intimate partner in the preceding 12 months. Those rates are widely considered to be higher since the Taliban's return in 2021:

Since the Taliban takeover in 2021, risk factors for gender-based violence, including violence against women, have increased due to deepening economic hardship, restrictions on the education of girls, and the dismantling of legal protections and support systems for ending violence against women.

From infancy, girls and women are under the authority of their fathers or husbands. Their freedom of movement is restricted, and their choice of husbands is also restricted. A Taliban decree implicitly permits child marriage and has no minimum age protection. As of 2026, "Afghan women have almost no independent right to end their marriages." If they try to extricate themselves from the situation of abuse, they can face social stigma, imprisonment, or persecution, including honor killings.

As customs and traditions which are influenced by centuries-old patriarchal rules prevail, the issue of violence against women becomes pronounced. The high illiteracy rate among the population further perpetuates the problem; only 27% of Afghan women are able to read and write. Some women aligned with the Taliban can further perpetuate oppressive norms and practices, including rationalizing or accepting violence against women. Reversing this general acceptance of abuse was one of the main reasons behind the creation of the EVAW.

In 2009, the Elimination of Violence Against Women (EVAW) was signed into law. The EVAW was created by multiple organizations which were assisted by prominent women's rights activists in Kabul (namely UNIFEM, Rights & Democracy, Afghan Women's Network, the Women's Commission in the Parliament and the Afghan Ministry of Women's Affairs).

In March 2015, Farkhunda Malikzada, a 27-year-old Afghan woman was publicly beaten and slain by an angry mob of radical Muslims in Kabul on a false accusation of Quran desecration. A number of prominent public officials turned to Facebook immediately after her death to endorse the lynching. It was later revealed that she did not burn the Quran.

In 2018, Amnesty International reported that violence against women was perpetrated by both state and non-state actors.

In April 2020, HRW reported that in Afghanistan, women with disabilities faced all forms of discrimination and sexual harassment while they are accessing government assistance, health care and schools. The report also detailed everyday barriers which women and girls faced in one of the world's poorest countries.

On 14 August 2020, Fawzia Koofi, a member of Afghanistan's peace negotiating team, was wounded in an assassination attempt near the capital, Kabul, while she was returning from a visit to the northern province of Parwan. Fawzia Koofi was a part of a 21-member team which is charged with representing the Afghan government in upcoming peace talks with the Taliban.

Also in 2020, a 33-year-old Afghan woman was attacked by three people while she was on her way from work to her home. She was shot and stabbed in her eyes with a knife. The woman survived the attack, but she lost her eyesight. The Taliban denied allegations and said that the attack was carried out on her father's order, as he vehemently opposed her working outside of home.

Following the Taliban return in 2021, in a matter of days, women conducted peaceful protests in an effort to counter new restraints on women's rights. The Taliban responded violently throughout, using live rounds of ammunition, batons, and whips in an effort to suppress protests, leaving injuries and deaths. Some of these incidents included gunfire into the air and attacks on protesters in Faizabad in an effort to disperse a rally, while in Kabul protesters were beaten and detained, including several women and up to 15 reporters. With protests in a number of different provinces, beginning in Herat, Taliban actions quickly reached a fever pitch, resulting in a ban on unauthorized protests by early September. The actions severely restricted freedom of assembly and violated the International Bill of Human Rights, beginning a systemic crackdown on protests and women's rights in Afghanistan.

As of 2022, United Nations Human Rights Council reported that one or two women in Afghanistan are committing suicide every day. UN human rights chief Michelle Bachelet condemned the massive unemployment of women, the restrictions placed on the way they dress, and their access to basic services.

On 12 August 2022, the UN human rights experts urged the international community to take stringent actions to protect Afghans from human rights violations including arbitrary detention, summary executions, internal displacement, and unlawful restrictions on their human rights, in particular those most likely to be affected such as women and girls and vulnerable citizens. Since the takeover of Afghanistan by the Taliban in August 2021, the UN has reported a plethora of human rights violations committed by the Taliban, with their virtual erasure and systematic oppression of women and girls from society being particularly egregious.

A Taliban decree in March 2026 permitted men to physically abuse their wives, as long as they did not break their bones or cause visible wounds. A violation of this law can lead to just 15 days imprisonment, while the death penalty is approved by the Taliban regime for violations such as heresy or theft.

== Intimate partner violence and honor killings ==
The most common type of violence against women worldwide is intimate relationship violence (IPV). For more than 40 years, violence against women in Afghanistan has coincided with high conflicts. Many Afghan women report having been the victim of physical, spiritual, or sexual insults by their romantic partners. Physical violence accounts for the majority in Afghanistan. Also, possessing a respondent or husband with at least a primary education was associated with the lowest level of reporting violence. Afghan women have a high incidence of IPV backstory, and several sociodemographic parameters, such as conflicts in Afghanistan and level of education, make them more susceptible.

=== Honor killings ===
In Afghan families, there is a marked difference between private and public behavior. In private, ideas and responsibilities are often shared, and individual personality can outweigh traditional subordinate roles. Moral misconduct may be tolerated until it becomes public, at which point severe punishment is expected to preserve male and family honor. Public reputation is paramount, which is why urban women typically show restraint in public, while rural women are expected to appear properly submissive. A family's social standing depends heavily on the public behavior of its female members, with deviations from accepted roles leading to moral condemnation and social exclusion.

In 2012, Afghanistan recorded 240 cases in which women were the victims of honor killings. Of the reported honor killings, 21% of them were committed by the victims' husbands, 7% of them were committed by their brothers, 4% of them were committed by their fathers, and the rest of them were committed by other relatives of the victims.

In May 2017, the United Nations Assistance Mission in Afghanistan concluded that the vast majority of the perpetrators of honor killings were not punished.

On 12 July 2021, a woman in Faryab Province was beaten to death by Taliban militants and her house was set alight.

In Balkh Province in August 2021, Taliban militants killed an Afghan woman because she was wearing tight clothing and because she was not being accompanied by a male relative.

== Politics and workforce ==
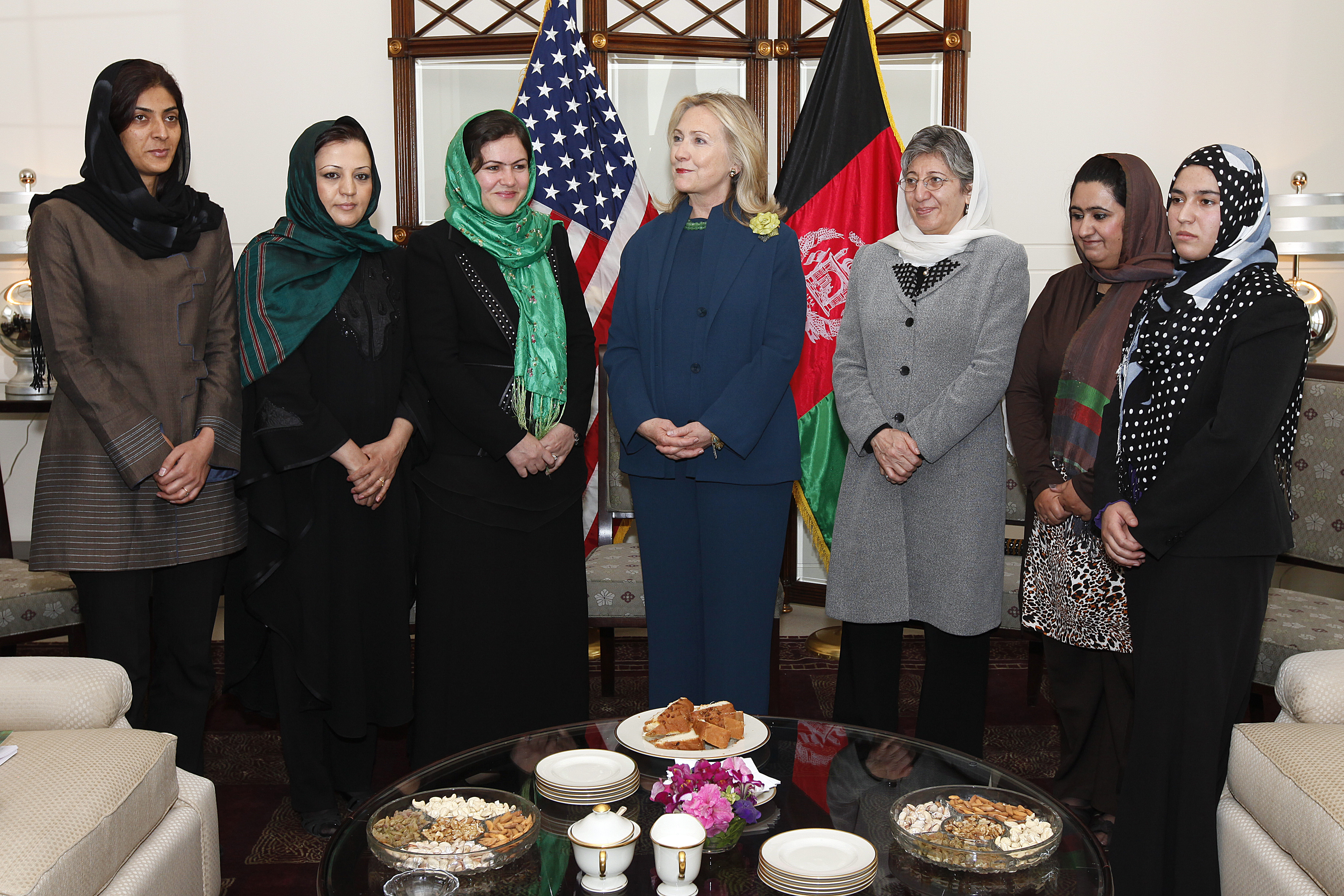
U.S. Secretary of State Hillary Clinton standing with Afghan female politicians, which includes Sima Samar to her left, Fauzia Koofi (with the green headscarf) to her right, and Selay Ghaffar to her farthest right

A large number of Afghan women served as members of parliament until the Fall of Kabul in early 2021. Some of these included Shukria Barakzai, Fauzia Gailani, Nilofar Ibrahimi, Fauzia Koofi, and Malalai Joya. Several women also took positions as ministers, including Suhaila Seddiqi, Sima Samar, Husn Banu Ghazanfar, and Suraya Dalil. Habiba Sarabi became the first female governor in Afghanistan. She also served as Minister of Women's Affairs. Azra Jafari became the first female mayor of Nili, the capital of Daykundi Province. As of December 2018, Roya Rahmani is the first-ever female Afghan ambassador to the United States. In September 2020, Afghanistan has secured a seat on the U.N. Commission on the Status of Women for the first time, an achievement that is seen as a "sign of progress for a country once notorious for the oppression of women".

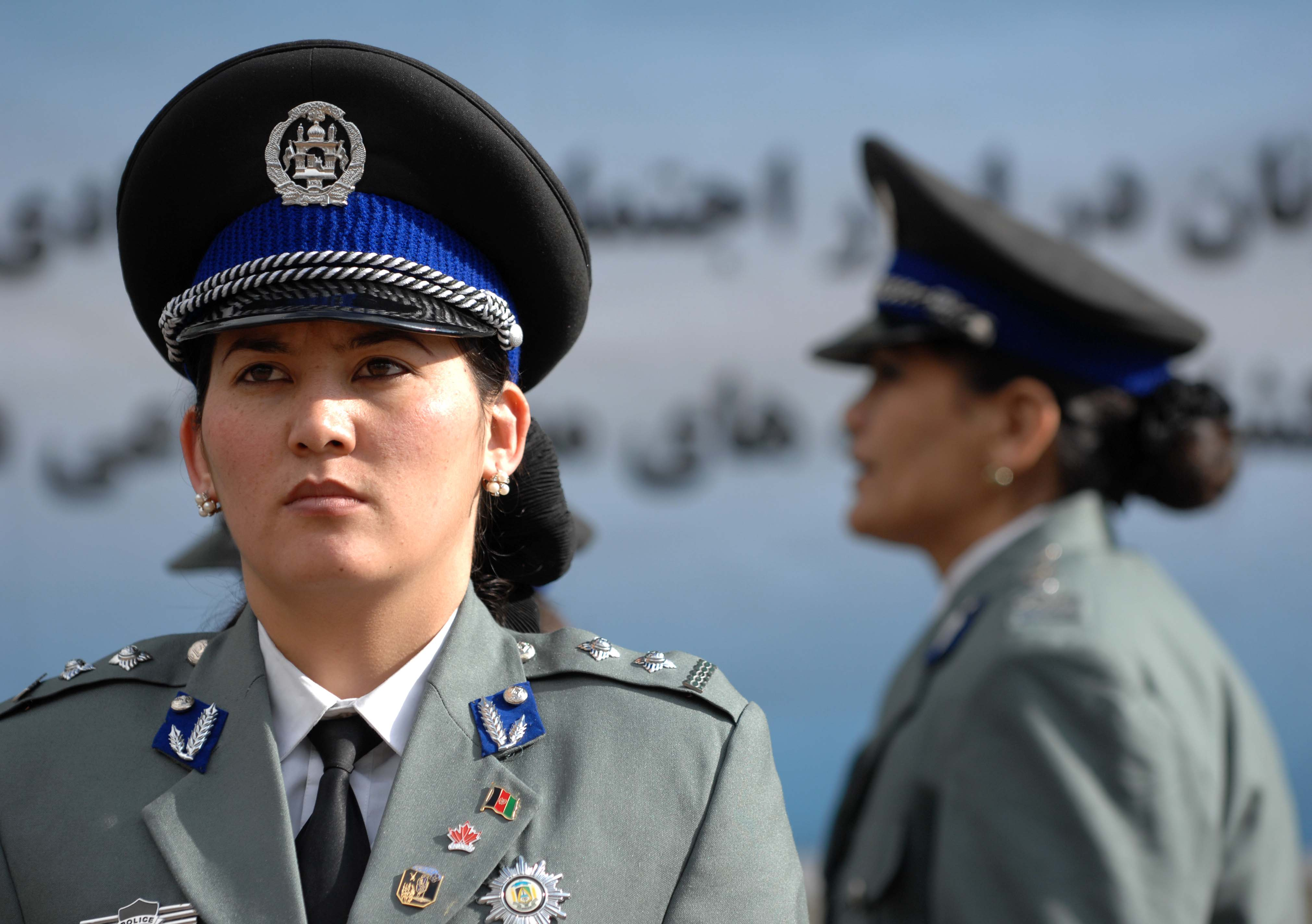
Female officers of the Afghan National Police, 2010

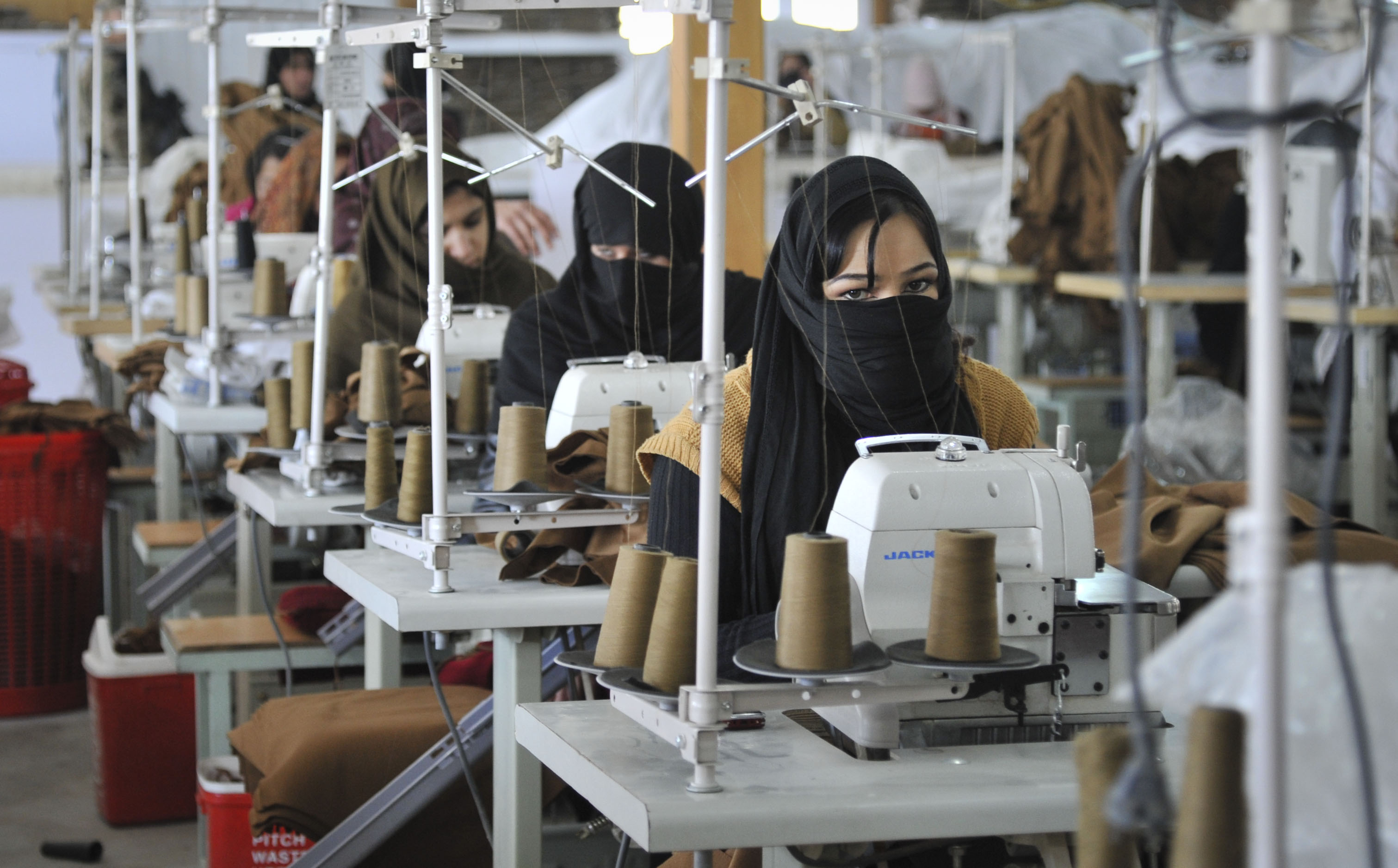
Machine embroidery is very popular in Afghanistan. Almost every household owns a sewing machine.

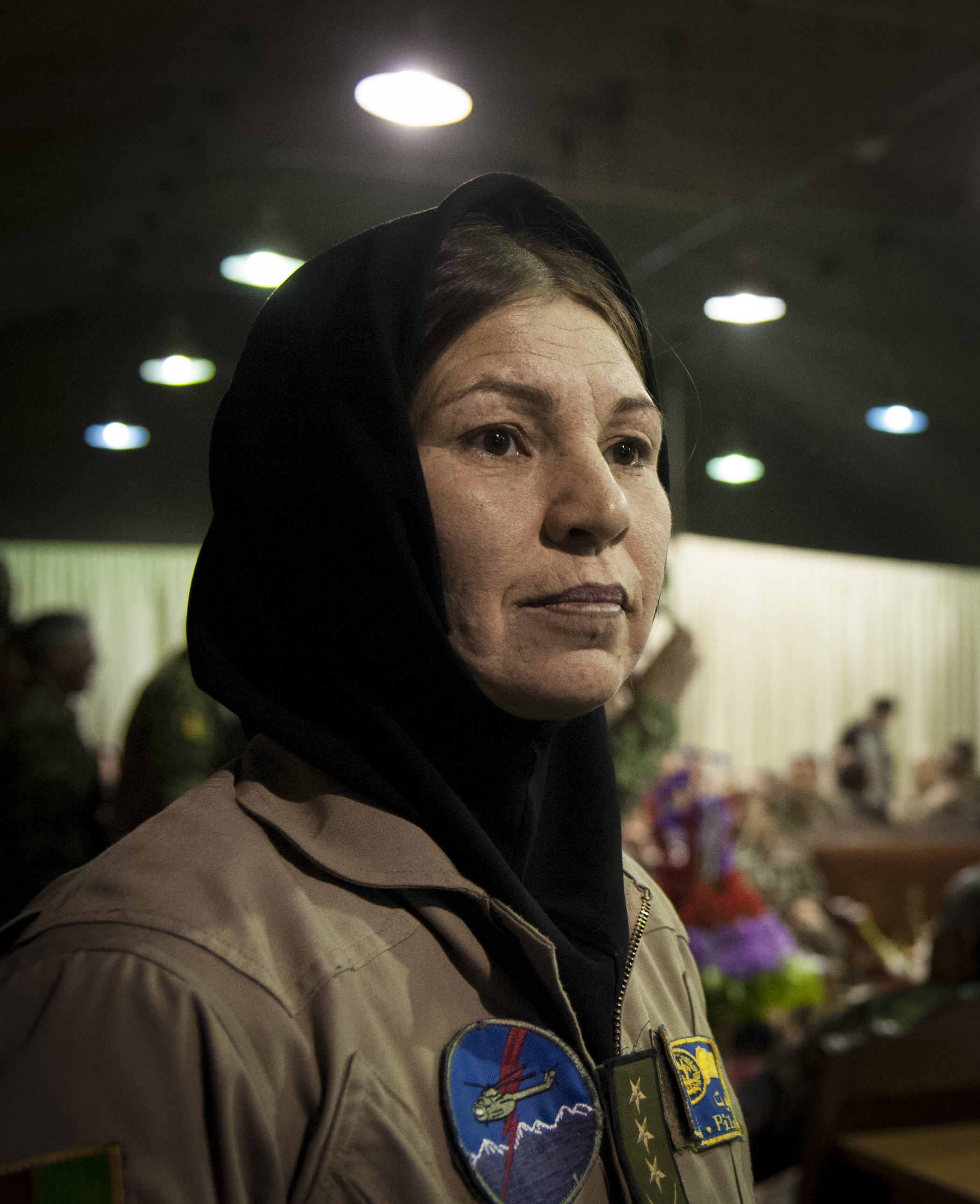
Colonel Latifa Nabizada of the Afghan Air Force in 2013

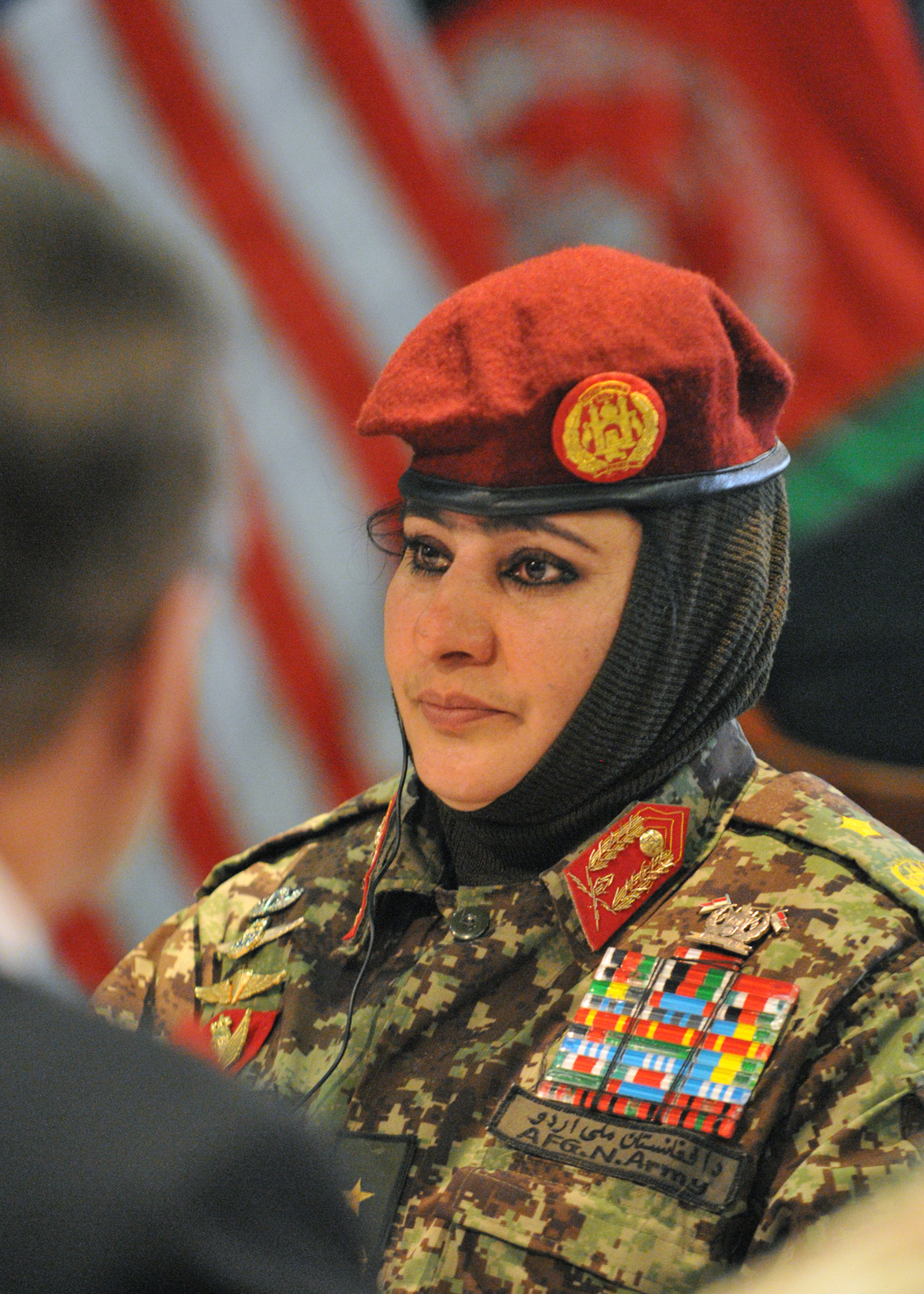
Brigadier-General Khatool Mohammadzai of the Afghan National Army in 2012

The Afghan National Security Forces (ANSF), which included the Afghan National Police, had a growing number of female officers. One of the Afghan National Army Brigadier generals was Khatol Mohammadzai. In 2012, Niloofar Rahmani became the first female pilot in the Afghan Air Force pilot training program to fly solo in a fixed-wing aircraft, following the footsteps of Colonel Latifa Nabizada, the first Afghan female pilot ever to fly a military helicopter. Other notable Afghan women include Naghma, Aryana Sayeed, Seeta Qasemi, Yalda Hakim, Roya Mahboob, Aziza Siddiqui, Mary Akrami, Suraya Pakzad, Wazhma Frogh, Shukria Asil, Shafiqa Quraishi, Maria Bashir, Maryam Durani, Malalai Bahaduri, and Nasrin Oryakhil.

The most popular traditional work for women in Afghanistan is tailoring, and a large percentage of the population are professional tailors working from home. Since the initial fall of the Taliban, women had returned to work in Afghanistan. Some became entrepreneurs by starting businesses. For example, Meena Rahmani became the first woman in Afghanistan to open a bowling center in Kabul. Many others were employed by companies and small businesses. Some engaged in singing, acting, and news broadcasting. In 2015, 17-year-old Negin Khpolwak became Afghanistan's first female music conductor.

In 2014, women made up 16.1% of the labor force in Afghanistan. Because the nation has a struggling economy overwhelmed with massive unemployment, women often could find work where they received sufficient pay. One area of the economy where women played a significant role was in agriculture. Of the number of Afghans employed in the agriculture field or similar occupations, about 30 percent of them are women. In some areas in Afghanistan, women may spend as much time working on the land as men do, but still often earned three times less than men in wages.

In terms of percentage, women ranked high in the fields of medicine and media, and were working their way into the field of justice. Because women were highly encouraged to consult a female physician when they went to the hospital, nearly fifty percent of all Afghans in the medical profession were women. The number of women having professions in the media was also rising. It was reported in 2008 that nearly a dozen of television stations had all-female anchors as well as female producers.

However, even the women that were given the opportunity to have careers had to struggle to balance their home life with their work life, as household tasks are seen as primarily female duties. Since the Afghan economy was weak, very few women could afford to hire domestic helpers, so they were forced to take care of all the household work primarily on their own. Those who chose to work had to labour twice as hard because they were essentially holding two jobs.

Airlines had welcomed Afghan women in various roles. The national airline, Ariana Afghan Airlines, said that 30 percent of its workforce was women as of 2020. Private airline Kam Air also had over a hundred women in employment. In February 2021, Kam Air operated the first flight with an all-female crew, including an Afghan pilot, in a domestic flight from Kabul to Herat.

=== Post-2021 Taliban return ===
Under Taliban rule, women have been banned from working in the government, and the private workforce, including international NGOs. An exception is technically made for nurses and midwives, since women can be prohibited from seeing male doctors; however, a December 2, 2024 edict declared that Afghan women were no longer allowed to pursue medical education. Women who do continue to work in healthcare often face high levels of threats, harassment and gender discrimination.

While about one-fourth of the female Afghan population works or is looking for work (a very low proportion by global standards), most of those are "forced into low-paying, unstable jobs in the informal economy."

== Education ==
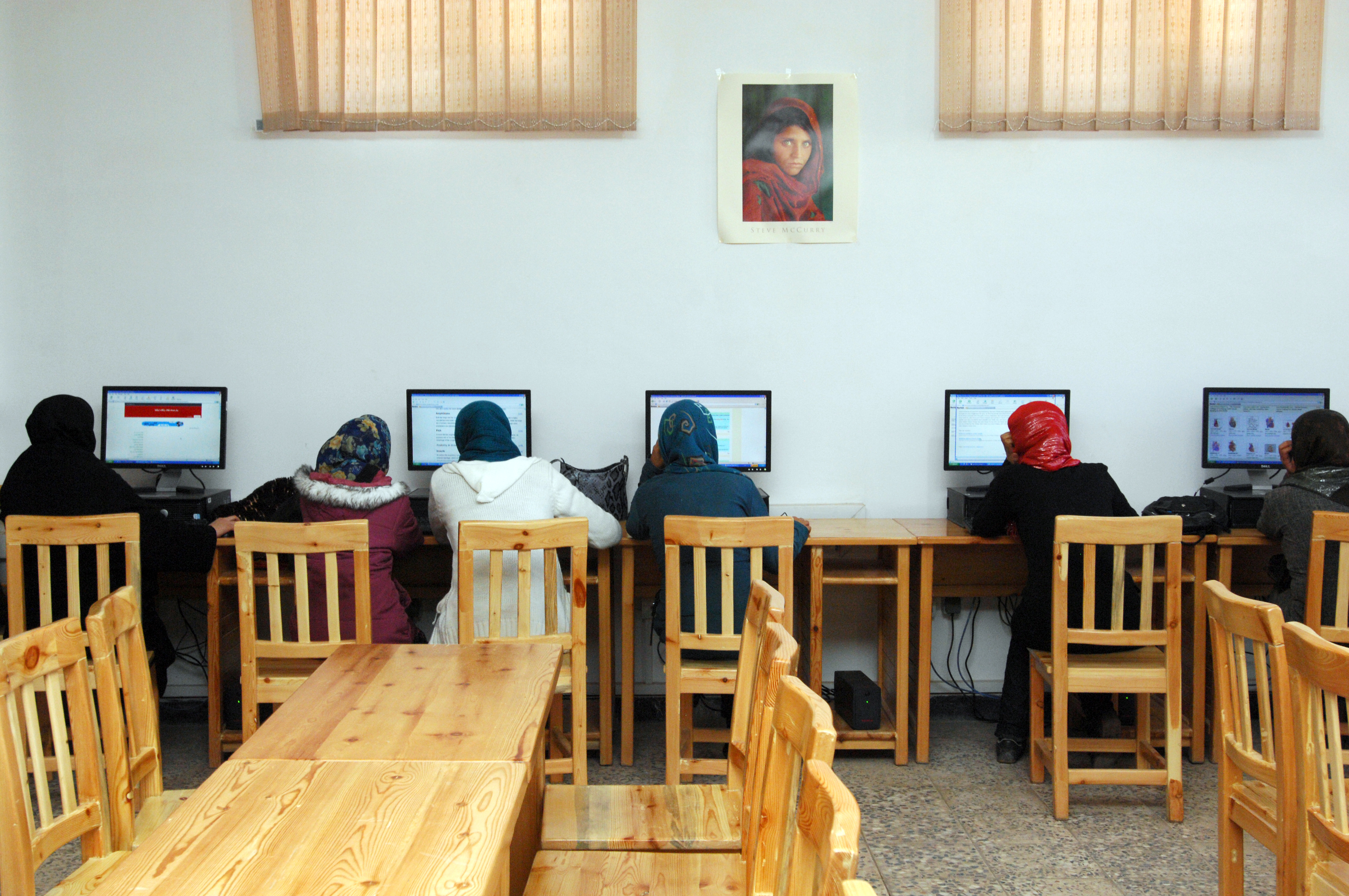
Female students at Herat University in the western Afghan city of Herat.

Education in Afghanistan has gradually improved in the 21st century but much more has to be done to bring it to the international standard. The literacy rate for females is merely 24.2%. Before the second Taliban takeover, there were around 9 million students in the country. Of this, about 60% were males and 40% females. Over 174,000 students were enrolled in different universities around the country; about 21% of these were females.

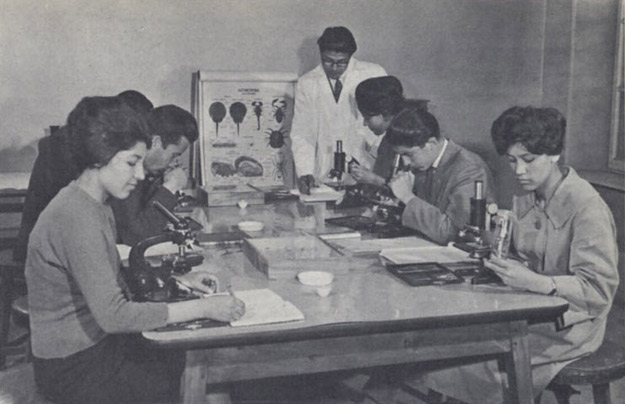
A biology class at Kabul University during the late 1950s or early 1960s.

In the early twentieth century, education for women was extremely rare due to the lack of schools for girls. Occasionally girls were able to receive an education on the primary level but they never moved past the secondary level. During Zahir Shah's reign (1933–1973), education for women became a priority, and girls were taught discipline, new technologies, ideas, and socialization in society.

Kabul University was opened to girls in 1947 and by 1973 there were an estimated 150,000 girls in schools across Afghanistan. Despite marriage at a young age contributing to the high drop out rate, more and more girls were entering professions that were once viewed as only being for men. Women were being given new opportunities to earn better lives for both themselves and their families. However, after the civil war and the takeover by the Taliban, women were stripped of these opportunities and sent back to their homes, which were controlled by their husbands and fathers.

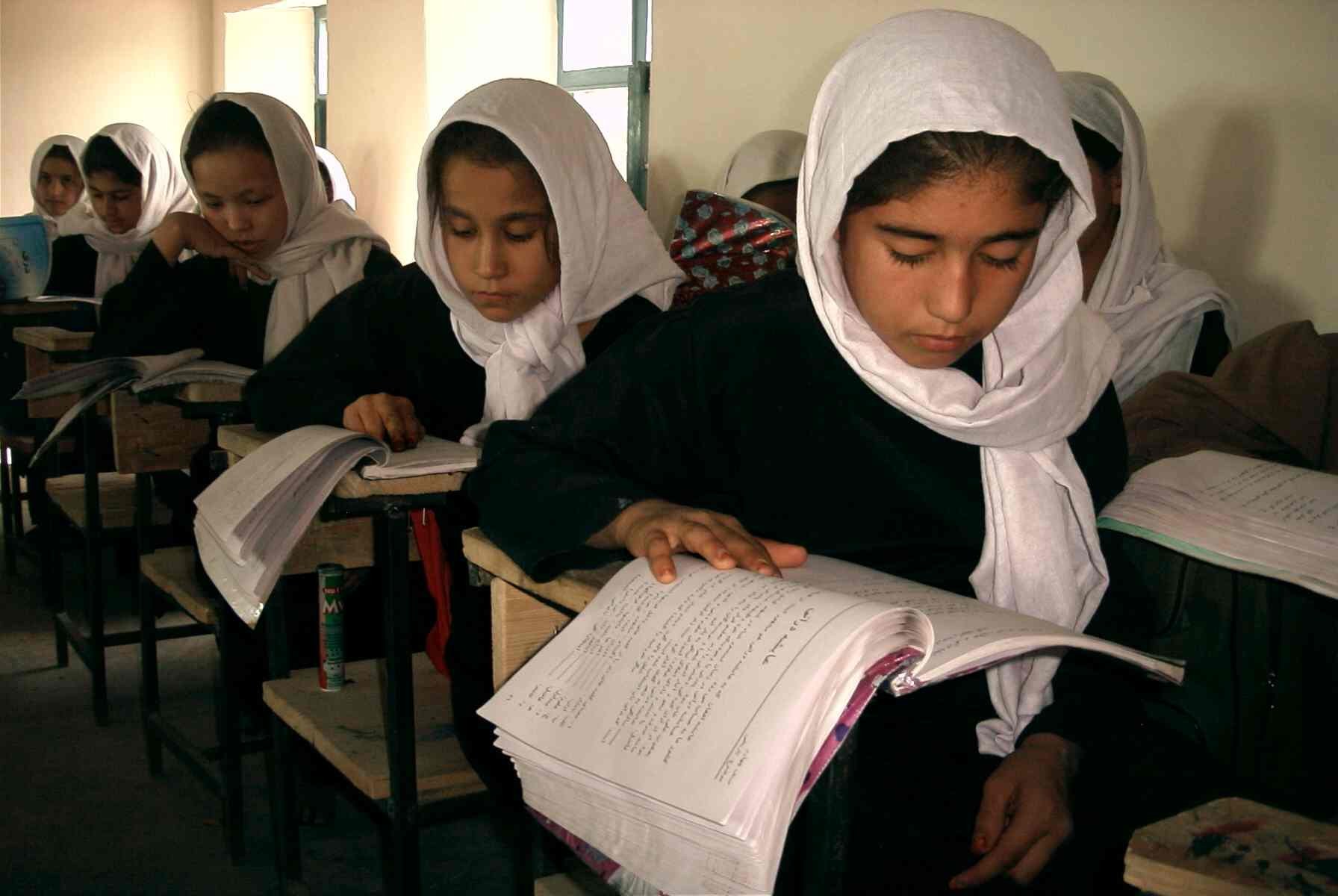
Female school students in Samangan Province (2006)

During the Taliban regime, many women who had previously been teachers began secretly giving an education to young girls (as well as some boys) in their neighborhoods, teaching from ten to sixty children at a time. The homes of these women became community homes for students, and were entirely financed and managed by women. News about these secret schools spread through word of mouth from woman to woman. Each day, young girls would hide all their school supplies, such as books, notebooks and pencils, underneath their burqas to go to school. At these schools, young girls were taught basic literary skills, numeracy skills, and various other subjects such as biology, chemistry, English, Quranic Studies, cooking, sewing, and knitting. Many women involved in teaching were caught by the Taliban and persecuted, jailed, and tortured.

After the fall of the Islamic Republic in 2021, strict bans on female education were reinstated by the Taliban. Girls were prohibited in March 2022 from studying in secondary schools after the age of around 12. The ban on women studying in universities was expanded nationwide in December 2022. Afghanistan is today the only nation in the entire world in which girls are officially forbidden from getting higher and secondary education.

A 2025 academic study of 150 Afghan women aged 20–25 enrolled in an online university found that while digital technologies offered access to educational resources, access levels varied significantly. About 33.3% of respondents indicated moderate access, 30% reported significant access, and only 13.3% felt they had extreme access. Meanwhile, 6.7% of participants reported no access at all, suggesting persistent challenges in reaching online educational platforms.

Such limitations have met general condemnation. UNESCO regards banning women and girls from schools as a denial of universal principles of individual freedoms and a hindrance to Afghanistan's progress. UN Women has labeled Taliban policies as "gender-based apartheid," highlighting that millions of Afghan women and girls have been shut out from school and an educational future.

Notwithstanding these issues, international support for Afghan women continues. Kabul University launched in 2015 the nation's first master's degree in women's and gender studies. Moreover, Kazakhstan collaborated with the European Union and the United Nations Development Programme in introducing scholarship opportunities for Afghan women to attend college abroad. As of 2019, close to 900 Afghan women had completed these programs, and many became employed in some capacity in government, law enforcement, medicine, and journalism.

== Employment ==
Prior to the return of the Taliban in 2021, women were engaged in multiple fields of profession such as education, medicine, media, law, and government. Although there were issues, legal safeguards and foreign assistance had established an expanding space for women's work throughout Afghanistan, including through the establishment of non-governmental organisations such as by Jamila Saadat in Jalalabad.

Since 2021, there has been a sweeping prohibition, however, by the Taliban on women's inclusion in the labor force. In December 2022, Afghan women were prohibited from working for domestic and foreign non-governmental organizations (NGOs). In April 2023, female staff working for United Nations agencies were also banned. Narrow exceptions are only granted in limited sectors, namely healthcare and girls 'primary education. Furthermore, the ban on female education has not only restricted women's rights, but has also led to a significant shortage of female healthcare workers, as almost all training programs for women in the medical field have been halted.

The prohibitions have had far-reaching consequences, including for humanitarian service delivery, as numerous aid organizations depend on women workers reaching women and children. The bans also reduced women's economic participation sharply, thrusting families into greater poverty. International organizations, including Human Rights Watch and the UN, condemned these bans on work as a denial of basic human rights and an obstacle for Afghanistan's economic recovery.

== Legal rights ==
In the early 2000s and 2010s, progress had been made in legalizing women's rights in Afghanistan through actions such as the formation of the Ministry of Women's Affairs and adoption of the Elimination of Violence Against Women (EVAW) law. These have since been reversed significantly since 2021. The Ministry of Women's Affairs was disbanded and replaced by the Ministry for the Propagation of Virtue and the Prevention of Vice, an institution responsible for enforcing the Taliban's interpretation of Islamic law. Women now face severe legal restrictions. In many areas, they are unable to file complaints or appear in court without a male guardian. Divorce rights have been curtailed, custodianship laws overwhelmingly favor men, and women's ability to travel, work, or appear in public is tightly controlled by religious police.

The abolitions of legal safeguards also undermined women's ability to seek protection and justice against domestic abuse or violence. With all protection measures now repealed, victims of gender-based violence are left more vulnerable and with less chance for legal redress. All female prosecutors, judges, and lawyers were ousted from office from various areas, along with legal aid centers serving women. All of those cuts deprived women of legal representation and support networks, further making women vulnerable under the current regime.

== Sports ==
Before the return to power of the Taliban in 2021, Afghan sportswomen had become a symbol of change for many in Afghanistan, representing hope for a more egalitarian society with greater opportunities for girls and women. Despite this, for a young sportswoman to succeed, she needed not only to excel in her field, but also to navigate family pressures and social taboos which did not favour women playing sport.

Many family members, especially men, wondered whether women should be involved in sports. Some girls took up sports in secret, unbeknownst to their families. For some families, sport was seen as inappropriate and even dishonorable for women, but not all families created these obstacles.

Women are threatened to stop partaking in sport activities. Threats often take the form of warnings to women athletes to stop their sport altogether, or to make changes such as in their clothing while playing sports.

In the decades before 2021, Afghan women participated in futsal, football, basketball, skiing and various other sports. In 2015, Afghanistan held its first marathon; among those who ran the entire marathon was one woman, Zainab, age 25, who thus became the first Afghan woman to run in a marathon within her own country.

In 2000 Afghanistan was expelled from the Olympic games due to the oppression of women and various abuses of human rights. However, in 2004, three years after the fall of the Taliban regime, Afghanistan sent women athletes to the Olympics for the first time. Since then, only four women have competed in the Olympics under the Afghan flag. The apex of women's athletics in Afghanistan may have come during the 2012 London Olympic Games, when Tahimina Kohistani represented Afghanistan in the women's 100-metre sprint. She did not win the competition, but she saw it as a way to publicly show the conditions in her home nation. Another important figure was Awista Ayub, who funded the Afghan Youth Sports Exchange and was responsible for the spread of women's football throughout all of Afghanistan. In 2018, Samira Ashgari became the first Afghan appointed to the International Olympic Committee, and at 25 years old she was one of the youngest members in Afghan IOC history.

Robotics sports became prominent in Afghanistan through the efforts of Roya Mahboob and the Afghan Girls Robotics Team, also known as the Afghan Dreamers, in 2017. They were brought to international attention when they competed in the FIRST Global Challenge robotics competition in Washington, D.C., where they won silver. Along with participating in competitions, the team has since built machines and robots to help with several problems, including solar-powered robots for farmers and lack of ventilators in Afghanistan during the COVID-19 pandemic in Afghanistan. However, after the second Taliban takeover in 2021, many members of the team were forced to evacuate, with some going to Qatar. The team continues to build robots and compete, and have been featured in multiple documentaries or films, including 2023 documentary Afghan Dreamers and 2025 film Rule Breakers.

Afghanistan's women's cricket team captain, Diana Barakzai, cites the challenges to involving girls in sport, including that women "are victims of unacceptable rules that prevented them leaving the house". When Afghanistan fell, yet again, to the Taliban in 2021, the Afghan women's cricket team fled to Australia with the assistance of Australian sports journalist Tracey Holmes, and University of Canberra sports integrity researcher, Dr Catherine Ordway.

== Marriage and parenting ==
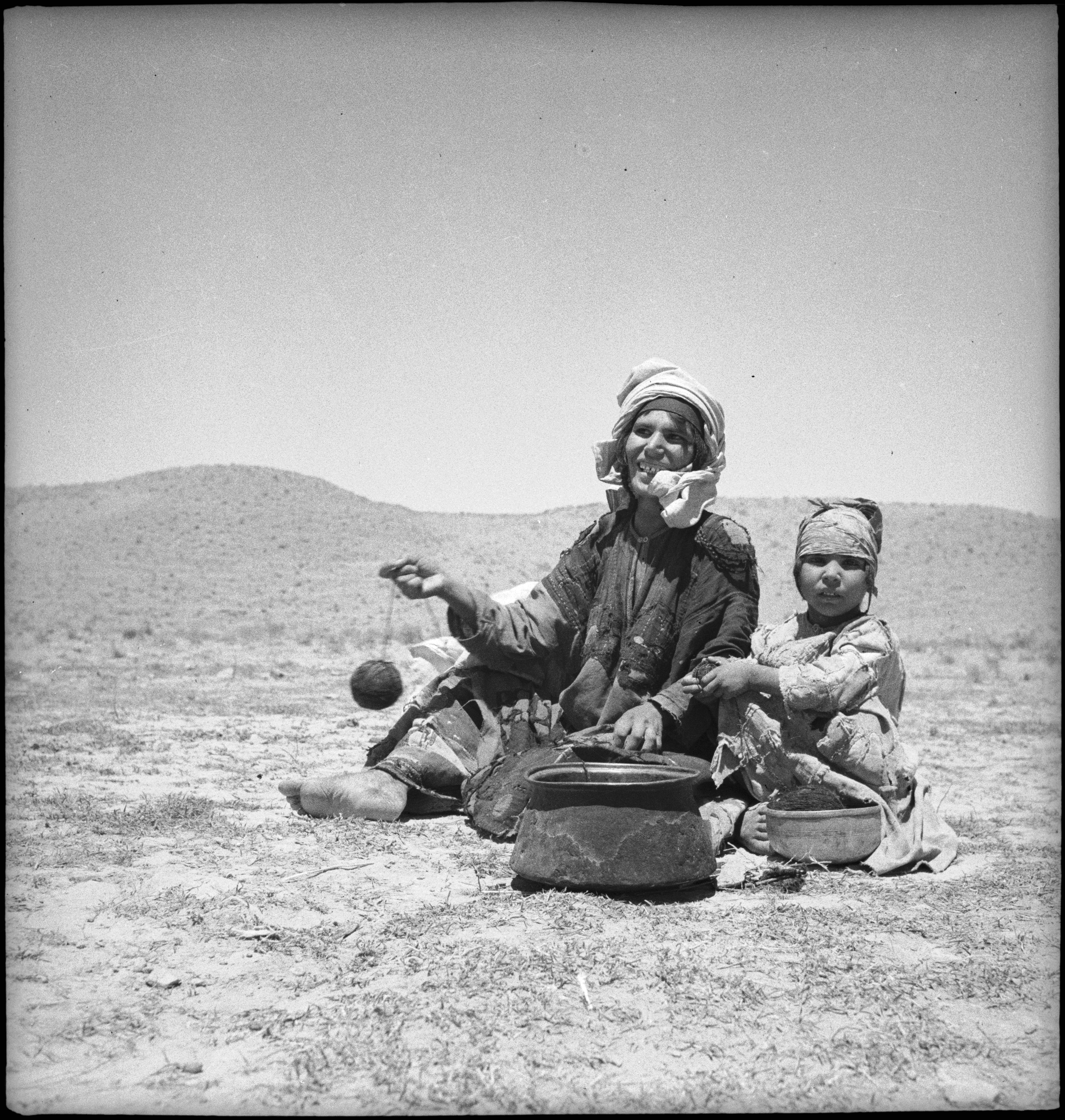
A mother with her child in Herat Province, 1939

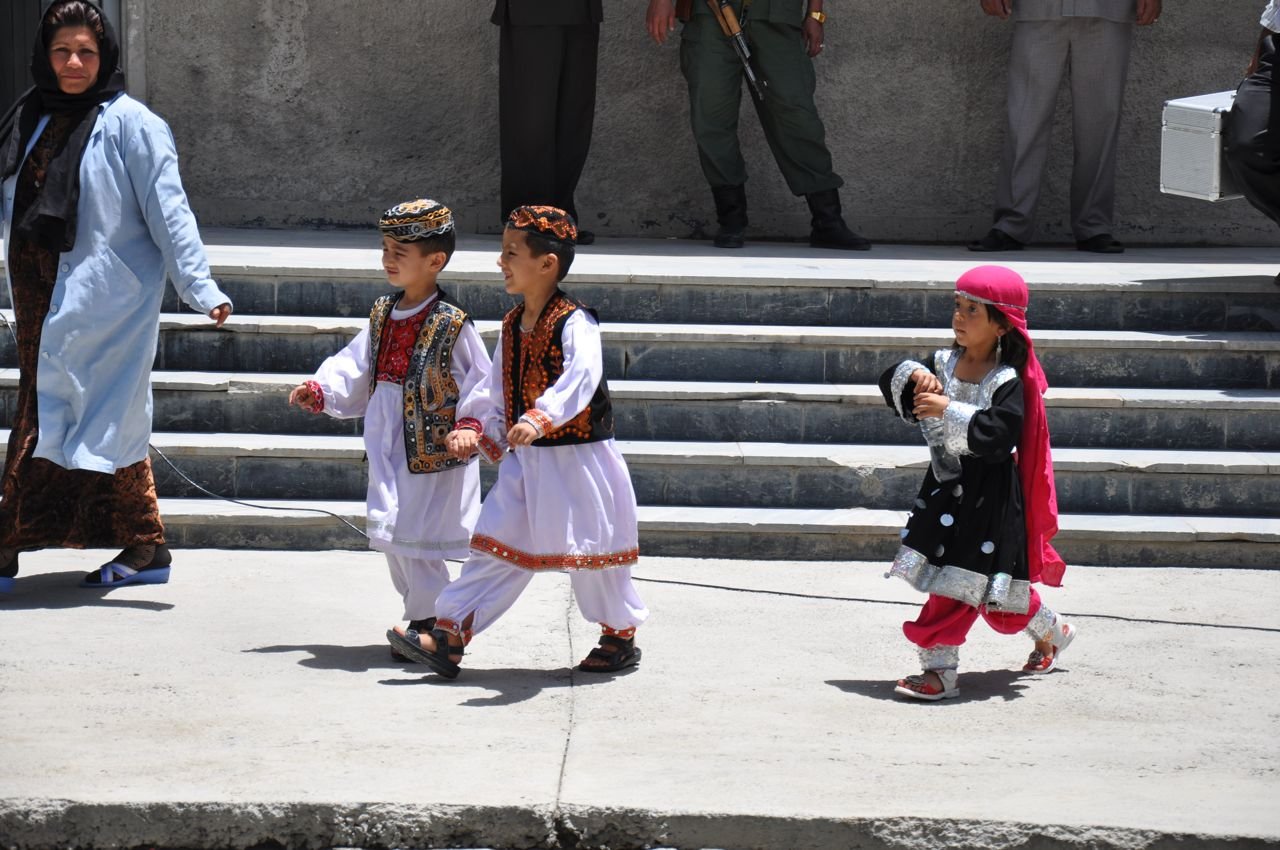
A mother with her children on Mothers' Day in Kabul

Marriages in Afghanistan are usually in accordance with Islam and the culture of Afghanistan. The legal age for marriage in Afghanistan is 16. Afghans marry each other based on religious sect, ethnicity, and tribal association. It is rare to see a marriage between a Sunni Pashtun and a Shia Hazara. The nation is a patriarchal society where it is commonly believed that elder men are entitled to make decisions for their families. A man can divorce his wife without the need for her agreement, whereas the opposite is not the case.

The country has a high total fertility rate, at 5.33 children born/woman as of 2015. Contraception use is low: 21.2% of women, as of 2010/11.

Arranged marriages and forced marriages are reported in Afghanistan. After a marriage is arranged, the two families sign a contract which both parties are socially and culturally obligated to honor. Among low-income families, it is common for the groom to pay a bride price to the bride's family. The price is negotiated only among the parents. The bride price is viewed as compensation for the money that the bride's family has had to spend on her care and upbringing. In almost 50% of cases, the bride is younger than 18 and in 15% of marriages, the bride is younger than 15. Sometimes women resort to suicide to escape these marriages.

In certain areas, women and girls are sometimes bartered in a method of dispute resolution which is called a baad. Proponents of baad claim that it helps prevent enmity and violence between families, although the women themselves are sometimes subjected to a considerable amount of violence both before and after their marriages into families through baad. The practice of baad is technically illegal in Afghanistan.

Under the Afghan law, "if a woman seeks a divorce then she has to have the approval of her husband and needs witnesses who can testify in court that the divorce is justified." The first occurrence in which a woman divorced a man in Afghanistan was the divorce which was initiated by Rora Asim Khan, who divorced her husband in 1927. This event was considered unique at the time when it occurred, but it was an exception, because Rora Asim Khan was a foreign citizen, who obtained her divorce with the assistance of the German embassy.

While it is legal for male citizens to marry foreign non-Muslims, it is illegal for female citizens to do so, and Afghan law considers all Afghan citizens Muslims.

Up until 17 September 2020, Afghan law dictated that only the father's name should be recorded on identification cards. President Ashraf Ghani signed into law an amendment which was long sought by women's rights campaigners since a campaign which garnered high-profile support from celebrities and members of parliament was launched three years ago under the hashtag #WhereIsMyName.

== Gallery ==
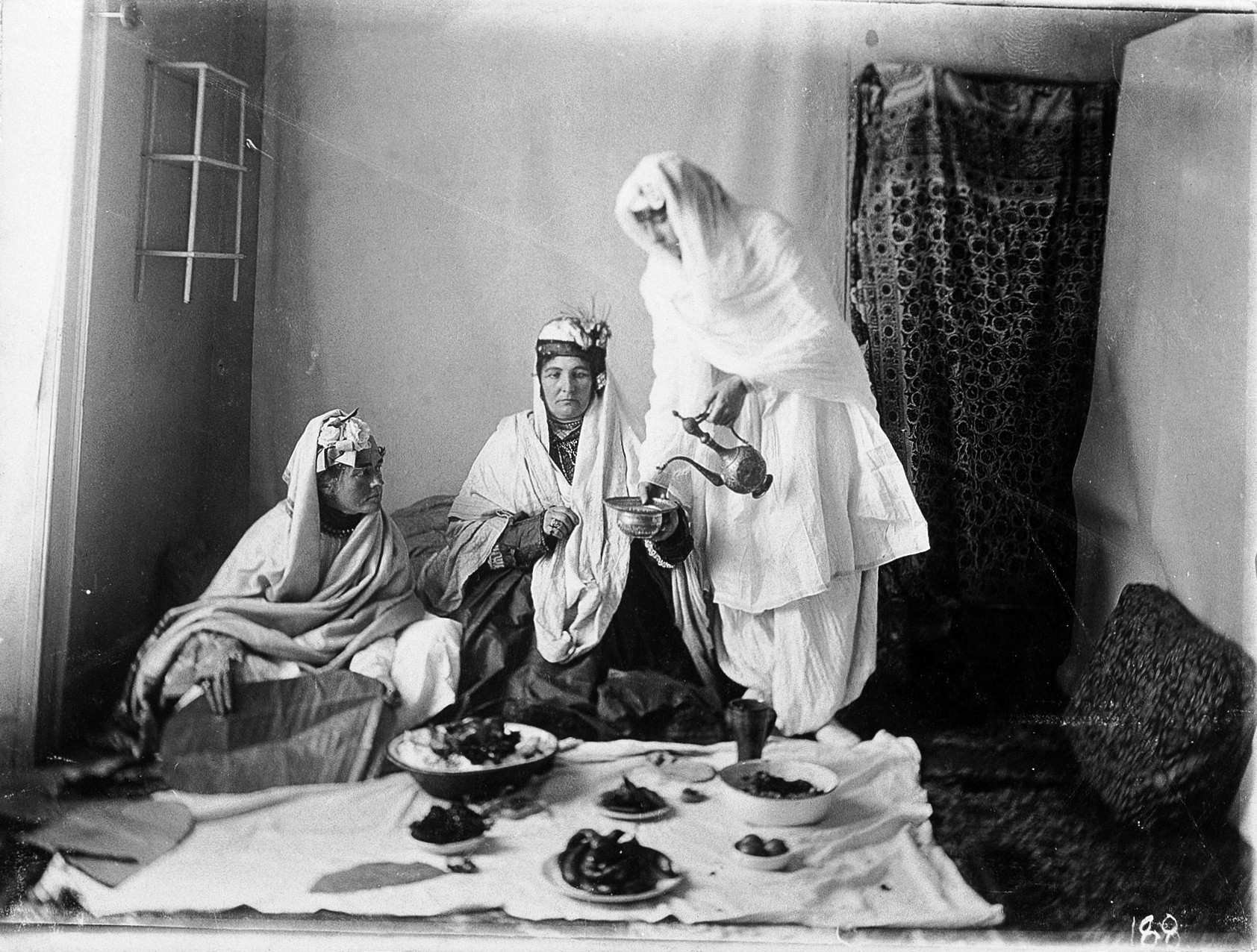
Ladies of the royal harem enjoying an Afghan meal.

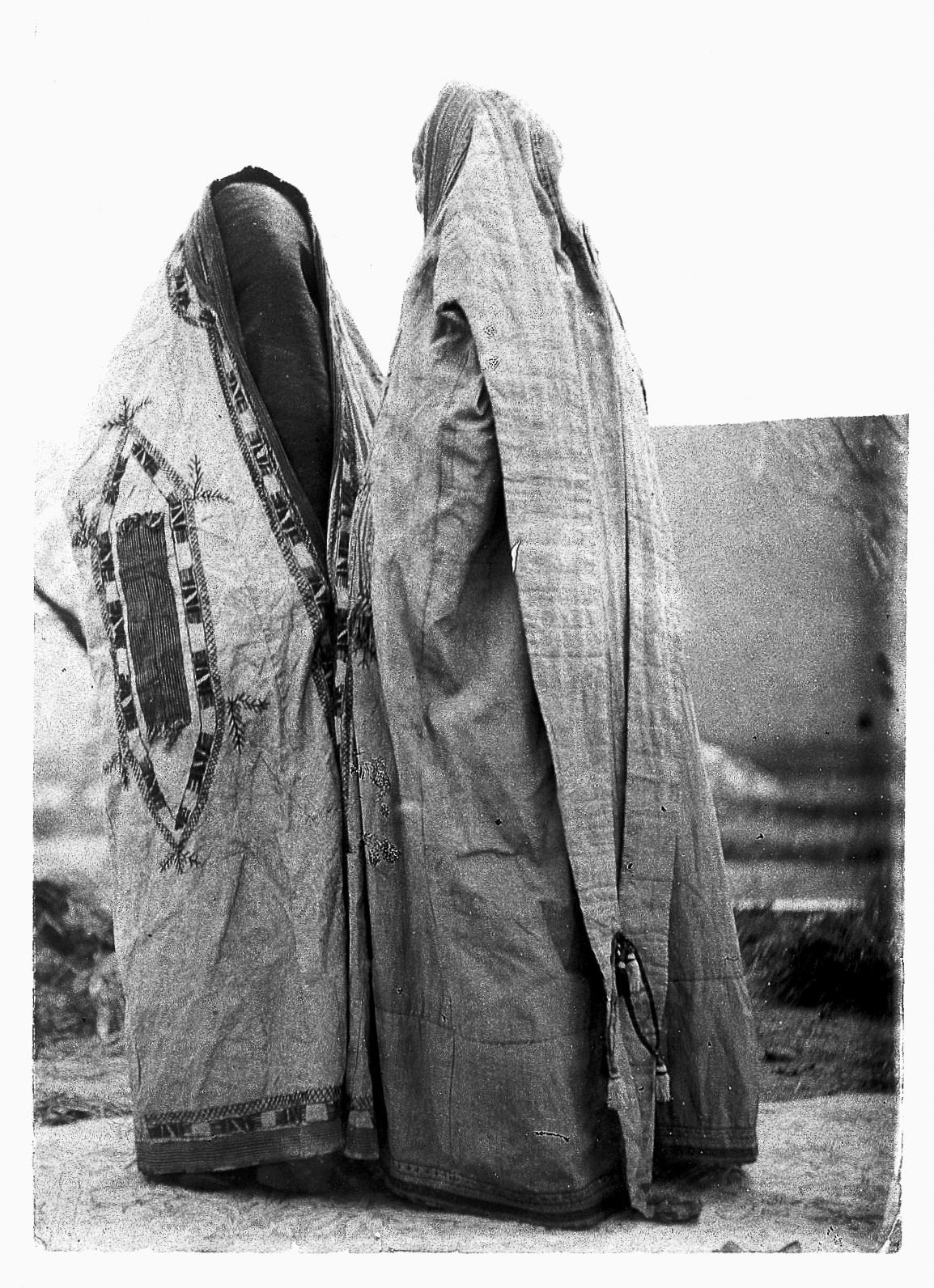
Afghan ladies in their Purdah dress (Chador).

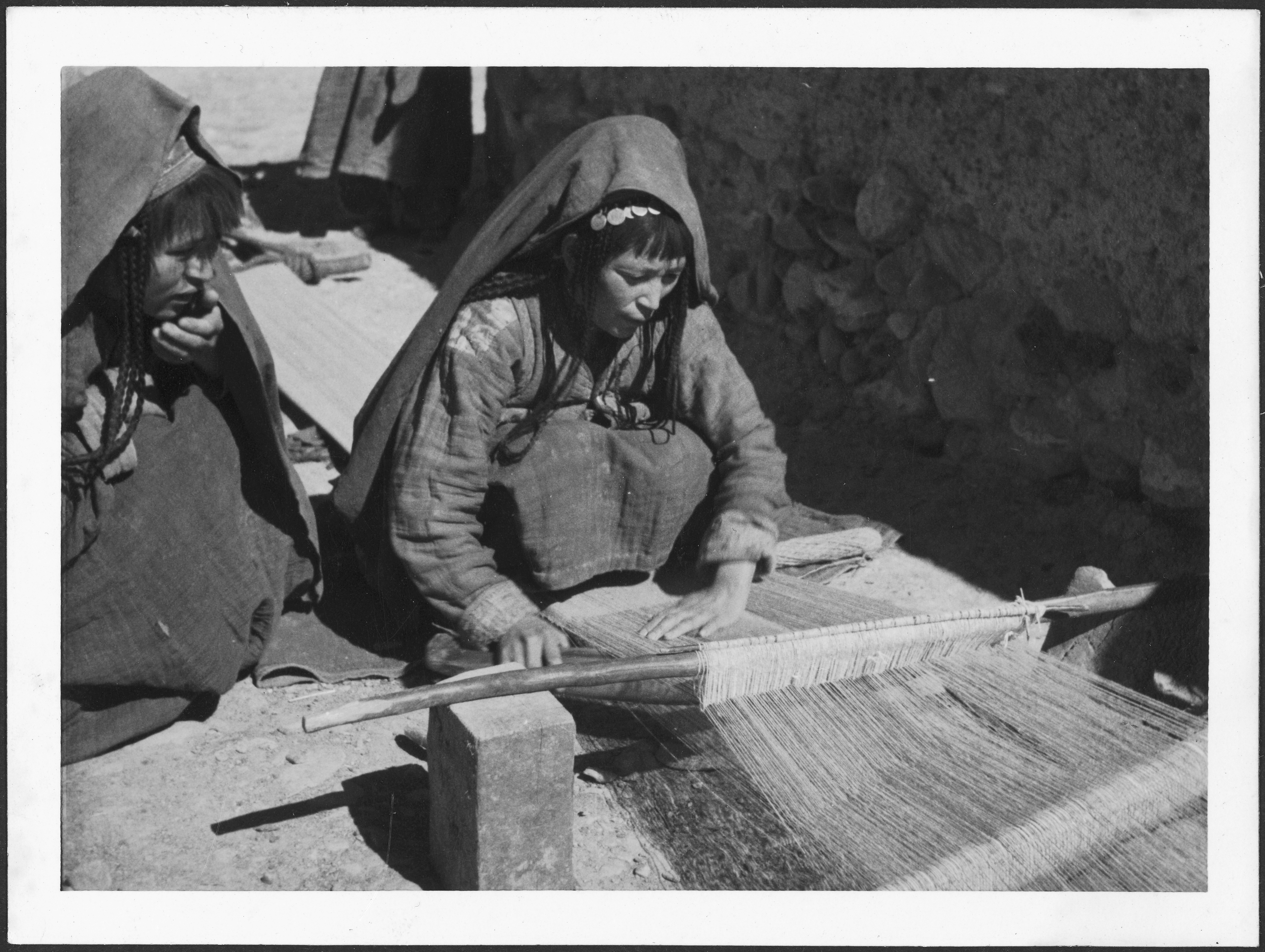
Turkmen women weaving on a loom in Afghanistan, c. 1939; women have traditionally performed weaving work in the country.

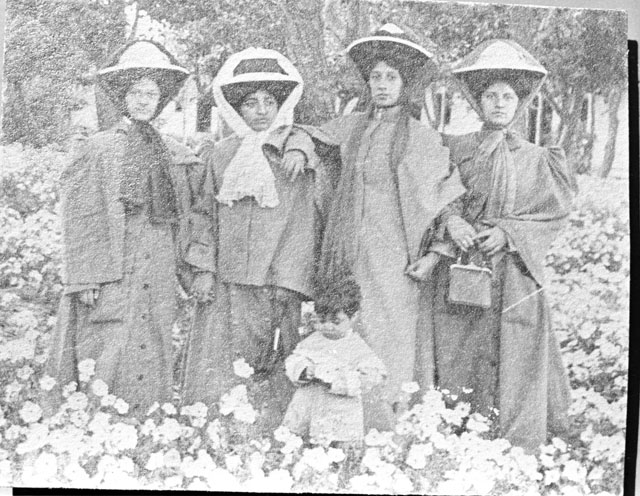
Afghan women in 1920s

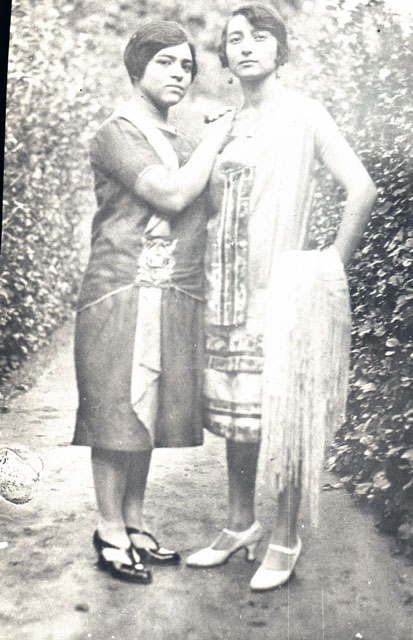
Women of Afghanistan-1920s

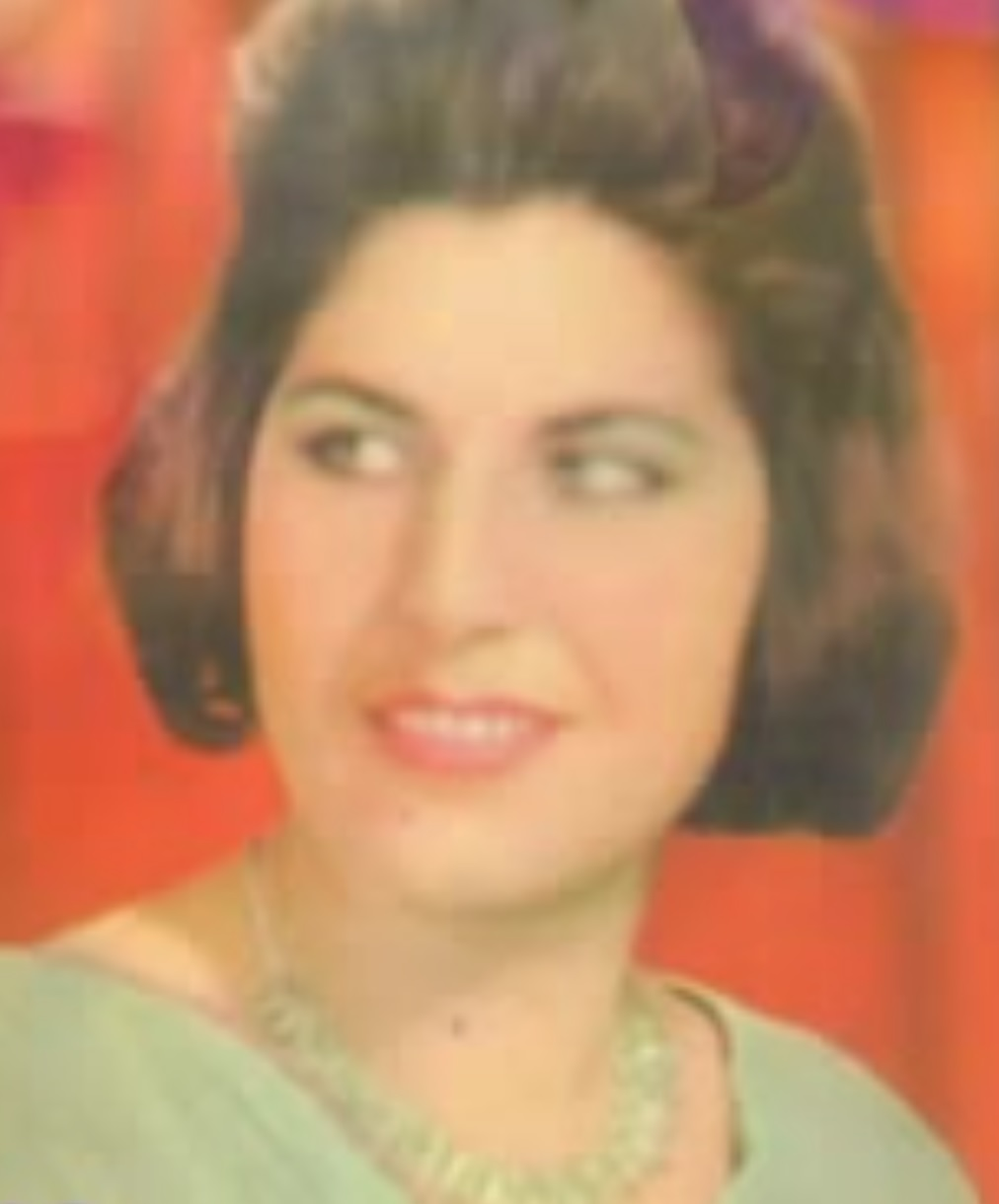
Rukhshana in the 1960s, uncredited.

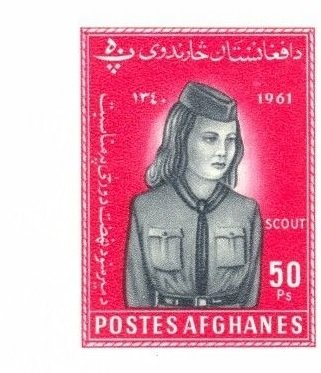
Postage stamp of Afghanistan showing a girl scout (1961)

Tribal Afghan women in traditional attire, 1975

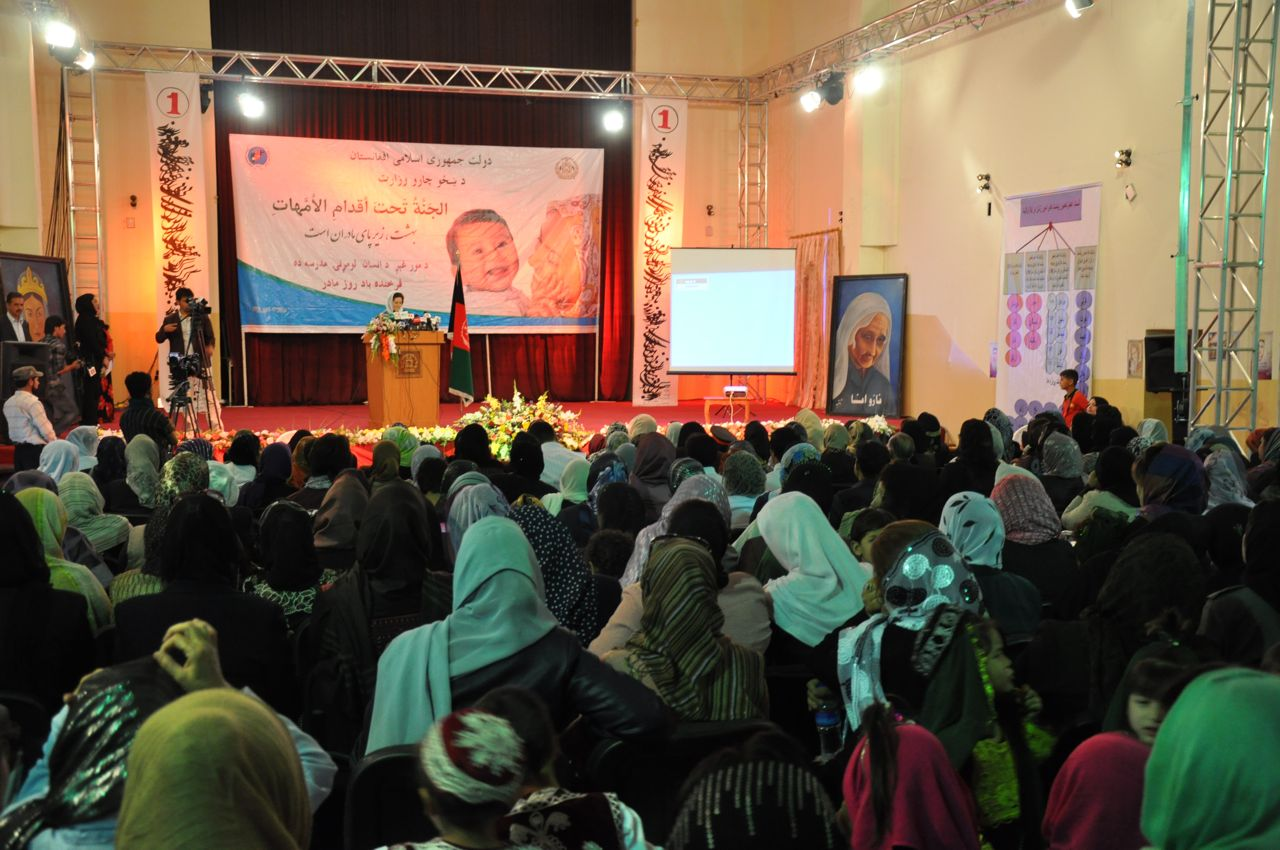
Mother's Day event in Afghanistan

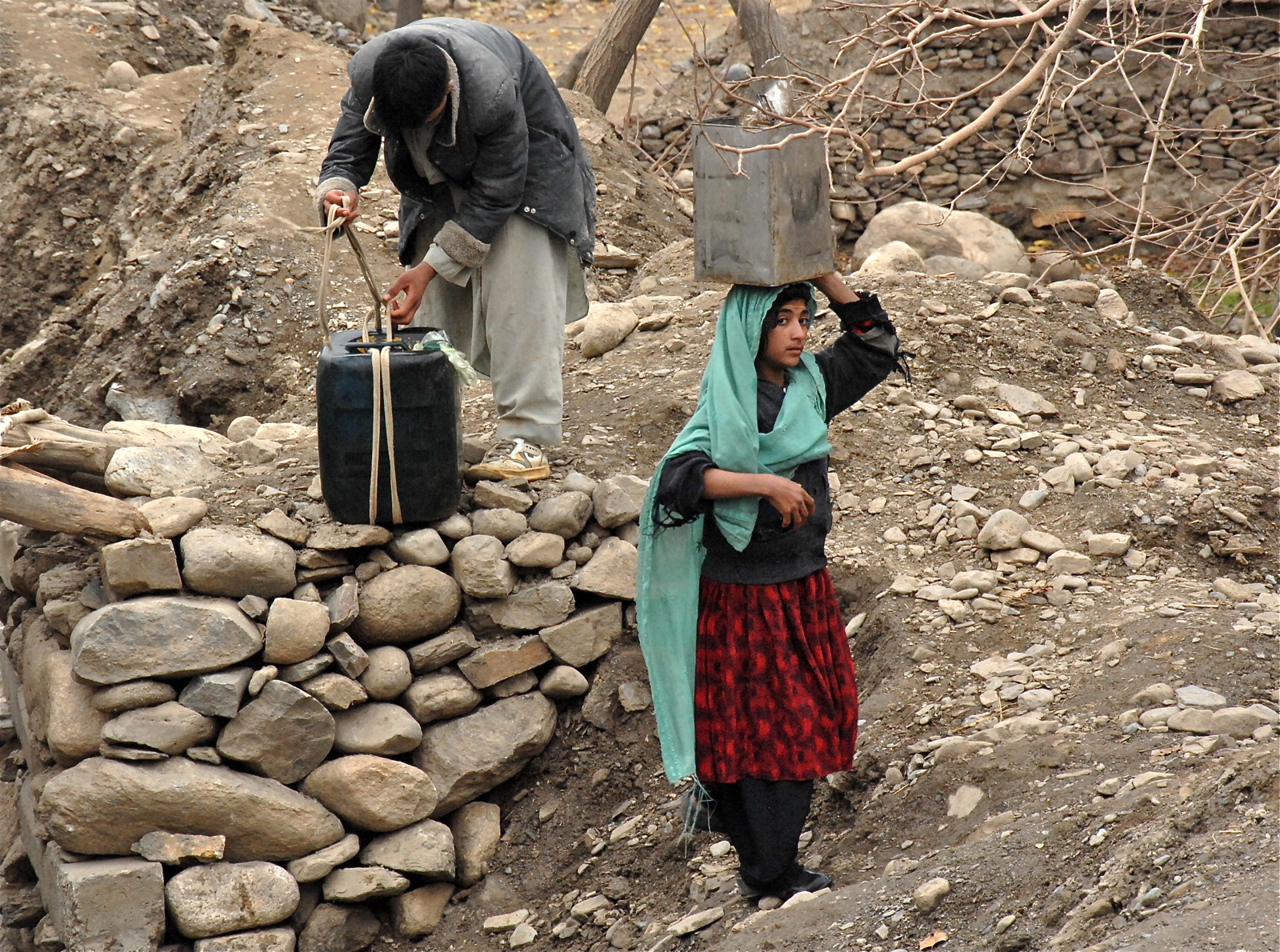
A young woman drawing water

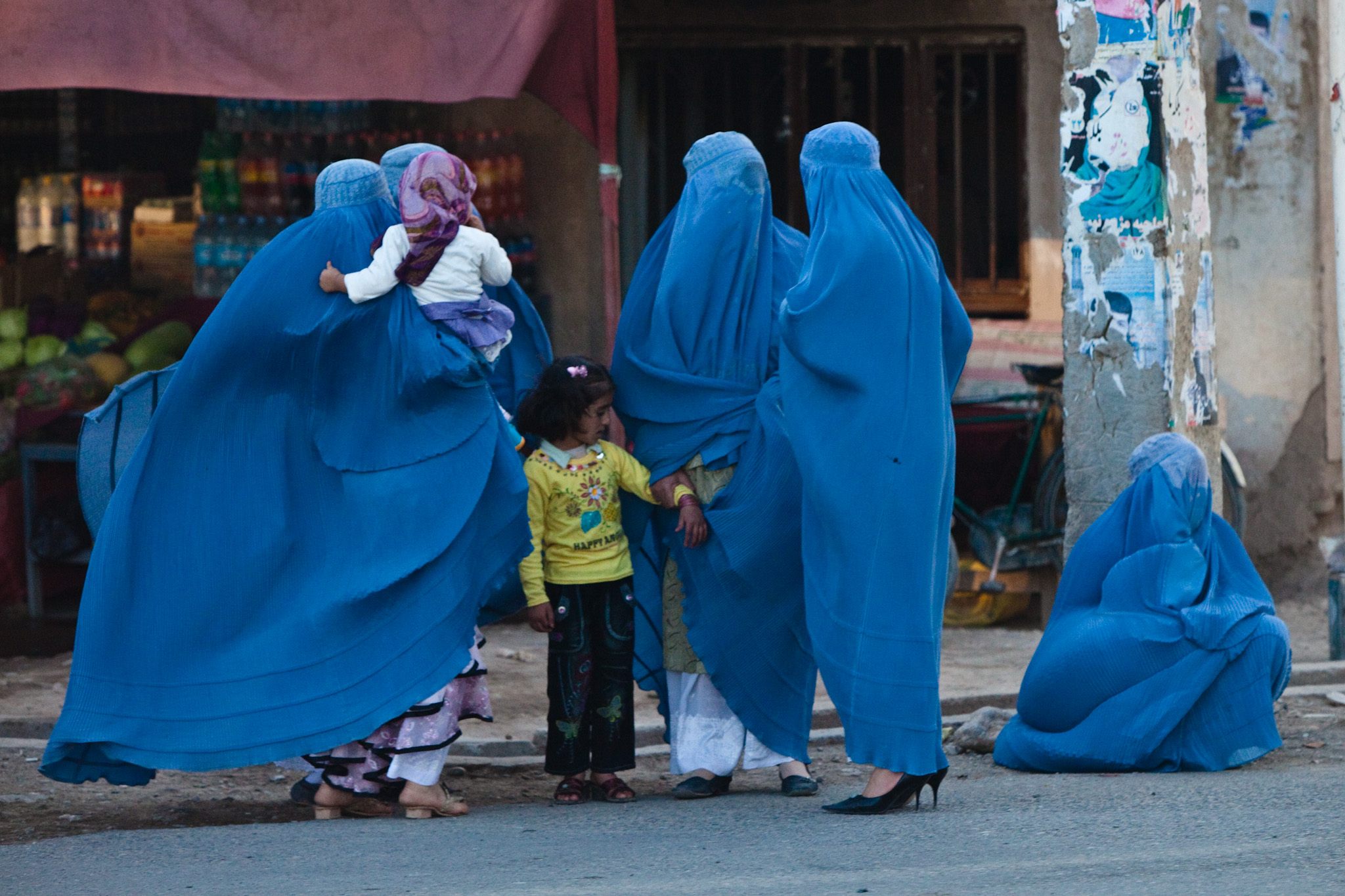
A group of burqa-wearing women in Herat

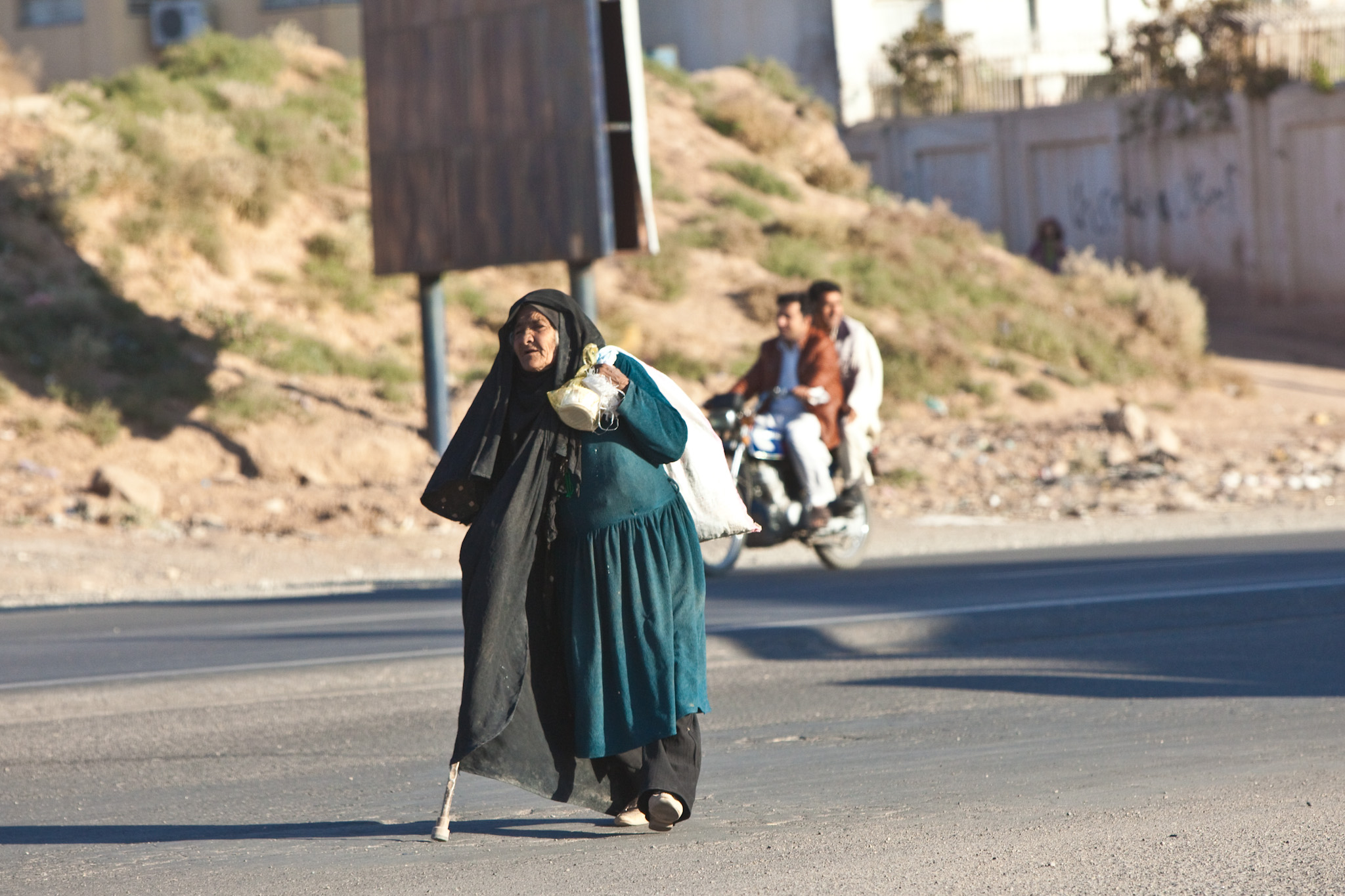
Old woman in Herat

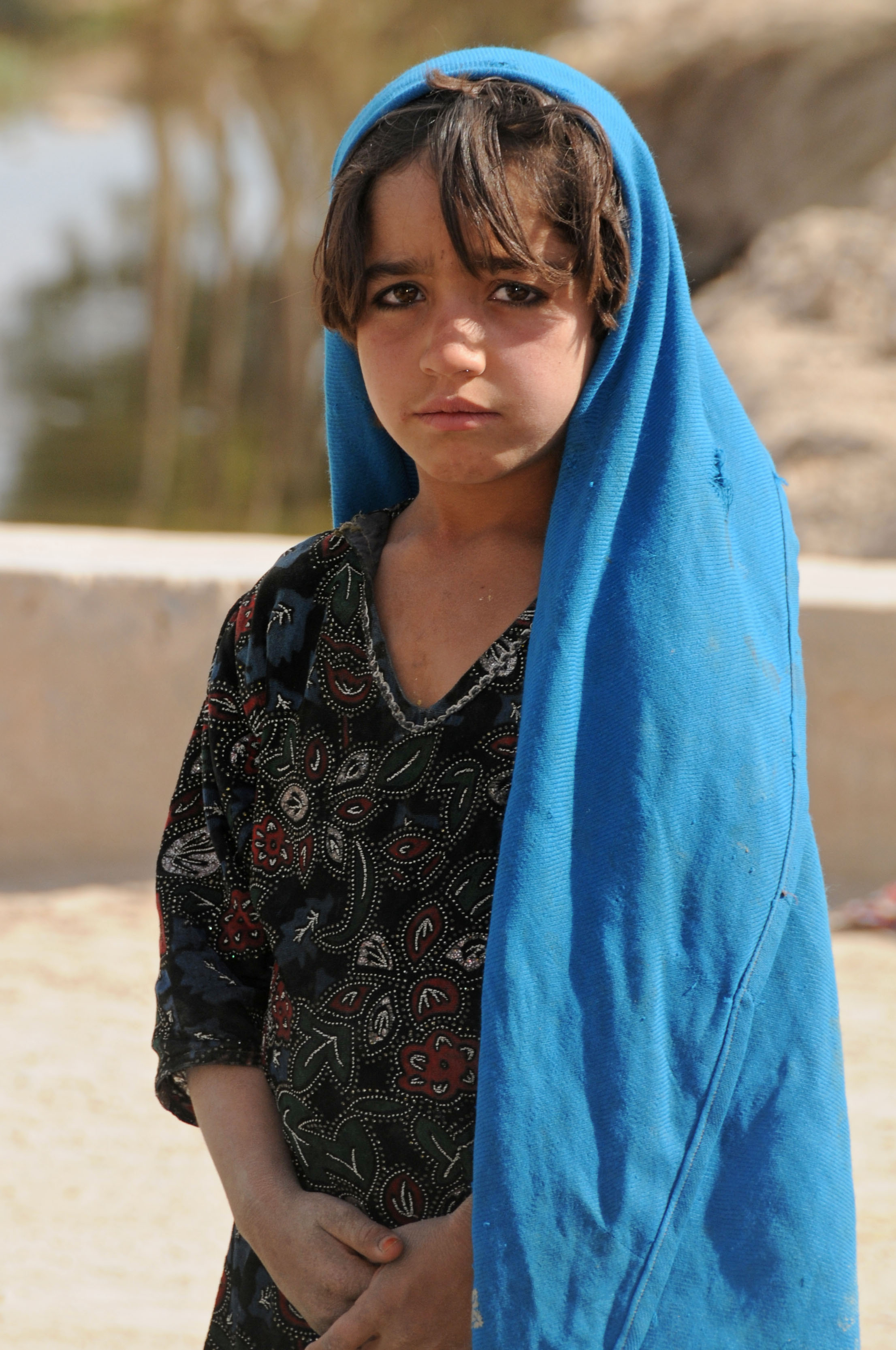
An Afghan girl in Oruzgan Province

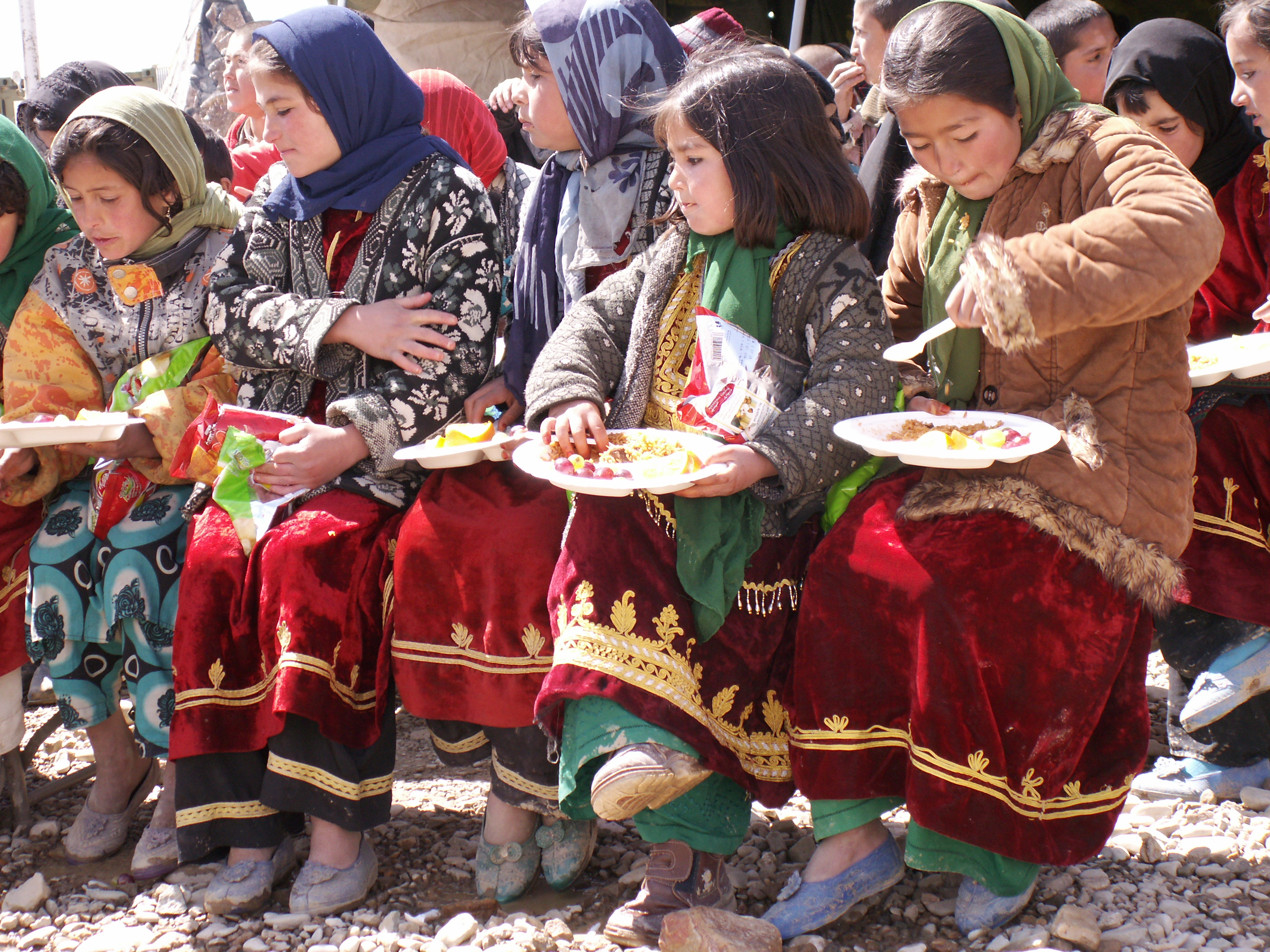
Girls enjoying a meal in Chaghcharan on Orphanage Day

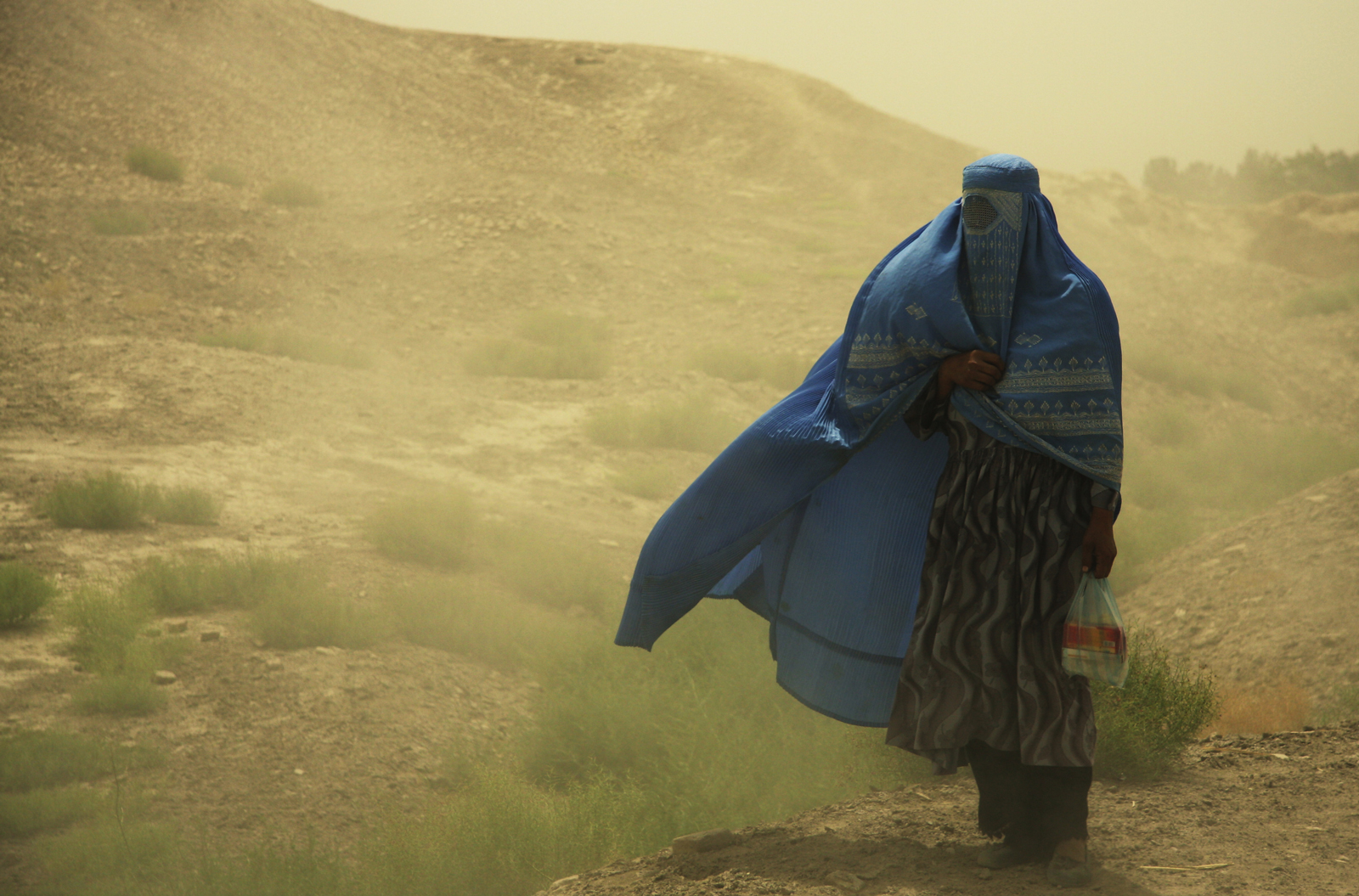
A woman wearing a Burqa near Balkh

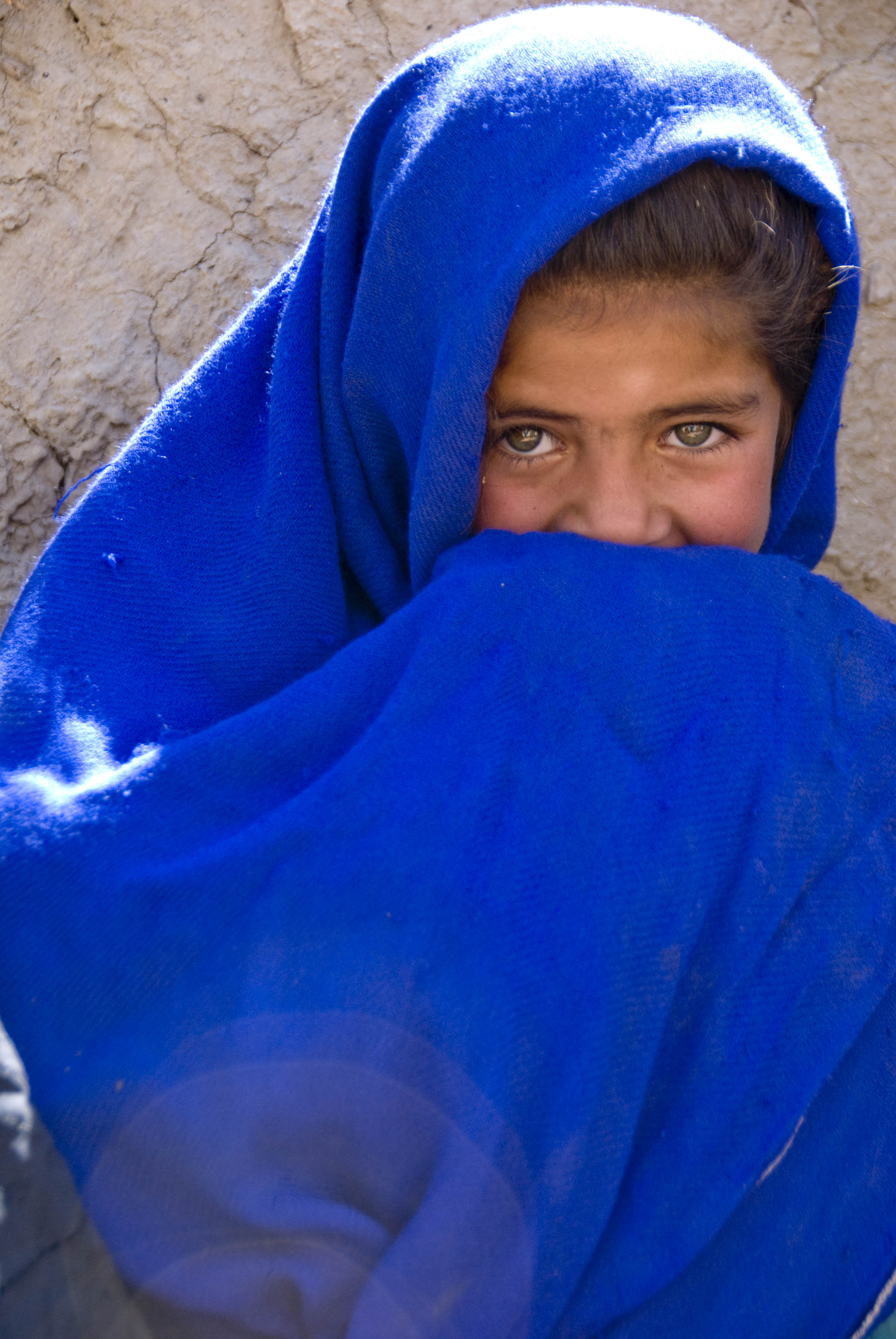
A girl from Kandahar Province

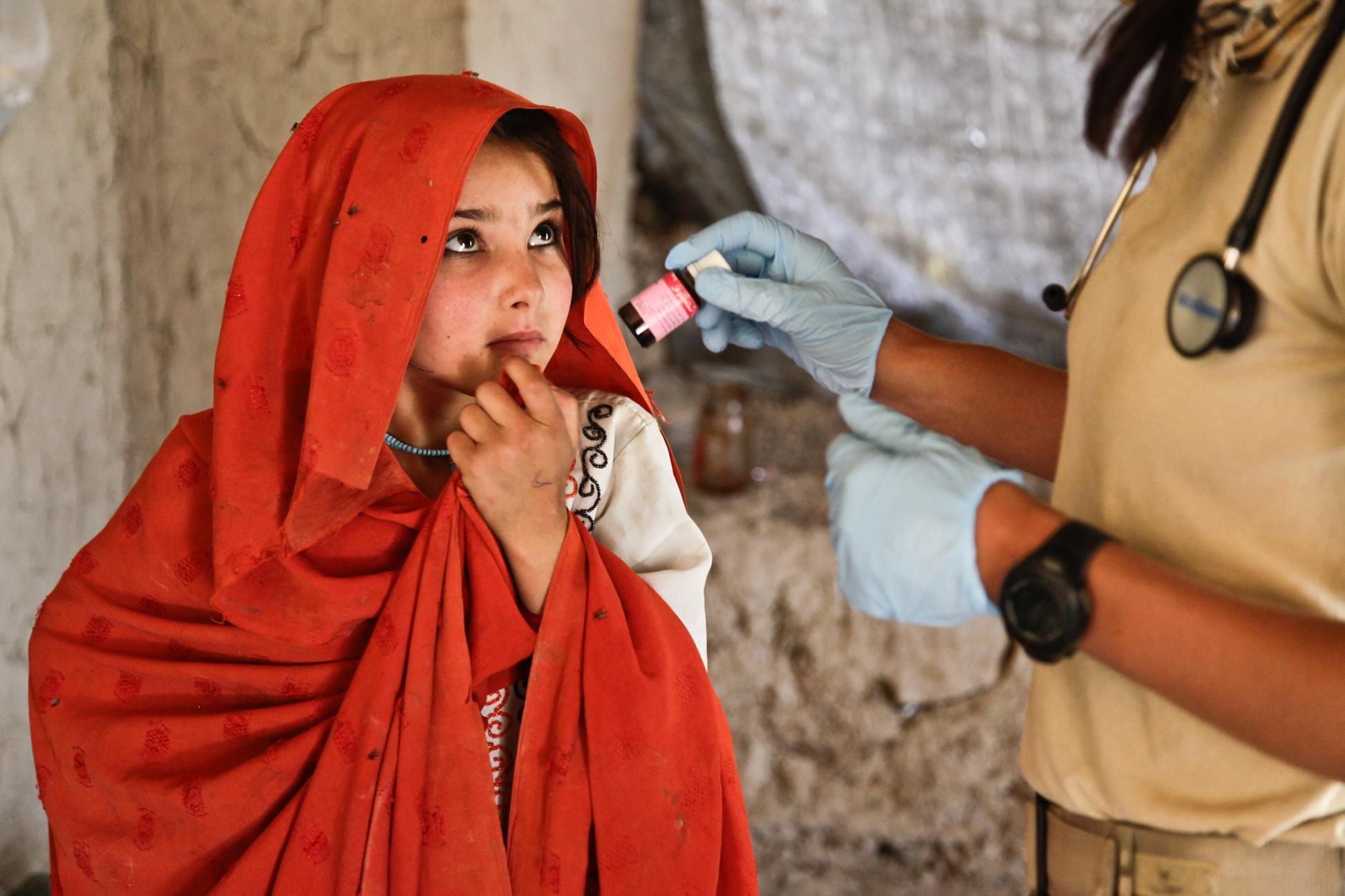
An Afghan girl receiving treatment from an American medic in Oruzgan Province

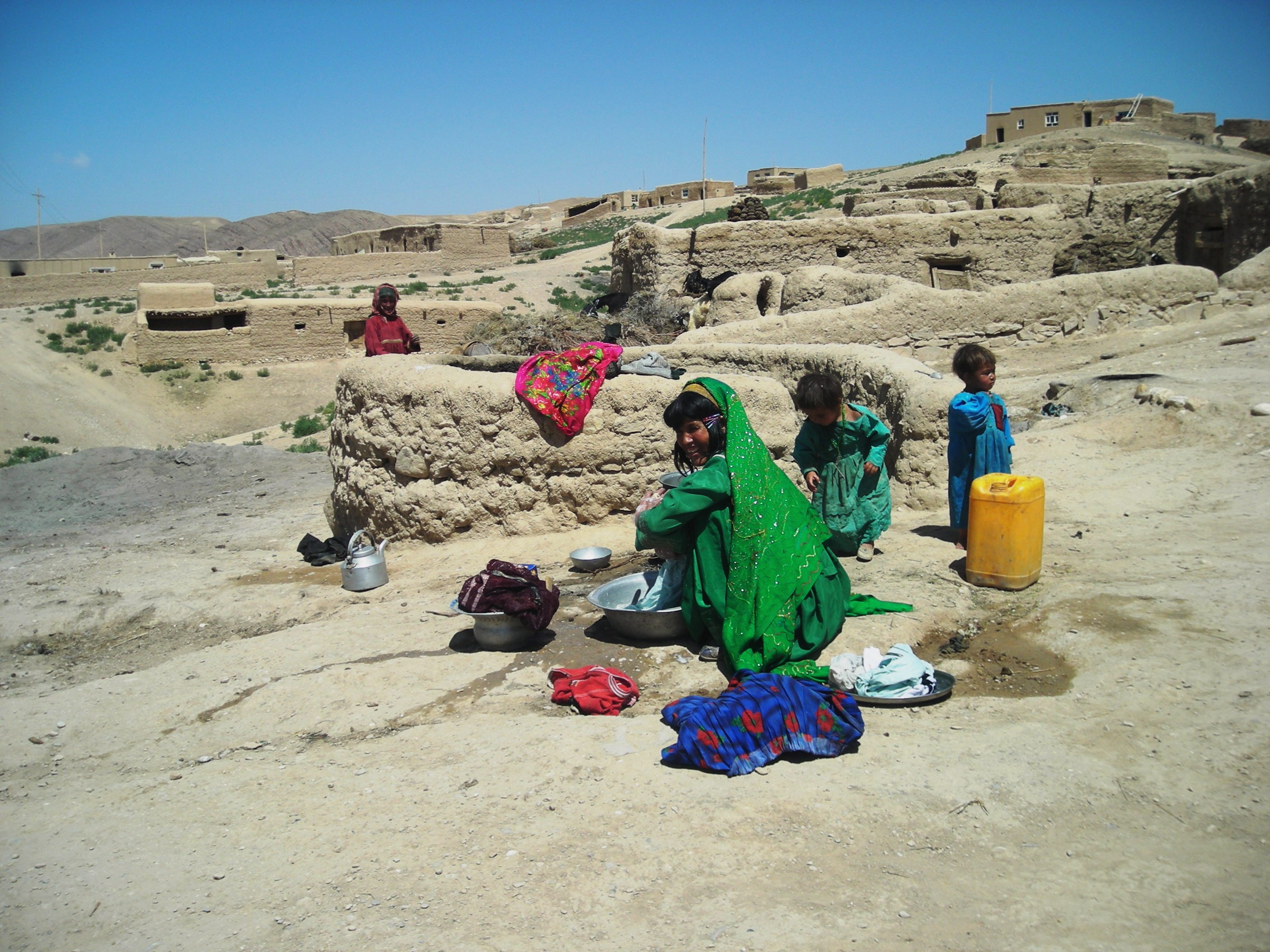
A mother with her children in a village near Charghcharan

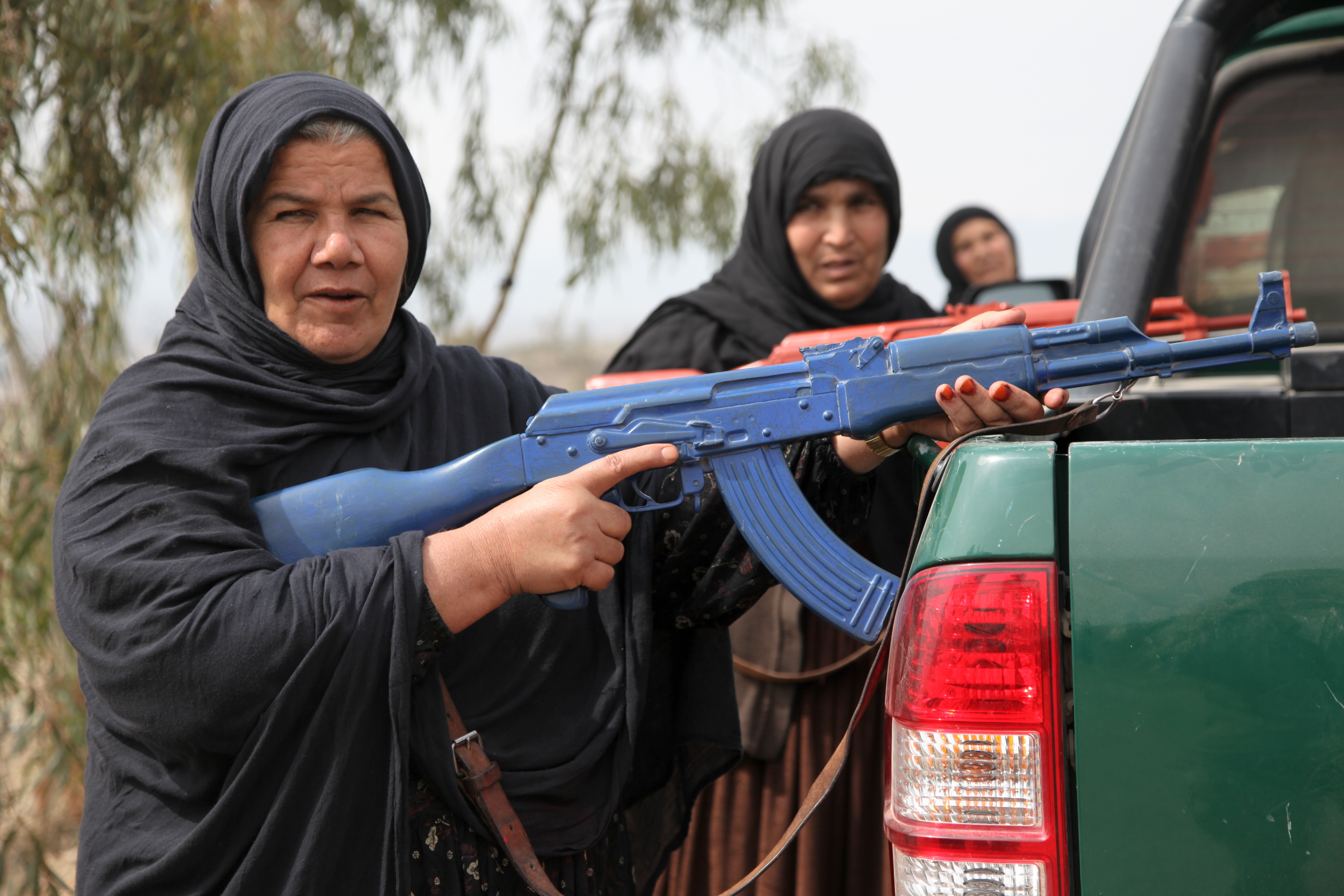
Female police officers in training, Khost Province, 2013

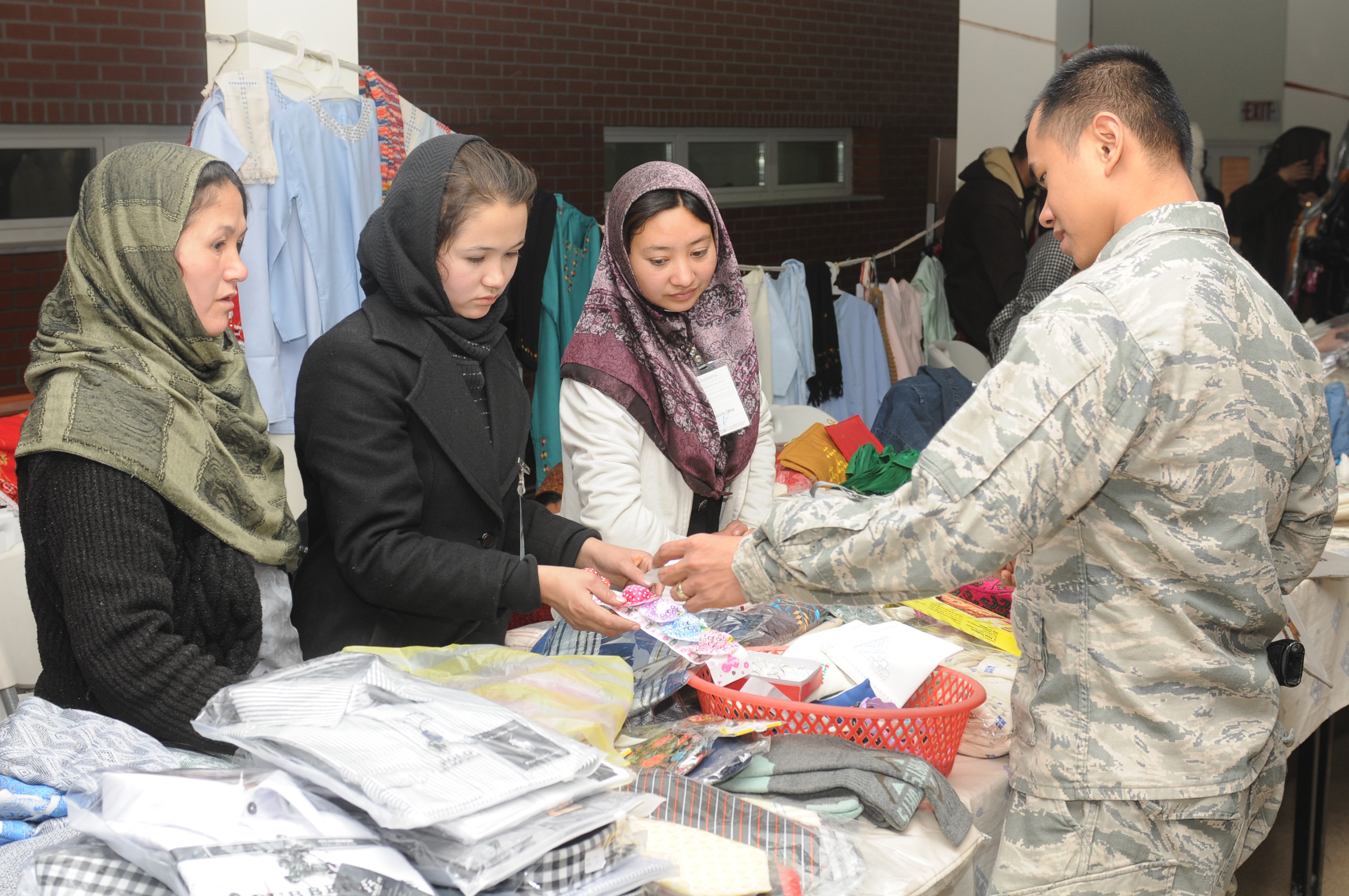
Female vendors at a small bazaar selling items to U.S. Air Force personnel, 2010

== See also ==
- Access for Afghan Women Act
- Prostitution in Afghanistan
- Women in agriculture in Afghanistan
- Women in the Parliament of Afghanistan
- Humira Saqib

Organisations:

- Women for Afghan Women
- Revolutionary Association of the Women of Afghanistan
- Afghan Women's Network
- Afghan Women's Council
- Afghan Women's Business Federation
- Afghanistan women's national football team
- Afghanistan national women's cricket team
- Rukhshana Media

General:

- Femicide
- Gender apartheid
- Gendercide
- Human rights in Afghanistan
- Human rights in Muslim-majority countries
- Human rights in the Quran
- Women and religion
- Women in the Arab world
- Women in Asia
- Women in Islam
