= List of the first women holders of political offices in Asia =

This is a list of political offices which have been held by a woman, with details of the first woman holder of each office. It is ordered by the countries in Asia and by dates of appointment. Please observe that this list is meant to contain only the first woman to hold of a political office, and not all the female holders of that office.

== Afghanistan ==
- Member of Parliament – Kubra Noorzai, Aziza Amani, Naiba from Khulm and Najiba from Herat – 1964
- Senator – Roqia Abubakr, Khadija Ahrari, Masuma Esmati-Wardak, Anahita Ratebzad, Aziza Gardizi and Homeira Seljuqi – 1965
- Minister (Health minister) – Kubra Noorzai – 1965
- Director of the Foreign and Publication Department – Maliha Zafar – 1967
- Minister without Portfolio – Shafriqua Siayel – 1971
- Advisor for the Ministry of Planning – Shafriqua Siayel – 1972
- Minister of state for Women's Affairs – Shafriqua Siayel – 1976

=== Democratic Republic of Afghanistan ===
- Ambassador (to Yugoslavia) – Anahita Ratebzad – 1978
- Minister of Social Affairs – Anahita Ratebzad – 1978
- Minister of Education – Anahita Ratebzad – 1979
- Deputy Chairman of the Presidium of the Revolutionary Council (Vice President) – Anahita Ratebzad – 1980

=== Islamic Republic of Afghanistan ===
- Deputy Premier Minister – Sima Samar – 2001
- Minister of Youth Affairs – Amina Afzali – 2004
- Governor – Habiba Sorabi – 2005
- Mayor – Azra Jafari, (Nili) – 2008
- Afghanistan's Permanent Representative to the United Nations – Adela Raz – 2018
- Chairwoman of Election Commission – Hawa Alam Nooristani – 2019
- Chairwoman of IECC – Zuhra Bayan Shinwari –

== Azerbaijan ==
=== Soviet Socialist Republic ===
- Cabinet Minister – Ayna Sultanova – 1938
- Minister of Justice – Ayna Sultanova – 1938
- Chairperson of the Committee for Science and Technology at the Council of Ministers – Tahira Tahirova – 1957
- Minister of Education – Sakina Aliyeva – 1958
- Minister of Foreign Affairs – Tahira Tahirova – 1959
- Deputy Premier Minister – Tahira Tahirova – 1963
- Vice-president – S.M. Mamedaliyeva – 1963
- Minister of Higher and Special Education – Zuleikha Ismail-Kyzy Guseinova – 1965
- Minister Social Affairs – L.P. Lykova – 1965
- Head of the Central Committee Department of Agriculture – L.D. Radzhabova – 1971
- Minister of Public Service/Consumers Protection - Zuleikha Mageran Kyzy Gasanova – 1974
- Minister of Trade – Svetlana Chingvitz-Kyzy Kasimova – 1979
- Minister of Foreign Affairs – Elmira Gafarova – 1983
- Chairwoman of the Presidium of the Supreme Soviet – Elmira Gafarova – 1989
- Speaker of the National Assembly of Azerbaijan – Elmira Gafarova – 1990

=== Republic ===
- Chairwoman of the National Assembly – Elmira Gafarova – 1991
- Secretary of State – Lala Shevket – 1993
- Minister of Justice – Südaba Hasanova -1995
- Vice President of Azerbaijan – Mehriban Aliyeva – 2017

== Bahrain ==
- Member of the Council of Representatives – Lateefa Al Gaood – 2006 (first female MP in the Gulf region)

== Bangladesh ==
- Minister of State for Health and Social Welfare – Nurjahan Murshed – 1972
- Minister of Social Affairs and Family Planning – Nurjahan Murshed – 1973
- Minister of Education – Badrunnessa Ahmed – 1973
- Minister of Land Administration and Land Reforms – Benita Roy – 1975
- Minister of Women's Affairs – Aminah Rahman – 1978
- Prime Minister – Khaleda Zia – 1991
- Minister of Agriculture – Matia Chowdhury – 2009
- Minister of Home Affairs – Sahara Khatun – 2009
- Minister of Foreign Affairs – Dipu Moni – 2009
- Speaker of the Parliament – Shirin Sharmin Chaudhury – 2013
- Minister of State for Public Administration – Ismat Ara Sadek – 2014
- Minister of State of Women and Children Affairs – Meher Afroz Chumki – 2014

== Bhutan ==
- Regent – Ashi Kesang – 1972
- King's Representative in the Ministry of Finance – Ashi Sonam Chhoden Wangchuck – 1974
- Special Advisor in the Ministry of Finance – Ashi Sonam Chhoden Wangchuck – 1996
- Chair of Council of Ministers – Ashi Sonam Chhoden Wangchuck – 1998
- Minister of Works and Human Settlement – Aum Dorji Choden – 2013

== Cambodia ==
- Member of Parliament – Tong Siv Eng – 1958
- Secretary of State for Labour – Tong Siv Eng – 1959
- Minister of Social Action – Tong Siv Eng – 1961
- Minister of Health – Tong Siv Eng – 1963
- Secretary of State for National Education – Diep Dinar – 1966
- Secretary of State for Information – Chine Renne – 1969
- Secretary of State for Tourism – Ung Mung – 1969
- Cambodian Deputy Permanent Representative to the United Nations – Nhoung Peng – 1970
- Under-Secretary of State for Finances – Pheng Santhan – 1972
- Under-Secretary of State for Labour and Social Welfare – Plech Phirun – 1972
- Minister of Education – Ieng Thirith – 1975
- Minister of Culture and Education – Yun Yat – 1976
- Provincial Governor – Mithuna Phuthong – 2017

== China ==
=== Early Imperial China ===
- Regent (Empress Regent of China) – Lü Zhi – 202 BC

=== Mid-Imperial China ===
- Monarch (Empress Regnant of China) - Wu Zetian – 690 AD

=== Republic of China (1912–1949) ===
- Minister for Women's Affairs – He Xiangning – 1923
- Member of Government Council – Song Qingling – 1927
- Member of the Central Government Council – He Xianging – 1928
- Acting Head of the Guangzhou government – Chen Bijun – 1944
- Member of the National Council of the Nationalist Government – Wu Yifang – 1947

=== People's Republic of China ===
==== National level ====
- Cabinet minister – Minister of Textile Industry – Feng Yunhe – 1949
- Vice Chairperson (Vice President) – Soong Chingling – 1959
- Chairperson (Co-acting president) – Soong Ching-ling – 1968
- Member of the Politburo – Jiang Qing – 1969
- Vice Premier – Wu Guixian – 1975
- Honorary President (Head of State) – Soong Ching-ling – 1981
- Governor (of Jiangsu) – Gu Xiulian – 1983

===== Individual ministries or offices =====
- Minister of Health – Li Dequan – 1949
- Justice Minister – Shi Liang – 1949–1959
- Vice Chairperson of the Central People's Government – Soong Chingling – 1949
- Vice Chairperson of the Chinese People's Political Consultative Conference – Soong Chingling – 1954
- Minister of People's Supervision – Qian Ying – 1954
- Minister of Interior – Qian Ying – 1959
- Vice Chairperson of the Standing Committee of the National People's Congress – Soong Ching-ling – 1959
- State Councillor – Chen Muhua – 1982
- Auditor General (National Audit Office) – Hu Zejun – 2017

=== Republic of China (Taiwan) ===
- Minister and Commissioner for Oversea Chinese – He Xiangning – 1949
- Deputy Chairperson of Economic Planning Council – Shirley Kuo Wang-jung – 1973
- Minister of Finance – Shirley Kuo Wang-jung – 1988
- Minister of State and Chairperson of Council of Economic Development – Shirley Kuo Wang-jung – 1990
- Minister of Transport and Communication – Yeh Chu-lan – 2000
- Vice President of the Republic of China – Annette Lu – 2000–2008
- President of the Republic of China – Tsai Ing-wen – 2016

== East Timor ==
- Minister of Justice – Ana Maria Pessoa Pereira da Silva Pinto – 2001
- Minister of Finance – Emilia Maria Valéria Pires – 2007
- Foreign minister (acting) – Adalgisa Magno Guterres – 2007

== Hong Kong ==
British Hong Kong

- Deputy Secretary for Government – Anson Chan – 1975
- Director of Social Services – Anson Chan – 1980
- Commissioner for Culture – Elizabeth Chi-lieh Wong-Chien – 1982
- Secretary of Economy – Anson Chan – 1987
- Chief Secretary – Anson Chan – 1993

Hong Kong Special Administrative Region

- President of the Legislative Council – Rita Fan – 1997
- Secretary for Justice – Elsie Leung – 1997
- Chief Secretary – Anson Chan – 1997
- Chief Executive – Carrie Lam – 2017

== India ==
=== British Raj ===
- Leader of a Major Party – Dr. Annie Besant – 1917
- Member of Provincial Legislative Assembly – Dr. Muthulakshmi Reddi – 1921
- Member of Central Legislature – Radhabai Subbarayan – 1937
- Provincial Minister – Vijaya Lakshmi Pandit – 1938
- Member of National Defence Council – Begum Jahanara Shahnawaz – 1942

=== Dominion and Republic of India ===
==== National level ====
- Cabinet minister – Minister of Health – Rajkumari Amrit Kaur – 1947
- Prime Minister – Indira Gandhi – 1966
- Leader of the House in Lok Sabha (Lower House of the Parliament) – Indira Gandhi – 1967
- Leader of the Opposition in Lok Sabha (Lower House of the Parliament) – Sonia Gandhi – 1999
- President – Pratibha Patil – 2007
- Speaker of the Lok Sabha (Lower House of the Parliament) – Meira Kumar – 2009
- Tribal President and First President to be born after independence – Droupadi Murmu – 2022
- Governor – United Provinces - Sarojini Naidu – 1947

===== Individual ministries =====
- Minister of Communications – Rajkumari Amrit Kaur – 1951
- Minister of State For Home Affairs – Maragatham Chandrasekar – 1962
- Minister of Information and Broadcasting – Indira Gandhi – 1964
- Minister of State of External Affairs – Lakshmi N. Menon – 1966
- Minister of External Affairs – Indira Gandhi – 1967
- Minister of Finance – Indira Gandhi – 1970
- Minister of Home Affairs – Indira Gandhi – 1970
- Minister of Defence – Indira Gandhi – 1975
- Chief Election Commissioner of India – V. S. Ramadevi – 1990
- Minister of Railways – Mamata Banerjee – 1999
- Ministry of Women and Child Development – Mamata Banerjee – 2006
- Ministry of Minority Affairs – Najma Heptullah – 2014

==== Regions ====
===== Andhra Pradesh =====
- Governor of United Andhra Pradesh – Sharada Mukherjee – 1977
- Home Minister of United Andhra Pradesh – Sabita Indra Reddy – 2009
- Home Minister of Andhra Pradesh - Mekathoti Sucharita – 2019

===== Assam =====
- Chief Minister – Anwara Taimur – 1980

===== Bihar =====
- Chief Minister – Rabri Devi – 1997

===== Delhi =====
- Chief Minister – Sushma Swaraj – 1998
- Mayor – Aruna Asaf Ali – 1958

===== Goa =====
- Chief Minister – Shashikala Kakodkar (1973–79)

===== Gujarat =====
- Chief Minister – Anandiben Patel – 2014
- Governor – Sharada Mukherjee – 1978

===== Himachal Pradesh =====
- Governor – Sheila Kaul – 1995

===== Karnataka =====
- Governor – V.S. Ramadevi – 1999

===== Kerala =====
- Governor – Jothi Venkatachalam – 1977

===== Madhya Pradesh =====
- Chief Minister – Uma Bharati – 2003

===== Maharashtra =====
- Governor – Vijaya Lakshmi Pandit – 1963

===== Odisha =====
- Chief Minister – Nandini Satpathy – 1972

===== Punjab =====
- Chief Minister – Rajinder Kaur Bhattal – 1996

===== Rajasthan =====
- Governor – Pratibha Patil – 2004
- Chief Minister – Vasundhara Raje – 2003

===== Tamil Nadu =====
- Governor – Fathima Beevi – 1997
- Chief Minister – V. N. Janaki – 1989

===== Uttarakhand =====
- Governor – Margaret Alva – 2009

===== Uttar Pradesh =====
- Governor – Sarojini Naidu – 1947
- Chief Minister – Sucheta Kripalani – 1963

===== West Bengal =====
- Governor – Padmaja Naidu – 1956
- Chief Minister – Mamata Banerjee – 2011

== Indonesia ==
=== Ancient Indonesia ===
- Queen regnant of Kalingga – Shima – c. 674
- Queen regnant of Medang – Isyana – c. 947
- Queen regnant of Bali – Mahendradatta – c. 980
- Queen regnant of Majapahit – Tribhuwana Wijaya – 1328
- Queen regnant of Bone – We Banrigau Makkaleppie Daeng Marowa - 1496
- Queen regnant of Kalinyamat – Ratu Kalinyamat – 1549
- Sultanah of Aceh – Taj ul-Alam – 1641

=== Dutch East Indies ===
- Member of Volksraad – Cornelia Razoux Schultz-Metzer – 1935

=== East Indonesia ===
- Mayor of Makassar – Salawati Daud – 1949

=== National level ===
- Deputy Speaker of the People's Representative Council/People's Consultative Assembly – Fatimah Achmad – 1997
- Cabinet minister – Minister of Social Service – Maria Ulfah Santoso – 1946
- Vice President – Megawati Sukarnoputri – 1999
- President – Megawati Sukarnoputri – 2001
- Governor – Ratu Atut Chosiyah – 2005
- Mayor – Tri Rismaharini – 2010 (First female mayor of Surabaya who was elected directly after the 1998 reformation)
- Speaker of the People's Representative Council – Puan Maharani – 2019
- Audit Board of Indonesia (chairperson) – Isma Yatun – 2022

=== Individual ministries ===
- Minister of Manpower – Soerastri Karma Trimurti – 1947
- Minister of Basic Education and Culture – Artati Marzuki-Sudirdjo – 1964
- Minister of Agriculture – Justika Sjarifuddin Baharsjah – 1998
- Minister of Trade – Rini Soemarno – 2001
- Minister of Health – Siti Fadilah Supari – 2004
- Finance Minister – Sri Mulyani Indrawati – 2005
- Minister of Tourism – Mari Elka Pangestu – 2011 (The ministry fell under the name 'Ministry of Tourism and Creative Economy')
- Coordinating Minister for Human Development and Cultural Affairs – Puan Maharani – 2014 (First Indonesian female to ever hold 'Coordinating Minister' post.)
- Foreign Minister – Retno Marsudi – 2014
- Minister of Environment and Forestry – Siti Nurbaya Bakar – 2014
- Minister of Maritime Affairs and Fisheries – Susi Pudjiastuti – 2014

== Iran ==
=== Sasanian Empire ===
- Monarch of Persia – Purandokht – 630

=== Imperial State ===
- Member of the Parliament – Mehrangiz Dowlatshahi, Nayereh Ebtehaj-Samii, Showkat Malek Jahanbani, Nezhat Nafisi, Farrokhroo Parsa and Hajar Tarbiat – 1963
- Senator – Mehrangiz Manouchehrian and Shams ol-Moluk Mosahab – 1963
- Deputy Minister of Education – Farrokhroo Parsa – 1965
- Minister of Education – Farrokhroo Parsa – 1968
- Mayor (Ahvaz) – Dabir Azam Hosna – 1970
- Minister for Women's Affairs – Mahnaz Afkhami – 1976

=== Islamic Republic ===
- Advisor to President – Shahla Habibi – 1995
- Vice President – Massoumeh Ebtekar – 1997
- Head of Environmental Protection Organization – Massoumeh Ebtekar – 1997
- Member of Board of the Parliament – Soheila Jolodarzadeh – 2000
- Minister of Health – Marzieh Vahid Dastjerdi – 2009
- Vice President in Legal Affairs – Elham Aminzadeh – 2013
- Spokesperson for the Ministry of Foreign Affairs – Marzieh Afkham – 2013
- Ambassador – Marzieh Afkham – 2015

== Iraq ==
- Minister of Municipalities – Naziha al-Dulaimi – 1959 (also first female government minister in the Arab world)
- Minister of Higher Education – Suad Khalil Ismail – 1969
- Member of Parliament – Sixteen women – 1980.
- Minister of Public Works and Municipalities – Nisrin Barwari – 2003
- Minister of Labour – Leila Abdul-Latif – 2004

== Israel ==
- Minister of Labor – Golda Meir – 1949
- Minister of Foreign Affairs – Golda Meir – 1955
- Cabinet Secretary – Yael Uzai – 1963
- Prime Minister – Golda Meir – 1969
- Minister of Health – Shoshana Arbeli-Almozlino – 1986
- State Comptroller – Miriam Ben Porat – 1988
- State Attorney – Dorit Beinisch – 1989
- Minister of Education – Shulamit Aloni – 1992
- Minister of Environment – Ora Namir – 1992
- Minister of Communications – Shulamit Aloni – 1993
- Minister of Science and Culture – Shulamit Aloni – 1993
- Minister of Immigrant Absorption – Yuli Tamir – 1999
- Minister of Regional Cooperation – Tzipi Livni – 2001
- Minister of Commerce and Industry – Dalia Itzik – 2001
- Minister of Agriculture and Rural Development – Tzipi Livni – 2003
- Minister of Housing and Construction – Tzipi Livni – 2003
- Minister of Justice – Tzipi Livni – 2004
- Speaker of the Knesset – Dalia Itzik – 2006
- President (acting) – Dalia Itzik – 2007
- National Parliament – Pnina Tamano-Shata – 2013

== Japan ==
=== Ancient Japan ===
- Queen of Yamatai – Himiko – 188 AD*
- Regent – Jingū of Japan – 209 AD*
- Empress regnant – Empress Suiko – 592 AD

=== National level ===
- Member of parliament – Shidzue Katō – 1946
- Cabinet minister (Minister of Health and Welfare) – Masa Nakayama – 1960
- Minister of the Environment – Shige Ishimoto – 1984
- Chair of political party (Japan Socialist Party) – Takako Doi – 1986
- Speaker of House of Representatives – Takako Doi – 1993
- Minister of Justice – Ritsuko Nagao – 1996
- Minister for Foreign Affairs – Makiko Tanaka – 2001
- President of House of Councillors – Chikage Ogi – 2004
- Minister of Defense – Yuriko Koike – 2007
- Ministry of Internal Affairs and Communications – Sanae Takaichi – 2014
- Prime Minister – Sanae Takaichi – 2025
- Minister of Finance – Satsuki Katayama – 2025

=== Regional level ===
- Mayor of city (Ashiya city) – Harue Kitamura – 1991
- Prefectural governor (Governor of Osaka Prefecture) – Fusae Ota – 2000
- Governor of Kumamoto Prefecture – Yoshiko Shiotani – 2001
- Governor of Chiba Prefecture – Akiko Domoto – 2001
- Governor of Hokkaido Prefecture – Harumi Takahashi – 2003
- Governor of Shiga Prefecture – Yukiko Kada – 2006
- Governor of Yamagata Prefecture – Mieko Yoshimura – 2009
- Governor of Tokyo – Yuriko Koike – 2016

== Jordan ==
- Minister of Social Development – Ina'am Al-Mufti – 1980
- Minister of Culture and Information – Leila A. Sharaf – 1984
- Member of Parliament – Leila A. Sharaf – 1989
- Minister of Trade and Industry – Rima Khalaf – 1993
- Minister of Planning – Rima Khalaf – 1995
- Deputy Premier Minister – Rima Khalaf – 1999

== Kazakhstan ==
=== Kazakh Soviet Socialist Republic ===
- Vice-chairperson of the executive committee – Maryam Tugambayeva – 1932
- Acting chairperson of the executive committee – Kalima Amankulova – 1938
- Deputy premier minister – Zaure S. Omarova – 1959
- Acting chairperson of the Presidium of the Supreme Soviet – Kapitalina Nikolaevna Kryukova – 1960
- Minister of culture – Laila Galievna Galimzhanova – 1965
- Minister of social affairs – Zaure S. Omarova – 1966
- Deputy premier minister – Dametken Z. Sarsenova – 1975
- Foreign minister – Akmaral Arystanbekova – 1989

== Kyrgyzstan ==
- Ruler of Alay Kyrgyz – Kurmanjan Datka – 1862

=== Kirghiz Soviet Socialist Republic ===
- Chairman of the Supreme Soviet – Maryam Tugambayeva – 1937
- Acting chairperson of the Central Executive Committee – Kalima Amankulova – 1938
- Deputy minister of finance – Sakin Bergmantrovna – 1952
- Minister of culture – Kuluypa Konduchalova -1958
- Vice-president – B. Musuralieva – 1959
- Deputy premier minister – Sakin Bergmantrovna – 1961
- Minister of foreign affairs – Sakin Bergmantrovna – 1966
- Supreme Court member – Kadicha Apaitova – 1980

=== Kyrgyz Republic ===
- President – Roza Otunbayeva – 2010
- Supreme Court Member – Kadicha Apaitova – 1991
- Chairperson of Constitutional Court – Cholpon Baekova – 1993
- Chairperson of Supreme Court – Janyl Alieva – 2008
- Deputy prime minister – Cholpon Sultanbekova – 2016
- Deputy speaker of Parliament – Aida Kasymalieva – 2018
- Deputy prime minister Altynai Omurbekova – 2019

==== Individual ministries ====
- Foreign minister – Roza Otunbayeva – 1992
- Minister of Education – Chinara Jakypova – 1992
- Chairperson of Social Fund, Minister – Roza Aknazarova – 1999
- Minister of Education – Ishengul Boljurova – 2002
- Minister of labour and Social Protection – Roza Aknazarova – 2004
- Minister of Social Protection – Aigul Ryskulova – 2009
- Minister of Labour and Employment – Aigul Ryskulova – 2010
- Minister of Education and Science – Elvira Sarieva – 2014
- Minister of Education and Science – Gulmira Kudaibergenova – 2015
- Minister of Finance – Baktygul Jeenbaeva -2018

== Kuwait ==
- Undersecretary of Higher Education – Rasha as-Sabakh – 1991
- Minister – Massouma al-Mubarak – 2005.
- Member of the National Assembly – Aseel al-Awadhi, Rola Dashti, Massouma al-Mubarak and Salwa al-Jassar – 2009

== Laos ==
- Cabinet Member and Governor of the Central Bank – Pany Yathotou – 1987
- Minister to the Prime Minister's Office for International Cooperation – Pany Yathotou – 1997

== Lebanon ==
- Member of Parliament – Myrna Bustani – 1963
- Minister of Industry – Leila Al Solh – 2004
- Minister of Finance – Raya Haffar al-Hassan – 2009
- Minister of Energy and Water – Nada Boustani Khoury
- Minister of Defence – Zeina Akar – 2020

== Macau ==
=== Portuguese Macau ===
- Undersecretary of Administration – Adelina Carvalho – 1985
- President of the Legislative Assembly – Susana Chou – 1999

=== Special Administration of PRC China ===
- Secretary for Administration and Justice – Silva Chan – 1999

== Malaysia ==
- Councillor of the Federal Legislative Council (elected) – Che Halimahton Abdul Majid – 1955
- Member of Parliament – Fatimah Hashim, Khadijah Sidek, Zainon Munshi Sulaiman – 1959
- Senator – Aishah Ghani – 1962
- Minister of Social Welfare – Fatimah Hashim – 1969 (First female Minister in Cabinet of Malaysia)
- Minister of General Welfare – Aishah Ghani – 1973
- Minister of Public Enterprises – Rafidah Aziz – 1980
- Minister of Commerce and Industry – Rafidah Aziz – 1987
- Minister of International Trade and Industry – Rafidah Aziz – 1990
- Minister of National Unity and Social Development – Napsiah Omar – 1990
- Minister in the Prime Minister's Department – Siti Zaharah Sulaiman – 1999
- Minister of Women and Family Development – Shahrizat Abdul Jalil – 2001
- Minister of Women, Family and Community Development – Shahrizat Abdul Jalil – 2001
- Minister of Youth and Sports – Azalina Othman Said – 2004
- Minister of Tourism – Azalina Othman Said – 2008
- Minister of Women, Family and Community Development – Ng Yen Yen – 2008 (First female Chinese Minister in Cabinet of Malaysia)
- Leader of the Opposition in the Malaysian Parliament – Wan Azizah Wan Ismail – 2008
- Deputy President of the Dewan Negara – Armani Mahiruddin – 2009
- President of the Municipal Council of Penang Island – Patahiyah Ismail – 2010 (First woman municipal council president in Malaysia)
- Mayor of Petaling Jaya – Alinah Ahmad – 2013 (First woman mayor in Malaysia)
- Speaker of Selangor State Legislative Assembly – Hannah Yeoh – 2013 (First female Speaker in state legislature)
- Leader of the Opposition in the Penang State Legislative Assembly – Jahara Hamid – 2013
- Mayor of Penang Island – Patahiyah Ismail – 2015
- Leader of the Opposition in the Johor State Legislative Assembly – Gan Peck Cheng – 2015
- President of the Municipal Council of Seberang Perai – Maimunah Mohd Sharif – 2016
- Speaker of Perak State Legislative Assembly – S. Thangeswary – 2016
- Deputy Prime Minister – Wan Azizah Wan Ismail – 2018
- Minister of Housing and Local Government – Zuraida Kamaruddin – 2018
- Minister of Rural and Regional Development – Rina Harun – 2018
- Minister of Energy, Technology, Science, Climate Change and Environment – Yeo Bee Yin – 2018
- Minister of Primary Industries – Teresa Kok – 2018
- Chairperson of the Public Accounts Committee – Noraini Ahmad – 2019
- Chief Justice of Malaysia – Tengku Maimun Tuan Mat – 2019
- Chief Commissioner of the Malaysian Anti-Corruption Commission – Latheefa Koya – 2019
- Minister of Higher Education – Noraini Ahmad – 2020
- Deputy Speaker of the Dewan Rakyat – Azalina Othman Said – 2020
- Minister of Education – Fadhlina Sidek – 2022
- Minister of Health – Zaliha Mustafa – 2022

== Maldives ==
- Minister of Health – Moomina Haleem – 1977
- Foreign minister (acting) – Mariyam Shakeela – 2013

== Mongolia ==
=== Mongolian People's Republic ===
- Minister (Minister of Health) – Dolgor Puntsag – 1930
- Head of State (acting) – Sühbaataryn Yanjmaa – 1953
- Minister of Labour – Myatauyn Lhaunsuren – 1970
- Minister of Health and Social Affairs – Pagbajabyn Nymadawa – 1990

=== Mongolia ===
- Foreign minister – Nyam-Osoryn Tuyaa – 1998
- Prime Minister (acting) – Nyam-Osoryn Tuyaa – 1999

== Myanmar ==
=== British Burma ===
- Member of the Legislative Council – Hnin Mya – 1932

=== Burma ===
- Member of Parliament – Khin Kyi – 1947
- Minister for and Premier of the Karen State – Daw Ba Maung Chien – 1952
- Minister of Social Welfare – Khin Kyi – 1953

=== Myanmar ===
- Social Welfare, Relief and Resettlement minister – Myat Myat Ohn Khin – 2012
- Education minister – Khin San Yi – 2014
- Science and Technology minister – Khin San Yi – 2015
- Foreign minister – Aung San Suu Kyi – 2016
- State Counsellor – Aung San Suu Kyi – 2016

== Nepal ==
=== Kingdom ===
- Deputy Minister (of Health and Local Self-Governance) – Dwarika Devi Thakurani – 1959
- Minister of Health – Shusila Thapa – 1975
- Cabinet Member, State Minister for Labour and Social Welfare – Bhadra Kumari Ghale – 1982
- Minister of Industry and Trade – Sahana Pradhan – 1990
- Minister of Forests and Soil Conservation – Sahana Pradhan – 1996
- Minister of Women and Welfare – Sahana Pradhan – 1997
- Deputy Prime Minister – Shailaja Acharya – 1998

=== Republic ===
- Minister of Foreign Affairs – Sahana Pradhan – 2007
- President – Bidhya Devi Bhandari – 2015
- Prime Minister – Sushila Karki – 2025

== North Korea ==
- Central Committee of the Workers' Party of North Korea members – Ho Jong-suk and Pak Chong-ae – 1946
- Minister of Culture – Ho Jong-suk – 1948
- Minister of Justice – Ho Jong-suk – 1957-1959
- Vice-Minister of Light Industry – Kim Pok-sin – 1958
- Minister of Agriculture – Pak Chong-ae – 1961
- Minister of Commerce – Yin Yang-suk – 1962
- Minister of Culture – Pak Yong-sin – 1966
- Minister of Foodstuff and Daily Necessities Industries – Yi Ho-hyok – 1967
- Minister of Textile and Paper Manufacturing Industry – Kim Pok-sin – 1971
- Minister of Finance – Yun Gi-jong – 1980
- Vice Premier – Kim Pok-sin – 1982
- Head of the Light Industry Division of the Worker's Party Economic Policy Audit Department – Kim Kyung-hee – 1988
- Minister of Electronics Industry – Han Kwang-bok – 2009
- Chairperson of the Korean Committee for Cultural Relations with Foreign Countries – Kim Jong-suk – 2009
- Deputy Prime Minister – Han Kwang-bok – 2010
- Vice-director of the Workers Party's Propaganda and Agitation Department – Kim Yo-jong – 2014
- Minister of Foreign Affairs – Choe Son-hui – 2022

== Oman ==
- Undersecretary for Social Affairs in the Ministry of Social Affairs, Labour and Vocational Training – Thuwaibah bint Ahmad Bin Isa Al-Barwani – 1997
- Government Minister (Minister of Higher Education) – Rawya Saud Al Busaidi – 2004

== Pakistan ==
=== Dominion ===
- Deputy Speaker – Begum Jahanara Shahnawaz – 1947
- Member of Parliament – Begum Shaista Suhrawardy Ikramullah – 1947

=== Republic ===
==== National level ====
- Cabinet minister – Education – Begum Mahmooda Salim Khan – 1962
- Governor (of Sindh) – Begum Ra'ana Liaquat Ali Khan – 1973
- Chair of Major Political Party (Pakistan Peoples Party) – Nusrat Bhutto – 1979
- Prime Minister – Benazir Bhutto – 1988
- Deputy Prime Minister – Nusrat Bhutto – 1980s
- Speaker of the National Assembly of Pakistan – Fahmida Mirza – 2008

==== Individual ministries ====
- Minister of State of Science and Technology – Shahzada Saaedur Rashid Abbasi – 1975
- Minister of State of Tourism – Shahzada Saaedur Rashid Abbasi – 1976
- Minister of Population – Dr. Attiya Inayatullah – 1980
- Government Advisor and Chairperson of Tourist Development Corporation – Viqarun Nisa Noon – 1980
- Minister of State of Social Welfare – Begum Afifa Mamdot – 1981
- Minister of Information – Syeda Abida Hussain – 1990
- Minister to the prime minister, Advisor on Population with Rank of Minister – Syeda Abida Hussain – 1991
- Minister of Finance – Benazir Bhutto – 1993
- Minister of Law and Human Rights – Shahida Jamil – 2002
- Minister of Foreign Affairs – Hina Rabbani Khar – 2011

=== West Pakistan ===
West Pakistan was in existence from 1955 to 1970.

- Minister of Education (1962–65) – Begum Mahmooda Salim Khan

=== Balochistan ===
- Minister (1976) – Fazila Aliani
- Minister of Health, Education and Social Welfare (1976) – Fazila Aliani

=== Gilgit-Baltistan ===
- Governor – Shama Khalid – 2010

=== Punjab ===
- Parliamentary Secretary (1951) – Begum Khudeja G.A. Khan
- Chief Minister – Maryam Nawaz – 2024

=== Sindh ===
- Governor (1973) – Begum Ra'ana Liaquat Ali Khan

== Palestine ==
- Minister of Social Affairs – Intissar al-Wazir – 1995
- Minister of Higher Education and Research – Hanan Ashrawi – 1996
- Mayor of Ramallah – Janet Mikhail – 2005
- General Delegate of Palestine to the EU, Belgium and Luxembourg – Leila Shahid – 2006

== Philippines ==
=== Commonwealth ===
- Member of Congress – Elisa Ochoa – 1941

=== Republic ===
==== National level ====
- Senator – Geronima Pecson – 1947
- Cabinet secretary – Social Welfare – Asuncion A. Perez – 1948
- Governor – Metropolitan Manila – Imelda Romualdez Marcos – 1975
- President – Corazon Aquino – 1986
- Senate President pro tempore – Leticia Ramos-Shahani − 1993
- Vice President – Gloria Macapagal Arroyo – 1998
- Senate Majority leader – Loren Legarda – 2001
- Chief Justice of the Supreme Court – Maria Lourdes Sereno – 2012
- Speaker of the House of Representatives – Gloria Macapagal Arroyo – 2018

==== Individual ministries ====
- Secretary of Education – Lourdes Quisumbing – 1986
- Secretary of Agrarian Reform – Miriam Defensor Santiago – 1989
- Secretary of Tourism – Gemma Cruz-Araneta – 1998
- Secretary of Justice – Merceditas N. Gutierrez – 2002
- Secretary of Foreign Affairs – Delia Albert – 2003
- Secretary of Finance – Juanita Amatong – 2003
- Secretary of National Defense – Gloria Macapagal Arroyo – 2003 (concurrently as President of the Philippines)

== Qatar ==
- President (with rank of Minister) of the Supreme Council for Family Affairs – Mozah Bint Nasser Al Misnad – 1998

== Saudi Arabia ==
- Deputy Minister of Education for Women's Affairs – Norah al-Faiz – 2009
- Assistant Speaker of the Consultative Assembly of Saudi Arabia – Hanan Al-Ahmadi – 2020

== Singapore ==
- Minister of State of Community Development – Seet Ai Mee – 1988
- Minister of State of Health and Education – Aline K. Wong – 1990
- Minister in Prime Minister's Office – Lim Hwee Hua – 2009
- Ministry of Culture, Community and Youth – Grace Fu – 2015
- Speaker of the Parliament – Halimah Yacob – 2013
- President – Halimah Yacob – 2017
- Ministry of Manpower – Josephine Teo – 2018
- Ministry of Sustainability and Environment – Grace Fu – 2020
- Ministry of Communications and Information – Josephine Teo – 2021

== South Korea ==
- Minister of Trade and Industry – Yim Yong-shin (Louise Yim) – 1948
- Minister of Information – Kim Whal-ran – 1950
- Minister of Education – Kim Ok-Gil – 1979
- Minister of Social Affairs and Health – Kim Chung-rye – 1982
- Minister of the Second Ministry of Political Affairs – Cho Kyung-hee – 1988
- Secretary of State for Political Affairs – Cho Kyung-hee – 1989
- Minister of Environment – Hwang San-suy – 1993
- Minister of Culture and Tourism – Shin Nak-yun – 1998
- Minister of Health and Welfare – Joo Yang-ja – 1998
- Presidential Secretary for Public Relations Affairs – Park Sun-sook – 1999
- Acting Prime Minister – Chang Sang – 2002
- Minister of Justice – Kang Kum-sil – 2003–2004
- Prime Minister – Han Myung-Sook – 2006
- President – Park Geun-hye – 2013
- Deputy Prime Minister – Yoo Eun-hae – 2018

== Sri Lanka ==
=== British Ceylon ===
- Member of the State Council – Adeline Molamure – 1931
- Member of Parliament – Florence Senanayake – 1947
- Senator – Adeline Molamure – 1947

=== Dominion ===
- Minister of Health – Vimala Wijewardene – 1956
- Minister of Foreign Affairs – Sirimavo Bandaranaike – 1960
- Minister of Defence – Sirimavo Bandaranaike – 1960
- Prime minister – Sirimavo Bandaranaike – 1960 (first female prime minister in the world)

=== Republic ===
- Prime minister – Chandrika Kumaratunga – 1993
- President – Chandrika Kumaratunga – 1994
- Minister of Justice – Thalatha Athukorale – 2017

== Syria ==
- Member of Parliament – Jihan al-Mosli and Widad Haroun – 1960
- Minister of Culture – Najah al-Attar – 1976
- Minister of Higher Education – Salimah Sanqar – 1992
- Minister of National Guidance – Najah al-Attar – 1994
- Minister of Labour and Social Affairs – Baria al-Qudsi – 2000
- Vice President – Najah al-Attar – 2006

== Tajikistan ==
=== Tajik Soviet Socialist Republic ===
- Vice-president – K. Alueva – 1960
- Deputy Premier Minister – A.N. Atanepesova – 1960
- Deputy Chair of the Presidium of the Supreme Soviet – Nizoramo Zaripova – 1966
- Secretary of the Communist Party Central Committee Department of Propaganda and Agitation – Ibodat Rakhimova – 1966
- Minister of Trade Raisa – M. Grishiha – 1974
- Minister of Social Affairs – Karomat Mirzoalieva – 1978
- Acting president – Nizoramo Zaripova – 1984

=== Tajik Republic ===
- Minister of Health – Inumzada Jura – 1992
- Minister, Chairperson of the State-Committee of Youth, Sports and Tourism Zebiniso – S. Rustamova – 1992
- Minister of Education – Bozgul Dodkhudoeva – 1993
- Deputy Premier Minister – Munira Abdulloyevna Inoyatova – 1994
- Deputy Minister of Foreign Affairs – Ozoda Rahmon – 2009

== Taiwan ==
- Minister and Commissioner for Overseas Chinese – He Xiangning – 1949
- Justice on the Supreme Court of the Republic of China – Chang Chin-lan – 1967
- Mayor of Chiayi, first elected female city mayor – Hsu Shih-hsien – 1967
- Deputy Chairperson of the Economic Planning Council – Shirley Kuo – 1973
- Minister of Finance, first appointed female minister – Shirley Kuo – 1988
- Minister of Justice – Yeh Chin-fong – 1999
- Vice President – Annette Lu – 2000
- Vice Premier – Yeh Chu-lan – 2004
- Minister of Transportation and Communications – Yeh Chu-lan – 2004
- President of National Assembly of the Republic of China – Yeh Chu-lan – 2005
- Secretary-General to the President of the Republic of China – Yeh Chu-lan – 2005
- Mayor of Kaohsiung, first elected female mayor of a special municipality – Kiku Chen – 2006
- Chairperson of the Democratic Progressive Party, first elected female leader of a major party - Tsai Ing-Wen – 2008
- Vice President of the Legislative Yuan (Deputy Speaker of Parliament) – Hung Hsiu-chu – 2012
- President – Tsai Ing-wen – 2016
- Minister of Interior – Liu Shyh-fang – 2024

== Tannu Tuva ==
- Chairperson of the Presidium of the Little Hural (head of state) – Khertek Anchimaa-Toka – 1940

== Thailand ==
- Member of Parliament – Orapin Chaiyakan – 1949
- Minister of Transport – Lursakdi Sampatisiri – 1976 (one of the two first female Ministers)
- Minister of State University Affairs (now defunct) – Wimonsiri Chamnanwet – 1976 (one of the two first female Ministers)
- Minister for Office of the Prime Minister – Supatra Masdit – 1986
- Minister of Public Health – Sudarat Keyuraphan – 2001
- Minister of Culture – Uraiwan Thienthong – 2002
- Minister of Labour – Uraiwan Thienthong – 2003
- Second Deputy Speaker of House of Representatives – Lalita Lerksamran – 2005
- Minister of Agriculture and Cooperatives – Sudarat Keyuraphan – 2005
- Minister of Energy – Poonpirom Liptapanlop – 2008
- Minister of Natural Resources and Environment – Anongwan Thepsuthin – 2008
- Second Vice President of Senate – Tassana Boontong – 2008
- Minister of Commerce – Pornthiva Nakasai – 2008
- Minister of Information and Communication Technology – Ranongrak Suwanchawee – 2008
- Minister of Science and Technology (now defunct) – Kalaya Sophonpanich – 2008
- Prime Minister – Yingluck Shinawatra – 2011
- Minister of Defence – Yingluck Shinawatra – 2013
- Minister of Social Development and Human Security – Paweena Hongsakul – 2013
- Minister of Tourism and Sports – Kobkarn Wattanavrangkul – 2014
- Minister of Industry – Atchaka Sibunruang – 2015
- Minister of Education – Trinuch Thienthong – 2021
- First Deputy Speaker of House of Representatives – Mallika Jirapunvanit – 2026

== Turkmenistan ==
=== Turkmen Soviet Socialist Republic ===
- Deputy Minister of Public Service – Khally Nazarova – 1958
- Minister of Social Affairs – Khally Nazarova – 1959
- Minister of Social Welfare – Anzurat Mullabavna Rakhimova – 1960
- Deputy Premier Minister – Khally Nazarova – 1963
- Minister of Education – Bibi Palvanova – 1967
- Deputy Premier Minister – Roza Atamuradovna Bazarova – 1975
- Member of the Presidium of Supreme Soviet – Roza Atamuradovna Bazarova – 1975
- President of the Republic – Roza Atamuradovna Bazarova – 1988

=== Turkmenistan (1991–present) ===
- Member of the Cabinet and Prosecutor General – Gurbanbibi Sinirenovna Atajanova – 1997
- Minister of Social Affairs and Labour – Enebay Geldiyevna Atayeva – 2001
- Minister of Economy and Finance – Enebay Geldiyevna Atayeva – 2001

== United Arab Emirates ==
- Under-Secretary (of Education) – Aysha al-Sayaar (Aisha al-Sayer) – 1996
- Minister (of Economic Planning) – Lubna bint Khalid bin Sultan al Qasimi – 2004

== Uzbekistan ==
=== Uzbek Soviet Socialist Republic ===
- Minister of Construction Industry – Yagdar Nasriddinova – 1952
- Chairman of the Presidium of the Supreme Soviet – Yagdar Nasriddinova – 1959
- Minister of Culture – Zakha Rakhimbabaeva – 1963
- Minister of Social Affairs – Vasiha Sadykovna Sadykova – 1956
- Minister of Public Service – Anna Brodova – 1967
- Minister of Justice – Mamlakat Sobirovna Vasikova – 1970–1984
- Deputy Premier Minister – Rano Kh. Abdullaeva – 1971

=== Republic of Uzbekistan ===
- Foreign minister – Shahlo Mahmudova – 1991

== Vietnam ==
- Minister of Social Affairs, Health and the Disabled – Dương Quỳnh Hoa – 1975 (in North Vietnam 1969)
- Minister of Education – Nguyễn Thị Định – 1976
- Member of the Council of State – Nguyễn Thị Định – 1981
- Vice President – Nguyễn Thị Định – 1987
- Chairwoman of National Assembly – Nguyễn Thị Kim Ngân – 2016
- President (Acting) – Đặng Thị Ngọc Thịnh – 2018

== Yemen ==
=== South Yemen ===
- Member of The Presidium of the State and Deputy Minister of Information and Culture – 1986

=== Yemen ===
- Undersecretary of Information – Amat Al Alim Alsoswa – 1991
- Minister of Human Rights – Amat Al-Aleem Alsoswa – 2003
- Ministry of State for Human Rights – Wahiba Fara’a – 2001

== See also ==
- List of elected and appointed female heads of state and government
