= Khadija Ahrari =

Afghan politician

Member of the House of the People
- In office 1965–1969
- Constituency: Herat

Khadija Ahrari was an Afghan politician, and jointly the first woman elected to parliament in the country.

Following the introduction of women's suffrage in the 1964 constitution, Ahrari was one of four women elected to Parliament in the 1965 elections, representing Herat.

She was one of the first six women to be member of Parliament or Senate after the 1965 elections: Anahita Ratibzad of Kabul, Khadija Ahrari of Kabul, Ruqia Abubakr of Kandhahar and Masuma Esmati of Herat for the House of the People, and Homaira Saljuqi and Aziza Gardizi for the Senate.

However, she did not contest the 1969 elections.
