= Roqia Abubakr =

Afghan politician

Member of House of the People
- In office 1965–1969
- Constituency: First District Kabul City

Personal details
- Born: 7 June 1917

Roqia Abubakr (7 June 1917 – ?) was an Afghan politician, and jointly the first woman elected to parliament in the country.

== Biography ==
Born in 1917, Abubakr married her first husband M. Yousof in August 1933. He died two years later. She studied at the Faculty of Sociology at Kabul University, and became a teacher in 1940. Between 1941 and 1949, she was director of the Zarghuna Girls School in Kabul. In 1945 she married M. Abubakr; the couple had two daughters and a son, and divorced in 1970.

After leaving Zarghuna Girls School, she worked as general director of the Women's Welfare Society until 1962, before joining the Ministry of Education in 1963. She also served as general director of the Red Crescent Society.

In 1964 Abubakr was elected to the Constitutional Assembly that drew up the 1964 constitution, which introduced women's suffrage. She was subsequently one of four women elected to Parliament in the 1965 elections, representing the First District of Kabul City.

She was one of the first six women to be member of Parliament after the 1965 elections: Anahita Ratibzad of Kabul, Khadija Ahrari of Kabul, Ruqia Abubakr of Kandhahar and Masuma Esmati of Herat for the House of the People, and Homaira Saljuqi and Aziza Gardizi for the Senate.

However, she did not contest the 1969 elections.

Abubakr returned to the Ministry of Education, serving as national director of the literacy programme from 1972 until 1973. She was also a presenter on Radio Afghanistan for five years.
