= 1964 Afghan Constitutional Assembly election =

- 1964

Constitutional Assembly elections were held in Afghanistan in 1964. The Assembly produced the 1964 constitution, which introduced women's suffrage.

== Background ==
In March 1963 King Mohammed Zahir Shah asked Prime Minister Mohammed Daoud Khan to resign due to the Pashtunistan dispute, which strained Afghanistan–Pakistan relations. Two weeks later, Zahir Shah appointed a commission to write a new constitution.

The new constitution barred members of the royal family (with the exception of the monarch) from involvement in politics, a clause that was viewed as aiming to bar Daoud Khan from returning to office. It provided for a bicameral parliament, introducing women's suffrage and giving women the right to stand for office. An independent judiciary was introduced, with sharia law was to be used where no government law existed.

After the constitution was drafted, it was reviewed by a 29-member committee, whose members included Kubra Noorzai and Masuma Esmati-Wardak.

In order to approve the constitution, Zahir Shah convened a loya jirga in the spring of 1964. The 452-member body included the 14 members of the cabinet, the 176 members of the National Assembly, the 19 members of the Senate, the five Supreme Court justices, 176 elected members, 34 members appointed by the king, seven members of the constitutional committee and 24 members of the commission that had produced the draft (three attendees were members of more than one category).

== Aftermath ==
When convened, the loya jirga included ten women, including Roqia Abubakr. One of them gave birth during its deliberations.

The document was signed by all 452 members on 20 September. It was promulgated on 30 September after being signed by the king. The first parliamentary elections under the new constitution were held in August–September 1965 and saw two women elected to the House of the People.
