= 1965 Afghan parliamentary election =

- 26 August–26 September 1965

All 215 seats in the House of the People 29 of the 87 seats in the Senate

Parliamentary elections were held in Afghanistan in August and September 1965. Members of the Senate were elected between 26 August and 7 September, and members of the House of the People between 10 and 26 September. Following the introduction of women's suffrage in the 1964 constitution, four women were elected to the House of People and two were appointed the Senate.

== Electoral system ==
The 215 members of the House of the People were elected using first-past-the-post voting in single-member constituencies. The 87 members of the Senate included 29 appointed by the king, 29 directly elected and 29 elected by the provincial assemblies (one member from each province).

The voting age was 20. Candidates for the House of the People were required to be at least 26 years old, and candidates for the Senate 31.

In polling stations there was a voting box for each candidate with their photograph and symbol; voters placed their ballot paper in the box of the candidate they wished to vote for.

== Campaign ==
Although the previous parliament had passed a law allowing for the creation of political parties, it had not been signed by the king. As a result, all candidates ran as independents. However, several unofficial parties ran candidates with beliefs ranging from fundamentalist Islam to far left.

== Results ==
Turnout was very low, leading to the vocal predominance of Kabul's radicals. Four members of the PDPA were elected, although, only two were widely known as being PDPA members; Babrak Karmal and Anahita Ratebzad, who were both elected in Kabul.

Four women were elected; Roqia Abubakr and Anahita Ratebzad in Kabul, Khadija Ahrari in Herat and Masuma Esmati-Wardak in Kandahar.

As the provincial assemblies were never convened, the Senate consisted only of the 29 members appointed by the king and the 29 directly elected members. Two of the appointed members – Aziza Gardizi and Homeira Seljuqi – were women.

=== List of members ===
Appointed Senators
Sardar Sultan Ahmad
Mohammad Ali
Abdul Hamid Aziz
Abdul Haq Baitab
Mohammad Omar Bulbul Afghan
Aziza Gardizi
Mir Ghulam Haider
Sayyed Daoud Husseini
Mawlavi Ghulam Nabi Kamawi
Maulana Keyamuddin Khadim
Mohammad Amin Khogyani
Mohammad Hashim Mojaddidi
Mawlavi Abdul Rab
Abdul Rasool
Abdul Samad
Homeira Seljuqi
Fakir Mohammad Shafa
Mir Mohammad Shah
Mohammad Zaman Taraki
Mawlavi Abdul Khaliq Wasiee
Abdul Wakil
Abdul Shukoor Wali
Mohammad Amin Younusi
Source: Kabul Times

== Aftermath ==
The newly elected parliament convened on 14 October. In a preliminary session the day before, Abdul Zahir was elected president of the House of the People. On the same day, Abdul Hadi Dawi was appointed president of the Senate by the king.

Eleven days later dissident leftist students, dissatisfied with the newly appointed cabinet, disrupted the meetings and rioting ensued. Prime Minister Mohammad Yusuf resigned on 29 October and the king appointed Mohammad Hashim Maiwandwal to form a cabinet, which was confirmed on 2 November.
