= Rakhimov =

Rakhimov is a surname, slavicised from the Arabic male given name Rahim. Its female version is Rakhimova. Notable people with the surname include:

- Baxtiyor Rahimov (born c. 1963), rebel leader in Uzbekistan who advocates an Islamic republic
- Ibodat Rakhimova, Soviet-Tajikistani politician
- Murtaza Rakhimov (1934–2023), President of the Republic of Bashkortostan, Russia
- Kamilla Rakhimova (born 2001), Uzbekistani female tennis player
- Rashid Rakhimov (born 1965), Tajikistani football coach and former footballer
- Gafur Rakhimov (born 1951), businessman and alleged crime lord
- Sevinch Rakhimova, Uzbekistani karateka
- Sobir Rakhimov (or Sabir Rakhimov), Uzbek general and hero of USSR during World War II
