= Soraya Parlika =

Afghan women's rights activist and politician (1944–2019)

Soraya Parlika (1944-2019) was an Afghan women's rights activist and politician (People's Democratic Party of Afghanistan). She served as Chairperson of the Democratic Women's Organisation of Afghanistan (DOAW) in 1978 and in 1979–1981. She served as head of Afghanistan's Red Crescent Society in 1986–1992.

== Life ==
=== Early life and education ===
She was born in a well-to-do Pashtun family from the village Kamari in the Bagrami district southeast of Kabul. She was the daughter of Muhammad Harif, the head of the construction department of the Ministry of Public Works. She was the sister of Abdul Wakil, who was foreign minister in the government of Najibullah from 1986 to 1992.

She studied at the Zarghuna High School in central Kabul, and obtained a bachelor's degree from the University of Kabul in 1966. She then worked at Kabul city's housing department and at the international relations department of the Kabul University.

=== Early activism ===
She became a member of the People's Democratic Party of Afghanistan (PDPA) after its foundation on 1 January 1965, and the same year, she became one of the co-founders of the Democratic Women's Organisation of Afghanistan (DOAW).

As member of the DOAW, she participated in mobilising women to take part in the 1965 parliamentary election, and in teaching rural women how to read and write. She also participated in the demonstrations against a draft law proposed by conservative Islamic members to ban girls and women from studying abroad, a month of protests which included an occupation of the parliament, until the bill was dropped.

=== Communist regime ===
In 1978, the PDPA took power in Afghanistan and the DOAW was legalised. She temporarily served as chairman of the DOAW when Anahita Ratebzad was appointed cabinet minister. When the Khalqis-fraction took power, however she, as a member of the Parcham-fraction, was imprisoned in the Pul-e Charkhi jail in Kabul until the Soviet invasion in 1979, when the Parcham-fraction returned to power.

She served as Chairman of the DOAW in 1979–1981, and was the deputy of Anahita Ratebzad in 1981–1986.

She successfully worked for extended maternity leave to 90 days, with 180 days of possible additional unpaid leave; retirement at the age of 55 and the establishment of nursery schools and kindergartens in workplaces, which was formally introduced by the PDPA after the advocacy of her and the DOAW.

She served as head of Afghanistan's Red Crescent Society in 1986–1992. She was removed from the post after the fall of the Communist regime in April 1992.

=== Mujahideen and Taliban regime ===
She founded the Ettehadiya-ye Sarasari-ye Zanan-e Afghanistan (All-Afghanistan Women's Union, AAWU; in some sources ‘Association’ and AAWA), which worked under cower during the Taliban regime to provide women with home schooling and underground home training courses.

=== Later career ===
After the fall of the Taleban regime in 2001, she planned a women's march in Kabul, but was persuaded to abandon the plans.

She started a campaign for women's rights: among other things, she demanded that women's equality to be included in the future Afghan constitution, and mandatory education for girls through secondary school.

In 2001, Time magazine selected her as one of its global ‘people of the year’.

She was appointed to the 21-member Preparatory Commission for the 2002 Emergency Loya Jirga. In 2003 she was elected as one of the two deputy heads of the Hezb-e Muttahed-e Melli-ye Afghanistan (the National United Party of Afghanistan, NUPA).

In 2004 she was elected a delegate to the 2004 Constitutional Loya Jirga. In 2005, she failed to gain a seat in the Parliament.

== Legacy ==
After her death in 2019, President Ashraf Ghani and Chief Executive Abdullah Abdullah issued a statements of commemoration.

She was the subject of a documentary by Sahraa Karimi.
