= Leadership of Communist Kyrgyzstan =

First Secretary of Kirghizia
- Republic coat of arms

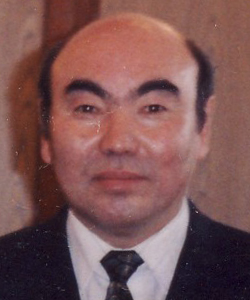
- Askar Akayev
- Appointer: Politburo, Central Committee or any party apparatus and by electoral vote
- Formation: October 14, 1924
- First holder: M.D. Kamensky (as First Secretary)
- Final holder: Askar Akayev (as President)
- Abolished: August 31, 1991 (declared); December 25, 1991 (official)

In 1919, the Kara-Kyrgyz Autonomous Oblast was created in Soviet Russia. This was the precursor to the Kirghiz Soviet Socialist Republic (commonly known as Kirghizia) which was established in 1936 as republic in its own right within the Union of Soviet Socialist Republics (USSR).

With the Soviet Union came electricity, water, irrigation, industrialization and literacy to Kyrgyzstan, and the other Soviet Central Asian countries. Scholars such as Alec Nove and J.A. Newth have argued that most development indicators suggests that the Soviet Muslim countries far-exceeded those Muslim countries outside the Soviet sphere of influence. The administrative, political and economic system was revolutionary by Kyrgiz standards, however, numerical indicators of development only partially supports this view, with one claiming that 63.2% of Kyrgyzstan's population still lived in rural areas. This was, however, the highest of any country in Central Asia. The country's higher urbanization rate is in large part because of its large Russian population, with most Europeans living in urban areas. Russian immigration slowed in 1959, the same year the national birth rate increased. However, the indigenous population had for the most part been untouched by Sovietization, an example being that religion was still widespread.

In spite of intense efforts to create socialism from "scratch", the social institutions led to infiltrations by religious, tribal and communal group into the political system. After the death of Joseph Stalin, the level of repression declined and less surveillance from the KGB and Moscow led to an increase in the importance of tribes in communal affairs.

== Kara-Kirghiz Autonomous Oblast (1924–1925) and Kirghiz Autonomous Oblast (1925–1926) ==
Holders	Took office	Left office	Nationality
First Secretary of the Kirghiz Provincial Organization of the All-Union Communist Party
M.D. Kamensky	1924	1925	Russian
Nikolay Uzyukov	1925	1926	Russian

== Kirghiz Autonomous Soviet Socialist Republic (1926–1936) ==
=== Heads of government ===
Holders	Took office	Left office
Chairmen of the Council of People's Commissars
Yusup Abdrakhmanov	March 12, 1927	September 27, 1933
Bayaly Isakeyev	September 27, 1933	December 5, 1936

=== Heads of party ===
Holders	Took office	Left office	Nationality
First Secretary of the Kirghiz Provincial Organization of the All-Union Communist Party
Nikolay Uzyukov	1926	1927	Russian
Vladimir Shubrikov	1927	1929	Russian
Mikhail Kulkov	1929	1930	Russian
Aleksandr Shakhray	1930	1934	Russian
Moris Belotsky	1934	December 5, 1936	Jewish

=== Heads of state ===
Holders	Took office	Left office
Chairmen of the Central Executive Committee
Abdukadyr Urazbekov	March 12, 1927	December 5, 1936

== Kirghiz Soviet Socialist Republic (1936–1991) ==
=== Heads of government ===
Holders	Took office	Left office
Chairmen of the Council of People's Commissars
Bayaly Isakeyev	December 5, 1936	September 8, 1937
Murat Salikhov	September 8, 1937	February 15, 1938
Ismail Abuzyarov	February 15, 1938	April 27, 1938
Ivan Rebrov	April 27, 1938	July 19, 1938
Turabay Kulatov	July 19, 1938	November 14, 1945
Iskhak Razzakov	November 14, 1945	July 10, 1950
Chairmen of the Council of Ministers
Abdy Suyerkulov	July 10, 1950	March 6, 1958
Kazy Dikambayev	March 6, 1958	May 10, 1961
Bolot Mambetov	May 16, 1961	January 23, 1968
Akhmatbek Suyumbayev	January 23, 1968	December 22, 1978
Sultan Ibraimov	December 22, 1978	December 4, 1980
Pyotr Khodos	December 4, 1980	January 21, 1981
Arstanbek Duysheyev	January 21, 1981	May 20, 1986
Apas Jumagulov	May 20, 1986	21 Jan 1991

=== Heads of party ===
Holders	Took office	Left office	Nationality
Chairmen of the Central Executive Committee
Moris Belotsky	December 5, 1936	March 1937	Jewish
First Secretary of the Communist Party of Kirghizia
Maksim Ammosov	April 23, 1937	February 20, 1938	Russian
Aleksey Vagov	February 20, 1938	July 1945	Russian
Nikolay Bogolyubov	July 1945	July 7, 1950	Kyrgyz
Iskhak Razzakov	July 7, 1950	May 9, 1961	Kyrgyz
Turdakun Usubaliyev	May 9, 1961	November 2, 1985	Kyrgyz
Absamat Masaliyev	November 2, 1985	April 6, 1991	Kyrgyz
Jumgalbek Amanbayev	April 6, 1991	August 29, 1991	Kyrgyz

=== Heads of state ===
Holders	Took office	Left office
Chairmen of the Central Executive Committee
Abdukadyr Urazbekov	1936	September 16, 1937
Mikhail Us	September 16, 1937	October 4, 1937
Maryam Tugambayeva	September 16, 1937	October 4, 1937
Sultankul Shamurzin	October 4, 1937	December 16, 1937
Ivan Sokolov	December 16, 1937	February 15, 1938
Murat Salikhov	February 15, 1938	May 15, 1938
Kalima Amankulova	May 15, 1938	July 18, 1938
Chairman of the Supreme Soviet
I.P. Boryak	July 18, 1938	July 19, 1938
Chairmen of the Presidium of the Supreme Soviet
Asanaly Tolubayev	July 18, 1938	March 22, 1943
Moldogazy Tokobayev	March 22, 1943	November 14, 1945
Turabay Kulatov	November 14, 1945	August 25, 1978
Sultan Ibraimov	August 25, 1978	December 22, 1978
Andrey Buss	December 22, 1978	January 10, 1979
Arstanbek Duysheyev	January 10, 1979	January 14, 1981
Temirbek Koshoyev	January 14, 1981	August 8, 1987
Tashtanbek Akmatov	August 8, 1987	April 10, 1990
Chairman of the Supreme Soviet
Absamat Masaliyev	April 10, 1990	October 27, 1990
President of Kyrgyzstan
Askar Akayev	October 27, 1990	December 25, 1991

== See also ==
- President of Kyrgyzstan
- Vice President of Kyrgyzstan
- Prime Minister of Kyrgyzstan
