= 2003 loya jirga =

A 502-delegate loya jirga convened in Kabul, Afghanistan, on 14 December 2003, to consider the proposed Afghan Constitution. Originally planned to last ten days, the assembly did not endorse the charter until 4 January 2004. As has generally been the case with such assemblies, the endorsement came by way of consensus rather than a vote. Afghanistan's previous constitution had been drafted for the Democratic Republic of Afghanistan in November 1987.

Because of strife within the assembly, the 2003 loya jirga was dubbed by some Afghans the loya jagra ("big fight").

== Background ==
The Bonn Agreement of December 2001 required Afghanistan to draft and adopt a new constitution. Specifically, under Section I(6) of the agreement, a Constitutional Loya Jirga was to be convened within eighteen months of the establishment of the Transitional Authority, in order to adopt a new constitution for Afghanistan.

== Drafting the constitution ==
In October 2002, Interim President Hamid Karzai appointed a nine-member Constitutional Drafting Commission, chaired by Vice-President Nematullah Shahrani. Over the following six months, this body drafted a new constitution based largely on the 1964 Afghan constitution. The initial draft, written primarily by Abdul Salam Azimi (who would become Chief Justice of Afghanistan's Supreme Court in 2006), was not the subject of in-depth political consultation.

In April 2003, Interim President Karzai issued a decree appointing a new 35-member Constitutional Commission and laying out a public consultation process. This commission travelled widely throughout the country and reworked the draft, which was not released to the public until November 2003 — only weeks before the Constitutional Loya Jirga was scheduled to begin. The delay in release of the draft meant that distribution of printed copies and public education efforts began in earnest less than a month before the convening of the national conference. The process was supported by several international institutions that provided funding, mostly through the United Nations, as well as technical expertise.

== Selection of delegates ==
In July 2003, a Presidential Decree outlined the process for delegate selection for the Constitutional Loya Jirga (CLJ). The decree stated that there would be 500 delegates in total: 344 elected by caucus at the district level; 64 women elected by caucus at the provincial level; 42 delegates from refugee, nomad, and minority communities; and 50 people (25 men and 25 women) appointed by President Karzai. The delegates included activists such as Shukria Barakzai, who campaigns for women's rights.

Members of constitutional commissions, the Supreme Court and other government officials, and members of legal and human rights commissions were permitted to attend, but not to vote. Provincial governors and senior police, administrative, and military officials were barred from the proceedings.

== Proceedings ==
=== Opening and election of the chairman ===
The loya jirga was convened on 14 December beneath a large tent on the grounds of the newly refurbished technical university in Kabul. In the opening ceremonies, a dozen children in traditional costumes waved Afghan flags and sang songs of peace. Former King of Afghanistan (1933–73) Mohammad Zahir Shah addressed the assembly. Mojaddedi was subsequently elected chairman, winning 252 votes against Abdul Hafiz Mansoor's 154. Deputies were elected but excluded women; many of the 114 female delegates protested at not being represented in the secretariat. To address their concerns, Mojaddedi appointed Safia Sediqi to the fourth deputy position and two other women as deputies' assistants.

Delegates were divided among ten committees to consider amendments to the draft constitution, which were submitted to a reconciliation council. Powerful militia leaders were part of various groups, often dominating discussions.

=== Key debates ===
Issues involving substantial debate included: whether Afghanistan should have a presidential or parliamentary system of government; whether Dari or Pashto should be the official language, and whether other local languages would be recognised; whether former King Mohammed Zahir Shah should maintain the title "father of the nation"; how to address women's rights; whether Afghanistan should adopt a free market economy; and whether higher education should be free.

The most contentious debate surrounded the question of whether the constitution should establish a presidential or a parliamentary system. Interim President Karzai supported a draft constitution creating a presidential system, which would provide a single nationally elected figure who could effectively direct the executive branch. Others argued that, for an ethnically diverse country emerging from years of conflict, a power-sharing model with a strong prime minister offered the best hope for national unity and reconciliation. At one point, President Karzai threatened that he would not stand for election in 2004 if a parliamentary or semi-presidential system were adopted. Members of the Tajik-dominated Northern Alliance accused Karzai of buying off opponents with promises of influential positions in a post-election government.

Following the highly restrictive regime of the Taliban, certain rights — including those related to entertainment — were legalised again. However, liberals in the loya jirga were strongly challenged by conservatives, many of whom favoured policies such as the ban on music and dancing on public television.

=== Malalai Joya incident ===
On the third day of the assembly, Malalai Joya, a 25-year-old female delegate from Farah Province, was temporarily evicted after complaining that warlords would still be in charge of the new government. Her microphone was cut off when she called for certain leaders to be tried in an international court. She remained under UN protection for several days owing to death threats. Joya's speech attracted international media coverage and drew controversy when she condemned the allocation of positions of influence at the council to certain faction leaders, including former president Burhanuddin Rabbani and Abdul Rasul Sayyaf, a deeply conservative Islamist.

=== Minority boycott and adjournment ===
On 1 January 2004, the loya jirga broke down when close to half of the assembly — consisting mostly of Uzbek, Tajik, Hazara, and Turkmen minorities — boycotted the only ballot, forcing chairman Mojaddedi to call for a two-day adjournment.

== Name controversy ==
Delegates collected more than the necessary 151 signatures calling for the word "Islamic" to be removed from the draft constitution, proposing "Republic of Afghanistan" instead. Despite the requisite number of signatures having been obtained, chairman Mojaddedi refused to hold a vote and publicly referred to the signatories as "infidels", raising concerns about freedom of speech.

== Ratification ==
After weeks of contentious debate, a walkout by the chairman and hundreds of delegates, and dozens of amendments, the loya jirga ratified the constitution by consensus — without taking a formal vote — on 4 January 2004. The constitution was formally ratified by President Karzai at a ceremony in Kabul on 26 January 2004.

Many delegates complained that the process had no specific criteria, that the rules of procedure were not followed, and that delegates had not been properly prepared or informed about the issues. There were also complaints that many of the most important decisions were made by militia and party leaders, Karzai's favoured associates, and international representatives — such as US envoy Zalmay Khalilzad — behind the scenes.
