= Hamnazar =

Hamnazar (Dari: Alliance) is a major political party in Afghanistan's Meshrano Jirga. It consists of mainly pro-Karzai MPs, who are Western sympathizers. The group numbers some thirty parliamentarians, and is led by Amin Zai.

== Sources ==
- Logar Province, Center for Culture and Conflict Studies. (US) Naval Postrgraduate School.
