= Afghan Women's Council =

The Afghan Women's Council (AWC) is a non-governmental, non-profit, and non-sectarian charitable organization that was established in 1986 with the primary objective of providing assistance to Afghan women and children. The organization's core mission is to empower women, enhance their living conditions, and bolster their socio-economic standing within society through active participation in various development initiatives. They also hope to increase awareness of human rights, women's rights, refugee rights, children's rights, peace-building and democracy issues within the Afghan context. The AWC is duly registered with both the Government of Pakistan and the Government of Afghanistan as a charitable non-governmental organization (NGO).

== Foundation ==
The origin of the Afghan Women's Council was the Democratic Women's Organisation of Afghanistan, which was founded in 1965. It was affiliated with the People's Democratic Party of Afghanistan (PDPA). During the Communist regime, women's rights were supported by the Societ backed Communist regime. This policy was supported by the Democratic Women's Organisation of Afghanistan. When the Soviet Union retracted its support to the Afghan Communist regime, the Afghan government felt a need to make women's rights less political.

In 1990, Najibullah abolished the Democratic Women's Organisation of Afghanistan and replaced it with the Afghan Women's Council, which was a more apolitic organization.

== Leadership ==
During the late 1980s, the council was led by Masuma Esmati-Wardak, who emphasized that the AWC's principal objectives include raising women's consciousness, making them aware of their rights, and improving women's living conditions and professional skills. Since its inception in 1986, the AWC has been actively engaged in a range of initiatives aimed at supporting Afghan refugees in Peshawar, Pakistan. Furthermore, the organization has been operating a hospital in Kabul since 1992, providing critical healthcare services to the community. The AWC holds official registrations with key government bodies and international organizations, including the Ministry of Planning, the Ministry of Education, the Ministry of Women Affairs, the United Nations Development Programme, the United Nations Office for Partnerships, and the World Food Program, as an Afghan NGO. Additionally, it is registered with the Ministry of Justice as a recognized social organization.

Along with Wardak, the AWC was also ran by a staff of eight women. Some of these staff members were also members of the People's Democratic Party of Afghanistan (PDPA). When the communist regime began in 1978, under Nur Muhammad Taraki, the government gave equal rights to women. This allowed women the ability to make decisions regarding their own lives.

This was a significant regime, as human rights for all people in Afghanistan, and specifically for women, can only be ensured through democracy.

However, the history of Afghanistan's ongoing war has meant that many women continued to be excluded from the social, political, and economic areas of Afghan society. Afghan women continue to be excluded in decision-making processes due to ongoing social norms.

The current president of AWC, Fatana Ishaq Gailani, believes that Afghan women have suffered a great deal during this ongoing war. They have been killed, have lost their children and suffered much tribulation. Gailani has said that the AWC has "provided assistance to two thousand needy widows and orphans." Gailani has also expressed her belief in uniting Afghanistan as a country to bring women together and to recognize their rights: “We do not recognize north and south in Afghanistan. We recognize only one historical Afghanistan.”

== Attitudes towards gender roles in Afghanistan ==
When discussing attitudes towards gender roles in Afghanistan, there is a noticeable difference between men and women. Typically, men exhibit more traditional views compared to women. This variation is evident regardless of whether the focus is on basic women's rights or their political empowerment. However, it's important to note that these attitudes are not fixed. Factors such as education level, ethnic background, and urban living can influence these views. Additionally, for women, changes across generations also play a role in shaping their perspectives on gender roles.

The journey of Afghan women towards suffrage and political involvement has been characterized by progress in a highly unstable sociocultural and political environment.

In a TOLO News interview with Taliban Spokesperson Sayed Zekrullah Hashimi in 2021, he mentioned that "a woman can't be a minister, it is like you put something on her neck that she can't carry. It is not necessary for women to be in the cabinet - they should give birth." When the interviewer countered "women are half of society", Hashimi replied with "But we do not consider them half. What kind of half? The half itself is misdefined here. The half means here that you keep them in the cabinet and nothing more. And if you violate her rights, not an issue."

A recent development with Gordon Brown and the International Criminal Court has enabled the Taliban to be prosecuted for crimes against humanity over the "systematic brutalization of women and girls" in Afghanistan.

This is a recent development that was implemented after the Taliban seized control of Kabul in August 2021. This led to the deterioration of human rights and the situation of women and girls in Afghanistan, despite the Taliban's initial promise to respect women's and girl's rights. This systematic oppression is part of a larger human rights crisis in Afghanistan, where the rights of various groups, including women protesters, girls’ students, teachers, and women's rights defenders, have been violated by the Taliban.

In response to these violations, the international community, led by the United Nations, is focusing on continued engagement with the Taliban. Roza Otunbayeva, the head of the UN Assistance Mission in Afghanistan, advocates for a "reframed engagement strategy," emphasizing that dialogue and engagement are essential for attempting to change these policies.

Sima Bahous, the head of the UN's gender equality agency, has highlighted the economic, mental health, and developmental crises stemming from the Taliban's decrees. She urges that the situation in Afghanistan should be primarily viewed through the lens of the women's rights crisis and recommends that the UN Security Council Committee overseeing sanctions against Afghanistan convene a session to address these violations.

== The importance of education ==
Over the past year, UN Women has engaged in a collaborative effort with UNAMA (United Nations Assistance Mission in Afghanistan) and IOM (International Organization for Migration) to conduct regular consultations with Afghan women residing within the country. The objective of this initiative is to place women at the forefront of international decision-making.

During the most recent quarter, women once again communicated with the council that their topmost priority is gaining access to education. Over four out of five young women and girls who should have the opportunity to pursue education are currently unable to do so. The long-term consequences of this situation cannot be overstated, as it not only affects the women and girls directly impacted but also has far-reaching repercussions on their families and communities.

Furthermore, according to the National Intelligence Council, approximately 3.5 million out of the 9 million Afghan citizens currently enrolled in educational institutions are female. Nevertheless, only 17 percent of rural girls have access to secondary education, in contrast to their urban counterparts, where 45 percent attend secondary school. Over 80 percent of Afghan women aged 15 and older lack basic literacy skills. The educational landscape in Afghanistan experienced significant growth post-2001, witnessing a more than tenfold increase in the number of schools. However, the ongoing rise in insecurity has led to the closure of many of these educational facilities in recent years.

== The AWC's development activities ==
The AWC actively encourages community participation in social and economic development through initiatives that involve beneficiaries in decision-making, planning, and project execution. Advisory Committees with diverse representation facilitate this engagement, and local employment ensures communities have a stake in program implementation.

=== 1. Education ===
The AWC offers expertise in a diverse range of areas, including literacy, mathematics, healthcare, parenting, conflict resolution, and many more. Furthermore, AWC specializes in community development, healthcare initiatives, alternative livelihood programs, and the development of small and medium-sized enterprises. Since its establishment in 1986, AWC has provided valuable education and support to thousands of Afghan women.

=== 2. Healthcare ===
Mother and Child Health Clinic: Commencing its services in 2000, the clinic extended support to approximately 25,000 impoverished families residing in the Shahrak Khurasan area of Kabul. It operated independently until 2002, without reliance on external donors. An 11-member team attends to the needs of 60-80 mothers and children daily, offering essential medical care, laboratory tests, and medications, all without financial compensation.

Psychosocial Support and Counselling: The AWC prioritizes psychosocial support, catering to individual and group needs. They focus on enhancing self-esteem and self-confidence, fostering improved interpersonal and intergroup relationships, and providing effective tools for managing stress, anger and grief.

=== 3. Relief and rehabilitation ===
In the past year, the AWC extended vital relief assistance to 1,000 women during the winter season and continued to support numerous individuals on a monthly basis. Since 2002, the AWC has executed a relief project that has benefitted 500 families, encompassing the provision of clean drinking water, essential shelter materials, and sustenance in Paktika and Parwan Provinces.

=== 4. Income generation ===
The AWC offers comprehensive training programs in a range of essential topics ranging from small business operations to vegetable gardening.

=== 5. Rights, peace and democracy ===
The AWC has been an advocate for Afghan women's rights, participating in global human rights, peace-building, and democracy events since 1933. As well as providing training in crucial areas, they also conduct seminars and workshops to raise awareness and unity among women, enabling them to assert their rights from family to government levels. The organization also encourages women to engage in political processes.

=== 6. International support ===
The AWC places a strong emphasis on the professional development of its staff members. The organization has sponsored select staff members to attend seminars and workshops in locations like New Delhi and Sri Lanka.

== See also ==
- Women's rights in Afghanistan
- Women's Welfare Association
- Democratic Women's Organisation of Afghanistan
