= Cambodian Women's Association =

Cambodian Organization for Women's rights

Cambodian Women's Association was a Cambodian women's rights organization, founded in 1949. It was the first women's organization in Cambodia, and are considered the starting point of the women's movement in Cambodia. It was founded by a group of educated upper class women in Phnom Penh.

The Cambodian Women's Association was founded by a circle of educated urban upper class women in Phnom Penh. The purpose was to expand women's rights and opportunities, which were limited at the time. The school system were largely restricted to males and the écoles franco-cambodgiennes and Manufacture Royale au Palais for girls only offered an education to domestics or manufacturer of tourist objects, and only a small minority upper class women had access to higher education at the Collège Sisowath (Lycée Sisowath) and from there to university abroad.

The Cambodian Women's Association was a moderate but liberal organization, who wished to expand women's opportunities and place in society without challenging the traditional women's role too much. The association worked for women's rights through various social works, and allied with the moderate state feminism of the era, when women where formally given access to higher education, professional life and appointed to political positions.

After the 1970 coup, Nou Neou was elected president of the Cambodian Women's Association and revitalized the organization. During the war against the Khmer Rouge, the Cambodian Women's Association, the Writer's Association and the Committee of Cambodian Patriots in Europe united in an appeal to protect the Angkor Wat temple complex from bombings. Nou Neou functioned as the president of both the Cambodian Women's Association and the Patriotic Women's Youth Commandos, and under her leadership, the organizations participated in the mobilization of women in the struggle against the Khmer Rouge; though the Cambodian Women's Association emphasized that this role was temporary and that women should return to their place as mothers when the war was won.

Cambodian Women's Association was abolished after the victory of the Khmer Rouge. It should not be confused with the Communist Women's Association, which played an important part during the Vietnamese occupation in 1979-89, when it enforced its women's policy through a representative in each village.
