= Saleha Farooq Etemadi =

Afghan politician

Minister of Social Security
- In office 1990-1992
- President: Mohammad Najibullah
- Premier: Fazal Haq Khaliqyar

Saleha Farooq Etemadi was an Afghan politician. She served as Minister of Social Security in 1990–1992.

In May 1990 she was appointed cabinet minister of Social Security in the government of Mohammad Najibullah.

She was one of two women in the cabinet alongside Masuma Esmati-Wardak, and one of the first women in the Afghan government. After the fall of the Communist regimen, no other woman was to be a member of Government in Afghanistan until Sima Samar in 2001.
