= Sibghatullah Mojaddedi =

Acting President of Afghanistan in April–June 1992

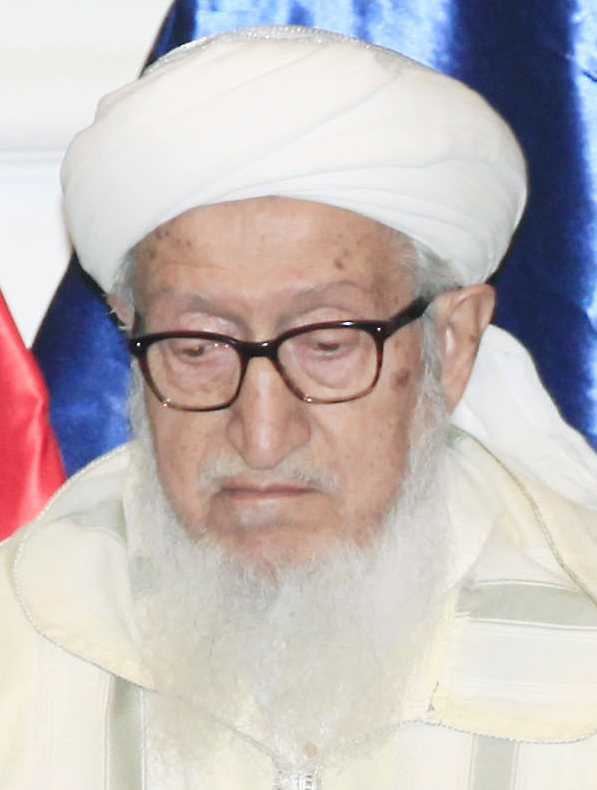
- Mojaddedi in 2014

Acting President of Afghanistan
- In office 28 April 1992 – 28 June 1992
- Preceded by: Mohammad Najibullah; Abdul Rahim Hatif (acting)
- Succeeded by: Burhanuddin Rabbani

Speaker of the House of Elders
- In office December 2005 – 29 January 2011
- Preceded by: Vacant
- Succeeded by: Fazel Hadi Muslimyar

Personal details
- Born: 27 September 1926 Kabul, Emirate of Afghanistan
- Died: 11 February 2019 (aged 92) Kabul, Islamic Republic of Afghanistan
- Occupation: Politician, Mujahideen leader

Sibghatullah Mojaddedi (Dari: صبغت‌الله مجددی; 27 September 1926 – 11 February 2019) was an Afghan politician, who served as Acting President after the fall of Mohammad Najibullah's government in April 1992. He was the first leader to call for armed resistance against the Soviet-backed regime in 1979 and founded the Afghan National Liberation Front (Jeebh-e Nejat-e Melli) at the time; later becoming a respected figure among the various Afghan mujahideen. He served as the chairman of the 2003 loya jirga that approved Afghanistan's new constitution. In 2005, he was appointed chairman of the Meshrano Jirga, upper house of the National Assembly of Afghanistan, and was reappointed as a member in 2011. He also served on the Afghan High Peace Council. Mojaddedi is considered to have been a moderate leader.

== Early years ==
Mojaddedi was born on 27 September 1926 in Kabul, Afghanistan. His family, the Mojaddedis, are a well-known Pashtun family of religious scholars from Kabul who trace their ancestry to Mujaddid Ahmad Sirhindi, a prominent 16th-century Islamic scholar and Naqshbandi Sufi.

Mojaddedi studied Islamic Law and Jurisprudence at al-Azhar University in Cairo, Egypt. In 1952 he returned to Afghanistan to teach in high schools and at Kabul University, where he became known as an advocate of Afghan political independence. In 1959 Mojaddedi was accused of conspiring against then Soviet Prime Minister Nikita Khrushchev and was imprisoned without trial until 1964. It is believed his leftist brother, Rahmatullah Mojaddedi, passed information to Babrak Karmal and in turn to the Daoud government that Sibghatullah planned to blow up a bridge in Kabul targeting the Soviet delegation's motorcade in a visit. After release, he was forced into exile for his outspoken comments regarding Soviet influence in Afghanistan. His period in exile was spent in several countries such as Denmark and Pakistan before his entry into Afghan politics.

== Afghan resistance ==
National Liberation Front Jeebh-e Nejat-e Melli
- Leader: Sibghatullah Mojaddedi
- Founder: Sibghatullah Mojaddedi
- Founded: 1979
- Dissolved: 1996
- Succeeded by: Northern Alliance
- Headquarters: Peshawar (originally)
- Ideology: Moderate Islamism; Islamic democracy Anti-communism; Anti-Taliban
- Political position: Centre-right
- Religion: Sunni Islam
- National affiliation: Peshawar Seven

Following the Saur Revolution in 1978, the new communist Khalq government killed Mojaddedi's brother and several of his relatives. During exile in Peshawar, Mojaddedi founded the Jebh-e-Nejat-e Melli (National Liberation Front) group. He was the first person to call for a nationwide jihad against the Democratic Republic of Afghanistan, on March 13, 1979. Throughout the Soviet-Afghan War he made many contributions for the Afghan mujahideen cause. His militia was most prominent in Kunar Province.

Mojaddedi's vision was an Islamic republic, possibly with a restored monarchy. He was opposed to Islamic fundamentalism and harbored friendly feelings towards the West.

In 1988, he was elected head of the Afghan Interim Government, based in Peshawar.

== Presidency (1992) ==
In April 1992, he was elected the chair of the Islamic Jihad Council that was set up to establish a post-Soviet Afghan government. He entered Kabul on 28 April amid a large crowd and assumed the new Islamic republic, and offered a general amnesty to all Afghans except the deposed President, Mohammad Najibullah, whose fate would be decided by "the public". His election was supported by all mujahideen guerilla factions except the Hezb-e Islami Gulbuddin, whose forces started firing rockets at the capital; violent clashes took place between them and soldiers of the new coalition near the Interior Ministry building. Mojadeddi pleaded with Gulbuddin Hekmatyar to lay down their arms, and commented "Mr. Hekmatyar was our brother. We were not expecting such an action. It is not allowed to him according to religion, according to Afghan tradition, to do this."

During the period that Mojaddedi was President of Afghanistan, the Ariana plane carrying him to Kabul was hit by an RPG as it was landing at Kabul International Airport. The plane landed safely, with no fatalities.

This position lasted for three months, although some sources say that he stayed in power for only two months. In May 1992, Burhanuddin Rabbani established a new leadership council, which undermined Mojaddedi's leadership, resulting in his resignation and handing over power to a new council.

== Later political career ==
After the fall of the Taliban in 2001, Mojaddedi returned to Afghanistan from Pakistan and became chairman of the 2003 loya jirga, the assembly which approved Afghanistan's new constitution. He caused controversy there by publicly calling Malalai Joya a "communist" and "infidel" after her speech, for which he later apologized. Amnesty International said that Mojaddedi and the jirga's leadership curtrailed freedom of speech at the assembly, including refusing to launch a vote on changing "Islamic Republic of Afghanistan" to "Republic of Afghanistan" despite getting enough signatures, publicly calling the delegates who signed it "unbelievers" and "apostates".

In 2005 he became chairman of the Meshrano Jirga, Afghanistan's upper house of the National Assembly of Afghanistan, and he was reappointed as member in 2011. He also served on the Afghan High Peace Council.

On 26 August 2015, Mojaddedi launched a new political coalition, the Council of Jihad and National Political Parties.

== Later life and death ==
=== 2006 Assassination Attempt ===
Two suicide bombers carried out an attack in Kabul on 12 March 2006 against Mojaddedi, while he was a member of the upper house and head of a reconciliation committee aimed at engaging former Taliban members. The attackers blew up a vehicle filled with explosives next to his car as he was being driven through the streets. Four pedestrians were killed and Mojaddedi was slightly injured, with burns to his face and hands.

=== Death ===
Mojaddedi was falsely reported to have died on 9 February 2016. He was subsequently reported to have been present at a ceremony commemorating the 27th anniversary of the Soviet withdrawal from Afghanistan on 15 February 2016. It was reported on 12 February 2019 that Mojaddedi had died. He was 92.

== Bibliography ==
- Eur (2003). Far East and Australasia 2003. Routledge. ISBN 1-85743-133-2.
- Gladstone, Gary (2001). Afghanistan: History, Issues, Bibliography. Novinka Books. ISBN 1-56033-105-4.
- Human Rights Watch (April 2007). "The Human Cost The Consequences of Insurgent Attacks in Afghanistan". 19 (6c). Human Rights Watch.
- Runion, Meredith L. (2007). The History of Afghanistan. Greenwood Press. ISBN 978-0-313-33798-7. OCLC 237144347.
- Stedman, Stephen John; Tanner, Fred (2002). Refugee Manipulation: War, Politics, and the Abuse of Human Suffering. Brookings Institution Press. ISBN 0-8157-8090-7. OCLC 123336516.

Political offices
Preceded by Abdul Rahim Hatef; Acting	President of Afghanistan; Acting; 1992	Succeeded by Burhanuddin Rabbani
