= Abdul Hadi Dawi =

Afghan poet, diplomat and government official

- عبدالهادی داوی

President of the Mesherano Jirga
- In office 1961–1973

Speaker of the House of the People
- In office 1949–1951

Afghan Ambassador to the United Kingdom
- In office 1922–1925
- In office 1929–1931

Minister of Commerce
- In office 1925–1928

Afghan Ambassador to Egypt
- In office 1952–1954

Afghan Ambassador to Indonesia
- In office 1954–1958

Personal details
- Born: 1894 Kabul, Emirate of Afghanistan
- Died: 1982 (aged 87–88) Kabul, Democratic Republic of Afghanistan
- Education: Habibia High School (1912)
- Occupation: Politician, diplomat, journalist
- Known for: Advocacy for Amanullah Khan

Abdul Hadi Dawi (Pashto: عبدالهادي داوي 1894 – 1982) was an Afghan poet, diplomat and government official. His poetry was published under his pen name, Pareshan (worried).

== Biography ==
Abdul Hadi Dawi was born to a Daavi Afghan family in 1894 in Kabul, Afghanistan. He graduated from Habibia High School in 1912. In 1919, Mahmud Tarzi turned over the editorship of Siraj al-Akhbar to him. Under Dawi's editorship, the name of the paper was changed to Aman-i Afghan (Afghan Peace).

In 1922, he was appointed as first ever Afghan Ambassador to London. From 1925 until his resignation in 1928, he served as a Minister of Commerce. After his resignation, he was again appointed as the Afghan Ambassador to London where he served from 1929 until 1931. He was imprisoned from 1933 until 1946 as a supporter of Amanullah Khan.

In 1950, Dawi was elected to the Afghan parliament and was appointed as the speaker of the House for term 1949–1951. During this time, he also served as secretary of King Mohammad Zahir Shah and tutor of the crown prince. He was appointed as ambassador to Cairo from 1952 to 1954, and to Jakarta from 1954 until 1958. In 1961, Zahir Shah appointed Abdul Hadi Dawi president of the Mesherano Jirga (House of Elders), and he was reappointed several times until the King was overthrown.

Abdul Hadi died in 1982 in Kabul.
