= Anahita Ratebzad =

Afghan socialist and Marxist-Leninist politician

- آناهیتا راتبزاد
- Ratebzad in 1980

Deputy Chairman of the Presidium of the Revolutionary Council
- In office 27 December 1980 – 24 November 1985
- President: Babrak Karmal

Member of the Politburo of the People's Democratic Party of Afghanistan
- In office 1979–1986

Member of the House of the People
- In office 1965–1969
- Constituency: Second District Kabul City

Afghan Ambassador to Yugoslavia
- In office July 1978 – 1980

Personal details
- Born: 1 November 1931 Guldara, Afghanistan
- Died: 7 September 2014 (aged 82) Dortmund, Germany
- Party: People's Democratic Party of Afghanistan
- Spouse: Keramuddin Kakar
- Children: 3
- Education: Michigan State University; Kabul University

Anahita Ratebzad (Pashto: آناهیتا راتبزاد; November 1931 – 7 September 2014) was an Afghan socialist and Marxist-Leninist politician and a member of the People's Democratic Party of Afghanistan (PDPA) (belonging to the Parcham faction) and vice-president of the Revolutionary Council under the leadership of Babrak Karmal. One of the first women elected to the Afghan parliament, Ratebzad was deputy head of state from 1980 to 1986.

== Early life and education ==
Ratebzad was born in Guldara in Kabul Province. Her father was a journalist and an advocate of Amanullah Khan's reforms. This led to his forced exile following the events of 1929 to Iran under the ruling period of Nader Khan. Ratebzad's father died during his exile in Iran, so she and her brother grew up without their father under poor conditions.

Ratebzad attended the francophone Malalaï Lycée school in Kabul. She received a degree in nursing from the Michigan State University's School of Nursing, studying from 1950 to 1954. As Kabul University's Medical School allowed women to study medicine, Ratebzad enrolled in 1957 and graduated in 1963.

Ratezbad was married at the age of 15 to Dr. Keramuddin Kakar, allegedly in compensation for medical bills. He was one of the few foreign-educated Afghan surgeons of the time. Her political involvement led to an estrangement between her and her husband, who did not approve of her political views and activities. He was considered loyal to Zahir Shah.

Ratebzad moved out of their marital home in 1973. Though they never divorced officially, they lived separately and avoided contact. They had three children, two sons and one daughter. Their daughter followed her political path and became a member of the People's Democratic Party of Afghanistan (PDPA).

== Political life ==
Ratebzad was one of the first publicly outspoken social and political Afghan-women activists in the late 1950s and most of 60s in Afghanistan. She was also part of the first ever Afghan-women delegation representing the Kingdom of Afghanistan on international stage at the Asian Women's Conference in Ceylon in 1957.

As veiling became optional during the tenure of Daud Khan as prime minister, Ratebzad led a group of female nurses in 1957 to Kabul's Aliabad Hospital to attend male patients. This marked the uncovering of women's faces for working purpose in urban Afghanistan. However, this and other events to follow led to her defamation in conservative circles of Afghan society.

Ratebzad founded the Democratic Organisation of Afghan Women (DOAW) in 1964 and served as its first president. The organisation did not follow a specific political ideology. In 2013 Rahnaward Zaryab wrote that "DOAW was an organisation founded in the 1340s (1960s CE) which was not foreign funded or supported. The members of the organisation were intellectual women volunteering to promote and work for women's rights on their own initiative." Comparing DOAW with present-day women's rights organisations inside Afghanistan, he added "they lack the outreach and effectiveness of DOAW." However, after the Saur Revolution of 1978, the organisation came under the supervision of the PDPA government. During the Khalq faction's power seizure it was headed by Dilaram Mahak from 1978 to 1979. After the power seizure by the Parcham faction, Ratebzad was elected as the chairwoman of DOAW at DOAW's general assembly in 1980.

Ratebzad along with other members of DOAW organised a protest march on 8 March 1965 in Kabul marking the first celebration of International Women's Day in Afghanistan.

She became involved in leftist politics and, along with Khadija Ahrari, Masuma Esmati Wardak, and Roqia Abubakr, was one of the first four women elected to Afghan parliament in 1965, winning the Second District Kabul City seat. In 1965, Ratebzad helped found the People's Democratic Party of Afghanistan (PDPA), becoming part of the Parcham faction. Ratebzad'a political views on women's rights and her Marxist political ideology made her a highly controversial figure, especially among other political parties and forces. Her close association with the communist politician and the leader of the Parcham faction, Babrak Karmal (whom she had an affair with according to the Soviet archivist Vasili Mitrokhin), brought her the label of "Karmal's mistress." Their affair was an "open scandal," however some incorrect sources counted him as her husband. Ratebzad did not contest the 1969 Afghan parliamentary elections, losing her seat in parliament.

In the days leading to the Saur Revolution/Coup d'état on 28–29 April 1978, Ratebzad was detained under house arrest in her apartment in Makroyan, while Karmal Ghulam Dastagir Panjsheri, Nur Muhammad Taraki and Saleh Mohammad Zeary were imprisoned and other PDPA prominent members (Khalq and Parcham) had gone underground. As the Khalq wing of PDPA seized power and Taraki became president, she was appointed as Minister of Social Affairs. She served at the post for four months. She was the only female member of the post-coup cabinet.

Ratebzad wrote the 28 May 1978 Kabul New Times editorial which declared: "Privileges which women, by right, must have are equal education, job security, health services, and free time to rear a healthy generation for building the future of the country ... educating and enlightening women is now the subject of close government attention."

The two factions of Khalq and Parcham soon fell out again and prominent Parchamites, including Ratebzad and Mohammad Aslam Watanjar, were appointed as ambassadors. Ratebzad served as ambassador to Belgrade, Yugoslavia (1978– 1980), becoming the first woman ambassador appointed by her country. She was dismissed from her post when Hafizullah Amin came to power, who also launched a purge on Parchamites.

After the Soviet invasion of Afghanistan and power seizure by the Parcham wing, Ratebzad was appointed as Minister of Education (1980–1981) and became permanent member of the PDPA's Politburo. In this position she had the responsibility of overseeing several Ministries, including Higher and Vocational Education, Information and Cultural, and Public Health. From 27 December 1980 Ratebzad was the Deputy Chairman of the Presidium of the Revolutionary Council.

After Karmal was replaced by Mohammad Najibullah in 1986, who aimed at distancing himself from his leftist past and Marxist rhetoric upon Soviet advice, Ratebzad was discharged of her posts and withdrew from the Politburo. She was replaced as head of DOAW by Firuzah Wardak.

== Migration, later life and death ==
After 1986 she remained in Afghanistan until May 1992. Ratebzad and some members of her family were forced to escape the Mujahideen in-fighting. In 1995 she left for Sofia, Bulgaria, and a year later after seeking political asylum, settled in Lünen, Germany.

Ratebzad died of kidney failure in September 2014, at the age of 82. Her remains were taken back to Afghanistan and were buried in Kabul's Shohada-e-Sa'alehin.
