= Shafiqa Ziaie =

Afghan educator and cabinet minister

Minister without Portfolio
- In office 1971–1973
- President: Mohammed Daoud Khan

Advisor, Ministry of Planning
- Incumbent
- Assumed office 1972

Minister of State for Women's Affairs
- Incumbent
- Assumed office 1976
- Succeeded by: Sima Samar

Personal details
- Born: 1928 (age 97–98) Kabul
- Education: Malalai High School, Women's College
- Occupation: Educator, politician

Shafiqa Ziaie or Shafiqa Ziaye (born 1928) was an Afghan educator and cabinet minister. She belonged to the generation of pioneer women who attained public positions in Afghan society after the reforms of Mohammed Daoud Khan.

== Life ==
She was born in Kabul.

She was orphan, but completed her studies up to the 8th grade, which was not a given thing in Afghanistan, where most women did not attend school at all. She left school to take care of her two brothers and a sister, but still managed to take her annual exam and graduate from Malalay High School and attend Women's College.

She worked as an inspector of girls' schools. In 1960–1961, she studied French and Administration in Switzerland.

She served as Minister without Portfolio in 1971–1973. She was the second woman to become a member of the Afghan government.

She was named Advisor for the Ministry of Planning in 1972.

She was appointed Minister of state for Women's Affairs in 1976. No other woman was to be appointed to this post until the post was reinstated by the appointment of Sima Samar in 2001.
