= Democratic Women's Organisation of Afghanistan =

Women's organisation in Afghanistan

The Democratic Women's Organisation of Afghanistan (DOAW) (Sazman-e Zanan-e Dimukratik-e Afghanistan) was a women's organisation in Afghanistan, founded in 1965. It was a component of the People's Democratic Party of Afghanistan (PDPA). It played a significant part in the history of the women's movement in Afghanistan, and replaced the Women's Welfare Association as the dominant organization of the Afghan women's movement during the communist era of the 1970s and 1980s. During the Communist era, it was the spokes organ of the government's radical women's rights policy.

== Foundation ==
The DOAW was founded in 1965 in Kabul by Anahita Ratebzad, Soraya Parlika, Kobra Ali, Hamideh Sherzai, Momeneh Basir and Jamileh Keshtmand. Anahita Ratebzad served as the president of the organization in 1965–1986.

== Prior to 1978 ==
When the DOAW was founded, the Women's Welfare Association was the biggest women's organization in Afghanistan, but the DOAW gradually came to replace it, and had a far more radical agenda.

The DOAW organised women in support and defense of women's rights, which were incorporated in the constitution of 1964. They also organised demonstrations of women in support of women's rights, which were the first time this happened in Afghanistan.

In 1968, when conservative members of parliament suggested that women should be banned from studying abroad, the DOAW organized a protest, pointing out that this was banned in the constitution. Their protest resulted in the suggested law being retracted by parliament.

In 1970, several attacks occurred in Kabul, were fundamentalist mullahs condemned women walking in the streets unveiled and dressed in modern Western clothing, and unveiled women wearing shorts and mini skirts were attacked by men, some throwing acid at them. The DOAW organized a mass protest of 5000 women, demanding the investigation and arrest of those responsible, resulting in both arrests and investigation of the attacks.

== Communist era ==
When the PDPA took power after the Saur Revolution of 1978, DOAW came to have an important role in the Democratic Republic of Afghanistan (DRA). Anahita Ratbzad announced that the DOAW's primary goal was to fight against feudalism and Western imperialism in defense of the principles of the "Saur Revolution." Between 1979 and 1980 it was called People's Organization of Afghan Women (KOAW).

It published its own monthly journal, Zanan-i-Afghanistan (Women of Afghanistan). It launched a literacy campaign to make education available to women of all ages and classes, rural as well as urban, and to inform them of the objectives of the Saur Revolution.

In 1981 the DOAW had local offices in nineteen districts, seven municipal committees and 209 primary organizations, whose main function was to attract women to the party through the organization in support of revolution.

During the Communist era, women's rights were supported by both the Afghan government as well as by the Soviets who supported them. In contrast to what had been the case during the monarchy, when women's rights had been restricted to urban elite women, the Communists attempted to extend women's rights to all classes of society, also to rural women and girls.

The communist government's ideological enforcement of female emancipation in the rural areas took the form of enforced literacy campaigns for women and compulsory schooling for girls, which was heavily resisted in particularly the Pashtun tribal areas. In rural Afghanistan, gender seclusion was a strong part of local culture. To attend school girls would have to leave home, and school was therefore seen as a deeply dishonorable thing. The policy of compulsory schooling for girls as well as boys was met with a strong backlash from the conservative rural population, and contributed to the resistance against the Soviets and the Communist regime by the Mujahideen, the Islamic guerillas. The conservative rural population came to regard the urban population as degenerate partially because of the female emancipation, in which urban women mixed with men and participated in public life unveiled, and education for women, and by extension women's rights in general, came to be associated with Communism and atheism.

During the Communist regime, thousands of urban women were recruited to the cadres and militias of the PDPA party and the Democratic Women's Organisation of Afghanistan, and trained in military combat against the Mujahideen, the Islamic guerillas, and there was a concern among urban women that the reactionary fundamentalists would topple the Communist regime and the women's rights it protected.

== Dissolution ==
When Najibullah came to power in 1986, he eradicated the Marxist rhetoric of the DOAW in order to lessen conservative Islamic opposition to the PDPA regime and women's rights, and the organization's name was changed from Sazman-i-Democratic-i-Zanan-i-Afghanistan (Democratic Organization of Afghan Women) to Shura-i-Sarasari-Zanan-i-Afghanistan (All Afghanistan Women's Council). Ratebzad was replaced by Firuza Wardak as president of the organization.

In 1990, Najibullah abolished the Democratic Women's Organisation of Afghanistan and replaced it with the Afghan Women's Council, which was a more apolitic organization.
