= Ministry of Planning =

Ministry of Planning may refer to:

- Ministry of Planning (Bangladesh)
- Ministry of Planning, Budget, and Management, Brazil
- Ministry of Planning (Cambodia)
- Ministry of Planning and External Cooperation (Haiti)
- Ministry of Planning (India)
- Ministry of Planning (Iraq)
- Ministry of Planning Development & Special Initiatives (Pakistan)
- Ministry of Planning and International Cooperation (Palestine)
- Ministry of Planning (Puntland)
- Ministry of Planning and International Cooperation (Somalia)
- Ministry of Planning and International Cooperation (Yemen)
