= Dawi =

Pashtun tribe

Dawi (Pashto:دعوه) (also spelled as Davi, Daavi or Daway) is a Gharghasht Pashtun tribe and the brother of the Kakar tribe.

== Sub-tribes ==
- Hamar (همر)
- Dummar (دومړ)
- Ab Ul Maali (ابوالمعالي)
- Khondai (خوندی)(also spelled as Khujandi خجندي) adopted son of Sayed.
