= Nizoramo Zaripova =

Soviet politician (1923–2024)

- Низорамоҳ Зарифова
- Born: Nizoramo Odinovna Kasyma; 6 November 1923; Kulab Region, Turkestan ASSR, Russian SFSR, USSR (now Tajikistan)
- Died: November 2024 (aged 101); Dushanbe, Tajikistan
- Occupations: Politician, women's rights activist
- Years active: 1945–1989

Nizoramo Odinovna Zaripova (Tajik: Низорамоҳ Одинаевна Зарифова; 6 November 1923 – November 2024) was a Soviet politician and women's rights advocate. She headed the Women's Department of the Communist Party of Tajikistan from 1947 to 1956 and then became a Secretary of the Party between 1956 and 1966. In 1966, she was elected as Deputy Chair of the Presidium of the Supreme Soviet of the Tajik Soviet Socialist Republic. During her tenure, through to 1989, she stepped into the Chair of the Presidium between January and February 1984, as acting head of state of the Tajik SSR.

== Early life ==
Zaripova was born on 6 November 1923 in the village of Pusheni in the Kulab Region. Her father was a poor farmer, Odin Kasym, who died when she was five years old. Her mother raised Kasyma, along with her brother and three sisters alone, but their brother died when Kasyma was thirteen. To make ends meet, the family worked on the collective farm, picking cotton and mowing grass, when the girls were not in school. When their mother remarried, as she was grateful to their new stepfather, Kasyma took his surname, Zaripova. In 1937, Zaripova was sent by the district authorities to begin her studies at the Women's Pedagogical School in Stalinabad, but as her parents were not able to pay her expenses, she withdrew in 1940 and returned home. Enrolling in the Kulob Pedagogical School, she graduated at the beginning of World War II.

== Career ==
Hired by the Komsomol committee, during the war, Zaripova visited collective farms and distributed rations to the fieldworkers. In 1945, she was promoted to head the Department of the Kulyab Regional Committee of the Tajik Komsomol. Between 1947 and 1952, she headed the Women's Work Department of the Kulyab Regional Committee.

In 1952, she was approached by the party leadership to go to Moscow to take courses at the Higher Party School. Though she did not want to go, because she had married Zuhursho Rahmatulloev and the couple had children, she knew she had no choice. Six months into her studies in Moscow, she was offered the position by Bobojon Ghafurov to head the Women's Department for the Central Committee of the Party. She agreed to take up the post when she finished her courses in six months.

At the end of the year, Zaripova returned to Stalinabad, though her family was living in Kulob and worked for one year before returning to Moscow to complete her studies at the Higher Party School in 1954. She returned upon completion of her studies to Stalinabad and resumed her work as head of the Women's Department. In 1956, Zaripova was promoted as a Secretary of the Tajik Communist Party, serving in the post until 1966. Simultaneously, she served as a member of the Presidium of the Supreme Soviet of the Tajik SSR through 1963. She was a Deputy to the Supreme Soviet of the Soviet Union in 1958, was re-elected to the post in 1962, and in 1964 served as the head of the Ideological Department of the Tajik Communist Party.

Committed to improving the lives of women and girls, Zaripova introduced measures in the 1960s to establish quotas for women to attend university. She also pressed for the establishment of secondary schools for girls in rural villages, as well as the founding of a medical college in the Shahritus District. Zaripova often toured remote collective farms and inspected the conditions both inside the Tajik SSR and in the other Soviet Republics. After one trip to the Turkmen SSR, where she noted that each collective there had a woman as vice chair of the collective, she returned and proposed a similar policy for the Tajik SSR. The policy was adopted and as a result, 480 women were placed in leadership positions. She was a member of the Soviet Women's Committee and the attended congresses of the Women's International Democratic Federation.

In 1966, Zaripova became the Deputy Chair of the Presidium of the Supreme Soviet of the Tajik SSR, serving under chair Makhmadullo Kholov. She served as Deputy Chair until 1985, and during this time, between January and February 1984, was the acting chair, effectively the head of state of the Tajik SSR. After her retirement, Zaripova continued to be involved in women's issues, working with various NGOs to improve health services and opportunities for women's business and entrepreneurship. She was made an honorary member of the Tajik Committee on Women's Affairs and served on the Council of Elders.

Her death at the age of 101 was announced on 30 November 2024.
