= Suad Khalil Ismail =

Iraqi politician

Suad Khalil Ismail (1928–1995), was an Iraqi politician. She served as Minister of Higher Education in 1969–1972, and was the second woman to have served in the Iraqi Cabinet.
