= Khally Nazarova =

Soviet-Turkmenistani politician

Khally Nazarova was a Soviet-Turkmenistani politician.

She served as Deputy Minister of Public Service Turkmenian SSR in 1958–1959. She was the first woman cabinet minister in Turkmenistan. She served as Minister of Social Affairs in 1959–1962. She served as Deputy Premier Minister of the Turkmenian SSR in 1963–1965.
