= Zuleikha Ismail kyzy Huseynova =

Zuleikha Huseynova
- Züleyxa Hüseynova

Chairman of the Azerbaijan Trade Unions Council
- In office 1 June 1970 – 23 January 1981
- Preceded by: Gudret Dadshov
- Succeeded by: Lidiya Rasulova

Minister of Higher and Specialized Secondary Education of the Azerbaijan SSR
- In office 20 October 1965 – 30 June 1970
- Preceded by: the committee has been transformed into a ministry
- Succeeded by: Danil Guliyev

Chairman of the Committee for Higher and Specialized Secondary Education of the Council of Ministers of the Azerbaijan SSR
- In office 28 May 1963 – 20 October 1965
- Preceded by: Abdulla Garayev
- Succeeded by: the committee has been transformed into a ministry

Personal details
- Born: 29 May 1924 (age 102) Baku
- Died: 24 May 1996 (aged 71) Baku
- Party: Communist Party of the Soviet Union
- Education: Azerbaijan Industrial Institute
- Awards: Order of the October Revolution Order of the Red Banner of Labour

Zuleikha Ismail kyzy Huseynova (1924–1996) was a public and state official, a nominee of technical sciences, professor, Minister of Higher and Secondary Specialized Education of the Azerbaijan SSR (1965–1970), Chairperson of the Azerbaijan Trade Union Council (1970–1981), deputy of the USSR Supreme Soviet (7th–8th convocations), and a member of the USSR Parliament Group Commission.

== Life ==
Zuleikha Huseynova was born on 29 May 1924, in Baku. She received her primary and secondary education at School No. 132 in Baku and later enrolled in the Faculty of Oil Mechanics at the Azerbaijan Industrial Institute in 1942. After completing her higher education, Zuleikha pursued her studies at the Energetics Institute named after Yesman as a postgraduate student.

== Career ==
After defending her candidate dissertation in 1953, she worked at the Azerbaijan SSR Academy of Sciences for six years. Later, she was appointed Deputy Director of the Science and Education Institutions Department of the Central Committee of the Azerbaijan Communist Party.

Zuleikha Huseynova was one of the key figures advocating for the creation of the Ministry of Higher and Secondary Specialized Education in Azerbaijan, merging higher and secondary specialized educational institutions under one umbrella. She repeatedly met with the leadership of the Ministry of Higher and Secondary Specialized Education in Moscow to argue for the necessity of establishing corresponding institutions in allied republics. As a result of her efforts, the Committee for Higher and Secondary Specialized Education was created under the Council of Ministers, and Zuleikha was appointed as Deputy Chairperson. In 1963 she was promoted to Chair of the Committee.

In July 1965 the Committee was transformed into the Ministry of Higher and Secondary Specialized Education of the Azerbaijan SSR, and Zuleikha Huseynova was appointed as its minister. During her tenure as minister, significant efforts were made to expand the higher education network in the republic and strengthen the material-technical base of schools. For example, under her initiative and support, four dormitories and an educational building for foreign students were constructed at the Azerbaijan Institute of Oil and Chemistry. Additionally, a branch of the Azerbaijan Institute of Oil and Chemistry was opened in Sumqayit, the country's second industrial city (which now operates as Sumqayit State University). The Kirovabad (now Ganja) Technical Institute was also established under her initiative.

From 1965 to 1970 Zuleikha Huseynova successfully served as Minister of Higher and Secondary Specialized Education. In 1970, on the initiative of Heydar Aliyev, she was elected Chairperson of the Azerbaijan Trade Union Council. From 1981 until her retirement, Zuleikha Huseynova worked as Director of the Department of Science, Technology, and Educational Institutions at the Council of Ministers of the Azerbaijan SSR. She authored numerous scientific articles and methodological works, including being one of the co-authors of the original high school textbook "Automobiles and Tractors". After retiring, she worked as a consultant-professor at the Department of Internal Combustion Engines at the Azerbaijan Technical University. Zuleikha Huseynova was elected as a deputy to the Supreme Soviet of the USSR (7th–10th convocations) and held positions such as Deputy Chairperson and Chairperson of the Permanent Commission of the Soviet Parliament, as well as Deputy Chairperson of the Committee for Friendship and Solidarity with Asian and African Countries.

== Awards ==
Zuleikha Huseynova's contributions were highly esteemed, and she was awarded the Orders of the October Revolution and the Red Banner of Labor, along with several medals and honorary diplomas.
