= Dolgor Puntsag =

Mongolian politician

Dolgor Puntsag was a Mongolian politician (Communist). She was the Minister of Health of the People's Republic of Mongolia from 1930.

Dolgor Puntsag belonged to a family of Shepherds. In 1930, the Seventh Great Hural Conference under took the decision to create the Health Ministry, which had not existed before. Prime Minister Tsengeltiin Jigjidjav appointed Dolgor Puntsag to the first Minister of Health, to head and organize the Ministry of Health. She was the first Health Minister in Mongolia. She was also the first woman government minister in Mongolia. She also belonged to the first female cabinet ministers in the world.
