= Tong Siv Eng =

Cambodian politician

Tong Siv Eng (31 October 1919 – 12 June 2001) was a Cambodian politician. She was the first female member of parliament, and the first female cabinet minister, in Cambodia.

== Life ==
She was the daughter of a school principal who encouraged her to study. As there were no secondary education for females in Cambodia, she was given a scholarship to study in Saigon. When she returned to Cambodia, she married the courtier Pung Peng Cheng in 1939. She was a tutor of the royal children, and she and her spouse came to be personal advisers of king Sihanouk.

In 1958, women suffrage was introduced in Cambodia. In the following elections the same year, Tong Siv Eng became the first and only woman elected to parliament. She served as state secretary in 1958–59, minister of Social Action in 1959–61, and minister of Health in 1963–68. Women were legally subservient to men in the Cambodian civil code of 1958, and there were only three other examples of women in higher positions in Cambodia during the 1960s: Tip Man (1962-66), the minister of education Diep Dinar (1966-70), and the Undersecretary of State for Tourism Nou Neou (1969-70).

Sihanouk described the attempted implementation of the government’s retraining programme for sex workers as follows:

"One day, Her Excellency luok jamdev Pung Peng Cheng [Tong Siv Eng], Minister of Social Action within the Royal Sangkum Reastr Niyum government, went to the prostitutes in order to tell them this: ‘Ladies, the profession that you follow, although officially recognised by the Sangkum Reastr Niyum national administration, is not at all honourable. It is time that you change your profession. With your agreement, I will contact the directors of our factories, textile factories in particular. Ladies, you will become honourable and respectable workers in our lovely factories.’ The prostitutes contacted, in all good faith, by Her Excellency Minister Pung Peng Cheng, responded: ‘Luok jamdev, look at our long nails, shaped, filed, and their beautiful varnishes of red, pink, and purple! Is it that our hands and our fingers, destined for a sensual profession, can reasonably be used for a profession as primitive, as strenuous as that of a worker in a textile factory, or any other?’"

Tong Siv Eng also served as editor of the Samlanh Neary ("Woman's Voice").

She left Cambodia after the coup of 1970. Tong Siv Eng played an important part in the peace negotiations, as she arranged the meetings between Sihanouk and Hun Sen in 1987 and 1988. She died of a heart attack on 12 June 2001, aged 81.
