= Nou Neou =

Cambodian politician

Nou Neou, also known as Mrs Ung Mung, was a Cambodian politician.

She was Undersecretary of State for Tourism in 1966–1970. As such she was one of the first women in Cambodia to be appointed to a senior political office, after Tong Siv Eng and Diep Dinar.

Nou Neou functioned as the president of both the Cambodian Women's Association and the Patriotic Women’s Youth Commandos in 1970-1975, and under her leadership, the organizations participated in the mobilization of women in the struggle against the Khmer Rouge; though the Cambodian Women’s Association emphasized that this role was temporary and that women should return to their place as mothers when the war was won.

Lon Nol gave her the task to negotiate with the Khmer Rouge in order to integrate them into the regular Cambodian army, but it proved to be impossible because they could not get the approval of the Cambodian Military Academy.
