= Homeira Seljuqi =

Afghan politician

Member of the Senate
- In office 1965–1973

Personal details
- Born: 1912; Kabul, Afghanistan
- Died: 1990

Homeira Malikyar Seljuqi (1912–1990) was an Afghan politician. Alongside Aziza Gardizi, she was one of the first two female Senators nominated in 1965.

== Biography ==
Seljuqi's father died when she was a young girl. After being sent to India for treatment for an illness, Seljuqi met her future husband Salihuddin Seljuk, an Afghan consul.

Following the 1965 parliamentary elections, the first in which women could vote and run for office, Seljuqi and Gardizi were appointed to the Senate by King Mohammed Zahir Shah, while four women were elected to the House of the People. She was reappointed to the Senate following the 1969 elections.

After the Saur Revolution in 1979, Seljuqi moved to India. She died in 1990.
