= Cho Kyung-hee =

South Korean politician (1918–2005)

Cho Kyung-hee (Korean: 조경희; Hanja: 趙敬姬; April 6, 1918 – August 5, 2005) was a South Korean politician.

She was appointed as Minister of the Second Ministry of Political Affairs in 1988, and was Secretary of State for Political Affairs from 1989 to 1990.
