= Aziza Gardizi =

Afghan politician

Member of the Senate
- In office 1965–1973

Aziza Gardizi was an Afghan politician. Alongside Homeira Seljuqi, she was one of the first two female Senators nominated in 1965.

== Biography ==
Following the 1965 elections, the first in which women could vote and run for office, Gardizi and Seljuqi were appointed to the Senate by King Mohammed Zahir Shah, while four women were elected to the House of the People. She was reappointed to the Senate following the 1969 elections.
