= Rima Khalaf =

United Nations Under-Secretary-General

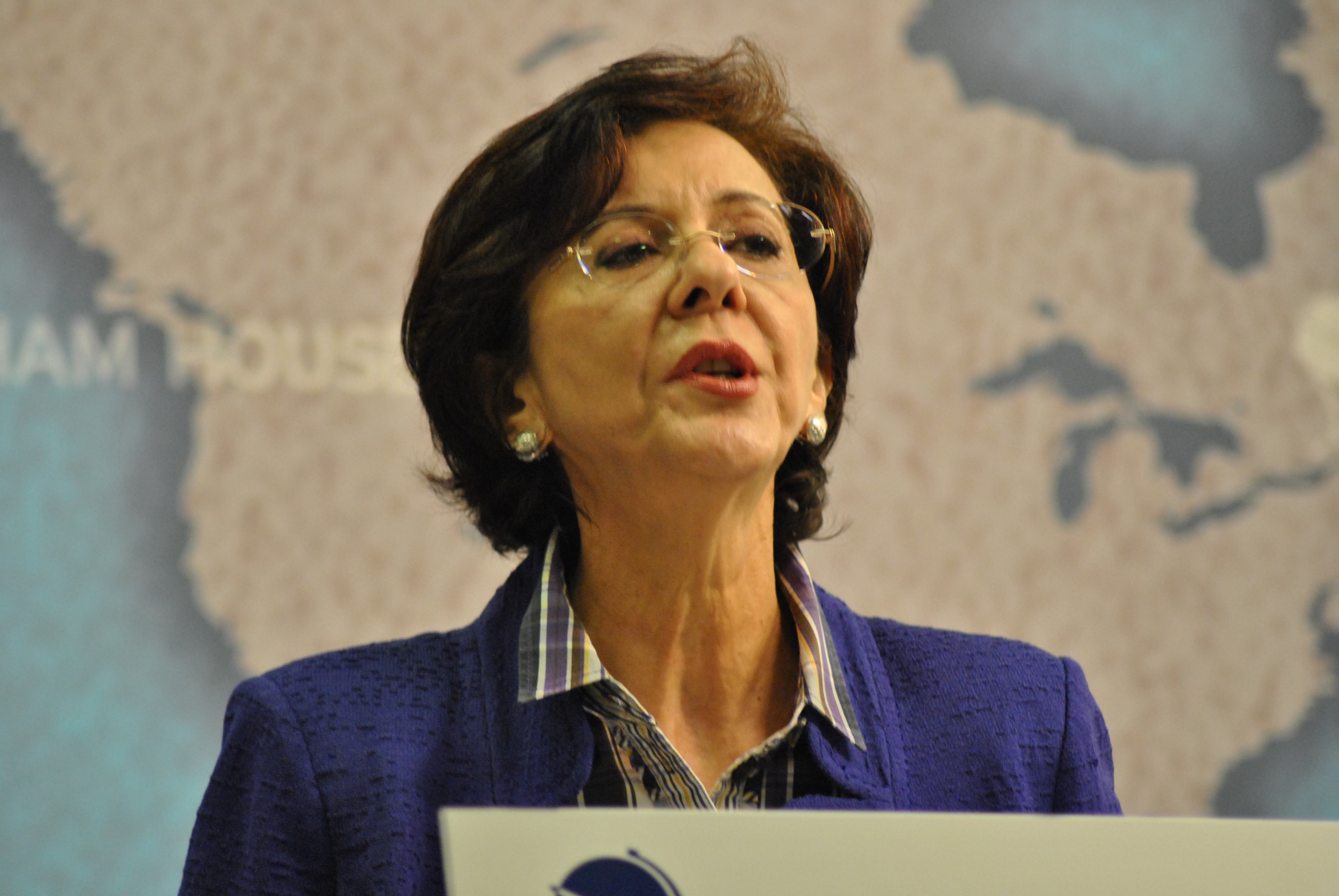
Rima Khalaf speaking at Chatham House in 2011

Rima Khalaf Hunaidi (Arabic: ريما خلف; born 1953, in Kuwait) is a national of Jordan who served as Executive Secretary of the United Nations Economic and Social Commission for Western Asia (ESCWA) from 2010 to 2017. She resigned from this position in March 2017, rather than comply with a request from the UN Secretary General António Guterres to withdraw a report that accused Israel of establishing an apartheid regime.

== Education ==
Khalaf holds a BA in Economics from the American University of Beirut and a Master's in Economics and a Ph.D in System Science from Portland State University in the United States of America.

== Career ==
=== Public service ===
Rima Khalaf Hunaidi held several high-ranking ministerial positions in Jordan, including:

- Minister of Industry and Trade (1993–1995).
- Minister of Planning (1995–1998).
- Deputy Prime Minister and Minister of Planning (1999–2000).

In her capacity as Deputy Prime Minister and head of the ministerial economic team, Khalaf promoted economic reform in Jordan while working on promoting social development through building human capital, alleviating poverty and strengthening social safety nets.

=== International forums for development ===
Khalaf held the position of Assistant Secretary-General and Director of the Regional Bureau for Arab States (RBAS) at the United Nations Development Programme (UNDP) from 2000 to 2006. She led important regional initiatives on education, knowledge acquisition and economic growth in the Arab States. She was the founder of the pioneering Arab Human Development Report. The first Report in the series, entitled "Creating Opportunities for Future Generations", received the 2003 Prince Claus Award. The third Report, entitled "Towards Freedom in the Arab World", received the King Hussein Leadership Prize in 2005.

Khalaf is a regular contributor to regional and international policy forums concerned with the state of development in the Arab world. She participated in a number of international commissions chief among them are the High Level Commission on the Modernization of the World Bank Group Governance (2008–2009), and the International Advisory Group for Managing Global Insecurity (2007–2008). Ms. Khalaf also served as the Chairperson of the Advisory Board of the United Nations Democracy Fund (2006–2007). She was a visiting scholar at Harvard University during the spring semester of 2009-2010.

Also in 2008-9 Khalaf served as the chief executive officer of the Mohammed bin Rashid Al Maktoum Foundation.

Khalaf served at the United Nations as Executive Secretary of the Economic and Social Commission for Western Asia (ESCWA) from 2010 to 2017.

==== UN controversy ====
On 17 March 2017, Rima Khalaf announced her resignation from her position at the UN saying the UN had pressured her to withdraw a report published by ESCWA, co-authored by Richard Falk, accusing Israel of establishing "an apartheid regime". The UN Secretary-General António Guterres requested the removal of the report from the UN website after previously distancing himself from it. United States UN ambassador Nikki Haley, commenting on the resignation, said: "When someone issues a false and defamatory report in the name of the UN, it is appropriate that the person resign." She had assisted in appointing Falk to write the report, and defend its contents.

Israel described her as an anti-semite. "A few weeks ago ... together with our American friends, we made clear that Rima Khalaf, an anti-Semite, a promoter of BDS, will not be tolerated in the halls of the UN", Israel's ambassador to the UN, Danny Danon, told attendees at the UN. However, Khalaf has dismissed previous Israeli allegations of anti-Semitism and has stood by the report.

== Other activities ==
- International Crisis Group (ICG), Board of Trustees (since 2023)

== Awards ==
Khalaf received the League of Arab States award for "the Most Distinguished Arab Woman in the Field of International Organizations" in 2005 and an Honorary Degree of Doctor of Humane Letters from the American University of Cairo in 2009, in recognition of her "important regional initiatives in education, women's rights, civic engagement and economic growth". In December 2009, the Financial Times listed Khalaf among the top fifty people who shaped the decade.

== Personal life ==
A Jordanian citizen, Khalaf is married and has two children.
