= Kubra Noorzai =

Afghan politician

Minister of Public Health
- In office 1965–1969

Member of the Loya Jirga
- In office 1977

Personal details
- Born: 1932 Kabul, Afghanistan
- Died: 1986 (aged 53–54) Kabul, Afghanistan

Kubra Noorzai (Pashto: کبرا نورزۍ) (1932–1986) was an Afghan politician. She was the first woman to become a government minister in the country, serving as Minister of Public Health between 1965 and 1969.

== Biography ==
Noorzai was born in Kabul, one of nine children. She was educated at the Lycée Malalaï, before graduating from the College of Science at Kabul University. Noorzai subsequently returned to Lycée Malalaï, becoming its headteacher and later headed the Women's Faculty at Kabul University. In 1958 she moved to France, where she studied at the University of Paris for a year.

She worked as a school inspector for girls schools, and served as director of the Feminine Charitable Institute in Kabul. She also became Dean of the College of Home Economics.

One of the leading feminists in Afghanistan, Noorzai was one of the first women to stop wearing a veil in public, after Queen Humaira Begum had set the example by appearing without hers in 1959. She was an Afghan delegate at UNESCO and the International Women's Congress meeting in Dublin. In 1964 King Mohammed Zahir Shah appointed her to an advisory committee that reviewed the draft 1964 constitution, which granted women the right to vote and stand for election.

Following the August–September 1965 elections, she was appointed Minister of Public Health by Prime Minister Mohammad Hashim Maiwandwal on 1 December 1965, becoming the first women minister in Afghanistan. She remained in office until 1969.

As director of the Women's Institute, she was elected to the Loya Jirga in 1977 during the rule of President Mohammed Daoud Khan.

Never married, she died at her home in the Kārte Seh neighbourhood of Kabul in 1986.
