= Ibodat Rakhimova =

Ibodat Rakhimova was a Soviet-Tajikistani politician.

She served as Deputy President of the Supreme Soviet of the Tajikistan Soviet Socialist Republic in 1955–1966. She served as Secretary of the Communist Party Central Committee Department of Propaganda and Agitation in 1966–1978. She served as Secretary of the Supreme Soviet of the Tajikistani SSR in 1985–1988.
