= Maryam Tugambayeva =

Soviet Kyrgyz politician

Chairman of the Supreme Soviet of the Kirghiz Soviet Socialist Republic
- In office 1937–1937

Maryam Tugambayeva (1907–1986), was a Soviet Kyrgyz politician.

She was Chairman of the Supreme Soviet of the Kirghiz Soviet Socialist Republic in 1937.

Her office as Chairman of the Supreme Soviet nominally made her "Head of the Republic" in 1937.
