= Constitution of Afghanistan =

Governing system of Afghanistan

Overview
- Original title: د افغانستان اساسي قانون
- Jurisdiction: Afghanistan
- Created: 1923
- Date effective: 1923
- System: Constitutional law

Government structure
- Branches: Various historical systems
- Chambers: Various historical legislatures
- Executive: Monarchic, republican, socialist, and Islamic systems
- Judiciary: Supreme Court of Afghanistan
- Federalism: No
- Entrenchments: Multiple historical constitutions
- First legislature: Various
- Author: Various constitutional commissions
- Signatories: Various Afghan governments

The Constitution of Afghanistan (Note: (Persian: قانون اساسی افغانستان, romanized: Qānūn-e Asāsī-ye Afġānistān; Dari: د افغانستان اساسي قانون, romanized: Da Afġānistān Asāsī Qānūn)) refers to the series of foundational legal documents that have governed the state structure, political system, and civil rights in Afghanistan throughout its modern history. Afghanistan has adopted multiple constitutions under monarchic, republican, communist, Islamic, and Taliban administration. Afghanistan's constitutional development began during the reign of King Amanullah Khan in the early twentieth century and continued through successive governments until the collapse of the Islamic Republic in 2021.

The most recent constitution was the 2004 constitution, adopted after the fall of the Taliban regime and backed by a constitutional loya jirga. Since the Taliban's return to power in 2021, the country's constitutional status has remained unknown, and the Ministry of Justice has categorized previous Afghan constitutions as "nullified constitutions".

== History ==
=== 1909 Constitutional movement (Mashrutiyat) ===
The first attempt at a constitution in Afghanistan was in March 1909 by the Afghan constitutionalist (Mashrutiyat) movement, a coalition of Islamic scholars (ulama), educators, and intellectuals petitioned the then Emir of Afghanistan, Habibullah Khan, who urged the transition from an absolute monarchy to a constitutional monarchy. Penned by the scholar Sarwar Wasif, the petition functioned as the core manifesto of the Mashrutiyat movement. Viewing it as a threat to his authority, Habibullah accused the signatories of conspiring to assassinate him, subsequently executing seven leaders and imprisoning the remaining members.

=== 1923 constitution ===
Afghanistan's first modern constitution titled the Nizamnama-yi Asasi-yi Dawlat-i Aliyya-yi Afghanistan (Basic Regulations of the Supreme State of Afghanistan), was established in 1923 during the reign of King Amanullah Khan. Influenced by reforms in the Ottoman Empire and other Muslim states, it introduced limited civil rights, administrative reforms, and centralized governance. It also declared Islam the state religion while attempting to modernize the Afghan state apparatus.

=== 1931 Constitution ===
A revised constitution was introduced in 1931 under King Mohammed Nadir Shah after the overthrow of Amanullah Khan. The 1931 constitution strengthened the monarchy and established a bicameral legislature while focusing on Hanafi Islamic jurisprudence as a legal foundation.

=== 1964 Constitution ===
The 1964 constitution, established by King Mohammed Zahir Shah, is widely regarded as Afghanistan's most liberal and influential constitutional document. Drafted by a constitutional commission and approved by a loya jirga, it established a constitutional monarchy, separation of powers, an independent judiciary, and an elected parliament.

The constitution prohibited members of the royal family from holding political office except for the monarch, introduced limited democratic reforms, and guaranteed certain civil liberties including freedom of expression and equality before the law.

Political parties, however, were not formally legalized under the constitution. The 1964 constitution remained in force until the monarchy was overthrown in 1973 by the then former Prime Minister Mohammad Daoud Khan.

=== Republican and communist constitutions ===
Following the abolition of the monarchy, President Mohammad Daoud Khan introduced the 1977 constitution, which nominally established Republic of Afghanistan (1973–1978) and granted significant powers in the executive branch. However, it never entered into force.

After the 1978 Saur Revolution led by the People's Democratic Party, Afghanistan underwent several constitutional changes under communist rule. The 1980 provisional constitution and the 1987 constitution sought to legitimize the socialist government while gradually incorporating Islamic references and multiparty provisions amid the Soviet–Afghan War.

In 1990, President Mohammad Najibullah introduced another constitution that removed explicit references to communism and renamed the country the Republic of Afghanistan in an attempt at national reconciliation.

=== Taliban era ===
After the Taliban captured Kabul in 1996, the Islamic Emirate of Afghanistan governed largely through decrees and interpretations of Islamic law rather than a fully codified constitution. Taliban authorities reportedly relied in part upon the 1964 constitution insofar as its provisions did not conflict with their interpretation of sharia.

Following the United States invasion in 2001 and the establishment of the Afghan Interim Administration, a new constitution was drafted with international support. The 2004 constitution was adopted by a constitutional loya jirga in January 2004.

The 2004 Constitution established Afghanistan as an Islamic republic with a presidential system. It guaranteed fundamental rights, recognized equal rights for men and women, and created a bicameral National Assembly consisting of the House of the People (Wolesi Jirga) and House of Elders (Meshrano Jirga). It also recognized Islam as the state religion while protecting limited religious freedoms for non-Muslims.

Under the constitution, no law could contravene the beliefs and provisions of Islam. The constitution also recognized multiple languages, including Dari and Pashto as official languages.

=== 2021–present ===
After the Taliban captured Kabul in August 2021 and the restoration of Taliban rule, the constitutional status of Afghanistan became unclear. Taliban announced that aspects of the 1964 constitution could temporarily remain applicable provided they did not contradict Islamic law or Taliban policies. In practice, Afghanistan has since been governed primarily through decrees issued by the Taliban leadership and religious authorities.

== Influences ==
Afghanistan's constitutional development suggested a combination of political traditions and foreign legal influences. The 1923 Constitution established during the reign of King Amanullah Khan was influenced by contemporary constitutional reforms in the Ottoman Empire and other Islamic modernist movements, particularly in relation to administrative centralization, legal codification, and state modernization.

The 1964 Constitution incorporated elements associated with European constitutional monarchies, including separation of powers, parliamentary governance, and judicial independence, while preserving the constitutional role of Islam.

Constitution adopted following the Saur Revolution in 1978 suggested Soviet and Marxist–Leninist political influence under the rule of the People's Democratic Party of Afghanistan. Subsequent constitution adoption during the presidency of Mohammad Najibullah incorporated Islamic provisions and limited multiparty participation as part of the government's national reconciliation policy.

The 2004 Constitution was drafted following the Bonn Agreement with support from the United Nations. It combined elements of Islamic constitutionalism with republican and democratic institutions, including a presidential system, bicameral legislature, and an independent judiciary.

== List of constitutions ==
Constitution	Adopted	Government form	Notes
1923 Constitution	1923	Monarchy	First modern constitution established under King Amanullah Khan titled Nizamnama-yi Asasi-yi Dawlat-i Aliyya-yi Afghanistan.
1931 Constitution	1931	Monarchy	Established a centralized monarchy under Mohammed Nadir Shah
1964 Constitution	1964	Constitutional monarchy	Introduced parliamentary institutions, judicial reforms, and civil liberties
1977 Constitution	1977	Republic	Established presidential republic under Mohammad Daoud Khan
1980 Constitution	1980	Socialist republic	Interim constitutional framework adopted after the Saur Revolution
1988 Constitution	1987	Democratic Republic	Introduced limited multiparty reforms during Mohammad Najibullah's presidency
1990 Constitution	1990	Republic	Removed explicit Marxist–Leninist references and renamed the state the Republic of Afghanistan
2004 Constitution	2004	Islamic Republic	Adopted by the constitutional Loya Jirga following the Bonn agreement
