= Masuma Esmati-Wardak =

Afghan politician (1930–2016)

Minister of Education
- In office 1990-1992
- President: Mohammad Najibullah
- Premier: Fazal Haq Khaliqyar

Member of the House of the People
- In office 1965–1969
- Constituency: Kandahar

Personal details
- Born: 1930
- Died: 22 August 2016 (aged 85–86)

Masuma Esmati-Wardak (1930 – 22 August 2016) was an Afghan writer and politician. She was jointly one of the first women to serve in the Afghan parliament in 1965, and served as Minister of Education in 1990–1992.

== Life and career ==
In 1953 she graduated from Kabul Women's College, and received a degree in business in the United States in 1958.

In 1959, she and Kubra Noorzai became one of the first women to appear in public in Afghanistan without a veil after Queen Humaira Begum had removed hers, supporting the call by the Prime minister Mohammed Daoud Khan for women to voluntary remove their veil.

In 1964 King Mohammed Zahir Shah appointed her to an advisory committee that reviewed the draft 1964 constitution, which granted women the right to vote and stand for election. In 1965 she was elected to represent Kandahar in the House of the People of Parliament, and became a leading advocate of women's rights. She was the only one of the four women elected in 1965 to run for re-election in 1969, but lost her seat.

In 1987 she became President of the Afghan Women's Council.

In May 1990 she was appointed cabinet minister of Education and Training in the government of Mohammad Najibullah. She was one of two women in the cabinet alongside Saleha Farooq Etemadi, and one of the first women in the Afghan government.

Esmati-Wardak died on 22 August 2016, at the age of 85–86.
