= Kalima Amankulova =

Kyrgyz-Soviet politician (1915-?)

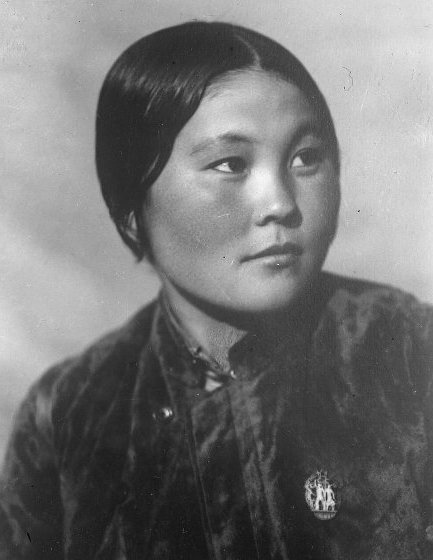

Chairman of the Supreme Soviet of the Kirghiz Soviet Socialist Republic
- In office 1938–1938

Kalima Amankulova (born 1915, date of death unknown) was a Soviet Kyrgyz politician. She was Chairman of the Supreme Soviet of the Kirghiz Soviet Socialist Republic in 1938. Her office as Chairman of the Supreme Soviet nominally made her "Head of the Republic".

== See also ==
- Politics of Kyrgyzstan
