= 1964 Constitution of Afghanistan =

Former monarchy constitution of Afghanistan

Constitution of the Kingdom of Afghanistan
- Created: October 1964

Full text
- Constitution of the Kingdom of Afghanistan at Wikisource

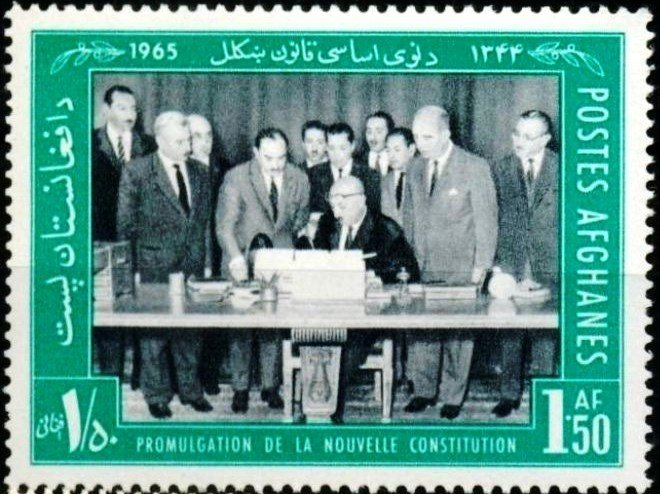
A 1965 Afghan Post postage stamp with a photo of King Mohammad Zahir Shah promulgating the constitution.

The 1964 Constitution of Afghanistan was the supreme law of the Kingdom of Afghanistan from 1964 to 1973. It was annulled following a coup d'état, though parts of the constitution were restored by future governments from 2002 to 2004 and from 2021 to 2022. It was initially drafted by a committee of seven members appointed for the task by the then-king of Afghanistan, Mohammad Zahir Shah.

The committee consisted primarily of figures closely associated with the government. Its members were then-Minister of Justice, Sayyid Shamsuddin Majrooh; Said Qassim Rishtya; Mir Najmuddin Ansari; Mohammad Mossa Shafiq; Abdul Samad Hamed; Hamidullah; and Mir Mohammad Siddiq Farhang.

All except Hamidullah were associated with government ministries, while Hamidullah was a professor at Kabul University.

The primary goals of the Constitution were to prepare the government and the people for gradual democratization and socioeconomic modernization. It also acknowledged freedom of assembly, freedom of association, and freedom of speech. A Loya jirga (grand council of notables) had debated, modified and approved its innovations, which included a bill of rights for all Afghans, explicitly including women. After public review, the constitution was put into effect in October 1964.

Although Afghanistan became a sovereign nation in 1747 under the rule of Ahmad Shah Durrani, the earliest Afghan constitution was written during the reign of Emir Abdur Rahman Khan in the 1890s followed by a 1923 version. The 1964 Constitution transformed Afghanistan into a modern democracy.

== Provisions ==
A new parliament was created, dominated by its lower house (the Wolesi Jirgah), which was to be elected through universal suffrage. It had the power to reject royal appointments to the cabinet and to dismiss it by a vote of no confidence. Laws passed by parliament were to have constitutional precedence over traditional Islamic law (the Sharia). Parliament was to meet regularly, not at royal pleasure as before. It could refuse budget increases, but could not reduce appropriations below the level of the previous year. Its members had control over the organization of parliament and enjoyed legal immunity for what they said in debate. Members had the right to form political parties, but their formation required legislation acceptable to the cabinet and, hence, the king.

Bold as its innovations were compared with the functional autocracy it replaced, the constitution was filled with provisions intended to assure that the royal government would not lose control. A wide constitutional gulf separated the cabinet from the parliament. The cabinet was to exercise the monarch's powers, including the initiation of all government policy and the invocation of emergency decrees. Cooperation between officials and legislators, integral to classical parliamentary systems, was discouraged. Legislators were prohibited from holding ministerial or other executive positions. The cabinet was assured control over the composition of the Meshrano Jirgah, the parliament's upper house.

The constitution also established Afghanistan as a unitary state and administrative subdivisions like provinces, districts, subdistricts, and rural and urban municipalities were under the orders of the central government. Powers were also restricted and local leaders were appointed by the president. The constitution called forelected local councils, however the law responsible for the implementation of said councils wasn't passed.

Judicial restructuring and elective provincial councils were endorsed, but the constitution did not prescribe their structure or working arrangements. The failure to spell out a complete structure for the government lent a provisional character to the constitution. At least seventy articles required parliamentary legislation in order for them to take effect.

The constitution's democratic features were especially provisional. Ample authority was retained for the executive branch to slow, halt or reverse legislation. Nor was caution only displayed toward would-be overweening legislators. The most notorious provision in the constitution was its prohibition of official or political activity by any member of the royal family other than the monarch. The implications of this clause would soon haunt the constitutionalists. No means was provided for an increasingly restless Muhammad Daud, a cousin of the King and former Prime Minister of Afghanistan from 1953 to 1963, to return to power without nullifying the constitution.

== Impact and evaluation ==
Shortly after its enactment, the vulnerability of the constitution to political realities became dramatically clear. The adversarial relationship it created between the cabinet and the parliament brought about tragedy and a serious loss of political momentum. In October 1965, following the election of the new legislature, an impasse over its approval of the new cabinet brought about rioting and intervention by the army leading to the death of at least three student demonstrators. The proposed cabinet was withdrawn, following which a reshuffled one under the leadership of Mohammad Hashim Maiwandwal, a senior diplomat, was approved with little opposition. Officials and legislators were faced with running the new system with hopes considerably dampened.

The liberal or constitutional experiment, which lasted for the next eight years, has been generally seen as a political failure. The cabinet and legislature were constantly deadlocked, unable to enact laws vital to the constitution or seriously weakening it through long delays. Legislators proved to be effective critics of the bureaucracy, which responded by holding back legislation to avoid scrutiny or lengthy disputes.

There was a wide social and cultural gap between the legislators and senior ministry officials. Few of the former had had the exposure to the modern education and foreign experience enjoyed by senior ministry officials. More than 90 percent of the Wolesi Jirgah members represented rural constituencies. Legislators had the right to lobby ministers and senior bureaucrats directly. Doing so was more rewarding than dealing with middle rank provincial officials who had less authority and information. The constitution discouraged executive-legislative cooperation on policy, but it did not prevent the give and take of patronage.

== 2021 Taliban usage ==
After the 2021 Taliban takeover of Afghanistan, the new authorities declared the restoration of parts of the 1964 constitution that are "not in conflict with Islamic Sharia (law)" to govern the country in the interim. However, this decision was overturned by Supreme Leader Hibatullah Akhundzada; it was announced to the public in August 2022 that he had earlier made the decision not to use the 1964 constitution on the basis that it is incompatible with Sharia.
