= 1969 Afghan parliamentary election =

- August 29–September 11, 1969

All 216 seats in the House of the People

Parliamentary elections were held in Afghanistan between August 29 and September 11, 1969. They were the second elections after the introduction of the 1964 constitution, with 2,030 candidates standing for the 216 seats of the House of the People and for one-third of the House of Elders. The single-member plurality electoral system was used.

== Results ==
Many conservative local landowners who had shunned the previous elections in 1965 and 1967 campaigned for office and won seats. Since political parties were not legalized in time for the elections, most of the candidates were men of local prominence, chosen for their personal prestige rather than their political views.

Whilst four PDPA members had been elected in the 1965 election, in 1969 only 2 were elected; Babrak Karmal in Kabul, and Hafizullah Amin in Paghman. The Parcham faction of the PDPA, favoured by Karmal, was particularly disappointed with the result, being supportive of gradual moves towards socialism. In the face of the results Parcham resumed their alliance with "progressive" elements in the Afghan ruling elite. Amin had been the only member of the Khalq faction elected to parliament, and his election increased his standing within the group, which opposed the kind of broad collaboration advocated by Parcham.

Islamic revolutionary groups only began formally organizing after the election, and had no representation in the parliament. The parliament did, however, contain an Islamic conservative bloc.

Other than the dominance of conservative landowners and businessmen, the election also saw the parliament become more ethnically representative, with a far greater number of non-Pashtuns being elected. The election also saw a decline of liberal voices, with most urban liberals losing their seats, and all female delegates losing their seats. Other than Karmal and Amin, there were few leftists in the new parliament, with Mohammad Hashim Maiwandwal, the former Prime Minister and a vocal democratic-socialist, losing his seat as a result of government interference.

The Kabul Times reported that turnout was 60% of registered, though with only 16.6% of the country as registered voters.; Nur Ahmad Etemadi became the new Prime Minister.

== Aftermath ==
Whilst somewhat more reflective of Afghanistan as a whole, the new parliament was plagued by lethargy and deadlock, with only 1 minor bill being passed in the 1969/1970 session. Amid growing polarisation in politics, the King came under increasing criticism (although he maintained his personal popularity) over his political decisions, such as not putting forward his own Prime Ministerial candidate, and from withholding consent from legislation such as the political parties bill.

Some critics focused not on the King, but other members of the royal family, particularly General Sardar Shah Wali Khan, the Kings cousin; son-in-law; and a prominent military figure. Wali was particularly hated by Afghan leftists for having ordered Afghan troops to fire on demonstrations in October 1965. Other major issues involved the government's poor response to the 1972 famine, which had left up to 100,000 Afghans dead. Simultaneously, there was increasing public dissent over the lack of stable governance, with Afghanistan having had 5 Prime Ministers since 1963.

Amid this atmosphere of instability and dissent Mohammed Daoud Khan launched the 1973 coup d'état, ending the Afghan monarchy.
