= House of Elders (Afghanistan) =

Upper house of the former legislature of Afghanistan

House of Elders مشرانو جرگه

Type
- Type: Upper house of the National Assembly

History
- Founded: 1931
- Disbanded: 15 August 2021

Structure
- Seats: 102
- Authority: advisory and limited veto power; no law-making power

Elections
- Voting system: One-third (34) elected by district councils; One-third (34) by provincial councils; One third (34) nominated by the president

Meeting place
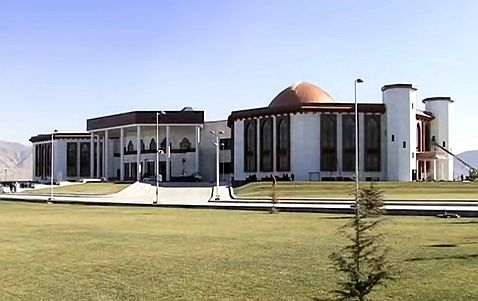
- Kabul

Website
- mj.parliament.af (dead) (15 August 2021 archive)

The House of Elders or Mesherano Jirga (Pashto: د افغانستان مشرانو جرګه), was the upper house of the bicameral National Assembly of Afghanistan, alongside the lower House of the People (Wolesi Jirga). It was effectively dissolved when the Taliban seized power on 15 August 2021. The Taliban did not include the House of Elders and several other agencies of the former government in its first national budget in May 2022. Government spokesman Innamullah Samangani said that due to the financial crisis, only active agencies were included in the budget, and the excluded ones had been dissolved, but noted they could be brought back "if needed."

The House of Elders primarily had an advisory role rather than a maker of law. However, it did have some veto power.

The House of Elders had 102 members. One-third (34) were elected by district councils (one per province) for three-year terms, one-third (34) by provincial councils (one per province) for four-year terms, and one-third (34) were nominated by the president for five-year terms. However, elections for the district councils were not held in the 2005 parliamentary elections. As such, each provincial council also selected one of its elected members to temporarily hold seats in the house until district council elections were held. Half of the presidential nominees had to be women, two representatives from the disabled and impaired and two from the Kuchis.

== Speakers ==
Speakers of the Mesherano Jirga since establishment in 1931

Name	Entered office	Left office	Notes
Mirza Abdul Latif Khan	1931	1933	
Mohammed Ata Khan	1934	1936	
Mir Ata Mohammad Khan	1937	1939	
Mir Ata Mohammad Khan	1940	1942	
Mir Ata Mohammad Khan	1943	1945	
Fazi Ahmad Khan Mojadadi	1946	1948	
Fazi Ahmad Khan Mojadadi	1949	1951	
Fazi Ahmad Khan Mojadadi	1952	1954	
Fazi Ahmad Khan Mojadadi	1955	1957	
Hafiz Abdul Ghafar	1958	1960	
Abdul Hadi Dawi	1961	1964	
Abdul Hadi Dawi	1965	1968	
Abdul Hadi Dawi	1969	1972	
Dissolved	1973	1988	
Mahmood Habibi	31 May 1988	1992	
Not functioning	1992	2005	
Sibghatullah Mojaddedi	December 2005	29 January 2011	
Fazel Hadi Muslimyar	29 January 2011	15 August 2021	

== Reserved seats for women ==
Having been absent from the decision-making process for centuries, Afghan women for the first time entered the political arena in 2001, after the overthrow of Taliban. With the introduction of reserved seats provision in the 2002 Emergency Loya Jirga, when ten percent of 1600 seats were reserved for women, the ground was laid for participation of Afghan women in parliament.

The new 2004 constitution secured reserved seats for women and minorities in both houses of parliament. In the 2005 parliamentarian elections, Afghan women won 89 seats. According to the Inter-Parliamentary Union, in 2009 they held 67 seats (27.7%) in the House of the People and 22 (21.6%) in the House of Elders. This representation was above the worldwide average of 18.5% and above the average of the United States at 16.8% for the House and 15.4% for the Senate.

== See also ==
- National Assembly of Afghanistan
- House of the People (Afghanistan)
- Politics of Afghanistan
- List of legislatures by country
