= Women in the Soviet–Afghan War =

Women in the Soviet–Afghan War were active in a variety of roles.

== Women in the military ==
=== In the Armed Forces of the Democratic Republic of Afghanistan ===
The war years saw a number of firsts for women in the Afghan military. In 1983, Khatool Mohammadzai became the first woman from the country to be trained as a paratrooper. However, she was denied combat positions, so she served as an instructor training soldiers for paratroop and commando roles during the war. In 1989, Latifa Nabizada and her sister Laliuma became the first two women pilots to join the Afghan military school in the Afghan Air Force, becoming finally admitted after having been denied admission several times on "medical grounds."

According to British academic Anthony Hyman, "the PDPA regime made much of its recruitment of Afghan women in the towns to form women's militias and special defence forces. It claimed to be training many thousands of women in weapons skills, especially in the capital. Women featured regularly in Afghan TV propaganda films about how the people were rallying around the government. Female militia units, though, were seen only in formal parades, and never in combat."

A number of women were also involved in the Defense of the Revolution irregular paramilitary and popular militia units created by the Communist government of Afghanistan following the 1978 Saur Revolution, armed by the government and employed to guard sensitive infrastructure and maintain public order. However, almost all mention of the NODR disappeared following the Soviet invasion of Afghanistan in December 1979, possibly as the Soviets considered a loosely accountable body of irregular armed groups to be undesirable during their occupation.

=== In the Afghan mujahideen ===
Bibi Ayesha, a female warlord in the Nahrin District who fought against the Soviet invasion achieved a degree of notability.

=== Soviet military ===
At least 20,000 women were enlisted as support staff by the Soviet military during the War, working in roles such as field nurses, administrators, and military prosecutors. At least 56 Soviet women were killed during the War; however, the true number of female casualties is unknown as the Soviet Union did not officially count them. In 2006, the Russian government passed a law declaring civilians who worked in Afghanistan not entitled to war benefits.

According to the General Staff of the Armed Forces of the Russian Federation, "there were no Afghan bordellos available to Soviet soldiers, so sexual tension was high and centered around the few available Soviet women. The Soviet World War II tradition of the 'field wife' was revived in Afghanistan. Soviet women working in the headquarters, communications sites, hospitals, PXs, and support areas were avidly courted by Soviet officers."

== War crimes and violence against women ==
Despite nominal Soviet efforts to advance women's rights during the War, women still faced intense levels of discrimination and violence, including murder of civilians and rape from Soviet troops, and the end of the war and subsequent collapse of the Democratic Republic of Afghanistan led to an intense backlash against women's rights. According to Aisha Ahmad of the University of Cambridge:

Under Communist occupation, wartime rape gained popularity as a military strategy to repress insurgency... It is perhaps due to the great importance of traditional family honor codes in Afghanistan that wartime rape became a prevalent military strategy during the Soviet-Afghan War, employed to intimidate and terrorize enemy factions. Rape and torture were used specifically against those villages that were suspected to have supported the resistance, and soldiers were reported to have raped women in front of their male relatives. Afghan women, while not active combatants against the Soviets, were also the direct targets of "deliberate and arbitrary killings," persecution, terror tactics, and deprivation, as well as sexual abuse, forced marriage, and prostitution by pro-Soviet militia.

== Civilians ==
=== Women's legal rights ===
According to Amnesty International: "the 20th Century had seen relatively steady progression for women's rights in Afghanistan... But during coups and Soviet occupation in the 1970s, through civil conflict between Mujahideen groups and government forces in the '80s and '90s, and then under Taliban rule, women in Afghanistan had their rights increasingly rolled back."

During the war, the Soviet-backed government made a number of attempts to modernise the situation of women's rights in Afghanistan, including granting equal employment rights and mandating education for girls. By 1988, women made up 40 percent of the doctors and 60 percent of the teachers at Kabul University; 440,000 female students were enrolled in different educational institutions and 80,000 more in literacy programs. According to Arline Lederman, "The Soviet invasion of Afghanistan, devastating though it was, brought further positive evolution to the public Afghan woman. Veils in urban areas were almost completely gone, jobs for women were mostly open, and equality for women was frequently presumed and certainly stated." According to Kenneth Katzman of the Congressional Research Service, during the Soviet occupation of Afghanistan, "there were few, if any, official limitations on women's rights, although areas outside Soviet/Afghan government control saw substantial adherence to Islamic customs."

British historian Mark Urban has written that the 1979 Herat uprising, one of the major outbreaks of unrest leading up to the Soviet intervention, was largely sparked by the communist government's literacy campaign aimed at women. According to Urban, "the months leading up to the first anniversary of the April Revolution were marked by the launch of a major literacy campaign. The aim was to teach a million people to read and write in the first year of the campaign. Illiteracy was a particular problem among women, in fact almost none could read. This constituted a major social disadvantage for Afghan women, but attempts to teach them to read provoked enormous hostility from conservatives."

=== Women in government ===
Anahita Ratebzad served as Deputy Chair of the Revolutionary Council between 1980 and 1985. According to British academic Anthony Hyman, "since Dr. Ratebzad's fall from grace, no women emerged in any way comparable in energy or prestige in the PDPA hierarchy. A considerable number of Afghan women did, however, hold posts at middle levels of responsibility. After a gap, two women were appointed to head minor ministries in May 1990, Masuma Esmati-Wardak for Education and Training, and Saleha Farooq Etemadi for Social Security."

=== Women's organisations ===
The Afghan Women's Council (AWC) was an organization under the Democratic Republic of Afghanistan (1978–87) and the Republic of Afghanistan (between 1987 and 1992), providing social services to women in Afghanistan, fighting against illiteracy, and offering vocational training. Many feared the sacrificing of the AWC in the national reconciliation talks which started in 1987.

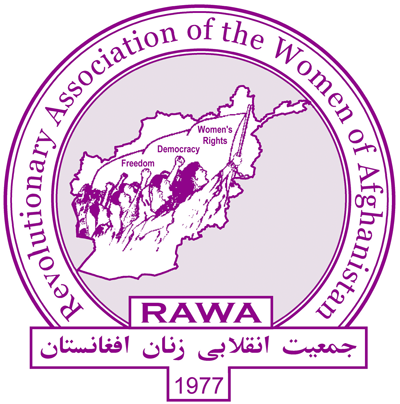
Logo of the Revolutionary Association of the Women of Afghanistan

The Soviet invasion was not met with support from all women's rights groups. Timothy Nunan of Oxford University has argued that "Soviet and Afghan feminists tried – and largely failed – to communicate with one another at a moment when it appeared possible to create a secular socialist modernity in Afghanistan." The Revolutionary Association of the Women of Afghanistan was founded in 1977 by Meena Keshwar Kamal, an Afghan student activist, and began a campaign against Soviet forces and the Soviet-supported government of Afghanistan after the invasion. Kamal was assassinated in Quetta, Pakistan, in 1987, possibly by the Afghan Intelligence Service KHAD or on the orders of fundamentalist Mujahideen leader Gulbuddin Hekmatyar.

=== Refugees ===
Women refugees often faced significant issues with discrimination, especially as some refugee camps were de facto controlled by fundamentalist Mujahideen. According to Faridullah Bezhan of Monash University, several refugee camps "served as laboratories for Islamic fundamentalists, allowing them to control and segregate women, a practice that they implemented in full when they took over the country in the early 1990s" and that Western aid for refugees tended to emphasise the geopolitics of bringing down the Soviet-backed government, leading to widespread cooperation with fundamentalist Mujahideen. According to Sima Samar, a doctor and refugee during the War who later served as Minister of Women's Affairs of Afghanistan from 2001 to 2003: "For female refugees the living conditions were particularly dire. There was little to no access to basic necessities such as washrooms, medical clinics, and education. The aid that was being distributed was both male and war dominated." According to British academic Anthony Hyman, "education for girls languished in Pakistan, as in rural areas of Afghanistan, where conservative mullahs' influence grew enormously in the 1980s."

== Women of other nationalities ==
Joanne Herring, an American socialite and diplomat who had a long association and political relations with the President of Pakistan Zia-ul-Haq during the 1980s, was a leading figure in creating United States support for the Mujahideen during the War.

In 1988, British journalist Christina Lamb was awarded Young Journalist of the Year for her coverage of the Soviet occupation of Afghanistan.

== Post-war ==
Following the collapse of the Democratic Republic of Afghanistan and the creation of the Islamic State of Afghanistan led by the mujahideen group Jamiat-e-Islami in 1992, most women who had held high level positions in the DRA bureaucracy were fired. Compulsory veiling was also introduced. According to Saba Gul Khattak of the Sustainable Development Policy Institute, "although progress on women's rights in Afghanistan was undeniably slow, it was reversed when the US-backed mujahideen took over in April 1992. This government had no national policy on women's rights — indeed, it was itself hardly a viable government, as infighting among different factions led to a complete breakdown of order."

== In popular media ==
Jeffrey W. Jones of the University of North Carolina at Greensboro has argued that "the representation of women in Zinky Boys: Soviet Voices from the Afghanistan War by Svetlana Alexievich reflects a changing discourse in Soviet society on the war in Afghanistan that helped pave the way for the collapse of the USSR."

== See also ==
- Women in the Soviet Union
- Women in Afghanistan
- Women in the Russian and Soviet military
- Democratic Republic of Afghanistan
