= Women in war =

Involvement of women during periods of war

Throughout history, women have assumed diverse roles during periods of war, contributing to war efforts in various capacities.

Women served as warriors in many ancient armies. Some ancient civilizations like the Scythians, Sarmatians and many others had female regiments which inspired the creation of the story of the Amazons in Ancient Greece.

During World War I and World War II, the primary role of women shifted towards employment in munitions factories, agriculture and food rationing, and other areas to fill the gaps left by men who had been drafted into the military. One of the most notable changes during World War II was the inclusion of many of women in regular military units. In several countries, including the Soviet Union, Nazi Germany, and the United Kingdom in the European Theater, as well as China and Imperial Japan in the Pacific Theater, women served in combat roles, such as anti-aircraft warfare, guerrilla warfare, and direct engagement in frontline battles. Additionally, women were also active in underground and resistance movements.

After 1945, the roles available to women in major armies were significantly reduced. However, beginning in the 1970s, women gradually assumed increasing roles in the military of major nations, eventually including combat positions such as pilots by 2005 in the United States. These new combat roles sparked controversy, with debates centered around differences in physical capabilities between the sexes, and issues related to gender identity for both women and men. A number of studies indicate that some objections may be unfounded, as female units perform similarly to male units.

== History ==
- History of women in the military
- Uprisings led by women
- Women in warfare and the military in the ancient era
- Women in warfare and the military in the medieval era
  - Women in the Crusades
  - Roles of women, children, and class
- Women in warfare and the military in the early modern era
- Women in warfare and the military (1750–1799)
  - Women in the American Revolution
  - Women in the French Revolution
  - Women in the Haitian Revolution
- Women in warfare and the military in the 19th century
  - List of female American Civil War soldiers
- Women in warfare and the military (1900–1939)
- Women in warfare and the military (1900–1945)
- Women in warfare and the military (1945–1999)

== World War I ==
- Women's roles in the World Wars
- Women in the World War I
- Home front during World War I
- Australian women during World War I
- Belgium in World War I
- British home front during the First World War
- Canadian women during the World Wars
- History of Germany during World War I
- Women in the Russian Revolution
- United States home front during World War I

== Interwar period ==
- Women in the Spanish Civil War

== World War II ==
- Women's roles in the World Wars
  - Code Girls
  - Home front during World War II
  - Housewives' demonstrations – Women protest poverty and rationing in WW2 France
  - United States home front during World War II
    - Canadian women during the World Wars
  - Soviet women in World War II
  - Sexual violence during the Holocaust

== Cold War ==
- Women in the North Korean Revolution
- Women in the Cuban Revolution
- Women in the Algerian War
- Women in the Vietnam War
- Role of women in the Nicaraguan Revolution
- Women in the Soviet–Afghan War
- Women in the Iran–Iraq War

== 21st century conflicts ==
- Women in the war in Donbas (2014–2022)
- Women in the Russian invasion of Ukraine
- Women in the Gaza war

== Contemporary ==
- Conscription and sexism
- Women in the military by country
- Women in the military in the Americas
- Women in the military in Europe
- Women in warfare and the military (2000–present)
- Women in combat
- Women in the military

== See also ==
- Gender in security studies
- International Conference of Women Workers to Promote Permanent Peace
  - List of wartime cross-dressers
- Timeline of women in warfare in the United States from 1900 to 1949
  - Timeline of women in war in the United States, Pre-1945
- Timeline of women in warfare in the United States from 1950 to 1999
- Timeline of women in warfare and the military in the United States, 2000–2010
- Timeline of women in warfare and the military in the United States from 2011–present
- Wartime cross-dressing
- Women at the Hague
- Women in the decolonisation of Africa
- Women Strike for Peace
- Women's International League for Peace and Freedom
