= Safia Firozi =

Female Afghan Air Force pilot

- صفیه فیروزی
- Born: Kabul, Afghanistan
- Known for: Second Afghan Air Force female fixed-wing pilot
- Spouse: Mohammad Jawad Najafi
- Children: 1 daughter (Narges)

Safia Firozi (Pashto: صفیه فیروزی) is an Afghan pilot. She is the second female pilot in the Afghan Army.
In August 2021 she was said to have been killed by the Taliban, but the news and images were fake.
She wants to continue her career as a pilot.
