= Mohammad Dawran =

Former Commander of the Afghan Air Force

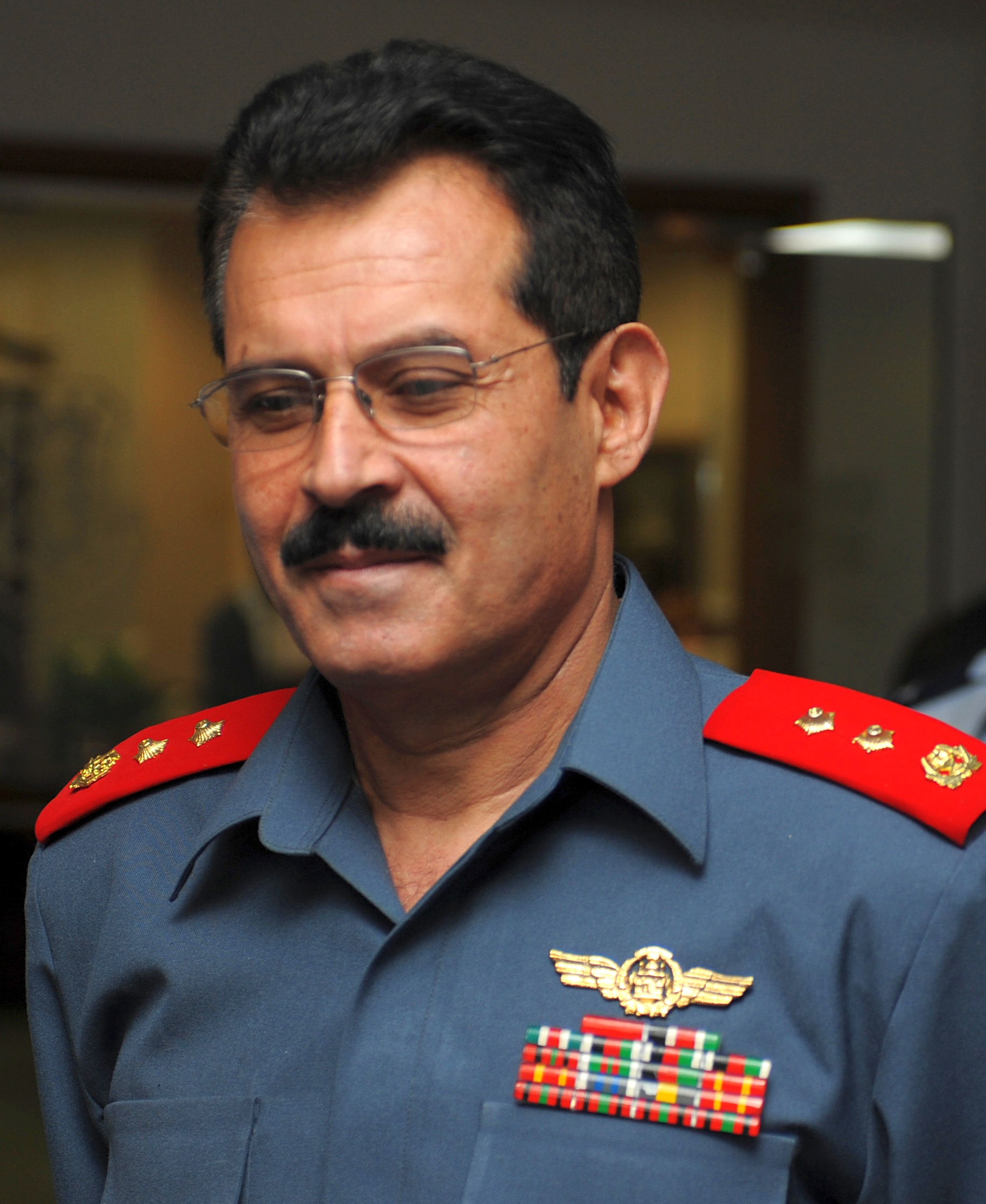
- Mohammad Dawran in 2009
- Born: January 20, 1954 (age 72); Nijrab District, Kapisa Province, Kingdom of Afghanistan
- Military career
- Branch: Afghan Air Force
- Service years: 1973–1990 (DRAAF) 2005–2021 (Afghan Air Force)
- Rank: Major General
- Unit: 322nd Air Regiment (DRAAF)
- Conflicts: Soviet-Afghan War; War in Afghanistan (2001-2021)

Mohammad Dawran (born 20 January 1954) is an Afghan former military officer as well as the former Commander of the Afghan Air Force, enlisting in 1973. He was promoted to the post in 2005 by Defense Minister Abdul Rahim Wardak and the Commander-in-Chief Bismillah Khan Mohammadi. His permanent post was in Bagram Air Base, the largest air base in Afghanistan and one of the largest air bases in the region. The new commander of the Afghan Air Force, Amanuddin Mansoor, was appointed in December 2021.

== Personal life ==
He was born in the Nijrab District of Kapisa Province of Afghanistan to a father who was a village school teacher, spending most of his childhood in Takhar and Kapisa. He is an ethnic Tajik. Dawran became an air force pilot in 1976 and was one of two people selected for the 1988 Soyuz TM-6, the sixth crewed spacecraft to visit the Soviet Space Station Mir. Instead of Dawran, Abdul Ahad Momand was chosen, which became his second space journey, as Dawran had appendicitis. Dawran is married and has six children.

== Career ==
At the age of 12, Dawran and his family moved to the capital of Afghanistan, Kabul, in order to attend the Kabul Military Academy, under the reign of Mohammad Zahir Shah. At the age of 18, Dawran decided he wanted to pursue military aviation, therefore he entered the Afghan Air Force’s flight school shortly after his graduation, which was officially known as the Royal Afghan Air Force in this period. A year later, he was sent to the Frunze Flight School (now Bishkek) in the Kirghiz Soviet Socialist Republic, where he began practicing his flight skills with Yakovlev Yak-18 and Aero L-29 Delfín aircraft.

Details about his service in the Afghan Air Force under the Republic of Afghanistan are unknown, but in 1976, Mohammed Dawran became a MiG-21 pilot in an elite unit of the 322nd Air Regiment (IAP) at Bagram Airfield, due to his exceptional piloting skills and the ability to command others. He was a flight commander, later becoming a squadron commander.

Under the Democratic Republic of Afghanistan, where the Afghan Air Force was at its strongest, he took courses for senior commanders at the Kiev Branch of the Air Force Academy, which was named after Soviet cosmonaut Yuri Gargarin, in 1984. In November 1987, Dawran was chosen as a candidate for the Soyuz TM-6 space mission, alongside other candidates such as Sher Zamin, the first Hero of the Democratic Republic of Afghanistan. Since February 1988, he underwent space flight training at a training centre yet again named after Yuri Gargarin, but despite Dawran’s training, his connections in the People's Democratic Party of Afghanistan and his past excellence during his service in the air force, he would be transferred to a backup position and Abdul Ahad Momand would be selected for the space mission, as Dawran had appendicitis. Dawran continued to serve in the 322nd Air Regiment, although he was arrested on suspicion of participating in the 1990 Afghan coup attempt against President Najibullah, along with Abdul Wahab Wardak, who was his closest friend. Wahab was later released and joined Junbish-e-Mili, whereas Dawran joined Jamiat-e Islami. In 1994, both Dawran and Wahab fought each other.
