= Niloofar Rahmani =

First female Afghan Air Force pilot

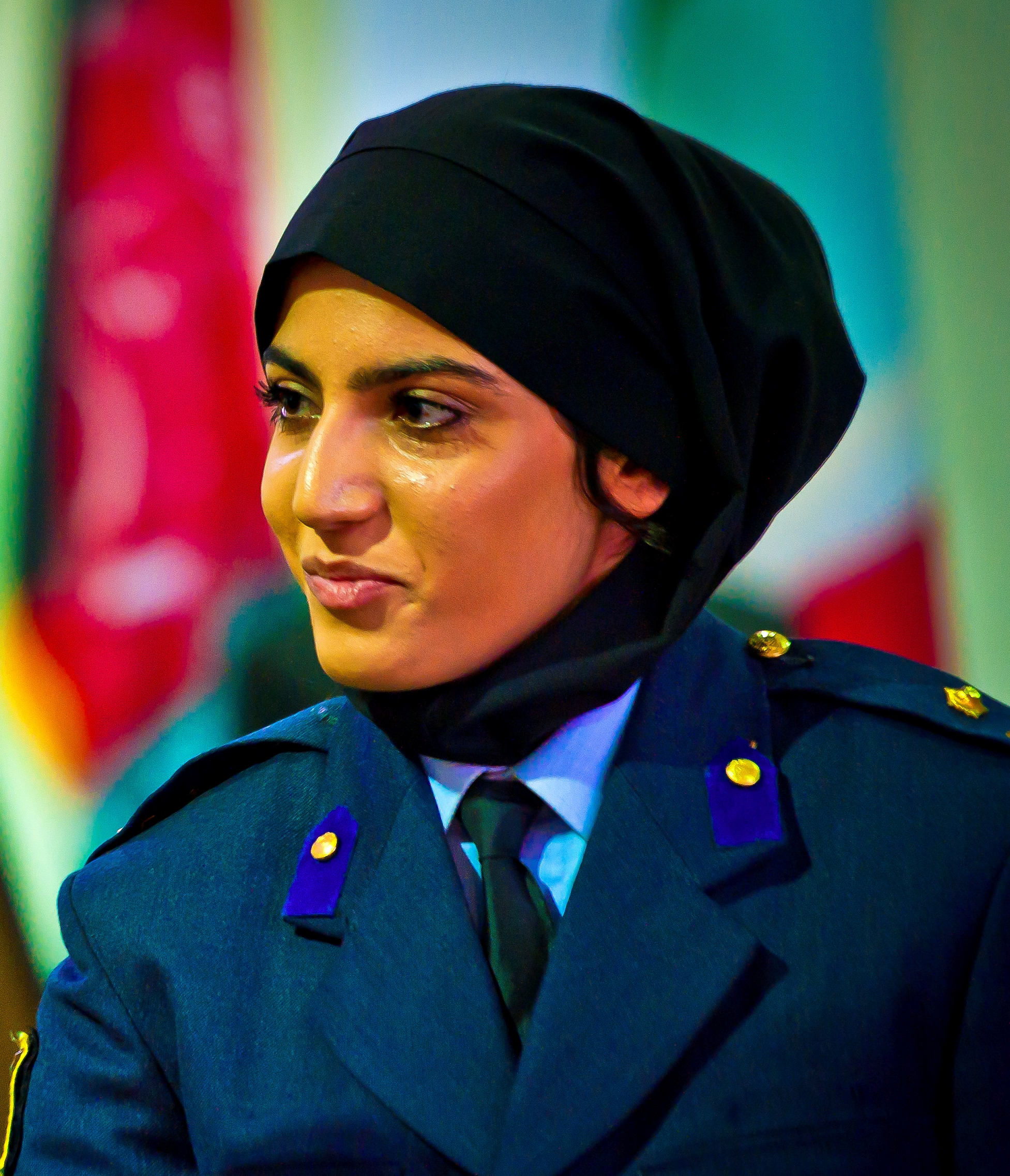
- Rahmani in 2013
- Born: 1992 (age 33–34); Kabul, Afghanistan
- Military career
- Allegiance: Afghanistan
- Branch: Afghan Air Force
- Service years: 2012–2018

Niloofar Rahmani (Dari: نیلوفر رحمانی, born early 1990s) is the first female fixed-wing Air Force aviator in Afghanistan's history and the first female pilot in the Afghan Air Force since the fall of the Taliban in 2001. Though her family received death threats, she persevered to complete her training and won the U.S. State Department's International Women of Courage Award in 2015.

== Early life ==
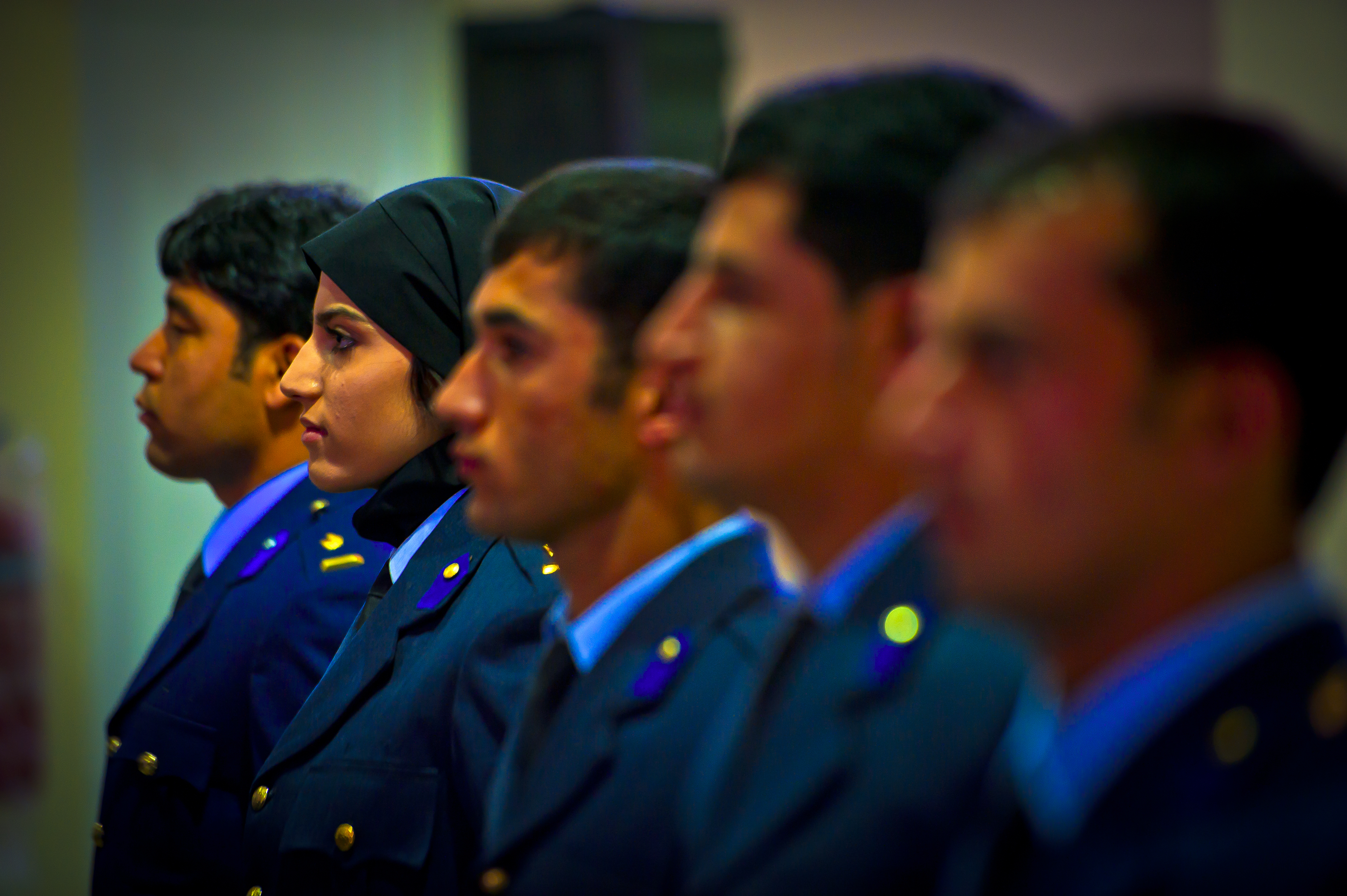
2nd Lt. Niloofar Rahmani stands alongside the other four graduates of undergraduate pilot training just prior to receiving their pilot wings at a ceremony on 14 May 2013 at Shindand Air Base, Afghanistan.

Rahmani was born in Afghanistan in 1992 in a Persian-speaking family. She lived with her family in Pakistan before returning to Kabul in 2001. Since she was a child, she had a dream of becoming a pilot and spent nearly a year studying English to be able to attend flight school. She is of Tajik descent.

== Flight career ==
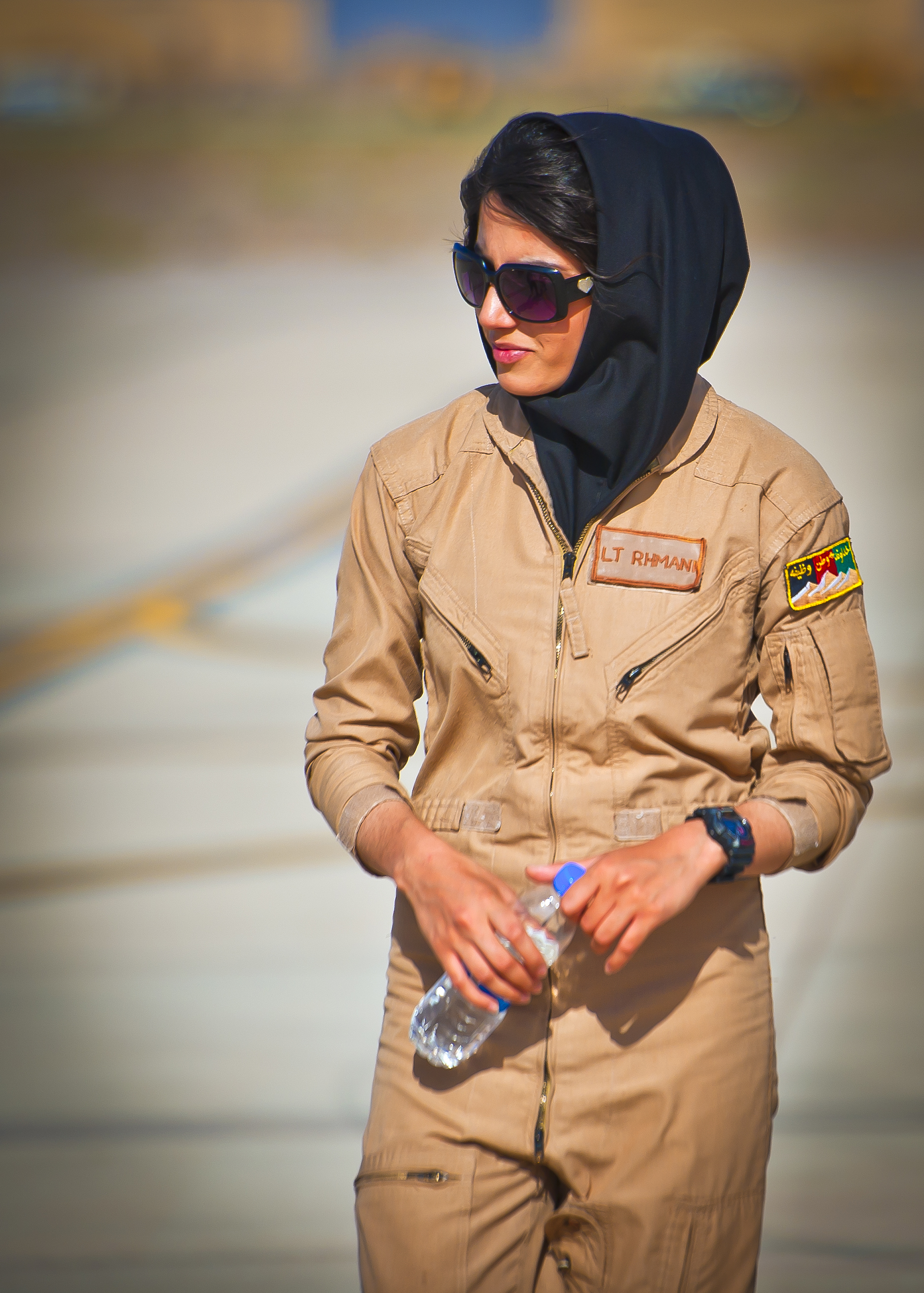
2nd Lt. Niloofar Rahmani in 2013

She enlisted in the Afghan Air Force Officer Training Program in 2010 and in July 2012 graduated as a Second Lieutenant. Throughout the program, Afghan air force doctors attempted to deem her physically unfit to fly; she was the only female candidate in the program. Two female helicopter pilots during the Soviet era, the Nabizada sisters, along with her father, served as inspiration for Rahmani's achievement.

Her first solo flight was in a Cessna 182. Wanting to fly larger aircraft, she went to advanced flight school and was soon flying the C-208 military cargo aircraft. Women are traditionally banned from transporting dead or wounded soldiers; however, Rahmani defied orders when she discovered injured soldiers upon landing in one mission. Flying them to a hospital, she reported her actions to her superiors, who imposed no sanctions.

When her achievements were publicized, Captain Rahmani's family received threats from both family members and the Taliban, which disapproved of her ambition and career choices. The family has had to move several times but Rahmani was resolute and aimed to fly a larger C-130 plane and become a flight instructor to inspire other women. She began training on C-130s with the US Air Force in 2015 and completed the program in December 2016, following which she applied for asylum in the United States. Rahmani hoped to eventually become a military pilot for the United States Air Force.

== Asylum ==
Rahmani, who was represented by International Attorney Kimberley Motley, was granted asylum in the United States in April 2018. She lives in Florida with a sister, who is attempting to gain asylum as well. She works as a translator in Persian, Dari and English languages.

In 2021 she published with Open Skies: My Life as Afghanistan's First Female Pilot her autobiography.

== See also ==
- Afghan Air Force
- Bibi Ayesha
- Latifa Nabizada
- Khatool Mohammadzai
- Women's rights in Afghanistan
