= Khatool Mohammadzai =

Afghan brigadier general (born 1966)

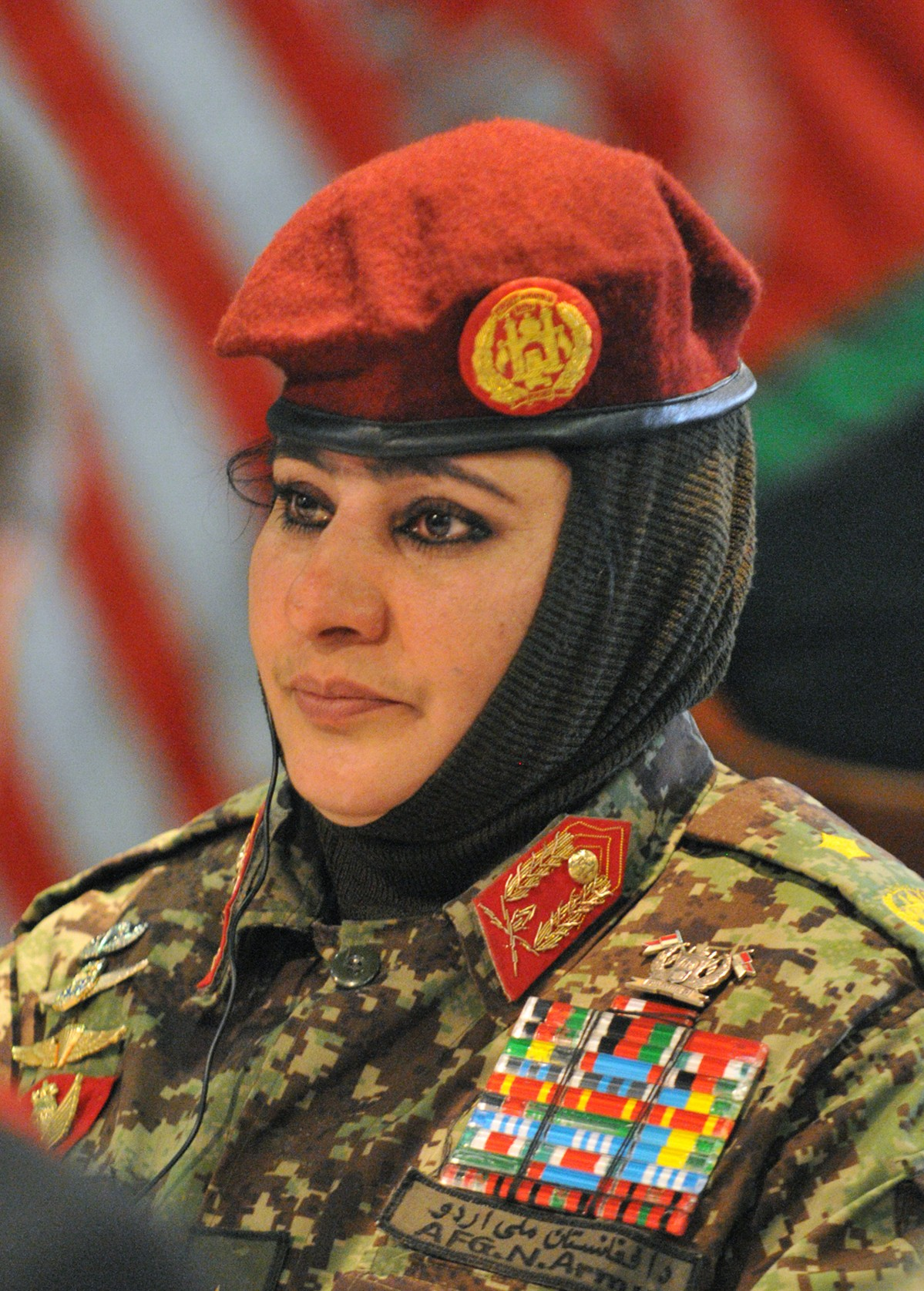
- Khatool Mohammadzai in 2012
- Born: ca. 1966; Kabul, Afghanistan
- Military career
- Allegiance: Afghanistan
- Branch: Afghan Army; Afghan National Army
- Service years: 1983–1996; 2001–2020
- Rank: Colonel General
- Conflicts: Soviet-Afghan War; Afghan Civil War (1989-1992); Afghan Civil War (1992-1996); War in Afghanistan (2001-2021)

Khatool Mohammadzai (Pashto: خاتول محمدزی; born c. 1966) is an Afghan brigadier general who served in the Afghan National Army. She was first commissioned in the military of the Democratic Republic of Afghanistan during the 1980s, trained as one of the few female paratroopers; she has since logged over 600 jumps in her career. She continued to serve in the Afghan military as an instructor until the Taliban took power in 1996. Reinstated to the military created after the United States invasion in 2001, she became the first woman in Afghan history to reach general officer rank.

== Career ==
Mohammadzai was born in Kabul, Afghanistan around 1966. She joined the Armed Forces of the Democratic Republic of Afghanistan in 1983 after she graduated from secondary school, and volunteered to be a paratrooper. Succeeding at the strenuous training for the Afghan Commando Forces, including completing a 150 kilometres (93 mi) march from Kabul to Jalalabad, across the mountains in two days, she made her first jump in 1984. After earning her wings, she studied at the Kabul University legal faculty, graduating with a bachelor's degree, so she could be commissioned as an officer. She would later undertake advanced studies at a military academy in the Soviet Union. During the Soviet–Afghan War, she was denied combat positions, so she served as a paratroop instructor training soldiers for paratroop and commando roles.

She married in 1990 and had one son before her husband, a fellow army officer, was killed in combat in 1991. After the collapse of the government in 1992, she served under the Mujahadeen government during the civil war in the early 1990s, and was put in charge of women's training for the army's air defense branch. However, she was barred from parachute jumps and subject to new restrictions such as a requirement to wear an abaya while in public. After the Taliban took control of the country in 1996, she was forced out of the military and as a widow was effectively confined indoors. She survived on odd jobs such as sewing, and ran a secret school for girls.

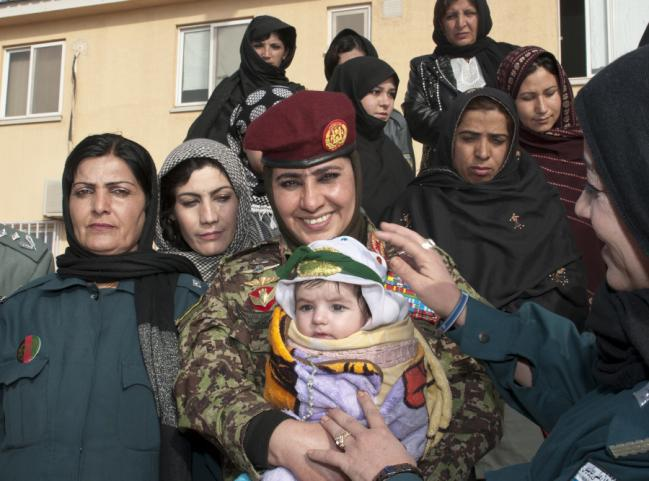
Brig. Gen. Khatool Mohammadzai with female agents of the Afghan National Police

Following the fall of the Taliban in 2001, she joined Afghanistan's newly formed military, and was promoted to the rank of brigadier general by President Hamid Karzai. At first, Mohammadzai got back into physical shape and resumed parachute jumping. She trained with American paratroopers, and worked with NATO officers on starting a new paratroop training program for the ANA. In 2004, she competed against 35 male competitors from Afghanistan and other countries in a parachuting contest, and won.

In addition to serving as a paratrooper, Mohammadzai was made deputy director for women's affairs in the Ministry of Defense. However, as a result of what some observers, such as Amnesty International, say is institutionalized gender discrimination in Afghanistan's leadership, she has not been allowed to jump since 2006, instead serving at Ministry of Defense headquarters, starting in a position not befitting a general officer. By 2012, she had been promoted to director of women's affairs in the National Army, and deputy director of planning and physical training for a planned disaster preparation force, and was the highest ranking female officer in the Afghan military.

== See also ==
- Afghan National Army
- Bibi Ayesha
- Latifa Nabizada
- Niloofar Rahmani
- Women's rights in Afghanistan
