= Latifa Nabizada =

Afghan aviation pioneer

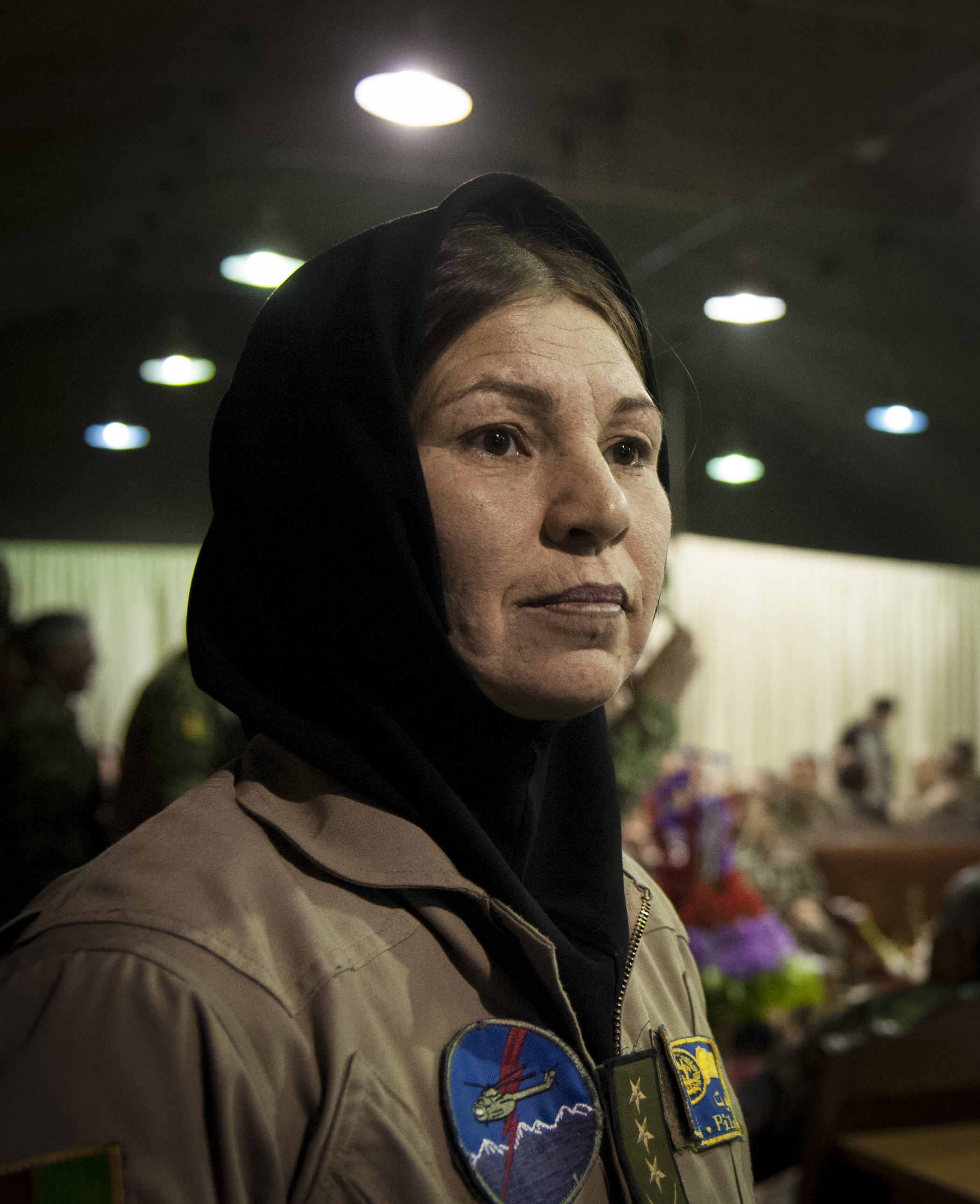
- Colonel Latifa Nabizada in 2013.
- Born: ca. 1969; Kabul, Afghanistan
- Military career
- Allegiance: Afghanistan
- Branch: Afghan Air Force
- Service years: 1989–1996; 2001–2021
- Rank: Colonel
- Conflicts: War in Afghanistan (1978–present)

Latifa Nabizada is an Afghan helicopter pilot in the Afghan Air Force. She is one of the first two women pilots to serve in Afghanistan that were qualified to fly a Mi-17 helicopter. By 2013, she was a colonel in the new Afghan Air Force. Nabizada's own career in the Afghan military has inspired other women to join.

== Biography ==
=== Early life and career ===
Nabizada grew up in a middle-class neighborhood in the 1970s, though her father spent six years in jail after being accused of being a member of the Mujahadeen. She is ethnically Uzbek, and "deeply religious," following Islam. Nabizada and her sister, Laliuma Nabizada both wanted to become pilots after they completed school, joining through the ‘Aviation Enthusiasts Club’ which was affiliated with the Democratic Youth Organisation of Afghanistan, and applied to the Afghan military school in the Afghan Air Force. They were denied several times on "medical grounds," but were finally admitted in 1989 when a civilian doctor certified them. Both sisters had to make their own uniforms, since there were no women's uniforms ready made in the military. In 1991, she and her sister graduated from the helicopter flight school and were part of the 377th Helicopter Regiment of the Afghan Air Force. Both Latifa and her sister began to fly transport missions during the Afghan civil war. During her missions, she and her sister would often fly together, though other missions were solo, in which they had to avoid the Stinger missiles used by the Mujahadeen, the greatest threat at the time to Soviet and Afghan military aircraft. After the fall of the Communist regime in 1992, the new Mujahadeen government kept the Nabizada sisters on its service as pilots.

=== The Taliban era and exile ===
In 1996, when the Taliban seized Kabul, the sisters moved to Mazar-i Sharif in a secure place found by General Abdul Rashid Dostum. Their hiding place in Mazar-i Sharif was betrayed by a former Air Force member who defected to the Taliban and the sisters and their family fled to Pakistan because their lives were threatened. In 1998, during the capture of Mazar-i Sharif, she and her sister stole a helicopter with the intention of fleeing to safe haven to Uzbekistan, but they eventually turned back because of their family who they couldn't leave behind. During this period, the Taliban searched for the sisters, even detaining and torturing her three brothers, who never revealed their location. She and her family finally settled in Pakistan where they lived in the refugee camps around Peshawar until 2000, when they decided to move back to Afghanistan. Following the fall of the Taliban regime in 2001, the Nabizada family returned to Kabul, where the sisters offered their services to the new Afghan Government of Hamid Karzai and were reinstated in the newly created Afghan National Army Air Corps as helicopter pilots.

=== The post-Taliban years ===
In 2004, Latifa was married in an arranged marriage to a doctor's aide, and her sister was also married, but continued to fly after their marriage. In 2006, both sisters became pregnant. They were still flying missions for as long as they were able during their pregnancies. Latifa had no problem giving birth to her daughter, Malalai, but her sister Laliuma died in childbirth. For some time, Nabizada breastfed both her daughter and her sister's daughter, Mariam, but when it became too much to take care of her niece, her grandmother took over the care for Mariam. A few months later, Nabizada went back to work with the military, the first time without her sister. Because her husband worked and there was no childcare or other family to take care of Malalai, Nabizada took her daughter with her to work and on flights in the helicopter. Malalai was only 2 months old when she first flew in the helicopter. She and her daughter had flown over 300 missions together by 2011. Most of her missions with her daughter were humanitarian in nature. Once her daughter was old enough to attend school, she started going. Nabizada has encouraged the military to provide childcare to the women that are starting to join.

In 2013, Nabizada's family faced death threats from the Taliban due to her flying, so she was transferred to a desk job at the Afghan Ministry of Defense in Kabul.

== Published works ==
- ″Greif nach den Sternen, Schwester!″ Mein Kampf gegen die Taliban. With Andrea-Claudia Hoffmann. Munich: Knaur 2014.

== See also ==
- Afghan Air Force
- Bibi Ayesha
- Niloofar Rahmani
- Khatool Mohammadzai
- Women's rights in Afghanistan
