= Women in the Cuban Revolution =

Women in Cuba

Women in the Cuban Revolution were active in a wide variety of roles. Women's participation in the Cuban Revolution was spurred by decades of oppression and limited opportunities. The revolution saw an end to certain forms of restriction and sexism in Cuba. Programs through the Cuban government or the FMC (Federation for Cuban Women) allowed for Cuban women to have a more active role in society. However, patriarchal mindsets such as machismo still persisted in the way women were perceived and treated, and still persists today.

Notable women who participated in the revolution include Vilma Espín, who notably helped to organize the 26th of July movement, and Haydée Santamaría, who participated on the assault on the Moncada barracks.

== Cuban women pre-revolution ==
Pre-revolution, women in Cuba were restricted by traditional patriarchal attitudes. There was a belief that a woman’s role was to remain in the home, caring for house and child. Meanwhile, her husband would be the one to either perform intensive labor on his property or to venture out in search of work. Women’s rights were not prioritized in the pre-revolutionary government, as they were seen as counterproductive to the stability of society. With a shortage of jobs pre-revolution, the men’s need to work was prioritized over the women’s. In any capacity where women did perform labor beyond child-rearing and housework, they were restricted to less labor-intensive work than their peers. For example, when harvesting sugar cane, women were tasked with piling the cane, while men were tasked with cutting the cane.

Women were also exploited by the bustling sex industry in Cuba pre-revolution. The sex industry in 1950s Cuba was primarily based on the provision of sexual services by Black and mixed race women to predominantly white North American men. It drew upon a tradition of exoticizing mixed-race Cuban women which originated in the work of male Cuban writers, artists, and poets. The proliferation of male American tourists in Cuba who expected these exotic experiences with a Cuban woman encouraged the rapid development of this industry. There were no significant safety measures to protect Cuban sex workers; this was an issue that was swiftly addressed by the new Cuban government post-revolution.

Cuban women were often intrigued by the experiences of Americans, especially American women. The freedoms that many American women enjoyed made them both the envy of and inspiration for numerous Cuban women. Many Cuban women understood American women through a filtered lens, hearing of them through the stories American tourists would tell. The idea of being able to enjoy these same freedoms as American women was a major motivator in inspiring Cuban women to support and participate in the revolution.

== Women revolutionaries ==
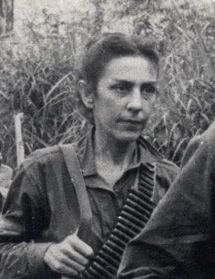
Celia Sánchez in 1958

Women were active in the revolutionary movement in Cuba, composing at least 10-15% of the Rebel Army fighters and taking a number of key leadership positions. In a speech on 1 January 1959, Fidel Castro proclaimed that "when a people has men who fight and women who can fight, that people is invincible."

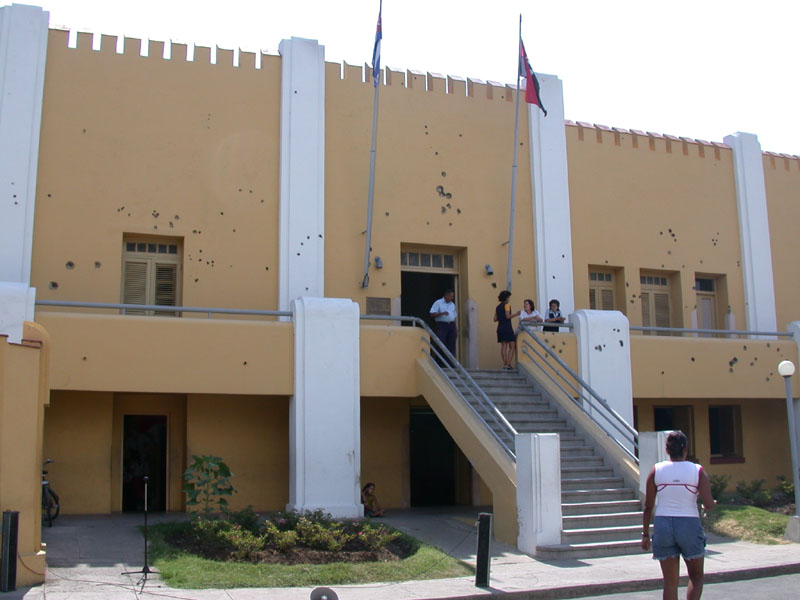
The Moncada Barracks, where the Cuban Revolution officially began. Several prominent women participated in the assault on this location.

Several women were prominently involved in the assault on the Moncada Barracks in July 1953 that began the revolution and sparked the creation of the 26th of July Movement. Haydée Santamaría was one of the few people involved in every phase of the Cuban Revolution from its inception to its fruition. Melba Hernández, after being released from prison for her role in the attack, help lead the publishing and dissemination of Castro's History Will Absolve Me speech and then fought on the Third Eastern Front.

Celia Sánchez, another founder of the 26th of July Movement and who later served in the general staff of the Rebel Army, organized and planned the landing of the Granma in November 1956 and was responsible for organizing reinforcements once the revolutionaries landed. Asela de los Santos helped lead education programs for illiterate rebel soldiers and rural children during her time in the revolutionary army and was later named Minister of Education.

The Mariana Grajales Women's Platoon was founded in September 1958 as Castro's personal bodyguard unit after a group of women led by Isabel Rielo pleaded with him to create a women's unit. Teté Puebla served as second-in-command of the platoon and was named director of the Department for the Care of War Victims after the revolution, later becoming the first women brigadier general in Cuban Revolutionary Armed Forces history.

Women were also active in the urban underground movements in cities, including in organizing protests, distributing clandestine information, smuggling weapons, raids on police stations, and publicizing the torture and arrests of revolutionaries. Natalia Bolivar, who later gained prominence for her work as an anthropologist, was a leading organizer of efforts to secure political asylum for revolutionaries.

However, women still faced discrimination within the ranks of the revolutionary groups and were often confined to more traditional roles, such as cooking food, repairing uniforms, and healing injuries. In one of his diary entries, Che Guevara noted that a female soldier in his group "caused a certain resentment among the men, since Cubans were not accustomed to taking orders from a woman." Women were also generally not widely targeted for recruitment into revolutionary fighting. Linda Reif of City University of New York notes that "excerpts from Radio Rebelde broadcasts, the major revolutionary station, reveal no attempt to mobilize specifically women."

Representation of women’s contributions to the revolution were also carefully calculated and not as in-depth as representations of men’s contributions in post-revolutionary Cuba. Significant women were often discussed in Cuba, but the general contributions of everyday women were rarely mentioned. When they were mentioned, they were often understated or overshadowed by the achievements and contributions of their male counterparts. The Cuban government has only recently begun efforts to recognize the stories of everyday Cuban women who participated in the revolution. At a time when many of them are aging and dying, this means the Cuban government only has a small window of opportunity to discover as many of these women’s stories as they can.

== Vílma Espín ==
Another important woman revolutionary was Vílma Espín. She was born into a wealthy family with a lawyer for a dad. Espín was a very educated woman; she was one of the first ever Latin American women to get a degree in chemical engineering. Her father loved that she was so educated, however, he did not like that she carried socialist ideals; so he decided to send her to America to continue her education at MIT. However, being in America only radicalized her more and her hatred for the U.S. grew. She left America soon after and made her way back to Cuba and she joined the July 26th movement (she also got more involved with the opposition and Fidel Castro). She was so important to the regime, especially because she was bilingual (she spoke English & Spanish), if Vílma Espín wasn't part of the regime, the revolution maybe would've not been as successful.

== Haydée Santamaría ==
Haydée Santamaría was another important woman revolutionary. She was born into a conservative family and she lived a fairly difficult childhood due to poverty. She was only able to attend school until the 6th grade, but because she valued education, she repeated the 6th grade multiple times. She became a teacher to leave her family behind because she was tired of their conservative values. She was able to join her brother, Abel Santamaría and she was soon able to meet his comrades and Fidel Castro. Santamaría participated in the assault on the Moncada Barracks; she was only one of the two women there. In addition to participating in that, she supplied weapons & helped to organize the July 26th Movement. Unfortunately, she got arrested and both her spouse and brother died after the Moncada Barracks assault. Even with their deaths, she kept on going with the regime and she became part of the guerrilla forces that was led by Fidel Castro. After the revolution, she started an institution to educate and work/learn with people who were Latin American dissidents. She was another great woman who helped to lead the revolution to success.

== The Federation of Cuban Women (FMC) ==
The FMC (known as the Federation of Cuban Women), was very influential as an organization, which had members from 80% of the population of girls 14 and up. Created in the 1960s, its president was Vilma Espín Dubois (who was also Raul Castro's wife), with a mission to defend women's rights and to therefore end the discrimination they faced in Cuba. This organization’s proclaimed goals were to gather and inform women about the revolution, as well as make heard women’s interests and goals for the revolution by the leadership of the time. Fidel Castro was a large supporter of this organization, since it would allow them to have a larger role to support the regime economically, politically and socially.

During the Cuban revolution, women were also encouraged by the regime to educate their children to embody the concept of the “new man” which conformed to the ideologies and priorities of the state. State officials and the FMC organization also perpetuated traditional roles that women held by encouraging women to always look put together with motivations such as sponsored beauty contests. The Cuban government also created programs/schools for women to learn things related to their traditional roles in society such as cooking, cleaning and taking care of their children.

Women were also involved in social movements that outright supported the revolution and Fidel Castro. While they were not directly fighting on the front lines, women groups like the Federation of Cuban Women (FMC) actively participated in the revolution by distributing papers, pieces of literature, supporting & starting rallies, and promoting the ideas of revolution. This group also helped to promote healthcare, education & working rights (as well as women's rights). Since this group participated so much in the revolution, they were part of the change (gender norms changed a lot) in Cuba after the revolution. Women were no longer viewed as just caregivers & wives, they were seen as equals by most. In fact, after the revolution, women were able to gain access to good education, adequate healthcare, and the opportunity for jobs; these are things that women used to never have access to in Cuba before the revolution. Since women used to not have such opportunity, women groups and organizations were created to help them navigate through these new lives that they get to live. For example, a group that was created to help women and furthers to improve women's rights in Cuba.

== Opportunities for women after the Revolution ==
While women's rights didn't change immediately and there is still a struggle with women's rights, education and changes in the workforce had the biggest impacts on women. Prior to the revolution, women had very little access to education past primary school (Haydee Santamaría is a good example of this), but after the revolution, the government made it a pivotal point to expand education. Due to this expansion (according to UNESCO) woman literacy rates raised by 36% because of this important change. Another important significant change that the Cuban Revolution fostered was the workforce. Originally, women used to work low level, underpaid, and unskilled jobs but after the revolution, people worked very hard to change this and this allotted for a 26% increase of women working skilled jobs.

Also, the revolution did bring along people who brought about significant changes in the legal/political layout of the country. Many laws that pertain to women started coming out of the Cuban government – The Family Code of 1975 which helped to recognize that women were equal to all her family members and the 1974 Law on Equal Rights & Opportunities which prohibited the discrimination of women in employment and education (in other areas too but those were the two that were most important).

== Women's rights ==
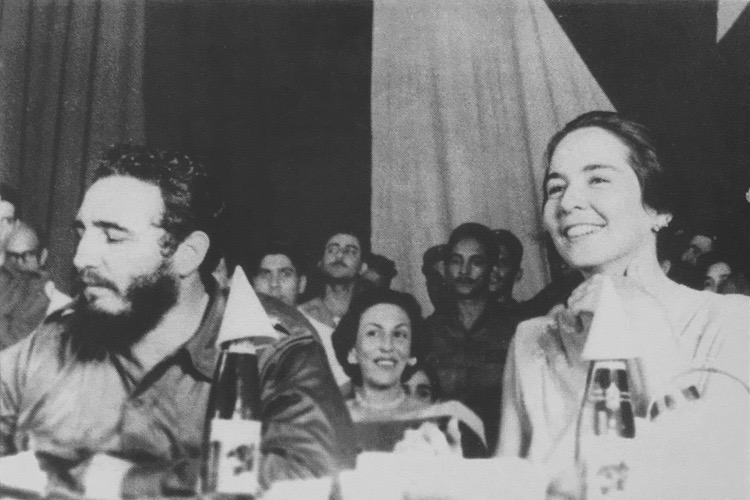
Vilma Espín and Fidel Castro at the founding of the Federation of Cuban Women in 1960

Pre-revolution, the role of women in Cuba fit the patriarchal notions of a post-colonial nation, in which women were meant to remain in the cult of domesticity, rarely allowed outside without an escort, and had very limited access to educational or professional opportunities. It was believed by some Cuban revolutionaries that the sexist roles pressed on to women were a direct result of capitalist influences. They believed that socialism was a woman’s route to equality and freedom; this was embodied in the attitudes that certain revolutionaries, such as Fidel Castro, pushed. Cuban women were encouraged to participate in the revolution so as to bring about not only the freedom of Cuba, but their own freedom. The promises of the revolution stated that the new Cuba would see women as equal to men, instead of requiring them to be subservient to them. With the revolution came a significant increase in women's rights in the country, with Castro noting in a speech that "when our revolution is judged in the years to come, one of the questions that will be asked is how our society and our country resolved the problems of women."

During the revolution itself, the Cuban government worked hard to fight against inequality and injustices women faced in their society. The 1961 literacy campaign for example, allowed for women in all societal classes to benefit from education, with 55% of the 70,000 people who became literate from this campaign being women. The Cuban government also added onto their constitution with sections 41 and 42 which legally promoted equality between men and women.

Post-revolution, the Cuban government took certain measures to attempt to improve the quality of life for women. The new Cuban government made numerous promises to women that their efforts in the revolution would not be in vain; socialism would rescue them from the depths of sexism and would usher in a new era of equal opportunity. While certain aspects of these efforts were successful, women still faced many challenges due to their gender. Labor opportunities became much more widespread for women than before, but the expectation that women would assist in the home remained. Now, women were expected to both work in and out of the home. Expectations for male contributions in the home did not change, meaning that the amount of responsibility on a woman’s shoulders had doubled while her male counterpart’s remained virtually the same. At times, the young women of the household would have to shoulder the responsibility of caring for house and family while their mother worked. This meant that while many new opportunities existed for young women to explore, they were restricted by domestic responsibility in their ability to actually experience them.

The cult of domesticity expanded out into the workforce post-revolution. Part of this was due to the difficulty of encouraging adult Cubans to move beyond traditional notions of gender; many young Cuban women found themselves at odds with their more traditional parents, both during and after the revolution. Nursery programs for young children were a focus of the Cuban government. While efforts to expand this program were successful, they came at a cost for women. Women were seen as much more fitting for nursery care jobs than men, meaning that women often found themselves getting roped into jobs that were centered around their gender rather than their ability or personal experience. Proper training programs for nursery care workers did not come into fruition until several years after the revolution; until this point, the assumption was that a woman was naturally talented enough with childcare to handle working at a nursery without any formal training.

Vilma Espín, who had also fought with the 26th of July Movement, founded the Federation of Cuban Women, serving as leader of the group until her death in 2007.

In 1965, access to abortion in Cuba was expanded, no longer restricted to extreme cases and was to be carried out by public doctors free of charge, rather than by private practitioners.

Cuban women were also greatly affected by the Cuban literacy campaign launched by the government after the revolution. Nicola Murray, writing in Feminist Review, notes that:

55% of the brigadistas (the schoolchildren who went to live with peasant families and taught them to read and write) were girls. For these girls the change was enormous-independent, free of many of the restrictions of their own family life-and this also had some impact on the Cuban public in general, as the campaign was known about and publicized everywhere.

Following the Cuban Revolution in 1959, the new Cuban government saw prostitutes as victims of corrupt and foreign capitalism, and viewed prostitution itself as a "social illness", a product of Cuba's pre-revolutionary capitalist culture, rather than a crime. In 1961, pimping was outlawed. Prostitution itself remained legal, but the government, assisted by the Federation of Cuban Women, attempted to curb it. Medical clinics for health examinations were established, along with rehabilitation programs for pimps and re-education programs for former prostitutes. A census of the sex industry was conducted in 1961, identifying 150,000 prostitutes and 3,000 pimps. Troops raided the red-light districts of Havana, and rounded up hundreds of women, photographed and fingerprinted them, and required them to have physical examinations. Women who wished to leave prostitution were given training courses and offered factory jobs. The result was that, officially, prostitution was eliminated from Cuba, a situation which continued for three decades.

However, despite the improvement in rights brought by the revolution, discrimination against women and Machismo culture remain significant issues in Cuba.

== Women of other nationalities ==
Dickey Chapelle, an American war correspondent photojournalist who first gained prominence for her work during World War II, further gained prominence for her work in the Cuban Revolution, with John Garofolo, author of Dickey Chapelle Under Fire: Photographs by the First American Female War Correspondent Killed in Action stating that "she was the last American journalist Fidel Castro allowed to have [access to the Rebel Army's inner circle] at that point in the revolution."

== See also ==
- Women in Cuba
- Aftermath of the Cuban Revolution
- Prostitution in Cuba
- 26th of July Movement
- History of Cuba
