= Bibi Ayesha =

Afghan warlord

Bibi Ayesha بی‌بی عایشه
- Born: Nahrin District, Baghlan Province, Afghanistan
- Occupation: Former Mujahideen leader

Bibi Ayesha (Dari: بی‌بی عایشه) is a former military leader who was the only known female warlord in Afghanistan. She controlled a force of 500-1000 men in the Nahrin district of Baghlan Province. Also known as Commander Kaftar (Dari: قوماندان کفتر, "The Hyena"), she operated for at least two decades, fighting against Soviet troops and then the Taliban militia as part of Jamiat-e Islami. She continued to operate her militia during the Islamic Republic of Afghanistan.

== Early life ==
She was born in Nahrin district of Baghlan Province to a Tajik family.

She dismissed notions that the roles of women in Afghanistan should exclude military roles, saying "It makes no difference if you are a man or a woman when you have the heart of a fighter." However, she does insist that a mahram male relative, accompany her into battle.

On 18 October 2020, Ayesha came under attack by the Taliban, a day after they claimed that she had defected to them. Taliban spokesman Zabiullah Mujahid claimed that the commander had defected to the group, but when media contacted her, she categorically rejected the reports over the telephone.

== See also ==
- Afghan National Army
- Khatool Mohammadzai
- Latifa Nabizada
- Niloofar Rahmani
- Women's rights in Afghanistan
