= Afghan Air Force =

Aerial service branch of the Afghan military

Air Force of the Islamic Emirate of Afghanistan
- د افغانستان اسلامي امارت هوایي ځواک (Pashto) قوای هوایی امارت اسلامی افغانستان (Dari)
- Founded: 1921; 105 years ago
- Country: Afghanistan
- Type: Air force
- Role: Aerial warfare
- Part of: Afghan Armed Forces
- Headquarters: Kabul
- Colours: Grey
- Equipment: 34 aircraft
- Engagements: List of wars involving Afghanistan; Khost rebellion (1924–1925); Urtatagai conflict (1925–1926); Soviet–Afghan War; Afghan Civil War (1989–1992); Afghan Civil War (1992–1996); Afghan Civil War (1996–2001); War in Afghanistan (2001–2021); 2021 Taliban offensive; Republican insurgency in Afghanistan; Islamic State–Taliban conflict; 2026 Afghanistan–Pakistan war

Commanders
- Commander-in-Chief of the Air Force: Abdul Ghaffar Mohammadi Noorzai
- Notable commanders: Colonel General Abdul Qadir; Lieutenant General Abdul Fahim Ramin

Insignia
- Roundel (limited usage)

- Fin flash

Aircraft flown
- Attack helicopter: Mil Mi-24, McDonnell Douglas MD 500 Defender
- Utility helicopter: Mil Mi-8, Mil Mi-17, Sikorsky UH-60 Black Hawk
- Trainer: Aero L-39 Albatros
- Transport: Antonov An-26, Antonov An-32, Cessna 208 Caravan

The Afghan Air Force (Pashto: د افغانستان اسلامي امارت هوایي ځواک, Dari: قوای هوایی امارت اسلامی افغانستان) is the air force branch of the Afghan Armed Forces.

The Royal Afghan Air Force was established in 1921 under the reign of King Amanullah and significantly modernized by King Zahir Shah in the 1960s. During the 1980s, the Soviet Union built up the Afghan Air Force, first in an attempt to defeat the mujahideen and in hopes that strong Afghan airpower would preserve the pro-Soviet government of Mohammad Najibullah. When Najibullah eventually fell in 1992 the Afghan Air Force may have counted 350 aircraft. The collapse of Najibullah's government in 1992 and the continuation of a civil war throughout the 1990s reduced the number of Afghan aircraft to some 35–40. During Operation Enduring Freedom in late 2001, in which the Taliban government was ousted from power, all that remained of the AAF was a few helicopters.

In 2006, the Afghan National Army Air Corps was established, and was renamed the Afghan Air Force in 2010 while remaining part of the Afghan National Army. Since 2007, the U.S.-led Combined Air Power Transition Force, renamed the NATO Air Training Command-Afghanistan in 2010, aimed to rebuild and modernize the Afghan Air Force. It served as the air component of the NATO Combined Security Transition Command-Afghanistan which was responsible for organising the Afghan Armed Forces. The AAF possessed 161 aircraft in 2021 and had in 2020 over 7,500 personnel. The Resolute Support Mission intended to raise the ranks of the AAF to 8,000 airmen and increase the number of aircraft, which were progressively getting more advanced.

Following the withdrawal of NATO forces in the summer of 2021, in addition to a large-scale offensive by the Taliban, the mostly non-functional Air Force largely disintegrated. This culminated in the Fall of Kabul and President Ashraf Ghani fleeing to the United Arab Emirates. Large numbers of airmen either fled the country or stood down in the face of the Taliban, with many fixed and rotary-wing aircraft being destroyed or captured by the Taliban. Many other fixed and rotary-wing aircraft had flown to neighboring countries. It was reported that 46 aircraft (22 fixed-wing and 24 helicopters) have so far ended up at Termez Airport in Uzbekistan. After the takeover, the Taliban expressed their intention to rebuild the Afghan Air Force and had called on US-trained Afghan pilots to return to Afghanistan.

== History ==
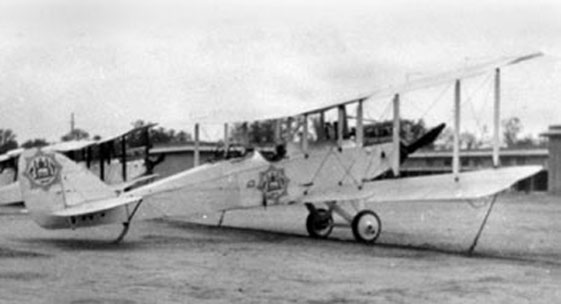
An Avro 504 was one of the first aircraft to be used by the Afghan Air Force.

In July 1921, the RSFSR promised to deliver aircraft free of charge to the Afghan government. In 1924 and 1925 the new air force first saw action when it fought against the Khost rebellion. From 1921, the Soviet Union and the United Kingdom provided a small number of aircraft to King Amanullah Khan; who had been impressed with British India's use of aircraft against the Emirate of Afghanistan's forces in 1919, during the Third Anglo-Afghan War. However, the aircraft he was given were not made into a separate air arm until 1924. For the next decade, Soviet pilots performed the bulk of the flying and equipping for the AAF, probably about one-half of the aircraft were Polikarpov R-1s, a Soviet copy of the de Havilland DH.9A. Most AAF aircraft were destroyed in the civil war that began in December 1928, and it was not before 1937 that a serious rebuilding effort began. From the late 1930s until World War II, British Hawker Hind and Italian IMAM Ro.37 aircraft constituted the bulk of the Afghan Air Force, which by 1938 amounted to about 30 planes in service. The Hawker Hind remained in the Afghan inventory until 1957, and as of 2009 one former Afghan Air Force Hawker Hind still flew in the Shuttleworth Collection. In 1947, the Air Force was redesignated the Royal Afghan Air Force (RAAF), a title it retained until further political upheaval in 1973.

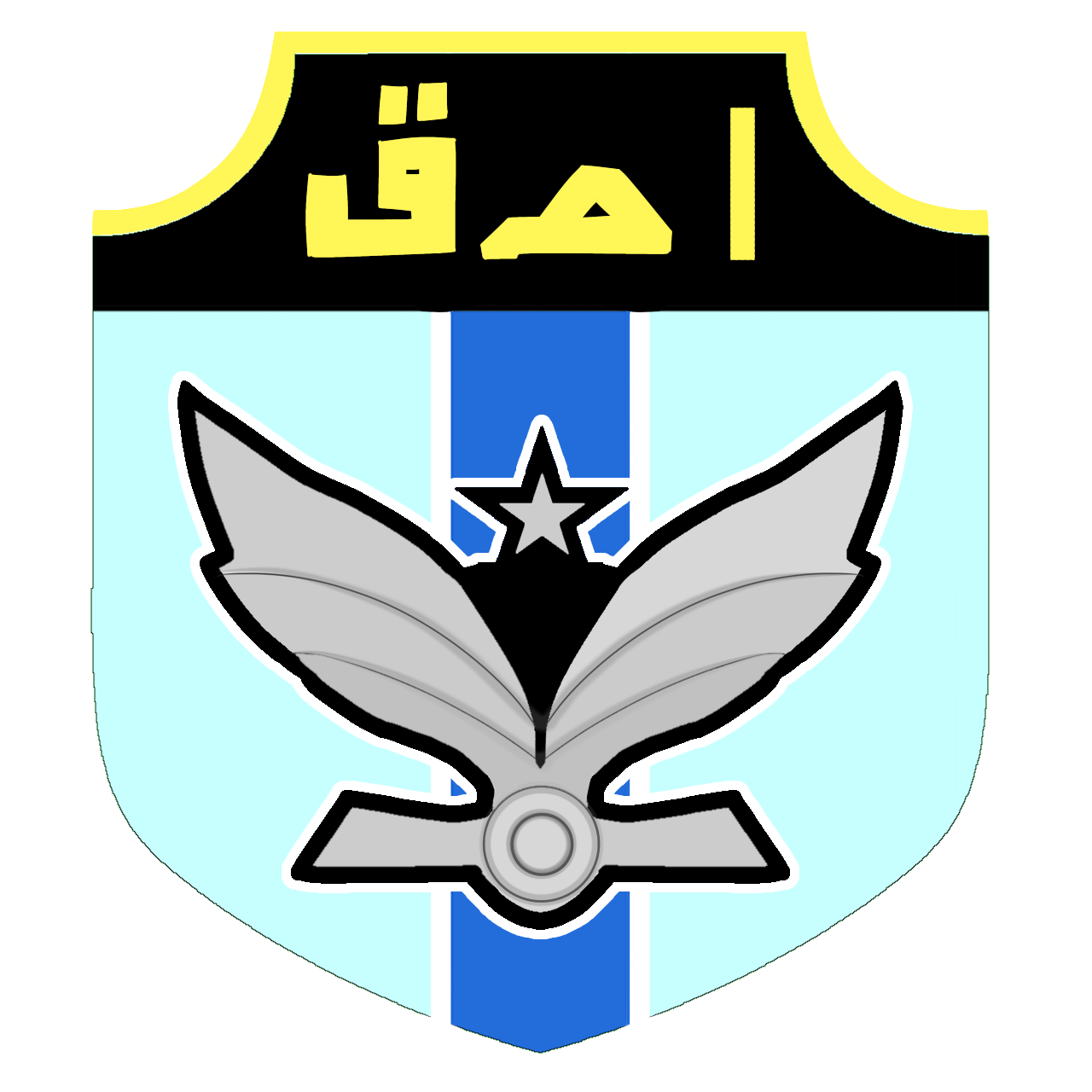
The Royal Afghan Air Force sleeve patch in 1961

By 1960, the Royal Afghan Air Force consisted of approximately 100 combat aircraft including MiG-15 fighters, Il-28 light bombers, transports, and a few helicopters. Also by that time, a small number of Afghan pilots were undergoing undergraduate pilot training in the United States, while others attended training in the Soviet Union, India, and several European countries. In 1973 King Zahir Shah was deposed and Mohammed Daoud Khan became the country's president. During his five years in power, until the Saur Revolution of 1978, Daoud gained Soviet assistance to upgrade the capabilities and increase the size of the Afghan Air Force, introducing newer models of Soviet MiG-21 fighters and An-24 and An-26 transports. In 1979 the Air Force lost four Mi-8s. Improvements in the early-to-mid-1970s notwithstanding, the Air Force remained relatively small until after the 1979–80 Soviet intervention in Afghanistan. While the Afghan Air Force was equipped with a large inventory – probably some 400 aircraft in the mid-1980s – many of them were crewed and maintained by advisors from Czechoslovakia and Cuba. In many cases, the Soviets were reluctant to entrust Afghan pilots with either the latest aircraft models or high priority missions and, indeed, a number of Afghan pilots were equally reluctant to conduct air strikes against their countrymen. The Afghan Air Force was at its strongest in the 1980s and early 1990s, producing some concern on the part of neighboring countries. The Air Force had at least 7,000 personnel plus 5,000 foreign advisors. At its peak, the Air Force had at least 240 fixed-wing fighters, fighter-bombers and light bombers. Midway through the Soviet–Afghan War, one estimate listed the following inventory:

- 90 Mikoyan-Gurevich MiG-17s
- 45 MiG-21s – in 1990, three squadrons were reported at Bagram Airfield
- 60 Su-7s and Su-17s – Warplane, a British partwork, reported in its issue 21, published in 1985, that some 48 Su-7BMs, without Su-7UM two-seaters, had been supplied from 1970, forming the equipment of two fighter/ground attack squadrons at Shindand Airbase.
- 45+ Sukhoi Su-22s
- 150 Mil Mi-8s and Mil Mi-24s
- 40 Antonov An-26, Antonov An-24, and Antonov An-2 transport aircraft

Additionally, the Afghan Air Force probably operated some 40 or more transports, including the Antonov An-26, Antonov An-24, and Antonov An-2. Another estimate in 1988 painted a more detailed picture of the Afghan Air Force:

- 322nd Air Regiment, Bagram Air Base, three fighter squadrons with 40 MiG-21s
- 321st Air Regiment, Bagram Air Base, three fighter/bomber squadrons with Su-7/Su-22
- 393rd Air Regiment, Dehdadi Air Base (Balkh), three fighter/bomber squadrons with MiG-17s
- 355th Air Regiment, Shindand Airbase, 3 bomber squadrons with Il-28s and one fighter/bomber squadron with MiG-17s. Russian sources now say that the 335th Mixed Aviation Regiment was armed with up to thirty-two Il-28s, which were based at Shindand. The Il-28 was used in combat until January 1985, when during a sabotage by the mujahideen with the help of bribed guards at the airport, almost all the bombers were destroyed.
- 232nd Air Regiment, Kabul Airport, three helicopter squadrons with Mi-4, Mi-6, and Mi-8 with one squadron of Mi-8s detached to Shindand
- 377th Air Regiment, Kabul Airport, four helicopter squadrons with Mi-25s and Mi-17s
- ? Air Regiment, Kabul Airport, two transport squadrons with An-2, An-26/30, and one VIP transport squadron with one Il-18 and 12 An-14s
- two attack helicopter squadrons with Mi-24s at Jallalabad and Kabul
- Air Force Academy, Kabul, with Yak-18s and L-39s
- Air Defense Forces consisting of two SAM regiments at Kabul, an AAA Battalion at Kandahar, and a radar regiment at Kabul

On February 1, 1986, the staffing of military equipment and personnel of the Air Force and Air Defense was:

- Personnel - 19,400 people
- Aircraft - 226, of which 217 (96%) were combat-ready
- helicopters - 89, of which 62 are combat-ready

The Mil Mi-24 and Mi-35 (export model) attack helicopters have a long history in Afghanistan. The aircraft was operated extensively during the Soviet invasion of Afghanistan, mainly for attacking mujahideen fighters. Early in the war, the only anti-air weapons of the mujahideen were Soviet made shoulder-launched, heat-seeking SAMs and American Redeye, which had either been captured from the Soviets or their Afghan allies or were supplied from Western sources. Many of them came from stocks the Israelis had captured during their wars with Soviet client states in the Middle East. Owing to a combination of the limited capabilities of these early types of missiles, poor training and poor material condition of the missiles, they were not particularly effective.

Beginning in 1986, the US supplied the mujahideen with its state-of-the-art heat-seeking missile, the FIM-92 Stinger, which the Afghans employed with devastating effect. In the first use of the Stinger in Afghanistan, mujahideen fighters downed three of eight unsuspecting Soviet Mi-24 Hinds as they approached the airfield at Jalalabad on a late September afternoon. Some scholars point to that event in 1986 as the turning point in the war. Moreover, for most of the remainder of the war when Stingers were known to be present, Soviet and Afghan aircraft elected to remain at higher altitudes where they were less vulnerable to the missile, but also less effective in ground attacks. Although employed extensively throughout the war as a ground attack platform, the Hind suffered from a weak tail boom and was found to be underpowered for some missions it was called upon to perform in the mountains of Afghanistan, where high density altitude is especially problematic for rotary-wing aircraft.

Overall, the Hind proved effective and very reliable, earning the respect of both Soviet and Afghan pilots as well as ordinary Afghans throughout the country. The mujahideen nicknamed the Mi-24 the "Devil's Chariot" due to its notorious reputation.

After the Soviet withdrawal and the departure of foreign advisors, the Air Force declined in terms of operational capability. With the collapse of the Najibullah Government in 1992, the Air Force splintered, breaking up amongst the different mujahideen factions in the ongoing civil war. By the end of the 1990s, the Taliban maintained five supersonic MiG-21MF and 10 Sukhoi Su-22 fighter-bombers. They also held six Mil Mi-8 helicopters, five Mi-35s, five L-39Cs, six An-12s, 25 An-26s, a dozen An-24/32s, an IL-18, and a Yakovlev. The Afghan Northern Alliance/United Front operated a small number of helicopters and transports and a few other aircraft for which it depended on assistance from neighboring Tajikistan.

From the Saur Revolution until the Fall of Kabul in April of 1992, the Afghan Air Force lost 617 aircraft and 651 crew members. Many were shot down by American Stinger missiles provided to the Mujahideen through Operation Cyclone.

While the land forces, the army, changed fundamentally under the Taliban from 1996 to 2001, the air force was an exception in that the old structures and chain of command were maintained. With its founding in 1994 the Taliban invited former Communist Pilots to join their ranks which many Khalqists and Pashtun Parchamites willingly accepted due to ethnic solidarity or a despise for the Mujahedeen warlords who had not brought peace to the nation.

With the breakdown of logistical systems, the cannibalization of surviving airframes was widespread. The US air campaign in the fall of 2001 destroyed most of the remaining Afghan aircraft.

=== Civil Aviation Service ===
After the end of the Soviet war in 1989 and collapse of Najibullah's government, the Taliban took over Kabul in 1996. Afghanistan faced substantial economic sanctions from the international sector during the Taliban regime. The sanctions, along with the Taliban government's control of Ariana Afghan Airlines and the grounding of many of the carrier's international flights, had a devastating effect on the economic health of the company through the 1990s. The fleet was reduced to only a handful of Russian and Ukrainian built An-26s, Yak-40s and three Boeing 727s, which were used on the longest domestic routes and military transport roles. With no overseas assets, by 1999 Ariana's international operations consisted of flights to Dubai only; also, limited cargo flights continued into China's western provinces. However, sanctions imposed by UN Security Council Resolution 1267 forced the airline to suspend overseas operations. In November 2001, Ariana was grounded completely.

According to the Los Angeles Times:

With the Taliban's blessing, Bin Laden effectively had hijacked Ariana, the national civilian airline of Afghanistan. For four years, according to former U.S. aides and exiled Afghan officials, Ariana's passenger and charter flights ferried Islamic militants, arms, cash and opium through the United Arab Emirates and Pakistan. Members of Bin Laden's Al Qaeda terrorist network were provided false Ariana identification that gave them free run of airports in the Middle East.

According to people interviewed by the Los Angeles Times, Viktor Bout's companies helped in running the airline.

=== 21st century ===
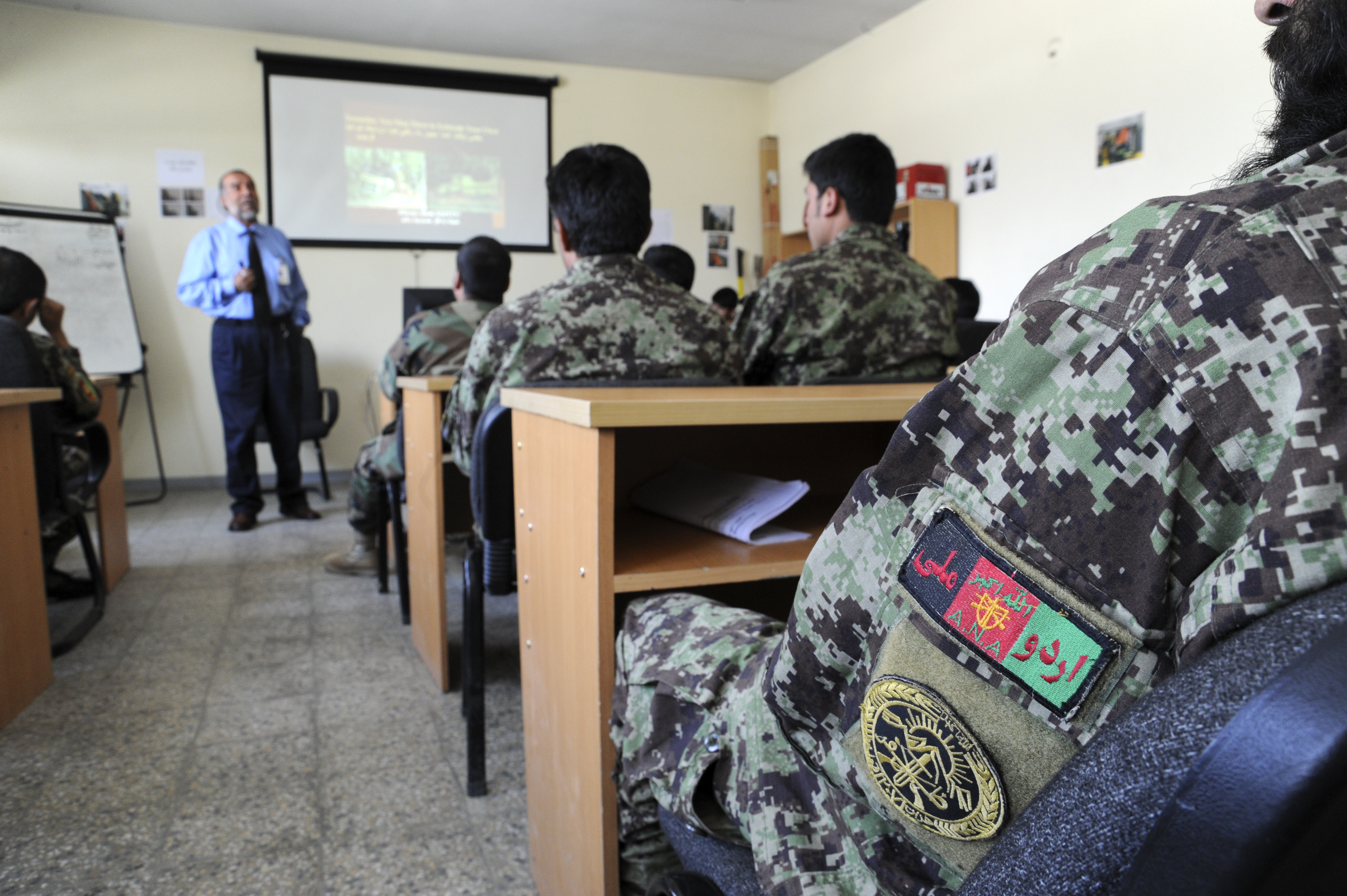
Firefighting students at the Air Force University in 2011

It was 2005 before a US-led, international effort began to rebuild the Afghan Air Force. Marion writes:

In 2005, the Americans took the first tentative steps to reestablishing an Afghan presidential airlift capability in keeping with a directive from U.S. Secretary of Defense Donald Rumsfeld. In May 2005, Afghan officials named Major General Dawran the commander of the new Afghan Air Corps. Later that year, a small team led by Colonel John Hansen, U.S. Army, began working with Afghan airmen at Kabul International Airport. By mid-2006, Colonel Hansen had developed a plan for the Air Corps that became the basis for the Combined Air Power Transition Force (CAPTF) that began work the following year.

For the first time in over two decades Afghanistan began training new pilots. In January 2008, President Hamid Karzai said that his country's Air Force had been reborn after inaugurating its new headquarters at Kabul International Airport freshly equipped with new aircraft. It had received 26 new and refurbished aircraft, including Czech-donated Mi-35 Hind helicopter gunships. With United States funding, the Afghan government had also acquired transport helicopters and a number of Ukrainian military aircraft.

The North Kabul International Airport cantonment area included the new headquarters for the Afghan Air Force and 201st Kabul Air Wing. The wing's three operational squadrons, one fixed-wing, one rotary-wing, and the Presidential Airlift Squadron, were housed there. The cantonment area includes state-of-the-art hangars as well as operations, logistics, billeting, dining, and recreational facilities. Extensive AAF facilities were also constructed at Kandahar International Airport.

A number of Afghan pilots and pilot-candidates travelled to the United States beginning in May 2009 for English language training, to be followed by instrument training for the pilots and undergraduate pilot training for the pilot-candidates. This was the start of an initiative that, within the following years, was to produce a small cadre of seasoned, instrument-rated Afghan Air Force pilots as well as a larger number of younger, well-trained pilots to serve as the backbone of the Afghan Air Force for the next generation. Other NATC-A-led programs include English language and technical courses for AAF personnel in various specialties including aircraft maintenance, logistics, communications, and engineering. As of June 2009, the Air Force numbered about 2,400 airmen, with a planned strength of 7,400 airmen within several years.

In late 2009, the AAF began receiving refurbished former Italian Air Force Aeritalia G.222 tactical transports, named C-27 in U.S. service, and Mi-17V5 Hip transport helicopters. In June 2010, the Afghan National Army Air Corps (ANAAC) was renamed the Afghan Air Force (AAF) by order of Afghan President Hamid Karzai. Also in the same year, a number of female trainers completed their courses and were commissioned as lieutenants. More were being trained as the numbers of air force personnel increased.

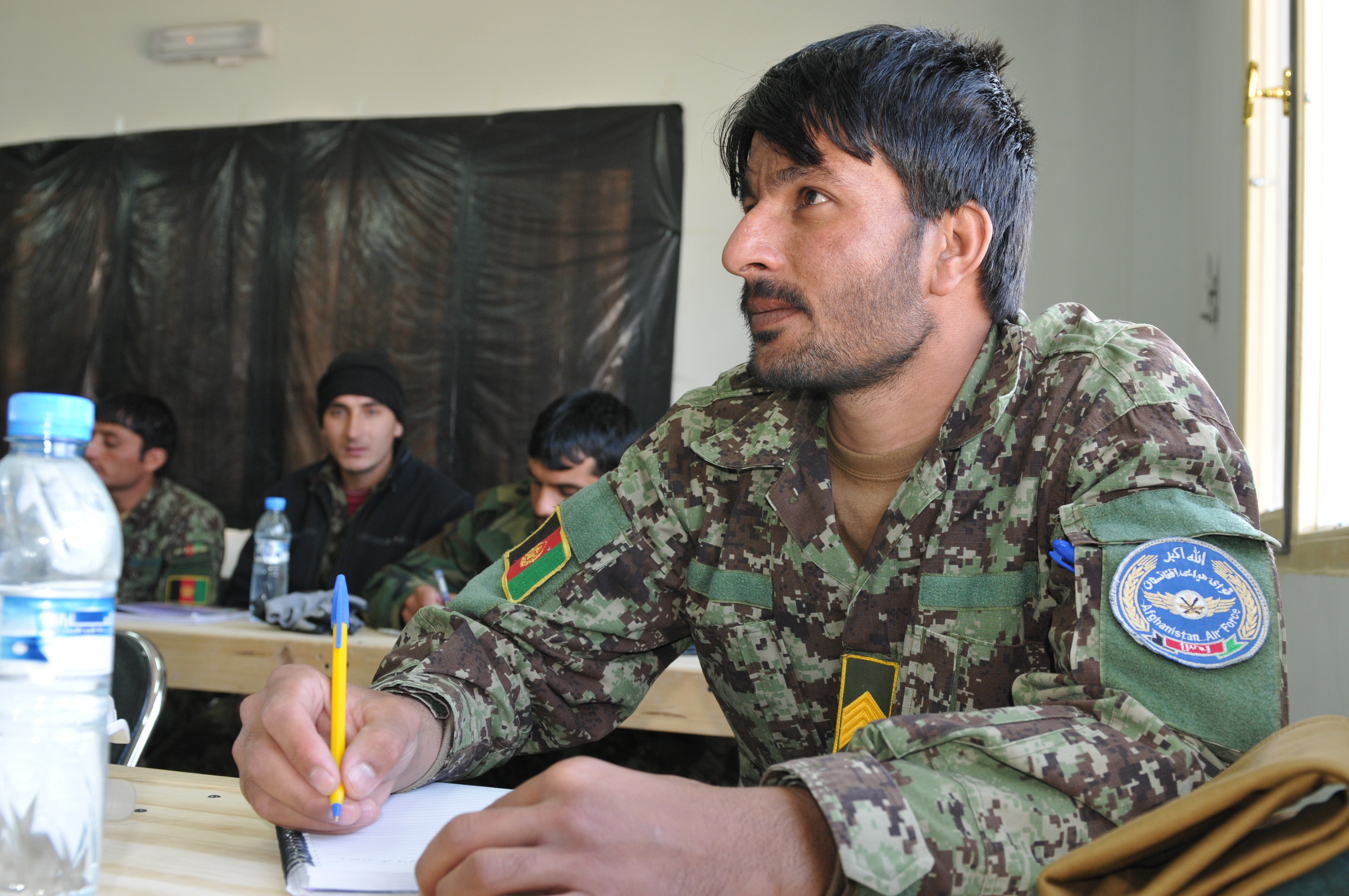
Former Air Force Sergeant Khudainazer attends civil engineering course at Kandahar Air Wing. Note wording of "Afghanistan Air Force" patch; "Afghan" is not a demonym used in Dari/Pashto.

As of March 2011, the Afghan Air Force (AAF) had 44 rotary-wing and 13 fixed-wing aircraft in serviceable condition. By the end of 2011, the AAF had 16 C-27As (on loan from the U.S. government) and 35 of the new Mi-8 Hips while continuing to operate the older Mi-17s and retiring the An-32 fleet. Further growth of the AAF depended on decisions regarding the size of the Afghan National Army which, in turn, determined AAF requirements. In a country of rugged terrain possessing limited ground transportation options, the Afghan Armed Forces depends heavily upon AAF fixed- and rotary-wing aircraft for airlift of soldiers and supplies between corps operating locations, medical and casualty evacuation, and transport of human remains. The Afghan government also relied on the AAF for transportation of election materials during the 2009 presidential election. It was announced in October 2011 that the Afghan Air Force would be provided with 145 multi-type aircraft and 21 helicopters. By the end of 2011, the Afghan Air Force had a total of 4,900 airmen and personnel.

By 2016 the Afghan Air Force was planned to expand to 8,000 airmen and 145 operational aircraft. To that end there was continuing expansion in infrastructure, training and maintenance facilities. The US also purchased modern equipment and aircraft including Russian Mi-17 helicopters. Significant investment went into purchasing modern training aircraft such as MD 500 helicopters and fixed-wing Cessna 182 and 208 planes.

In 2016–17, the United States Department of Defense (DOD) aimed to procure 30 additional armed MD-530F helicopters and 6 additional A-29 attack aircraft to replace the Mil Mi-35 in service with the AAF. DOD asked for funds to add an additional five AC-208s to the fleet. The requested FY2017 Afghan Security Forces Fund (ASFF) budget, including the 23 additional funds for the first year of the planned procurement, went to Congress on 10 November 2016.

As part of the 2021 Taliban offensive, Taliban fighters targeted Afghan Air Force pilots. Many pilots escaped to Uzbekistan and Tajikistan, bringing a number the AAF aircraft with them. Satellite pictures analysis of 16 August indicated that the Termez Airport held multiple AAF aircraft: including various Mi-17, Mi-25 and UH-60 Black Hawk helicopters, as well some A-29s and C-208s airplanes. An Afghan A-29 Super Tucano crashed in Uzbekistan's Surxondaryo Region. Two pilots ejected and landed with parachutes. Initially it was reported shot down by Uzbekistan air defenses, then the Prosecutor General's office in Uzbekistan issued a statement saying that an Afghan military plane had collided mid-air with an Uzbekistan Air Force MiG-29, finally it also retracted the statement about the mid-air collision. Afghan pilots who escaped to Tajikistan were held in a Sanatorium until they were freed in November 2021.

During the final Taliban offensive, the Taliban also deployed a secretive drone unit to attack high value targets such as government officials.

=== After the Taliban takeover ===
On 1 September 2021, the Taliban flew a Black Hawk displaying the flag of the Taliban over Kabul. The top leadership of the Taliban announced their intentions to rebuild the Air Force. They have also encouraged US-trained Afghan pilots to return to Afghanistan. However, only a few pilots have returned since the Taliban takeover.

On 11 January 2022, Taliban's minister of Defense Mullah Yaqoob asked Uzbekistan and Tajikistan to return the aircraft that were used by Afghan pilots to flee the country and warned of repercussions if the aircraft are not returned.

On 6 February 2022, Taliban's Ministry of Defense spokesperson Enayatullah Khwarizmi announced that around five Afghan pilots have returned to the country and resumed their work.

== Structure ==
As of July 2021, the Afghan Air Force had 161 aircraft with, as of May 2020, 7,505 personnel. There are four Afghan Air Force wings:

- Kabul (201st or 1st Wing): fixed-wing squadron, rotary-wing squadron, Presidential Airlift Squadron
- Kandahar (202nd or 2nd Wing): rotary-wing squadron, fixed-wing squadron
- Shindand (203rd or 3rd Wing): training squadron, rotary-wing squadron
- Mazar-i-Sharif (304th or 4th Wing): rotary-wing squadron

The command center of the Afghan Air Force was located at Hamid Karzai International Airport in Kabul. The Shindand Air Base in Herat Province served as the main training facility.

Lt. Gen. Mohammad Dawran was the final Chief of Staff of the Afghan Air Force and Gen. Abdul Fahim Ramin as the final Afghan Air Force Commander. Abdul Raziq Sherzai served as a major general and commander of the Kandahar Air Wing. Abdul Raziq Sherzai is the brother of Nangarhar Province province governor Gul Agha Sherzai.

== 2013–2021 projects ==
In 2013 Afghanistan sent India a large wish-list of equipment which included one An-32 and two squadrons of Mi-17 and Mi-35 helicopters. This deal was initially put on hold due to fears of antagonizing India's regional rival Pakistan, but in 2014 India reached a compromise where instead of directly supplying the equipment it would instead pay Russia to deliver them. The deal included arms, ammunition and the refurbishment of weapon systems and aircraft left behind by the Soviets.

India further agreed to help refurbish older Soviet-era aircraft in Afghan Air Force. As a part of this two Indian Air Force teams visited Afghanistan and identified around 50 aircraft which could be serviced and brought back to active service. This included Mi-25/35, Mi-8 and An-32s aircraft.

=== Fixed-wing attack & trainer ===
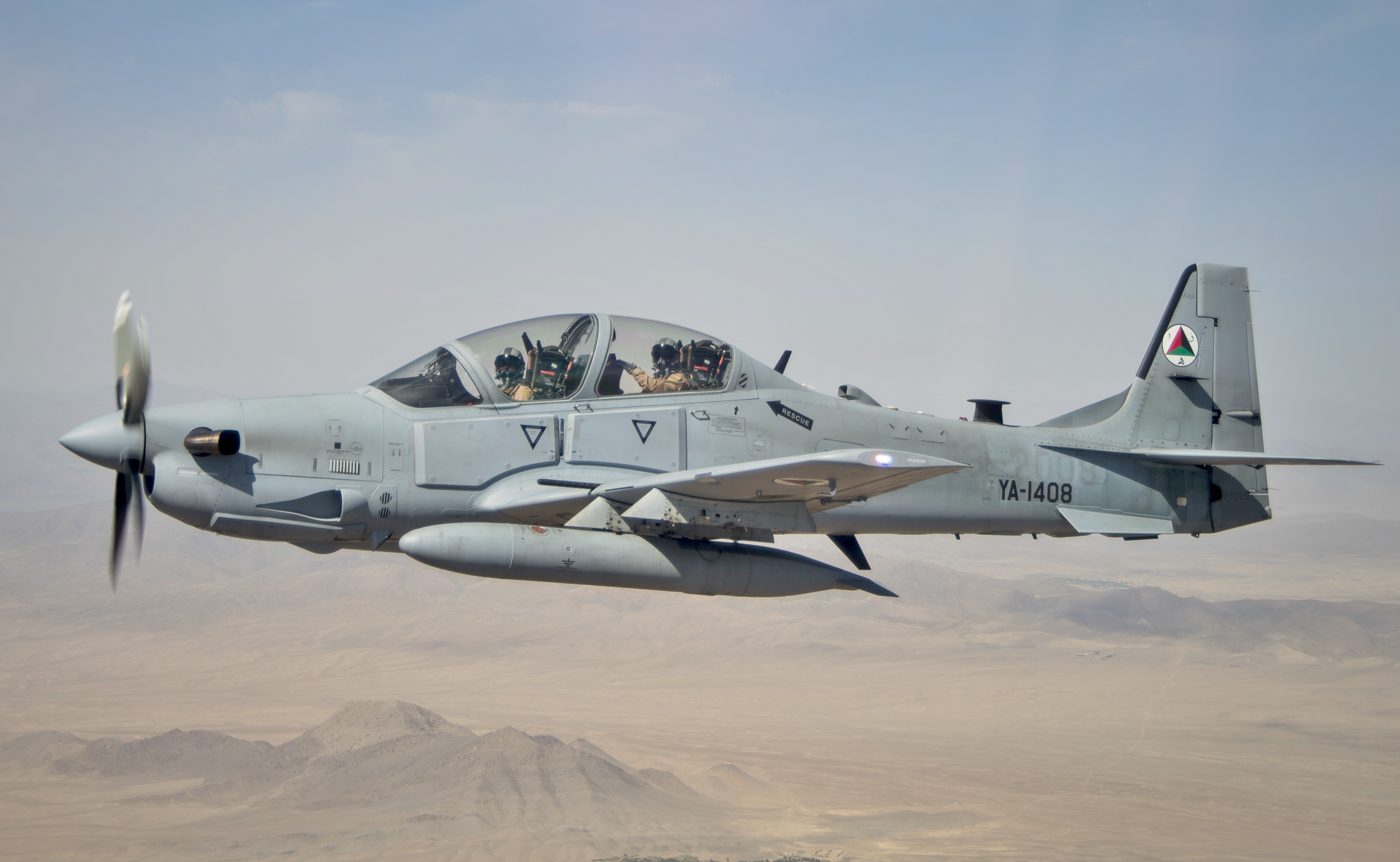
An Afghan A-29 Super Tucano over Kabul, Afghanistan

Twenty attack aircraft that could also be used for training and to provide the Army with close air support were desired. The two contenders were the Embraer A-29 Super Tucano and the Beechcraft AT-6. Embraer won the previous contract but the tendering process was cancelled after it was discovered that proper procedures were not followed. A winner for the new contract was expected in June 2013 with first deliveries expected to begin in the third quarter of 2014, about 15 months after originally planned. The Super Tucano was declared the winner of the contract again in 2013. The contract was to be completed by Sierra Nevada Corp. for 20 A-29 Super Tucanos with an expected delivery date of between December 2015 and 2018. DOD purchased the Super Tucanos for $427 million.

The first ten aircraft were to be stationed at Shindand Air Base, in western Afghanistan. The other 10 were to go to Kandahar Airfield.

Pilot training was undertaken by the U.S. Air Force's 81st Fighter Squadron at Moody Air Force Base, Georgia. On 18 December 2015, the first Super Tucano pilots graduated at Moody AFB. USAF Colonel John Nichols, the 14th Flying Training Wing Commander said of the pilots, "The extraordinary dedication of these pilots and the sacrifices these graduates have made will help establish a secure, stable and unified country". The pilot graduates and the remaining 22 student pilots were to receive further, advisory support in Afghanistan.

The first four aircraft arrived at Hamid Karzai International Airport on 15 January 2016, with a further four due before the end of 2016. Combat-ready Afghan Super Tucano pilots graduated from training at Moody AFB returned to Afghanistan, the first of a total of 30 pilots the USAF trained.

By March 2018, the AAF had 12 Super Tucanos in service. On 22 March 2018, the Afghan Air Force dropped a GBU-58 Paveway II laser-guided bomb from a Super Tucano in combat, for the first time.

=== Air mobility ===
The U.S. Navy equipped the Afghan Air Force with refurbished An-32 transport aircraft during initial reconstruction efforts. These aircraft augmented an existing fleet of An-32 and An-26 aircraft. The An-32 was retired on 17 June 2011 in a push to move operations over to the C27 program but like the L-39, it is still kept in ready status by the Afghan Air Force.

The United States purchased the C-27A to move the AAF away from Soviet aircraft. A total of 20 former Italian military C-27As were purchased with the intent of providing the Afghan Air Force a fleet that would last 10 years. However, the prime contractor in the refurbishment and supply of the planes, Alenia Aermacchi North America, a unit of Italian defense conglomerate Finmeccanica S.p.A., was unable to provide adequate maintenance support for the aircraft. As a result, the majority of the fleet at any time was grounded for safety of flight issues (including a period where the entire fleet was grounded for over six months). The US military worked over the course of three years with Alenia North America to get the fleet fully operational.

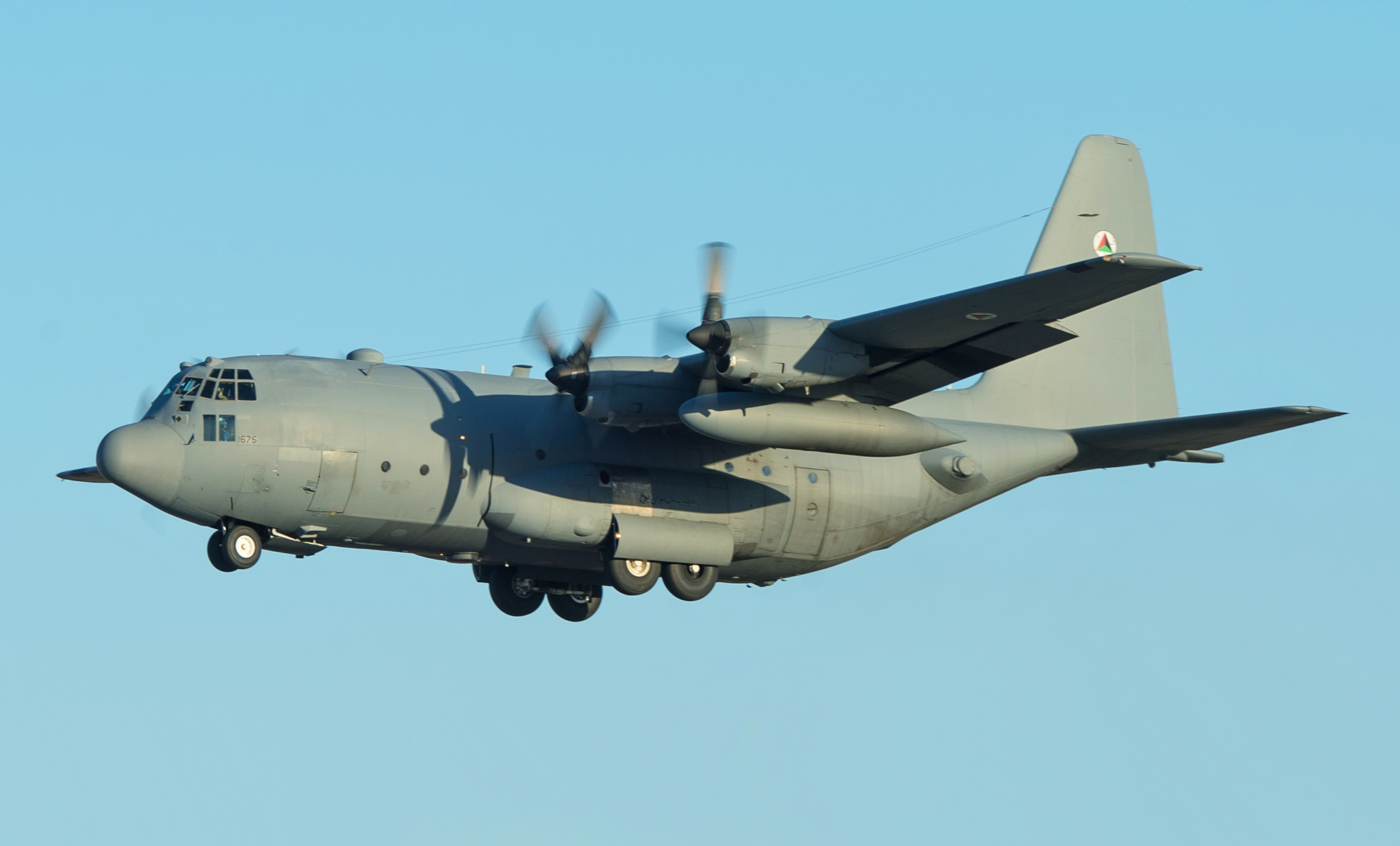
C-130H landing at Bagram Airfield in May 2015

Part of the issues with supplying the C-27As came about from ownership. The C-27A program included an initial parts supply and training contract for the Afghan Air Force. Upon arrival of the first two aircraft in November 2009, Brig. Gen. Michael R. Boera, commanding general, Combined Air Power Transition Force and commander of the 438th Air Expeditionary Wing announced that the aircraft were part of the Afghan National Army Air Corps in a ceremony at Kabul International Airport. The contract for the aircraft, a 14-month effort, had the U.S. government as the end user of the aircraft due to an Italian arms embargo with Afghanistan. The U.S. declaration that the C-27A was now an Afghan Air Force asset effectively violated international law and the Italian government enforced the embargo and stopped shipment of contracted supplies to Afghanistan. This put the U.S. government in a dilemma since the $290 million contract was funded through the Afghanistan Security Forces Fund (ASFF) which required, by U.S. law, that all military materials purchased be turned over to the Afghan government.

The C-27A was eventually determined to be a U.S. owned asset utilized by the Afghan Air Force with intent to turn over the asset in the future. This determination assumed that the Italian embargo would at some point be lifted, or that enough supplies could be stock piled to take the aircraft through its expected 10-year service life, but that determination was not immediate. This caused a delay of contracted goods beyond the time frame of the initial contract through no fault of the contractor, and made it necessary for the U.S. government to enter into a second more costly maintenance contract with Alenia North America to get aircraft operational. Since the C-27A aircraft purchased still had Italian military air worthiness certificates controlled by the company, Alenia North America effectively monopolized the entire supply chain making fair competition non-existent. This second contract inflated the total program cost to over $600 million, and it would have cost over $1.2 billion had the U.S. opted to extend the contract up to 10 years.

The contract with Alenia North America was eventually terminated. It was announced that the contractor had failed to meet their legal obligations, and that the Afghan Air Force would receive four Lockheed C-130 Hercules transport aircraft, expected in 2013. The G-222 program legacy to the C-130 is that the cockpit and cargo compartment configurations of the C-27A are similar to that of a C-130H. The C-27A simulator program, contracted to Fidelity Technologies Corporation, produced three C-27A simulators: one Fuselage Load Trainer (cargo compartment), one Flight Training Device (cockpit), and one Basic Aircraft Training Device (cockpit). These training devices were built to FAA standards from two derelict U.S. Air Force C-27A aircraft and allowed the Afghan Air Force to continue to train while the C-27A fleet was effectively out of service for over a year, making transition to the C-130 a feasible alternative.

=== Helicopters ===
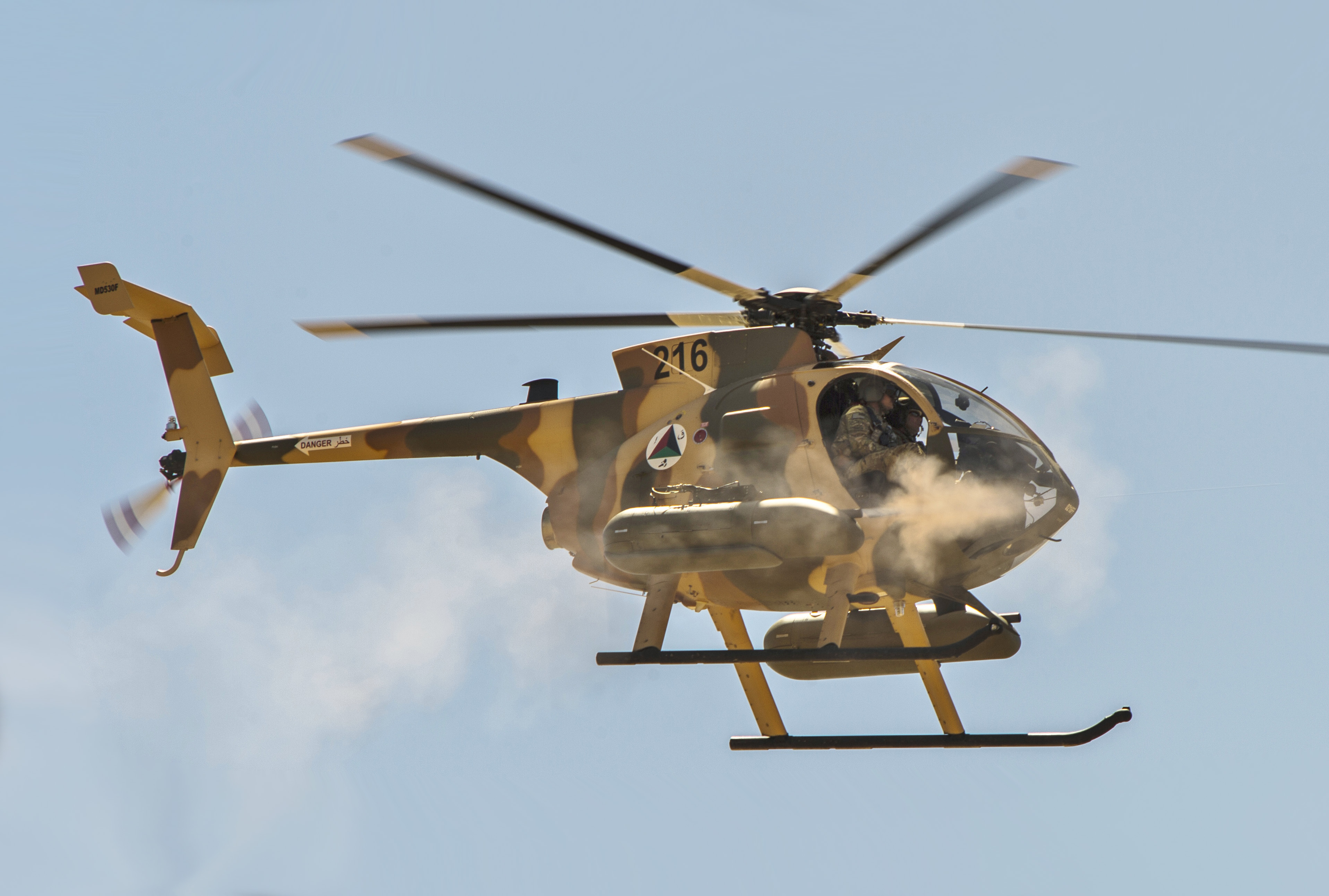
Afghan MD 530F firing off its gun pods

The Mi-17 was in service with the Afghan Air Force since the late 1970s (four were damaged or destroyed in combat as early as 1979). DOD purchased a number of new Mi-17s for the AAF from Russia, the Czech Republic and Slovakia. At least two Mi-17s were reported to have crashed during the Afghanistan War.

The most recent DOD acquisition of Mi-17s was for 21 airframes, spare parts and training. These all include western avionics. Eighteen of these were delivered in 2012. As part of the contract, there was also an option for another twelve Mi-17s, raising the contract to 33. They were modified in the UAE after being delivered to the US Army to fit Afghan Air Force requirements better before being sent to Afghanistan.

The Afghan Air Force possessed two Mi-17v5 Flight Training Devices, one Mi-17v5 Basic Aircraft Training Device, and one Mi-17 Cockpit Procedure Trainer built by Fidelity Technologies Corporation. The Air Force was expected be in possession of 46 Mi-17 helicopters by June 2012, with an additional 10 to be delivered by 2016.

In 2017 the decision was made to transition from Russian to U.S. helicopters due to issues with sourcing parts and maintenance because of ongoing diplomatic issues between the US, the AAF main source of funds, and Russia. Consequently, it was decided to replace the AAF Mi-17s with refurbished UH-60 Black Hawk helicopters. The US Department of Defense (DoD) requested $814.5M for 2017, the first year of the plan, to re-equip the Afghan Air Force and to provide funding to procure 53 UH-60s, with refurbishment and modification of the first 18. Long term the US planned to provide 159 UH-60 Black Hawks with funding for the first 53 already being secured in the 2017 budget, however, the DoD would have had to request additional funds each year to procure the rest of the proposed aircraft. Deliveries were expected to start in 2019 with 30 helicopters expected to be delivered each year. The UH-60s were also to be fitted with rocket pods to increase their offensive capability and the first four UH-60s slated for training were expected to arrive in Afghanistan in autumn 2017. The refurbished helicopters would have been 1980s UH-60As with new engines with the most likely choice being the General Electric T-700-GE-701C, which is found on the U.S. Army's newer UH-60Ls and Ms, as well as the up-coming UH-60V model.

The Czech Republic supplied five Mi-35 attack helicopters in 2008. Between 2015 and 2018, India donated eight Mi-35s. In 2019, the DoD reported that it did not provide any funding or advisory support for the Mi-35s and that the Mi-35 had been "removed from the authorized fleet in 2015 but the Afghans continue to attempt to sustain them". In 2021, it was reported that the helicopters donated by India were grounded due to a lack of Russian spare parts.

In 2015, the AAF received the first 6 armed MD-530F Cayuse Warrior helicopters known in Dari as the 'Jengi'. The last 5 of a total of 60 MD-530Fs were received in 2019. The MD-530Fs could be equipped with a FN Herstal HMP 400 .50 BMG caliber machine gun pod and a M260 7-shot rocket pod. Prior to 2015, the AAF had operated five unarmed MD-530 helicopters to train pilots.

== Training ==
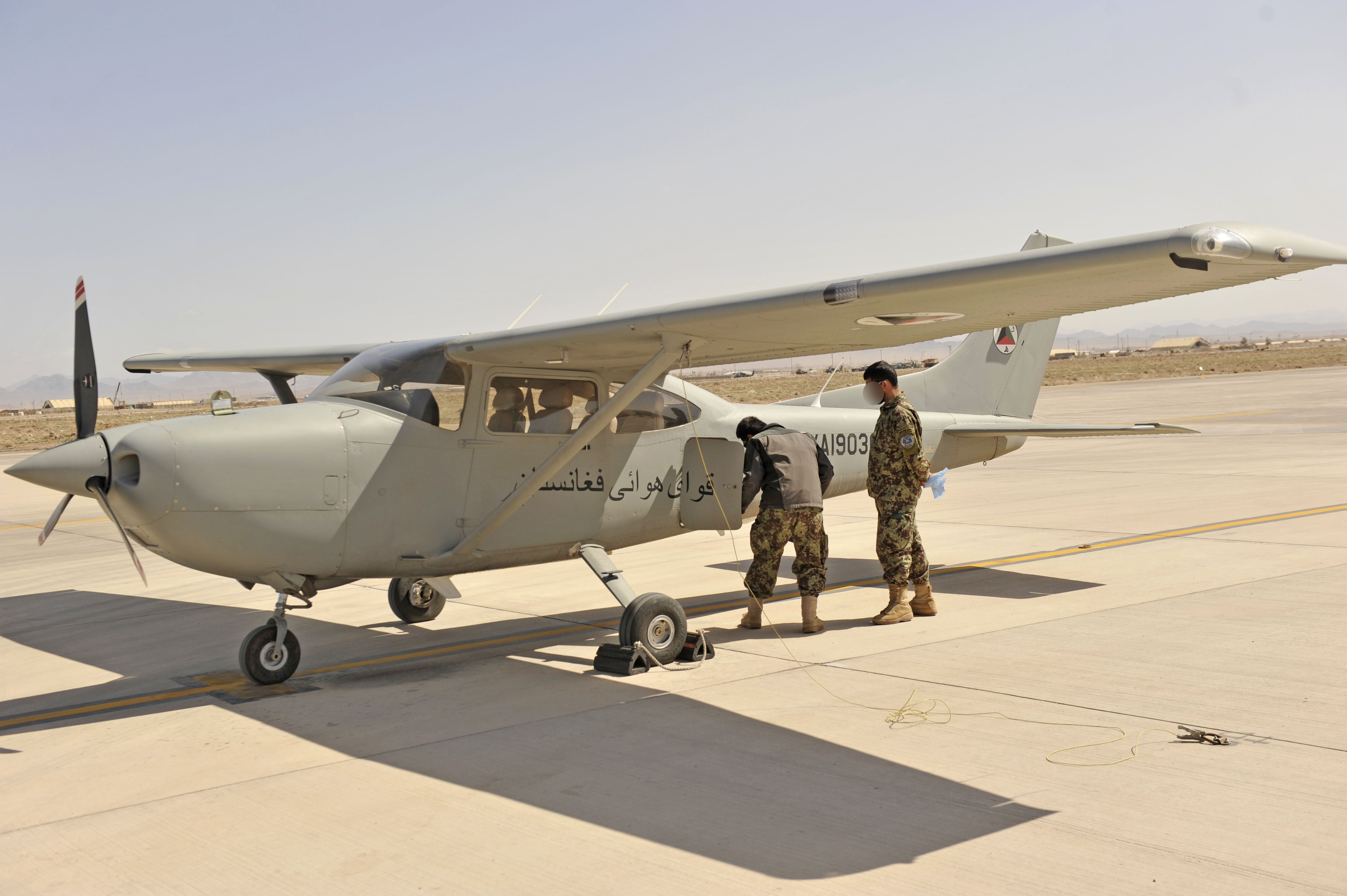
Cessna 182 at Shindand Airbase, March 2014

Training was undertaken at the Shindand Air Wing at Shindand Air Base in western Afghanistan. The base which had been refurbished and expanded by NATO was tripled its initial size. The seven candidates were all graduates of the National Military Academy of Afghanistan or Initial Officer Training held in the United Kingdom and also undertook English language training in the Kabul English Language Training Center. Students were to be trained in both fixed-wing aircraft, namely the Cessna 182T and 208B and in rotary wing aircraft, the MD 530F. About 6 MD 530F helicopters were delivered to Shindand in late 2011. The initial 6 helicopters completed acceptance flights and were in a condition to be used to begin training AAF pilots, although one was destroyed in 2013 by an IED. The four-year contract could’ve seen as many as 54 other helicopters being supplied to the AAF.

With the delivery of 20 advanced fixed-wing light support aircraft, a plan was made for the A-29 Super Tucano Afghan pilots to undergo further training. This would’ve significantly increased the level of knowledge and experience in the AAF.

== Aircraft ==
The Afghan Air Force (AAF) deteriorated following the collapse of Najibullah's government in 1992, and it was nearly eliminated by US/Coalition air strikes during Operation Enduring Freedom in late 2001. The new NATO-assembled Afghan Air Force gradually increased its aircraft inventory, personnel, and operational capabilities since at least 2007. The last addition of aircraft was made in December 2011, which included 12 trainers and 6 helicopters from the United States.

=== Inventory before the 2021 Taliban offensive ===
Prior to the hostilities, in July 2021 the Afghan Air Force had 131 usable or in-country aircraft including 23 A-29 Super Tucanos, 3 C-130s, 23 Cessna 208s, 10 AC-208s, 12 Mil Mi-17s, 28 UH-60 Blackhawks, and 42 MD 530 helicopters. In July 2020, the Special Mission Wing (SMW), a separate subordinate formation of the Afghan National Army that conducted special operations aviation missions, had four Mi-17 squadrons and one Pilatus PC-12 squadron. The number of SMW aircraft was classified, however, it has been reported that the number of PC-12s was 18 with 61% of them operational.

During the Taliban offensive of 2021 several helicopters including UH-60 Black Hawks and Mil Mi-17s were destroyed, while other helicopters including Mil Mi-24, MD 530F Cayuse Warrior, UH-60 Black Hawk and Mil Mi-17 were also captured by the Taliban.

Throughout the Fall of Kabul, at least 22 fixed wing and 24 helicopters carrying 585 Afghans fled to Uzbekistan. One Afghan Embraer EMB 314 Super Tucano crashed after crossing the border, Uzbek authorities issued conflicting reports on the cause. Two Afghan military planes carrying over 100 soldiers also landed in the Tajik city of Bokhtar.

Initial estimates of AAF aircraft captured by the Taliban, according to photographic/video evidence, included 13 aircraft, 38 helicopters, seven Boeing Insitu ScanEagle UAVs, and 73 additional aircraft reportedly disabled by U.S. forces before they departed.

=== Aircraft flown out ===
On 17 August 2021, it was reported that elements of the Afghan Air Force (AAF) fled to Uzbekistan and Tajikistan on board 22 fixed-wing planes and 26 helicopters from the former AAF including A-29 Super Tucano, Cessna AC-208 Caravans, Pilatus PC-12NG, Mi-8/Mi-17s Hip, UH-60 Black Hawk, and MD 530F Little Bird. As the AAF fled to neighboring countries, one A-29 Super Tucano crashed in Uzbekistan, while six landed safely. 7 UH-60s fled to Uzbekistan.

On 20 November 2021, it was reported that ex-Afghan Air Force aircraft - three Russian made Mi-17 Hip helicopters - had arrived at Davis-Monthan Air Force Base aka "The Boneyard". Based on radar data, they're believed to have come from Uzbekistan.

On 10 December 2021, it was disclosed that a further 17 helicopters, ex-Afghan Air Force, have arrived at Davis-Monthan Air Force Base over the past few weeks. They included an additional four Mi-17 Hip transport helicopters and 17 MD 530F Little Bird armed light helicopters. This increased the total number of former Afghan Air Force aircraft, brought back to the U.S. to 24 aircraft - all helicopters. 37 UH-60A+ Black Hawk helicopters are being stored in the U.S. as their delivery was cancelled, while it's believed the seven Black Hawks that fled Afghanistan may be returned to the same unknown location where the 37 never delivered Black Hawks are kept. Six helicopters, including three UH-60A+ Black Hawks and three Mi-17s, were undergoing maintenance outside of Afghanistan when the country fell and it's unknown whether these Mi-17s were part of the airlifts that brought the additional four Mi-17s to Davis-Monthan Air Force Base over the past few weeks.

=== Current inventory ===
There are varying reports that some fixed wing aircraft and helicopters are in flying condition. These include Cessna 208s, Antonov An-26/An-32s, Mi-8/17s, Mi-24s, MD500 Defenders, UH-60 Black Hawks, and a ScanEagle UAV.

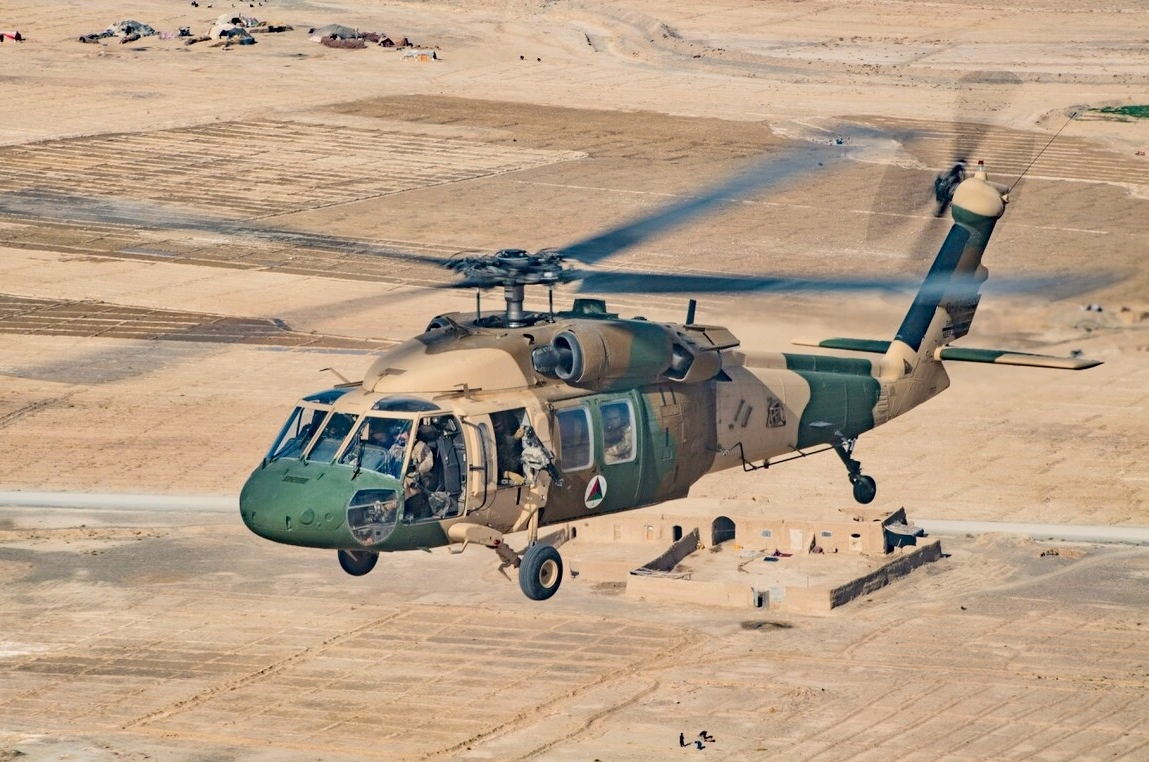
UH-60A Black Hawk

Aircraft	Origin	Type	Variant	In service	Notes
Combat aircraft
Embraer EMB 314 Super Tucano	Brazil	Light attack		1	
Transport
Antonov An-26	Soviet Union	Transport		1	
Antonov An-32	Soviet Union	Transport		2	
Cessna 208	United States	Transport / Utility		6	
Helicopters
MD500 Defender	United States	Light attack / Trainer	MD 530F	5	
Mil Mi-8	Russia	Utility	Mi-17	7	
SA 315B Lama	India	Utility	Cheetal	3	
Mil Mi-24	Russia	Attack	Mi-25	4	
Sikorsky UH-60	United States	Utility	S-70 / UH-60A	7	
Trainer aircraft
Aero L-39 Albatros	Czech Republic	Jet trainer		1	

== Facilities ==
Base	Description
Bagram Air Base	Bagram was the largest all military air base in Afghanistan. It was a primary center for United States and allied forces for cargo, helicopter, and support flights.
Bamyan Air Base	Basic gravel airstrip.
Farah Air Base	Airport terminal only.
Herat Air Base	Built by the Soviets in the 1960s, it is the primary civil airport for the western portion of the country, but also houses rotary military aircraft.
Jalalabad Air Base	Rotary aircraft.
Kabul Air Base	Built by the Soviets in 1960, serving civilian traffic and military flights, the primary hub for international civilian flights. It serves as the home of the AAF 1st Wing
Kandahar Air Base	Built by the United States of America around 1960, serving civilian traffic and military support for the southern and central portions of the country. It is the home of AAF 2nd Wing. Was a major center Coalition forces.
Khost Air Base	Rotary aircraft.
Kunduz Air Base	Airport terminal only.
Mazar-i-Sharif Air Base	Built by the Bundeswehr in 2005–2006, it is a dual-use airport serving the northern and central portions of the country. A small American contingent has been based there. Home to the 4th Wing.
Shindand Air Base	Built by the Soviets in 1961. Home to the AAF 3rd Wing, is the second largest military air base in the country, located just south of Herat with significant military aircraft shelters and facilities. Its location made it a prime candidate as a training base for the AAF.

== Insignia ==
During its first incarnation, Afghan aircraft carried simple black and white depictions of the Arms of Afghanistan, with the inscription 'God is great' on the underside of the wings. The Afghan flag was possibly used as well. Afghanistan adopted a black, red, and green flag after the 1929 revolt, and when the Air Force was given aircraft again in 1937, it placed this flag on the rudder, and adopted wing and fuselage roundels based on the three colors.

Roundel and fin flash used by the Afghan Air Force from 1924 until 1929.

Roundel used by the Afghan Air Force from 1937 until 1967.

Roundel introduced in 1967; also used as a fin flash. The three letters are the initials of Afghan Nero-e-Hawa (Afghan air force).

Another variant of the roundel introduced in 1967; also used as a fin flash.

Roundel used by the Afghan Air Force from 1978 until 1980.

Roundel used by the Afghan Air Force from 1983 until 1992.

Variants of this emblem adorned many Afghan military aircraft in 2006. The three letters are the initials of Afghan Ordou-e Melli (Afghan National Army).

Roundel used by the Afghan National Air Force from 2007 until 2021.

Emblem of the Afghan Air Force from 2007 until 2021

One of the insignias used by Afghan Air Force since 2021 after the fall of the republic and the return of Taliban to Kabul, which is largely the Emblem of Taliban Afghanistan.

The Royal Afghan Air Force retained the roundels until adopting a new style in 1967, with a unique insignia consisting of a tri-color triangle using the national colors upon a white disc, on which was inscribed with Arabic lettering forming various phrases. This roundel was placed on the rudder in place of the flag. This remained in use after the overthrow of the monarchy until the Saur Revolution in 1978, when a new insignia of a red disc with yellow inscriptions with the Pashto word Khalq was adopted. This was short-lived however, as in 1983, an emblem more reminiscent of the 1937 Afghan Airforce roundel was adopted which featured a red star on a white disc ringed in black, red, and green was adopted. These were in use until the fall of the Najibullah regime in April 1992.

Upon the fall of the Homeland Party government in 1992, various different roundels were adopted by different warlord factions of Hezb-e Islami Gulbuddin, Jamiat-e Islami, the Junbish and later the Taliban some of which included the old tri-color with different coloring depending on the faction.

After the 2021 Taliban reassertion of power in Afghanistan, on some helicopters the triangle insignia was replaced by the flag or the coat of arms of the Islamic Emirate of Afghanistan while on other aircraft and most airplanes, the Taliban continue to use the traditional Afghan Air Force triangle.

== See also ==
- Abdul Ahad Momand - Afghan Cosmonaut and Air Force Colonel
- Latifa Nabizada
- Niloofar Rahmani
- Mohammad Dawran - Afghan Air Force Major General and Soyuz TM-6 candidate
- Abdul Qadir

== Notes ==
- Antonio Giustozzi (2016). The Army of Afghanistan: A Political History of a Fragile Institution. London: C Hurst & Co. ISBN 9781849044813. 288 pp.; £35.00. Due to its 'simplicity, which matched low technology and basic organization found among the human resources available' the Taliban's army from 1996 to 2001 was perhaps the most successful national army for Afghanistan (p. 121).
- Daniel Goure (28 January 2013). "U.S. Acquisition Decisions Undermine Afghan Air Force".
- Forrest L. Marion (Summer 2010). "The Destruction and Rebuilding of the Afghan Air Force, 1989-2009" (PDF). Air Power History. 57 (2): 27. JSTOR 26275885.
- Nikitenko, E.G. (2004). Афганистан: От войны 80-х до прогноза новых войн [Afghanistan: From the war of the 80s to the forecast of new wars] (10,000 copies ed.). Balashikha: Astrel (ru:Астрель). ISBN 5-271-07363-7 – via под ред. Захаровой Л.(Никитенко Е. Г.)
- Nyrop, Richard F., and Donald M. Seekins. "Area Handbook Series: Afghanistan: A Country Study:" Fort Belvoir, VA: Defense Technical Information Center, January 1986.
- Inspector General United States Department of Defense (28 September 2012). Assessment of U.S. Government and Coalition Plans to Train, Equip, and Field the Afghan Air Force (PDF) (Report). DODIG-2012-141.
- International Institute for Strategic Studies (2024). "Chapter Five: Asia". The Military Balance. 124 (1). Taylor & Francis: 218–327. doi:10.1080/04597222.2024.2298593. ISSN 0459-7222.
- Special Inspector General for Afghanistan Reconstruction (January 2022). Afghan Air Forces: DOD Has Taken Steps to Develop Afghan Aviation Capability but Continued U.S. Support is Needed to Sustain Forces (PDF) (Report). SIGAR 21-14 Audit Report.
- Special Inspector General for Afghanistan Reconstruction (30 January 2020). Quarterly report to the United States Congress (PDF) (Report). Arlington, Va.
- Special Inspector General for Afghanistan Reconstruction (30 October 2021). Quarterly report to the United States Congress (PDF) (Report). Arlington, Va.
- United States. Department of Defense (November 2010). Report on Progress Toward Security and Stability in Afghanistan (PDF) (Report). OCLC 769299266.
- United States. Department of Defense (June 2020). Enhancing Security and Stability in Afghanistan (PDF) (Report). E-2BA2571.
- Yousaf, Mohammad & Adkin, Mark (1992). Afghanistan, the bear trap: the defeat of a superpower. Havertown, Penn.: Casemate. p. 159. ISBN 978-0-9711709-2-6. Republished 2001.
