= MBP =

MBP or mbp may refer to:

== Science and technology ==
- Münchausen syndrome by proxy, a disorder wherein a caregiver acts as if their patient has health problems
- MacBook Pro, a line of Macintosh portable computers by Apple Inc.
- Modbus Plus, an extended version of the Modbus serial communications protocol published by Modicon in 1979

=== Biology ===
- Mega base pairs (Mbp)
- Major basic protein, a protein which in humans is encoded by the PRG2 gene
- Maltose-binding protein, a part of the maltose/maltodextrin system of Escherichia coli
- 4-Methyl-2,4-bis(4-hydroxyphenyl)pent-1-ene, a metabolite of bisphenol A
- Milk basic protein, a milk protein fraction
- Myc-binding protein-1, a protein encoded by the alpha-enolase glycolytic enzyme
- Myelin basic protein, a protein believed to be important in the process of myelination of nerves in the central nervous system
- Mannan-binding lectin (also mannose- or mannan-binding protein), an important factor in innate immunity

== Media ==
- "ManBearPig", the sixth episode of the tenth season of Comedy Central's South Park
- Million Book Project, a book digitization project, led by Carnegie Mellon University
- Murder by Pride, the eighth studio album by Stryper

== Organisations ==
- McDonough Bolyard Peck, an American construction management company
- Marquette Branch Prison, a prison in Michigan, US
- Ministry of Public Security (Poland) (Polish: Ministerstwo Bezpieczeństwa Publicznego) 1945-1954
- MBP Moto, an Italian motorcycle brand based in Bologna and owned by the Qianjiang Motorcycle company

== Other uses ==
- Wiwa language (ISO 639 code: mbp), a Chibchan language
- Metzitzah b'peh, a method sometimes used in the brit milah circumcision ritual

== See also ==
- Megabit per second (Mbps or Mbit/s), a data rate unit
- Megabyte per second (MBps or MB/s), a data rate unit
- MBPS (Member British Psychological Society)
