= Delphine Gardey =

French historian and sociologist

Dr. Delphine Gardey
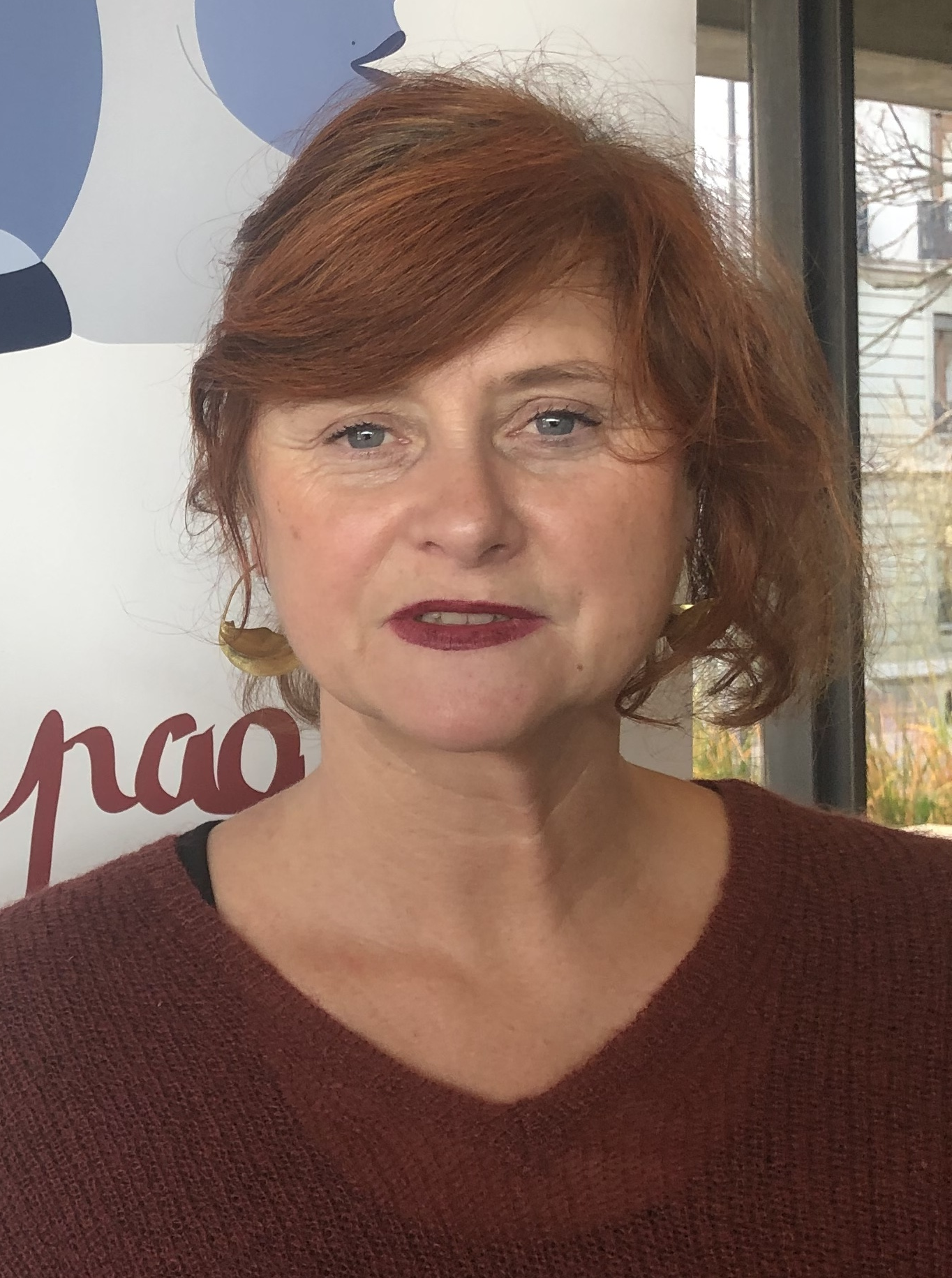
- Born: 19 January 1967 (age 59)
- Occupations: Historian; Sociologist

Academic work
- Discipline: History; Sociology
- Sub-discipline: Gender and science; Women's studies
- Institutions: University of Geneva; University of Versailles Saint-Quentin-en-Yvelines
- Notable works: Politique du clitoris

Delphine Gardey (born 1967, France) is a French historian and sociologist. She is a professor of contemporary history at the University of Geneva, Switzerland, and director of the Institute of Gender Studies at the Faculty of Social Sciences. She is currently a member of the editorial board of the journal Travail, Genre et Sociétés. She is also affiliated with "Groupement De Recherche Européen" (GDRE) (English: European Research Group) and "Marché du travail et genre en Europe" (MAGE) (English: Labor market and gender in Europe). She is a member of the "Genre, Travail, Mobilités" (GTM) (English: Gender, Work, Mobilities) Laboratory of "Centre de recherches sociologiques et politiques de Paris" (CRESPPA) (English: Paris Center for Sociological and Political Research). Her work focuses mainly on the history of science and technology studies, feminist theories, as well as the place of women in history and society in general.

== Career and research ==
Gardey was a researcher at the "Centre de recherche en histoire des sciences et des techniques" (English: Center for Research in the History of Science and Technology) from 1995 to 2006 within a research group funded by the Cité des Sciences et de l'Industrie (CSI) of Paris, the French National Centre for Scientific Research (CNRS), and the School for Advanced Studies in the Social Sciences (EHESS). She was a lecturer at the Paris 8 University Vincennes-Saint-Denis until 2008.

In 2009, she became a professor of sociology at the University of Versailles Saint-Quentin-en-Yvelines. In the same year, Gardey was appointed full professor of contemporary history at the University of Geneva, as well as director of the master's and doctorate in gender studies. From 2010 to 2012, she was appointed Vice-Dean of the Faculty of Economics and Social Sciences at the University of Geneva, then Vice-Dean of the Faculty of Social Sciences from 2014 to 2016. From 2009 to 2017, she held the position of director of the Institute of Gender Studies within this same university; she has also been director of the doctoral school in Romandy in gender studies since 2021.

Gardey's research focuses on the history of women in the workforce, the social history of techniques, the history of writing and information technology, the history of the office and of tertiary sector of the economy. For example, she studied the development of the typing profession from 1890 to 1930, as well as the Taylorization of office work, which, according to her, devalued this type of work and led to a feminization of a sector previously occupied mainly by men.

Gardey is interested in the way in which cognitive and material innovations were at the origin at the end of the 19th century of an "administrative revolution". She studies how technological evolution has redefined social and cultural roles. She works on issues linking gender and science, as well as gender and information and communication technologies. She has made scientific studies carried out at the international level available to French researchers by proposing to combine these studies with questions about gender. In 2004, the CNRS asked her for a report on "the challenges of research on gender and sex". According to Françoise Thébaud, Gardey has developed elements that contribute to the recognition of studies on women and gender.

== Selected works ==
=== Books ===
- La dactylographe et l’expéditionnaire. Histoire des employés de bureau (1890-1930), Paris, Belin, 2001.
- Le Linge Du Palais-Bourbon. Corps, matérialité et genre du politique à l’ère démocratique, Lormont, éditions Le Bord de l’Eau, 2015.
- Écrire, calculer, classer. Comment une révolution de papier a transformé les sociétés contemporaines (1800-1940), Paris, La Découverte, 2008.
- Politique du clitoris, Paris, Textuel, 2019.

=== Edited volumes ===
- With Ilana Löwy (ed.), L’invention du naturel. Les sciences et la fabrication du féminin et du masculin, Paris, éditions des Archives contemporaines, 2000.
- With Chabaud-Rychter Danielle, L’engendrement des choses. Des hommes, des femmes et des techniques, Paris, éditions des Archives contemporaines, 2002.
- Le féminisme change-t-il nos vies?, Paris, Textuel, 2011.
- With Kraus Cynthia (ed.), Politiques de coalition. Penser et se mobiliser avec Judith Butler. Politics of Coalition. Thinking Collective Action with Judith Butler, Zurich, Éd. Seismo, 2016.
- With Vuille Marilène (ed.), Les sciences du désir. La sexualité féminine de la psychanalyse aux neurosciences, Lormont, Le Bord de l’eau, 2018.

=== Reports ===
- "Enjeux des recherches sur le genre et le sexe", report written at the request of the scientific council of CNRS, 2000.
