= Lion Dates =

- Type: Private company
- Industry: India's largest Dates processing and trading Company.
- Founded: 1978; 48 years ago
- Founder: P. Ponnudurai
- Headquarters: Tiruchirappalli, Tamil Nadu
- Area served: India/Middle East
- Key people: P. Ponnudurai (MD); Anitha P (Director)
- Products: Dates, Honey, Jam, Tamarind.
- Number of employees: 600
- Website: www.liondates.com

Lion Dates Impex Private Limited is India's largest date processing and trading company. The company has factories located in the city of Tiruchirapalli and nearby villages in India. The company also markets dates as a product to improve health. The company also manufactures honey, jam and oats. The Lion Dates brand is available across 29 states and 7 union territories in India.

Lion Dates is an ISO 22000:2018 company. The company adheres to principles of corporate social responsibility, and provides employment to rural women and employment to disabled people helping them gain socioeconomic mobility in society.

Today Lion Dates has close to a monopoly for dates in the Indian market.

== Company affairs ==
The Lion Dates company is headed by Sri P. Ponnudurai, who has been conferred the best industrialist award from the Chief Minister of the State of Tamil Nadu on 15 August 2011. He was also presented this award for being the best private employer by providing maximum number of employment opportunities to disabled people.

== Products ==
The products offered by Lion Dates are:

- Lion Dates – deseeded.
- Lion Desert King dates.
- Lion Dates syrup.
- Lion Kashmir honey.
- Lion Oats.
- Lion Tamarind.
- Lion Jam – Mixed fruit, Dates and Pineapple.
- Lion rose sharbat
