= Gender roles in agriculture =

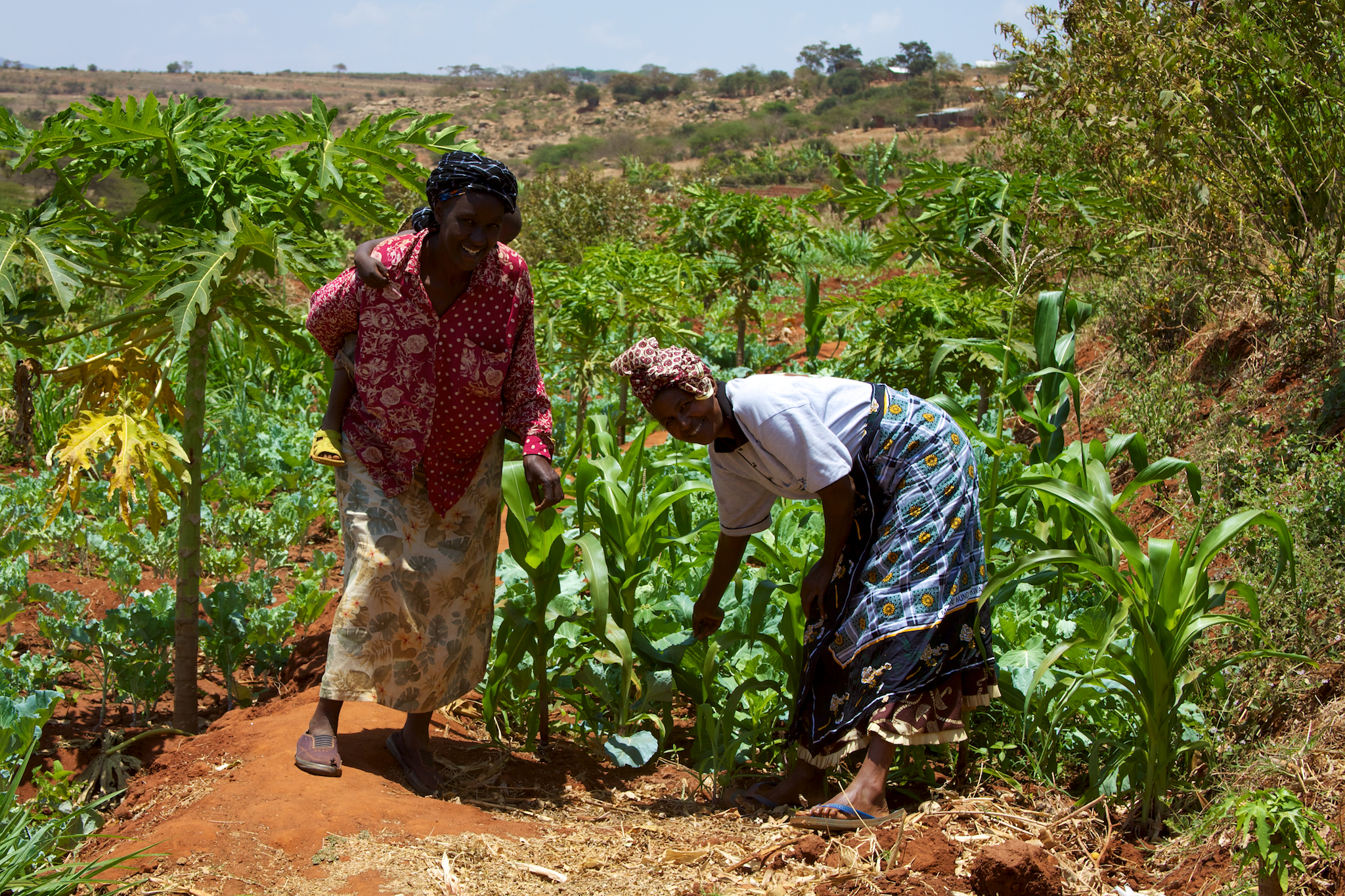
Historically, women have faced a number of challenges when participating in agriculture, with patriarchal societies frequently limiting how much agency and control women in agricultural communities have over their own labor. However, with the Feminization of agriculture, the process where men leave rural areas for urban jobs, leaving behind more women tending the land, more women operate as smallholders (like these women in Kenya), playing a vital role in food security and rural economies.

Gender roles in agriculture are a frequent subject of study by sociologists and farm economists. Historians also study them, as they are important in understanding the social structure of agrarian, and even industrial, societies. Agriculture provides many job opportunities and livelihoods around the world. It can also reflect gender inequality and uneven distribution of resources and privileges among gender.

In particular, pastoralist, ethnic minority, indigenous and rural women continue to face numerous obstacles when trying to access and control natural resources, technological devices and agricultural services; also, they are not involved in processes of decision-making. Most of the time, such obstacles have their roots in practices of discrimination, which highly influence women's independence.

According to the Institute of Agriculture and Natural Resources, University of Nebraska-Lincoln, women usually have a harder time obtaining land, tools and knowledge than men, especially in developing countries. Several organizations such as Food and Agriculture Organization and independent research have indicated that increasing gender corporation can bring more profits and food security for the community.

In general, women account for a greater share of agricultural employment at lower levels of economic development, as inadequate education, limited access to basic infrastructure and markets, high-unpaid work burden and poor rural employment opportunities outside agriculture severely limit women’s opportunities for off-farm work.

Women make up well over 50 percent of the agricultural labour force in many sub-Saharan African countries. About half of the labour force in agriculture is female in several countries in Southeast Asia, including Cambodia, the Lao People’s Democratic Republic and Viet Nam.

Women who work in agricultural production tend to do so under highly unfavourable conditions. They tend to be concentrated in the poorest countries, where alternative livelihoods are not available, and they maintain the intensity of their work in conditions of climate-induced weather shocks and in situations of conflict.

Women are less likely to participate as entrepreneurs and independent farmers and are engaged in the production of less lucrative crops. Often, women are unpaid family workers or casual workers in agriculture. Social norms may also constrain women from producing crops and participating in activities dominated by men.

The gender gap in land productivity between female- and male managed farms of the same size is 24 percent. On average, women earn 18.4 percent less than men in wage employment in agriculture; this means that women receive 82 cents for every dollar earned by men.

== Global trends ==
While on average women represented 37.8% of all agricultural workers in 2021, this share is above 50 percent in 22 countries, most of them in Africa. Women and men working in agriculture might have different employment status. Generally, the women employed in agriculture are more likely to be engaged as contributing family workers whereas men are more likely to be engaged on their own account as workers generating an income.In addition, women often spend more time than men on activities such as food processing and food preparation for the household, child and elder care, water and fuel collection and other unpaid household duties.

== North America ==
=== United States ===
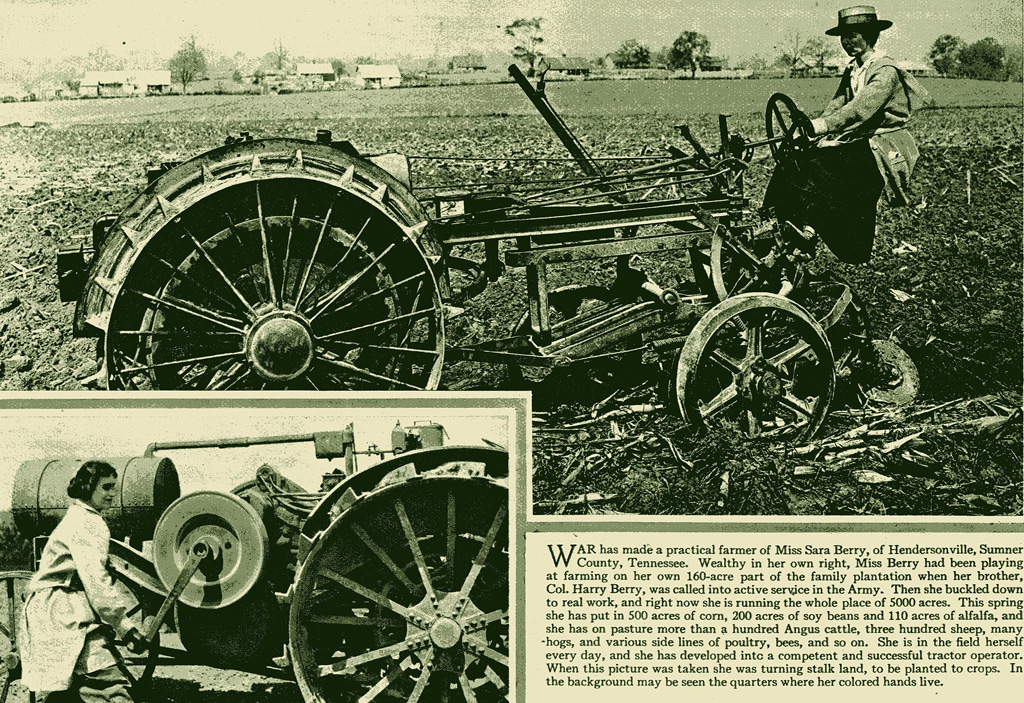
Sara Berry successfully managing her family's 5,000 acre plantation.

The "classical" farm gender roles in the United States, although varying somewhat from region to region, were generally based on a division of labor in which men participated in "field" tasks (animal care, plowing, harvesting crops, using farm machinery, etc.), while most women participated primarily in "farmhouse" tasks (preparing and preserving food and feed-stuffs, and maintaining the farm compound).

According to agro-historian Jane Adams, the middle 20th century brought a change in which the centralization of agriculture eliminated many of the tasks considered part of the "female" role. This changed the perception of women from being active "housekeepers" to passive "homemakers". Some began working off the farm, or joined their husbands in fieldwork, but the majority, per Dr. Adams, simply became more like urban housewives. This trend continued until the 1980s farm crisis, in which economic downturns obliged many of them to take jobs off-farm.

=== Canada ===
Gender roles in Canadian agriculture vary greatly according to the region and community.

Alberta, and particularly Southern Alberta, has traditionally had highly defined gender roles similar to the late 19th-century United States. Men worked together and women worked together, but there were few tasks in which both men and women participated together. On most Alberta farms up until the 1970s, decisions about matters such as planning and insurance were done by fiat of the husband, rather than by joint venture of husband and wife. Some writers have considered Alberta's highly gendered division of farm life to be not only inefficient from an agricultural standpoint, but deleterious to the integrity of marriage relationships as well.

In the agricultural tradition of Central Canada there is an emphasis on conjugal (husband-and-wife) collaboration. Major decisions are normally made together, with each spouse having equal decisive power. When extended families live and farm together, couples within the extended family are considered as working "units". This style of family farm management is rather common in the rest of Canada as well.

Quebec agriculture is based on the historic seigneurial system, vestiges of which exist today in the organized district system. Gender roles are sometimes more pronounced in areas where the Catholic influence is strong.

In Southern Ontario the history of agricultural gender roles parallels that of the U.S.A. almost precisely.

Besides these regional generalities, traditions vary among different ethnic and religious communities, such as First Nations (aboriginal), Anabaptist, or historic immigrant settlements.

Across Canada, and also in the United States, the assignment of roles tends to be more egalitarian on organic and Certified Naturally Grown farms than on "conventional" ones.

== Europe ==
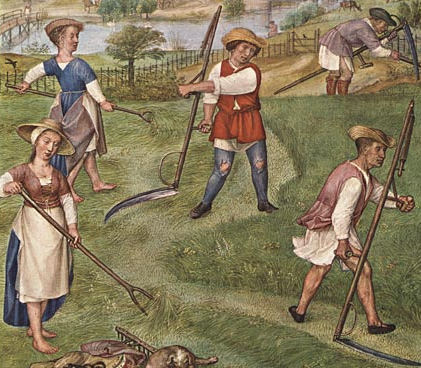
Women working in the field, from the Grimani Breviary, c. 1510

=== Commonwealth of Independent States (former Soviet Union) ===
Agricultural society in what is now the Commonwealth of Independent States goes back thousands of years, and entails numerous distinct cultures. Slavic-speaking societies tended to follow the general Indo-European pattern of patrilineality, passing down property and rights from father to son. In agriculture this meant land and livestock. The gender roles on the farm presumed that the farm and all its contents belonged to the father or grandfather. Uralic-speaking societies, on the other hand, had a relatively egalitarian system in which land was considered to be the domain of a larger extended family or folk group, without rigid boundaries between individual homesteads. Division of labor was not rigid, and spouses often worked alongside each other, or helped each other with various tasks.

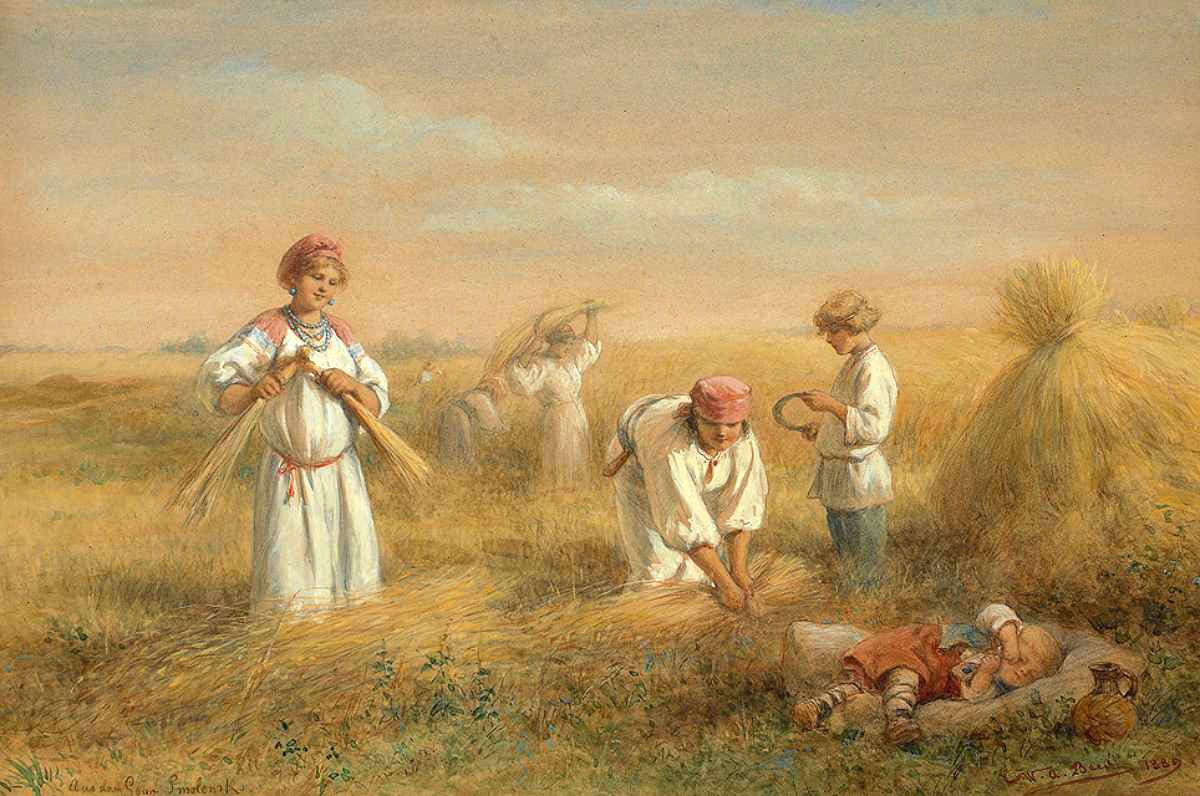
Harvest in Smolensk Governorate in the 19th century

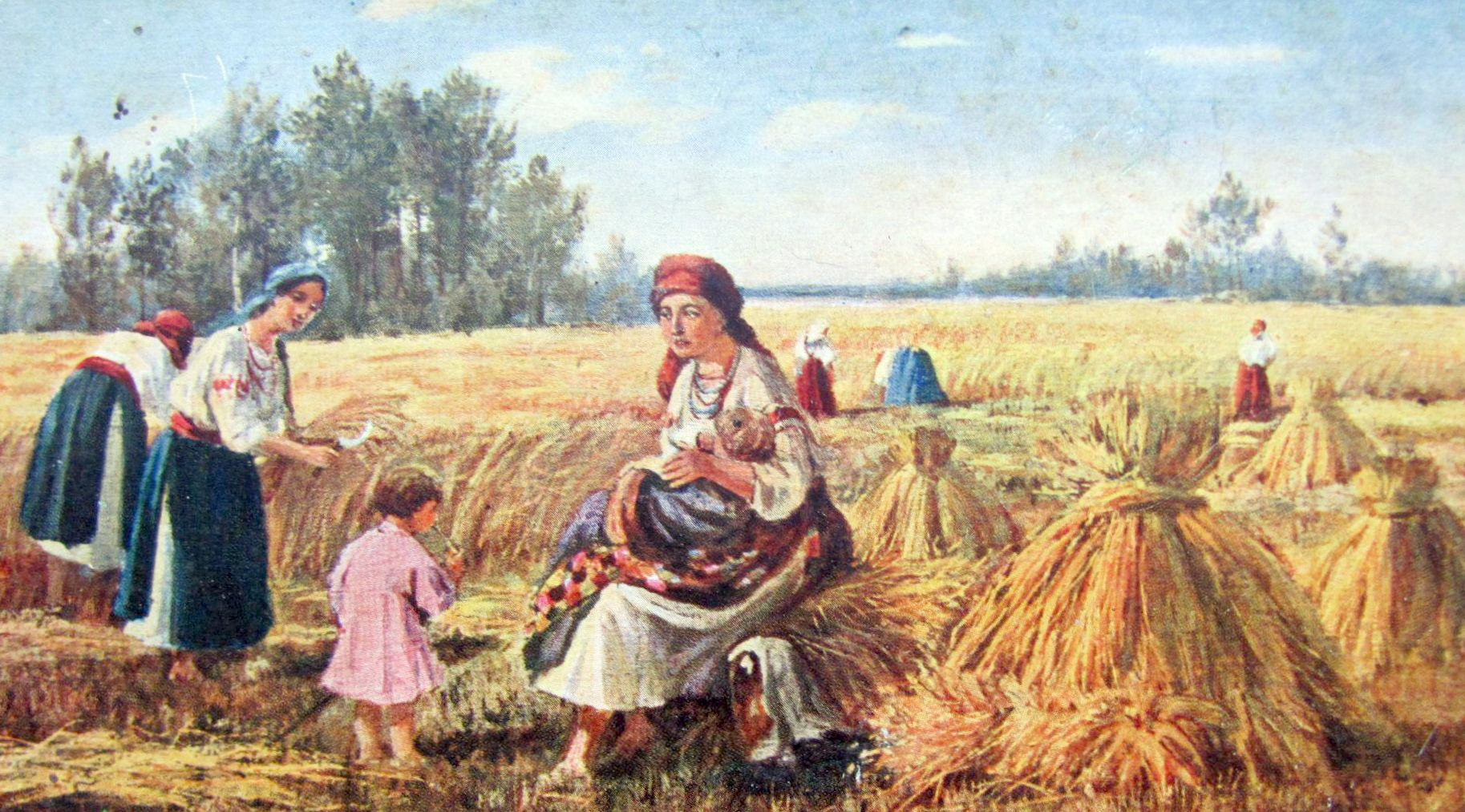
Russian peasant women during the harvest in the early 20th century

During the Russian Empire period, Slavonic patriarchy was emphasized and promoted to a greater extent across the board. This was especially the case in southern and central Russia during the 18th and 19th centuries, where every farmer or farm laborer was considered to hold a position in the feudal hierarchy of the Empire, until this system was modified in the later 19th century. Men were the official landowners and decision-makers, though women often had a significant amount of unofficial influence in decision-making (on the free peasant farmsteads).

In the years leading up to the Revolution, as the remnants of feudalism disintegrated, many Russian farm families joined artels (артели), or cooperatives. The cooperatives practiced (at least in theory) equal consideration of men's and women's opinions in making collective decisions, which was a sharp contrast to the feudal method. Moreover, as the Empire became more connected by rail and road, the rural residents of central and southern Russia gained knowledge of Uralic-based farm operation systems (which had survived in the north and east). These northern and eastern traditions contributed to the emerging cooperative practices.

After the Revolution, the government was initially supportive toward the artel movement (since it is "collectivist"). When the Stalinist government took power, however, many of the artels were superseded by state farm units (sovkhozy or Совхоэӣ) under control of the central government. The effect on gender roles varied: workers of both sexes were assigned to do similar tasks, but managers and overseers were mostly male, though there was no fixed rule or custom that established this as absolute. Fieldworkers often worked in mixed-gender teams, though in the Caucasian and Middle Asian republics an informal segregation by sex was maintained, following local (and ultimately Islamic) traditions. Throughout the Union, state-farm administrators tended to have little regard for marital relationships: marriage was considered part of the workers' personal lives, which needed not enter into the world of economic labor. Children born or conceived on a state farm were considered "bound" to it, in a concept lent from feudalism.

Later governments, from Krushchev's onward, eased the central control of farms, though certain republics (such as Tajikistan) took up this control into their own state governments, and retain much of it even to this day.

With the 1960s loosening of central administration over agriculture, the cooperative system became once again the main system of large-scale farmland operations in much of the U.S.S.R. This condition has remained ever since, with only minor changes.

Where small and extended family farms exist in the Commonwealth of Independent States, consensus is often a major mode of decision-making, and cooperation a major mode of work. On collective farms as well, conjugal collaboration is a respected and encouraged part of the overall dynamic, and couples often work as units within the larger framework. Exceptions include the Chechenya/Dagestan/Naxcivan region, where all areas of life are highly sex-segregated, and marriage is often an arranged contract by the parents.

=== Finland ===
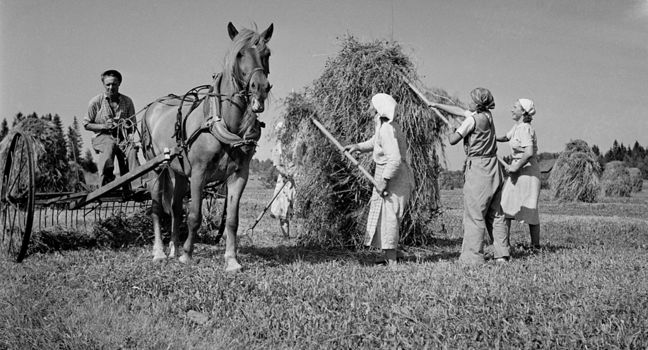
Haymaking in Finland, 1942

Finnish agriculture tends to follow a modern form of what is recognizably the Uralic system, though the influence of western Europe (particularly in Finland's west half) has brought a greater consciousness of private property. Conjugal collaboration and joint venture are major characteristics of the Finnish farming tradition.

=== Ireland ===
Two thirds of farmland in Ireland is family owned and run for typically over a century. Out of that twelve percent of which are owned by women. Typically men hold more of the productive roles involving the operation and maintenance of the farm while the women hold reproductive roles and tend to the household. Historically this has given most of the power to the male. In Katie Barclay's "Place and Power in Irish Farms at the End of the Nineteenth Century" most of the leverage for decision making would be the use of the houses spaces such as the kitchen as a tool to negotiate for power within the farm. However, in recent years, women are viewed as a legal business holder giving them increasing recognition on the farm enabling them to have input on crucial decisions.

In the article by Roisin Kelly and Sally Shortall (December 2002), it discusses how due to decreasing income from farming in northern Ireland the women typically get a job outside of the farm to support the farm. This financial move is oftentimes in order to preserve the farm during rough financial times.

== Latin America ==
=== Mexico ===
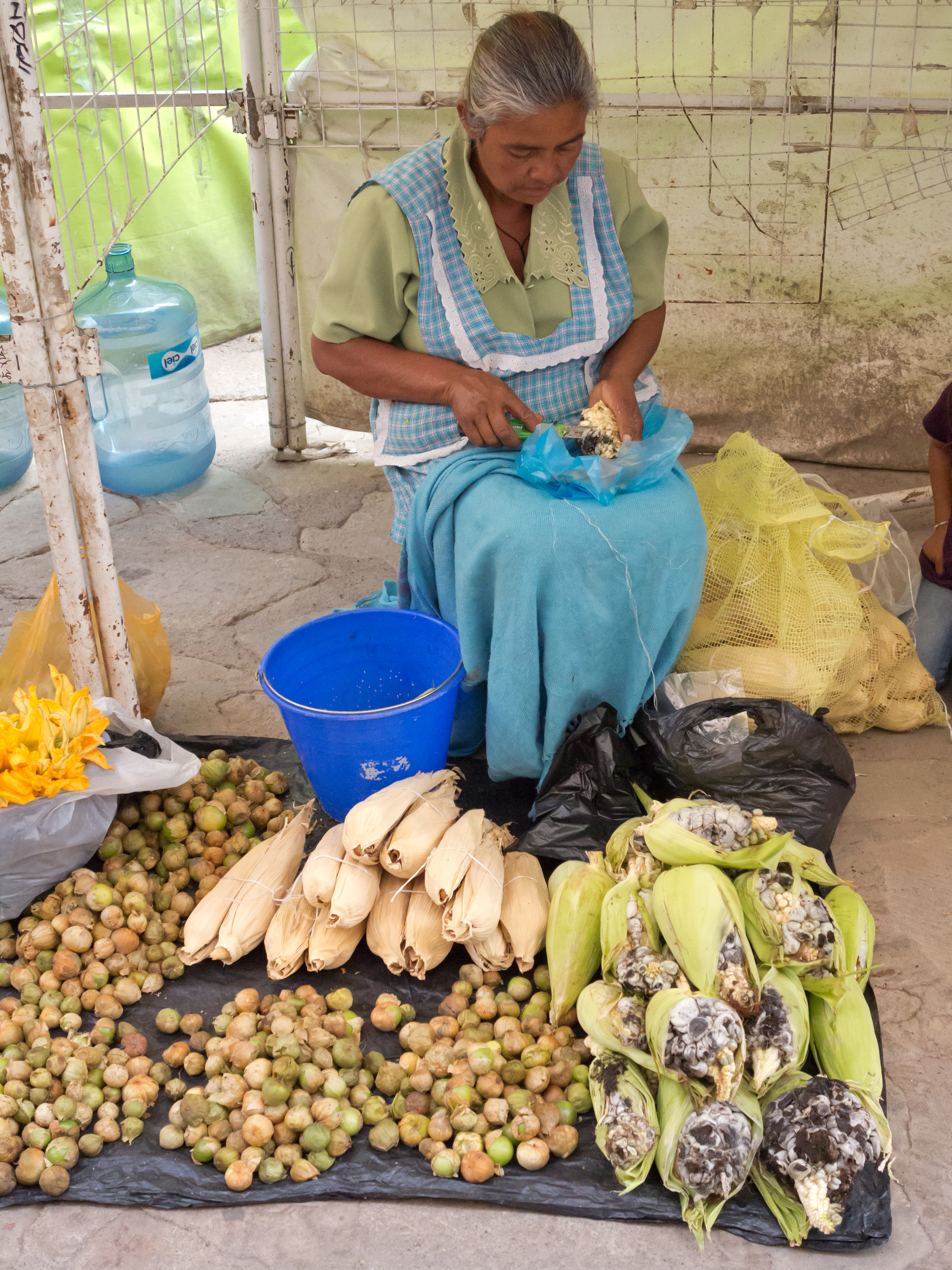
A rural woman selling corn, tomatillos and corn smut in a market in Guanajuato. In many parts of rural Mexico, women play traditional roles in processing and marketing corn and other agricultural products.

In Mexico, the most important crop has been and still is maize. It is the main ingredient in tortillas, which is a staple in Mexican cuisine. Additionally, for many Mexicans, especially those living in rural farming communities, maize symbolizes the origin of life. Women, therefore, are usually the ones responsible for tending the maize crops, although it is not unusual for a man to farm the maize.

Although women have traditionally been responsible for the entire tortilla process, from farming the maize to grinding the maize into flour and cooking the tortillas, this takes a substantial amount of time. Because of this, recently some women have been purchasing bags of tortilla flour or even pre-made tortillas in local markets to better fit their busy lifestyle. This has been controversial among individuals living in rural communities, as many people see the tortilla making process as having high importance in the traditions of their culture.

Another recent controversy in Mexico has to do with the type of maize being grown and consumed. Maíz criollo, or landrace maize, is the most common type of maize grown in Mexico, although recently genetically modified crops are becoming more widespread. In a focus group meeting conducted among Mexican farmers, the men tended to feel that the genetically modified maize was better, as it was easier to farm, while the women tended to say that the landrace maize was better because it was more nutritional and better tasting than the genetically modified maize.

=== Brazil ===
In Brazil, large plantations and fincas are often worked by several families. Fieldwork is a large portion of the workers' time, in the case both of men and of women.

In areas of more scattered agriculture, running water is often unavailable. It is usually women who must carry large water containers home from the stream or well in these cases, even though it is men who usually lift most other heavy loads on the Brazilian ranch, such as harvest sacks.

Among inland indigenous peoples, varying forms of the pan-Amazonian (or pan-Amazon-basin) gender role construct are seen. In these societies, especially those in which polygynous marriage has been practiced, the family unit is considered on two levels, the matrifocal and the patrifocal. Crop plots are owned by the brothers of any patrifocal family collectively; thus, if a man plants a field of any crop, all of his brothers and paternal half-brothers are considered to automatically own an equal share of the harvest.

== Africa ==
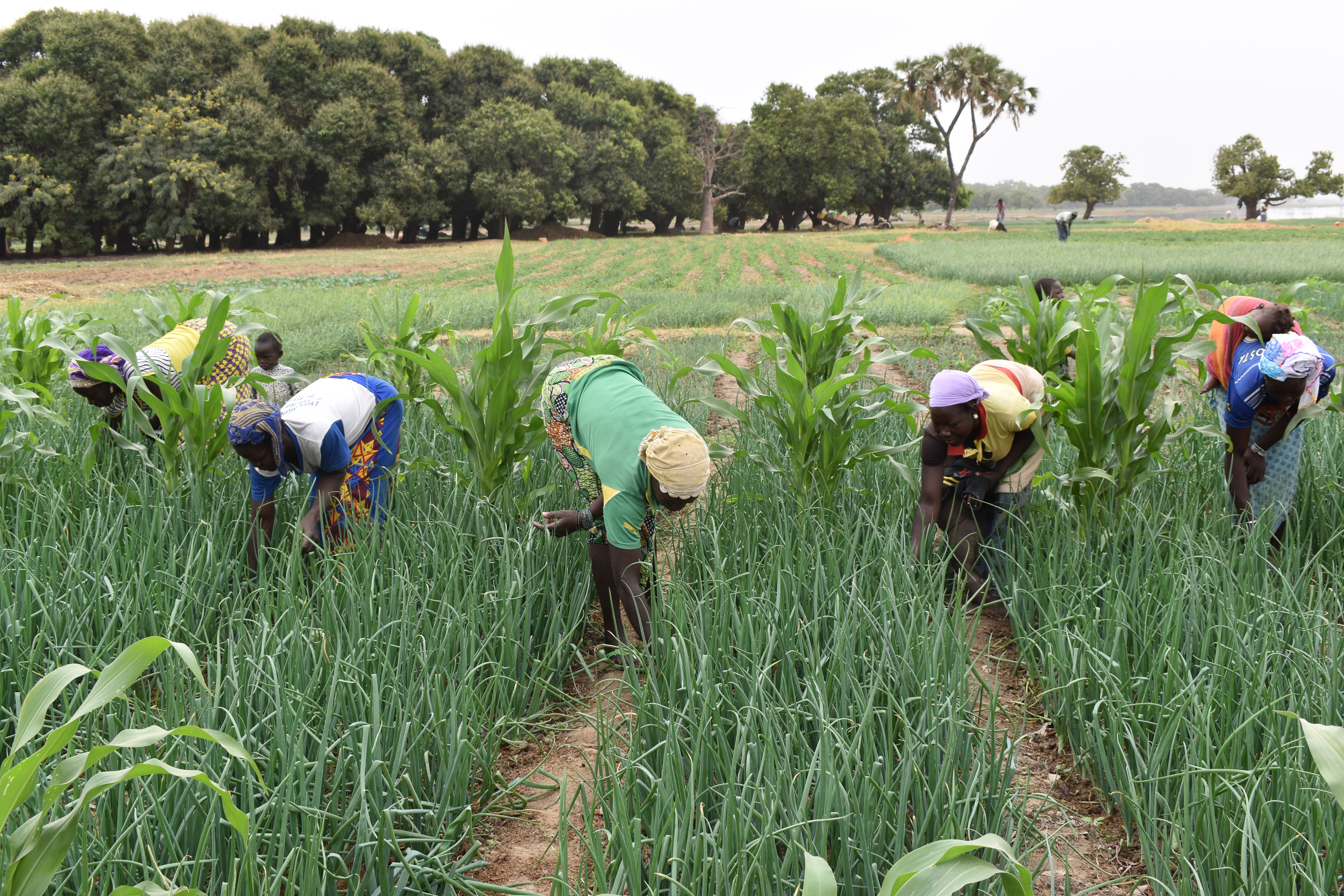
Women working in a field in Burkina Faso

Women in the agriculture sector take on a plethora of roles. They are engaged in production, processing, distribution and trade, often simultaneously, and at times can be involved in multiple aspects of agricultural value chains, especially women who are micro, small or medium-sized enterprises (MSMEs) owners engaged in agriculture (agripreneurs).

Participation in agricultural productive activities reveals gender gaps in several areas such as land, livestock ownership, access to extension services, inputs, production related technology, and social protection. Smallscale farmers in the Africa region, both men and women, lack access to information and knowledge to improve their production capacity, with women regarded as worse off. In addition, gender relations that devalue women's role in agriculture, often regarded as helpers and not farmers, further promote the perception that men hold the authority and decision-making power.

In a lot of African countries nowadays, women rights are secondary in the sense that males dominant in assets, ownership, and education. Women are usually in charge of light farming or crop processing, while males have more opportunities to work with livestock and stay out of their household duty. But it also vary with ethnic groups, age and production cycles. Women are also responsible for children care, their financial ability and educational level may post strong influences on children's well-being. Research showed that equine assisted rural women to finish their chores earlier, which provides females more time for children care. Moreover, by empowering women with assets and knowledge, the children's nutritional status may be improved.

If women farmers were given the same access to resources such as finance, they could increase agricultural yields and contribute to higher national agricultural production levels and strengthen food security.

In sub-Saharan Africa and the southern part of the continent, women conduct the bulk of the agricultural work. An essential step toward increasing agricultural output would be encouraging and supporting women to assume leadership positions in the farming sector. When women work together, they can lessen the effects of poverty and food insecurity on families, raising everyone's standard of living. There is a direct correlation between the aims of sustainable development and the promotion of gender equality and women's empowerment.

=== Ghana ===
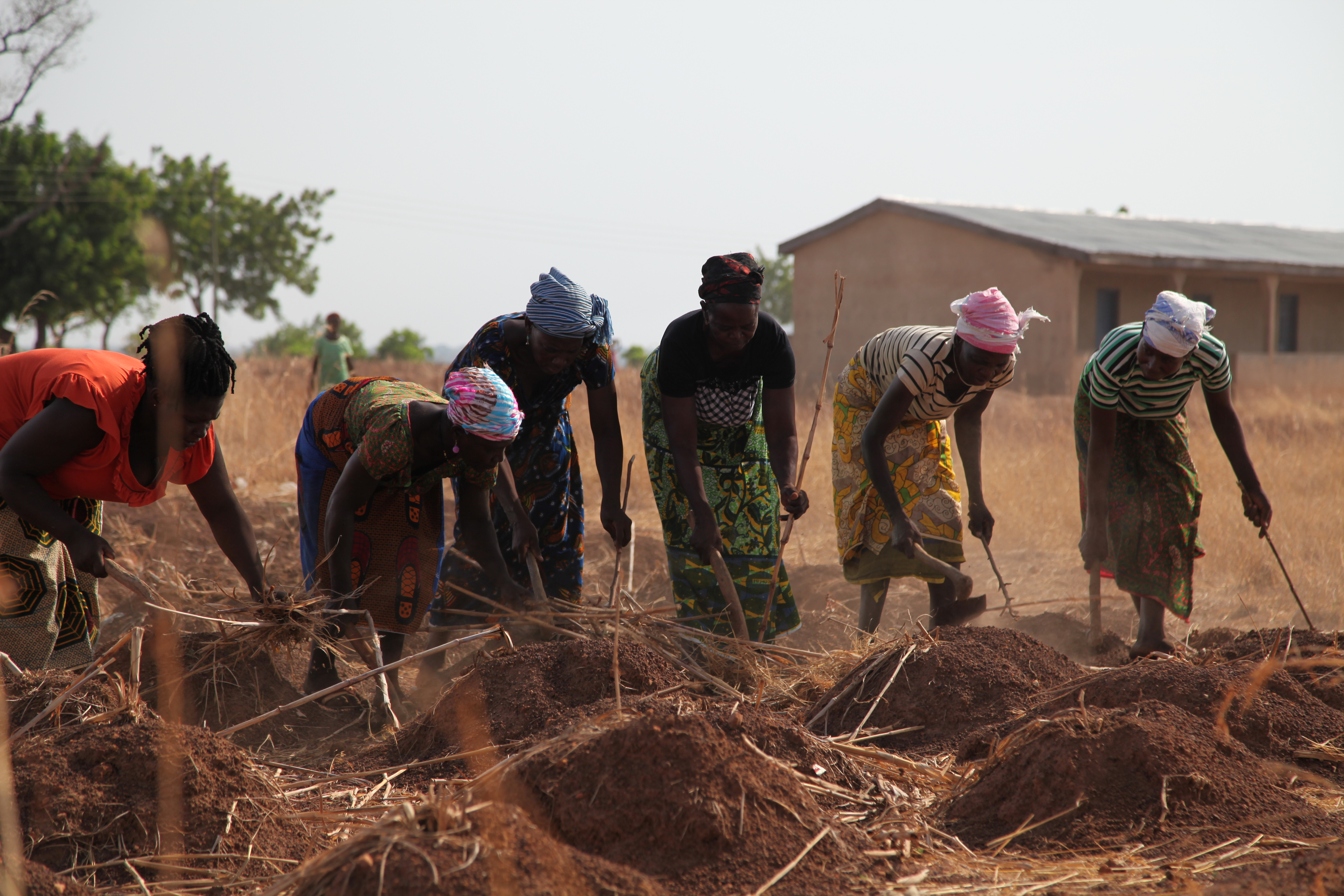
Women in Ghana preparing a field for sowing

60% farmers that conduct agricultural activities in Ghana are male, most agriculture activities that females engaged in are raising small livestock. More females are willing to work near home, such as doing business. Husbands will provide financial support to wives to buy food. The food cultivated constitutes the man's contribution to the family, the wife needs to make up for other deficiencies through her own efforts, so they are under pressure to get other income for their families. A woman who does not farm can't sell her husband's product, while the husband could sell agricultural products behind his wife's back. It is only when income contributes to household consumption that individual household incomes are added up. This is because families usually depend on one member for farming and the other for selling. To avoid disagreement in income, husbands and wives often work in different income streams. For example, women tend to grow perennial plants (such as pepper) that do not require a strong labor force, while men grow cash crops (such as watermelon, okra, and tomatoes). Compared to growing different kinds of crops, a clearer division of labor between the gender is women will do more marketing. Females sell their products directly to consumers or wholesalers.

=== Senegal ===
Although female family members, such as wives, daughters and nieces, were also involved in agriculture, three quarters of the time men were in charge. There are few women in the poultry and ornamental sectors. One example is the Fedri group in Dakar, 10 km away. Through this group, women are actively investing in urban agriculture. Nine women produce vegetables for sale in the domestic market (okra or tomatoes) or export (green beans) and feed small ruminants such as sheep and beef cattle. They even take care of woodlands and orchards. A non-governmental organization is currently funding the panel. Commercial women farmers and producers play different roles in the marketing and processing of agricultural products. Engaging in sales requires very little input and can be a good entry point into the field of agricultural production. Men are generally engaged in high-input, contract production and sales work. More than 90 percent of the retailers in Dakar's free market are women, and almost all of the retail and wholesale shopkeepers who sell a variety of foods, including onions, are men. Most women work as wholesalers as well as retailers of green leafy vegetables and tomatoes.

=== Tanzania ===
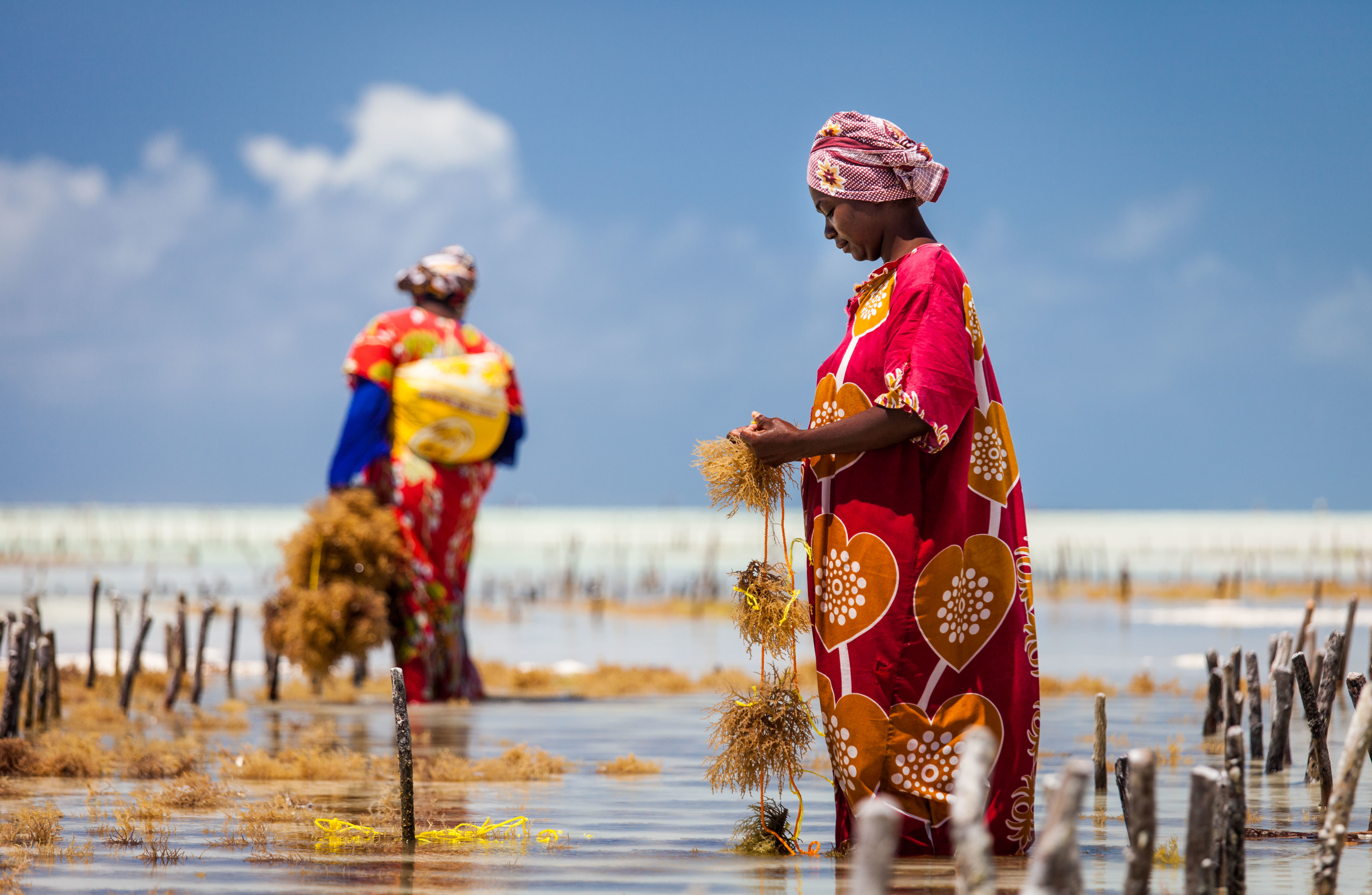
Two women conducting seaweed farming in Jambiani, Tanzania

Traditionally, men and women share the responsibility of raising a family, but usually women have more responsibilities and obligations than men. Both men and women were involved in farming, but they did different things in different places, therefore, it is closely related to the type of agricultural production system. Female farmers are more numerous and engaged in small-scale production, males are the leaders in terms of production because they tend to be responsible for more land. "Female farming" is good for families because it allows the products to be used for consumption and the extra income to be used for other necessities. Men also contribute a portion of their income, but a relatively small share. In general, equality between men and women is more pronounced on farms outside the city, much like in rural families.

=== Zimbabwe ===
Local women have made great contributions to the development of urban agriculture. They not only invest in labor but also participate in management. On non-fixed land, women's farming accounts for 55% to 63%. Among them, 80% of people are engaged in farming activities on their “own land”. In high-income areas, many women hire other laborers. Of the men working in the fields, 24% are employed laborers, and 59% are helping their wives work. Women dominate the production and sales of urban agriculture. 68.8% of the sales of products are women. Children work for their mothers at almost every stage of production and sales. Like rural women, urban women are responsible for food issues. Compared with men, women spend more time and burden on urban agriculture. Especially when the economy is in recession, it is becoming increasingly difficult to maintain family livelihoods. As people become more optimistic about urban agriculture, it is not ruled out that men can replace women's dominant position in agricultural production.

== Asia ==
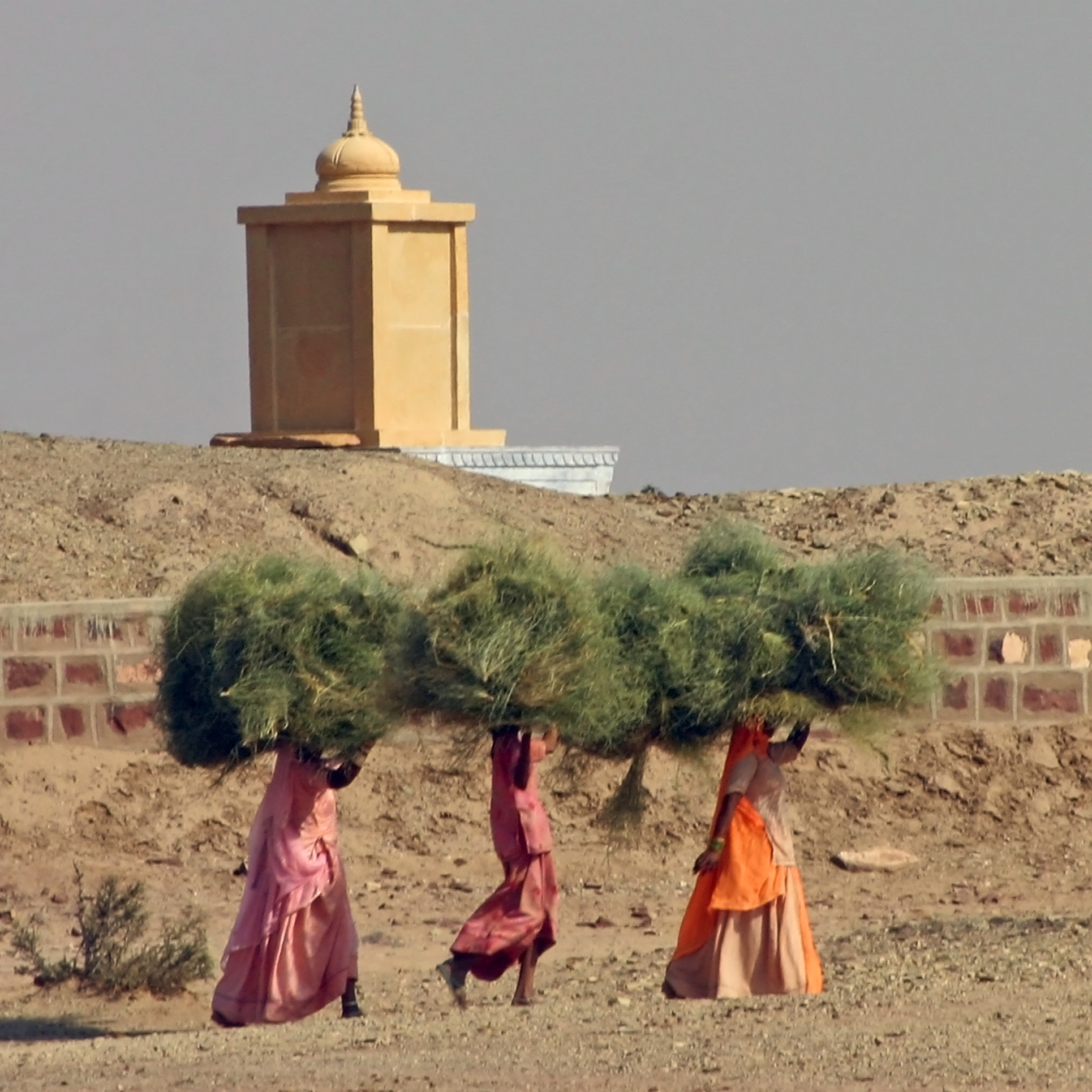
Women carrying grass for fodder on their heads in the Thar Desert in Rajasthan, India

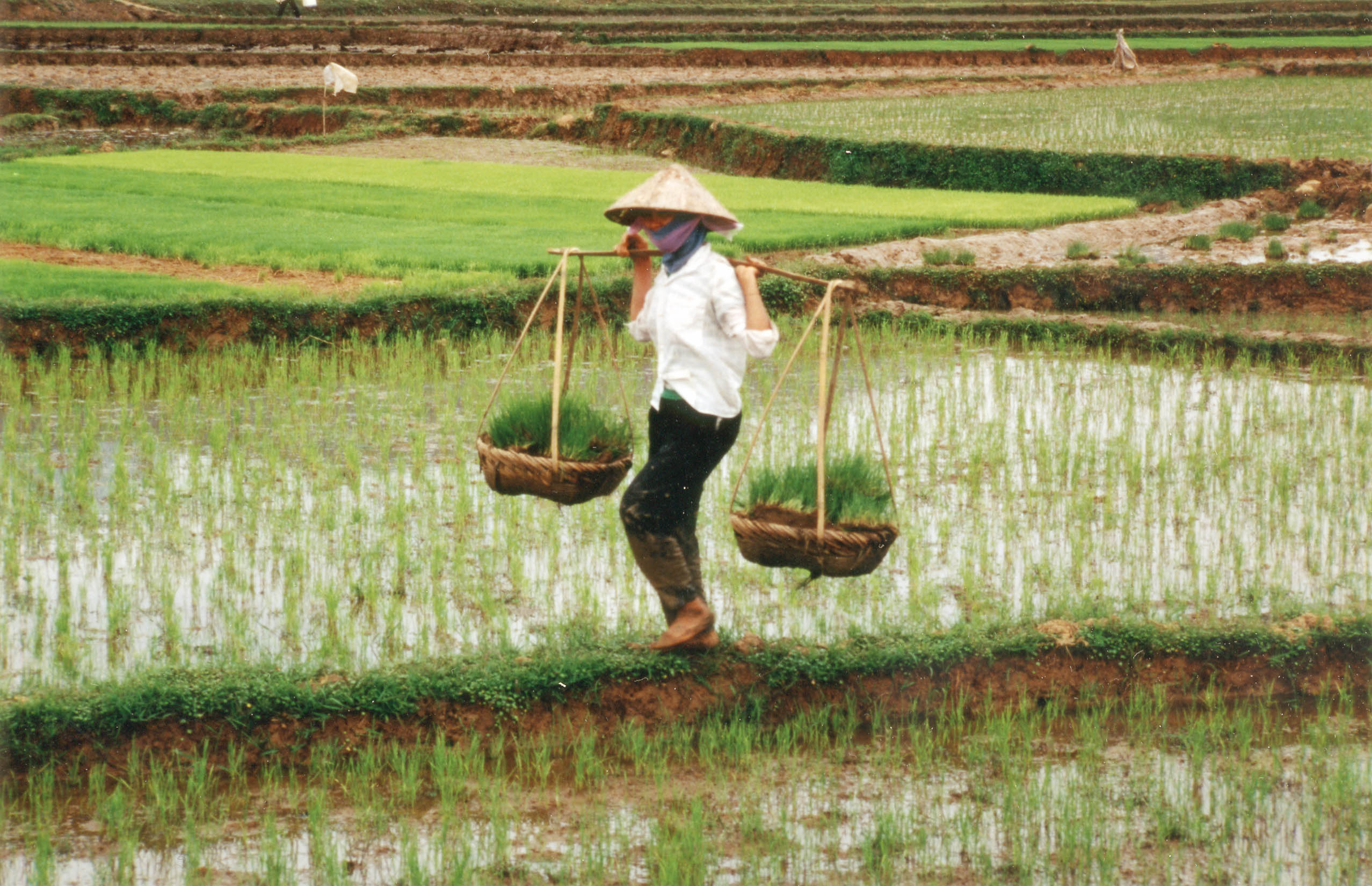
Farmer in Vietnam

== By Region ==
=== Near East and North Africa ===
The 2020 edition of FAO's Near East and North Africa − Regional Overview of Food Security and Nutrition, finds that nearly 55 million people in the Arab States – about 13.2 percent of the total population – are food insecure and the situation is particularly worrying in countries affected by conflicts and protracted crises. Due to the COVID-19 pandemic these numbers are expected to grow.

Gender inequalities in agriculture remain widespread in the region. Rural women and girls continue to face severe discriminations in access to, and ownership of assets, resources and agricultural support services, included those related to community nutrition services. Compared to men, women tend to own lower value assets and have less access to capital, labour, agriculture inputs and tools. In addition, most women's work in farms in the region is unpaid, rendering it essentially invisible. Women also tend to have less entitlements and access to natural resources, such as land and water. For example, despite the significant role they play in managing it, women frequently face obstacles in accessing irrigation water for the cultivation of crops and for raising livestock. This is mainly due to insecurity of land tenure and to their marginal involvement in water governance institutions and user associations, where they are often under-represented and excluded from decision-making processes. Women also have less access to finance due to absence of collaterals for loans. Moreover, in many instances, women do not control the farm, livestock income due to cultural and or lack of access to banking services.

The same applies to other rural organizations and institutions within the rural and agricultural sectors, and this under-representation largely explains why women's interests are often overlooked and agricultural support services rarely attuned to respond to their needs. This, in turn explains, why women tend to have less access to information, technology and trainings, and a lower uptake of nutrition-sensitive agricultural practices.

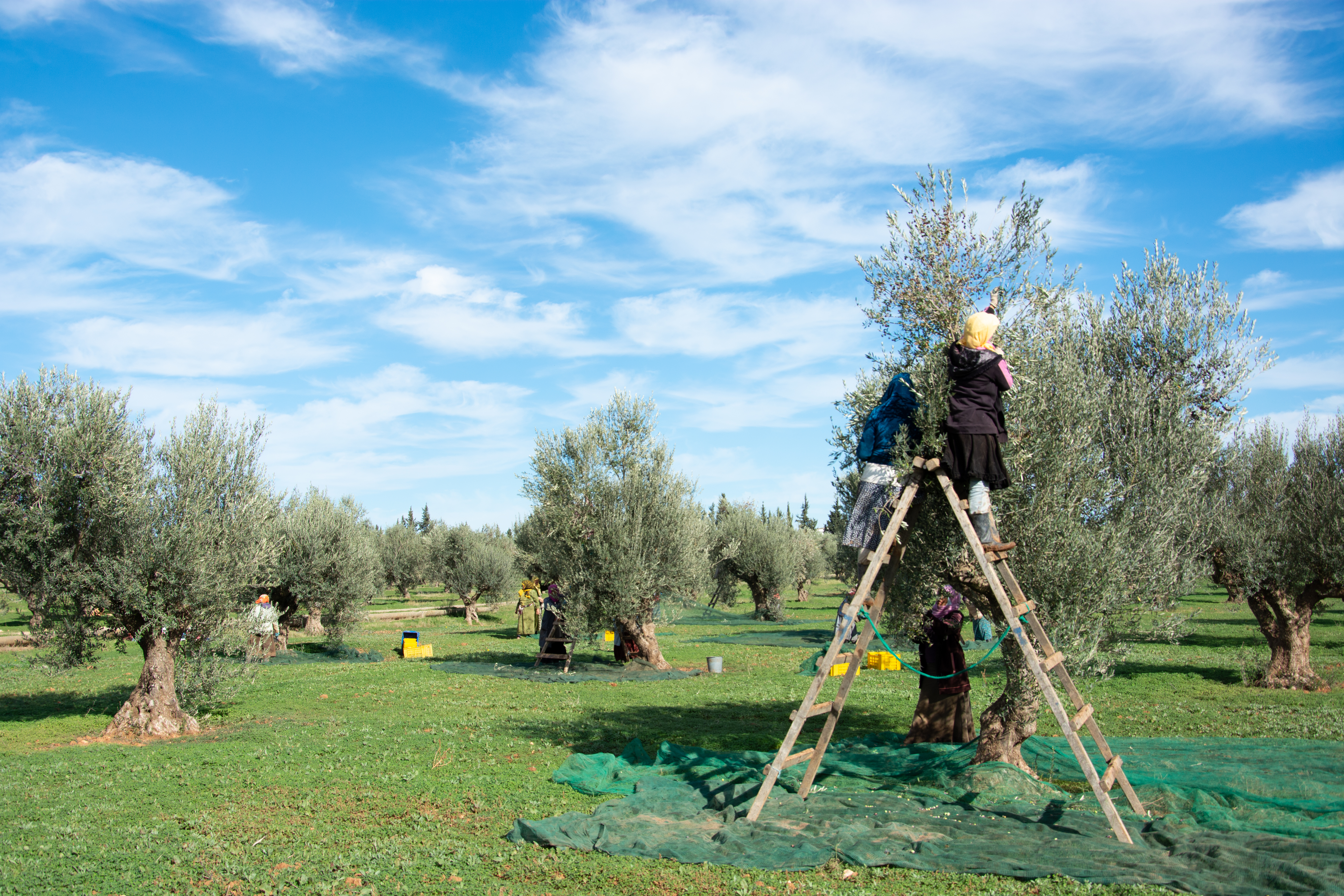
Olive harvest in Tunisia

Increasing women's productivity and reducing women's work burden is not sufficient to improve food security and nutrition. According to the Food and Agricultural Organization of the United Nations (FAO), additional actions are required to ensure that women have decision-making power and ownership over productive assets and the use of income from agriculture and off-farm employment. Promoting women's participation in decision-making processes at all levels is therefore a particularly important aspect of empowerment as it leads to wider social and economic changes. In order to do so and to achieve sustainable and transformative changes, FAO suggests addressing the prevailing and discriminatory gender norms that are hindering women and girls to reach their full potential, and thus impacting food security and nutritional outcomes for women, girls, boys and men.

== Sources ==
This article incorporates text from a free content work. Licensed under CC BY-SA 3.0 (license statement/permission). Text taken from NENA Regional Network on Nutrition-sensitive Food System: Empowering women and ensuring gender equality in agri-food systems to achieve better nutrition - Technical brief, FAO, FAO.

This article incorporates text from a free content work. Licensed under CC BY-SA 3.0 (license statement/permission). Text taken from Seizing the opportunities of the African Continental Free Trade Area for the economic empowerment of women in agriculture, FAO, FAO.

This article incorporates text from a free content work. Licensed under CC BY-SA 3.0 (license statement/permission). Text taken from The status of women in agrifood systems – Overview, FAO, FAO.

This article incorporates text from a free content work. Licensed under CC BY-SA IGO 3.0 (license statement/permission). Text taken from World Food and Agriculture – Statistical Yearbook 2023, FAO, FAO.
