= Bartholomew Colles Watkins =

Irish landscape painter (1833–1891)

Bartholomew Colles Watkins R.H.A.
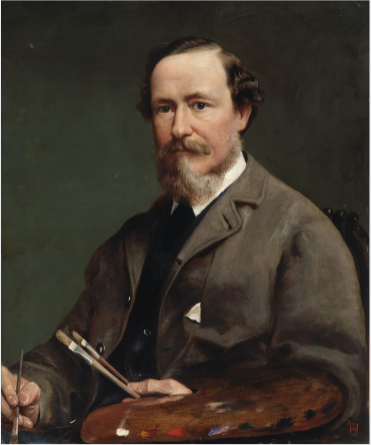
- portrait by Thomas Alfred Jones
- Born: 10 June 1833; Dublin
- Died: 20 November 1891 (aged 58); Upper Lauragh, Ireland
- Resting place: Mount Jerome Cemetery, Dublin
- Education: Royal Dublin Society drawing schools
- Known for: Landscape painting

Bartholomew Colles Watkins (6 June 1833 – 20 November 1891) was a prominent Irish landscape painter during the Victorian era.

== Biography ==
Colles Watkins was born on June 6th, 1833 on 19 Essex Street in Dublin. He studied at the Royal Dublin Society drawing schools.

Colles Watkins became a prominent landscape painter often depicting the mountainous landscapes of Connemara and Kerry. He was elected associate member of the Royal Hibernian Academy in 1861 and full member in 1864. His work is represented in the collections of the National Gallery of Ireland and the Ulster Museum.

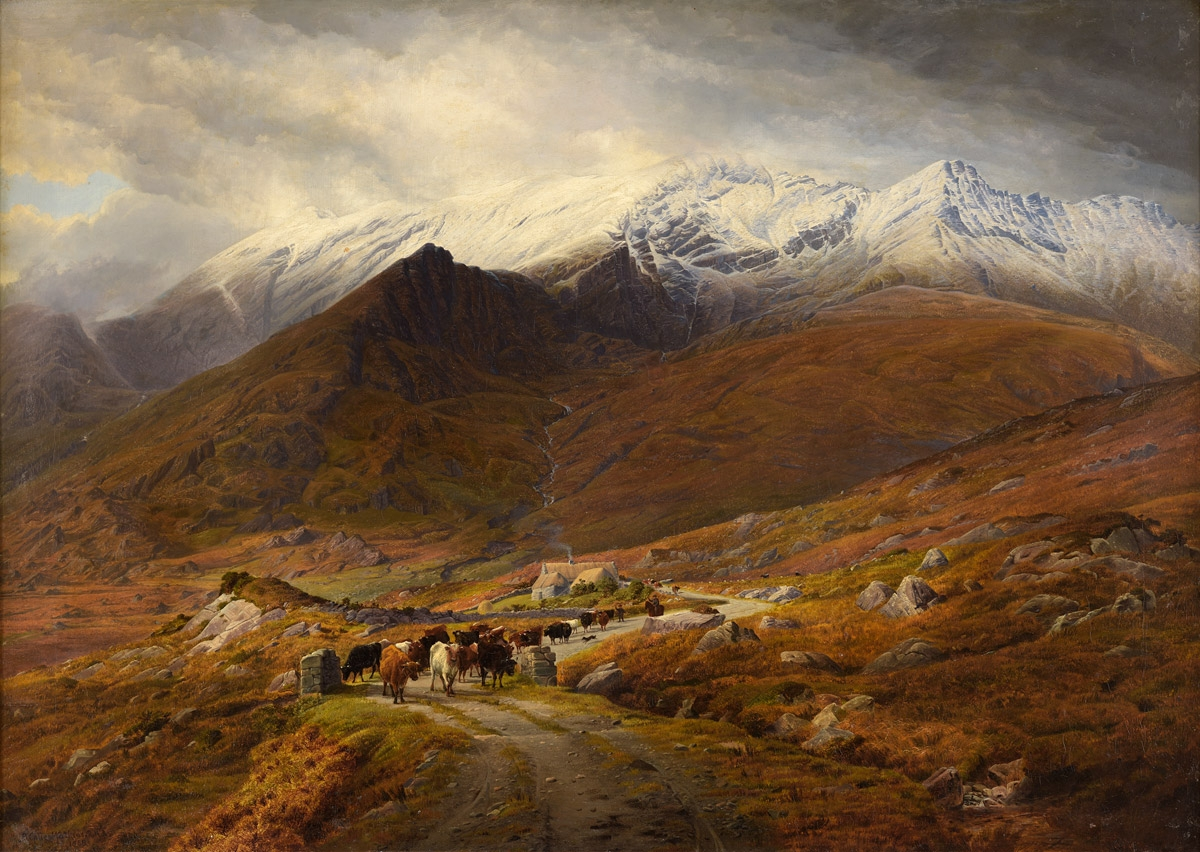
Landscape near Killarney, (1869)

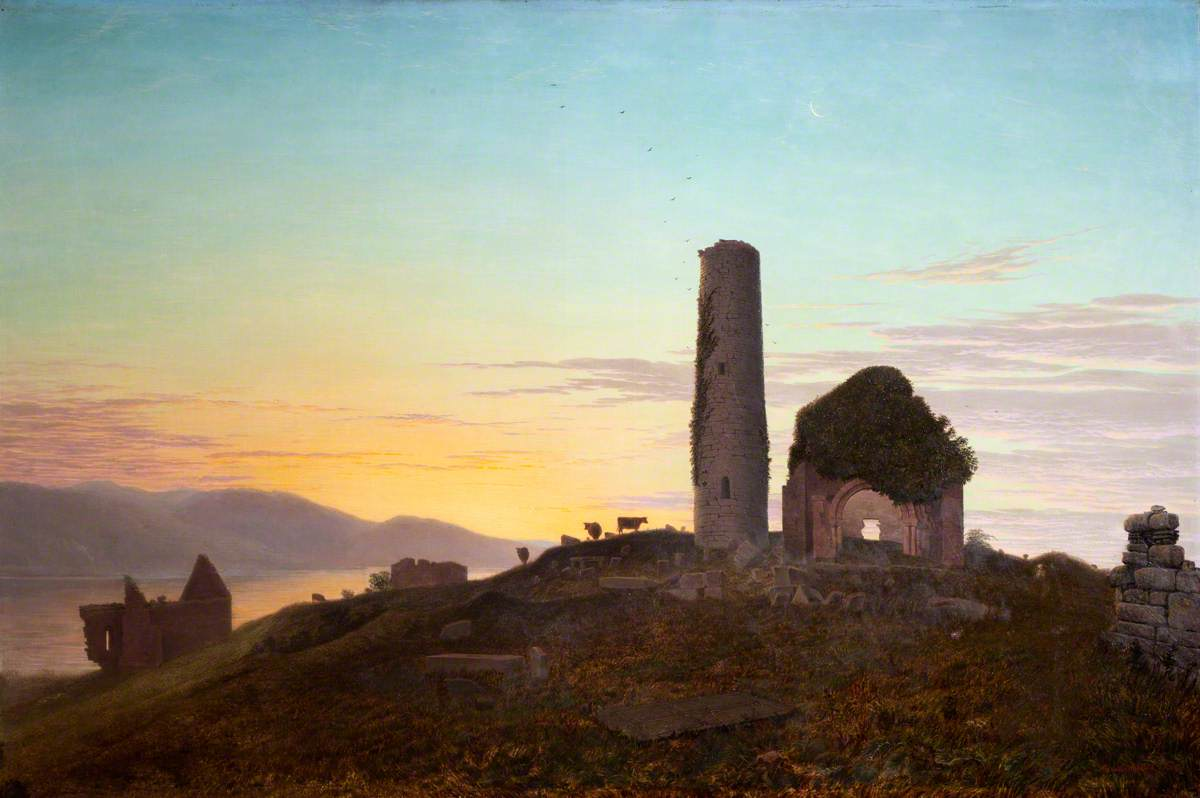
Ecclesiastical Ruins on Inniscaltra, or Holy Island, Lough Derg, Co. Galway, after Sunset: "This Island is One of Great Historic Interest" – Petrie, (c. 1863), Ulster Museum

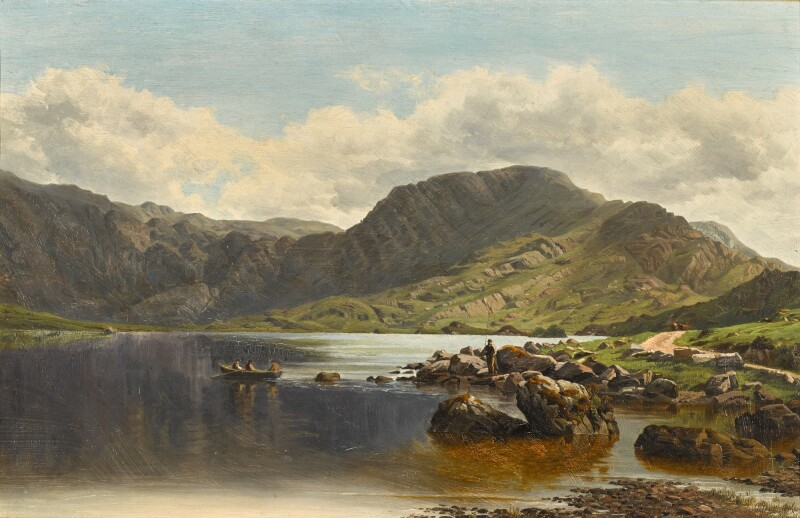
Cloon Lake, Glencar, Co. Kerry

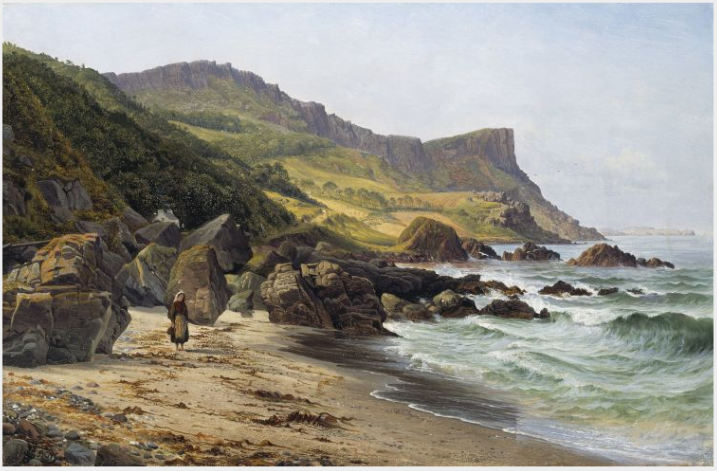
Murlough Bay and Fair Head, Coast of Antrim, (c. 1860), National Gallery of Ireland
