= 4-Methyl-2,4-bis(4-hydroxyphenyl)pent-1-ene =

Names
- Preferred IUPAC name 4,4′-(4-Methylpent-1-ene-2,4-diyl)diphenol

Identifiers
CAS Number	13464-24-9
3D model (JSmol)	Interactive image
Abbreviations	MBP
ChEBI	CHEBI:31129
ChemSpider	75331
ECHA InfoCard	100.151.037
EC Number	622-258-9
KEGG	C13625
PubChem CID	83494
UNII	TZ5YWX57VV
CompTox Dashboard (EPA)	DTXSID0065482
- InChI: InChI=1S/C18H20O2/c1-13(14-4-8-16(19)9-5-14)12-18(2,3)15-6-10-17(20)11-7-15/h4-11,19-20H,1,12H2,2-3H3 Key: MZLYLGGRVAFGBY-UHFFFAOYSA-N
- SMILES: Oc1ccc(cc1)C(CC(/c2ccc(O)cc2)=C)(C)C

Properties
Chemical formula	C_{18}H_{20}O_{2}
Molar mass	268.356 g·mol^{−1}
Density	1.102 g/cm^{3}

Hazards
- GHS labelling
Pictograms	(GHS07: Exclamation mark) (GHS09: Environmental hazard)
Signal word	Warning
Hazard statements	H315, H319, H335, H410
Precautionary statements	P261, P264, P271, P273, P280, P302+P352, P304+P340, P305+P351+P338, P312, P321, P332+P313, P337+P313, P362, P391, P403+P233, P405, P501
- Except where otherwise noted, data are given for materials in their standard state (at 25 °C [77 °F], 100 kPa). Infobox references

4-Methyl-2,4-bis(4-hydroxyphenyl)pent-1-ene (MBP) is a metabolite of bisphenol A (BPA). MBP has potent estrogenic activity in vitro and in vivo, up to thousandfold stronger than BPA. It may also play a role in neuronal cell apoptosis and may increase risk for several forms of cancer.

== Structure and reactivity ==
MBP is a phenol derivative with a 3D structure similar to progesterone. It therefore also shows a similar reactivity and binding to progesterone binding sites in the body. Due to its increased length compared to BPA, MBP binds stronger to progesterone binding sites than the unmetabolized BPA.

== Synthesis and metabolism ==
BPA is manufactured by acid catalyzed condensation of acetone and phenol, the industrially scaled process is widely known and studied. After ingestion of BPA mammals can metabolize it to form MBP as one of the major active metabolites. A synthetic way to make MBP has also been reported. In this research, BPA is heated to 240 °C under reduced pressure and in the presence of a catalytic amount of sodium hydroxide. The formed 4-isopropenylphenol then dimerizes to form MBP.

== Use and availability ==
MBP has no currently known uses; however, BPA has been widely used in plastic food packing such as bottles and coatings of metal cans, to protect the food from direct contact with metal. The FDA has assured that accidental consumption of packaging material can occur, but in safe doses. Due to widespread use of BPA, more waste is produced that poses a potential threat to aquatic organisms. In a recently conducted study, statistical data was gathered to assess pollution levels of BPA across the world. Across 31 countries the highest BPA levels were found in fish – 9340 ng/g and it made up 71% of the researched species (117 out of 162). There are also 55 countries which have reported BPA levels with the highest geometric levels of BPA (ng/L) being observed in Iran, Taiwan, Nigeria and Singapore.

== Mechanism of action ==
=== Estrogen antagonism ===
MBP shares similarities with BPA, being one of its active metabolites. Along these, its main mechanism of action is thus also comparable. MBP is an endocrine disruptor. To be more precise, it is an antagonist for estrogen receptor ER-β. It binds to this receptor instead of estrogen. This receptor is important for the regulation oncogene expression. Uncontrolled activation may lead to an increased risk of ER-regulated cancers such as breast-, ovarian-, uterine-, and prostate cancer.

=== Progresterone antagonism ===
Computational studies have shown that MBP can function antagonistically to progesterone within the human progesterone receptor. With the potency of binding to the receptor being calculated as numerically close to that of progesterone itself. The uncontrolled signalling via hPR during crucial times could lead to adverse effects. The main concern being the possibility of this happening during pregnancy. It would have a similar effect as antiprogresteron, possibly inducing labour and resulting in a miscarriage. BPA, MBP's precursor, has been shown to have toxic effect on oocyte maturation, and it is thought that MBP could have a similar such pathway.

=== Kinase targets ===
MBP is also predicted to target multiple kinases. The most notable among these being CAMK2G, CAMK2D, ERK/Akt, and RIPK1. CAMK2G and CAMK2D belong to the same calcium/calmodulin dependent protein kinase subfamily. These kinases play important roles in signalling pathways in the cardiovascular system. CAMK2G and CAMK2D have been shown to be critical within cardiac remodeling. While the role and function of these kinases is known, the exact mode of action and effect of MBP upon them remains unexplored.

ERK and Akt are two kinases regulating the cellular signalling surrounding apoptosis of neuronal cells. MBP interferes with the regular signalling of these two kinases, causing cell death through the activation of ERK and inactivation of Akt. This mechanism of cell death could be a sign of MBP being a risk factor for the development of neurodegenerative diseases. Aside from possibly interfering with ERK/Akt directly, it has also been shown that MBP can target RIPK1. Which plays a role in cell death and inflammation. Including the activation of ERK and other mitogen-activated protein kinases.

=== eNOS inhibition ===
eNOS or endothelial nitric oxide synthase catalyses the nitric oxide formation within the cell lining of blood vessels. This nitric oxide factors in the process of cell proliferation as well as blood vessel formation and -alteration. The pathways controlled by eNOS also play key roles in the maintenance of vascular homeostasis. It has been shown that MBP inhibits the formation of the nitric oxides necessary for these signalling pathways. Thus possibly leading to detrimental effects to the growth of new blood vessels, and the continued homeostasis of existing ones.

== Efficacy and side effects ==
=== Efficacy ===
In a study where they research the affinity of MBP and BPA to estrogen receptors (ERα and ERβ) the potency varied among the different assay methods but the estrogenicity of MBP was several-fold to several thousand-fold higher than BPA.

=== Adverse effects ===
MBP just like BPA may be linked to the development of diabetes mellitus. BPA is also linked to disorders of reproductive function, obesity, and cancer which in turn might be linked to MBP.

== Toxicity ==
In humans there have been many accounts of MBP being connected to different apoptotic pathways. Namely apoptosis of type 2 alveolar epithelial cell (L2) through the AMPK-regulated endoplasmic reticulum (ER) stress-triggered pathway. Or cytotoxicity and death of Neuro-2a cells via the ERK activation and Akt inactivation-regulated mitochondria-dependent ER stress which supports that MBP may lead to the development of neurodegenerative diseases. As well as cytotoxicity and death on pancreatic β-cells via the interdependent activation of JNK and AMPKα, which also regulates the ER stress-triggered apoptotic downstream signalling pathway.

There has been evidence that BPA is linked to an increased risk of breast cancer in humans by disrupting estrogen receptors (ERα and ERβ) and exerting estrogenic effects. MBP also disrupts the balanced expression of ERα and ERβ, leading to the dominant expression of the ERβ protein in cancer cells at a much lower concentration.

There have been no reported incidents of human death by MBP directly, although there have been reports of humans with higher urinary BPA levels being of increased risk of all-cause mortality. Although there is no research done this might be indirectly caused by MBP.

== Effects on animals ==
A study of exposure to MBP to fertilized chicken eggs was performed to establish whether during development of the embryo vascular density is influenced. Blood vessel density was significantly reduced at MBP exposures of 20 and 40 μg/egg.

The avian embryo is a widely used model to examine the effects of endocrine disrupting compounds in female and male reproductive systems as many cellular mechanisms of reproductive system are shared between birds and mammals. In a study chicken embryos were exposed in ovo from an initial stage of gonad differentiation (embryonic day 4) and dissected two days before hatching (embryonic day 19). MBP-treated males exhibited retention of Müllerian ducts and feminization of the left testicle, while MBP administered females displayed a diminished left ovary. 4 out of 12 MBP exposed males were feminized to the degree that they were mistaken for females when observed. As MBP induced abnormal Müllerian duct retention and altered gonadal morphology in both male and female chicken embryos, it can possess estrogenic and possibly also antiestrogenic properties. The altered mRNA expression patterns in the left testis of MBP- treated males further strengthen the evidence of MBP-induced feminization of the embryos.

Embryonic development and hatchability of medaka eggs were affected by MBP treatment. Hatchability of fertilized eggs exposed to concentrations greater than 2500 μg/L of MBP over 14 days was significantly decreased when compared with the controls. Time to hatching of fertilized eggs exposed to over 313 μg/L of MBP was also significantly delayed when compared with the controls .

The estrogenic responses of MBP and BPA on adult male medaka were investigated. When treated with up to 111.1 μg/L of MBP, majority of male medakas died after 21 day of exposure due to swelling of abdomen. Mortality was not affected by BPA itself. The 96h median lethal concentration of MBP and BPA on Medaka was estimated to be 1640 and 13,900 μg/L (about 6.1 and 60.9 μM).

A study using ovariectomized rats (OVX) reported that an MBP concentration of 1000 μg/kg/day completely reversed the changes caused by OVX, and its activity was equivalent to that of 0.5 μg/kg/day estradiol, suggesting at least 500-fold higher estrogenic activity of MBP than BPA.
