= Thomas Alfred Jones (artist) =

Irish painter and President of the Royal Hibernian Academy

Sir Thomas Alfred Jones
- Born: c.1823 Ireland
- Died: 1893
- Education: Dublin Society's Drawing Schools; Continental studies
- Known for: Portraiture; genre painting; President of the Royal Hibernian Academy (1869–?)
- Movement: Victorian academic art
- Awards: Knighthood

Sir Thomas Alfred Jones (c.1823–1893) was an Irish portrait and genre painter and a President of the Royal Hibernian Academy (RHA). Active from the 1840s to the 1890s, he is known both for his society portraits and for his idealised depictions of rural Irish women, including the popular Molly Macree (National Gallery of Ireland) and Connemara Girls, rediscovered in 2016.

== Early life and education ==
Jones was born around 1823, though exact details remain uncertain. He was abandoned as a child and raised in Dublin by foster parents, the philanthropist Mr Archdale and his sisters.

In 1833 he was admitted to the Dublin Society's Drawing Schools. He later enrolled at Trinity College Dublin (1842–1844), leaving without a degree. Jones continued his training on the Continent.

== Career ==
=== Royal Hibernian Academy ===
Jones first exhibited at the Royal Hibernian Academy in 1841. He was elected an Associate (ARHA) in 1860 and became President of the RHA in 1869 following the death of Stephen Catterson Smith.

=== Genre painting ===
Jones was a prolific artist and the foremost portraitist of public figures throughout the second half of the nineteenth-century. He also produced a series of idealised scenes depicting rural Irish women of the west of Ireland, a subject that gained wide popularity in the Victorian period. These genre paintings align with the periods "Irish Colleen" tradition and are noted for their colours and sentimental but sympathetic portrayal of rural women in post-Famine Ireland.

=== Portraiture ===
Jones worked extensively as a society portrait painter, producing formal likenesses of civic, political and professional figures in nineteenth-century Ireland. His portrait practice was rooted in academic training, characterised by precise draughtsmanship, smooth modelling of the face and a restrained, ceremonial presentation.

He was frequently commissioned by municipal bodies, professional institutions and prominent families, reflecting his status as a trusted painter of public representation. His portrait commissions included leading civic officials in Belfast, members of the Guinness family, medical practitioners, musicians, political leaders and aristocratic sitters.

Jones's portraits were typically intended for official or commemorative display, and many remain in institutional collections in Dublin and Belfast.

== Knighthood and later years ==
Jones was knighted by the Lord lieutenant, the Duke of Marlborough in 1880. He continued to exhibit into the 1890s and died in 1893.

== Selected works ==
- Molly Macree – National Gallery of Ireland
- Connemara Girls (1880) – Quinnipiac Great Hunger Museum
- Queen Victoria – Belfast City Hall
- James Hamilton – Belfast Harbour Commissioners
- Charles Stewart Parnell – Oak Room, Mansion House, Dublin
- Portrait series of the Lords Mayors of Belfast
- Earl and Countess of Bantry (1875)

== Legacy ==
Jones's reputation declined during the twentieth century but revived following the rediscovery of Connemara Girls. The 2018 Coming Home exhibition led to renewed scholarly interest in his role in Irish cultural identity and Victorian visual representation.
