= Feminization of agriculture =

In feminist economics, the feminization of agriculture refers to the measurable increase of women's participation in the agricultural sector, particularly in the developing world. The phenomenon started during the 1960s with increasing shares over time. In the 1990s, during liberalization, the phenomenon became more pronounced and negative effects appeared in the rural female population. Afterwards, agricultural markets became gendered institutions, affecting men and women differently. In 2009, the World Bank, FAO, IFAD found that over 80 per cent of rural smallholder farmers worldwide were women, due to men migrating to find work in other sectors. Out of all the women in the labor sector, the UN found 45-80% of them to be working in agriculture.

The term has also been applied to other phenomena, including increasing shares of women in the agricultural workforce, male outmigration from rural areas, decreasing women's opportunities in agricultural productivity, and lower rural pay due to skill exclusions. Activists have argued that the trend is dangerous and leads to food insecurity.

== Background ==
Women's role in the agricultural sector increased during the 1960s and has continued to grow. Women have been increasingly counted as heads of household, running their own farms without male assistance. These households are often poorer than their male counterparts. Their plot sizes are usually smaller and have less access to other productive resources, like education, tools, and seeds, something termed "investment poverty". Women agricultural workers are also less likely to have social connections, like credit and market networks.

In the rural environments there are two types of crop orientations, subsistence and export. Female-headed households are more likely to be subsistence-orientated, which are often poorer. Export farmers are more likely to have substantial land endowments and to be male-headed. After structural adjustments, export farmers became more vulnerable to price shocks, and women within this category more so. Female-headed households also became more likely to change from high-value export crops to subsistence.

Women running their own farms is a historically new trend, as men have traditionally done the heavy farm work. The use of the plow has typically only involved men, and in many regions, men still dominate. Typically, reliance on the plow has been associated with male-dominated farming, which leads to crop inefficiencies if they leave.

=== Diversification ===
These policies taxed the then-profitable agricultural sector while raising tariffs on imports. The revenue was used to support urban government-sponsored enterprises. This created higher-paying jobs in the city, which, in combination with high taxes on agriculture, started drawing men towards cities. This early migration period was the first attempt to diversify income, mainly in-country. Women remained behind to farm alone and do wage work locally. With male migration, the amount of labor dedicated to farming fell, as women retained child care responsibilities.

This trend continued during liberalization, when taxes (and subsidies) for agriculture were removed, causing declines in agricultural incomes. These same structural adjustments removed support for the industries that held many jobs in the city, which further depressed incomes.

=== Discrimination ===
Social norms affect how men and women approach and are rewarded from the market. Men are seen as the breadwinners and thus are expected to be paid more and work year-round. Women are seen as secondary laborers, and thus tend to work in seasonal or otherwise temporary jobs. These positions are low wage and low skill. Women are not expected, nor encouraged to compete for higher wages or said jobs. Women who attempt to bargain for higher wages are seen as "distressed", and viewed negatively.

Export oriented agro-business perpetuates these stereotypes. Often women work seasonal jobs and aren't considered for permanent positions. These low-skill entry-level jobs have low wages with no raises. Sometimes these positions require literacy and women wouldn't be eligible, as rates of education and literacy are higher in men than in women.

=== Food insecurity ===
The feminization of agriculture has been associated with food insecurity through poverty and limited crop yields. Structural adjustment of the 1990s abolished fertilizer and seed subsidies to rural farmers. This has decreased crop growing potential and profitability. With some household's being on the brink of food-insecurity. In an attempt to compensate for lack of fertilizer, some have switched to lower quality crops. Measurable effects on rural mortality rates have started to become apparent.

== Theoretical causes ==
=== Economic liberalization ===
Liberalization critics argue the phenomenon is a result of failed liberalization policies. During the 1980s there was a shift away from the import substitution policies towards economic liberalization. The aim was to cut the government deficits and increase revenue through export led growth. It was believed that free markets would encourage growth through privatization.

Reductions of the budget deficits often required austerity. Included in these policies was the disassembly of state entities, social support mechanisms, and various subsidies. The reduction of tariffs led to instability of farm income, due to market swings. Farmers have begun to grow more conservative crops and rely on wage labor, rather than farm income.

When social subsidies on education and health were removed, women became responsible for supplementing the increased cost. This required an increase in their income, which led to diversification, and thus male out-migration. Women then remain on the farm, with the remainder of the family. In both Africa and Latin America male migration has been associated with feminization of the rural agricultural economy.

Liberalization also removed governmental institutions beneficial to farmers. Before liberalization there existed public credit facilities, as well as input assistance (fertilizer and seeds etc.), and marketing. In the period after liberalization, these institutions were never replaced by private mechanisms. Smaller farmers who once benefited from these, now have reduced productivity. These reductions, have negatively affected rural populations.

=== Other causes ===
In Africa, regional issues affect the male rural population. The prevalence of disease (mainly HIV/AIDS) and warfare have reduced male populations. These effects can combine migration leading to substantial differences in gender. In the Congo there are as many as 170 women working for every 100 men in agriculture.

== Criticism ==
The most common criticism is the lack of available data. A prominent concern is how to interpret the available data. The increase in women's participation in agriculture can be interpreted several ways. One is that more women are working in agriculture than were previously. The second is that men are working less, and women have remained are constant, and thus the share of women is rising. A third possibility is that neither have changed and that recent data have only begun to capture the women already working in agriculture.

Determining causation has also been controversial. Without better data it is difficult to differentiate the regional trends from the universal. The developing world is broad and poorly understood. It is likely that a trend affecting one region will not apply to another.

== Activism ==
=== Organizations ===
Several organizations have become concerned with the detrimental effects, and have sponsored projects.

The Food and Agriculture Organization of the United Nations works to improve food security. They stress increasing access to many necessary inputs to productive agriculture, including credit, education and training, and land. They also promote the development of rural female farmers organizations. There has also been a move towards updating the legal codes of countries to give women the legal rights of property ownership and credit, which can allow for increased food security.

ActionAid is also involved in activism towards the alleviation of poverty. Two of their main purposes is to argue for gender equality and women's rights. They are involved in adult literacy and other education projects. They argue for a gender approach to agricultural development. In 2008, the HungerFree Women project was created to address the issues facing rural women. The project was designed to enhance give media visibility to rural women, address discriminatory laws, prioritize women's rights and organize rural women.

=== Policies ===
With women as a large portion of agriculture workers, they are often denied power to make decisions about resources and access they have to land. Advocates have argued for policy change to address concerns. Actionaid argues for increasing funding to the agricultural sector for rural development. The World Bank argued that development policy should increase access to the agricultural resources that men have (e.g. land, credit facilities, health care).

== See also ==
- Feminist economics
- Feminization of poverty
- Feminization of migration
- Women and the environment through history
- Women in agriculture in Afghanistan
- Women in agriculture in India
- Women in agriculture in Japan
- Women in agriculture in the United Kingdom
