= Feminization =

Feminization most commonly refers to:

- Feminization (sociology), a perceived societal shift of gender roles toward the characteristically "female"
- Feminization (biology), the hormonally induced development of female sexual characteristics
- Feminization (sexual activity), a sexual or lifestyle practice where a person assumes a female role

Feminization may also refer to:

== Health care ==
- Facial feminization surgery, an umbrella term for gender-affirming reconstructive surgical procedures that alter the face towards a female morphology
- Feminizing hormone therapy, a type of hormone therapy and gender-affirming therapy to change secondary sex characteristics
- Feminizing surgery, surgical procedures to provide physical traits more comfortable and affirming to an individual's gender identity
- Voice feminization, the desired goal of changing a perceived male sounding voice to a perceived female sounding voice

== Trends ==
- Feminization of language, the process of making a word or name female
- Feminization of migration, a trend where a higher rate of women migrate to labor or marriage
- Feminization of poverty, a phenomenon in which women represent disproportionate percentages of the world's poor
- Feminisation of the workplace, the trend towards greater employment of women, and of men willing and able to operate with these more 'feminine' modes of interaction
  - Feminization of agriculture, the measurable increase of women's participation in agriculture

== See also ==
- Feminine
