= McDonough Bolyard Peck =

McDonough Bolyard Peck, Inc. (MBP)
- Company type: Private
- Industry: Construction Management
- Founded: 1989
- Founders: Frank McDonough, Charles Bolyard, Blake Peck
- Headquarters: Fairfax, Virginia, U.S.
- Number of locations: 11 offices in the United States
- Area served: International
- Key people: Charles E. Bolyard (President & CEO); Blake Peck (Chief Operating Officer); Frank McDonough(Chairman Emeritus)
- Services: Consulting, commissioning, cost estimating, program management, constructibility review, CPM scheduling, inspection building information modeling, and facilities management
- Number of employees: 355
- Website: McDonough Bolyard Peck, Inc

McDonough Bolyard Peck, Inc. (MBP) is a construction management company headquartered in Fairfax, Virginia. It provides construction management services such as cost estimating, value engineering, constructability review, CPM scheduling, inspection, building information modeling, and facilities management. The firm is also active in many forms of Alternative Disputes Resolution (ADR). The firm serves private and governmental owners, designers, contractors, developers and attorneys on a wide range of transportation, building, plant, environmental and utilities projects.

== Operations ==
McDonough Bolyard Peck was founded in 1989 by Frank McDonough, Charlie Bolyard, and Blake Peck. The corporate headquarters are located in Fairfax, Virginia, while branch offices are maintained in Maryland, Georgia, Virginia, New York, Pennsylvania, Florida and North Carolina.

== Major projects ==
=== Airports ===
- USCG Elizabeth City Airport: North Carolina
- Raleigh-Durham International Airport: North Carolina
- Roanoke Regional Airport: Roanoke, Virginia
- Dulles International Airport: Dulles, Virginia

=== Federal ===
- United States Capitol Visitor Center: Washington, DC
- National Geospatial-Intelligence Agency Headquarters, New Campus East: Springfield, VA
- National Gallery of Art: Washington, DC
- Naval Facilities (NAVFAC) Washington Base Relocation and Closing (BRAC): Washington, DC

=== Healthcare ===
- Durham Regional Hospital: Durham, North Carolina
- Walter Reed National Military Medical Center: Washington, D.C.
- Burell Center Renovation Project: Roanoke, Virginia
- Harbour Inn Convalescent Center: Baltimore
- University of Virginia Hospital Renovation: Charlottesville, Virginia
- Ft. Belvoir Community Hospital: Ft. Belvoir, Virginia

=== Higher education ===
- University of North Carolina Wilmington School of Education: Wilmington, North Carolina
- Duquesne University: Pittsburgh
- University of Virginia: Charlottesville, Virginia
- George Mason University: Fairfax, Virginia
- Virginia Tech: Blacksburg, Virginia
- University of Maryland, College Park: College Park, Maryland
- Virginia State University Arena: Richmond, Virginia

=== Judicial ===
- Arlington County Courthouse and Police Facility: Arlington County, Virginia
- Fairfax County Courthouse Expansion: Fairfax, Virginia
- Maricopa County Jail: Phoenix, Arizona
- Montgomery County Correctional Facility: Seneca, Maryland

=== K-12 education ===
- Washington-Lee High School: Arlington County, Virginia
- Kettle Run Elementary School: Warrenton, Virginia
- Patterson Elementary School: Washington, D.C.
- Port Towns Elementary School: Bladensburg, Maryland

=== Office and Mixed Use ===
- Liberty Place II: Philadelphia
- Jefferson at Penn Quarter: Washington, D.C.
- Harbor Point West Condominiums: Woodbridge, Virginia

=== Heavy industrial ===
- Johnstown Channel Rehabilitation: Johnstown, Pennsylvania

=== Transportation ===
- Springfield Interchange: Springfield, Virginia
- I-64 Battlefield Boulevard Reconstruction: Hampton Roads, Virginia
- Dulles Corridor Metrorail Project, Silver Line (WMATA), Phase 2: Virginia
- I-264 Military Highway Interchange
- ITS "Smart Road": Blacksburg, Virginia
- US Route 11 Memorial Bridge: Radford, Virginia

=== International projects ===
- US Embassy: Kampala, Uganda
- World Bank Country Office: Dhaka, Bangladesh
- Ertan Dam: Sichuan, China
- Sarlux IGCC Power Plant: Sarroch, Italy
- Nathpa Jhakri Hydro-Electric Project Himachal Pradesh, India
