= Women in agriculture in Afghanistan =

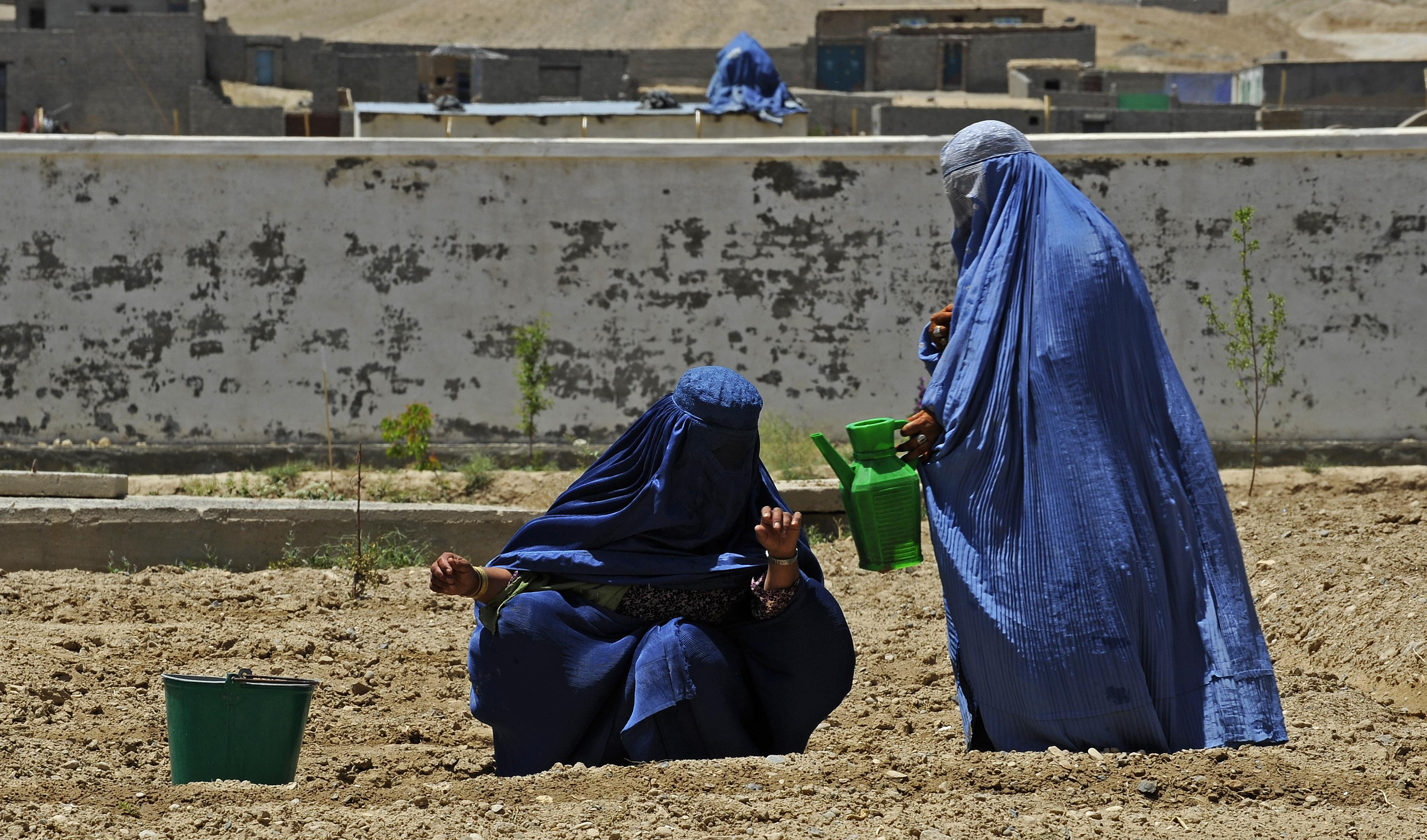
Two women wearing burqas involved in agriculture at the Qalat Department of Women's Affairs, which is located in the Zabul province of Afghanistan.

Women's roles in agriculture in Afghanistan have been shaped by the cultural landscape of the country. Women comprise nearly half of the farming and agricultural workforce in Afghanistan. In recent years, women have been contributing to farm work and be earning money or barter goods for their contributions.

== History ==
Like the Amish in the United States, Afghan men traditionally dominated farming in Afghanistan while their women were occasionally used to help work fields or tend livestock. Seed production has also traditionally been done primarily by male farmers in Afghanistan.

Women have lower land rights in Afghanistan, though the Constitution can be interpreted to allow women to own land and Islam's Sharia law has provisions for widows and daughters to inherit a share of land. Women who own or manage land in some parts of the country are unable to sell it, and the land is passed down through inheritance. Many women have also traditionally been restricted in their movements and are often unable to travel outside of their villages.

== Modern farming ==
Today, women make up almost half of the agricultural workforce, though, in many rural areas, they are still marginalized. Women's contributions to agriculture in Afghanistan are often "meagerly rewarded." Women have a high rate of contribution to opium, livestock, and dairy products, but rarely receive payment. Yet women's participation in agriculture is often considered "key, not only to ensuring increased agricultural production but also for improving food and nutrition security." Women are "a force for stability in their communities." They are also seen as agents of change in their households.

Women have been instrumental in organizing small village farm unions in Afghanistan in recent years. Women's work with the farming unions has also raised their status in the areas they live in, where they are no longer known as wives and mothers of men, but instead by their roles in the union. In addition, women have helped introduce new types of crops to the areas they are farming such as cabbage, cauliflower, tomatoes, and beans which compete better on the market.

In Parwan-Bastan, women have had the opportunity to become involved in producing seeds and have created "village-based seed enterprises." Outside of Kabul, farmer training programs for women have been implemented since 2009. These programs allow women to earn their own money and achieve financial Independence.

Non-governmental organizations (NGOs), such as Global Partnership for Afghanistan (GPFA), have helped women become more involved in farming. Such initiatives have helped revitalize orchards, constructed cold-storage facilities and, provided their products and sources. Another program that has helped women with their agricultural business is the National Solidarity Program (NSP) which was developed by the Afghanistan Ministry of Rural Rehabilitation and Development in 2003. NSP provides agricultural resources to women, which may include a grant of chickens, tax breaks, and marketing for their businesses.

== Gender-based discrimination ==
Some Afghan women face difficulties selling their product because of their gender. One woman from Baghlan province described her own experience: "It really irritates me when I meet shopkeepers to talk about selling my fruit and they tell me, 'Go and send a man from your family because you are a woman.'"

== See also ==
- Women in Afghanistan
