= Women in agriculture in the United Kingdom =

History of British women in agriculture

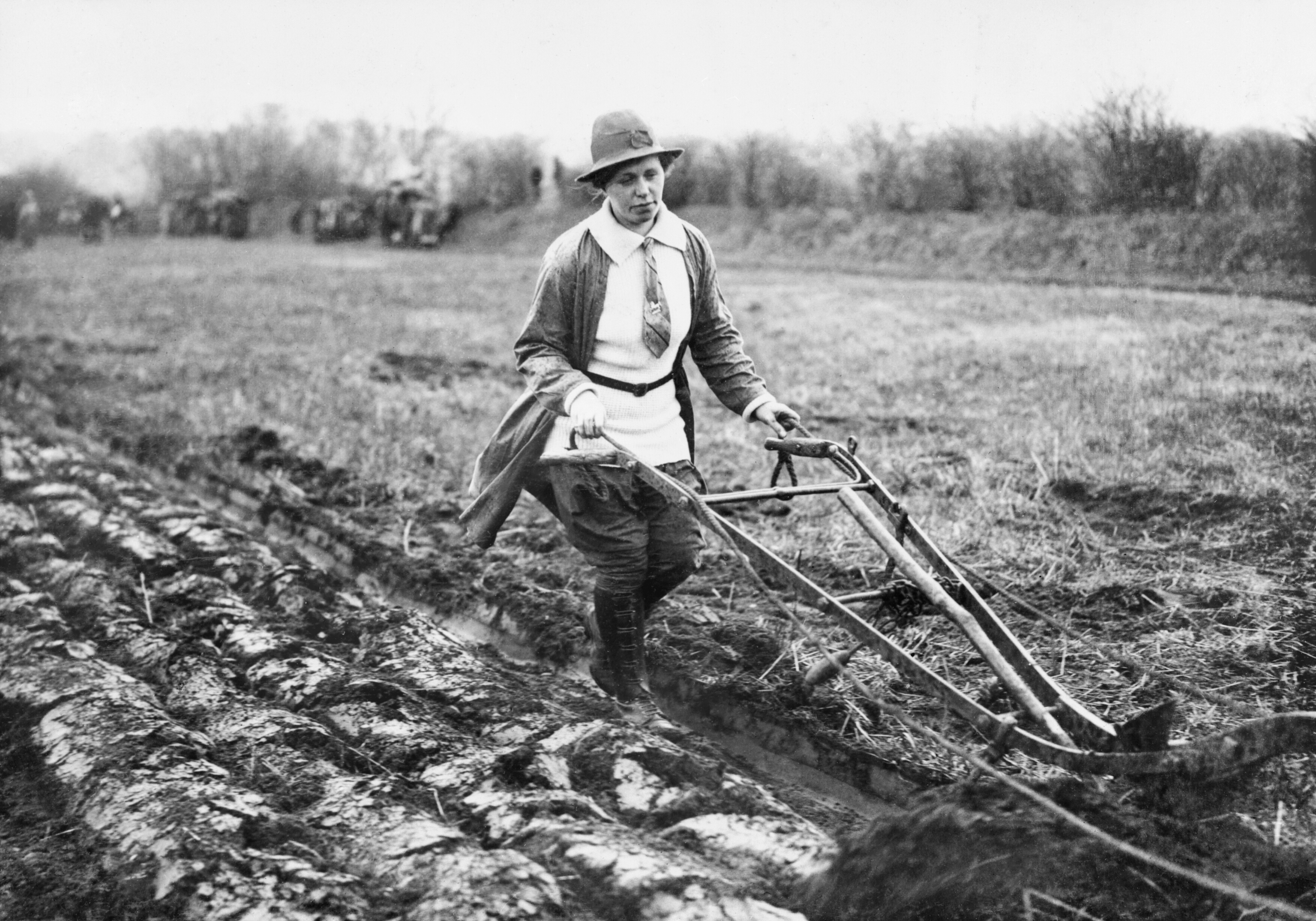
Member of the Women's Land Army operates a single-furrow plough on a British farm in 1914.

Women were historically rarely farm owners in agriculture in the United Kingdom, but the number who own or lease farms is rising rapidly in the 21st century; by 2013 there were 25,000.

A 2014 survey by Farmers Weekly showed that 59% of women felt that agriculture was at least as good as other industries in equal opportunities for women. Women were also bringing money into farms through initially small diversifications into other businesses. Farmers Weekly ran a television show, Farmers Apprentice, presented by the Leicestershire dairy farmer Philippa Hall. In March 2016, the then Environment Secretary Liz Truss celebrated International Women's Day with women farmers. In Scotland, too, the government and the National Farmers Union Scotland are working to promote women in agriculture in the 21st century. In February 2018, the 110 year old National Farmers' Union of England and Wales elected the beef farmer Minette Batters as their first female president.

== See also ==
- Women's Land Army ("Land Girls")
- Working for Gardeners Association
