= Rural women =

Women from rural communities

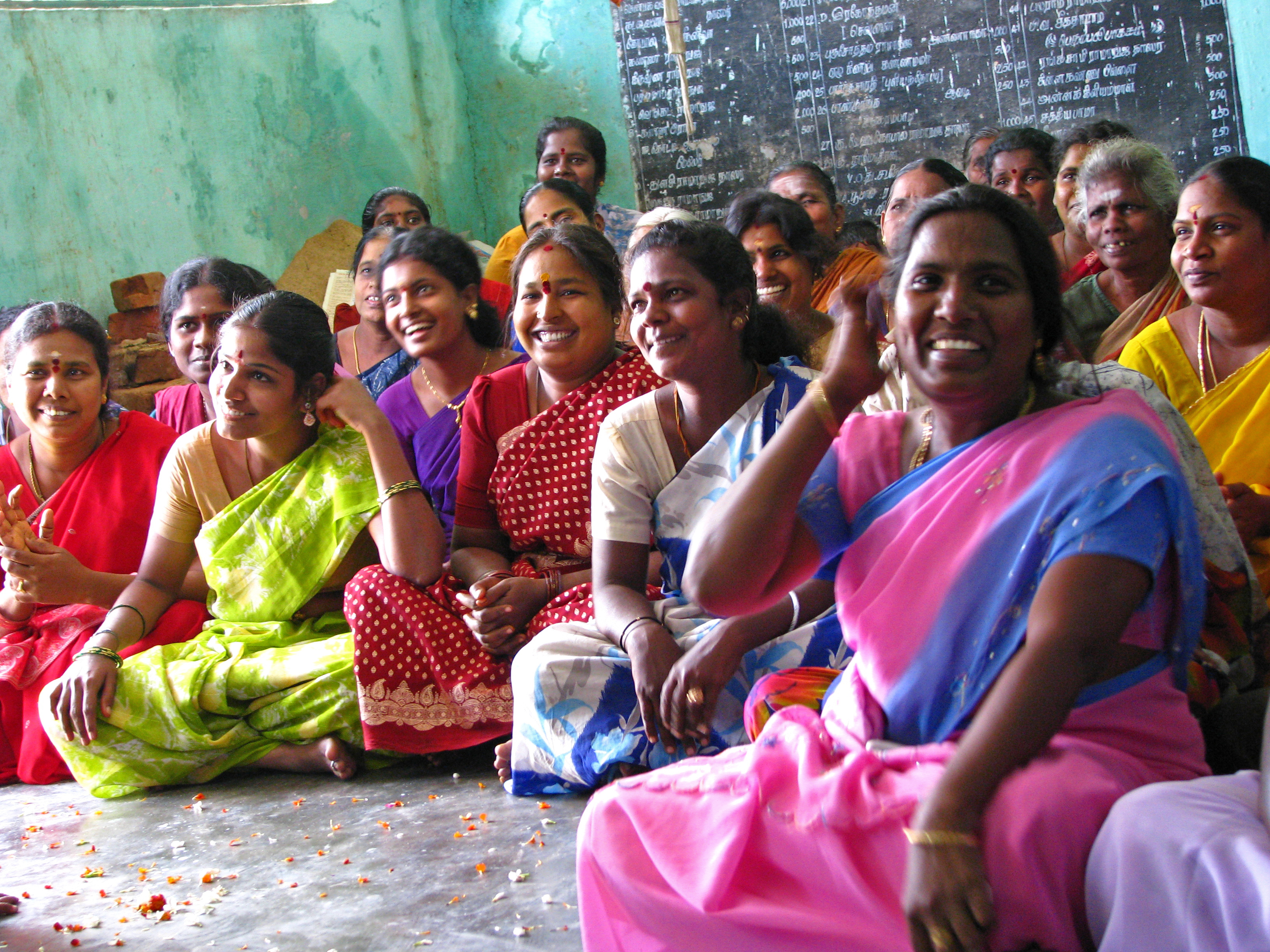
Rural women in a community meeting related to microfinace in India. Rural women play an important part of rural development the world over -- when given economic access and opportunities, they transform their communities investing in infrastructure and community well-being.

Rural women play a fundamental role in rural communities around the world providing care and being involved in number of economic pursuits such as subsistence farming, petty trading and off-farm work. In most parts of the world, rural women work very hard but earn very little.

Women often suffer discrimination because they are not allowed to have the same ownership of land as men. Most of what they earn does not directly stay in their control, because of unequal gender roles or discrimination.

Empowering rural women can help not only with alleviating the poverty of individual women and families, but also with empowering the entire community—changing access to education, employment and other benefits of rural development. To recognize this, the international community often sets international development goals that track investment and impact on lives of rural women, and the United Nations sponsors the International Day of Rural Women.

== Poverty ==
Rural women are particularly disadvantaged, both as poor and as women. Women in both rural and urban areas face a higher risk of poverty and more limited economic opportunities than their male counterparts. The number of rural women living in extreme poverty rose by about 50 percent over the past twenty years. Women in rural poverty live under the same harsh conditions as their male counterparts, but experience additional cultural and policy biases which undervalue their work in both the informal, and if accessible, formal labor markets. The 2009 World Survey states that "women play an active role in agriculture and rural livelihoods as unpaid family labour, independent farmers and wage labour, often without access to land, credit and other productive assets."

Women's contribution to the rural economy is generally underestimated, as women perform a disproportionate amount of care work that often goes unrecognized because it is not seen as economically productive. Though in some nations cultural and societal norms prevent women from working outside the home, in other countries, especially in rural communities in Africa, women work as major food producers, improving household food and income security. Families in extreme poverty are even more dependent on women's work both inside and outside the home, resulting in longer days and harder work for women The feminization of poverty is a concept that is applicable in both urban and rural settings.

== Role in agricultural communities ==
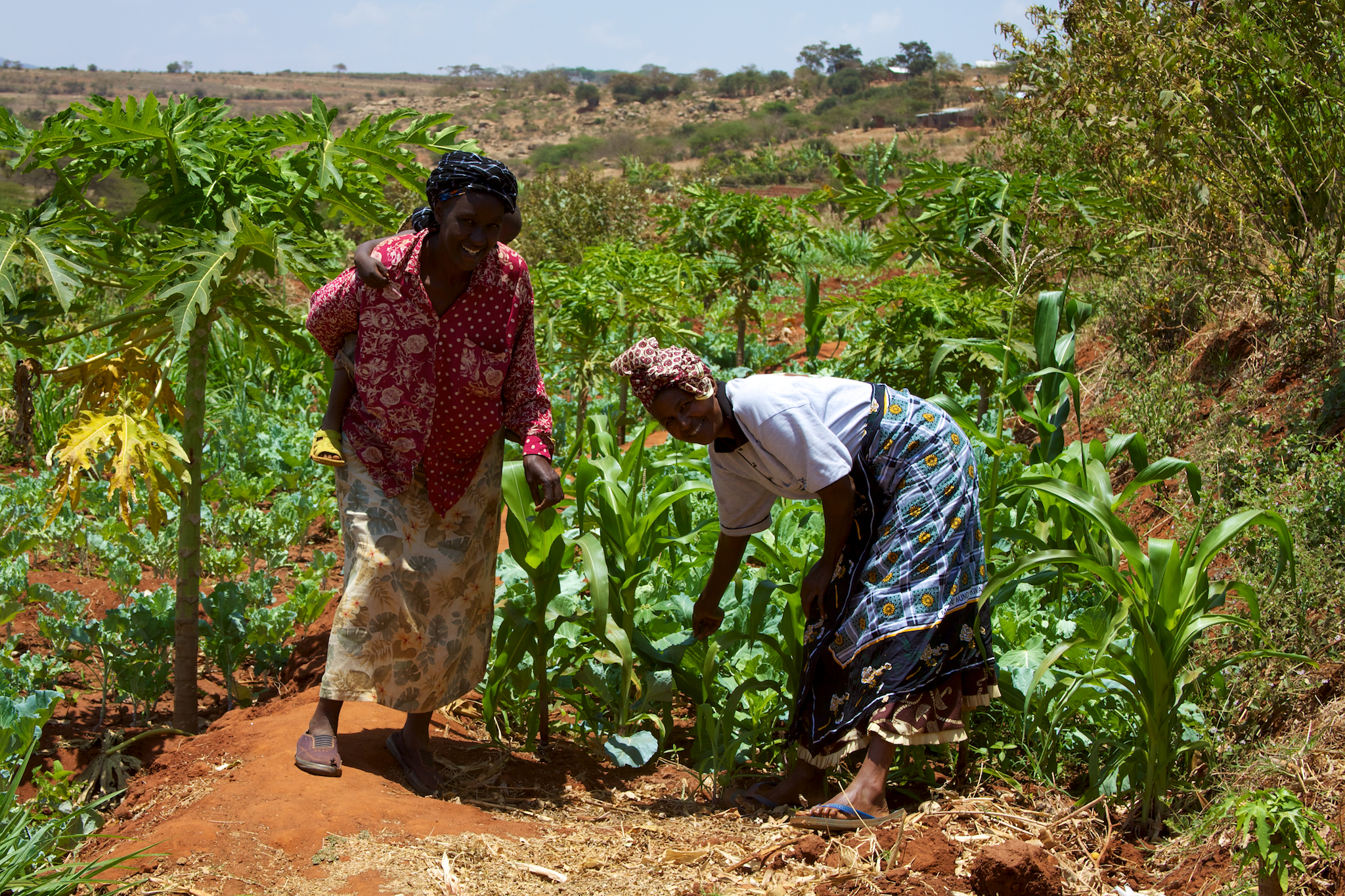
Historically, women have faced a number of challenges when participating in agriculture, with patriarchal societies frequently limiting how much agency and control women in agricultural communities have over their own labor. However, with the Feminization of agriculture, the process where men leave rural areas for urban jobs, leaving behind more women tending the land, more women operate as smallholders (like these women in Kenya), playing a vital role in food security and rural economies.

Gender roles in agriculture are a frequent subject of study by sociologists and farm economists. Historians also study them, as they are important in understanding the social structure of agrarian, and even industrial, societies. Agriculture provides many job opportunities and livelihoods around the world. It can also reflect gender inequality and uneven distribution of resources and privileges among gender.

In particular, pastoralist, ethnic minority, indigenous and rural women continue to face numerous obstacles when trying to access and control natural resources, technological devices and agricultural services; also, they are not involved in processes of decision-making. Most of the time, such obstacles have their roots in practices of discrimination, which highly influence women's independence.

According to the Institute of Agriculture and Natural Resources, University of Nebraska-Lincoln, women usually have a harder time obtaining land, tools and knowledge than men, especially in developing countries. Several organizations such as Food and Agriculture Organization and independent research have indicated that increasing gender corporation can bring more profits and food security for the community.

In general, women account for a greater share of agricultural employment at lower levels of economic development, as inadequate education, limited access to basic infrastructure and markets, high-unpaid work burden and poor rural employment opportunities outside agriculture severely limit women’s opportunities for off-farm work.

Women make up well over 50 percent of the agricultural labour force in many sub-Saharan African countries. About half of the labour force in agriculture is female in several countries in Southeast Asia, including Cambodia, the Lao People’s Democratic Republic and Viet Nam.

Women who work in agricultural production tend to do so under highly unfavourable conditions. They tend to be concentrated in the poorest countries, where alternative livelihoods are not available, and they maintain the intensity of their work in conditions of climate-induced weather shocks and in situations of conflict.

Women are less likely to participate as entrepreneurs and independent farmers and are engaged in the production of less lucrative crops. Often, women are unpaid family workers or casual workers in agriculture. Social norms may also constrain women from producing crops and participating in activities dominated by men.

The gender gap in land productivity between female- and male managed farms of the same size is 24 percent. On average, women earn 18.4 percent less than men in wage employment in agriculture; this means that women receive 82 cents for every dollar earned by men.

=== Feminization of agriculture ===
In feminist economics, the feminization of agriculture refers to the measurable increase of women's participation in the agricultural sector, particularly in the developing world. The phenomenon started during the 1960s with increasing shares over time. In the 1990s, during liberalization, the phenomenon became more pronounced and negative effects appeared in the rural female population. Afterwards, agricultural markets became gendered institutions, affecting men and women differently. In 2009, the World Bank, FAO, IFAD found that over 80 per cent of rural smallholder farmers worldwide were women, due to men migrating to find work in other sectors. Out of all the women in the labor sector, the UN found 45-80% of them to be working in agriculture.

The term has also been applied to other phenomena, including increasing shares of women in the agricultural workforce, male outmigration from rural areas, decreasing women's opportunities in agricultural productivity, and lower rural pay due to skill exclusions. Activists have argued that the trend is dangerous and leads to food insecurity.

=== Impact on food security ===
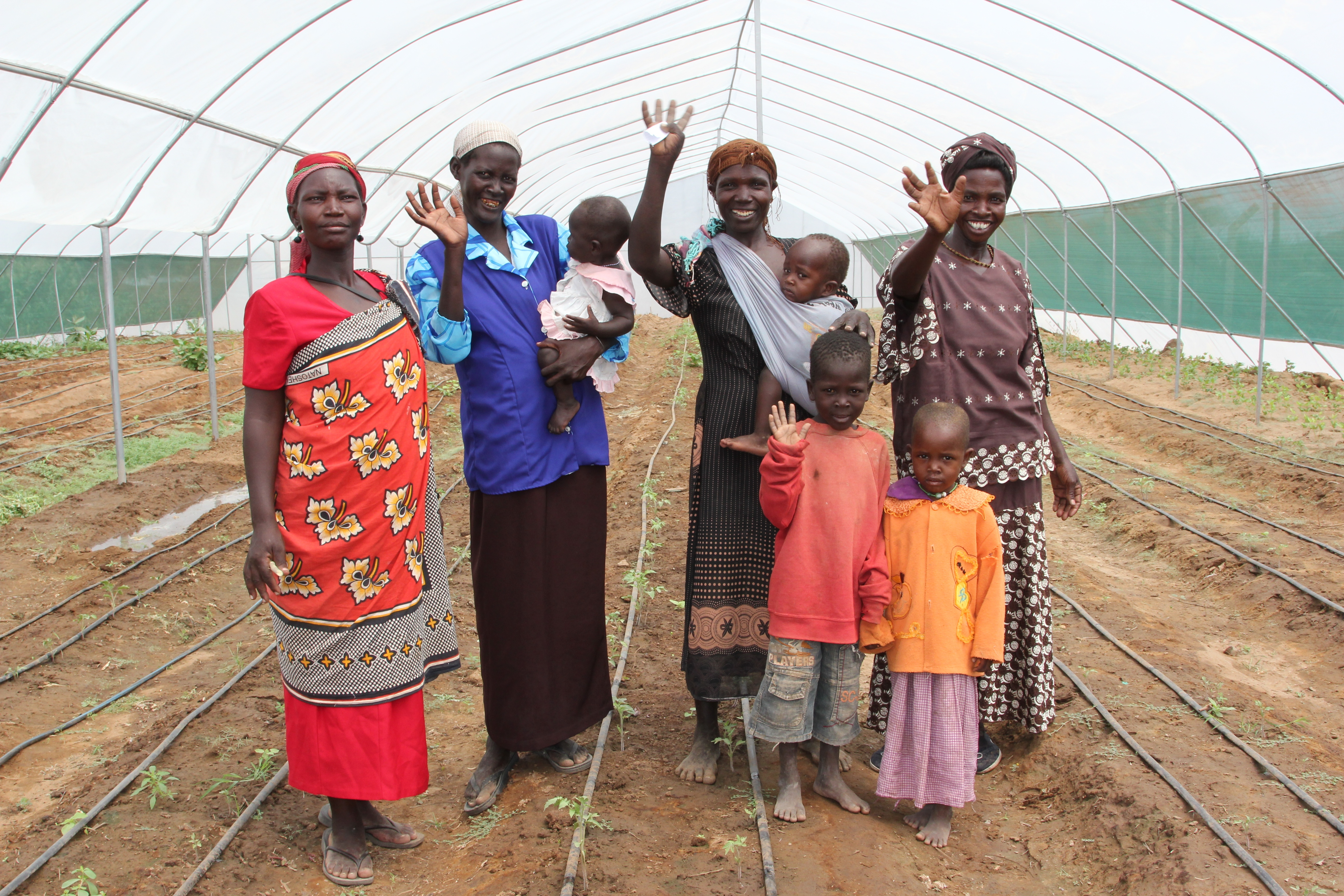
Female farmers in Kenya

Gender and Food security refers to how gender inequality shapes access to food, nutrition, and agricultural resources at global, national and household levels. Women play a central role in food production, particularly in developing countries, but often face structural barriers to land ownership, credit, technology, and decision-making power. These inequalities limit agricultural productivity and contribute to higher risks of food insecurity, especially among women and female-headed households.

Gender disparities affect all dimensions of food security, including food availability, access, utilization, and stability as defined by the Food and Agriculture Organization. Women access to land, markets, and financial resources remains more limited than men's while unequal division of unpaid labor and time constraints further restrict their participation in economic activities. Intra-household dynamics, including differences in bargaining power and resource allocation, also shape food distribution and nutritional outcomes.

Emerging challenges such as climate change, economic shocks, and conflict often disproportionately impact women due to existing inequalities in resource access and decision-making. Research from the Food and Agriculture Organization and the World Bank emphasizes that closing gender gaps in agricultue and strengthening women's land right, access to resources, and participation in policy processes can improve food security, enchance resilience, and reduce global hunger.

== See also ==
- Discrimination against people from rural areas
