= List of Pashto singers =

This is a list of Pashto-language singers.

- Rashid Ahmad Khan
- Asghar Yousafzai
- Zeek Afridi
- Gulzar Alam
- Ustad Awalmir
- Haroon Bacha
- Zeb Bangash
- Beltoon
- Farhad Darya
- G. M. Durrani
- Qamar Gula
- Hidayatullah
- Nazia Iqbal
- Bacha Zareen Jan
- Ubaidullah Jan
- Ghazala Javed
- Ali Baba Khan
- Hamayoon Khan
- Irfan Khan
- Laila Khan
- Wahid Khan Malyadam
- Bakhtiar Khattak
- Mangal
- Khyal Muhammad
- Rezwan Munawar
- Latif Nangarhari
- Naghma
- Nashenas
- Gul Panra
- Munir Sarhadi
- Aryana Sayeed
- Raheem Shah
- Shafi Muhammad Shah
- Rafiq Shinwari
- Mashooq Sultan
- Sardar Ali Takkar
- Shah Wali
- Ahmad Zahir
- Gul Zaman
- Zarsanga

== Musical bands ==
- Khumariyaan

== See also ==
- List of Afghan singers
