= Ivan Shafiq =

- Born: 12 September 1975 (age 50); Peshawar, Pakistan
- Genres: Pop rock, Classical, Semi-Classical, Ghazals
- Occupations: Producer, composer
- Instrument: keyboard,
- Website: Official website

Ivan Shafiq (Pashto: اون شفیق) is a Pakistani Pashto music composer, songwriter, music producer, musician, and philanthropist. Ivan Shafiq's works are noted for integrating Eastern classical music with electronic music, world music and traditional orchestral arrangements. With an in-house studio Ivan's film-scoring career began during the early 1990s. Working in Pashto film and Music industries, Ivan is one of the Pakistan's all-time best-selling recording artists. In a notable two-decade career, he has been acclaimed for redefining contemporary Pashto film music and contributing to the success of several films.

== Songography ==
Ivan Shafiq productions exceed 1000 audios and videos. The following is a list of top 100 songs.

Year	Song	Artist
2016	Janan De Janan	Shaan Khan and Gul Panra
2016	Sta Da Ishq Baranona	Shaan Khan and Gul Panra
2016	Namirawan	Quraish Baryal
2016	Roz Gaar E Maa	Shahzad Adeel
2016	Entezar	Omid Zaher
2016	Daagh E Ishq	Homayun Sakhi
2016	Hejran	Wais Jahion
2016	Faryad	Zaheer Akhter
2016	Pekhawar Zalmi(Official Anthem Of Psl)	Hamayoon Khan and Gul Panra
2015	Mor - Dawood Tanin	
2015	Madaram	Sharif Pajman
2015	Sarbaze Watan	Seeta Qasemi
2015	Amadam	Haris Mehran
2015	Nadaan Malanga	Gul Panra
2015	Dil Mirawad	Seyar Walizada
2015	Jor Pa Khair	Shahzad Adeel
2015	Qissa	Wayan Honarjo
2015	Sta Lewanay Yam Intezar Me Kawa	Hamayun Khan
2015	Ze Yama Gul Panra	Gul Panra
2015	Qadardan Watana	Mirwais Nejrabi
2015	Khaterat	Quraish Baryal
2015	Wakhtona	Hamayoon Angar
2015	Khog Afghanistan	Quraish Baryal
2015	Qarara Rasha	Rabia Tabassum
2015	Baraan De Baraan	Ghazala Javed
2015	Bazar De Bazaar	Gul Panra
2015	Nasha Nasha She	Gul Panra
2015	Awara Shoma Za	Gul Panra
2015	Charta Baran Nashi	Yrooj Mohmand
2014	Rooh	Mansour Nazari
2014	Khaterat	Shafiq Mureed
2014	Sarzamine Madari	Zoobin Anwari
2014	Laka Shabnam	Hamayun
2014	Watansaran	Sara Shar
2014	Dokhtar Afghan	Farzana Naz
2014	Marhaba	Amir Zeb
2014	Dar En Ghurbat	Shafiq Mureed
2014	Morey	Hashmat Sahar
2014	Ta Sirf Zama Ye	Sitara Younas
2014	De Ta Zhwand Wayee	Raheem Shah and Shahzad Adeel
2014	Tuba	Gulzar Hairan
2014	Spogmai Raghla	Ali Etemadi
2014	Yara Sta Pa Aanago Ke	Nazia Iqbal
2013	Rafta	Shafiq Soroush
2013	Nasihat	Bashir Maidani
2013	Qarara Rasha	Raheem Shah
2013	Dalta Qadam Keda	Janas Khan
2013	Khedmatgar	Ustad Yar Mohammad
2013	Mata Cha Way Kawa Mina	Sharon Osser
2013	Bewafa	Sangar Suhail
2013	Khlak Rata Wae Duniya Khoali Da	Shah Sawar
2013	Yarane Ma Jorawe	Dil Raj
2013	Khudkasha Dhamaka Yama	Sitara Younas
2013	Ashuqana	Jamshid Sakhi
2013	Dar Vasl	Abdul Hai Wafa
2013	Bewafa	Shafiq Mureed
2013	Raban	Shafiq Mureed
2013	Pama Nazona	Izzat Gul
2013	Turk Shairazi	Mirwais Nejrabi
012	Tapoos	Bakhtiar Khattak
2012	Morey Morey	Goodar Zazai
2012	Zar Sha	Sharon Osser
2012	Larsha Pekhawar	Hamayun Khan
2012	Khaista Afghanistan	Zeek Afridi
2012	Mahbooba Yem	Gul Panra
2012	Baran Sung	Shafiq Mureed
2012	Zindigi	Shafiq Mureed
2012	Ye Akhri Gunah Kawom Toba Kolam	Fiza Fayaz
2012	Khanda Rata Kawi	Fiza Fayaz
2012	Da Khkulay Zama Dy	Sitara Younas
2011	Tor Orbal Ra Khor Ka Jor Da Bangro Shor Ka	Raheem Shah
2011	Ali Kana	Humayun Khan and Nazia Iqbal
2011	Subhe Eshq	Sangar Suhail
2011	Tor Orbal Ra Khor Ka Jor Da Bangro Shor Ka	Raheem Shah
2011	Khkola De Ajeeba	Wayan Honarjo
2011	Da Wafa Las Raka	Asma Lata
2011	Mashallah	Shahsawar and Asma Lata
2011	Subhe Eshq	Sangar Suhail
2010	Mahtab	Bashir Asim
2010	Malgaro Rata Wail Che Meena Ma Kawa	Khalid Malik
2010	Lewanay Kegam	Fiza Fayaz
2009	Morey	Hamayun Khan
2009	Mohabbat	Bashir Asim
2009	Tora Ghanamranga	Janas Khan
2009	Mala Chal Na Razi	Naghma
2009	Shrang Warka Bangro La	Raees Bacha
2008	Pekhawar Kho Pekhawar De Kana	Irfan Khan
2008	Toro Jamo Ki Da Nazara Nashe	Humayun Khan
2008	Dunya Me Sta Sanama	Nazia Iqbal
2008	Rasha Guli Rasha	Latif Nangarhari
2007	Laila Laila	Khalid Malik
2007	Name Rata Oval	Hamayoon Khan
2007	Tarali Kadi Mi Bya Pati Da Janan Ki	Khalid Malik
2005	Za Intezar Kawam	Zia Khattak
2005	Mung Yo Da Khyber Zalmi	Zeek Afridi
2005	Bibi Sherini	Zeek Afridi
