= Ali Khan =

Ali Khan may refer to:

== People ==
=== Entertainment ===
- Ali Khan (British actor) (born 2001)
- Ali Khan (food blogger), presenter of Cheap Eats
- Ali Khan (singer) (born 1990), Pakistani singer
- Ali Khan (Sufi) (1881–1958), musician and religious leader
- Ali Akbar Khan (1922–2009), Hindustani classical musician
- Ali Baba Khan (born 1993), Pakistani singer
- Ali Rehman Khan (born 1982), Pakistani actor
- Ghulam Ali Khan (1902–1968), Indian painter
- Saif Ali Khan (born 1970), Indian actor

=== Military and politics ===
- Ali Khan (activist) (fl. 2003–2006), Pakistani political activist
- Ali Khan (brigadier) (fl. 1979), Pakistani army officer
- Ali Ahmad Khan (1883–1929), Afghan politician
- Ali Gohar Khan, Pakistani politician
- Ali Mardan Khan (died 1657), Kurdish military leader and administrator
- Ali Mohammed Khan (1706–1748), Rohilla chief in India
- Ali Muhammad Khan (born 1977), Pakistani politician
- Ali S. Khan, physician and former public health director at CDC

=== Sport ===
- Ali Khan (Pakistani cricketer) (born 1989), Pakistani first-class cricketer for Sialkot
- Ali Khan (American cricketer) (born 1990), American bowler of Pakistani origin
- Ali Khan (Sri Lankan cricketer) (born 1993), Sri Lankan cricketer for Chilaw Marians
- Ali Khan (footballer), Pakistani international footballer

== Places ==
- Ali Khan, Haripur, a union council in Pakistan
- Ali Khan, Sistan and Baluchestan, a village in Iran

== See also ==
- Alikhan, a given name and surname
- Prince Aly Khan (1911–1960), Pakistani socialite, racehorse owner and jockey, military officer, and diplomat
- Alyy Khan (born 1968), Pakistani-British actor
- Fateh Ali Khan (disambiguation)
- Ibrahim Ali Khan (disambiguation)
