= Amanullah Sailaab Sapi =

Afghan poet and writer

Amanullah Sailaab Sapi امان الله سېلاب ساپی
- Born: 1933; Kama District, Nangarhar, Afghanistan
- Died: 1979 (aged 45–46)
- Occupation: Government employee
- Known for: Poetry

Amanullah Sailaab Sapi (an alternative spelling for Safi) (Pashto: امان الله سېلاب ساپی/صافي, born 1933 - died 1979) was a renowned Afghan poet and writer.

== Early life and education ==
Amanullah was born in 1933 in Kama District of Nangarhar Province, Afghanistan to Nasrullah Khan Sapi. He obtained his primary education from a local school.

== Poetry and songs ==
Sailab Safi has written numerous Pashto poetries. Some of his poetry has been transformed to famous Pashto songs. Ustad Awalmir has sung numerous songs based on the poetry of Sailaab Sapi, of which the most notable is "Sta De Sterogo Bala Wakhlam" (Pashto: ستا دسترګو بلا واخلم).

During the presidency of Daoud Khan (1973–1978) his poetry won the best national award for excellency among both Pashto and Dari. These poems were dedicated for mother's day. His poetry has also been celebrated by singers such as Mirmon Rukhshana, Ustad Ayub, Ustad Nashenas, Ustad Khyal Muhammad, Ustad Shah Wali and many other famous Afghan singers. He has written many books including Da Marghalara-o-Amail and other.
