= Zarsanga =

Pakistani singer (born 1946)

Zarsanga PP
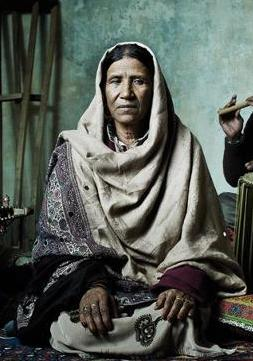
- Zarsanga in 2015
- Born: 1946 (age 79–80); Lakki Marwat, North-West Frontier Province, British India
- Other name: "The Queen of Pashto Folklore"
- Occupation: Singer
- Years active: 1955–present
Zarsanga
- Genre: Pashto folklore
- Labels: Long Distance; Coke Studio

Zarsanga PP (Pashto: زرڅانگه; born 1946) is a Pashtun singer from Khyber Pakhtunkhwa, primarily associated with Pashto folk music. She began her singing career singing for Radio Pakistan in Peshawar and for some television programmes and has performed extensively in Afghanistan. Later, she went on to perform in Europe, the United States, and the UAE. Her extensive career as a singer and performer has earned her the sobriquet "The Queen of Pashtun Folklore" and the Presidential Pride of Performance Award by the Government of Pakistan.

== Early life ==
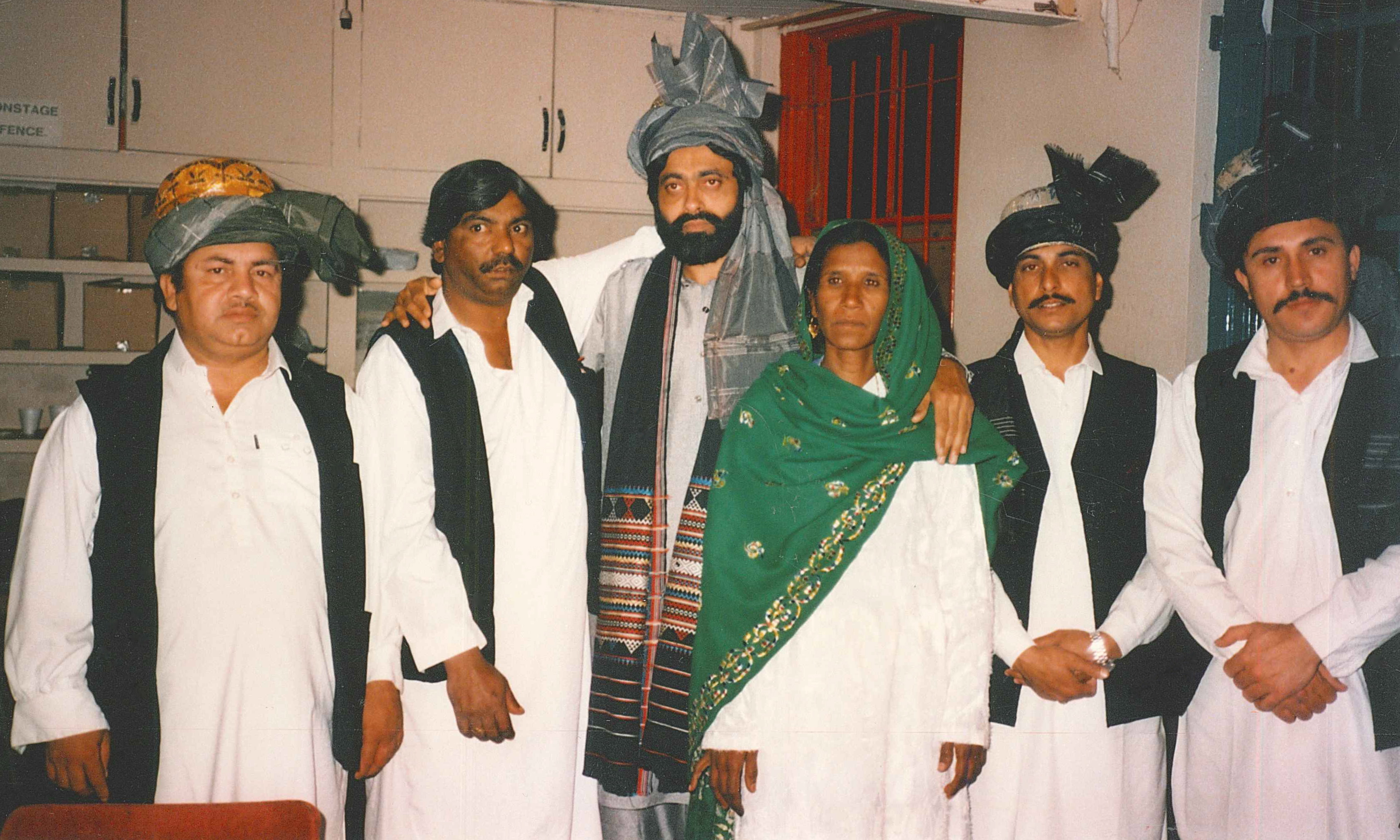
Zarsanga with their band in March 1991 at Hackney Empire in London

Zarsanga was born in 1946 in a small village of Zafar Mamakhel in Lakki Marwat, North-West Frontier Province, British India (now Pakistan). She was born into the nomadic Kutan tribe, who travel mostly within the Pashtun region covering the areas of Bannu Road from Dera Ismail Khan, Kohat and Peshawar. Singing is a major profession for the people of the tribe and Zarsanga took it up at a young age as well.

== Career ==
Zarsanga was discovered at a young age by a local musician, Mustafa during a performance at a wedding event. Mustafa introduced her to Rashid Ali Dehqan, a producer of Radio Peshawar who called her in for an audition. Zarsanga was signed by the broadcasting company and would go on to perform some of her best known songs on Radio Pakistan. At the start of her career, Zarsanga would listen to the songs of Gulnar Begum, Kishwar Sultan, Bacha Zarin Jan, Khyal Muhammad, Ahmad Khan and Sabz Ali Ustad.

I liked all of them, but I have maintained my own traditional way of folk singing. The people would earnestly enjoy my songs on both sides of the Durand Line (Pakistan-Afghan border). I got no education so I cannot sing from a written paper. Most often I sing the songs that are composed and created by the common folk. However, my husband also wrote some of my popular songs.

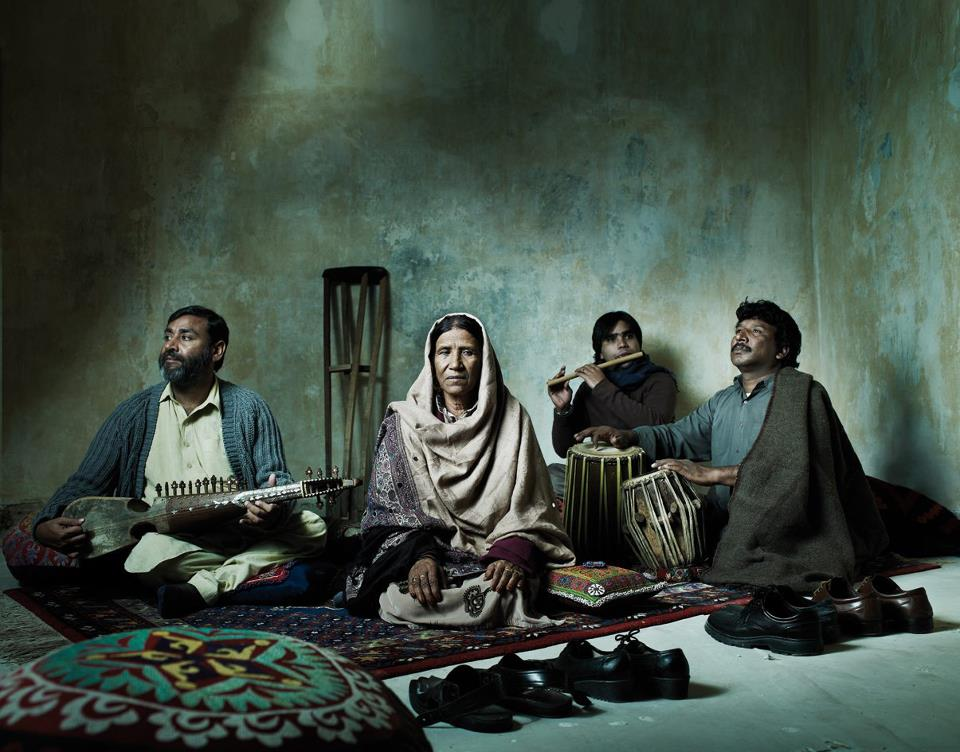
Zarsanga and her band in 2015

A French researcher, Miss Kia, who worked with Radio France, once said Zarsanga's voice was the only mountainous voice in the Pashto language. Kia accompanied Zarsanga to France for a music concert, which was well received at the time. Zarsanga talked about performing live for international audiences in one of her interviews. Recalling her experience at a live music event in London she said, "I was singing a traditional folk song in Pashto about the mountains and gypsy life of the tribals and when I finished it, a British person came close to me and proudly remarked that he was also a gypsy."

Over the course of an extensive career, spanning over five decades, Zarsanga has recorded and performed popular songs including "Da Bangriwal Pa Choli Ma Za", her only song on radio, "Zma Da Khro Jamo Yara", "Rasha Mama Zwi De", "Zma Da Ghrono Pana Yara", and "Kht Me Zanzeri De". She also continued to perform variously in international music tours in Germany, France, Belgium, Iraq, United Arab Emirates, United States, and United Kingdom.

In 2018, Zarsanga appeared in the promotional video for the eleventh season of Coke Studio Pakistan. She later recorded a song for the eight episode of the season, performing "Rasha Mama" alongside Pashto band Khumariyaan and Gul Panra. The video was released on Coke Studio Pakistan's official YouTube on 16 August and has seen been viewed by over 6.8 million viewers.

== Personal life ==
In 1965, Zarsganga married Malla Jan, a resident of Sarai Naurang, Lakki Marwat who was also a nomad. Many people believe she is married to popular folk singer Khan Tehsil, but she denies the rumors and to this day says Khan Tehsil is her husband's cousin:

Actually, I sang with him on many occasions and most of our joint songs got immense popularity. He is not my husband, he is just like my brother.

Zarsanga and Malla Jan have nine children including three daughters and six sons. Shahzada, Zarsanga's second-oldest son, is also a musician.

Zarsanga lives with her sons and two grandchildren in Nowshera district of Khyber Pakhtunkhwa. In July 2017, her house was burgled by a group of unidentified assailants, who robbed the household of most valuables.

== Discography ==
- Chants Du Pashtou (1993)

=== Singles ===
- "Da Bangriwal Pa Choli Ma Za"
- "Kht Me Zanzeri De"
- "Rasha Mama Zwi De"
- "Zma Da Ghrono Pana Yara"
- "Zma Da Khro Jamo Yara"

=== Coke Studio ===
- "Hum Dekhenge", performed with many artists.

=== Contributing artist ===
- The Rough Guide to the Music of India and Pakistan (1996, World Music Network)

== Awards and honours ==
For her contributions to the field music and folk singing, Zartsanga was awarded the Pride of Performance Award (Tamġa-ē Ḥusn-e Kārkardagī) by the Government of Pakistan. She has also been dubbed "The Queen Of Pashtun Folklore" by various media outlets. In 2000 at PTV Award she received Best Singer award.

== See also ==
- Pashto music
- Pashtun culture
- Music of Pakistan
