= Fazal Malik Akif =

Pakistani singer and songwriter

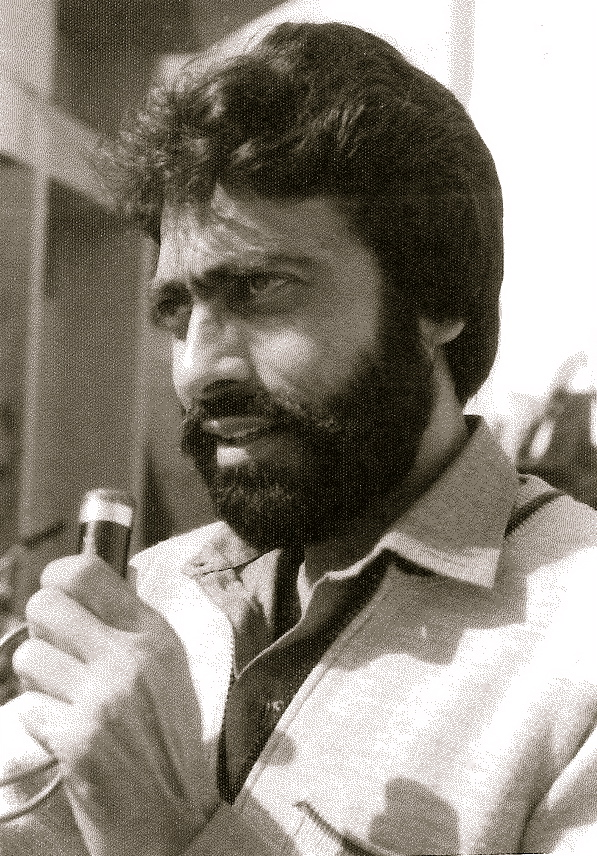
- Akif in 1984
- Born: 22 October 1947 (age 78); Kohat, Khyber Pakhtunkhwa, Pakistan
- Occupations: Singer, songwriter, poet, lawyer
- Years active: 1964–1994
- Spouse: Sirat Malik (1982–2004, her death)
- Children: Mohammad Ali Khan; Namsi Nāmūs Khan
- Website: Channel Akif

Signature
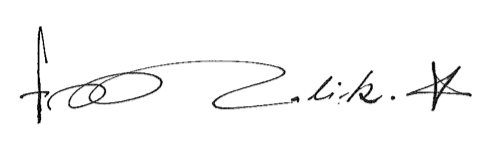

Fazal Malik Akif (Urdu: فضل مالك عاکف) (born 22 October 1947) is a Pakistani singer and songwriter, who gained popularity in the 1970s for introducing a modern and eclectic twist to traditional Pashto folk compositions. He is widely regarded as the first "pathan pop star" for collaborating indigenous instruments such as the rubab, harmonium and tabla with contemporary synthesizers, accordion, drums and electric guitar. He typically sang in his native language of Pashto, but his repertoire extends to Urdu, Punjabi, Hindko, Sindhi, Balochi, Saraiki and Persian.

Unlike other Pashtun performers of his time, Akif adopted an exuberant and expressive style on stage, which led to him being labelled a "game changer" of the Pashto music scene. Due to the romantic nature of his lyrics he was considered a heartthrob and built a large female following. His energetic engagement with audiences broke Pashtun music traditions and often caused mayhem and mass hysteria.

Recognised for his exceptionally deep voice, Akif has been credited for altering the face of conventional Pashto folk music. His musical influences include K.L. Saigal, Pankaj Mullick, Jagmohan, C.H. Atma and Mukesh.

Akif overcame resistance by traditionalists of his era and is amongst the most distinct artists to have risen from the Pashto music industry.

== Early life ==
Akif was born in Kohat, Pakistan in 1947. Born Fazal-e-Malik, he added the pen name "Akif" in 1971 when he came across the word in Islamic literature. Akif derives from the word "I'tikaf", loosely translated as "someone who cannot be moved". His father Fazal Karim Asif was a prominent lawyer and mother Zubaida Khanum was a housewife.

Akif is the third of seven siblings and describes himself as a "misfit" growing up. But he always maintained a close relationship with his father, a highly academic man and descendant of the Kamboh (Zubairi) tribe.

As a child, Akif was heavily influenced by his father's intellectual reputation and completed a law degree at Peshawar University to fulfill his father's wishes.

After completing his degree, Akif handed the certificate to his father and declared his intention to continue his music career. However, upon his father's strict insistence, Akif put his plans on hold and worked as a lawyer, notary public and oath commissioner for several years. Akif struggled with his conscience when taking on cases he did not believe in and often lost out on fees by referring clients to colleagues or competitor law firms.

Akif had a love marriage to one of his fans, Sirat Malik (died 2004) from Rawalpindi, Pakistan. Sirat, who did not speak nor understand Pashto, wrote to Akif after seeing him perform on television. While touring the Punjab region of Pakistan, Akif visited Sirat's workplace to surprise her. They fell in love, married and have two children, a son Mohammad Ali Khan and a daughter Namsi Nāmūs Khan.

== Career ==
=== Early work: 1964–1969 ===
Akif's first stage performance was at high school. Known to be an aloof, angry and introverted young man who kept himself to himself, Akif only agreed to perform on the insistence of his head-teacher who had identified Akif's talent for performing arts. Akif agreed to sing on the condition that he remained behind the stage curtains and did not have to face the audience.

Akif made his official singing debut in 1964 on Peshawar Radio Station on a programme titled, "University Magazine". By now, Akif had gained popularity for his confident delivery of several stage performances in college and was selected alongside other talented students for the radio show.

Soon Akif was being introduced to music producers across Peshawar and was offered opportunities to sing on live radio. His first live Pashto performance was on Peshawar Radio Station in 1965, which led to him receiving offers from producers from across the province. As Hindko was his first language, Akif taught himself to read Pashto and often, due to time constraints, learnt songs verbatim by listening to them repeatedly.

From 1964 to 1969 Akif performed regularly on Peshawar Radio Station and gained increasing popularity for re-inventing Ashraf Maftoon's songs with his own compositions.

=== Rise to stardom: 1970–1974 ===
Akif performed on television for the first time on the talent show "Naye Funkaar" in Rawalpindi, Pakistan in September 1969. The show invited contestants from East Pakistan, now Bangladesh, and Pakistan to showcase their musical, singing, dancing and drama abilities in front of a panel of judges. Akif, still determined to pursue his passion for acting, had prepared a drama sketch as his audition piece. However, due to encouragement from Agha Nasir, the General manager of the television channel, Akif was put forward to also sing.

Razia Sultana, a television producer and panel judge took Akif aside after his drama audition and encouraged him to sing in Pashto for the singing segment. Despite his apprehension he performed a rendition of the Pashto song "Turah Chay Tairaigy" and won first place in the competition.

It was around this time Akif won the interest of renowned Pathan poet Ahmed Faraz. The two men forged a close friendship and regularly spent evenings together discussing their poetry and lyrics.

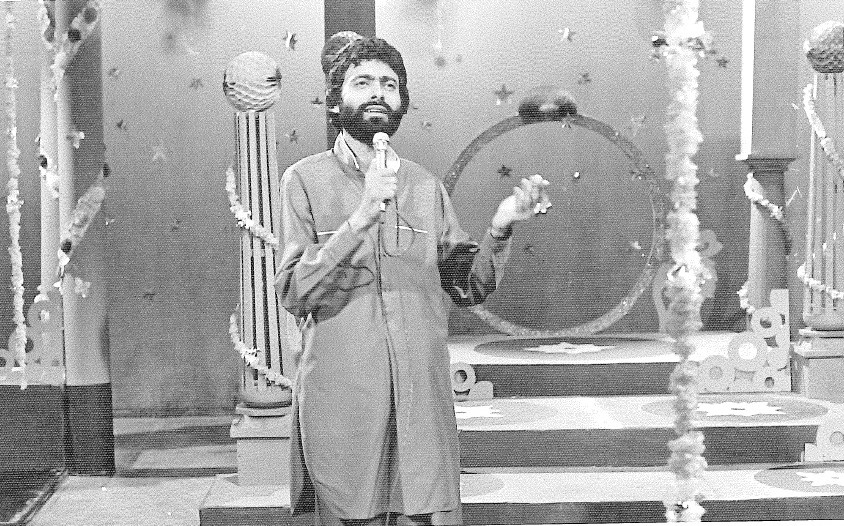
Akif performing on Pakistan television in the 1970s

In the years following, Akif went on to perform on various television shows including, "Aaghosh-e-Kohistan", loosely meaning "from the lap of the mountains", "Lok Tamasha", "Lok Mela", "Lok Virsa" and "Nandara".

In 1974, a 27-year-old Akif was invited by Chaklala Television to sing alongside Naheed Akhtar, Tahira Syed and Roshan Ara Begum, three senior figures of the music industry, for the show "Mehfil". However, Akif was vehemently against performing duets and perceived such requests to be insults to his artistic individuality.

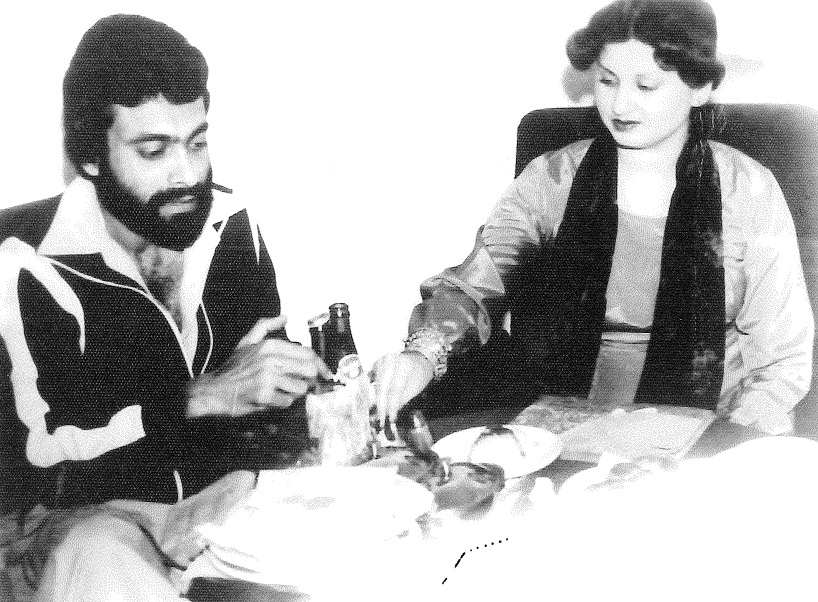
Fazal Malik Akif with Mahjabeen

On another occasion in 1988, at a patriotic concert organised for Pakistan government's chief guests and ministers at Liaquat Memorial Hall, Rawalpindi, Akif refused to sing in a group behind lead singer, Shaukat Ali.

Akif was regularly banned from television throughout his career for submitting scathing interviews to publications with complaints about the music industry's lack of creativity and unwillingness to experiment. Akif performed in various venues in Karachi, however, the opportunity to record an album never materialised.

Akif's distinctive singing style had started to garner interest in India. So profound was his impact that according to an article published in the Frontier Post, "Frontier's Voice with a touch of Saigal" by Afzal Hussain Bokhari, Akif was a favourite of Bollywood film actor Raj Kapoor. When Kapoor came across Akif's audio cassette he was so impressed he likened Akif's voice to that of his close friend Mukesh, and insisted Akif be invited to Bombay as a vocalist for his future films.

In the late 1980s, Akif twice toured the Middle East including Dubai, Abu Dhabi, Sharjah and Qatar, alongside actresses and dancers Parveen Babi, Sonia and Rukhsana, as well as actors Badar Munir and Asif Khan, to showcase his music to a wider audience.

=== Western recognition: 1990–1994 ===
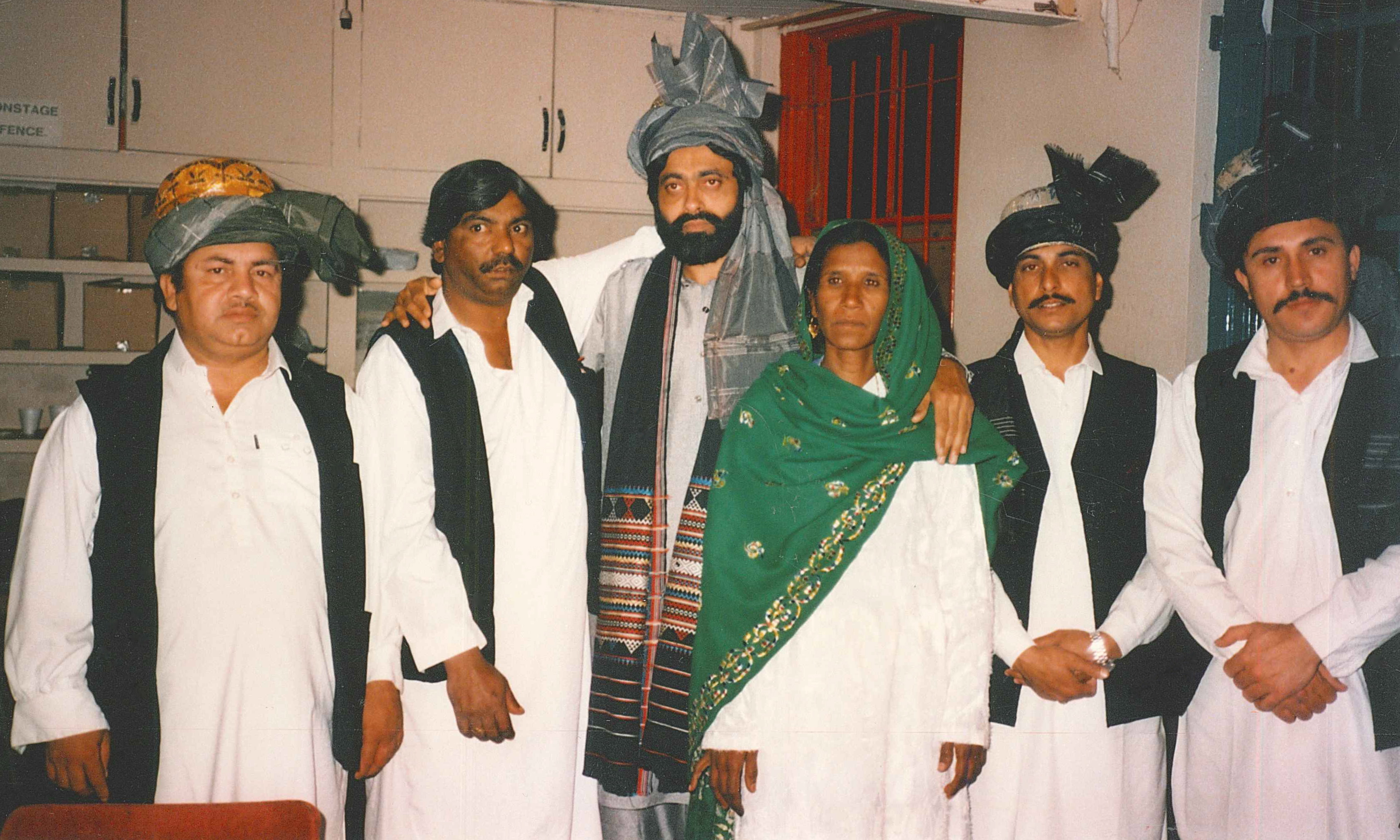
Fazal Malik Akif & Zarsanga with their band in March 1991 at Hackney Empire in London

During a trip to Peshawar in 1990, Anne Hunt of World Circuit Records, came across Akif at a show at Nishtar Hall, Peshawar. Anne Hunt and Mary Farquharson, of what was then Arts Worldwide, were in search of musicians who were popular locally but little known to the wider western public. Hunt was seeking artists that encompassed musical excellence in their respective genres, and saw in Akif a global star relevant for the western music market. Hunt organised for Akif and his band, Walidad on tabla, Aman Shah on dholak, Musafir on harmonium and Amir Hamza on rubab, to travel to the United Kingdom as part of the "Jashan-e-Bahar" festival from the 7–21 March 1991, alongside other artists including Abida Parveen, Aziz Mian, Zarsanga, Allan Fakir and Farida Khanum. On arrival in the United Kingdom in March 1991, Akif performed with his band in various cities including venues in Hackney and Greenwich in London, Manchester and Birmingham. He was interviewed on BBC radio and TV Asia, and went on to perform on Channel 4 for the series Mahfil.

Akif headlined along with Hangama and Farishta on 26 April 1992 for the Afghan Festival. He also regularly performed at charity concerts, including an event at Ganesh Hall, London in support of the Guyana Care centre.

In April 1994, Akif was invited as the honorary guest to the launch of Safeer magazine. The event took place at Sanam restaurant in Manchester and was hosted by the magazine's chief editor, Mohammad Azhar. A review of Akif's future Eid show performance went on to feature in the magazine.

On 22 October 1994, his 47th birthday, Akif headlined at the Gracie Fields Theatre in Rochdale, Lancashire as part of the North West Asian Talents Promotion event. This is believed to be one of Akif's final live performances.

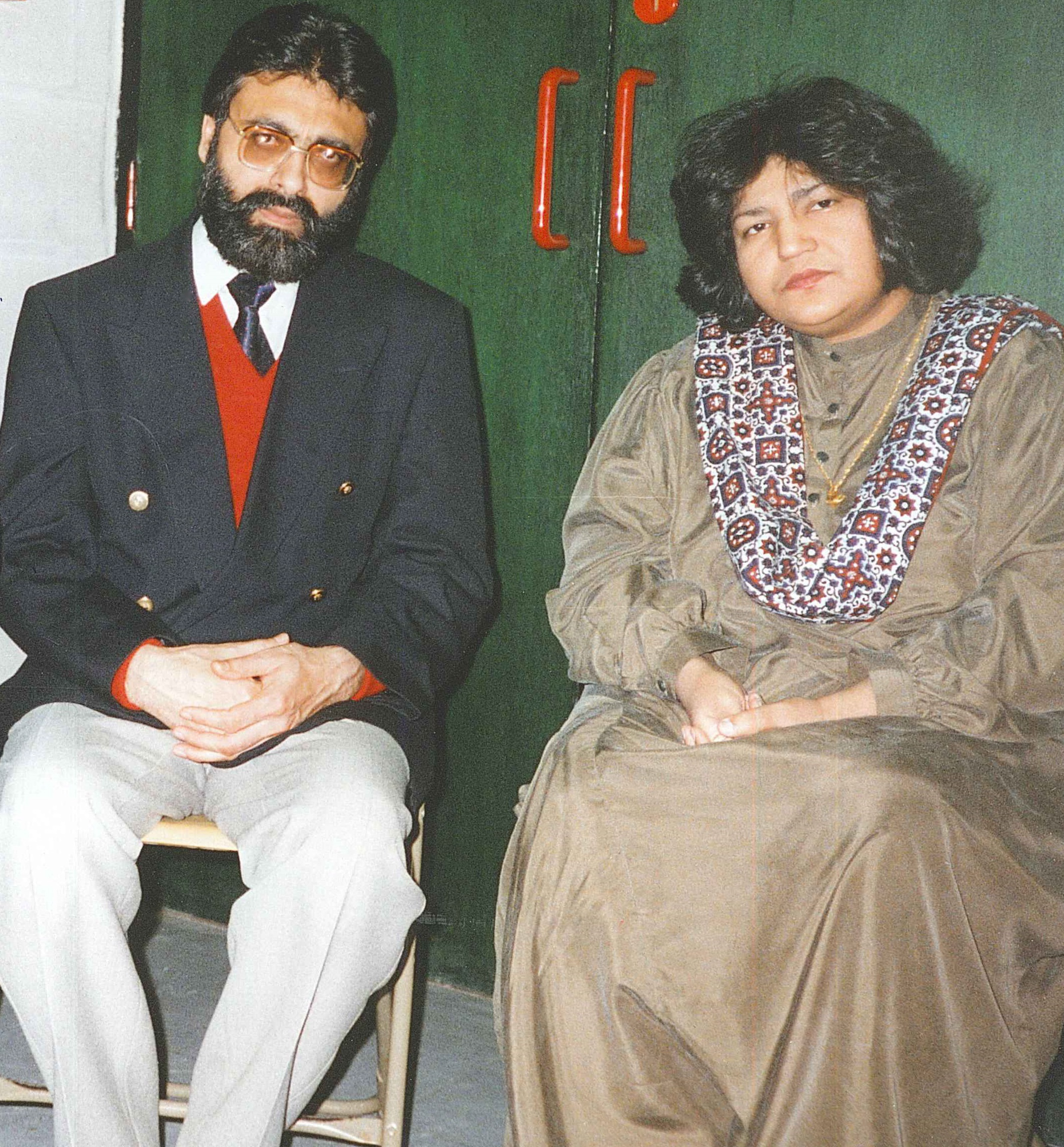
Akif & Abida Parveen in Manchester on 4 December 1994

== Awards and nominations ==
Akif was first nominated for the Pakistan Television Awards in 1986 in the category of "Outstanding Performance". He went on to win the 1987–1988 Khyber Award for "Best Singer" at a ceremony in Nishtar Hall, Peshawar. He was also nominated in three separate years for Pakistan Television's National Music Awards in the category of "Best Singer", once losing out to Abida Parveen.

In 1987, Akif competed at "Lok Mela" in Islamabad, coming second to Pakistani gypsy folk singer Zarsanga. In the weeks ensuing Akif initiated legal action against "Lok Mela" for vote rigging. In response, Adam Nayyar, executive director of "Lok Virsa" replied acknowledging that Akif was indeed the best performer in terms of stage performance, public popularity and singing. Nayyar went on to invite Akif to sit on the UNESCO Advisory Board as a cultural ambassador, a position Akif declined out of principle.

The Ministry of Culture of North-West Frontier Province recommended Akif for the "Pride of Performance" award for three consecutive years from 1988 to 1991.

== Discography ==
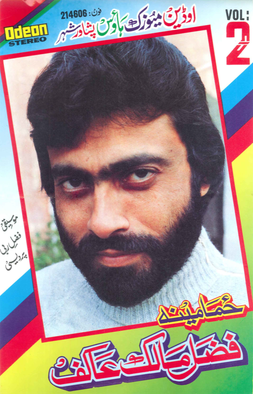
Fazal Malik Akif's "Zama Meena" cassette cover

Akif sang hundreds of songs throughout his career and released some of his tracks on vinyl, as well as releasing EP's through EMI Pakistan Ltd. Recording Company in Pashto and Sindhi.

- Zama Meena
- Baraan Wai Baraan
