= Hidayatullah (singer) =

Pashto folk musician and playback singer (1940–2019)

- Ustad Hidayatullah

Background information
- Born: 1940; Dag Besood, Nowshera, Khyber Pakhtunkhwa
- Origin: Khyber Pakhtunkhwa
- Died: 28 September 2019 (aged 78–79) Peshawar, Pakistan
- Occupations: Folk singer; Playback singer
- Years active: 1970–2014
- Resting place: Dag Behsud Pabbi
- Other names: Ustad Hidayatullah
- Awards: Pride of Performance

Hidayatullah (1940 – 28 September 2019; sometimes spelled Hidayat Ullah, also known by honorific title Ustad Hidayatullah), was a Pakistani Pashto folk musician, playback singer and touring artist who primarily sung multilingual songs in numerous regional languages such as Pashto, Urdu, Hindko, Punjabi, and in Persian language. His live concerts include Europe, U.S., UAE and in 1969 or earlier, he was invited by an Afghan king Mohammed Zahir Shah to Kabul as a state guest and named him "Mohammed Rafi of Pashto".

== Life and background ==
Hidayatullah was born in 1940 at Dag Besood, Nowshera, Khyber Pakhtunkhwa. Before his initial schooling, his family moved to Peshawar where he attended Edwardes High school (now Edwardes College Peshawar) and did his matriculation. In 1960, he joined a state government agency and served in agriculture department until he retired from the service as a senior clerk in year 2000.

== Career ==
After completing his matriculation, Hidayatullah was engaged in attending a weekly darbar of Mehfil-i-Sama where one of his spiritual teachers asked him to sing a Sufi song. After participating in concert of classical music, his made singing Qawwalis his daily routine. He learnt music from Abdul Karim (Andaleeb Ustad) and Khalid Malak, and later in 1963 he joined Radio Peshawar where he was introduced to other artists such as Khyal Muhammad, Kishwar Sultan, Gulab Sher, Gulnar Begum and Kishwar Sultan. His Pashto song "Der Karredealay Yema" was aired from Peshawar Radio station. Hidayatullah originally started his singing career with a first-ever Pashto film Yousuf Khan Sher Bano during 1970s. Later, he sung songs for other films in Hindko and Punjabi languages. His prominent songs include "Yama Da Truck Driver" for Urbal and Nishta De Manzil Zama film. His prominent Hindko language song "Qissakhwani de Wechkaar" was released in 1980. His songs include "Rasha Auo Rasha", "Tere Shwey Warze Da Khanda", and "Manzal Da Tolo Uew De Kho Safar Juda Juda". As a singer, Hidayatulla predominantly worked for Pashto films such as Deedan, Ghazi Kaka, Orbal, Jawargar, Alaqa Ghair, and Da Pakhtun Tora. He became the recipient of the Pride of Performance and two Living Human Treasures in recognition of his contributions to Pashto music.

== Death ==
During his last days, he passed his life under extremely unstable events as he had not gained much popularity until his last songs were released, leading him to earn national recognition. It is believed he lived his life in oblivion from 2004 to 2019, as he had several not-known personal issues due to amnesia and other health ailments. Hidayatullah died at his residence Kakshaal Qadeem on 28 September 2019 in Peshawar. He is buried in Dag Behsud Pabbi village of Nowshera district.
