= Mashooq Sultan =

Pakistani folk singer

- Sultana Bibi a.k.a. Mashooq Sultan

Background information
- Also known as: Melody Queen of the Pashto folk music Queen of the stage Mashooq Sultan
- Born: Sultana Bibi; 1952; Swat State, Pakistan
- Origin: Swat
- Died: 19 December 2016 (aged 63–64) Peshawar, Pakistan
- Genres: Ghazals, Folk
- Occupations: Singer; Actress
- Years active: 1962 – 2016
- Labels
- Awards: Pride of Performance; Tamgha-e-Imtiaz

Mashooq Sultan (born Sultana Bibi; 1952 – 19 December 2016) was a Pakistani folk singer and former actress. The recipient of numerous accolades, including the highest national literary award of Pakistan, the Pride of Performance, she is sometimes referred to as "Melody Queen of the Pashto folk music" for her contributions to Pashto music and "Queen of the stage" for representing Pakistan in numerous countries, including the US, the UK, France, Belgium, the UAE and Afghanistan. As a multilingual singer, she worked on 1,500 albums recorded in carious regional languages such as Urdu, Punjabi, Saraiki and primarily Pashto. She also sang ghazals, and was a playback singer in Pashto films.

== Early life ==
She was born in Swat District's Chur Pinawrai town north of Shah Dehrai in Khyber Pakhtunkhwa. When she was a child, her family shifted from Shah Dehrai to Mardan. She was married to Walayat Husain at twelve, with whom she had two daughters and four sons.

== Career ==
When Mashooq was a teen (around sixteen), she first started singing as a wedding singer while performing during wedding ceremonies, and debuted in singing profession in 1962 when a Pakistani radio producer, Nawab Ali Khan Yousafzai introduced her to Radio Pakistan, the national public broadcaster of the country, at Peshawar station. Besides radio, she was also associated with Pakistan Television Corporation. Prior to singing, she worked in Pashto films such as Jawargar, Janaan, including her first film Darra Khaibar and later chose to pursue singing.

She received singing training from one of her neighbors who was affiliated with music, and later Nawab Ali Yousafzai took her audition. After auditioning, she sang a duet musical composition with Gulab Sher in a children’s programme, designed for preschoolers. Later she performed in Rafiq Shinwari's folk song titled "Da pah deryab ke sailaboono." (I am drowned in a stream of your worries) by Fazal Ghani Mujahid which was recorded at Radio Pakistan.

== Personal life ==
During her last days, she experienced difficult circumstances due to poverty and lived in a two-room rented house at Chughalpura, Peshawar. In pursuit of better career opportunities in singing, she had moved to Peshawar around ten years ago, and subsequently fractured a leg, having to sell her jewellery for treatment. It is believed she chose folk singing over playback singing due to the militancy that affected art and music in Khyber Pakhtunkhwa and in one of its administrative units Swat Valley.

In 2008, she stated that the provincial government had discontinued paying her a monthly stipend of Rs. 2,500 (approx. $40) she had received since the Pride of Performance was conferred on her.

== Awards and accolades ==
She was the recipient of sixty medals. In 1996, she was awarded the Presidential Pride of Performance in recognition of her contribution to Pashto music. In 2010, the Chief Minister of Khyber Pakhtunkhwa, Ameer Haider Khan Hoti presented Rs.3,00,000 to Mashooq for her service to Pashto music. In 2015, the Governor of Khyber Pakhtunkhwa, Mehtab Abbasi presented Rs. 500,000 to her in recognition of her contributions to traditional music of Pashto. She was also the recipient of Tamgha-e-Imtiaz award.

== Death ==
She was suffering from health complications and died in Peshawar on 19 December 2016 of multiple ailments such as hepatitis and diabetes.
