= Alikhan =

- Language: Russian: Алихан; Kazakh: Әлихан; Azerbaijani: Əlixan; Urdu: علی خان

Other names
- Alternative spelling: Alihan, Elihan

Alikhan, also romanised as Alihan or Elihan, is a masculine given name among traditionally Muslim ethnicities in the former Soviet Union, and a surname found in Pakistan and India. It is derived the name Ali and the suffix Khan.

People with this given name include:

- Alikhan Bukeikhanov (1866–1937), Kazakh statesman
- Elihan Tore (1884–1976), president of the Second East Turkestan Republic
- Alihan Samedov (born 1964), Azerbaijani traditional musician
- Alikhan Ramazanov (born 1976), Russian football defender and midfielder (Russian Premier League)
- Alikhan Shavayev (born 1993), Russian football midfielder (Russian Premier League)

People with this surname include:

- Rehan Alikhan (born 1962), English cricketer of Pakistani descent
- Loren AliKhan (born 1983), American jurist

== See also ==
- Ali Khan (disambiguation)
