= Ibrahim Khan =

Ibrahim Khan may refer to:

- Ibrahim Khan Lodi, Sultan of Delhi from 1517 to 1526
- Ibrahim Khan II (reigned 1689–1697), the last Subahdar of Bengal during the reign of emperor Aurangzeb
- Ibrahim Khan Gardi (died 1761), Dakhani Muslim general in the 18th century India
- Ibrahim Khan Fath-i-Jang (reigned 1617–1624), Subahdar of Bengal during the reign of emperor Jahangir
- Ibrahim Khan (writer) (c. 1894–1978), Bangladeshi politician and academic
- Ibrahim Khan (Indian cricketer) (1911–1977), Indian cricketer
- Ibrahim Khan (Pakistani cricketer) (born 1964), Pakistani cricketer
- Ibrahim Khan (politician), Pakistani politician
- Muhammad Ibrahim Khan (politician) (1915–2003), Azad Kashmir politician
- Obby Khan (born 1980), former Canadian football centre
- Ibrahim Ali Khan (disambiguation)
- Ibrahim Khalil Khan (1730–1806), Azeri Turkic khan of Karabakh
