= Faisal Saleem Rahman =

Pakistani politician

Member of the Senate of Pakistan
- Incumbent
- Assumed office March 2021
- Constituency: Khyber Pakhtunkhwa

Personal details
- Party: PTI (2021-present)

Faisal Saleem Rahman (Pashto: فیصل سلیم رحمان) is a Pakistani politician who is currently serving as a member of the Senate of Pakistan from the Khyber Pakhtunkhwa since March 2021. He belongs to Pakistan Tehreek-e-Insaf. Rahman hails from Par Hoti, Mardan District.
