= Bacha Zareen =

Pakistani singer, lyricist, musician

- Also known as: Bibi Gul, Queen of Pashto Gazals
- Born: Bacha Zareen Jan c. 1942; Kalpanay, Par Hoti, Mardan, Khyber Pakhtunkhwa
- Origin: Khyber Pakhtunkhwa
- Died: 26 July 2012 Peshawar, Pakistan
- Genres: Ghazal; Classical; Devotional; Folk
- Occupations: Singer; Lyricist; Musician
- Years active: 1948–unknown
- Awards: Pride of Performance; Tamgha-e-Imtiaz

Bacha Zareen Jan (c. 1942 – 26 July 2012; sometimes spelled Bacha Zarin), known by her pen name Bibi Gul, also by the honorary title "Queen of Pashto Ghazals", (Note: Also known as Badshah Zarin Jan, or Badshan Zareen Jan) was a Pashto multilingual Pakistani gazal singer, lyricist and musician who primarily sung songs in different languages such as Persian, Hindko, Punjabi, Seraiki, Urdu and predominantly in Pashto language.

She debuted in music industry with a song titled "Gila Da Khpalo Keegi" (Note: translates to "complaints are made to the ones you know, not to strangers") at Radio Pakistan in 1948. Her next songs were "Za Pana Walarha", "Rao Ra Bandai", "Halaka Balai Ma Narhawa" and a sufi devotional song titled "Allah Ho Sha".

== Life and background ==
Zareen was born in 1942 at Kalpanay, Par Hoti, Mardan of Khyber Pakhtunkhwa. She belonged to musician family. Before she was born, her family was originally belonged to Calcutta (now Kolkata), India, later they moved to Peshawar, Pakistan following the partition of India. Her father, Ustad Abdur Rahim Khan was a musician who taught her basics of music. It is also believed that she never saw her father. She learnt Pashto music and ghazal singing from Pashto artists such as Gul Pazir Khan and Ghulam Fareed Khan. During her childhood, she used to sung songs that became prominent ones in her native area and in Federally Administered Tribal Areas (FATA).

== Career ==
Zareen started her singing career in 1948 with a Radio station at the age of seven where she used to sang songs in regional languages such as Pashto, Punjabi, Hindko, Urdu, Seraiki, and Persian. Later, her elder sister played a significant role teaching her singing. She also contributed her voice to All India Radio's musical programs. For sometime, Zareen was also involved in singing patriotic songs associated with Indo-Pakistani War of 1965. During her lifetime career, she later participated in a mehfil called Mehfil-e-Samaa and used to sung Sufi devotional songs where she was recognized as a "spiritual daughter" of a Pashto composer Rafiq Shinwari. Before her musical journey was started, her father Ustad Abdur Rahim Khan, a tabla player introduced her to the Pakistan Broadcasting Corporation (PBC) for an audition. During the early 1950s to the late 1970s, she was the only multilingual Pashtun singer, performing live concerts and became a prominent classical ghazal, and folk singer of Pakistan, primarily in Khyber Pakhtunkhwa. She wrote more than 200 songs in Urdu and Pashto language under pen-name Bibi Gul. During the Indo-Pakistani War of 1971, she sung patriotic songs in favor of the nation for which the president and military dictator Ayub Khan gave her sword and pistol in recognition of her contribution to the nation.

Zareen's prominent songs include "Alaka Bali Ma Narawa", "Ma Pre Sezi Ze", "Da Bama Olwegy Che Za", "Jenaki Daly Daly", "Tambal Wahi", and numerous other songs, leading her to earn national recognition. On 23 March 2000, the Government of Pakistan awarded her Tamgha-e-Imtiaz and earlier presidential Pride of Performance for her contribution to Pashto music that covers classical music of Afghanistan, Pashtun diaspora, Khyber Pakhtunkhwa, Balochistan and FATA provinces.

== Personal life ==
Zareen was born to Ustad Abdul Rahim Khan. She had six sisters, including her elder sister Dilbar Jan Balalily who taught her music. Due to social issues and cultural conflict (glass ceiling) in Mardan, she moved to Peshawar. After seeing her little sister was facing domestic violence or the atrocities of her husband, she spent her entire life without a marital relationship, fearing she would face the same.

She spent her last days in extremely difficult situations due to poverty and deteriorating health. It is believed Zareen and her nephew lived in a rented house in Peshawar, and later requested the provincial government-led cultural department of the Government of Khyber Pakhtunkhwa for financial assistance. The cultural department provided her a monthly fund of PKR2,500 that was later discontinued by the government. In 2008, state cultural minister Syed Aqil Shah came to her home and gave her PKR3,000. After the minister's visit was published by the news media, it is believed her home appeared crowded by the mortgage lenders demanded a recovery of their loans borrowed by Zareen.

== Death ==
She was suffering from multiple health ailments, she was subsequently admitted to medical institutions for treatment. On 26 July 2012, she died of kidney failure in Peshawar city.
