= Obaidullah Jan Kandahari =

Afghan singer

Obaidullah Jan Kandahari عبيدالله جان کندهاري
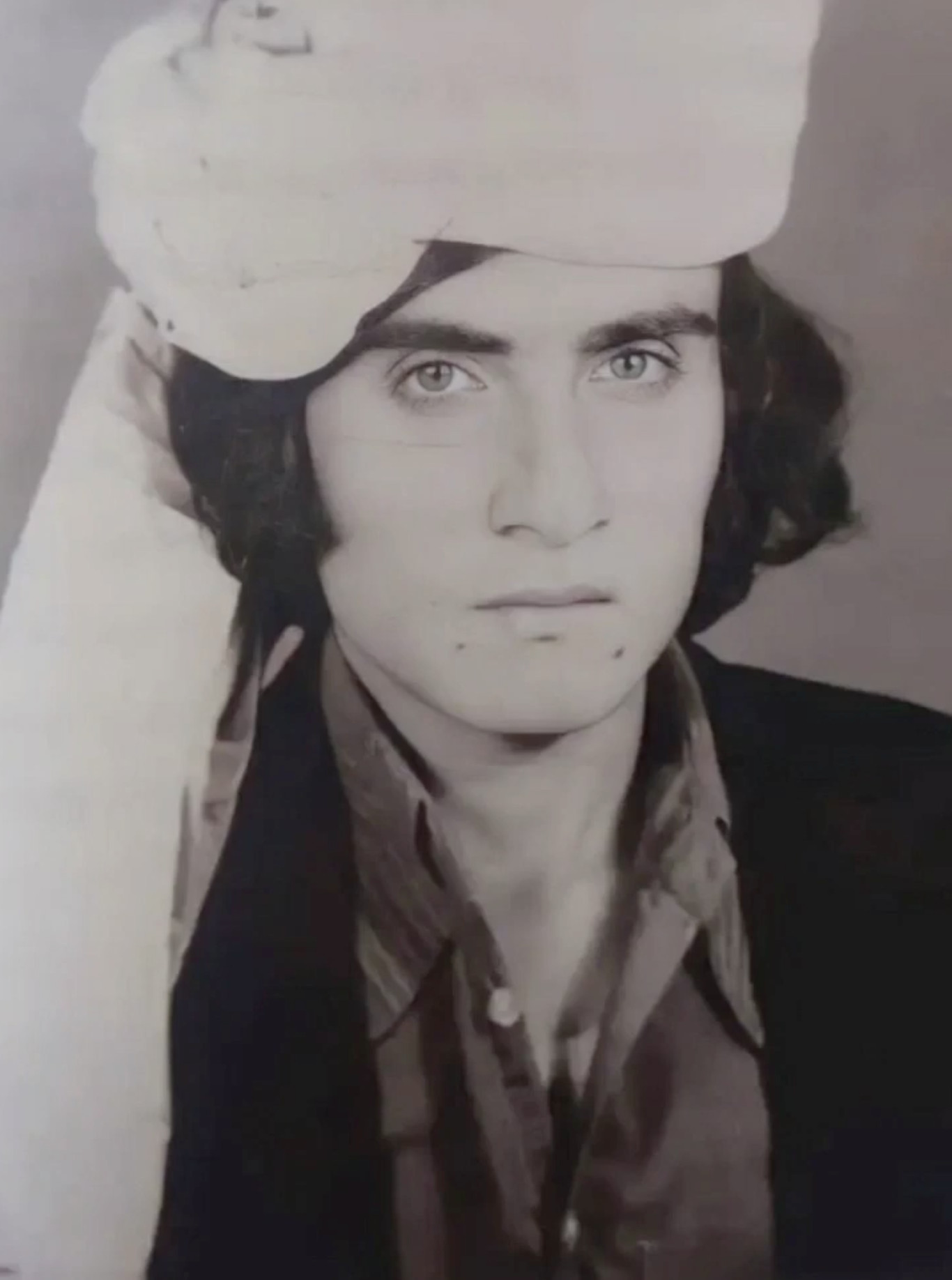
- Obaidullah Jan Kandahari in the 1970s.

Background information
- Born: Obaidullah Jan; 5 May 1951; Kandahar, Kingdom of Afghanistan
- Died: 25 February 1983 (aged 31) Spin Boldak, Democratic Republic of Afghanistan
- Genres: Ghazals, Classical
- Occupation: Afghan musician
- Instruments: Dhol, Dilruba, Tabla, Harmonium
- Years active: 1970s and early 1980s
- Labels: Aryan Records; Afghan Music Classics
- Past members: Abdul Baqi Dilresh, Abdul Khaliq Agha – (Pashto Poets)

Obaidullah Jan Kandahari, or simply known as Obaidullah Jan, was an Afghan singer from Kandahar. He was popular among the Pashtuns in southern Afghanistan and in Quetta, Pakistan. As a classical singer, Kandahari reformed traditional Pashto music. He recorded many albums with lyrics written by Sayed Abdul Khaliq Agha and Abdul Baqi Dilresh, famous Pashto poets from Kandahar.

== Composers ==
Abdul Baqi Dilresh, renowned by his poetic pseudonym "Dilresh," is a famous Pashto poet hailing from Kandahar, who was widely recognized for his contributions to Pashto literature. Notably, Obaidullah Jan Kandahari produced around 400 songs written by Abdul Baqi Dilresh, and the acclaimed artists Nazia Iqbal & Naghma have interpreted a few of Dilresh's compositions, though these remain unpublished on the internet, reserved as personal expressions.

== Death ==
During the Soviet-backed Democratic Republic of Afghanistan, Obaidullah Jan was secretly crossing the Durand Line into Pakistan with two females when he was murdered by General Ismatullah Muslim. It is believed that Obaidullah Jan was about 32 years old at the time of death, and that the assassination was over proceeds relating to his music. He was buried by Ismatullah's followers at an unknown place, but likely somewhere in the Spin Boldak District of Kandahar Province.

== See also ==
- List of Afghan singers
- List of Pashto-language singers
