= Fateh Ali Khan =

Fateh Ali Khan may refer to:

- Bade Fateh Ali Khan (1935–2017), Khyal vocalist
- Fateh Ali Khan (Qawwali singer) (1901–1964)
- Nusrat Fateh Ali Khan (1948–1997), Pakistani vocalist and musician
- Rahat Fateh Ali Khan (born 1973), Pakistani musician
- Tipu Sultan also Fateh Ali Khan Tipu, 18th-century ruler of Mysore from in southern India

== See also ==
- Ali Khan (disambiguation)
