= Chants Du Pashtou =

Studio album by Zarsanga
- Released: 1 June 1993
- Recorded: 1993
- Studios: Bidi Studio, Paris, France
- Genres: alternative; indie rock
- Length: 53:05
- Label: Long Distance

Chants Du Pashtou, (transl. Songs of the Pashtu, Pashto: زرسانګه) is the alternative-indie and debut solo studio album by Pashtun singer Zarsanga. The album was released on June 1, 1993 by Long Distance in Afghanistan.

== Production and recording ==
The tracks used for the album were recorded at Bidi Studio, in Paris, France.

== Track listing ==
Professional ratings
Review scores
Source	Rating
AllMusic	3/5 stars

All music composed by Zarsanga and lyrics are collected.

Track listing
No.	Title	Length
1.	"Ro Ro Keda"	7:44
2.	"Gula Sta de Kilie"	4:23
3.	"Naghma Giit"	3:04
4.	"Mata de Khaiber Lara"	5:24
5.	"Bane Mé Dargué Dargué"	6:17
6.	"Awami Giit"	6:44
7.	"Tappa"	4:42
8.	"Ze Darna Dubai La Zama"	4:07
9.	"Alap Rag Behro"	4:52
10.	"Zamung Watan Ké Baharuna"	5:55
Total length:		53:05
