= Ibrahim Ali Khan (disambiguation) =

Ibrahim Ali Khan may refer to:

- Ibrahim Ali Khan, Nawab of the Indian princely state of Tonk
- Ibrahim Ali Khan (actor) (born 2001), Indian actor, son of actor Saif Ali Khan

== See also ==
- Ibrahim Khan (disambiguation)
- Ali Khan (disambiguation)
