= Lok Virsa Museum =

Museum in Islamabad, Pakistan

Lok Virsa
- لوک ورثہ
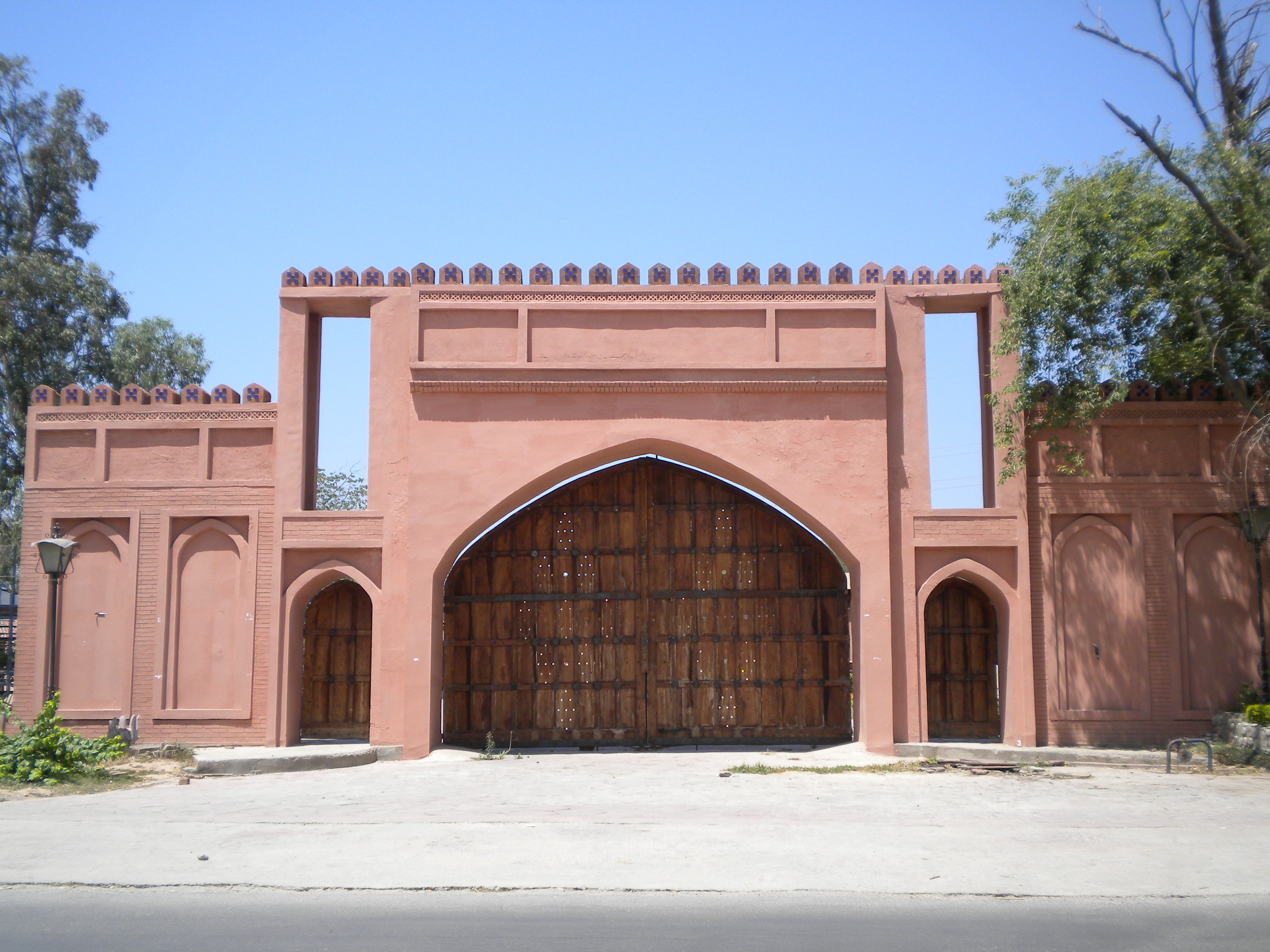
- Entrance to Lok Virsa's Heritage Museum
- Established: 1982
- Location: Garden Ave, Shakarparian, PO 1184, Islamabad, ICT, Pakistan. 44000
- Coordinates: 33.6887°N 73.0725°E
- Type: Cultural institute, Museum, Ethnology museum
- Directors: Former Director of Research Adam Nayyar (1948–2008) (Anthropologist, Author and Ethnomusicologist); Adam Nayyar served the Lok Virsa (Folk Heritage) for 20 years as a Director of Research.
- Website: lokvirsa.org.pk

Heritage Museum (Urdu: لوک ورثہ عجائب گھر), also known as Lok Virsa Museum, is a museum of history and culture located in the Shakarparian Hills of Islamabad, Pakistan. It is administered by the National Institute of Folk & Traditional Heritage.

The museum opened in 1974 and became an autonomous institute in 2002 following the Lok Virsa Legal Status Ordinance, 2002.

The museum consists of several buildings as well as an outdoor museum which can accommodate up to 3000 visitors showcasing the living cultures of Pakistan.

== Features ==
The museum covers an area of 5,570 m^{2} (60,000 sq ft) featuring several exhibit halls, making it the largest museum in Pakistan. Lok Virsa is commonly called the "Museum for the people of Pakistan", who the museum calls "the real bearers of our cultural traditions".

=== Pakistan National Museum of Ethnology ===
The Pakistan National Museum of Ethnology (or Folk Heritage Museum) was originally established in 1982 as the "Folk Art Museum". The museum showcases Pakistan's multicultural society by displaying history and living traditions of the various ethnic groups of Pakistan from all corners of the country. The museum covers an area of 1,860 m^{2} (20,000 sq ft), and in 2004, underwent renovations and was renamed. The museum is open from 10:00 to 19:00 from Sunday to Thursday and Saturday. On Friday, the museum closes for one hour between 13:00 to 14:00. The museum is closed on Mondays.

It displays the cultural heritage of Pakistani people. The living style of the different areas of Pakistan is exhibited here in statues, pictures, pottery, music and textile work. Lok Virsa is the finest cultural museum in Pakistan. It showcases art works that help in preserving the living folk and traditional culture and crafts of Pakistan. It is located near Shakarparian Hills and has a large display of embroidered costumes, jewellery, woodwork, metalwork, block printing, ivory and bone work. Traditional architecture facades exhibiting such skills as fresco, mirror work and marble inlay; tile, mosaic and stucco tracery are also displayed. Adjacent to the Lok Virsa Museum, the Lok Virsa Heritage Reference Library is well equipped with resource data on ethnography, anthropology, folk music, art, history and crafts. Books on culture, heritage, audio and video-cassettes of folk and classical vocal and instrumental music are available for sale at Lok Virsa's sales centre.

=== Sufis and Shrines Hall ===
In 2013, a Sufis and Shrines Hall was established within the Pakistan National Museum of Ethnology, popularly known as the Heritage Museum.

In this hall, there are pictures of musicians standing in performing postures singing poetry of sufi saints like Lal Shahbaz Qalandar, Shah Abdul Latif Bhittai and Sachal Sarmast. Also on display are pictures of shrines of Data Ganj Bakhsh, Shah Rukne Alam, and Bahauddin Zakariya.

Lok Virsa has also published a series of books on sufi saints like Bulleh Shah, Sultan Bahu, Waris Shah, and Mian Muhammad Bakhsh.

=== Pakistan Monument Museum ===
The Pakistan Monument Museum was established in 2010 to pay tribute to all those who worked and sacrificed everything for the Independence of Pakistan. The museum depicts ancient civilizations, the freedom struggle of Pakistan, the birth of Pakistan and major achievements of the country. It also facilities a reference library, audio-visual archive, conference hall along with a sixty-two seat capacity auditorium known as Panorama Hall.

=== Lok Virsa Library ===
The Lok Virsa Library (or Heritage Library) consists of over 32,000 books, journals, manuscripts and field reports pertaining to Pakistani folklore, ethnology, cultural anthropology, art history and craft as well as over 200 books published by Lok Virsa. The library is devoted to serve students, researchers and scholars in connection with their research work on cultural heritage of Pakistan, as well as the general public. The library provides valuable intangible benefits as a source of national, regional, and local identity. Numerous manuscripts, original research reports, field surveys and monographs on Pakistani culture are accessible to the public.

=== Virsa Research & Publication Centre ===
The Virsa Research & Publication Centre conducts field surveys particularly in the rural regions to record oral traditions. Lok Virsa has the mandate to document traditional heritage at the regional, district and sub-district level. Since the institute has currently no branches in other regions, a network of writers, scholars, universities, colleges and schools has been involved to carry out the task at the regional level. Towards this end, Lok Virsa commissions research projects and papers on significant aspects of our culture to students from different universities and colleges and also funds independent research studies. It conducts and commissions research in all sub-fields of folk and traditional heritage such as folk songs, folktales, games and celebrations. It publishes books on various facets of Pakistani folklore and cultural heritage covering all provinces and regions of Pakistan. The findings are later compiled in reports and then published in books, which are later sold by Lok Virsa and freely available at the Lok Virsa Library. Many of these are national award-winning books and a number of these are prescribed at the postgraduate level.

=== Virsa Media Centre ===
The Virsa Media Centre undertakes recordings to focus on traditional music and cultural heritage. It has helped edit, compile and produce a set of fifty one cultural documentaries and three thousand hours of audio recordings. A professional state-of-the-art studio is operational and so are the mobile units which are well-equipped to capture/record event in any part of the country. Lok Virsa is one of the largest publishers of the traditional music and culture. Audio and video cassettes, CDs, VCDs and DVDs produced by Lok Virsa are available in the market. Lok Virsa has edited, compiled and produced a set of 36 cultural documentaries and over 500 audio cassette labels of nation's cultural heritage. A professional video studio has been established by the center at Islamabad. The equipped mobile units of the center can reach any part of the country to capture an event. The center offers professional documentaries and video programs to television networks, universities and other institutions on rental as well as on sale basis. It also markets its productions on CDs and DVDs for home consumption.

Lok Virsa Museum also has an auditorium for public events.

=== Officeholders ===
- Minister, Ministry of Culture and National Heritage.
- Secretary, Ministry of Culture and National Heritage.
- Executive Director, Muhammad Uzair Khan.
- Any 5 selected members
- Adam Nayyar (1948 – 2008) - Former Director of Research, (Anthropologist, Author and Ethnomusicologist). He served the Lok Virsa (Folk Heritage) for 20 years as a Director of Research.

== See also ==
- List of museums in Pakistan
- National Institute of Cultural Studies, Islamabad
