= Rashid Ahmad Khan =

- راشد احمد خان
- Born: 22 February 1985 (age 41); Swabi, Pakistan
- Education: PhD in Pashto Music University of Peshawar, 2022
- Occupations: Singer; Musician; Composer; Broadcaster
- Years active: 2005–present
- Employer: Hunari Tolana
- Musical career
- Origin: Peshawar, Pakistan
- Genres: Pashto; Folk; Ghazal; Tappa; Rubayi
- Instruments: Vocals; Harmonium

Rashid Ahmad Khan (Pashto: راشد احمد خان) (born 22 February 1985, in Jhanda village, Swabi, Khyber Pakhtunkhwa, Pakistan) is a Pashto singer, poet, musicologist, and rights activist. In December 2022, Khan completed his PhD at the University of Peshawar's Pashto Department, becoming the first person to complete a PhD thesis on Pashto folk music.

== Family Background ==
Rashid Khan hails from the Khan family of Jhanda village in Swabi District. Jhanda's history dates back to the early 1800s, when Maiz Ullah Khan, a Pashtun leader from the Yusufzai tribe, entrusted the area to his sons, Khan Bahadur Khan and Fateh Khan. Since then, the village has remained predominantly under the stewardship of the same Khan family, spanning seven generations. Notable figures from Khan's family include the Pakistani politicians Bushra Gohar and Sitara Ayaz.

== Early life and education ==
Khan gained his early education at his hometown Swabi. He then went on to attend University of Peshawar, where he completed his MPhil in Pashto before embarking on his doctoral research.

== Career ==
Khan is the president of Hunari Tolana Welfare Society, an NGO dedicated to the welfare of artists. Under his leadership, the organization has been instrumental in advocating for the rights and protection of both local and Afghan artists, especially in challenging times. He also works as Director of Angaze Music Production which runs under Bacha Khan Trust.
