= Bakhtiar Khattak =

Bakhtiar Khattak بختيار خټک
- Born: Bakhtiar Khattak; Peshawar, Khyber Pakhtunkhwa, Pakistan.
- Occupation: Singer

Bakhtiar Khattak (Pashto: بختيار خټک) is a Pashto musician and singer from Peshawar, Khyber Pakhtunkhwa, Pakistan. He was born in Peshawar, Khyber Pakhtunkhwa. He also worked in AVT Khyber as a host. He is fascinated with Khan Abdul Ghani Khan's poetry.

He started singing in school when he was 4 years old. He had first sung an Urdu song for PTV and also played a role in a PTV drama Tasweroona this was happened when he was gone to audition as a singer, he was surprised to find himself cast as a part of Tasweroona due to his typical Pukhtun features and personality.
