= Ali Baba Khan =

Pakistani singer (born 1993)

Ali Baba Khan علي بابا خان
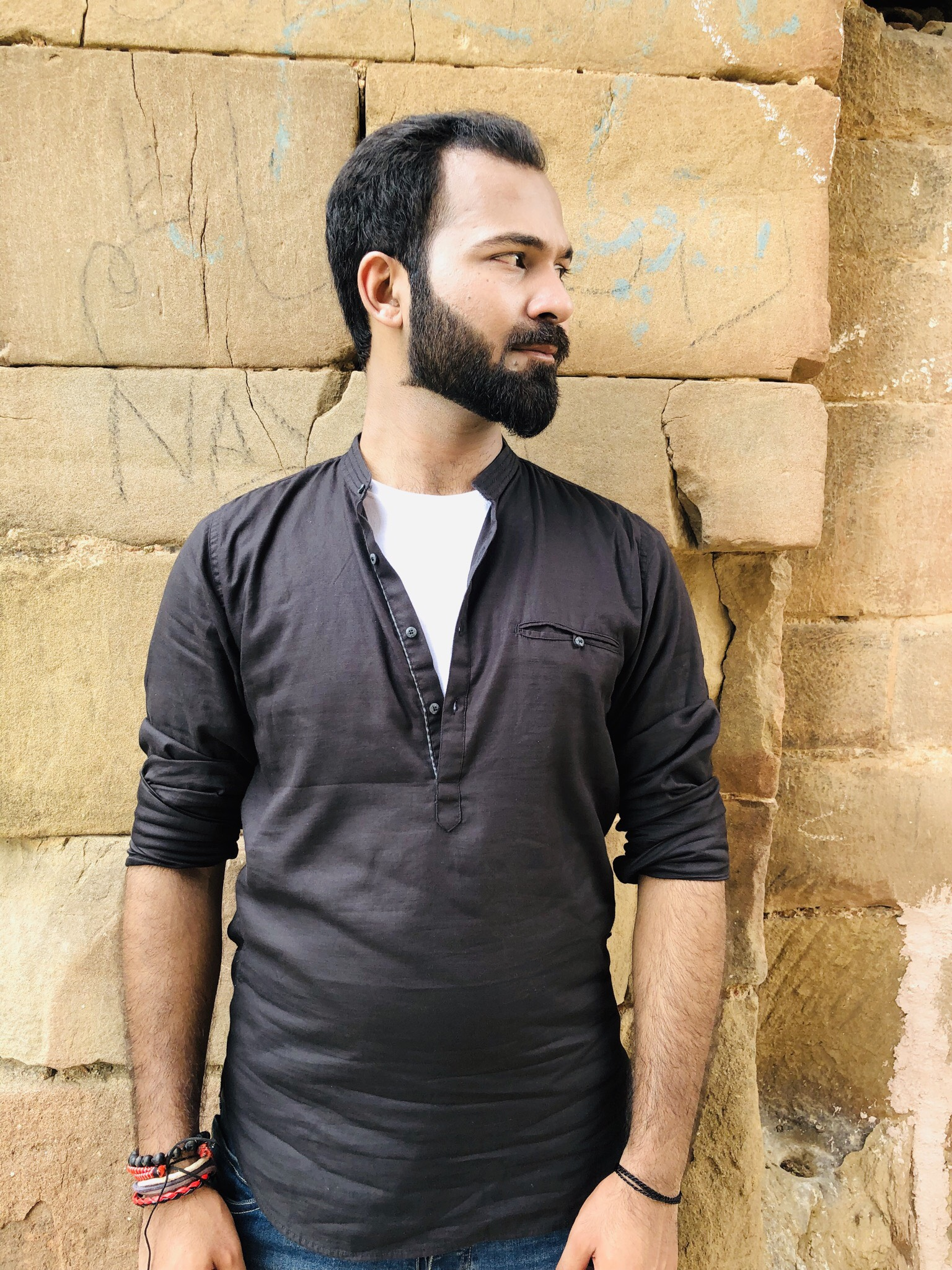

Background information
- Born: Ali Ul Habib; 5 March 1993 (age 33); Peshawar, Khyber Pakhtunkhwa, Pakistan
- Origin: Peshawar
- Genre: Sufi rock
- Occupations: Singer; telecommunications engineer
- Instruments: Vocals, guitar
- Years active: 2009–present
- Label: Ali Baba Khan Records
- Spouse: Lieda Tutakhiel
- Website: www.alibabakhan.com

Ali Baba Khan (Pashto: علي بابا خان; born Ali Ul Habib, 5 March 1993) is a Pakistani Pashtun Sufi singer in the Pashto music industry.

== Early life and education ==
He was born on 5 March 1993 in Peshawar, Khyber Pakhtunkhwa. Khan got his telecommunications engineering degree from the City University of Science and Information Technology in Peshawar.

== Singing career ==
Khan sings in the Pashto language started formally in 2013. He performed at an international Sufi concert in Afghanistan. He paid tribute to the Sufi poet Rahman Baba in his video entitled "Malang Abdur Rahman". He sold his gun to arrange money to create his first video. At the start, he was not allowed by his family to proceed with his music career, but later they accepted his efforts for Pashto music.

In the grand event at Baacha Khan Trust with the eve of Re-Singing Ghani Khan, Ali Baba Khan performed with live band and got praised from audience very much.

Ali Baba Khan was the first to sing a celebrated poem of Ghani Khan Za yaw mast shan lewantoob yam in the genre of Sufi rock. He also introduced his Pure Sufi Rock Band first time in KPK while performing live in Bacha Khan Markaz. Khan is the pioneer of Sufi rock genre in Pashto music. His bandmates are Ali Baba Khan, Jerry Micheal, Joel Micheal, Ostad Mohsin, Qazi Umar and Jalal Khan.

== Popular songs ==
Year	Song	Writer	Reference
2017	"Malang Abdur Rahman"		
2018	"Rooh Da Bacha Khan Yema"		
2018	"Dozakhi"	Bakht Zada Danish	
2018	"Janat Hoora (Hoora Da)"	Bakht Zada Danish	
2019	"Ishq"		
2019	"Sanam"	Ghani Khan	

== Discography ==
=== Albums ===
Video-only releases

  - Tassawar (تصور) (2015) - The First Ever Sufi Rock Music Song written By Ghani Khan, Ali got his recognition from this song.
  - Dozakhi (دوزخی) (2018)

=== Other music ===
Year	Film	Director	Notes
2017	Project Peshawar	Irshu Bangash	Background Music
