= National Institute of Cultural Studies, Islamabad =

Art school in Islamabad, Pakistan

National Institute of Cultural Studies
- Focus: Art
- Address: Islamabad
- Location: Garden Avenue, Shakarparian Rd., Lok Virsa Museum, Islamabad, Pakistan
- Coordinates: 33.689158759813616°N 73.07170446965804°E
- Interactive map of National Institute of Cultural Studies
- Website: nics.org.pk

The National Institute of Cultural Studies (NICS), a semi-public art school, is situated within the Lok Virsa Museum in Islamabad, Pakistan.

== History ==
The National Institute of Cultural Studies (NICS) was established through a Public–private partnership between the Government of Pakistan and Cosmos Productions (Pvt Limited), Islamabad. NICS was founded with the aim of educating and nurturing students, artisans and professionals in the fields of arts, culture, media and business.

Rauf Khalid, who served as the institute's founding President and Chancellor, led NICS until his death in a road accident in 2011.

== Programs and courses ==
National Institute of Cultural Studies consist of seven departments and offers different courses like Arts & Design, Cultural Heritage, Media Sciences and Business Studies at diploma and certificate level.

- Media Studies Department
- Hotel Management Department
- Fashion & Textile Department
- Graphic Design Department
- Interior Design Department
- Beauty and Personal Grooming
- Information Technology Department

== See also ==
- Lok Virsa Museum
