= Rezwan Munawar =

Rezwan Munawar Pashto: رضوان منور
- Born: January 1, 1964 (age 61)
- Origin: Kunar, Afghanistan
- Genres: Folk music
- Years active: 1985–present

Rezwan Munawar (Pashto: رضوان منور, born January 1, 1964) is a Pashto folklore singer who started singing in 1985. He is ethnically Pashtun and belongs to the Safi tribe originally from Mazar valley of Nurgal district of Kunar. He was born in Kuz Kunar district of Nangarhar province in 1964 where he also studied and graduated from Sayed Jamaluddin Afghan High School in 1981.

== Early life ==
In 1982 Munawar started working as a school teacher in Ahmad Kot Intermediate and then in Tawakal baba Intermediate School of Kuz Kunar district. He served twice in the military as a conscript.

During the years of the Taliban in Afghanistan, in 1993 he migrated to Pakistan.

He was married in 1986 and has seven children, one daughter and six sons. He lives in Jalalabad, Afghanistan.

== Career ==
When Munawar migrated to Pakistan in 1993, developed his skills in music and established a voluntary association of Afghan singers based in Pakistan. Today he also heads an association of Afghan singers in Jalalabad.
