= Choughalpura =

Town in Khyber Pakhtunkhwa, Pakistan

Choughalpura is a small town located about 8 km (5.0 mi) from the heart of Peshawar, the capital of Khyber Pakhtunkhwa, a province in northwestern Pakistan. It was a village until the recent rapid growth of Peshawar swelled the size of the city to include the town.

The M-1 Motorway, which connects Peshawar and Islamabad, starts in Choughalpura.

Most of Choughalpura is sandwiched between the M-1 Motorway and Grand Trunk Road, although some parts are located south of the road. The town is part of the NA-3 constituency of the National Assembly of Pakistan.

One of the most famous Pashto folk singer Mashooq Sultan lived in Choughalpura for many years.
