= Farzana Naz =

Afghan singer

Farzana Naz فرزانه ناز
- Born: Baghlan Province, Afghanistan
- Occupation: Singer
- Years active: 2008–present
- Musical career
- Genres: Pop music; Afghan folkloric music
- Instrument: Vocals
- Label: Independent

Farzana Naz (Pashto: فرزانه ناز) (also spelled as Farzana Naaz), is an Afghan female singer born in Baghlan, Afghanistan. She sings mainly Pashto songs and made her first songs in Pakistan, due to the unstable situation in Afghanistan. Her mother is a Dari speaker while her father belongs to the Pashtun tribe. Her song Paighla De Kabul was the biggest hit in Afghanistan in 2010.

Part-time singer in Peshawar, Pakistan. After giving interviews at Pashto entertainment channels like Shamshad TV and Khaybar she became more noticeable. She has performed in many places throughout her life including Iran. Farzana's most popular concert was in Lashkar Gah, Helmand. Twelve thousand people attended the concert and was hailed as a success by local authorities. However, the local Deputy Governor was sacked after tribal leaders got angry, saying he should not have let an Afghan woman without a headscarf sing on stage even though Afghan law does not force women to wear headscarves.

After her song, Shamal was released, Farzana was showered with good responses.

== Music album ==
In July 2021 she has done 'Afghani Tadka' Music Album, track has been released on zee music platform, produced by KR Wahi ( also known as Karan Wahi music director and directed by Shabby.
