= Rahim Shah (musician) =

Pakistani pop music singer (born 1975)

- Born: Muhammad Rahim; 3 April 1975 (age 51); Karachi, Sindh, Pakistan
- Origin: Khyber Pakhtunkhwa, Pakistan
- Genres: Pop
- Occupations: Singer musician
- Years active: 1999–present
- Labels: Fire Records; Sound Master

Rahim Shah (Pashto: رحيم شاه) is a Pakistani pop singer, composer and music producer, predominantly working in Pashto music industry.

He sings primarily in Pashto but has also created songs in Urdu and Punjabi.

== Early life ==
Rahim Shah was born on 3 April 1975 in Karachi, Sindh to a Tirmizi Syed Pashtun family, with his paternal roots in Swat, Khyber Pakhtunkhwa.

In an interview he revealed that Rahim Shah is not his real name and, in fact, it is his elder brother's name. He recently disclosed that his real name is Muhammad Rahim.

== Career ==
Rahim Shah's solo career began in the late 1990s with successful singles. His album Ghum, containing the single Pehle Toh Kabhi Kabhi Ghum Tha, was particularly successful.

=== Audience in India ===
Shah attracted the attention of Indian audience with his 1999 song Pehle Toh Kabhi Kabhi Ghum Tha.

According to a major English-language newspaper in Pakistan, "Ghum is not Rahim Shah's personal composition. It is a Pashtun folk song or tappa, sung by famous Pashtun singer, Haroon Bacha. Rahim Shah translated the "tappa" into Urdu and changed the arrangement."

== Discography ==
=== Albums ===
Bacha (1998)

Dheerey Dheerey (1999)

- Ghum (2000)
- Saba Ru (2001)
- Channa (2002)
- Laila
- O Peera
- Jhoola (playground swing) (song dedicated to Rahim Shah's mother, also written by him)
- Sadma Bewafa Ka
- Pyar Nahin Milta (June 2009)
- Yarana (October 2009)
- Allah Hoo Allah (February 2010)
- Chercha (May 2010)
- Maa'ma Dey (April 2011)
- Gul Jana (2013)

== Film career ==
- Pakistani film Yeh Dil Aap Ka Huwa (2002) (playback singer)
- In 2011, Rahim Shah announced at Peshawar Press Club that he would play a lead role in a Pashto language film which would also depict the true Pakhtun culture.

In June 2020, Rahim Shah tested positive for COVID-19, self-isolated himself and asked his followers to pray for his fast recovery.
