= Irfan Khan (singer) =

Pakistani singer

Irfan Khan عرفان خان
- Born: Irfan Khan; May 5, 1982 (age 44); Peshawar, Khyber Pakhtunkhwa, Pakistan
- Occupation: Singer
- Website: http://www.irfankhan.tv

Irfan Khan (Pashto: عرفان خان) is a Pakistani Pashtun pop singer singing in both Pashto and Urdu. His claim to fame is his Pashto single "Pekhawar Khu Pekhawar De" ("Peshawar Is Peshawar") which he wrote and sang as an ode to his hometown. He recently recorded a single with Hadiqa Kiyani called "Jaanan". "Jaanan" was the title song from Irfan's album of the same name. "Jaanan" proved to be a superhit song all over Pakistan in 2010. It even made it to the Los Angeles Times' "What they are..." section.

== Background ==
Irfan Khan was born on May 5, 1982, in Mardan, Khyber Pakhtunkhwa, Pakistan. his father worked as a Manager for a Pakistani Bank. Irfan started his education at the age of 6 in Swat and later on in Azad Kashmir. He did his Matriculation examination (10th grade) from Peshawar Model School, intermediate examinations (12th grade) from Edwardes College, Peshawar and got his BA Degree in Communication Design from the University of Peshawar and degree in hospitality and hotel management.

== Career ==
From the epoch of schooling he took part in Naat competitions. In college, he realized his passion for music, where he started exploring Pashto music. Fortunately this was the beginning of new era in Pashtun media. He recorded his first Pashto single "Pekhawar Khu Pekhawar de" which Khyber TV broadcast, and which became an instant hit and put Irfan in the growing Pashto music scene.

Irfan went on to record his first Pashto album "Brekhna" which was very well received within the Pashtun community in Pakhtunkhwa and overseas. The songs soon emerged all over internet and were downloaded all around the world. His song "Zema De Stergo Na Panaa Gulaba" was especially well received overseas, which describes the longing of expatriates for their homeland.

Irfan went on to participate on various television shows and live performances including a solo concert in Boston and in Kuala Lumpur.

== Chounay Day ==
Irfan has also launched his first Urdu album "Chounay Day". The songs are composed and recorded in Karachi, Lahore and Islamabad. He also recorded a video for the title song from this Album in Atlanta. And he has recorded a video of the song "Janaan" with Hadiqa Kiani.
