= Project Peshawar =

2017 film

- Theatrical release poster
- Project Peshawar
- Directed by: Irshu Bangash
- Written by: Junaid Kamran Siddique
- Screenplay by: Hammad khan
- Produced by: Junaid Kamran Siddique; Shoaib Lodin; Javed Khan Mohmand
- Starring: Shoaib Lodin; Navishta Sahar; Sally Ingry; Moez Mohmand; Mihela Bursc; Arbab Izhar Ahmad; James Ryan; Mustafa Khan; Mariyam Dilawar Jan
- Cinematography: Irshu Bangash
- Music by: Fortitude; Khumariyaan; King compass Naseer and Shahab
- Production company: Jeans Films
- Release dates: August 20, 2017 (Peshawar, Pakistan); 2018 (US, UK, Canada and the Netherlands)
- Country: Pakistan
- Languages: Pashto; Urdu; Dutch; English

Project Peshawar is a 2017 Pakistani multilingual suspense thriller film. It incorporated Pashto, Urdu, Dutch, and English language. It was Khyber Pakhtunkhwa's first internationally released film. Project Peshawar was particularly popular in global media because Peshawar, the capital of the province, was the hub of militant activity for years.

Project Peshawar is a blend of eastern and western cultures, highlighting the negative side of modern-day social media. The film also highlights the importance and legacy of the city of Peshawar at national and international levels. Project Peshawar revived Pashto cinema due to its production quality and talented cast members.

== Plot ==
Project Peshawar is based on a true story and revolves around a British Pakistani who falls in love with a Peshawar-based woman on the internet, and travels back to Pakistan to realize that it was merely a trap to capture him.

The story highlights the negative side of the modern-day social media boom, and is intended to raise awareness as to how some people use social media negatively.

== Cast ==
- Shoaib Lodin
- Navishta Sahar
- Sally Ingry
- Moez Mohmand
- Mihela Bursc
- Arbab Izhar Ahmad
- James Ryan
- Mustafa Khan
- Mariyam
- Dilawar Jan

== Filming ==
Principal photography took place in the United Kingdom, the Netherlands, and Pakistan, with 70% of the production in Peshawar. The male lead of the film, Shoaib Lodin, who also acted as a consultant producer on the film, is an Afghan-Dutch citizen who left Peshawar in 1997. He is a graduate of the Film and Television Institute of India.

== Release ==
Project Peshawar was released on 20 August 2017 in Peshawar, premiering at Nishtar Hall. The premiere was sponsored by Jeans Films and the Tourism Corporation of Khyber Pakhtunkhwa. It was later shown at film festivals in the United States, Canada and the Netherlands.

== Critical reception ==
Film-maker Irshu Bangash told The Express Tribune that people from the local entertainment industry were trying to sabotage the film, claiming that it portrays the city negatively and "promotes western values" instead of local cultural values. Bangash shared how they decided to do a film about social media and how it's misused. "We see it all around us. Even Mashal Khan's case was elevated due to social media and its power," he said. "It's funny because these are our seniors, yet a lot of inappropriate content has been released without any objections because of the lack of censor board in Khyber Pakhtunkhwa."

== Official website ==
projectpeshawar.com

== Soundtrack ==
Musicians involved in the production of the soundtrack include Fortitude, Khumariyaan, King Compass and the duo of Naseer & Shahab.

ProjectPeshawar

Soundtrack album
- Released: 20 August 2017
- Genre: Film soundtrack
- Length: 17:07
- Languages: English, Pashto and Urdu
- Director: Irshu Bangash

Track listing
| No. | Title | Singer(s) | Length |
|---|---|---|---|
| 1. | "Chaukor" | Khumariyaan | 1:36 |
| 2. | "Okha" | Billboard Band | 3:59 |
| 3. | "Rise On My Broken Knees" | Naseer & Shahab | 4:43 |
| 4. | "So Fly" | Fortitude | 4:16 |
| 5. | "Someday Someone" | King Compass | 3:53 |
| Total length: | | | 17:07 |
