= Ibrahim Khan (Pakistani cricketer) =

Pakistani cricketer (born 1964)

Personal information
- Born: Karachi, Pakistan
- Source: Cricinfo, 17 April 2016

Ibrahim Khan (born 1964) is a Pakistani former cricketer. He played two first-class matches for Rawalpindi in 1985/86.

== See also ==
- List of Hyderabad cricketers
