= Ali Khan, Haripur =

Ali Khan علی خان
- Town and union council
- Location in Pakistan
- Coordinates: 33°59′22″N 72°58′7″E
- Country: Pakistan
- Region: Khyber-Pakhtunkhwa
- District: Haripur
- Time zone: UTC+5 (PST)

Ali Khan (Urdu & Hindko: علی خان) is one of the 44 union councils of Haripur District in Khyber-Pakhtunkhwa province of Pakistan. The inhabitants of Ali Khan speak Pashto and Hindko. It is located east of the district capital, Haripur, at 33°59'22N 72°58'7E.
