= Rehan Alikhan =

British Pakistani cricketer

Cricket information
- Batting: Right-handed
- Bowling: Right-arm off break

Career statistics
Competition	First-class	List A
Matches	113	30
Runs scored	4,909	435
Batting average	27.42	18.91
100s/50s	2/32	0/2
Top score	138	71
Balls bowled	545	270
Wickets	8	2
Bowling average	48.37	92.50
5 wickets in innings	0	0
10 wickets in match	0	0
Best bowling	2/19	1/26
Catches/stumpings	61/–	5/–
- Source: CricketArchive, 30 December 2021

Rehan Iqbal Alikhan (Urdu: ریحان اقبال علی خان; born 28 December 1962) is a British-born former cricketer of Pakistani descent. He was a right-handed batsman and an occasional off-break bowler. He was born in Westminster, London.

Alikhan's cricketing career began in 1986 for Sussex with a debut against Cambridge University, and he then retained his place in the side for the rest of the season, playing largely as an opening batsman.

At the end of 1986 Alikhan went to Pakistan to play for Pakistan International Airlines, where he debuted in the Patron's Trophy and played in the Final of the PACO Cup, which his team won by a ten-run margin. Alikhan returned to England for the 1987 season, and was again a regular in the Sussex side. Used less frequently in 1988, he moved at the end of the season to Surrey for 1989.

For Surrey, Alikhan scored the only two centuries of his career in his final two matches of the 1990 season, against Middlesex and Essex. He had his best season in 1991, scoring 1055 runs, though not making any further centuries. However, he played just one County Championship game during 1992, and 1993 was his final season in England; he moved back to play with the Pakistan National Shipping Corporation for the 1993–94 season, where he lasted for two years before giving up the game.
