= Adam Nayyar =

Pakistani anthropologist and ethnomusicologist (1948–2008)

- Born: 10 December 1948; Bahawalpur, Pakistan
- Died: 29 July 2008 (aged 59); Islamabad, Pakistan
- Occupations: Anthropologist, author and ethnomusicologist
- Employer(s): Lok Virsa (Folk Heritage)(Director Research); Pakistan National Council of the Arts (Executive Director)
- Awards: Ordre des Arts et des Lettres (Knighthood or Order of Arts and Letters) Award from the Government of France for his contributions to cultural life of the world.

Adam Nayyar (10 December 1948 – 29 July 2008) was a Pakistani anthropologist, researcher, author and ethnomusicologist.

He served as the Director Research at the Lok Virsa (Folk Heritage) for twenty years. He was the executive director of Pakistan National Council of the Arts (PNCA) when he died.

== Early life ==
Nayyar was born on 10 December 1948 in Bahawalpur, Punjab, Pakistan. He studied cultural anthropology at the University of Heidelberg, Germany.

== Career ==
Adam Nayyar did some pioneering research on Pakistani music especially related to qawwali.

"Dr Nayyar was valued as an authority on Pakistani music, especially Sufi and folk music, and culture. His areas of interests and experience were ethnographic investigations, teaching and training, music and Silk Route music".

"Dr Nayyar was instrumental in putting Nusrat Fateh Ali Khan on the world map of music. In 1991, working as a team anthropologist, he produced a film on the musical heritage of Pakistan titled Pardesi which won an "Honorable Mention Award" at the Cannes Film Festival".

He was also a faculty member at the Quaid-e-Azam University, Islamabad.

== Awards and recognition ==
- Ordre des Arts et des Lettres (Knighthood or Order of Arts and Letters) Award from the Government of France for his contributions to cultural life of the world.
- Silver medal Award for two of his co-produced films with a French team titled 'Religious and Sufi Music' and 'The Music of Balochistan' at the Florence Film Festival.

== Death ==
Nayyar died on 29 July 2008 in Islamabad, at age 59 due to cancer of lymph nodes. Many literary figures including Naeem Tahir and his close friends attended his funeral.
