= Gulzar Alam =

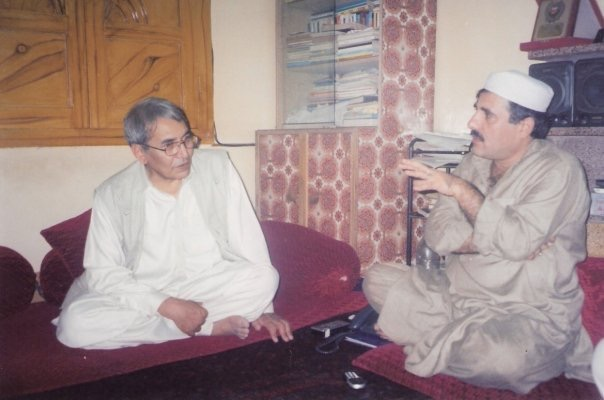
- Gulzar Alam with Kabir Stori

Background information
- Born: Gulzar Alam; October 14, 1959 (age 66); Peshawar, Pakistan
- Occupations: Singer & artist

Gulzar Alam (Pashto: ګلزار عالم) is a Pashto singer from Pakistan. He is a famous Pashto folk and Ghazal singer, musician, and composer with fan base from Pakistan, Afghanistan, and around the world. He completed his bachelor’s degree in fine-arts from the University of Peshawar. He also started learning music from renowned and leading musicians and singers (Sultani Ustaz, Ghulam Ali Ustaz and Mehdi Hassan Ustaz) of the time in 1980 and professionally started his singing career in 1982 by making a debut in Pakistan Television Centre Peshawar.

Gulzar Alam is the first Pashto singer who used his music and singing to challenge the status quo. Gulzar Alam is a pioneer of Pashto revolutionary music. He released around 1,100–1,200 music albums in his professional career as a singer.

== Life and career ==
In January 2003, Gulzar was arrested while performing at a private wedding, but was later released. Gulzar said he was "humiliated" by this. However, a more serious event took place in April of that year, when 27 police officers forced entry to his home and arrested his three sons and a brother. He stopped singing after receiving anonymous letters warning of the consequences of singing in public and started selling property instead. He eventually fled to Karachi. In 2005, he moved to Quetta.

However, following the elections of February 2008, the nationalist Awami National Party replaced the Muttahida Majlis-e-Amal and they not only opened Nashtar Hall for cultural activities but invited Gulzar Alam back to sing. Gulzar Alam accepted the invitation wholeheartedly and started his singing career again. In April 2008, Peshawar's Nishtar Hall was the city’s only auditorium for promoting cultural activities, which reopened after five years of closure due to the policies of the previous government. Gulzar was one the artists who performed at the reopening.

Gulzar Alam was awarded “Baacha Khan Peace Award” twice in recognition of his services for Pashto music and peace. He won the first prize in “All Pakistan Music Festival” in 1994. Apart from receiving many regional, national and international awards and titles, in 2011, the government, in order to recognize his services in the field of music and peace, awarded him one of the highest prestigious award of the country, the “Presidential Pride of Performance Award”.

In October 2017, he left Peshawar, crossing Torkham, to move to Kabul, due to financial hardship and alleged poor treatment of him in Khyber Pakhtunkhwa's cultural department. Artists, civil societies, and fans were divided on the issue.

After 4 years, in December 2020, Gulzar returned to Peshawar. Fans welcomed his return to Peshawar. He said the actual reason he went to Kabul is because local traders threatened to attack him and his family. While on Kabul, a rumor circulated that he was singing songs against Pakistan and speaking out against his people. He denied it, saying "I used to attend and perform at private functions and used to sing popular numbers advocating peace, brotherhood, mutual understanding and national cohesion,” the Dawn newspaper reported.

In the future, he said that he wanted to put up albums on Gulzar's YouTube channel and establish an art academy in Islamabad.
