= Gul Panra =

Pakistani Pashto language singer (born 1989)

- گل پانڑہ • ګل پاڼه
- Born: Mehnaz; 6 September 1989 (age 36); Peshawar, North-West Frontier Province, Pakistan (present-day Khyber Pakhtunkhwa)
- Education: University of Peshawar (MSW)
- Occupations: Singer; Artist
- Years active: 2012–present
- Height: 5 ft 7 in (170 cm)
- Musical career
- Genres: Folk; Romantic; Classical; Alternative music
- Instrument: Vocals

Mehnaz, known professionally as Gul Panra (sometimes spelled Gulpanra; Pashto: ګل پاڼه; Urdu: گل پانڑہ; born 6 September 1989), is a Pakistani folk singer and touring artist, mainly associated with Pashto language music industry. Her live concerts are famous in Pakistan and she has also performed in the United Kingdom and Afghanistan. She has been serving as a brand ambassador of her home cricket team Peshawar Zalmi in Pakistan Super League, and has sung several anthems for the team since its inception in 2016.

In 2015, she sang "Man Aamadeh Am", a remix version of the Persian language song with Atif Aslam. In 2018, she sang "Hawa Hawa" with the singer Hassan Jahangir. In 2021, she was featured in the cover version of "Larsha Pekhawar" by Ali Zafar.

== Early life ==
Born Mehnaz on the 6th of September, 1989 in the city of Peshawar, North-West Frontier Province to a middle class family of the Yousafzai tribe of Pashtuns from the Swat Valley. She came into prominence after her appearance on Pakistani television and media. She was from a conservative family and her mother had issues with her singing career. She gained admission into Peshawar University and completed her Masters in Social Work. She began her career in 2010 as an enthusiastic and skilled Pashto vocalist and quickly rose to fame.

== Discography ==
=== Pashto film songs ===
Year	Song	Film	Composer	Co-singer
2013	"Mashallah Mashallah"	Zama Arman	Shakir Zeb	
2013	"Oos Kho Me Zargay Shwe"	Zama Arman	Shakir Zeb	Sandeep Sawar
2013	"Che Zrra De Mala Raku"	Zama Arman	Shakir Zeb	Aakash Khan
2015	"Za Bubly Bubly"	Nasha	Shakir Zeb	
2015	"Man Aamadeh Am"	Coke Studio Pakistan	Jalil Zaland	Atif Aslam
2016	"Janan De Janaan"	Gul-e-Jana	Ivan Shafiq	Shan Khan
2016	"Sta Da Ishq Baranoona"	Gul-e-Jana	Ivan Shafiq	
2017	"Tanha Tanha"	Gul-e-Jana	Ivan Shafiq	Shan Khan
