= City University of Science and Information Technology =

University in Peshawar, Pakistan

City University of Science and IT
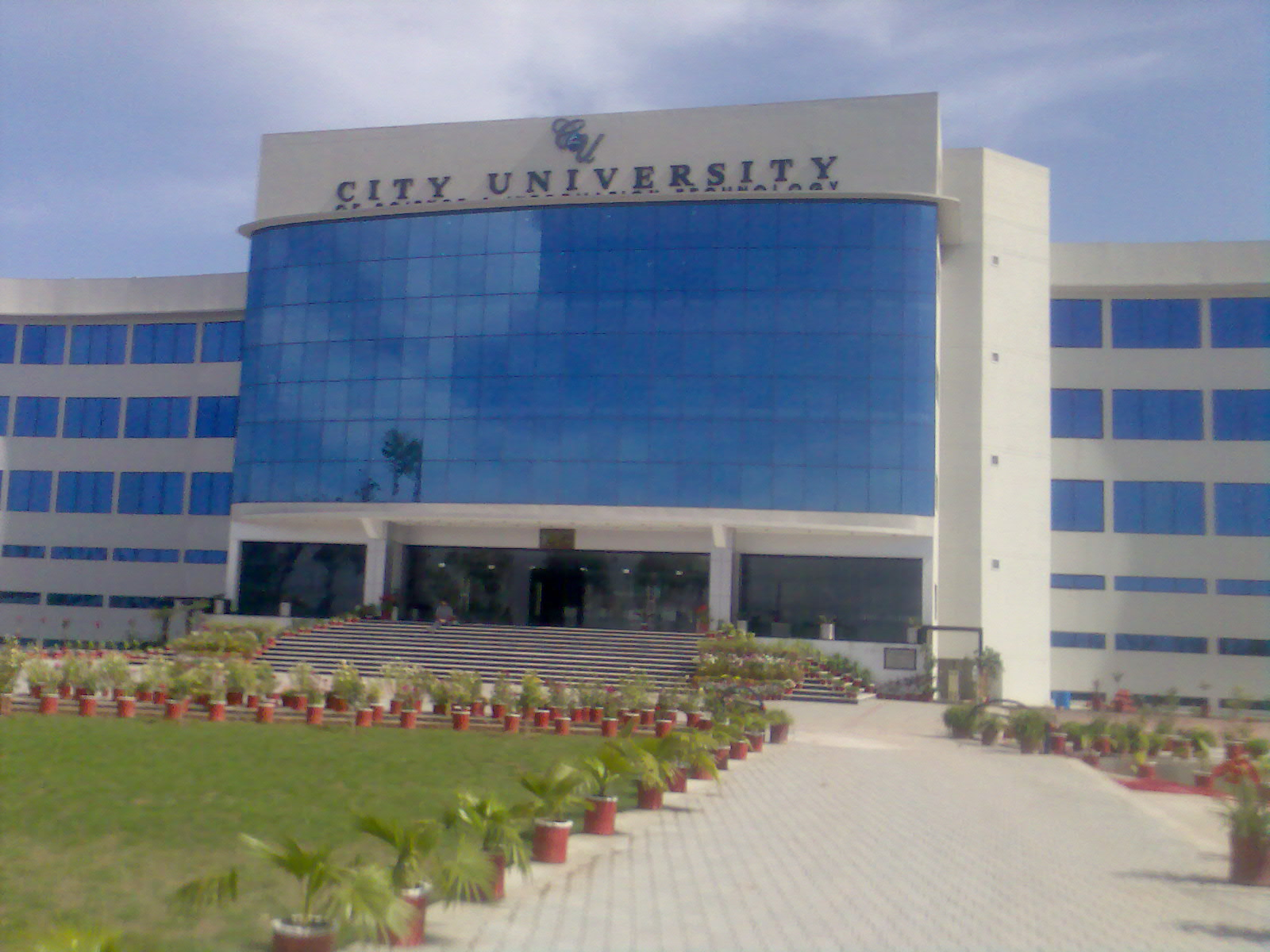
- Other names: CUSIT
- Type: Private
- Established: August 2001; 24 years ago
- Accreditation: HEC
- Chancellor: Governor of Khyber Pakhtunkhwa
- Vice-Chancellor: Minhaj Ul Hassan
- Location: Peshawar, Khyber Pakhtunkhwa, Pakistan
- Website: cityuniversity.edu.pk

City University of Science and Information Technology, Peshawar (CUSIT) is a private-sector university based in Peshawar, Khyber Pakhtunkhwa, Pakistan. It is chartered by the government of Khyber Pakhtunkhwa, recognized by the Higher Education Commission (HEC), and allowed to operate by the Pakistan Engineering Council (PEC).

== History and progress ==
Founded in 1979. Initially, a primary school was established by Muhammad Zahoor Sethi (Founder), comprising just one moderate campus with 300 students. But, in due course of time, the establishment of eleven separate school campuses, four degree college campuses for boys and two degree college campuses for girls, with a combined strength of over 26,000 students. Currently, the university is managed by teams of Board Of Governors, Academic Council, Board of Advanced Studies & Research, Selection Board and Finance & Planning Committee.

== Faculties ==
Currently, there are ten faculties:

- Faculty of Computer Science & IT
- Faculty of Management Sciences
- Faculty of Electrical Engineering
- Faculty of Civil Engineering
- Faculty of Architecture
- Faculty of Education
- Faculty of Mathematics
- Faculty of Health Sciences
- Faculty of English
- Faculty of Engineering Technology
