= Ali Khan (brigadier) =

Pakistan Army former brigadier

Brigadier Ali Khan
- Military career
- Allegiance: Pakistan
- Branch: Pakistan Army
- Service years: 1979–2011
- Rank: Brigadier
- Service number: PA-13615
- Unit: Infantry
- Commands: Brigade, Azad Kashmir
- Awards: PMA Gold Medal, United Nations Service Ribbon (Bosnia)

Ali Khan is a former brigadier of Pakistan Army who was arrested in May 2011 for links with banned Islamist organisation Hizb ut-Tahrir. He was the senior most Pakistani officer to face such allegations since 1995. His arrest raised suspicions of infiltration by Islamic fundamentalists into the senior officer corps of Pakistani Army.

== Career ==
Khan belonged to Punjab had joined the army in 1979 and had a distinguished career. At the time of his arrest Khan had been in the army for 32 years during which time he had served with United Nations Protection Force in Bosnia, did a company commander's course in Japan and an alumnus of US Command and General Staff College Fort Leavenworth and was about to retire. Khan was also a graduate of the Industrial College of the Armed forces, one of the senior service colleges that is part of the National Defense University. Khan's father was a Junior Commissioned Officer, his brother is a colonel, His both sons and son-in-law are captains in Pakistan army. Khan had been a vocal critic of the US raid that killed Osama bin Laden and had raised questions at a meeting of Pakistani generals. He had previously criticised General Pervez Musharraf for his support to America and his promotion to major general was blocked. At the time of arrest he was the oldest brigadier in Pakistani army having been rejected for promotion repeatedly. After the arrest Khans wife stated that he was a man with an ideology and a staunch Muslim who believed "Pakistan was made in the name of Islam and the Islamic laws should be enforced. This is the ideology of Pakistan." He had grown his beard about a year prior to his arrest.

== Arrest and court-martial ==
Khan was serving at the general headquarters of Pakistani army in Rawalpindi at the time of his arrest on 6 May 2011. The arrest was announced on 21 June 2011. Pakistan Army spokesperson Major general Athar Abbas claimed that there was compelling evidence against Khan. According to BBC General Ashfaq Parvez Kayani had personally ordered his arrest after examining evidence against Khan. However, on 28 June 2011 it was reported that Brigadier Khan was to be released soon as not enough evidence had been found to formally charge him. From his prison cell, Khan released a six-page manifesto calling for Pakistan to sever its anti-terrorism alliance with the United States.

A Field General Court Martial convened in February 2012. On 3 August 2012, the court found Khan guilty of maintaining links with a banned organisation and of attempting to incite fellow officers to disobey lawful commands, imposing the maximum penalty short of life imprisonment, five years of rigorous confinement.
