= Par Hoti =

Coordinates: 34°12′N 72°04′E

- Village and union council
- Interactive map of Par Hoti
- Country: Pakistan
- Region: Khyber Pakhtunkhwa
- District: Mardan District
- Time zone: UTC+5 (PST)

Par Hoti is a village and union council in Mardan District of Khyber Pakhtunkhwa. Par Hoti is situated across the Kalpani ravine which splits the Hoti, Mardan area and also acts as key stream for agriculture across the city.

The area has produced a number of key politicians including members of Senate, Dilawar Khan (Khankhel) of Muslim League (Pakistan) Khanzada Khan (Khankhel) hailing from Pakistan Peoples Party,(Late)Javid Mohammad khel khudaie Hidmatgar from ANP, Zeeshan Khanzada (Khankhel) of Pakistan Tehreek-e-Insaf. Provincial Senior minister Atif Khan from Pakistan Tehreek-e-Insaf and Haji Nasim ur Rehman from Awami National Party. Mushtaq Seemab (Tehsil Naib Nazim 2015 - 2019), Kaleem Bacha & Malik Waqar Khan (of Malik Qilla) from Jamaat-e-Islami.

The total population of Par Hoti is approximately 400,000 as per the 2017 census. High Cast families in Par Hoti are Yarkhaani, Khankhels, Muhammad Khels, NurmanKhels and Azikhel. Other people living in this area include the Mandoori, Syeds, Loharan, Malazi, Bajauri.

The area has a number of schools including private and government schools. In healthcare facilities, there is one government BHU but many private clinics including Qazi Hospital, Khaslat Clinic, and Samsons Trust Welfare Hospital.
