= Shah Wali Taranasaz =

شاہ ولی Taranasaz
- Born: 1927; Badakhshan, Afghanistan
- Died: 2007 (aged 79–80)
- Genres: Ghazals; Classical music
- Occupation: Singer
- Years active: 1963–present
- Label: Various

Shah Wali Taranasaz (Persian: شاه ولی ترانه ساز), 1927 - 2007, was a “much admired” singer, songwriter and composer from Badakhshan, Afghanistan.

== Life ==
Taranasaz sang more than 300 songs in Persian. He composed traditional and popular songs and some that were critical of the Taliban.

After fleeing Afghanistan, Taranasaz moved to New York City, and later to Fremont, where he could be closer to the Afghan music scene.

He died in 2007 and was survived by a wife and two children.
