= Haroon Bacha =

- هارون باچا
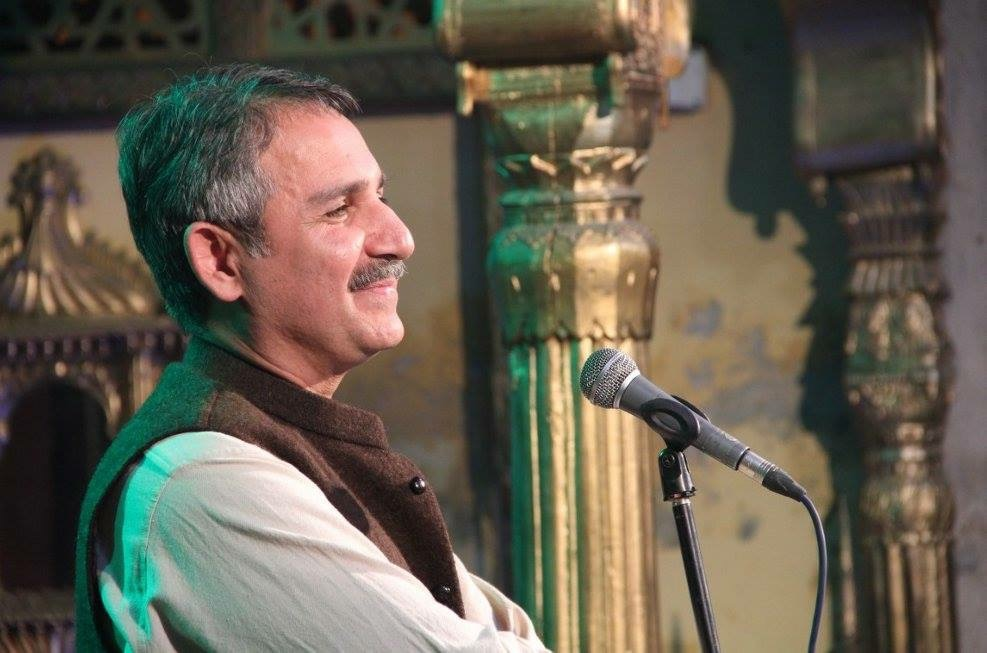
- Bacha performing at AVT Khyber's "Sparle Suroona" in Peshawar in 2017
- Born: July 27, 1972 (age 54); Panjpir, Swabi, Pakistan
- Education: Master's degree in Social Work at University of Peshawar, 1994
- Occupations: Singer; musician; composer; broadcaster
- Years active: 1992–present
- Employer: Mashaal Radio
- Musical career
- Origin: Peshawar, Pakistan
- Genres: Pashto; folk; ghazal; tappa; rubayi
- Instruments: Vocals; harmonium

Haroon Bacha (Pashto: هارون باچا) (born July 27, 1972) is a Pashtun singer and composer who, since beginning his musical career in 1992, has released upwards of 50 albums and numerous singles. Bacha is renowned for songs such as "Awal Ba Kala Kala Gham Wo", "Stergey Ghazal", and "Yaar Zhaghaida".

== Early life ==
Haroon Bacha was born on July 27, 1972, in Panjpir, Swabi, Pakistan. He received his early education at Govt. High School Panjpir, followed by his matriculation from Govt. High School No. 1 Peshawar. Bacha completed his F.Sc. and B.A. from Edwardes College in 1992, and his master's degree in Social Work from the University of Peshawar in 1994.

Bacha had a natural flair for singing, taking part in Naat Qirat and singing competitions throughout his early school days. Govt. High School No. 1 provided some chances for young Haroon Bacha to exhibit his hidden talent, but it was the music club of Edwardes College that garnered him a real place in the world of Pashto music.

== Career ==
Haroon Bacha's musical career began in 1992 with a live television performance in Peshawar, Pakistan. His first album, "Da Rangoono Makhaam", was released in 1996, with "Ghwanchakoona" being released shortly thereafter. It was this second album that featured Bacha's most influential song to date, "Awal Ba Kala Kala Gham Wo". The song consists of Pashto tappa poems, and has since been translated into Urdu, Persian, Arabic, and English by numerous artists.

Since "Ghwanchakoona", Bacha has released more than 48 albums along with singles like "Stergey Ghazal", "May Wey Nen Ba Haal", and "Deedan (Tapey)". Some of his recent albums include "Woolas Janaan Krra", "Heele", and "Gulrang".

Bacha's musical career came to a crossroads in 2007 when he began receiving threats from the Pakistani Taliban. Through repeated text messages and phone calls, the Taliban asked him to quit music upon threat of death for him and his family. These threats lasted approximately one year until Bacha fled his home for Brooklyn, New York, where he was granted political asylum.

In 2009, Bacha became Radio Free Europe / Radio Liberty's Mashaal Radio branch's first employee as a broadcaster. In 2012, RFE/RL relocated him to work from their headquarters in Prague, Czechia. Bacha has continued his musical career from abroad (with songs such as "Sawdagara", "Ma Ragora Sam Sam", and "Shamalooky") while hosting various music-related programs for Mashaal Radio.

Inspired by him, his nephew Gulwareen Bacha has also chosen music as a career.
