= Kishwar Sultan =

Pakistani singer (1936–2001)

- Born: Kishwar Sultan Khan; 6 January 1936; NWFP, British Raj, British India
- Died: 21 September 2001 (aged 65); Khyber Pakhtunkhwa, Peshawar, Pakistan
- Resting place: Peshawar
- Other name: Kishwar Sultana
- Occupations: Singer; radio artist; playback singer; folk singer
- Years active: 1951–1991
- Spouse: Tariq Mehmood
- Children: 7
- Honours: Pride of Performance (1979)

Kishwar Sultan was a Pakistani classical singer and a film playback singer. She was a leading voice in Pashto folk music and did playback singing for films.

== Early life ==
Sultan was born in 1936 at NWFP during British India. Her father, Chaudhary Roshan Khan, and her mother, Bakht Nissa (Were not singers), but her aunts were singers. Mehr-un-Nisa, Chishti Chaman Jan and Sabr-un-Nisa were associated with the field of music. Khayal Muhammad was her son in Law and Singers like Mashooq Sultan, Shakila Naz, Farida Khan, Iqbal Banu, Jannana (Daughter), Wisal Khayal (Grand Son) Kishwar was trained in music education by Farah Sher Shama, Sohbat Khan Baba and Rafiq Shinwari.

Later, her husband trained her in basic education, teaching her to read and write Pashto and Urdu.

== Career ==
Sultan started singing on Radio Peshawar in the 1951. She recorded her first song, "Ya Illahi Rawalay Yao Zal Guli Khandan", which was written by the poet Gulistan. Sultan's distinctive, emotional voice, rich with soz and dard (sadness), quickly made her a favorite among listeners.

In 1965, she was transferred to Lahore and she sang many songs for the army to boast their morale in the Indo-Pakistani War of 1965 and events of Kashmir.

In 1971, Sultan moved permanently to Peshawar from Mardan and began to sing on Radio and Pakistan Television. Her fame spread throughout Pakistan. Her songs "Hoy Tappe" and "Loba" became very popular. Filmmakers included her songs in their films.

She also did live performances and sang many songs on television. In 1975, she recorded the song "Ruk Da Meenay Noom Sha Dagha Hall Ta Chi Nazar Kri Sook" for the Pashto film Deedan, which was written by Ustaz Amir Ghulam Sadiq.

In 1979, she was honored by the Government of Pakistan with the Pride of Performance award for her contributions to the music industry.

In the 1980s, she sang many songs on PTV musical programs and music shows.

In 1991, she sang a remix of her own old song "Zar Sham Maida Maida Maida Maida, Qurban Sham Warray, Warra Warra Raza" on Radio Pakistan. Then she retired and went to live with one of her sons at Mardan.

She Did playback singing for more than 200 Pashto movies.

== Personal life ==
Sultan married her cousin, Tariq Mehmood. The couple had seven children: three sons and four daughters. Only their youngest son Khalid Khan became a singer. She trained her daughter Janana in a similar style, and she became a well known singer in the 1970s.

== Death ==
Kishwar Sultan died at the age of 65 on September 21, 2001, in Peshawar, Pakistan.

== Filmography ==
=== Film ===
Year	Film	Language
1971	Dara Khayber	Pashto
1973	Mailmah	Pashto
1975	Baghi	Pashto
1975	Deedan	Pashto

== Awards and recognition ==
Year	Award	Category	Result	Title	Ref.
1979	Pride of Performance	Award by the President of Pakistan	Won	Radio & Music	
