= Awalmir =

Afghan musician

Awalmir استاد اولمیر
- Born: May 8, 1931; British India, Peshawar
- Died: April 24, 1982 (aged 50-51) Kabul, Afghanistan
- Genres: Ghazals Classical music
- Occupation: Singer
- Instruments: Harmonium, guitar
- Years active: 1949 – 1982
- Label: Various

Ustad Awalmir (Pashto: استاد اولمیر) (May 8, 1931 – April 24, 1982) was an Afghan composer, musician, singer, and poet who wrote and sang in the Pashto language.

He began learning music as a teen from various music teachers and began to perform for radio broadcasts. His first song was My Heart Has Broken To Pieces. At the age of 18, he performed at the Afghan Independence Day in Kabul.

He made a breakthrough into performing on the Afghan radio station with help from Malang Jan, a local poet. Awalmir's output consists of over 250 songs. His contribution to Afghan music led him the honor of the title Ustad from the Ministry of Culture and Information.

His songs include "Da Zamong Zeba Watan", meaning "this is our beautiful homeland", referring to Afghanistan.
