= Nazia Iqbal =

Pakistani singer

Nazia Iqbal (Urdu: نازيه اقبال) (born c.1984) is a Pashtun singer from Swat, Pakistan. She was affiliated with Peshawar Zalmi cricket team as an ambassador. She performs across the globe especially in United Arab Emirates, United Kingdom and other parts of the world. She also sings in Urdu, Persian, and Arabic.

She currently resides in London, United Kingdom with her children. She divorced Dilawaiz Aman (Basharat Senior property dealer), whom she had been married to since 2005, in 2019. However, they reconciled later and remarried.

== See also ==
- List of Pashto-language singers
