= Zeek Afridi =

Zeek Afridi زيک آفريدى
- Born: Zahid Noor Afridi; 1 April 1979 (age 46); Peshawar, Pakistan
- Genres: Pop
- Occupation: Singer
- Years active: 2001–present
- Website: https://www.youtube.com/user/zeekafridiofficial/

Zeek Afridi (Pashto: زيک آفريدى; born Zahid Noor Afridi on 1 April 1979 in Peshawar) is a Pashtun singer from Pakistan.

== Early life and career ==
Afridi belongs to the Afridi tribe of Tirah. He was raised and educated in Peshawar. He attended F.G. Boys Public School and Government College Peshawar. After graduating, he obtained a Master's degree from University of Peshawar. He starts singing from his college life, he often won first prize in singing competitions. After completion of his Master's degree in 2001, he released his first album "Bibisherinay" – it was a selection of folk songs in Pushto and later he released Urdu versions of the album. He has also sung an official anthem for the Peshawar Zalmi named "Zalmi Tarana" or "O Da Pekhawar Zalmi.

== Awards and nominations ==
Year	Nominee / work	Award	Result
2015	Best singer award PTV		Nominated
2016	16th Ptv awards best singer National awards		Won
2017	Pakistan television Best Singer regional awards		Won
