= Rafiq Shinwari =

Mohammad Rafiq Shinwari محمد رفیق شینواری
- Genres: Ghazals; Classical music
- Occupation: Singer & Composer
- Labels: Various

Mohammad Rafiq Shinwari (Pashto: محمد رفیق شینواری) was a singer and composer of Pashto music in Pakistan. Though he also tried his luck with Pashto poetry and wrote a few poems as well but it was his compositions for early Pashto movies that earned him a big name in this field.

A disciple of Abdul Sattar Bacha, he was brought to Bacha's abode by his mother as a child in the late 1940s from Nangarhar, Afghanistan. Rafiq Shinwari started his career as a Qawali singer at Radio Pakistan Peshawar Studio in 1961. Subsequently he became a household name among the Pashtun population of both Afghanistan and Pakistan in the 1970s and 1980s. He primarily sang the Sufi poetry of Hamza Shinwari and Rahman Baba. Himself a Sufi by heart, Ustad Shinwari used to sing in a rare husky voice, which would leave his audience in a state of trance. As a music director some of his Pashto movies include Orbal, Ehsan, Qaidi, Dameena, Topak Zama Qanoon, Iqrar, Naway Da Yawai Shpai, and Khana Badosh.

Out of his two sons, namely, Shaifq and Ghulam Ali, the later committed suicide in 1988 for unknown reasons.

In 2004, the Rafiq Shinwari Ulasi award was established in his memory.

== Links to some audio and video songs ==
- Frontier Post article
- Pashto Songs of Rafiq Shinwari
- Sufi Songs of Rafiq Shinwari
