= Pashto music =

Music of the Pashtun people

Pashto music (ستا د مینې په رڼا کې شو روښانه هر میدان،

== Genres ==
=== Tappa ===
Tappa (Pashto: ټپه) is the oldest and most popular genre of the Pashto poetry. The Tappa is a composition of two unequal meters, in which the first line is shorter than the succeeding one, yet it reflects all human feelings and aspirations elegantly. Be it laborers, peasants, or women, all sentiments find expression in the Tappa. It is also common among the Pashtuns that a boy of school age would sing it, the elders in their hujrahs, or the women in their home and Godar alike. It is the only song sung in the time of grief and on the occasion of marriage. In music it is sung with the traditional Afghan musical instruments rubab and mangai. Tappa has up to 16 different models of harmony and is sung with full orchestra. In hujrah it is sung with rubab and sitar.

=== Charbeta ===
Charbetta is another popular genre, which consists of an epic poem with special rhythms. There are four kinds of Charbettas. Normally, it is a poem of four lines but might also have six or eight lines. All aspects of life are discussed in it. That includes the heroic deeds and heroism of legendary figures and sometimes expresses romantic feelings. The tempo is usually very fast and is sung by two or more singers as part of a chorus in which one singer reads the first line while the others follow the remaining. The singing or recitation of a Charbetta is called Tang Takore. Traditionally Charbetta is started just after the finishing of a Tappa.

=== Neemakai ===
Neemakai (Pashto: نيمکۍ) has many different forms and normally women compose it. It is usually very short (1 to 3 lines). The first lines are repeated in the middle of the song and Tappa is usually added according to the subject and circumstances. Most of these songs in Pashtun culture have been expressed in different areas about daily life and love.

=== Loba ===
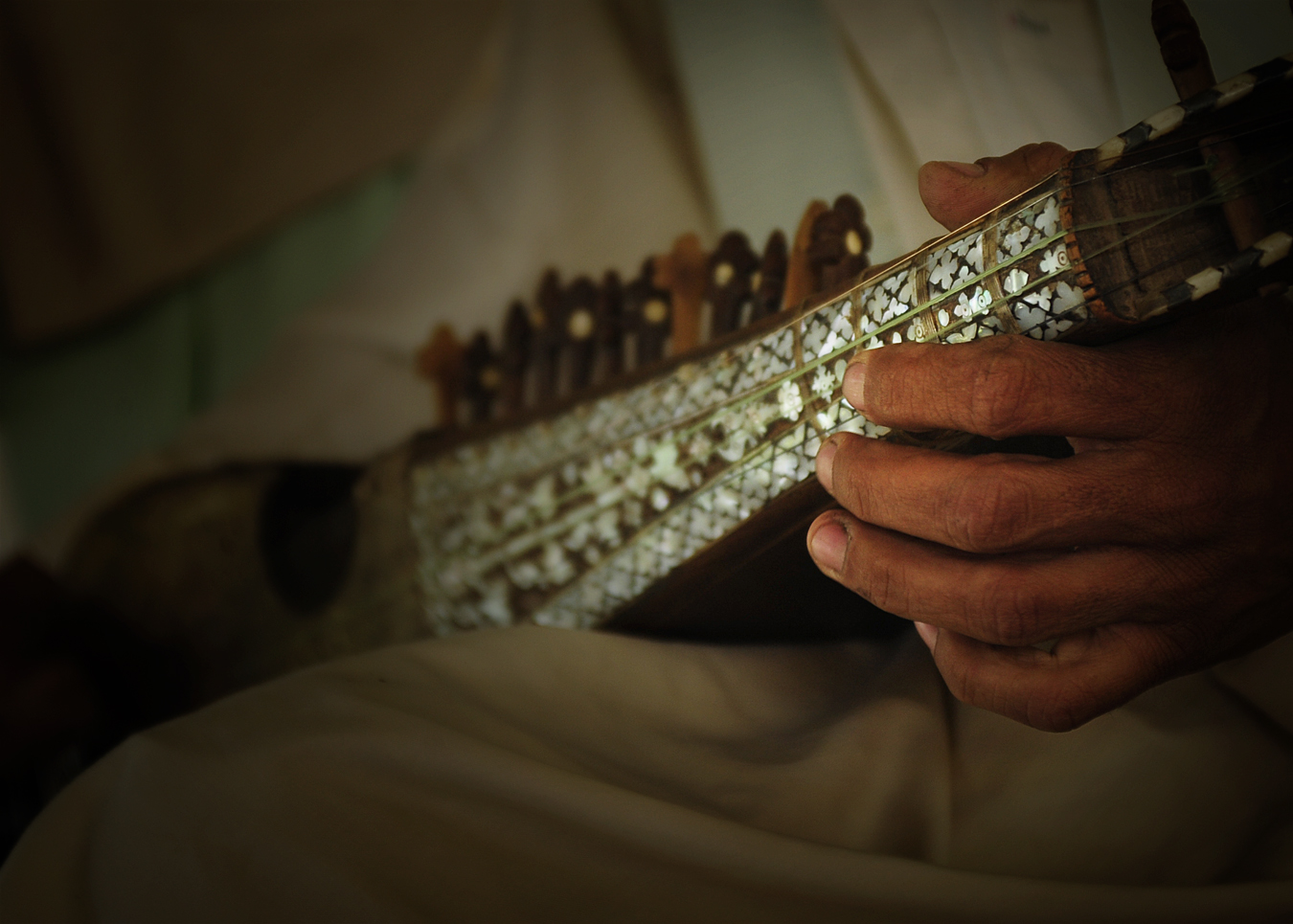
The rubab is often used in Pashto music

Loba is very popular among the masses and are added within Tappas occasionally. This is a form of folk music in which a story is told. It requires 2 or more persons who reply to each other in a poetic form. The two sides are usually the lover and the beloved (the man and woman).

=== Shaan ===
Shaan is sung during happy occasions such as marriages or the birth of a child, and is sung in private congregations and social gatherings.

=== Badala ===
Badala is a professional form of folk music and consists of an epic poem or a ballad. Instruments used include the rubab, harmonium, mungey or tabla. In Badala, tribal traditions are the main theme as well as heroism, tragedies and romance. Badala consists of variations, because each couplet is varied in rhythms from the others. It is sung traditionally at night.

=== Rubayi ===
Rubayi is a Pashto form of a Ghazal. The Rubayis of Rehman Baba are popular among the masses and is sung before the starting of Badala. As with the Ghazals, the Rubayi have been heavily influenced by Arabic, Persian and Turkic poetry.

=== Takki ===
Whilst not strictly speaking a literary form, Takki are a common form of entertainment in large gatherings. Two contestants take turns to extemporaneously deliver verses attacking the other, not unlike a rap battle. This is sometimes also called Hujooh or Lughat, and is more common in the southern districts of KPK and the areas across the border, such as Khost.

== Composers and performers ==
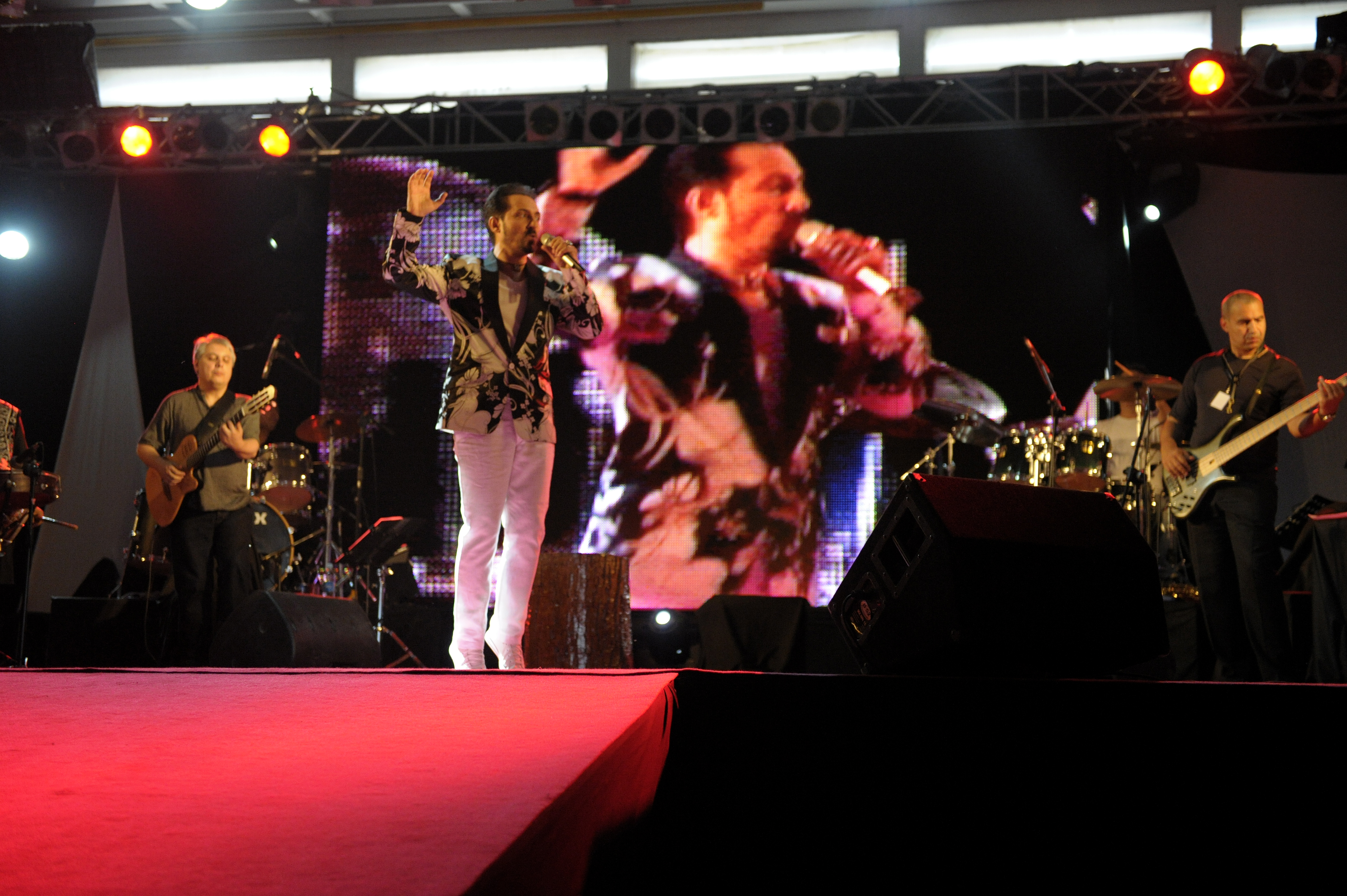
Farhad Darya performing at a concert in Kabul, Afghanistan.

- Haroon Bacha
- Awalmir
- Sardar Ali Takkar
- Obaidullah Jan Kandarai
- Nashenas
- Naghma
- Farhad Darya
- Zeek Afridi
- Nazia Iqbal
- Rahim Shah
- Ahmad Wali
- Khyal Muhammad
- Gulzar Alam
- Zeb and Haniya
- Sajid & Zeeshan
- Ismail and Junaid
- Jehangir Aziz Hayat
- Ghazala Javed
- Homayoun Sakhi
- Sannan Mahboob (Rubab)
- Enayat Ullah

== Traditional Pashtun dance ==
- Attan
- Khattak Dance

== See also ==
- Pashtun culture
- List of Pashto-language poets
