= Khyal Muhammad =

Pashtun singer

Ustad Khyal Muhammad Khan Afridi
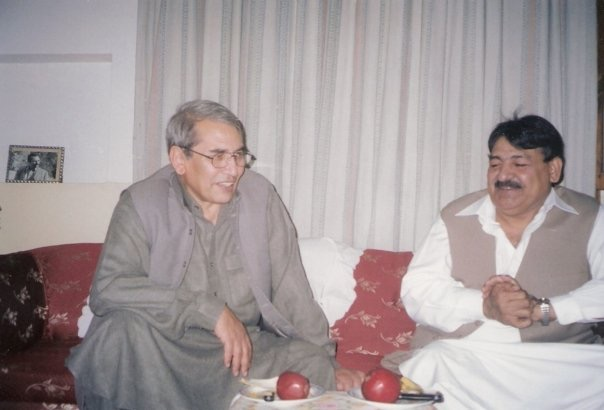
- Khyal Mohammed (right) with Kabir Stori

Background information
- Born: Khyal Muhammad Khan Afridi; 5 January 1946 (age 80); Peshawar, British Raj
- Genres: Pop; Dance; Ghazals; Classical music
- Occupations: Singer, composer, human rights activist, peace ambassador
- Instruments: Harmonium, keyboard, guitar
- Years active: 1980–present
- Label: Various

Ustad Khyal Muhammad (Pashto: استاد خیال محمد, born 1946) is a Pashtun singer from Khyber Pakhtunkhwa, Pakistan. He has appeared regularly on television, usually singing ghazals and in movies.

== Career ==
Khyal Mohammad belongs to the Afridi tribe of Pashtuns. He is originally from Tirah in Khyber Tribal District. He was born in Peshawar on 5 January 1946 to a musical family. His brother Saif Ul-Maluk, a popular singer in the 1960s, often performed on Radio Pakistan's Peshawar center. Saif introduced him to the radio station, where he first performed in 1958, aged 13. However, for the next ten years he mainly restricted himself to playing instruments such as the tabla and the harmonium. In the late 1960s, he began singing and recording ghazals, traditional Pashto poems, a daring gamble since the music scene at that time was dominated by folk music. His style soon became popular in Peshawar and the NWFP.

After establishing his name on the local radio, in 1973–74 Khyal Mohammad appeared in his first movie, Dara-i-Khyber, one of the first "Pollywood" Pashto movies. This gave his career a kick-start, and since then he has appeared in many other movies. As his popularity continued to grow, he often toured in Afghanistan, Europe, the UAE and the USA. Over the years he has recorded a volume of music, and has also appeared as a playback singer in many movies, winning many awards. He has been called the Elvis Presley of Pashto music.

== Musical style ==
Khyal Muhammad renders ghazal songs in a traditional manner, choosing pieces that combine mysticism, romance and philosophy, usually with an undertone of melancholy. His voice has impressive range, but is always fully under control. Radio, television and movie producers have paid tribute to his professionalism and ability to produce flawless performances with minimal rehearsal. Zahoor Khan Zaiby, a Pakhtoon composer of Balochi and Sindhi tunes, says "Lala is an expert at harnessing the mood of the moment and the poetry through his voice. The songs from his films are considered Pashto anthems." One of his album is named as "Sawee Daghuna"

== Awards ==
In 1991, Khyal was given the National Film Award for playback singer. Khyal Muhammad has received a Pride of Performance presidential award, two National Awards and a gold medal from Pakistan Television Corporation presented by Madame Noor Jehan. In April 2009, Chief Minister Ameer Haider Khan Hoti presented a cheque for Rs one million to Khyal Muhammad on behalf of the provincial government for his services to Pushto music and ghazals. On 1 November 2016, he was awarded with the Mir Bacha Khan medal by Afghan government in a gathering at Nishtar Hall Peshawar. In 2022 Radio Pakistan, Peshawar conferred Khyal Muhammad with the 'Mehdi Hassan diamond jubilee independence award'.
