= List of Afghans =

The following is a list of notable Afghan people, which includes all the ethnic groups of the modern state of Afghanistan. Afghanistan has gone through territorial changes. This list generally excludes Ethnic Pashtuns who originate from regions that were not controlled by Afghanistan at the time, though there are exceptions for certain figures who are prominent to Pashtuns.

== Monarchs ==
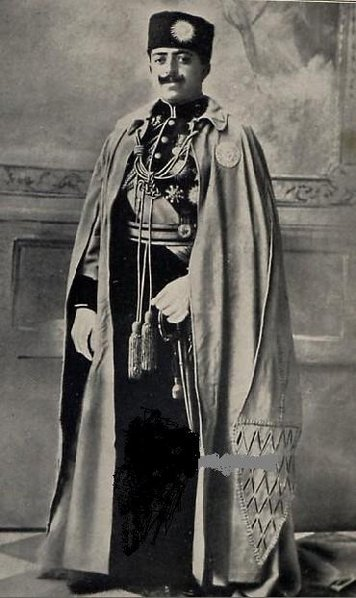
Amanullah Khan

- Humayun (reigned 26 December 1530 – 17 May 1540) Second Mughal emperor in India.
- Demetrius I of Bactria (c. 200 – c. 180 BCE) King of Bactria
- Eucratides I (reigned 171–145 BC) King of the Bactrian Empire
- Menander I (reigned 165/155–130 BC) Indo-Greek king
- Mahmud of Ghazni (reigned 998 – 30 April 1030) Sultan of the Ghaznavid Empire
- Ghiyath al-Din Muhammad (reigned 1163 – 11 February 1203) Sultan of the Ghurid Empire
- Muhammad of Ghor (reigned 1173–1202) Sultan of the Ghurid Sultanate
- Muhammad Shah (reigned 27 September 1719 – 26 April 1748) 13th Mughal Emperor
- Abu Sa'id Mirza (reigned Samarkand: 1451–1469, Herat: 1459–1469) Ruler of the Timurd empire
- Alauddin Khalji (reigned 19 July 1296 – 4 January 1316) Turco-Afghan Ruler of Delhi Sultanate
- Ulugh Beg II (reign 1461–1502) Timiurd Ruler of Kabul and Ghazni
- Sayed Kayan Sayed Nadir Shah Al-Hussaini Kayani who was known as Sayed Kayan was a prominent Islamic philosopher, religious and political figure.
- Abul-Qasim Babur Mirza Timiurd Ruler of khorasan
- Sher Shah Suri (1537 – 22 May 1545) Founder of the Suri Empire in India,
- Sultan Husayn Bayqara (reigned 1469 – 4 May 1506) Amir of the Timurid Empire
- Ahmad Shah Durrani (1747–1772) was the founder of the Durrani Empire and is regarded as the founder of the modern state of Afghanistan
- Jalal-ud-din Khalji (reigned 13 June 1290 - 19 July 1296) Founder of the Khalji dynasty, 12th Ruler of the Delhi Sultanate
- Kalu Khan Yousufzai - Yousufzai Afghan monarch of Khyber Pakhtunkhwa. known for the Battle of Malandari Pass (1586)

== Presidents ==
- Ashraf Ghani – served as the fifth president of Afghanistan and as the second and final president of the Islamic Republic of Afghanistan
- Burhanuddin Rabbani
- Daoud Khan
- Hamid Karzai
- Mohammad Najibullah
- Nur Muhammad Taraki

== Politicians and diplomats ==
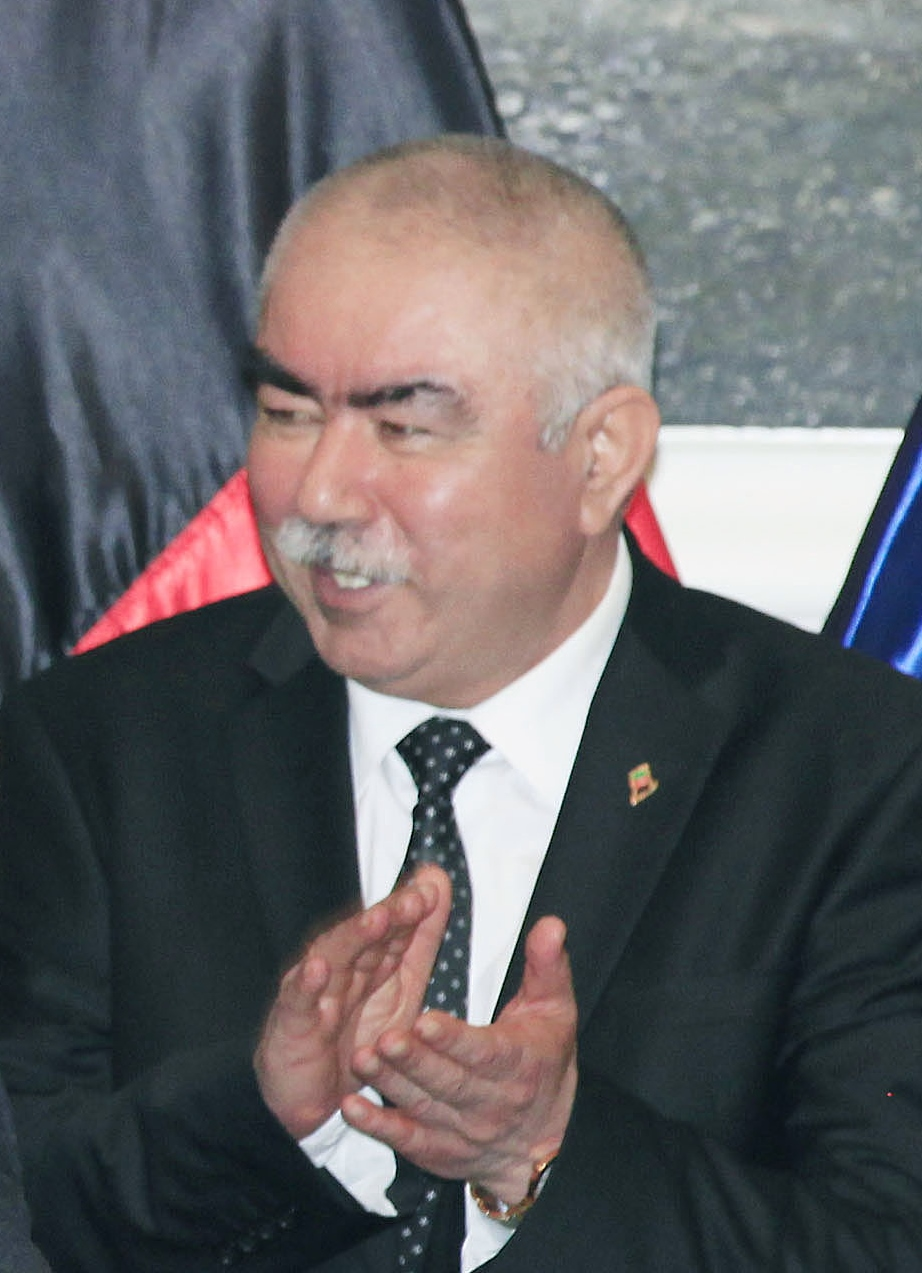
Abdul Rashid Dostum

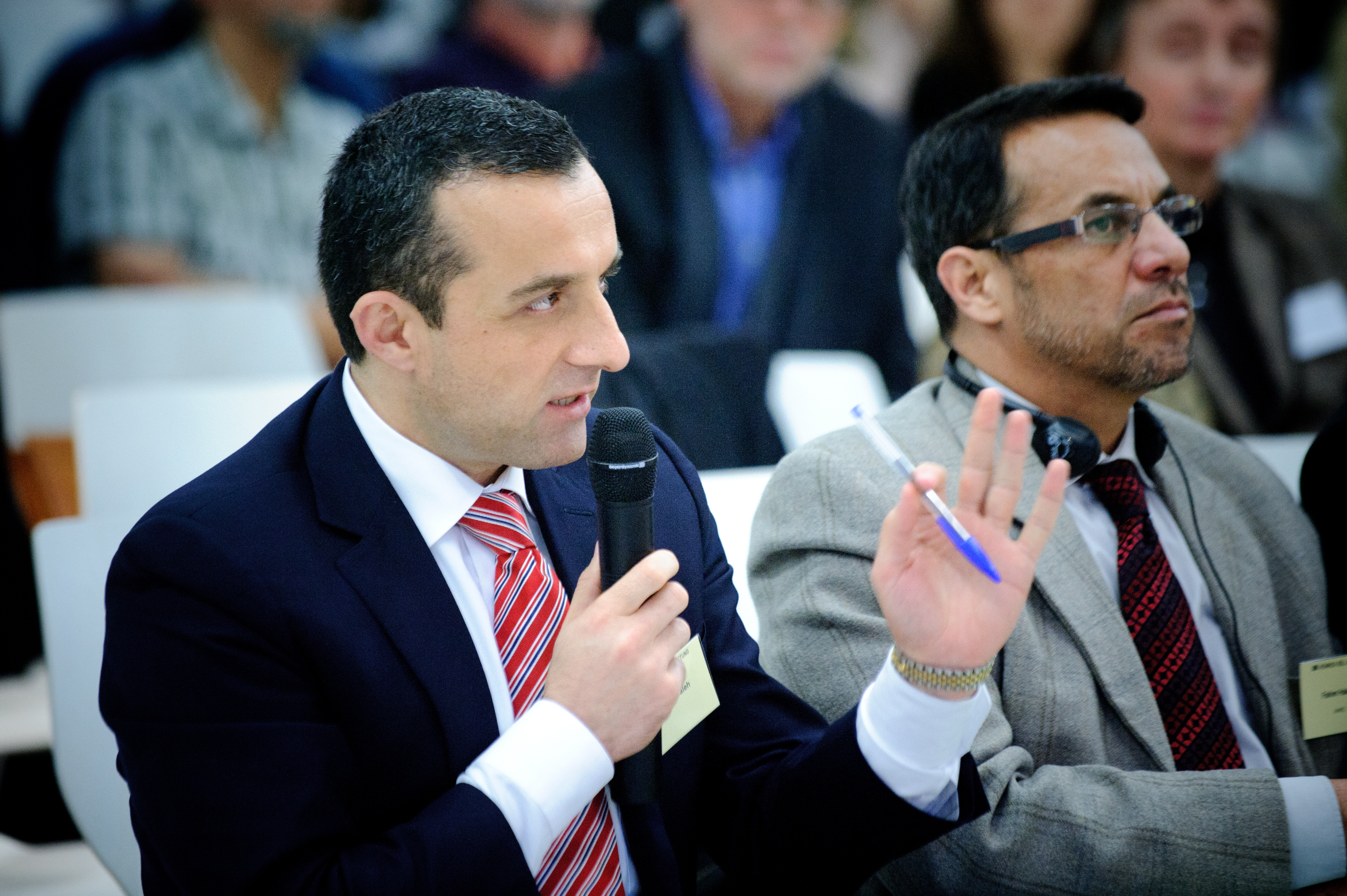
Amrullah Saleh

- Mohammad Shafiq Hamdam, civil right activists, political and international affairs analyst and tech expert.
- Muhammad Yunus Nawandish, was the Mayor of Kabul from after his appointment by Afghan President Hamid Karzai in January 2010
- Mohammad Siddiq Chakari
- Sayed Mansur Naderi Former Vice-president of the Islamic Republic of Afghanistan
- Abdul Ahmad Zahedi Niqala
- Sadat Mansoor Naderi, Former State Minister for Peace
- Wahid Omar
- Amrullah Saleh the second Panjshir resistance
- Rafael Pinhasi Israeli politician
- Mahmud Tarzi Afghan politician and intellectual, known as founder of Afghan journalism
- Mohammad Ibraheem Khwakhuzhi
- Zalmay Khalilzad Afghan-American diplomat and foreign policy expert
- Rangin Dadfar Spanta
- Gulbuddin Hekmatyar
- Ali Ahmad Khan Afghan politician and self proclaimed Emir of Afghanistan for a few weeks
- Ismael Balkhi Hazara political leader and reformist
- Abdul Rahman Pazhwak diplomat, scholar and poet
- Abdul Qadir (Afghan communist) Afghan politician, diplomat, and military officer
- Mohammed Aziz Khan Afghan prince and diplomat
- Abdur Rahim Khan (governor) Afghan governor of Herat
- Abdul Rashid Dostum Afghan warlord
- Farkhunda Zahra Naderi, Former MP and Senior Advisor to President Ashraf Ghani
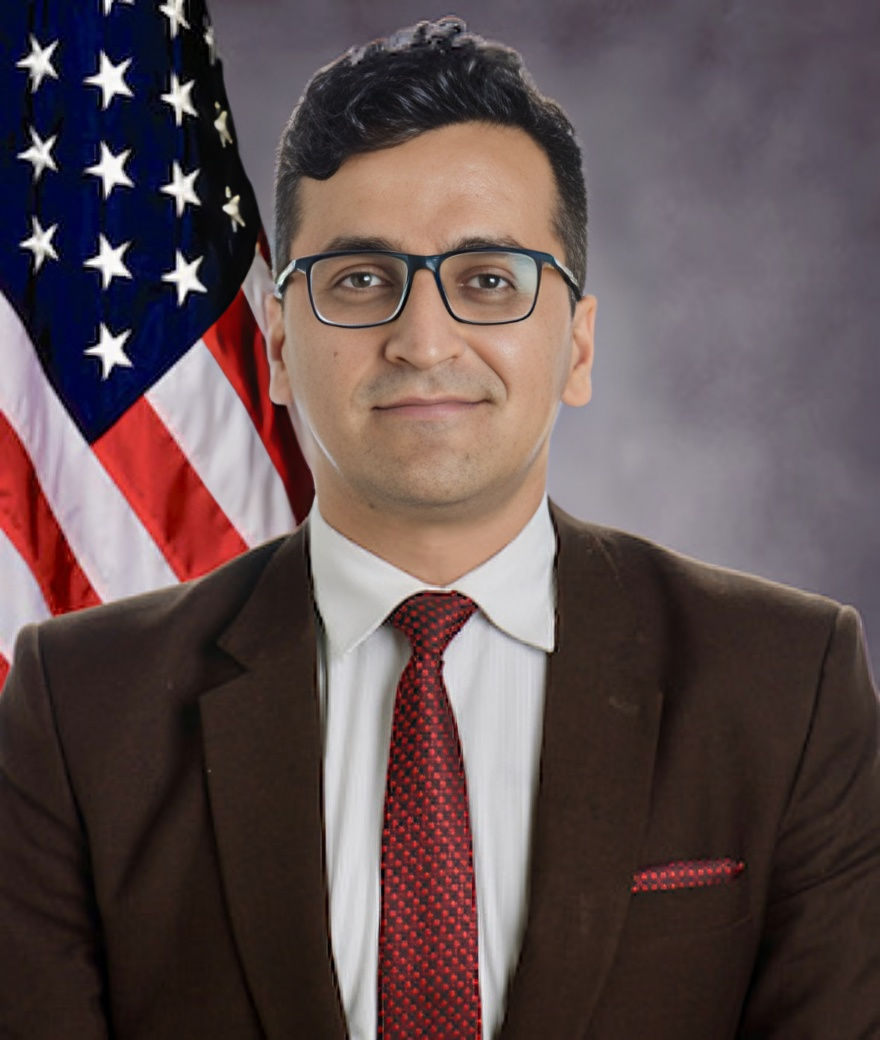
- Mohammad Shafiq Hamdam
  Juma Khan Hamdard governor of Paktia Province from 2007 to 2015
- Sayed Mohammad Ali Jawid Afghan politician
- Khairullah Khairkhwa current Afghan Minister of Information and Culture and a former Minister of the Interior.
- Dawood Laghmani Afghan politician
- Abdur Rahman Mahmudi, medical doctor and politician
- Kubra Noorzai Afghan politician. She was the first woman to become a government minister in the country.
- Nasima Razmyar Afghan-Finnish politician, elected to the Finnish Parliament in 2015
- Mohammad Nabi Omari Afghan politician, governor of Khost province and held for nearly twelve years in extrajudicial detention in the United States Guantanamo Bay
- Abdul Ali Mazari political leader of the Hezb-e Wahdat party
- Khushnood Nabizada Chief of Staff to State Ministry for Peace (SMP)
- Ahmad ibn Nizam al-Mulk born in Balkh, Persian vizier of the Seljuq Empire and then the Abbasid Caliphate.
- Shah Mahmud Khan Prime Minister of Afghanistan from May 1946 to 7 September 1953, under King Mohammed Zahir Shah's monarchy
- Abdul Hadi Dawi Afghan poet, diplomat and government official.
- Naqibullah Orya Khail, leader of Hezb-e-Jawanan Musalman Afghanistan

== Military figures ==
- Kamal al-Din Gurg (died late 1315 or early 1316), general of the Delhi Sultanate ruler Alauddin Khalji.
- Adham Khan general of Akbar the Great, third Mughal empire
- Mullah Omar Mujahideen leader, co-founder of the Taliban and served as its first leader
- Ahmad Shah Massoud military commander - “National Hero of Afghanistan”
- Jalaluddin Haqqani Afghan insurgent commander who founded the Haqqani network
- Ala al-Dawla Mirza Timurid prince and a grandson of the Central Asian ruler Shah Rukh
- Bairam Khan military commander and commander-in-chief of the Mughal army
- Wazir Akbar Khan Afghan prince, general and Emir
- Habibullāh Kalakāni leader of the Saqqawists
- Abdul Qadir (Afghan communist) military officer in the Afghan Air Force
- Commander Shafi Hazara ethnic Hazara military commander in Afghanistan
- Kabir Andarabi military official
- Sayed Jafar Naderi Military Official and former governor of Baghlan province.
- Abdul Rasul Sayyaf Mujahideen commander
- Dadullah Taliban's senior military commander in Afghanistan until his death in 2007
- Obaidullah Akhund Defence Minister in the Afghan Taliban government of 1996–2001
- Amin Wardak major Afghan Mujahideen leader
- Abdul Raziq Achakzai Afghan Army Lieutenant General and Police Chief, considered to be one of the most powerful security officials in Afghanistan for the last few years of his life
- Tahir ibn Husayn General and Governor of Khurasan during the Abbasid caliphate
- Masrur al-Balkhi senior military officer in the late-9th century Abbasid Caliphate
- Azad Khan Afghan military commander
- Sardar Shah Wali Khan political and military figure in Afghanistan
- Mohammad Akram, vice Chief of Staff of the Afghan National Army; died in a suicide attack in 2005.
- Mohammad Fahim (1957–2014), Marshal in the Afghan National Army
- Khoshal Sadat Pashtun military officer

== Scientists ==
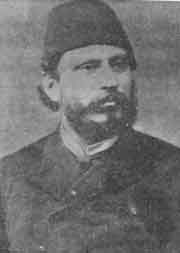
Jamal ad-Din al-Afghani

- Jamal ad-Din al-Afghani – philosopher
- Abolfadl Harawi the astronomer of Herat
- Ahmad ibn Farrokh physician of 12th century
- Hedayat Amin Arsala – economist
- Mohammad Amin Fatemi – physician
- Habib Mangal – physician
- Abdul Ahad Mohmand – astronaut, he became the first Afghan citizen and the fourth Muslim to visit outer space, he also made Pashto the 4th spoken language in space.
- Abdul Karim Mustaghni
- Muhammad ibn Yusuf al-Harawi the physician of 15th century Herat
- M. Ishaq Nadiri – professor of economics
- Ghulam Faroq Nijrabi – physician
- Abbas Noyan – engineer
- Hamidullah Qalandarzai – engineer
- Mohammad Qayoumi – engineer; president of San Jose State University
- Daud Shah Saba – geologist
- Sima Samar – physician
- Habiba Sarobi – hematologist
- Nazif Shahrani – professor of anthropology
- Ishaq Shahryar – solar energy inventor
- Kabir Stori – psychologist
- Zemaryalai Tarzi – archeologist
- Abdul Qayum Tutakhail – physician
- Ghulam Sediq Wardak – inventor
- Sediq Afghan – mathematician
- Abu Ma'shar al-Balkhi (787-886 AD) – astrologer
- Abu Zayd al-Balkhi (850–934 AD) – geographer and mathematician
- Al-Muqanna (-783 AD) – chemist, also known for leading an Islamic revolt and claiming to be a prophet
- Al-Sijzi (945-1020 AD) – Muslim astronomer, mathematician, and astrologer

== Entrepreneurs ==
- Noor Akbari
- Sadat Mansoor Naderi
- Fahim Hashimy
- Safi Rauf
- Fatema Akbari
- Ehsan Bayat
- Sherkhan Farnood
- Fauzia Gailani, Gilani ethnic Pashtun
- Mahmud Karzai
- Roya Mahboob
- Sher Khan Nashir
- Saad Mohseni
- Kamila Sidiqi
- Khushnood Nabizada

== Historians ==
- Abdul Rauf Benawa Chronicler
- Abd al-Razzaq Samarqandi – chronicler and Islamic scholar
- Abdul Hai Habibi (1910–1984)
- Abdul Shakoor Rashad (1921–2004)
- Abu Mansour al-Hosein ibn Muhammad al-Marghani
- Akram Assem
- Faiz Mohammad Katib Hazara
- Ghulam Mohammad Ghobar (1898–1978)
- Hamid Naweed
- Khvandamir
- Omara Khan Massoudi – geographer, historian
- Zalmay A. Gulzad

== Actors and film directors ==
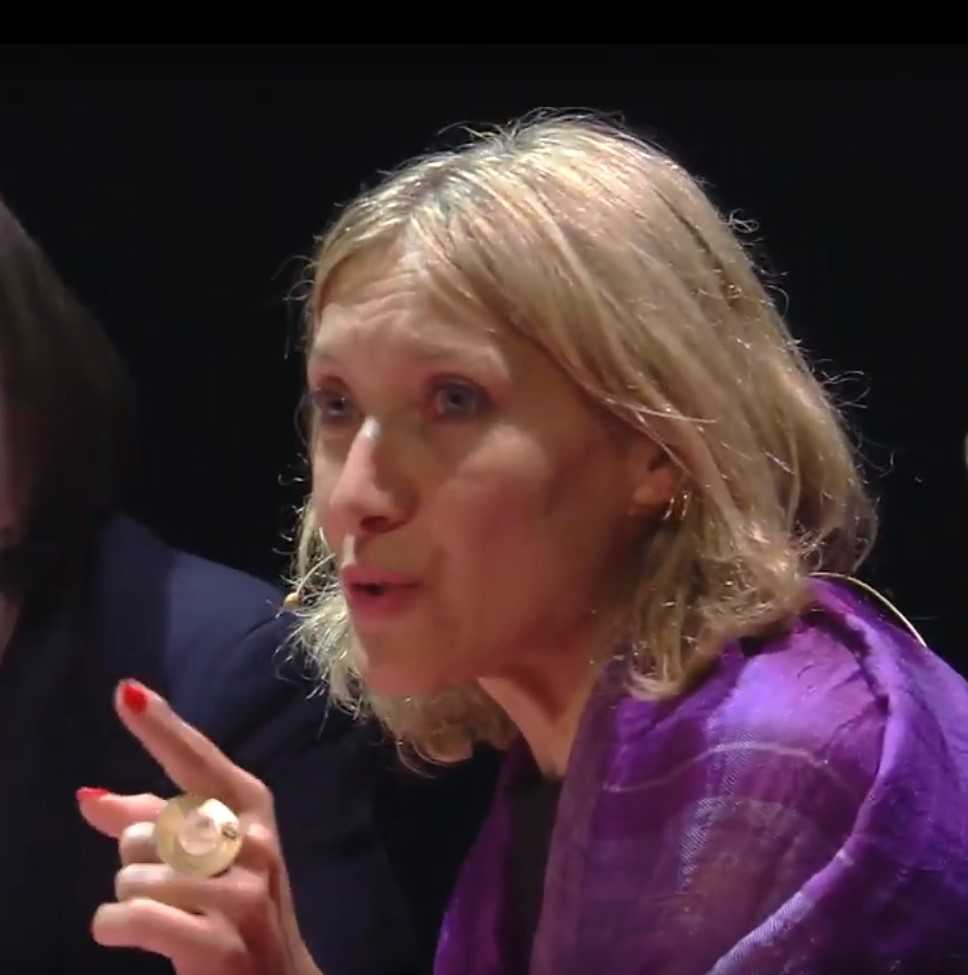
Nelofer Pazira

- Latif Ahmadi – director of Afghan Film, Afghanistan's state-run film company
- Leena Alam – actress
- Siddiq Barmak (born 1962) – directed the drama film Osama (2003)
- Abdul Ghafoor Breshna – painter, music composer, poet and film director
- Sonia Nassery Cole – directed the drama film The Black Tulip (2010)
- Zohre Esmaeli (born 1985) – model, author, designer
- Fahim Fazli – actor, author, modification speaker, cultural technical advisor for US Marines
- Azita Ghanizada, actress
- Marina Golbahari
- Haji Kamran
- Kader Khan (1937–2018), Bollywood film actor and producer
- Ahmad Khan Mahmidzada
- Mamnoon Maqsoodi (born 1966)
- Celina Jaitly, actress in Indian cinema
- Shakila, Indian actress
- Anisa Wahab
- Abdul Wahid Nazari (born 1953)
- Nelofer Pazira
- Soosan Firooz
- Arshi Khan, model and celebrity
- Atiq Rahimi – French-Afghan filmmaker, writer
- Salim Shaheen
- Kawa Ada
- Awesta Zarif – actress, director, singer

== Writers (including journalists) ==
- Qais Akbar Omar (born in 1982 in Kabul, Afghanistan) writer, journalist, memoirist
- Abdul Khaliq Hussaini journalist, activist
- Abu Mansur al-Azhari (895–980) lexicographer, philologist and grammarian of Arabic; prominent philogist of his time
- Abu Ubaid al-Qasim bin Salam (770–838) philologist and the author of many standard works on lexicography, Qur’anic sciences
- Ahmad Javeed Ahwar
- Aziz Ullah Haidari journalist
- Chékéba Hachemi Afghan feminist and writer
- Dr. Hafiz Sahar (1928–1982)
- Fariba Nawa (born 1973)
- Gul Mohamad Zhowandai
- Hafizullah Khaled
- Homeira Qaderi
- Khaled Hosseini (born 1965)
- Khushnood Nabizada, journalist and entrepreneur
- Leila Christine Nadir
- Mahmud Tarzi (1865–1933)
- Mohammad Haider Zhobal history writer
- Mohammad Jan Fana (born 1932)
- Nelofer Pazira
- Nelufar Hedayat
- Qiamuddin Khadim
- Rahnaward Zaryab
- Sakena Yacoobi
- Sayed Ihsanuddin Taheri
- Sultan Munadi (1976–2009)
- Tamim Ansary
- Yalda Hakim, journalist

=== Poets ===
- Abdul Bari Jahani Afghan poet, most notable work is the national anthem of the Islamic Republic of Afghanistan
- Abdul Rahman Pazhwak (1919–1995)
- Abu al-Fath al-Busti (942–1010)
- Ali-Shir Nava'i (1441–1501) poet, writer, politician, linguist, mystic and painter
- Ghani Khan (1914–1996)
- Hafizullah Khaled
- Hakim Sanai (1080–1131)
- Hamza Baba (1907–1994) Sage of Herat, the great Sufi mystic of 11th century
- Kabir Stori (1942–2006)
- Khalilullah Khalili (1907–1987)
- Khushal Khan Khattak (1613–1689)
- Khwaja Abdullah Ansari
- Latif Nazemi (born 1947)
- Layla Sarahat Rushani (died 2004)
- Mahmūd Tarzī (1830–1900)
- Makhfi Badakhshi
- Matiullah Turab
- Mohammad Hashem Zamani
- Nadia Anjuman
- Nazo Tokhi
- Parween Pazhwak (born 1967)
- Pir Roshan (1525–1582/1585)
- Qahar Asi (1956–1994)
- Rabia Balkhi from the city of Balkh, possibly the first female poet of Persian literature
- Rahman Baba (1650–1715)
- Jalāl ad-Dīn Mohammad Rūmī the great Sufi mystic and poet of 13th century
- Sana Safi
- Unsuri 10-11th century Persian poet, from Balkh
- Wasef Bakhtari

== Artists ==
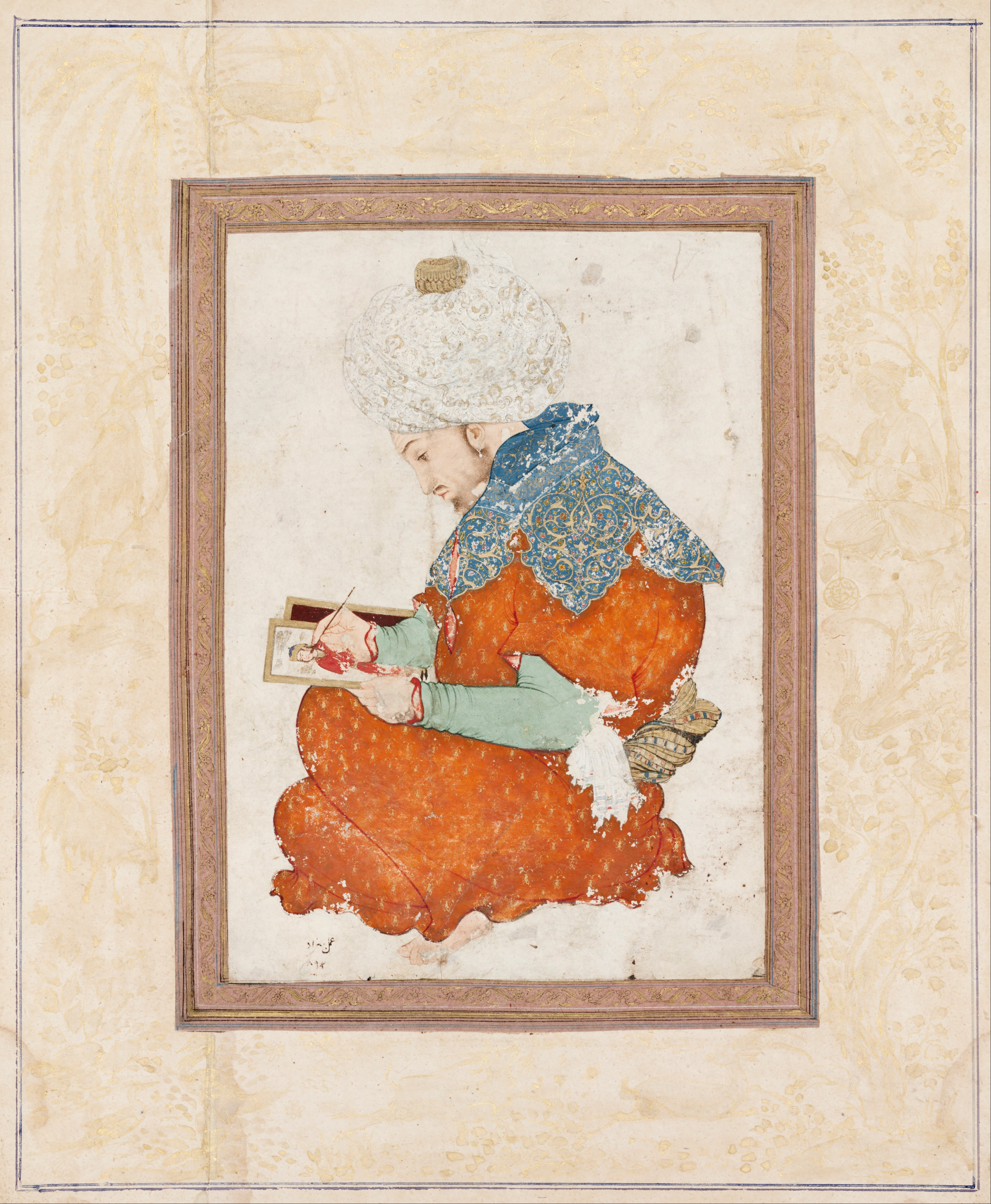
Kamāl ud-Dīn Behzād

- Abdul Ghafoor Breshna – one of Afghanistan's most talented artists
- Ali-Shir Nava'i (1441–1501)
- Dust Muhammad – born in Herat, Persian painter of miniatures, calligrapher, and art historian. Disciple of Kamāl ud-Dīn Behzād
- Kamāl ud-Dīn Behzād (1455–1535) – painter
- Lida Abdul – video artist and performance artist
- Malina Suliman – graffiti artist, metalworker, and painter
- Mariam Ghani – visual artist, photographer, filmmaker
- Shamsia Hassani – graffiti artist, a fine arts lecturer, and the associate professor of Drawing and Anatomy Drawing at the Kabul University

== Religious figures ==
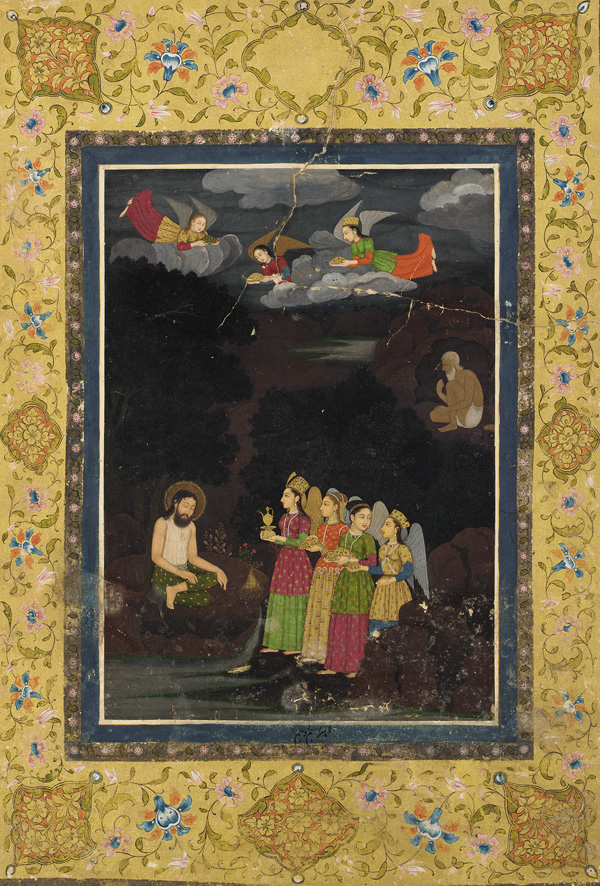
- Ibrahim ibn Adham
- Abdullah Ansari the religious saint of Herat in 11th century
- Ibrahim ibn Adham – early ascetic Sufi saint
- Ibn Hibban Scholar of Hadith
- Ibn Karram 9th century Islamic scholar of Balkh
- Asif Mohseni – Afghan Twelver Shi'a Marja'
- Muqatil ibn Sulayman – scholar of Islam, wrote earliest, possibly first commentaries of the Quran
- Hiwi al-Balkhi – 9th century exegete and critic of the bible
- Ali Hujwiri – 11th-century sunni Muslim mystic, theologian and preacher.
- Shahid Balkhi – Persian theologian, philosopher, poet and Sufi. Famous Persian poet Rudaki has a poem in Balkhi's elegy.
- Ali al-Qari – Islamic scholar
- Haji Dost Muhammad Qandhari – Afghan Sufi master
- Sheikh Mohammad Rohani – Sufi cleric born around 1220 AD
- Abobaker Mojadidi – spiritual Muslim leader and socio-political activist
- Ahmed Gailani – was the leader of the Qadiriyyah Sufi order in Afghanistan
- Mirza Muhammad Ismail – Afghan religious scholar and the first convert to the Ahmadiyya faith
- Sultan Balkhi – 14th century Muslim saint, known for preaching Islam in Bengal
- Ibn Hibban – scholar, Muhaddith, historian and author of well-known works
- Malak Yousaf Afghan – primogenitor of the Qazyan family

== Sportspeople ==
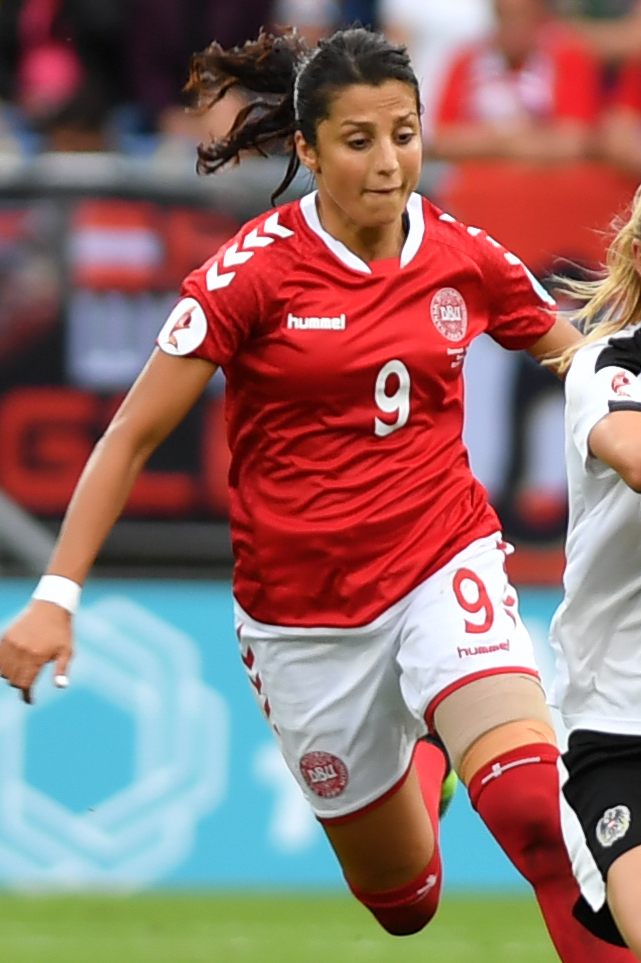
Nadia Nadim

- Asghar Afghan – cricketer, Afghanistan's former captain and ended his career with the highest T20I wins as a captain.
- Dawlat Zadran – cricketer
- Farid Basharat – UFC Fighter
- Gulbadin Naib – cricketer
- Hamid Hassan – cricketer
- Hazratullah Zazai – cricketer, led Afghanistan to the highest T20I score of 278/3
- Hussain Sadiqi – Afghan Australian martial artist
- Jan Alam Hassani – volleyballer
- Ashraf Hussainzada – football referee
- Javed Ahmadi – cricketer
- Javid Basharat – UFC Fighter
- Jeff Bronkey – Afghan-American former Major League Baseball pitcher
- Khaleqdaad Noori – cricketer
- Mohammad Nabi – cricketer, 1st in Allrounder rankings.
- Moshtagh Yaghoubi – Afghan-born Finnish footballer
- Mujeeb Ur Rahman – cricketer
- Mustafa Amini – Afghan-Australian footballer
- Nadia Nadim – footballer
- Nasrat Haqparast – UFC Fighter
- Nasratullah Nasrat – cricketer
- Qaher Hazrat – cyclist
- Qais Ahmad – cricketer
- Raees Ahmadzai – cricketer
- Rahmanullah Gurbaz – cricketer
- Rashid Khan – cricketer, the ICC Men's T20I Player of the Decade
- Rohullah Nikpai – first Afghanistan's Taekwondo Olympic winner of 2008 and 2012
- Said Karimulla Khalili – Russian-Afghan biathlete
- Sandjar Ahmadi – footballer
- Shamila Kohestani – footballer, and former captain of the Afghanistan women's national football team
- Shamsuddin Amiri – footballer
- Siyar Bahadurzada – UFC fighter
- Yamin Ahmadzai – cricketer

== Musicians (including composers) ==
- Abdul Rahim Sarban
- Ahmad Wali
- Ahmad Zahir
- Aryana Sayeed
- Dawood Sarkhosh
- Farhad Darya
- Hangama
- Latif Nangarhari
- Meira Omar
- Miri Maftun
- Mozhdah Jamalzadah
- Naghma
- Naim Popal
- Nainawaz – artist, poet and composer; composed some of the most iconic pieces in Afghan popular music
- Nashenas – one of the oldest surviving musicians from Afghanistan
- Nasrat Parsa
- Omar Akram – Grammy Award-winning Afghan-American recording artist, composer and pianist
- Rahim Bakhsh
- Rukhshana – one of the first Afghan female singers
- Soosan Firooz – actress and rapper
- Ubaidullah Jan – Pashto singer

== Female activists ==
- Adela Mohseni
- Anahita Ratebzad (1931–2014)
- Aryana Sayeed – women's rights activist and famous singer
- Asila Wardak
- Farida Azizi – advocate for peace and women's rights.
- Farkhunda Zahra Naderi – women Rights Activist
- Fatema Akbari
- Fawzia Koofi
- Jamila Afghani – founder of Noor Educational and Capacity Development Organization (NECDO)
- Khadija Ahrari – helped give women the right to vote
- Laila Haidari (born 1978)
- Malalai Joya (born 1978)
- Manizha Wafeq
- Mariam Ghani – artist and advocate for women's rights
- Marzia Basel – advocate for women's education
- Masuma Esmati Wardak
- Rona Tarin – Afghan politician and women's rights activist
- Roqia Abubakr
- Safia Ahmed-jan – women's rights activist
- Sima Samar – human rights, democracy, first Afghan's Noble award candidate
- Sitara Achakzai – women's rights activist

== Others ==
- Abdul Khaliq Hazara – assassin
- Abdul Khaliq Hussaini (born 1977)
- Abdul Latif Pedram – professor of literature
- Abdul Majid Zabuli (1896–1998) – founder of Bank-e-Melli Afghanistan
- Afghana – tribal chief or prince of Pashtuns, traditionally considered the progenitor of modern-day Pashtuns.
- Ahmad Massoud (born 1989)
- Al-Farabi (872–950) early Islamic philosopher and polymath; also known as Alpharabius in the west
- Azizullah Royesh – social activist
- Baysunghur – prince from the house of Timurids
- Durkhanai Ayubi – Afghan-Australian food expert, restaurateur, and prize-winning cookbook author
- Faiz Ahmad – Marxist–Leninist Afghan revolutionary and the founding leader of the Afghanistan Liberation Organization (ALO)
- Ghulam Muhammad Tarzi – soldier, poet, and military leader
- Khalid ibn Barmak – born in Balkh, 8th century Soldier and administrator
- Khwaja Usman – Mughal opponent, Baro-Bhuyan chieftain
- Malalai of Maiwand – national folk hero of Afghanistan also known as "Afghan Jeanne d'Arc"; rallied the Pashtun fighters to fight against the British invaders in the Battle of Maiwand causing an Afghan victory
- Mir Masjidi Khan (died 1841) – Afghan resistance leader
- Mohammad Sharif Razai – medical doctor and researcher
- Nur Jahan – Empress consort of Mughal Empire
- Qurban Ali Mirzaee, actor
- Razia Muradi (born 1995/1996) academic
- Robert Joffrey – born Anver Bey Abdullah Jaffa Khan to Afghan father and Italian mother; choreographer, dancer, director
- Roxana princess that Alexander the Great married, either born in Bactria (Balkh) or Sogodia
- Safi Rauf (born 1994)
- Sharbat Gula (born 1972)
- Trapusa and Bahalika – first two lay disciples of the Buddha
- Vida Mohammad – model
- Vida Samadzai – model
- Yoram Cohen – born to Afghan Jewish parents, director of Israel's internal security service "Shin Bet"
- Youssof Kohzad – writer, painter, playwright, artist, poet and actor
- Zablon Simintov – Afghan Jewish carpet trader and restaurateur; widely known for being thought as the last Jew remaining in Afghanistan
- Zallascht Sadat – model

== See also ==
- Demographics of Afghanistan
- Lists of people by nationality
- List of Hazara people
- List of Pashtuns
- List of Tajik people
