= List of Afghan singers =

This is a list of notable Afghan singers that have entered the industry, currently working or have left the industry.

== A ==
- Ahmad Wali
- Ahmad Zahir
- Aryana Sayeed
- Abdul Rahim Sarban
- Amir Jan Sabori
- Awalmir
- Asad Badie
- Aziz Herawi

== B ==
- Bakht Zamina
- Bazgul Badakhshi
- Beltoon
- Burka Band

== D ==
- Dawood Sarkhosh

== E ==
- Ehsan Aman
- Elaha Soroor

== F ==
- Farhad Darya
- Farid Rastagar
- Farid Zaland

== H ==
- Hangama
- Haidar Salim

== J ==
- Jalil Zaland
- Javed Amirkhil

== K ==
- Khyal Muhammad

== L ==
- Latif Nangarhari

== M ==
- Mohammad Din Zakhil
- Mozhdah Jamalzadah
- Mohammad Hussain Sarahang
- Mahwash
- Mohammad Hashem Cheshti
- Miri Maftun
- Khoshi Mahtab
- Mangal
- Mohammad Din Zakhil

== N ==
- Nasrat Parsa
- Naghma
- Nashenas
- Naim Popal
- Nainawaz

== P ==
- Parasto

== Q ==
- Qamar Gula
- Qader Eshpari

== R ==
- Rafiq Shinwari
- Rahim Mehryar
- Rahim Bakhsh
- Rezwan Munawar
- Rishad Zahir
- Rukhshana

== S ==
- Sardar Ali Takkar
- Shafiq Murid
- Shah Wali
- Soosan Firooz
- Shakeeb Hamdard
- Seeta Qasemi
- Soheila Zaland
- Saifo
- Seema Tarana

== T ==
- Tawab Arash

== U ==
- Ubaidullah Jan

== V ==
- Vahid Soroor

== W ==
- Wajiha Rastagar

== Z ==
- Zahir Howaida
