= Vahid Soroor =

Vahid Soroor وحید سرور
- Birth name: وحید سرور
- Born: 1971
- Origin: Afghanistan
- Genres: Pop
- Occupation: Singer
- Years active: 2000–present
- Website: http://www.VahidSoroor.com/

Vahid Soroor (Persian: وحید سرور; born 1971) is an Afghan singer.

Soroor was born in Kabul, Afghanistan, to two established cinema, theatre, TV and radio artist parents Mazida and Khan Agha Soroor, he caught on to music at an early age. At the age of eight he performed for school concerts at Said Noor Mohammad Shah Mina School in Karte-Nau. Vahid and his family moved to India in 1982, where he sang as the lead singer for his school in more than five large concerts. Vahid Soroor left (during a Qawali concert in India). In the spring of 1987, Vahid and his family moved to Canada, where he teamed up with his two brothers Walid and Wais Soroor and performed as the lead singer for the first musical group of Afghanistan in Toronto called Caravan in 1988. Vahid, then, joined his brother Walid Soroor and started a group called king of hearts or Sultane Qalbha where he assumed the role of the keyboard player while he continued his post secondary education at York University in Toronto.

Vahid was successful as a keyboard player and played with the likes of Hangama, Seema Tarana, Shadkam, Jawad Ghaziar and Walid Soroor among others artists from Afghanistan. Vahid returned to singing in 2004 and released his first CD titled Let's Dance in December 2005, which was well received by fans. Since the release of his CD, Vahid was invited to perform at several functions including; the 25th anniversary of the Ontario Afghan Association in 2006, the CHIN International picnic (an event held in Toronto, Canada, where artists from different nations represent their art and culture) and several fundraising events organized by local University students that were also from Afghanistan including one for the University of Kabul and One for the children of Afghanistan.

One of the reasons for Soroor's success has been his natural ability to sing in different languages and with different accents. Soroor can sing Dari, Pashtu, Hindi, Spanish, and Arabic. Vahid can also sing in English. Vahid gets his motivation for the music of Afghanistan from the earlier legend Ahmad Zahir, Farhad Darya and Amir Jan Sabori who have employed energy, emotions, creativity and professionalism to represent their art and their country.

Soroor's most recent projects include a new CD which will be released at the end of 2010, singing three songs alongside Hangama and Shadkam, for the upcoming movie Ehsas, which will be released soon and arranging an album for Hangama. Vahid’s new CD titled “Soroor” contains 12 new songs composed by Vahid himself, his brother Wais Soroor, Idris Sadozai and his father Khan Agha Soroor.

Soroor holds an honours degree in Biochemistry and Bachelor of Education with honors and is currently teaching chemistry and biology. Vahid Soroor is also involved in the Afghan community and has volunteered his time as a consultant and as an artist on several occasions, which has earned him respect from his compatriots in Toronto. Soroor recently coordinated an extensive project about the needs of a Youth for his countrymen in Toronto, a project funded by the Ministry of Children and Youth Services in Toronto. Soroor was subsequently interviewed by the Toronto Star and the CBC radio to shed more light on the matter.

He also presents the Dari Persian version of Who Wants To Be A Millionaire? since 2010.

== Discography ==
- Let's dance
- Soroor

== Personal life ==
At an early age, he married Anita and in 1999 she gave birth to a daughter, Miriam. After their divorce, Vahid remarried to Seena who had two more children, Sophia and Izick.
