= Qamar Gula =

Afghan singer (1952–2022)

- Born: 21 January 1952; Nangarhar, Afghanistan
- Died: 9 December 2022 (aged 70) Toronto, Ontario, Canada
- Genres: Pop; Classical Music; Ghazals
- Occupation: Afghan musician
- Years active: 1970–2022
- Labels: Various

Qamar Gula (Pashto: قمر ګله; Dari: قمر گل, Qamar Gul; 21 January 1952 – 9 December 2022) was an Afghan Canadian musician, who has been credited with being the second female Pashto language singer (after Rukhshana) to sing for the Radio Television Afghanistan. A veteran of Afghan music, she had a career that spanned nearly five decades.

== Early life ==
Qamar Gula was born in Nangarhar Province of Afghanistan. She started singing at the age of seven or eight, and due to wide audience appreciation she was encouraged to pursue it professionally.

== Career ==
Gula's career reached its zenith when she married Mohammad Din Zakhil who composed many of her songs. By the early 1970s, she gained fame across Afghanistan and ranked among the top female singers of the country. Her music was also heard by ethnic Pashtuns in Pakistan, particularly in what is now Khyber Pakhtunkhwa.

Gula’s music included compositions from Zakhil as well as other Afghan composers. Gula maintained her popularity among Afghans, particularly among the older generation who associated her music with the nostalgic times of Afghanistan before the civil war. Her voice was often referred to as “The Golden Voice” by the Afghan media. Over the years, she collaborated with various Afghan singers including Rukhshana in the 1970s, Gul Zaman in the 1980s, and in 2010s with Zarsanga, Waheed Qasemi, and Hangama.

== Immigration to Canada ==
Gula immigrated to Canada due to the civil war in Afghanistan. She lived in the province of Ontario, where she continued her music career.

== Death ==
Gula died of a prolonged illness on 9 December 2022, at the age of 70. She left behind three sons and three daughters.

== Awards ==
Gula won many awards throughout her lifetime, including the following:

- Golden Medals: Zahir Shah, Daoud Khan, Babrak Karmal and Mohammad Najibullah
- Nightingale title: Hamid Karzai - President of Afghanistan
- Best Singer: Ariana Television
- Best Singer: Afghan community of California

== See also ==
- List of Afghan singers
