= Mirzaei =

Mirzaei (Persian: میرزائی), also transliterated as Mirzayi, Mirzai, Mirzaie, Mirzayee, or Mirzaee, is a name of Kurdish or Persian origin. It is used as a surname or prefix to identify patriarchal lineage. It is derived from a historical title of Persian origin (Mīrzā), denoting the rank of a high nobleman, royal prince or a scholar.

Notable people with the surname include:

- Siroos Mirzaei, Iranian specialist in nuclear medicine
- Mirza Kuchik Khan, Gilan nationalist
- Qurban Ali Mirzaee, Afghan actor
