= Bakht =

Bakht may refer to:

== People ==
- Alireza Bakht, Iranian para taekwondo practitioner
- Bakht Singh, Indian evangelist
- Bakht Khan, Indian commander in the 19th century
- Bakht Zamina, Afghan Pashto singer
- Bidar Bakht, 15th/16th century Indian Mughal prince
- Bakht-un-Nissa Begum, Mughal princess
- Sikander Bakht, Indian politician
- Sikander Bakht (cricketer), Pakistani cricketer

== Places ==
- Baxt, Uzbekistan
