= Hungama =

Hungama may refer to:

- Hungama (1971 film), a Bollywood comedy film
- Hungama (2003 film), a Bollywood comedy by Priyadarshan
- Hungama (2005 film), a Telugu comedy film
- Hungama TV, an Indian children's television channel
- Hungama Digital Media Entertainment, Bollywood media company

== See also ==
- Bollywood Hungama, a Bollywood entertainment website
- Hangama, singer from Afghanistan
