= Saifo =

Afghan folkloric singer

Saifo (Hajji Saifo, 1942?–1998) (Persian: حاجی سيفو) was an Afghan folkloric singer. He is remembered for his controversial and provocative lyrics, much of it he improvised as he sang. He believed the power of verbal freedom (and spontaneity) should rule over both studio recording session and live performances. As such, he loosely based his songs on beforehand arranged lyrics. Sometimes this would result in songs altogether different in meaning than what was written initially. His recorded songs do reflect the un-meditated nature of his work.

== Background ==
Little is known of Saifo's early years, especially childhood and teenage years. His family roots is not clear and sources only speak of his life after his rise to fame which peaked in the 1980s. His date of birth is also not clearly known, but some sources have placed it in the early 1940s. This was due to his own reluctance in speaking about his past in his interviews. He maintained his fame transformed him physically and spiritually, and so there was no need to understand his past. He believed his personal history will confuse perceiving his post-fame personality that he wished to present as his true self. Those who knew him personally also didn't reveal more than the singer did himself. Whether this was at Saifo's specific instruction is not known.

== The singer ==
There are a few albums of Saifo recorded; however, they are sparse. Most of his fans preferred to see the live performance and mainly for the improvisation. This was more absorbing for the audience since the singer would sometimes go into a stupor like state, carrying his songs at lengths about unfaithful women, treacherous friends and unfair deprivation. In couple of his performances, it was said that he carried a song to almost a length of 30 minutes in which he debated with himself on these issues. Saifo is best known and famous in the three Persian-Speaking countries, Iran, Afghanistan and Tajikistan, for two special songs: Masoma and Laila Ghutai Jan. Masoma was based on the description of a beloved young lady and the song described her at length for her ideal qualities. Laila Ghutai Jan was more critical as it spoke of a beloved who had lost her affection. Although the main subject remained the same, the content of these songs were not consistent in his performances, making it almost a new presentation each time. Later the renditions of these songs by other singers and more recently by the late Nasrat Parsa (Masoma) made them memorable.

== Controversy ==
Saifo had established a reputation by the 80s for his unconventional style and boldness. His practice led to several controversies. In one wedding where his band was leading the music, he questioned the virility of the groom. On another occasion, he referred to a woman's breasts as hidden apples. Both of these happened while he was in heat of his singing stupor. Although he was satirized later, he was not dismissed from these events. However, on Mother's Day, he was requested to sing a song for mothers and controversy began. He is said to have started singing one of his songs in which he improvised (Persian: دو زلفان سیاه چو مار داری مادر من ... شنیدم با رقيبان تار داري مادر من ) which translates as ...two long black tresses like a snake you have, O Mother …I've known with our rivals illicit relations you have, O Mother. This led to agitation of the crowd who pelted him with tomatoes and eggs. Despite the negative publicity, the singer maintained the crowd misinterpreted the true meaning of his words.

== Death ==
The exact circumstances of Saifo's death are not clear. However, some sources attribute it to his lyrics which had provoked people at a wedding he was performing. It is maintained the wedding was a Taliban general's (the then rulers of Afghanistan) and Saifo offended the guests. What he sang and exactly what led to the Taliban soldiers firing on him is an issue of debate.

== Discography ==
- Masoma
- Mahali 1

== Trivia ==
- The comrade musicians of his band were highly respectful of him and obeyed his orders.
- When asked about claims of plagiarism, he vehemently refuted the charge and said the accusers are jealous people who didn't have sharp, instantaneous composing skills like he had and therefore are doing all they can to discredit him.
- Unlike other singers, he refused to leave Afghanistan despite the strife and civil war.
