= Mangal (singer) =

Mangal منګل
- Origin: Laghman Province, Kingdom of Afghanistan
- Genres: Folklore, Pop
- Years active: 1980–present
- Labels: Afghan Vision Records, Ariana Records

Mangal (Pashto: منګل) is an Afghan singer originally from Laghman Province of Afghanistan. He and his ex-wife, Naghma, were a popular duo during the 1970s and early 1990s. Mangal sings in Pashto and Dari. His music is popular in Afghanistan and parts of Pakistan, including among the Afghan diaspora and Pashtun diaspora around the world.

== Career ==
Mangal was born in Laghman Province of Afghanistan. As a young boy, he developed an interest in music. Mangal joined Naghma, a Farsiwan and Pashtun singer residing in Kabul. The two later got married.

With impending civil war, the couple left Afghanistan for Dubai in the United Arab Emirates and then in 1992 began residing in Pakistan. There, they became successful with an enthusiastic crowd of Afghan exiles who were nostalgic for their native music. Their financial situation by this time had improved significantly. In the late 1990s, they immigrated to the United States.

After establishing contact with the Afghan-American community of Northern California, the duo held a series of performances.

== Personal life ==
Mangal has eventually divorced from Naghma. The two have four children, two sons and two daughters. Their divorce has also cast a doubt as to whether this former pair can reconcile at least on the professional level. He later remarried and resides in California. While he performs solo in private events and television programs, Mangal is continuing his career as a professional artist. He is known to be very patriotic of Afghan culture and has dedicated many songs to Afghanistan.

== See also ==
- List of Afghan singers
- Music of Afghanistan
