= Abdul Khaliq Hussaini =

Journalist and media worker in Afghanistan (born 1977)

- Born: 1977 (age 47–48); Bamyan, Republic of Afghanistan
- Education: Law and Political Science
- Occupation: Journalist with the Khaama Press

Abdul Khaliq Hussaini is an ambassador for peace, journalist, social and community activist. Currently, he works as an international affairs journalist for Khaama Press, a leading news agency for Afghanistan. He was also a candidate of the Wolesi Jirga, the lower house of Afghanistan's National Assembly, for Kabul Province in 2018. He secured 3,000 votes.

== Early life and education ==
Hussaini spent his childhood in Kabul, the capital of Afghanistan. He was 12 when he lost his father, Abdul Hussain. Due to the civil wars in Kabul, he could not continue his school in Afghanistan and had to migrate to the neighboring Pakistan, where he finished his high school at Imam Hussain High School in Peshawar. After the fall of Taliban regime, he returned to Kabul, but could not restart his education until the year 2014 when he joined Istiqlal University to study Law and Political Science. He obtained a BA degree from Istiqlal University in early 2018.

== Social and Cultural Activities ==
Mr. Hussaini has been interested in working with the community from childhood. This led him to head over 1,000 volunteers at National Solidarity Party of Afghanistan from 2002 to 2017, in support of democracy in Afghanistan. He played a significant role in supporting the young people's voice during the Afghanistan presidential elections of 2009, 2014, and 2019. Hussaini received several letters of appreciation from national and international organizations and the government of Afghanistan for his contribution in support of election and democracy.

== Ambassador for Peace ==
Abdul Khaliq was recognized as an ambassador for peace by the Universal Peace Federation UPF for his community and social engagements in 2008. He has activity supported local peace programs in different parts of Kabul.

In addition to his journalism and social activities, Abdul Khaliq also has served as a senior advisor to the State Ministry for Peace, Afghanistan.

== Survived attack ==
On 28 October, unidentified gunmen injured Afghan journalist, Abdul Khaliq Hussaini. He was attacked by armed men while he was visiting a United Nations office in PD9 of Kabul city. The incident occurred at a time the Taliban is once again ruling the country and hundreds of journalists, civil society, and women rights activists had to flee the country. The attack was condemned by media support agencies both in Afghanistan and international Committee to Protect Journalists.
