= Sardar Haji Faiz Muhammad Khan Zikeria =

Afghan politician

Faiz Muhammad Zikria
- فیض محمد زکریا (Dari)

Minister of Education
- In office 1950–1952
- Monarch: Zahir Shah
- Preceded by: Abdol Hosayn Aziz
- Succeeded by: Dr. Abdul Majid

Ambassador to the United Kingdom
- In office 1949–1950
- Monarch: Zahir Shah
- Preceded by: Mohammed Naim Khan
- Succeeded by: Marshall Shah Wali Khan

Ambassador to Türkiye
- In office 1938–1948
- Monarch: Zahir Shah
- Preceded by: Sultan Ahmad Sherzoy
- Succeeded by: Muhammad Akram Noor

Minister of Foreign Affairs
- In office November 1929 – 1938
- Monarch: Nadir Shah / Zahir Shah
- Preceded by: Ghulam Siddiq
- Succeeded by: Ali Muhammad Khan

Minister of Education
- In office 1924–1927
- Monarch: King Amanullah Khan
- Preceded by: Hayatullah Khan
- Succeeded by: Ali Muhammad Khan

Personal details
- Born: 1892 Emirate of Afghanistan
- Died: November 8, 1979 (aged 86–87) Englewood Hospital, New Jersey
- Spouse(s): 2 wives - Humaira and Banazir
- Children: 9 sons, 4 daughters
- Parents: Sardar Gul Muhammad Khan (father); Hazrat Begum (mother)

Faiz Muhammad Zikria (1892 – 8 November 1979) was an Afghan politician. Son of Sardar Gul Muhammad Khan and great-grandson of Sardar Zikria Khan. During the reign of Amanullah Khan he was appointed as Afghan Envoy to Moscow in 1920. He was then appointed First Counsellor of Foreign Service in 1921 to Europe and visited London, Washington, Paris, Berlin and Rome before becoming First Under-Secretary in the Foreign Office in 1922 in addition to acting Minister of Education from 1923 to 1924. He became Minister for Education from 1924 to 1927.

During the short reign of Habibullah Kalakani he became a member of the "Council for the Maintenance of Order" in April 1929.

Once Mohammad Nadir Shah defeated Kalakani and claimed the throne, Faiz Muhammad Zikria was made Minister for Foreign Affairs between 1929–1938. After returning from pilgrimage to Mecca in 1933, he was involved in the investigation of the assassination of King Nadir Shah in November 1933.

During the reign of King Zahir Shah, he left Kabul in December 1935 for an extended European tour on the way visiting Iraq and Turkey where he was well received before going to Paris. In London he was given an audience by the King and had meetings with then Foreign Secretary Anthony Eden and Secretary of State for India Lord Zetland. He met with Hitler in Berlin and finally arrived back in Kabul in April 1936 via Moscow. He again travelled to Europe in 1936 and took part in preparations for the Treaty of Saadabad.

Later he became Ambassador to Turkey 1938–1948, Ambassador at the court of St James's 1949–1950 and to Saudi Arabia 1955–1960. He again became Minister of Education in 1950 before retiring in 1960 and emigrated to the USA in 1964. He was also a noted poet and writer. He died of cerebral haemorrhage at Englewood Hospital, New Jersey on 8 November 1979 and was buried in Peshawar, Pakistan.

== Personal life ==
Belonging to the Muhammadzai tribe, he had two wives, nine sons and four daughters. His sons are Faiz Ahmad Zikria, famous Dari poet, composer and musician Fazel Ahmad Khan Nainawaz, Dr. Amir Ahmad Zikria, Habib Ahmad Zikria, Bashir Ahmad Zikria, Najib Ahmad Zikria, Zia Ahmad Zikria and Ayaz Ahmad Zikria who died young. His four daughters include Fereshta Zikria, Fakhria Zikria, Afifa Zikria and Maliha Zikria.
