= Zahira Zahir =

Afghan-American barber and cosmetologist

- Other name: Z
- Education: Zarghuna High School
- Occupations: Barber, cosmetologist
- Parents: Abdul Zahir (father); Quraisha (mother)
- Relatives: Ahmad Zahir (brother)

Zahira Zahir (Pashto/Dari: ظاهره ظاهر) is a Washington barber and cosmetologist. Zahira's salon is in the Watergate Hotel in the Watergate complex in Washington, D.C. She is known for cutting the hair of former U.S. President George W. Bush. The President's nickname for her is Z.

== Early life and education ==
Zahira is the daughter of Abdul Zahir, who was the Prime Minister of Afghanistan from 1971 to 1972. An ethnic Pashtun, she is also the older sister of Ahmad Zahir, called the "Afghan Elvis". Zahira is a graduate of Zarghuna High School, where she later taught, a leading school for girls in Kabul.

== United States ==
Zahira moved to the United States in 1975, when her husband was Afghanistan's envoy to the United Nations.

After the Communist coup in Afghanistan in 1978, her brother was murdered. Her father subsequently put under house arrest, and all her family's assets were seized. Around the time of the Communist coup in Afghanistan she and her husband separated.

Zahira described working for Milton Pitts, President Ronald Reagan's barber, and accompanying Pitts to the White House to give the President a manicure while he got his hair cut, and being asked whether Reagan should authorize giving the Afghan resistance stinger missiles.

Zahira started cutting George H. W. Bush's hair. She also cut hair for Barbara Bush, Ronald Reagan, Margaret Thatcher, and other dignitaries. She described feeling hurt by the number of customers she lost following al Qaeda's attacks in the September 11 attacks. She also has commented about being brought to tears by former U.S. president George H. W. Bush's thoughtfulness, who contacted her following the September 11 attacks, saying:

I hope you're OK and that no one thinks you have anything to do with this.

When he learned of the prejudice she was experiencing, George H. W. Bush sent her an autographed photo, and organized autographed photos from several other Presidents who knew her.

== Legacy ==
In 2003, Zahira raised funds to restore schools for girls in Kabul.
