= Abdul Zahir (politician) =

Afghan diplomat and politician

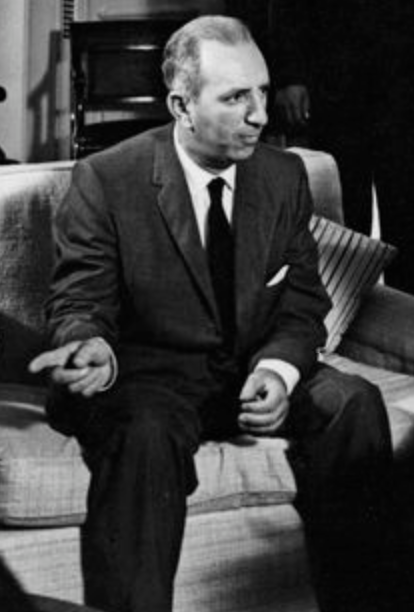
- Abdul Zahir in 1963

Speaker of the House of People
- In office 1961–1968
- Preceded by: Mohammad Nawroz Khan
- Succeeded by: Mohammad Omer Wardak

Prime Minister of Afghanistan
- In office 9 June 1971 – 12 December 1972
- Monarch: Mohammad Zahir Shah
- Preceded by: Mohammad Nur Ahmad Etemadi
- Succeeded by: Mohammad Musa Shafiq

Personal details
- Born: 3 May 1910 De Baghalak, Mihtarlam District, Laghman Province, Emirate of Afghanistan
- Died: 21 October 1982 (aged 72) Kabul, Democratic Republic of Afghanistan
- Party: Independent
- Spouse: Quraisha
- Children: Ahmad Zahir (1946–1979), Zahira Zahir (1940–), Asif Zahir (1932–2000), Belqis Zahir

Abdul Zahir (Pashto: عبدالظاهر) (3 May 1910 – 21 October 1982) was an Afghan politician who was Prime Minister of Afghanistan for over a year in the early 1970s, during the reign of King Mohammad Zahir Shah.

== Early life and education ==
A Pashtun from Laghman Province, Abdul Zahir was born in the village of De Baghalak in Mihtarlam District of Laghman Province in eastern Afghanistan. He had three or four brothers. His father's name was Mirza Abdul Qader.

Abdul Zahir attended secondary school in Kabul and university in the United States, earning an MD from Columbia University and a Master's degree in public health from Johns Hopkins University.

== Career ==
Abdul Zahir became a medical doctor and returned to Afghanistan to practice medicine, but eventually entered politics. His political positions included terms as Minister of Health, Speaker of House of the People from 1961 to 1968, and Ambassador to Italy and Pakistan. Most prominently, he served as Prime Minister of Afghanistan from June 1970 to December 1972. A few months after resigning, King Mohammad Zahir Shah was overthrown and Abdul Zahir retired from politics.

== Personal life ==
Abdul Zahir was married to Quraisha and had four children. His son Ahmad Zahir was a popular musician who died in a car accident in 1979. His daughter Zahira Zahir is a hairdresser in Washington, D.C. His eldest son, Asif Zahir (1932—2000) was also politically active during his lifetime as Minister of Rural Rehabilitation and Development in 1980s and he remained ambassador in Kuwait (1989—1992) and Italy (1992—1993). He resigned from his post and lived in Peshawar, Pakistan, where he started a campaign for peace in Afghanistan by setting up a political group called the Afghan National Movement (ANM). His youngest daughter, Belqiss Zahir is currently living in Germany and runs a beauty salon.

Political offices
Preceded by Mohammad Nur Ahmad Etemadi	Prime Minister of Afghanistan; 1971–1972	Succeeded by Mohammad Musa Shafiq
