= Abdul Ahmad Zahedi Niqala =

- Occupation: legislator

Doctor Abdul Ahmad Zahedi Niqala came to serve to represent Ghazni Province in Afghanistan's Meshrano Jirga, the lower house of its National Legislature, in 2005.

He is a member of the Hazara ethnic group. He practiced medicine first for an aid group from Sweden, and then in private practice in Qarabaqh.
