= Kabir Andarabi =

Afghani commander

Kadir Andarabi
- Born: Afghanistan
- Military career
- Allegiance: Jamiat-e Islami.
- Rank: General

General Kadir Andarabi was one of the top commanders of Ahmed Shah Massoud's Jamiat-e Islami during the Civil War in Afghanistan. He was reported to have been involved in the Afshar Operation.

Following the fall of the Taliban Kabir Andarabi was a senior ministry of defense commander stationed in Bagrami District, until mid-2005. Following this he worked as a police official in the ministry of interior. The Chief of Police for Baghlan Province is currently Mohammad Kabir Andarabi however it is unclear if they are the same person.
