= Razia Muradi =

- Born: 1995 or 1996 (age 29–30); Islamic State of Afghanistan
- Education: Veer Narmad South Gujarat University
- Awards: Gujarat academic gold medal, 2022

Razia Muradi (born in 1995 or 1996) is an Afghan woman who won a scholarship to Veer Narmad South Gujarat University in India before winning the university's gold medal for the highest grades in the academic year.

She is a critic of the Taliban.

== Early life ==
Muradi was born in Afghanistan and spent time in Kabul.

== Education ==
In February 2021, after winning a scholarship from the Indian Council for Cultural Relations, she moved to India to study for a master's degree in public administration at the Veer Narmad South Gujarat University in Gujarat State in Western India.

Muradi was in India as the Taliban took over Afghanistan in 2021 and was critical of their human rights record in 2023.

In April 2022, she ranked number one in the university, after being graded with a grade point average of 8.60 for the academic year. On March 11, 2023, Acharya Devvrat, the governor of Gujarat awarded her a gold medal.

As of March 2023, she was studying for a PhD in public administration.
