= Soosan Firooz =

Afghan actress and rapper

Soosan Firooz (Dari: سوسن فیروز; born 1989), sometimes spelled Susan Feroz, is an Afghan actress and rapper. She has been described as Afghanistan's first female rapper. She is a controversial figure, challenging societal norms and the traditional role of Afghan women.

Firooz was born in Afghanistan. Her family fled the country and lived in an Iranian refugee camp for seven years during Afghanistan's civil war in the 1990s. In Iran, she encountered hostility from Iranians and was unable to attend school with any regularity due to bureaucratic entanglements. Her family then spent three years in Pakistan as refugees.

Following the fall of the Taliban, Firooz's family returned to Afghanistan. They moved to Kandahar in 2003, where her father had secured employment. She worked alongside her siblings, weaving rugs. The family moved to Kabul in 2011 and she became an actress, taking small roles in local television soap operas and movies.

Firooz asked for and received permission to rap from her father, Abdul Ghafar Firooz. She came to the attention of Afghan musician Farid Rastagar, who has promoted her and composed her first single. Firooz raps in Dari. Her first single, "Our Neighbors", was released in 2012. The song explores the plight of Afghan refugees in stark terms. It was composed by Rastagar with lyrics by poet Suhrab Sirat. Her song, "Naqisul Aql" means "mentally disturbed" and is an epithet used against women in Afghanistan.

Firooz lives with her family in north Kabul. She has been threatened with acid attacks, kidnapping, and death. Her mother, who does humanitarian work in southern Afghanistan, has also received death threats. Her father gave up his job at the electrical department and acts as her manager and bodyguard, accompanying her to studios. Her uncle cut off relations with her family out of disapproval of Firooz appearing on television and singing.

Firooz performed at a three-day music festival in Kabul in October 2012.

== See also ==
- Sonita Alizadeh
- Paradise Sorouri
- Taliban treatment of women
- Women's rights in Afghanistan
