= Tawab Arash =

Singer from Afghanistan

Tawab Arash تواب آرش
- Born: July 6, 1976 (age 50); Herat, Afghanistan
- Origin: Afghan
- Genre: Afghan music
- Occupation: Singer
- Years active: 1999–present

Tawab Arash (Persian: تواب آرش) (born 6 July 1976 in Herat, Afghanistan) is an Afghan singer and musician. He is the nephew of the famous Afghan singer and composer Amir Jan Sabori and the brother of Nemat Arash.

== Biography ==
Tawab Arash was born on 6 July 1976, in Herat, Afghanistan in a Tajik family. The nephew of the singer Amir Jan Sabori, he became inspired of the family and got the dedication to be a musician. In 1999, after he moved to Russia, he started to sing and learn the keyboard with the encouragement and guidance of his brothers, and in due course with an Indian teacher.

In 1996, Arash started his music career when he performed in Russia. He then moved to Sweden and held his first major live concerts in Stockholm with musician Mirwais Hamrah. In 2006, he released his debut studio album Roshani (روشنی), and was followed by his second album, Chai Wa Chilam (چای و چلم), in 2007, which made him popular across Afghanistan. In the next year, Arash has released many singles, including "Roosari Siah" (روسری سیاه), "Roobaro" (روبرو), "Bia Janam" (بیا جانم), "Diware Ghazal" (دیوار غزل), and "Chashm Khomari" (چشم‌خماری).

In 2013, he collaborated with several many famous Afghani singers to perform the sports anthem celebrating the victory of the Afghan national football team. He then continued to perform at international Afghan concerts and release singles, including "Afghani Lebas" (لباس افغانی) in 2019, "Nazdaneh" (نازدانه) in 2022, "Gole Man" (گل من) in 2024, and "Naz Herati" (ناز هراتی) in 2025.

== Discography ==
=== Studio albums ===
- Roshani (روشنی)
- Chai Wa Chilam (چای و چلم)

=== Notable singles ===
- "Roosari Siah" (روسری سیاه)
- "Roobaro" (روبرو)
- "Bia Janam" (بیا جانم)
- "Diware Ghazal" (دیوار غزل)
- "Chashm Khomari" (چشم‌خماری)
- "Gole Man" (گل من)
- "Naz Herati" (ناز هراتی)

=== Collaborative tracks ===
- "Lalaie" (لالایی) – featuring Amir Jan Sabori
