= Paradise Sorouri =

Paradise Sorouri is the first female Afghan rapper, notable for her protest songs against violence against women in Afghanistan and elsewhere.

Born in Iran, in 2007 she returned to Afghanistan with her family. She and her companion Ahmed, nicknamed "Diverse", go to Tajikistan and record several songs there. She sings for women's freedom in Afghanistan. Her work denounces violence against women and their living conditions. She suffered death threats and physical attacks, was beaten by ten men, and left to die in the street, for her music and activism. A documentary called 'Rebel Beats' was produced about her and her partner 'Diverse'.

== See also ==
- Sonita Alizadeh
