= Abu Mansour al-Hosein ibn Muhammad al-Marghani =

Abu Mansour al-Hosein ibn Muhammad al-Marghani (Persian, Arabic:ابو منصور الحسین ابن محمّد المرغنی), from Marghan, in Ghōr Province, Afghanistan, was a Persian Muslim historian.

He is known through his book Ghoror al-seyar, which contains accounts from the story of Adam and Eve, to the time of Mahmud Ghaznavi. The book was presented to Abunasr Sabuktigin upon completion. Part of the book contains the Arabic translations of Shahnameh indicating that it was known to al-Marghani at the time.
