= Burka Band =

Afghan Indie-rock band

- The Burka Band in 2002

Background information
- Origin: Kabul, Afghanistan
- Genre: Indie rock
- Years active: 2002–2021
- Label: Ata Tak
- Members: Three anonymous Afghan women

The Burka Band (or the Blue Burqa Band) was an Afghan all-female indie rock band formed in Kabul in 2002. They performed anonymously, with all of the members wearing burqas in an apparent protest against the Taliban's rules regarding Islamic dress; the members were never officially identified to ensure their protection. They released the single "Burka Blue" and a self-titled album in 2003. "Burka Blue" came about during a workshop at the Afghanistan National Institute of Music, sponsored by the Goethe-Institut, in October 2002. Blue-colored burqas, also called "shuttlecock", are traditional attire in Afghanistan.

The group gained some popularity in Europe in the 2000s, and toured in Germany, where one of their songs was remixed by the DJ Barbara Morgenstern. Singing in burqas was a joke, but also necessary to avoid retaliation by religious fanatics, according to Nargiz, a member and the drummer of the band.

According to several online interviews, the Burqa Band is on permanent hiatus after the lead singer moved to Pakistan to pursue a music career. Their last tracked activity on MySpace dates back to 2007. Some accounts under their name exist on Spotify, although it hasn't been confirmed to be them.
