= Ahmad Javeed Ahwar =

Tajik historian

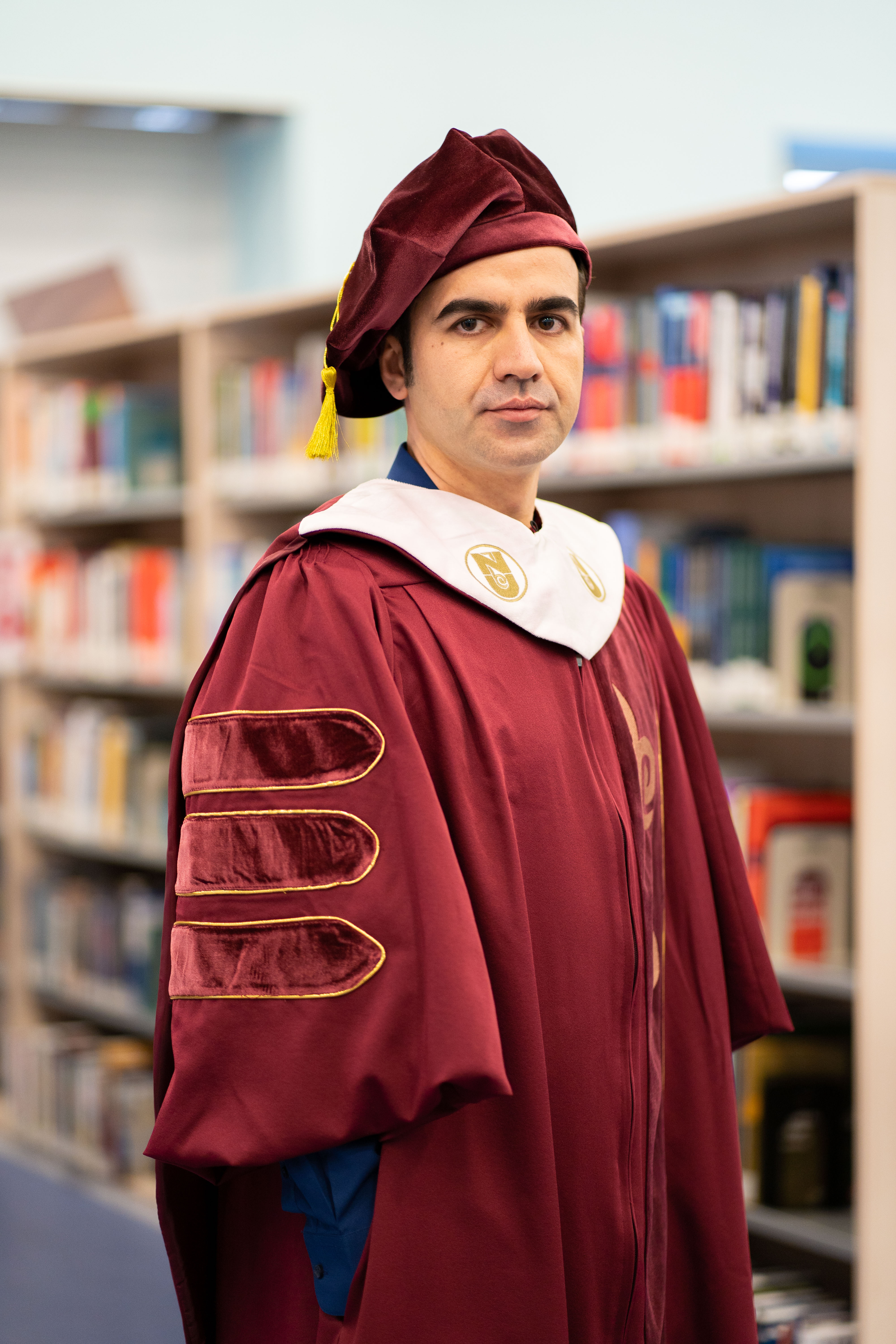
Javeed Ahwar in his PhD graduation wardrobe

Javeed Ahwar or جاوید احور is a Dutch historian of Tajik Persian origin. He has a PhD degree in Eurasian studies with focus on early modern to modern history of Mawara al-Nahr and Khurasan. Ahwar is also an author, columnist and social media activist discussing issues related to nationalism, anti-colonialmism, and radicalism.

== Early life ==
Ahwar was born on 29 May 1987 in Kabul into a Persian speaking family of Tajik origin belonging to the renowned Khuja Yaqub al-Charkhi's Sufi order. His parents were born in Ghazni. In 2012, he immigrated to the Netherlands, subsequently earning Dutch citizenship for himself and his immediate family.

== Education ==
Ahwar spent his childhood in Ghazni under the Taliban's rule. He was enrolled in Sanai School in Ghazni, a boys' school named after the renowned Sufi Persian poet Sanai. Ahwar attended Law and Political Science School at Kabul University. He graduated with a Bachelor of Science degree from Law School in 2009. In 2010, he received a scholarship from the OSCE Academy in Bishkek to pursue his master studies in Politics and Security in Central Asia in Kyrgyzstan. Furthermore, he acquired his second master degree from Leiden University in the Netherlands in European and International Human Rights Law and his third master degree from Utrecht University in the Netherlands in Cultural Anthropology. Ahwar has a PhD degree in Eurasian studies from Nazarbayev University in Kazakhstan. His expertise lies in early modern and modern history of Mawara al-Nahr and Khurasan (later known as Uzbekistan, Tajikistan and Afghanistan). Ahwar is fluent in Persian, Pashtu, Urdu, English and Dutch languages. Ahwar joined Nazarbayev University as a lecturer in 2023 and teaches history of Central Asia.
