= Rishad Zahir =

Afghan singer

- Born: Rishad Zahir
- Occupation: Singer

Rishad Zahir (Pashto/Dari: رشاد ظاهر) is a United States–based Afghan singer and musician. He is the son of the Afghan singer Ahmad Zahir.

== Early life ==
Rishad Zahir was born in Seattle, Washington, during his parents' visit to the United States. After spending a year in Seattle, they all returned to Afghanistan. Soon after, Rishad, accompanied by his mother, left for the United States permanently. He and his family are from the Pashtun ethnic group and are originally from Laghman.

== Career ==
He showed interest in music at the age of 11. Zahir was inspired by his father's music and singing. While perfecting his understanding of his mother tongue, he also furthered his studies in the art of music by seeking the guidance of elite musicians and studying books and classical music. In 1987, at the age of 17, Zahir released his first full album, Guli Intezar. He then released a second album in 1990, Tu Guli Nazi Hama. His third album, Negahi Gahi, was released in 1993. He had eight concerts from 1990 in both the U.S. and Europe. With his interest in music fully developed, he decided to pursue his interest in Dari literature. He was driven to pursue a greater understanding of Persian literature by the fact that he had been deprived of the opportunity in Afghanistan. Zahir currently resides in California.

== Discography ==
His CD titled Ishq-e-Mann was released in November 1999.

=== Album: Various ===
- 01 – Imroz
- 02 – Dilbara
- 03 – Deedar
- 04 – Chi Khab Deedam-o
- 04 – Tu Kujayee

=== Album: Live Volume 1 ===
- 01 – Ze Jaan Man
- 02 – Soze Qalbam
- 03 – Maast o Ghazal Khan
- 04 – Jaan Jan
- 05 – Har Chand o Mara
- 06 – Door Az Tu
- 07 – Bego Ke Gul
- 08 – Baaz Ai
- 09 – Aqlam Rabood
- 10 – Anke Ze Dar Merasad

=== Album: Live Volume 2 ===
- 01 – San Nest
- 02 – Ze Ha Mo
- 03 – Ya Mawla
- 04 – Muhammad
- 05 – Imshaab
- 06 – Ba Kudam Dar
- 07 – Akhreen Sham
- 08 – Agar Penhan

=== Album: Live Volume 3 ===
- 01 – Tura Man Dost Medaram
- 02 – Rshani Chashmam
- 03 – Khyal
- 04 – Khuda Konad
- 05 – Faqat Soze
- 06 – Dil Shuda Ghafel
- 07 – Ai Deedai Ranj
