= Naqibullah Orya Khail =

Afghan politician

Dr Naqibullah Orya Khail
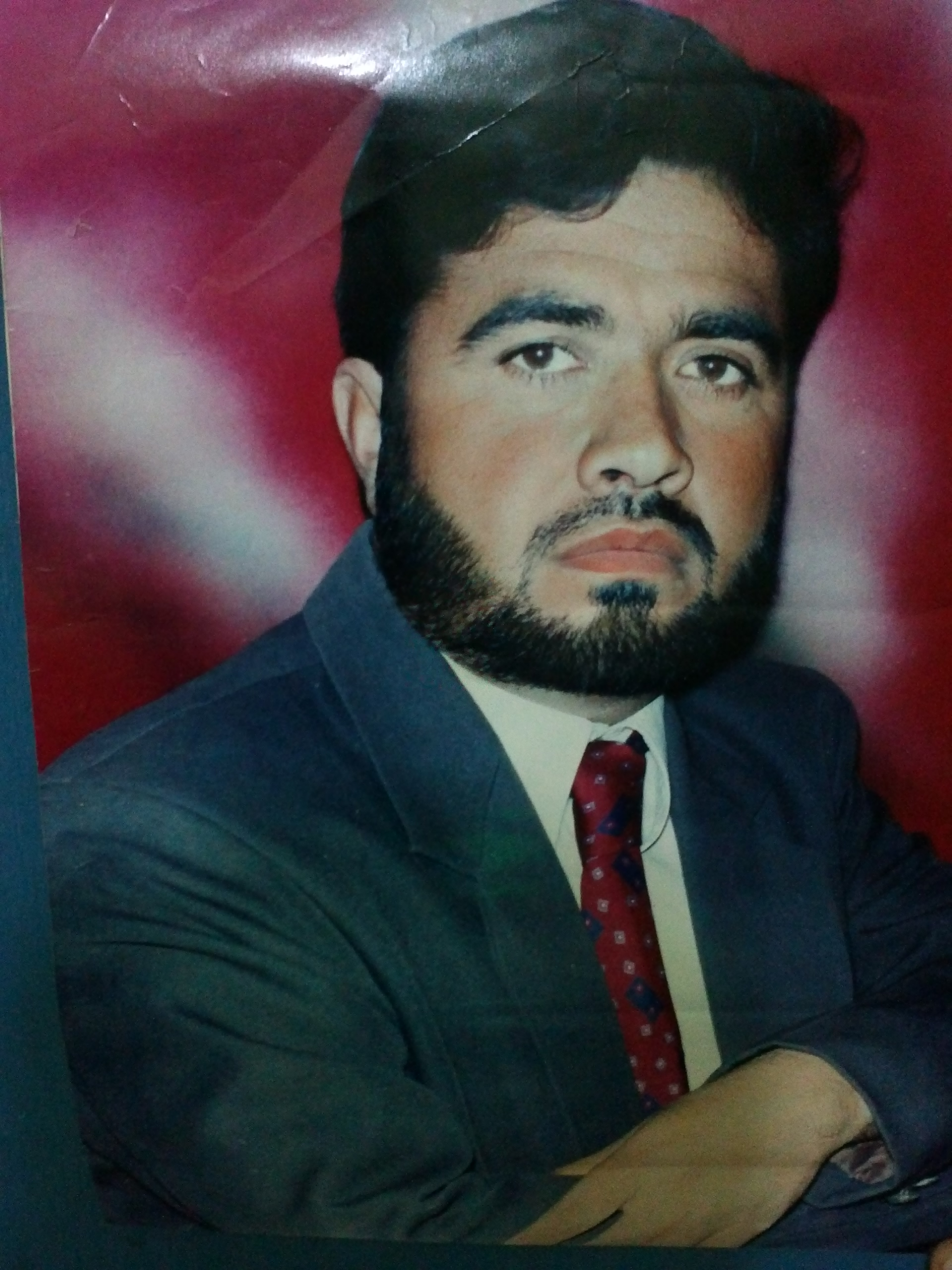
- Khail as Assistant Commander with the Mujahideen during the Soviet–Afghan War

Leader of Hezbullah Afghanistan
- Incumbent
- Assumed office 15 February 2005
- Vice President: Mahirullah Mahir, Sayed Anas Saddat
- Preceded by: Gulbuddin Hekmatyar

Assistant Commander during Soviet–Afghan War in Laghman Province
- In office 14 August 1986 – 28 May 1994
- Preceded by: Mahirullah Mahir
- Succeeded by: Gulbuddin Hekmatyar

Personal details
- Born: 1969 (age 56–57) Laghman, Afghanistan
- Party: Independent
- Children: 7
- Education: Zia-ul-Madaris Peshawar

Dr. Naqibullah Orya Khail (Pashto:داكترنقیب الله اوریا خیل, Persian:داكترنقیب الله اوریا خیل, born 1969) is an Afghan politician. He is the Leader of Hezb-e-Jawanan Musalman Afghanistan. He was elected leader on February 15, 2005. Usually referred to as Naqibullah Orya Khail, he previously served as a member of Hezbi Islami and served as an Assistant Commander of Mujahideen in Laghman Province during Soviet–Afghan War.

== Early life ==
Naqib was born in 1969 in the Laghman Province of Afghanistan. He is an ethnic Pashtun of Orya Khail tribe. He completed his primary and secondary education at Hazrat Imam Hussain School in Peshawar. He attended National Council for Homeopathy in Islamabad. He completed his Master of Arts in Islmiat From Jamia Zia-ul-Madaris Peshawar.

== Soviet–Afghan War ==
During the Soviet–Afghan War He served as an Assistant Commander in Laghman Province.

== Leadership of Hezbullah Afghanistan ==
He served as a member of Hezbi Islami in 1984. On February 15, 2005 Naqibullah and his followers established Hezb-e-Jawanan Musalman Afghanistan Political Party and Naqibullah was elected leader. He was jailed for 22 days in Laghman Province. Nine years later on March 21, 2014 the party changed its name to Hezbullah Afghanistan.
