= Malak Yousaf Afghan =

Malak Yousaf Yasin khel, a Dilzak Afghan, was the father of Ali (Marrani Baba, Charsadda). He is known among Pashtun people as Shaheed baba. Malak Yousaf was the commander of the Afghan Brigade in Ghaznavids Army. In 977, Sabuktigin captured Kandahar. So keeping this advancement in mind Jayapala ordered his army to march toward Ghazna but he was defeated by Sebuktagin. Soon he (Sabuktigin) conquered Peshawar and extended his territories toward Neelab (Indus River). In 992 he was killed with other Afghan soldiers against Raja Jay Pal. His mazar (shrine) is in Mardan. He is the grandparent of Yousaf Khel, a subbranch of Yasin Khel.

Ali ibn Yousaf, son of Malak Yousaf Afghan and a scholar was selected by the elders as the leader of Dilzak tribe after death of his father. He is known in Pashtun history as Marrani Baba ("Brave Saint"). After a strong hold on Peshawar, he was nominated by the Ghaznavid Empire as the Chief Judge of the Region. He is also the primogenitor of the Qazyan family. He was killed in a war against Hindu Shahi Armies at Charsadda.
