= Dawood Laghmani =

Afghan politician

Governor of Ghazni Province
- In office May 27, 2021 – August 12, 2021
- Preceded by: Haji Wahidullah Kalimzai
- Succeeded by: Mohammedzai Sadiq

Governor of Faryab Province
- In office May 17, 2021 – May 25, 2021
- Preceded by: Naqibullah Faiq
- Succeeded by: Abdul Muqim Rasikh

Dawood Mohammed Laghmani is an Afghan politician who served as the governor of Ghazni Province from May 2021 until August 2021, when he surrendered the province to the Taliban.

== Biography ==
Laghmani is a Pashtun. On May 17, 2021, when Laghmani was set to be appointed as the governor of Faryab Province, he was unable to be sworn in due to heavy protests outside of the provincial capital of Maimana spurred by Junbish-e-Islami supporters. The protesters considered Laghmani to be just a government appointee as he is a close friend of then-Afghan president Ashraf Ghani, and wanted a governor that the people picked. Laghmani was also Pashtun and set to appoint a predominantly-Uzbek province where he did not speak the language. Laghmani returned to Kabul on May 25, with acting deputy governor of Faryab Abdul Muqim Rasikh being sworn in as the new governor. He was appointed governor of Ghazni Province on May 29, 2021, succeeding Haji Wahidullah Kalimzai. Oxford Analytica attributed Laghmani's failed appointment in Faryab as a factor in why President Ghani depleted Afghan forces in the province, leading to the Taliban taking over the area more easily in August.

During the Taliban takeover of Afghanistan in August 2021, Laghmani fled the province after negotiating a deal with the Taliban to give up the city of Ghazni and the wider province. Officials in Ghazni later stated that during the offensive, Laghmani had hosted negotiations at the governors' office in the city between provincial officials and the Taliban, leading to the city falling bloodlessly. He had even reportedly given the Taliban mediators flowers. He was arrested by Afghan National Army forces in the Kotal-e-Takht area of Maidan Wardak Province attempting to flee the country. He was intended to be charged with treason, although the Afghan government in Kabul fell before this could happen.
