= Mohammad Akram (general) =

Afghan politician

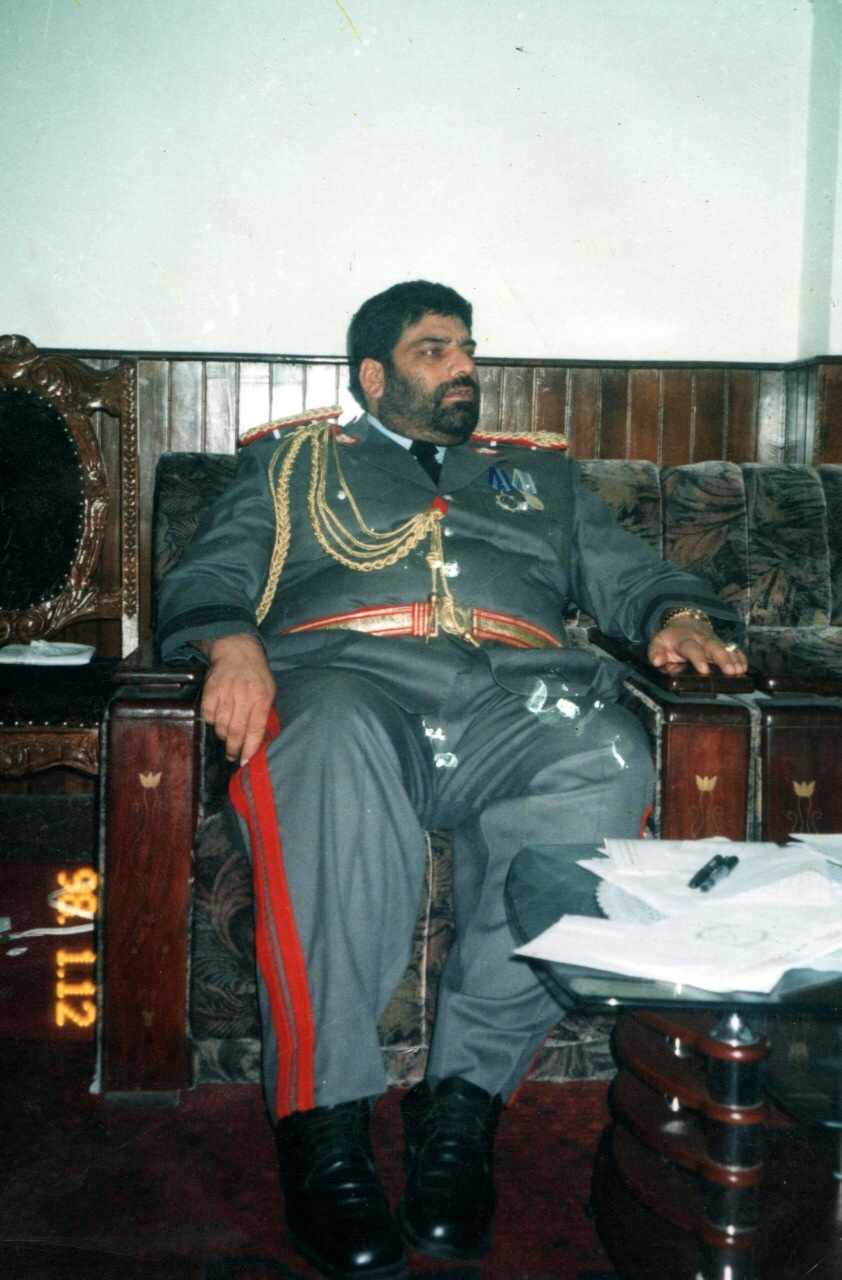
Major General Mohammad Akram Khakrizwal

Mohammad Akram "Khakrezwal" (Pashto: جنرال محمد اکرم خاکرېزوال) (died 2005) was a former police chief of Kabul who was killed in a suicide bomb attack soon after being appointed Vice Chief of Staff of the Afghan National Army. He had also served as commander of southern forces during Afghanistan's communist era.
