= Mohammad Haider Zhobal =

Afghan author of history

Mohammad Haider Zhobal (born in Kabul, Afghanistan, d. 1959) was an Afghan historian and scholar.

== Author career ==
Zhobal was raised in Kabul, Afghanistan.

In 1958, he defied Afghan government's censorship by publicly praising the role of Mahmud Tarzi in the country's history.

== Selected publications ==
=== Essays ===
- About Zulf and Zulfeen (1954)
- The Influx of Foreign Words and Expressions in Our Language (1956)

=== Books ===
- Uṣūl-i jadīd-i tadrīs-i zabān-i Fārsī ("On modern teaching techniques of Persian language", 1960s)
- Tārīkh-i adabīyāt-i Afghānistān ("History of the literatures of Afghanistan", 1957/1958)
