= Matiullah Turab =

Afghan poet (1971–2025)

- مطیع اللہ تراب
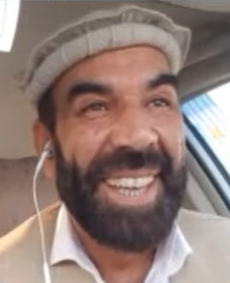
- Turab in 2019
- Born: Matiullah Turab; 21 March 1971; Khogyani, Nangrahar, Afghanistan
- Died: 14 July 2025 (aged 54); Khost, Afghanistan
- Occupation: Poet
- Relatives: Molvi Rasool (father)
- Writing career
- Pen name: Turab Saib | تراب صیب
- Language: Pashto
- Period: 2000s–2025
- Notable works: Ghubar Par Hindaro; Llami Gullona; Da Karni Oba; Speen Baghawat
- Literary movement: Pakhtoonwali

Matiullah Turab (Pashto: مطیع الله تراب; 21 March 1971 – 14 July 2025) was an Afghan poet. His poetry has been popular among Pashtuns from Afghanistan and Pakistan.

== Early life ==
Turab was born on 21 March 1971 in Khogyani District, Nangarhar Province, Afghanistan. He grew up in Nangarhar Province, and spent most of his life in Khost province, and his ancestral roots remained tied to Khogyani.

Despite not having a formal education, he became a prominent Pashto poet, with his work spread via live recitals, viral YouTube clips, and social gatherings.

He worked as a car body maker. He fled from the Soviet war like many other families to Pakistan and lived in Khyber Pakhtunkhwa, Kurram Agency for a while and then returned to his home country Afghanistan in the 2000s.

He was recognized and invited to Kabul by then President Hamid Karzai, despite his critical stance even toward Karzai’s government.

In an interview with the BBC Urdu in February 2017, Turab said that; "he does not want to criticize anyone. But in his opinion, romance and romantic poetry have no meaning in times of war and conflict. A novel is written when there is peace. When there is no worry about bread, clothes and housing, when there is no war and conflict. In my opinion, poetry is that in which the feelings of a helpless and forced person find a voice."

== Death ==
Turab died from a heart attack at a hospital in Khost, on 14 July 2025, at the age of 54. His funeral took place on Tuesday, 15 July 2025, in Nangarhar province, attended by tribal elders, literature enthusiasts, local officials, and citizens with widespread mourning across Afghanistan and Pakistan. Others were held in Khost and in Sherzai Stadium, Jalalabad at 2 p.m., followed by a village burial in Kozbiar, Khogyani, Nangarhar at 4 p.m. His body was airlifted by helicopter on the same day.

His passing prompted tributes from the Afghan Ministry of Information and Culture, IEA spokesperson Zabihullah Mujahid, former President Hamid Karzai, Anas Haqqani, and others.
