= Khoshi Mahtab =

Afghan singer

Khoshi Mahtab (Dari خوشی مهتاب) is an Afghan singer who sings in both Pashto and Dari (Persian) in Afghanistan.

== Biography ==
Khoshi Mahtab is an ethnically pashtun people singer, who was born in Kabul, Afghanistan, singing in both Dari (Persian) and Pashto. She has been threatened by her family especially her brother and other relatives as well as Taliban to stop singing, but she bravely refused. The Dailybeast described her and her sister Asma as the world bravest singers.
