= Zalmay A. Gulzad =

Zalmay A. Gulzad is professor of social sciences at Harold Washington Community College in Chicago.

== Biography ==
Gulzad was born in Kabul, Afghanistan, and earned his Ph.D. in history from the University of Wisconsin–Madison. He has a M.A. from the University of Illinois-Urbana and B.A. from Northeastern Illinois University. Zalmay has lectured extensively on current affairs in South Asia, Central Asia, and the Middle East. His area of research covers contemporary Afghan politics and the importance of its stability for the progress of the region. He is also the author of a textbook titled, External Influences and the Development of the Afghan State in the Nineteenth Century.

He has been a faculty member at Harold Washington College for 23 years and has developed courses on international relations, American foreign policy, politics of the Middle East, and history of contemporary Asia. Zalmay has spoken on radio, television and conference panels about the current affairs in Afghanistan.
