= Ehsan Aman =

Afghan American singer

- احسان امان
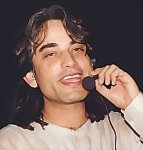
- Born: Ehsan Aman; 1959 (age 66–67); Lashkargah, Afghanistan
- Occupations: singer; composer; architecture engineer
- Years active: 1978–present
- Height: 170 cm (5 ft 7 in)
- Musical career
- Genres: Pop music; Dance music
- Instruments: Guitar, harmonium, accordion
- Labels: Fifth String Entertainment, Inc

Ehsan Aman (Dari/Pashto: احسان امان – Eḥsān Amān; born 1959) is an Afghan-American singer. He is one of the few veterans of Afghanistan’s lost music Golden Age who've maintained their popularity over the decades. He gained fame in Afghanistan during the 1970s and early 1980s with his first singles and the performances he held at Kabul University. Exiled since the early 80s in the US, he has continued writing and producing music in the state of Virginia, which has also been his residence since that time.

Aman is married to the daughter of songwriter Nainawaz.

== Early life ==
Ehsan was born in Lashkargah, Helmand, Afghanistan, to Mohammad Aman Ibrahim, an engineer by profession. The lineage of his family can be traced to the distinguished people of Helmand province. Ehsan's interest in music developed in early childhood when he learned to play the accordion. This led to his participation in his high school music functions that raised public support for his professional pursuit of music. After completing his high school education, Ehsan won a scholarship to enter Kabul University and he followed his father's footsteps to study.

Ehsan's serious interest in music began during university - during his attendance as a student, he held various live performances; Ehsan's popularity began to rise. However, there were tensions between Aman and media personalities - the adverse circumstances of the time period led to misinterpretation of his lyrics and contributed to negative publicity. His songs – which were regulars of Kabul Radio Station – were banned.

== Career ==
Avoiding a confrontation that could have cost him his life, he chose to leave the country. He arrived in Pakistan in 1981. In October 1982, he immigrated to the United States, re-kindling his musical pursuits. In spite of economic and technical difficulties, he collaborated with other exiled musicians from Afghanistan and, in 1983, he released his first album: Musafer.

However, burdened with family life and the adjustment to the adopted country, Ehsan limited his involvements from 1985 to 1993 to a career in engineering. After 1993, at the request of fans, he returned to music.

In January 2002, he was asked by the Embassy of Afghanistan in Washington, D.C. to re-arrange the national anthem of Afghanistan. He performed his rendition in front of a 3,500 member audience, achieving acclaim for his achievement.

== Personal life ==
In 1985, Ehsan married his wife Sahar who is the daughter of the late Afghan poet and composer Nainawaz. His wife supports his musical endeavors and often accompanies him to his concert performances. Ehsan is also a calligrapher and an avid tennis player. From 1976 to 1980, he was a member of the Afghan National Tennis Team, and participated in many international tennis competitions outside of Afghanistan.

== Accolades ==
- 1996: Artist of the Year. Afghan Youth Ballot. (Reported by Karwan Newspaper.)

== Discography ==
Year	Title	Notes
1983	Musafer	First Album
1999	Sahar	Named in Honor of his Wife Sahar
2001	Blue Moods	
2002	Afghan Hope new songs romantic	Devoted for Afghan Children
2004	Heart Beat	
2005	Echoes from the Past	

== Videography ==
Year	Title	Notes
2001	Live in Concert	Ehsan's First DVD

== Filmography ==
Year	Title	Notes
2007	The Kite Runner	Cameo appearance as a wedding singer.

== References and footnotes ==
- Ehsan Live in Concert. Ehsan's Introduction. DVD Video. TriVision. 2001.
- https://web.archive.org/web/20071212103213/http://www.zebamagazine.com/ Zeba Magazine. Ehsan Aman: His Upcoming Album & CD. June 2006
