= Durkhanai Ayubi =

Afghan food expert in Australia

- Ayubi in 2026
- Born: 1985 (age 40–41); Kabul, Afghanistan
- Occupations: Food expert; restaurateur; author
- Known for: Parwana: Recipes and Stories from an Afghan Kitchen
- Awards: Art of Eating Prize (2021); Guild of Food Writers Award (2021); "40 Under 40" Social Impact Award (2022)

Durkhanai Ayubi (born 1985) is an Afghan food expert, restaurateur, and prize-winning cookbook author based in Adelaide, Australia. She is best known for her cookbook and culinary memoir, Parwana, which features traditional Afghan and family recipes, many of which she and her family have cooked in their restaurant of the same name. Throughout the book, Ayubi traces the history of Afghanistan and its diverse society from antiquity to the present. She describes how new ideologies, such as Soviet-inspired communism and Islamic extremism, informed movements that challenged Afghan culture and traditions and led to large-scale displacement of Afghans, including many members of her own family. Since 2018, she has been a member of the Atlantic Fellows program based at the London School of Economics, which aims to address global inequities through collective action. In 2022 Ayubi won the "40 under 40" Social Impact Award, an annual competition that recognizes young South Australian entrepreneurs.

== Family, education and career ==
Durkhanai Ayubi was born in 1985 in Kabul, Afghanistan to Zelmai and Farida Ayubi. She is one of five daughters. The Soviet-Afghan War displaced the Ayubi family, leading them to emigrate to Australia via Pakistan in 1987. They initially settled in Melbourne before moving to Adelaide in 1989.

In 2009, her family opened their first restaurant, Parwana, in Adelaide, which later inspired her cookbook. The family returned to Afghanistan in 2012 for the first time since their emigration. In 2014, they opened their second restaurant, Kutchi Deli Parwana, which reflects the street-food culture that they encountered during their trip.

Ayubi's mother is the cousin of Sayd Majrouh, the philosopher, poet, journalist, diplomat and literary scholar, best known for his epic poem, Ego-Monstre, and work monitoring the impact of the Soviet War as the director of the Afghan Information Center.

In 2018, Durkhanai Ayubi became a Senior Fellow of the UK-based Atlantic Fellows in Society Equity program. She has spoken widely on social equity issues and was a featured speaker in 2021 at the Melbourne Social Equity Institute in partnership with the Peter McMullin Center on Statelessness. She has written on food-related topics for periodicals including The Telegraph (London).

== Cookbook: Parwana: Recipes and Stories from an Afghan Kitchen ==
Durkhanai Ayubi published her cookbook, Parwana: Recipes and Stories from an Afghan Kitchen, in September 2020. It contains approximately 100 recipes inspired by her family, with many transmitted by her mother, Farida Ayubi. Ayubi couples these recipes with reflections on Afghan history, culture, and politics. Parwana was published by Interlink Publishing (Massachusetts, US), which specializes in books relating to global culture, including cookbooks and cultural guides.

In 2021, The Guardian featured recipes from Parwana, along with a story about Durkhanai Ayubi and her mother Farida, in its series on Australian food and drink. In particular, it featured recipes for dishes that Farida's widowed father used to cook for his children for breakfast. The Harvard Bookstore featured Ayubi and described Parwana as "not just a cookbook [but] a culinary family history". She has featured in podcasts and radio interviews with many news outlets including the BBC.

== Awards ==
Durkhanai Ayubi received critical acclaim for Parwana. The book won an Art of Eating Prize for the best food book of the year in 2021 and the Guild of Food Writers award for the best international cookbook in 2021. She was also nominated for the Fortnum & Mason Food and Drink Award for the best debut cookbook of the year in 2021. Among those who have praised Ayubi and her book Parwana are the British food writer Nigella Lawson and the Nobel laureate, Malala Yousafzai.

In 2022, Ayubi won a "40 under 40" award for young South Australian entrepreneurs. The award recognized her work on behalf of migrants to Australia and noted her efforts to raise more than $180,000 for Afghans affected by the fall of Afghanistan to the Taliban regime in 2021. Ayubi herself noted her commitment to promoting understanding about Afghan peoples and migrants in Australia while promoting social justice.

== Books ==
- Durkhanai Ayubi (2020), Parwana: Recipes and Stories from an Afghan Kitchen, Allen & Unwin, ISBN 9781761060397
- Durkhanai Ayubi (2026), She Who Tastes, Knows: A Memoir of Food, Exile and Awakening, Murdoch Books Pty Limited, ISBN 9781761500121
