= Mohammad Din Zakhil =

محمد دين زاخيل Mohammad Din Zakhil
- Born: Afghanistan
- Genres: Ghazals; Music of Afghanistan
- Occupation(s): Composer, singer, poet
- Labels: Various

Mohammad Din Zakhil (محمد دين زاخيل – famous as Ustad Zakhil) was a singer/composer from Afghanistan.

Zakhil composed over 670 songs for many Afghan singers. Da Zamoong Zeeba Watan, Pa Loyo Ghro Banday Ra Taw Shwal Toofanona, and Sanga Meena Zma Sta Wa are a few of his classic compositions.

The lyrics and music of "Wro Wro Kaigda Qadamoona Ashna", which were used in a Hollywood movie, The Passion of Christ, were also composed and created by him. The song was originally recorded by his wife, Qamar Gula, in the Radio Afghanistan studio in 1974. After the release of the movie, the Zakhil family hired a lawyer to file a copyright lawsuit against Icon Productions, Mel Gibson (the director) and John Debney (the music director of the film).

The movie and music directors of The Passion of Christ were later sued.

Ustad Zakhil was an ethnic Pashtun.
