= Abdul Rauf Benawa =

Abdul Rauf Benawa (1913–1985; Pashto: عبدالرووف بېنوا) was an Afghan writer, poet, journalist, historian and social activist. One of his major works is a series of educational poems called "Sad Reflection" (1957).

== Works ==
Benawa wrote many works of literature. Some are:

- 1941: There is no time (nelarem Wacht ")
- 1942: Virgin unfortunate (Nâmurâda ndželej ")
- 1947: Literary Theory (Adabi funun ")
- 1948: Thoughts sorrowful (Prêsâna afkâr ")
- 1961: Contemporary Writers (likwâl Hosanna ")
- 1966: Mystery of the heart ("The zrre chwâla)

== Death ==
He died in exile in the United States.

== Sources ==
- Danțiș, Gabriela - Scriitori străini, Editura Științifică și Enciclopedică București, 1981
- Сайт, Detailed Biography in Russian
