= Amir Jan Sabori =

Amir Jan Sabori امیرجان صبوری
- Born: Amir Jan; Herat, Afghanistan
- Origin: Afghanistan
- Occupations: Singer, composer, songwriter

Amir Jan Sabori (Persian: امیرجان صبوری) is a singer, musician, composer, and poet from Herat, Afghanistan. There is a documentary about him called Golden Dream. Amir Jan Sabori had a long hiatus in his career but returned in 2005 with his album This Is Life. He is also the uncle of emerging singer Tawab Arash and has done production for him. He is an ethnic Farsiwan From Herat province.

== Discography ==
- 2005: This Is Life (Afghanistan - Dari: زندگی همین است Zindagi Hameen Ast)
