= Qurban Ali Mirzaee =

Afghan actor

Qurban Ali Mirzaee (also known as Baba Mazari) is an Afghan actor credited with acting in more than 100 Afghan films and 150 TV productions.

In 2010 he directed The Simorgh Ensemble that performed at the South Asian Theater in Delhi.

In 2016, he fled Afghanistan because of Taliban threats. He took refuge in India where he continues his artistic endeavors.
