= Seema Tarana =

Afghan singer originally from Parwan

Seema Tarana سیما ترانه
- Origin: Kabul, Afghanistan
- Genres: Afghan music
- Occupation: Singer
- Instrument: Tabla

Seema Tarana also spelled as Sima Tarana (Dari: سیما ترانه) is an Afghan singer originally from Parwan Province. She is popular in Afghanistan and Tajikistan. She currently resides in Canada.
