= Bakht Zamina =

Afghan singer

Bakht Zamina (Pashto: بخت زمينه, died on July 15, 1981) was a famous Afghan singer who performed in major Pashto music events in Kabul.

== Life and death ==
Bakht Zamina was from Nangarhar. She moved to Kabul to carry on her music career. Zamina was famous for both folk and pop Pashto songs. She was a sympathizer with the People's Democratic Party of Afghanistan, singing some songs in support for them. She has long been forgotten by media mainly due to political reasons, over the decades following her death. Bakht Zamina is believed to have died in 1981, due to tuberculosis. However, some speculate that she was murdered by Afghan mujahideen after she sang her famous song "Ay Sarbaza Yara". The true nature of her death has not been confirmed, as it had been shrouded with rumors.

== Work ==
Some of her songs were:

- Ma La Ta Juda Kawena
- Yara Ghamjan ba Shay
- Zama Khoga Janana
- Bey Dildara Mey
- Zama da Meene Yaara
- Raasha Raasha
- Khalqi Akhtar dey Mazidar
- Pashto Tapey
- Khaista Zaan me Jorr Karay de
- Ay Sarbaza Yaraa
- Khejja pa Morchal Bande
