= Naghma (singer) =

Afghan singer (born 23 April 1954)

Naghma نغمه ښاپېرۍ
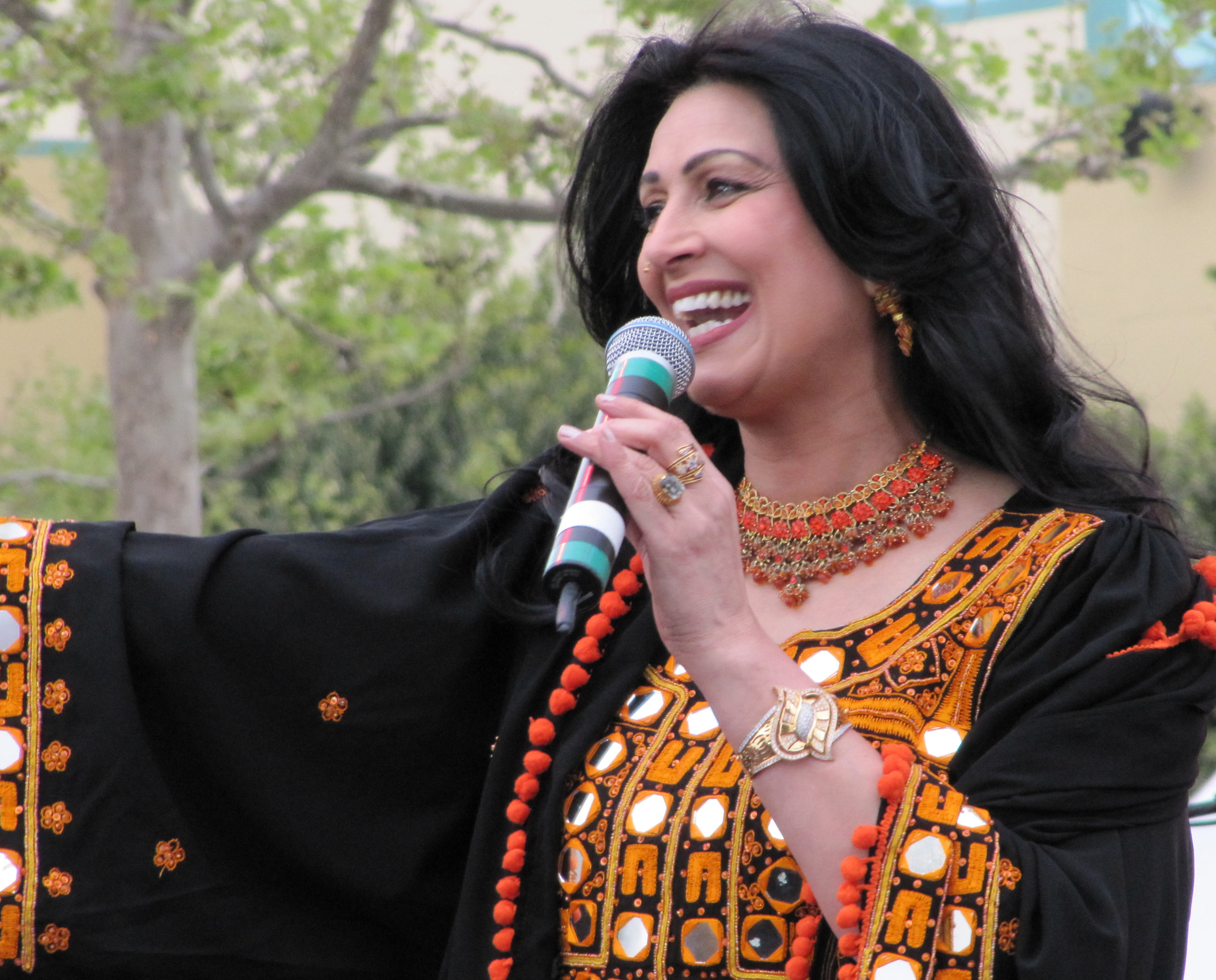
- Naghma singing during a 2010 Nowruz celebration at Fairplex in Pomona, California

Background information
- Born: Shahpari or Shahpary; 1 January 1954 (age 72); Kandahar, Kingdom of Afghanistan
- Genres: Folklore, pop
- Years active: 1980–present
- Labels: Afghan Vision Records; Ariana Records
- Awards: Pride of Performance

Naghma (/ˈnæɡmə/; Pashto: نغمه ښاپېرۍ, IPA: [ˈnaɣmɐ ʂɑpeˈrəɪ]; (born 23 April 1954) is an Afghan singer who started her career in the early 1980s. Similar to that of Sonny & Cher, she sang alongside Mangal during the 1980s and early 1990s. She sings mainly in Pashto, but also sings in Dari as well, the country's two main languages.

== Early years ==
Naghma stated in a 2019 interview on Mashriq TV that she was born in Kandahar, Afghanistan. Her exact birthplace and date of birth are not reported. She was the eldest daughter in a family of five boys and three girls, and was given the nickname Šaperai (ښاپېرۍ). Her father was Sayed Suleiman Shah, a Pashtun from Deh Sabz District of Kabul Province. Her mother Bibi Mashala was a Pashtun from Kandahar. Both of Afghanistan's major languages were spoken in their house. Her father died when Naghma was 7 or 8 years old. As a young girl, she developed an interest in music since elementary school in Kandahar. At the age of around sixteen years, she moved to Kabul with her paternal uncle and continued her secondary education at Rabia Balkhi Lece, where she began performing as a vocalist in a girl's band. This was around the time of the April Revolution of 1978, when the People's Democratic Party of Afghanistan took control of Kabul and other parts of the country. Her five brothers were killed while serving in the Afghan army. One of her two sisters, Gulpari, was killed in Kabul in the early 1990s.

== Career ==
A year before finishing high school she married Mangal, an already popular Afghan singer from Laghman Province. They were instant celebrities, recording hits that are famous to this day. Her early songs were based on southern Afghan music, most of which were folkloric in nature. She additionally sang a song for the Afghan Air Force and Air Defense, titled "Lalaya Hawabaza (Beloved Pilot) in which she stood in the cabin of an Afghan Mil Mi-8.

She and the family left Afghanistan to reside in India for about two years and from there to Dubai in the UAE. After staying there for two years, the family proceeded to Pakistan. There, they became very successful with an enthusiastic crowd of Afghan exiles who were nostalgic for their native music. Her financial situation had improved significantly by this time. In 2000, the family immigrated to the United States as refugees. Naghma and Mangal connected with the Afghan-American community of Northern California.

In March 2013, she became the first Afghan to receive the Tamgha-e-Imtiaz and the Pride of Performance, the highest Pakistani Presidential Awards handed to artists, sportsmen, scientists and writers. She was also known as the host of Sorood-e Dehkada, a popular music show on Noor TV.

== Personal life ==
Naghma and Mangal divorced in 2006, and later she married the son of Mohammad Nabi Mohammadi of Logar Province. They also broke off the marriage. Naghma has four children: Anwar, Khyber, Lima and Madina.

== Discography ==
She has recorded over 500 songs in Afghanistan, Pakistan, and also in the United States over 32 years. This list is incomplete

Album: Bachi Hamsaya

- Bachi Hamsaya
- Chiching Wa
- Aros
- O Bacha
- Maida Maida
- Nazi Jan
- Ba Yin Sazi Mahali
- Ghataghani
- Shekesta Chelamey
- Imroz
- Tu Ra Meparastam
- O Dilbar Janim
- O Bacha
- Jama Narinje

Album: Best of Naghma

- Charsi Halika Stargi
- Naghma Ram Ding Ta Tis Tang Bokonem
- Janana ke Pashton
- Halka Daroghjan Mee
- Raghlay Yama Damor
- Za Ba Gidi Rawdim
- Chita Che Zi Mat
- Raza Da Zandgi Sra
- Yara Rana Wrak Nashi
- Janana Rasha Da Shamali
- Hagha Sra Oshan
- Allah Wi Zamazda

Album: Kabul Nazaneen

- Salam Afghanistan
- Anaram Anaram
- Delbar Jan
- Ghataghani
- Yaram Nest
- Darbigeri
- O Dilbar Janam
- Nazi Jan
- O Bachi Afghan
- Maida Maida Baran
- Em Roz Che Roz Ast

Album: O Khoda Jan

- Az America Wa Alman
- O Khuda Jan
- Sharshara Baran
- Shab Amadam
- Bebe Roko Jan
- Kashki Ma
- Man Dokhtari Sherazam
- Mara Az Ashiqi Bas
- Mohabbat
- Pesta Forosh

Popular Singles:

- Mazdigar De Ka Nade
- O Bacha Jane Bacha
- Lalaya Hawa Baza
- Kandahar Halika
- Adam Khana Charsi
- Mohabbat
- Lalo Lalo
- Mala Chal Ne Razi
- Akh Janan Me Laro
- Zema Afghanistan
- Loya Khudaya
- Orbal Chapa Kra Bya Rasta
- Akhshe na ni na (Attan De Gada Da)
- Mubarak Di Sha Akhtar
- Lalai de
- Dilbar Zalim Zalim
- Rasha Khwala Rasha
- Wa Grana
- Bangri
- Che Watan Afghanistan She
- Yarana
- Yaar Khob De
- De Zowani Khubona
- Nor e Newranawo
- Ay Da Watan Da Abay Roka Zoya
- Afghani Mashoma

Contributing artist

- The Rough Guide to the Music of Afghanistan, 2010

== See also ==
- List of Afghan singers
- Afghan Americans
