= Nainawaz =

Afghan artist, poet, composer (1935–1979)

- Born: Fazel Ahmad Khan Zekrya; 1935
- Died: 1979 (aged 43–44); Kabul, Democratic Republic of Afghanistan
- Occupations: Artist; poet; composer
- Writing career
- Period: 70s late 80s
- Genre: Pop

Fazel Ahmad Zekrya (Farsi Dari: فضل احمد ذکریا; 1935–1979), known professionally as Nainawaz (Pashto/Dari: نينواز) (or Ustad Nainawaz) was a renowned Afghan artist, poet and composer. He has composed some of the most iconic pieces in Afghan popular music.

== Background ==
Nainawaz was one of the nine sons of politician, poet and writer Sardar Haji Faiz Muhammad Khan Zikeria ruling family. He was born in the Yakatoot district of Kabul. Nainwaz attended the elite Lycée Esteqlal in Kabul. In his early teens, he taught himself how to play the accordion. He also wrote poems and composed melodies. His adopted stage name "Nainawaz" means Ney (an End-blown flute) player in Persian. Nainwaz graduated from Kabul University, Law and Political Faculty.

Nainawaz has one son, Amir Khusru Nainawaz, and one daughter Sahar Khanum, married in 1985 to Ehsan Aman, an Afghan-American singer from Helmand Province.

== Career ==
Nainawaz is credited with adding modern pop elements to Afghan music. He produced countless hit compositions sung by many renowned Afghan artists such as the Ahmad Zahir, Ahmad Wali, Mahwash, Sarban, Awalmir, and many others. Many of his compositions have a Mystical quality and are set to poems by Rumi, Hafez, and Lahuti. Nainawaz was a mentor and teacher to Ahmad Zahir, the well-known Afghan singer.

== Death ==
Nainawaz took part in the Bala Hissar uprising against the Khalq communist regime as a part of the Revolutionary Group of the Peoples of Afghanistan in 1979. He was arrested and executed by the Khalq regime.
