= Khushnood Nabizada =

Afghan journalist, media owner and entrepreneur (born 1987)

- خوشنود نبی‌زاده
- Born: Khushnood Nabizada; March 27, 1987 (age 39); Shibar District, Bamyan Province, Afghanistan
- Occupation: Founder / owner of Khaama Press
- Website: Official website Twitter Facebook

Khushnood Nabizada (born March 27, 1987) is an Afghan journalist, diplomat, peace campaigner, and entrepreneur. He is the founder and owner of Khaama Press, an Afghanistan-based news agency that reports specific political issues of the Afghanistan region.

== Early years and education ==
Nabizada was born on 27 March 1987 in the Shibar District of Bamyan Province in central Afghanistan. He is an ethnic Hazara and follower of Shia Islam.

Around the age of eight, his family moved to Puli Khumri in Baghlan Province. When Nabizada was in 5th grade of school, he along with his entire family migrated to Rawalpindi, Pakistan, due to Taliban rule. He returned to Afghanistan in 2003, during the presidency of Hamid Karzai.

Nabizada graduated from Habibia High School in 2006. He obtained a bachelor's degree in business administration from Kardan University in 2012. Later he obtained a master's degree in International Relation from Kateb University in Kabul.

== Career ==
In October 2010, Nabizada founded The Khaama Press News Agency, one of the largest online news services in Afghanistan at the time. Khaama Press publishes in English, Persian and Pashto languages.

In 2011 he founded an IT company under the name of Barg Sabz that provides web designing, web hosting and domain registration services for the individuals, companies, and organizations operating in Afghanistan.

Nabizada worked as Senior Business Executive at Insurance Corporation of Afghanistan from 2007 to early 2014. In the meantime, he managed to supervise and preside operations of Khaama Press and Barg Sabz Web Designing firm. He had become a member of the National United Party of Afghanistan.

Khaama Press remains as a popular news agencies. Khaama's web portal was recognized as the most visited news website in 2020.

Nabizada joined the Afghanistan government in 2016 and assumed office as chief of staff to the Ministry of Urban Development and Housing on May 29, 2016. The recruitment process for this key position is approved by President Mohammad Ashraf Ghani.

Nabizada was appointed as chief of staff to the State Ministry for Peace on September 7, 2020. The recruitment process for this key position was approved by the then-President Ashraf Ghani.

== The Khaama Press News Agency ==
Nabizada decided to establish Khaama Press when Afghanistan entered a new era with the assistance of the international community in 2001 after the fall of ‘Taliban’, an extremist religious group that led the country for 5 years. Since then, ‘Afghanistan’ received a large number of development funds from the International society, but most of these grants were not spent in a ‘transparent’ manner as a result of poor monitoring and control. He said that the media and press agencies are a powerful tool to keep eyes on the executive and implementing agencies, promoting ‘transparency’. Therefore, he established Khaama Press in October 2010 to help the journalism and freedom of speech in Afghanistan.

== The Canada Now ==
In March 2020, Nabizada and his friend and former colleague Ahmad Shah Ghani Zada established a news portal for US & Canada under the name of The Canada Now. The agency's operation was interrupted for almost a year due to the COVID-19 pandemic but resumed in May 2021. The online news portal covers World, US & Canada, Business, Politics, Entertainment, Sports and Immigration. The Canada Now publishes news and reports on its web portal, social media accounts including Twitter (@TheCanadaNow) and Facebook (The Canada Now).

== Escaping bomb blast ==
Nabizada survived a bomb blast on February 1, 2021. The incident happened in PD10, Kabul, while he was on the way to work. Several national and international agencies, including Afghan and NATO officials, have condemned the attack.

== Immigrating to the United States ==
In August 2021, during Operation Allies Refuge, Nabizada and his family all escaped in American military planes from Afghanistan to Wisconsin in the United States. They later moved to Virginia. Nabizada and his wife Razia have two daughters (Artisa and Armita) and one son (Arash). He advocates for freedom of speech and human rights in Afghanistan.

== Quote ==
Emigration/Immigration is never a fantasy, but a compulsion to escape death.

— Khushnood Nabizada

The quote has been used for the first time by Nabizada in his life story published by Richmond Times-Dispatch in January 2022. He has said it when he wanted to express his feelings about how hard it was for him to leave everything behind and flee from his homeland Afghanistan in August 2021.
