= Ahmad Zahir =

Singer, songwriter and composer

Ahmad Zahir احمد ظاهر

Background information
- Born: Ahmad Toryalai Zahir; 14 June 1946; Kabul, Kingdom of Afghanistan
- Origin: Laghman, Kingdom of Afghanistan
- Died: 14 June 1979 (aged 33) Salang Tunnel, Parwan/Baghlan, Democratic Republic of Afghanistan
- Genres: Romantic, pop, classic
- Occupations: singer; songwriter; composer; musician
- Instruments: vocal; harmonium; piano; accordion; acoustic guitar
- Years active: 1964–1979
- Website: Ahmad Zahir's Songs
- Father: Abdul Zahir

Ahmad Zahir (Pashto/Dari: احمد ظاهر; 14 June 1946 – 14 June 1979) was an Afghan singer, songwriter and composer. Dubbed the "Elvis of Afghanistan", he is widely considered the all-time greatest singer of Afghanistan. The majority of his songs were in Dari Persian followed by Pashto, with a few in Russian, Hindi and English.

Zahir recorded at least 14 studio albums before his abrupt death on his 33rd birthday in 1979. His music blended folk music, Persian literature, Indian classical music and Western pop and rock styles. Among Afghans, he is considered an icon of Afghan music and is widely regarded as the country's greatest musician of all time, posthumously reclaiming immortal fame due to his contributions and influence on music in Afghanistan. He has also become an icon of peacetime pre-war Afghanistan.

== Early years ==
Ahmad Zahir was born on 14 June 1946 (Jauza 24, 1325 of the Jalali calendar) in Kabul, Afghanistan, to an ethnic Pashtun family from Laghman Province. His father, Abdul Zahir, was a royal court doctor who served as Minister of Health followed by Prime Minister of Afghanistan between 1971 and 1972. He was a speaker of the parliament and an influential figure in King Zahir Shah's era who helped write the 1964 Constitution of Afghanistan. Ahmad Zahir had an older sister, Zahira Zahir, who would later be known as the hairdresser of U.S. President Ronald Reagan and others.

== Career ==
Zahir attended Habibia High School in Kabul and formed "the amateur band of Habibia High School" including Omar Sultan on guitar, Farid Zaland on congas, and Akbar Nayab on piano. Zahir played the accordion and sang. They performed locally during public holidays such as Nowruz, Eid ul-Fitr and Afghan Independence Day. Zahir gained considerable popularity in Kabul as a talented singer with a soulful voice. His baritone chest voice and evocative singing gave him the title of "Bulbul-e Habibya", or "the Nightingale of Habibia".

He attended and graduated from the Daru'l-Malimeen (Teachers' College) in Kabul, and studied for two years in India to get a degree as an English instructor. After his return from India, Zahir got a job as a journalist for The Kabul Times, but soon began work on his first album. He worked closely with Afghan composers Nainawaz and Taranasaz. His first recorded song, Gar Kuni Yak Nizara, was his own composition, blending Indian raga with western pop rhythms.

Zahir worked with mentors such as Ismail Azami (saxophonist), Nangalai (trumpeter), Abdullah Etemadi (drummer), and other musicians including Salim Sarmast, Nainawaz, Taranasaz and Mashour Jamal. He recorded over 22 albums in the 1970s. His songs were noted for their mellifluous tone, poetic style, compelling depth, and passionate emotional evocation. Zahir was on the scene of Afghan music for only 10 years at the most; yet, managed to record more than 30 albums. This was and is unique in any music industry around the world. All of these albums were successful and widely accepted (to this date) by everyone. The musicians managed to complete these recordings almost 40 years ago with almost no technology of today's world, and all was done in live recordings.

A controversy regarding the relation between his song Tanha Shodam Tanha and Claude Morgan's song El Bimbo (1974) exists. Some sources date the song and the album Lylee on which it appeared to 1971, which would make Morgan's version a cover, and some (mostly based on a previous version of this article) date it to 1977, reversing the relationship.

Because of his musical family background, Zahir helped to establish music as a more respected profession which in turn led to the founding of The Kabul Music School in 1974.

Following the Saur Revolution, Zahir criticized the leaders of the new communist regime in three songs in resistance to their oppression, modelling himself after one of his heroes, John Lennon, who used rock music for anti-war resistance in the west.

=== Musical style and contributions ===
Of all the Afghan musicians, Ahmad Zahir is the person most closely associated with creating the distinct Afghan musical style. Following in the footsteps of the renowned Afghan singer Sarban, Zahir played a pivotal role in shaping the Afghan musical style. A highly educated and well-travelled man, Zahir was an extraordinarily gifted musician with an overwhelming passion for music and the arts from an early age. By the time he was 16, he had learnt to play various instruments, including the harmonium, guitar and accordion (his favourite instrument). His privileged and affluent background — his father, Abdul Zahir, was an ambassador, a minister and later Prime Minister of Afghanistan — gave him the opportunity to travel and experience the musical revolutions occurring in the United States, Europe and India in the 1960s and 1970s. An avid listener of all genres, he incorporated elements of Western pop, rock and jazz, Indian music, Arabic and Iranian music, French and Italian belle chanson and Spanish flamenco, as well as Afghan folk, into his songs.

Although the distinct Afghan sound (as opposed to Indian classical music, Afghan folk music and Western music) was created by the Persian singer Sarban in partnership with the legendary composer Salim Sarmast, it was Zahir who popularised it and brought it to the attention of a wider audience. Sarban's songs, such as 'Ahesta Bero', 'Khorsheede Man', 'Ay Sarban', 'Mushjke Taza Mebartad' and 'Dar Daaman-e-Sahra', are considered pearls of Afghan Persian music. However, the sombre poetry, complex music and numerous other subtleties of these songs could only be appreciated by a minority of highly educated and erudite Afghans. These songs were not widely enjoyed by the general public. Ahmad Zahir simplified the lyrical, compositional and orchestral aspects of the musical tradition of Sarban and Sarmast. This does not mean he made the style simplistic, but rather that he made it accessible, thus making it hugely popular with the masses, especially the young people of Afghanistan. Zahir's song "Khoda Buwat Yaret", for instance, is a great example of an unmistakably Afghan musical sound. The lyrics are understandable to almost all Persian speakers, regardless of their education or knowledge of the Persian poetic tradition. Yet the poeticism, imagery and emotional impact are as powerful as the best of Sarban's songs. As a result of the accessibility of Ahmad Zahir's songs, the vast majority of future Afghan singers who sang in the unique Afghan style were influenced primarily by Zahir and not Sarban (whose songs few had heard). Thus, Zahir can truly be credited as the singer responsible for realising a unique Afghan musical language, separate from Indian, Iranian, Western and folkloric traditions.

Zahir's debut album was recorded with Radio Kabul. It is the first Afghan album to fall within the Western music genre, consisting mostly of pop songs. However, although the rhythms, melody lines and textures of the songs were identifiable as Afghan pop, there was also a prominent Afghan (or rather, Eastern) element to them — rather than using drums, Zahir opted for the tabla to provide the songs' rhythm. The accordion, Zahir's favourite instrument and a Western instrument albeit not a pop one, features heavily on this album. The most popular song on the album was "Az Ghamat Ay Nazanin".

However, it was Zahir's second album, also recorded with Radio Kabul, that shot him to superstardom and was hailed by critics as an artistic masterpiece. Unlike the highly erudite and complex music of the Sarban & Sarmast duo, Zahir's album retains the main elements of the Afghan sound, but with a lyrical and musical language that is very popular and easily accessible. Songs such as 'Hama Yaranam', 'Rozo Shabam' (a collaboration with the renowned Afghan singer Nashenas), 'Tanha Tuyere' and 'Tora Afsoone Chashmanam' were extremely popular thanks to their accessible lyrics, which particularly appealed to young people, and their sound, which suited the Afghan musical palate perfectly.

Other Zahir albums and songs mostly continue the musical style of this album with songs like Agar Bahar Beyayad, Laili Lail Jan, Khuda buwat Yaret. Zahir was one of the first Afghan musicians not to shy away from covering great songs of other artists. He considered covering music of other artists as paying homage to their artistic brilliance. He covered a playback of the famous Indian film Bobby (which was a hit in Afghanistan at the time), Iranian songs (Sultan-e Qalbha, Hargez Hargez, Hamash Dardo Hamash Ranjo), and even some of the greats of the west Enrico Macias, Elvis Presley. This versatility and willingness to adopt musical creations of others for his own performance, greatly enhanced the merit of his own musical creations.

== Assassination ==
Ahmad Zahir was assassinated by unknown gunman from the top of a mountain on 14 June 1979, on his 33rd birthday. It was reported in the media that he was killed in a car accident around the Salang Tunnel, but some claim he was assassinated because his political stance was at odds with the Marxist government of the time; supposedly he was lured out the city by a close friend and two female accomplices and subsequently murdered. Others believe that he was murdered on the order of senior politician Hafizullah Amin or that of Amin's trusted aide Daoud Taroon due to an affair between Zahir and Amin's daughter. A large crowd of mourners attended Zahir's funeral in Kabul, clogging the city streets and bringing daily activities to a halt. He left behind a son, Rishad, from his first wife Najia, who he eventually divorced.

== Legacy ==
After his death, Zahir was considered a national hero. His tomb was destroyed by members of the Taliban in the late 1990s, but was later rebuilt by loving fans. It was renovated as recently as 2018 by fans who have established a foundation in his name in hopes of continuing his legacy.

His songs "Khuda Buwad Yaret", "Asman Khalist", "Agar Bahar Beyayad", "Laili Laili Jan", "Chashme Siya Dari", "Zim Zim (Kajaki Abroyet)" and many others, are known by the vast majority of Afghans. They are ranked as some of the greatest songs created in Afghanistan's musical history.

Zahir was listed as one of 50 golden voices in history who have made their mark internationally, according to National Public Radio (NPR).

The Academy Award–nominated American film director Sam French was selected in 2018 to direct a documentary film about Zahir's life.

== Discography ==
=== Afghan music albums ===
- Vol. 1 – Dilak am (1973)
- Vol. 2 – Bahar (1973)
- Vol. 3 – Shab ha ye zulmane (1974)
- Vol. 4 – Mother (1974)
- Vol. 5 – Awara (1975)
- Vol. 6 – Ghulam-e Qamar (1975)
- Vol. 7 – Sultan Qalbaam (1976)
- Vol. 8 – Az Ghamat Hy Nazaneen (1976)
- Vol. 9 – Gulbadaan (1971)
- Vol. 10 – Yaare Bewafa (1977)
- Vol. 11 – Lylee (1977)
- Vol. 12 – Ahmad Zahir and Jila (1978)
- Vol. 13 – Ahange Zindagee (1978)
- Vol. 14 – Shab-e Hijraan (1979) (posthumous release)

Note: Audio cassette versions of many of Zahir's Afghan Music albums are missing some songs that are present on the original vinyl records.

=== Ariana music albums ===
- Vol. 1 – Daard-e Dil (1972)
- Vol. 2 – Mosum-e Gul (1977)

Note: The original Ariana Music record albums contain many hidden tracks.

=== Music center albums ===
- Vol. 1 – Ashiq rooyat Mon (1973)
- Vol. 2 – Neshe Gashdum (1976)
- Vol. 3 – Lylee Jaan (1977)
- Vol. 4 – Ahmad Zahir Ba Sitara Haa (1977)
- Vol. 5 – To Baamanee (1978)

=== Other discography information ===
- He only recorded 2 music videos on Radio Kabul TV: "Laylee Jaan" in 1976 and "Khuda Buwat Yarret" in 1977.
- Zahir recorded several songs in Radio Kabul and Radio Afghanistan studios which later came out as albums. Eight of these albums have been released.

== See also ==
- List of Afghan singers
- Music of Afghanistan
