= Hangama =

Afghan singer

هنگامه Hangāma
- Born: Zuhra (زهره); 1960 (age 64–65); Kabul, Kingdom of Afghanistan
- Genres: Pop; Classical Music; Ghazals
- Occupation: Singer
- Years active: 1975–present

Hangāma (Dari/Pashto: هنگامه) is an Afghan singer who has been active since 1975. Besides Afghanistan, she is also known in Tajikistan and Iran. Before her emigration from Afghanistan in the 1980s, she was regarded as one of the most popular female singers of the country.

== Life and career ==
Originally born as Zuhra (Note: Persian: زهره), her mother chose the name of Hangāma for her when she became a singer. Raised in a music-loving family, she started her music career in 1975 at only 15 years old. She was a music student of the acclaimed Ustad Nainawaz.

In late 1970s and early 1980s, she emerged with Ahmad Wali as a very popular musical duo and later became the unrivaled singer-couple in the mid-1980s. The duo recorded their first few songs in Afghanistan with the accompanying videos becoming immensely popular, and the couple additionally sang a song for the Sarandoy gendarmerie of the Democratic Republic of Afghanistan alongside other gendarmes. Their songs remain classics of the Afghan musical archives.

After leaving Afghanistan for Germany in 1985, Hangāma and Wali got married. She gave birth to a son named Massieh in 1986.

Hangāma won the ATN Award as a Best Female singer on November 29, 2008 and she was also nominated for best female singer on Noor TV awards in April 2008 however she was outcompeted by the Afghan singer Naghma who instead won the award.

== Concerts ==
After leaving Germany, she has been having lots of concerts alone and with singers like Najim Nawabi, Nasrat Parsa, Leila Forouhar, Naim Popal, Freshta Samah, Haider Salim, Walid Soroor and Waheed Soroor.

In 2005, Hangāma returned to Afghanistan for a round of concerts in Mazar Sharif and Kabul. Reportedly she was applauded for her contribution to the music of Afghanistan over the years. Since then she has been having concerts and TV shows at least once a year in different TV stations in Kabul.
