= Nasrat Parsa =

Afghan singer (1968–2005)

Nasrat Parsa Jan
- Born: Nasrat Ali Parsa; February 22, 1968; Kabul, Kingdom of Afghanistan
- Died: May 8, 2005 (aged 37) Vancouver, Canada
- Genres: Soft rock, pop, ghazals, classical
- Occupation: Singer
- Instruments: Tabla, harmonium
- Years active: 1987–2005
- Labels: Ariana Records; Negah Entertainment

Nasrat Parsa (Dari: نصرت پارسا, February 22, 1968 – May 8, 2005) was an Afghan singer. Up until his death, he continued his music in exile from Hamburg, Germany, occasionally touring other countries.

== Death ==
On May 7, 2005, Nasrat Parsa performed a concert in Vancouver, Canada, on the occasion of Mother's Day, opening a comprehensive tour that was scheduled to include several cities in North America.

Following the concert, Nasrat was with his brother, Najib Parsa outside their hotel. They were approached by three young male fans, who asked for the singer's autograph and to take a picture with him. One of the men, 19 years old at the time, then punched Nasrat in the face. The punch caused Nasrat to lose his balance and he fell down onto four concrete stairs. The reason he punched Nasrat was because he told Nasrat to play a "mast" (energetic) song, but since it was mothers day he didn't do it and wanted to play more "ghazal" (calm) songs. The guy didn't appreciate it. The severity of his brain injuries resulted in his death the next day.

The man who punched him was found guilty of manslaughter and was given a conditional sentence of 2 years of house arrest and 3 years of probation.
