= Rukhshana =

Afghan singer (c.1940–2020)

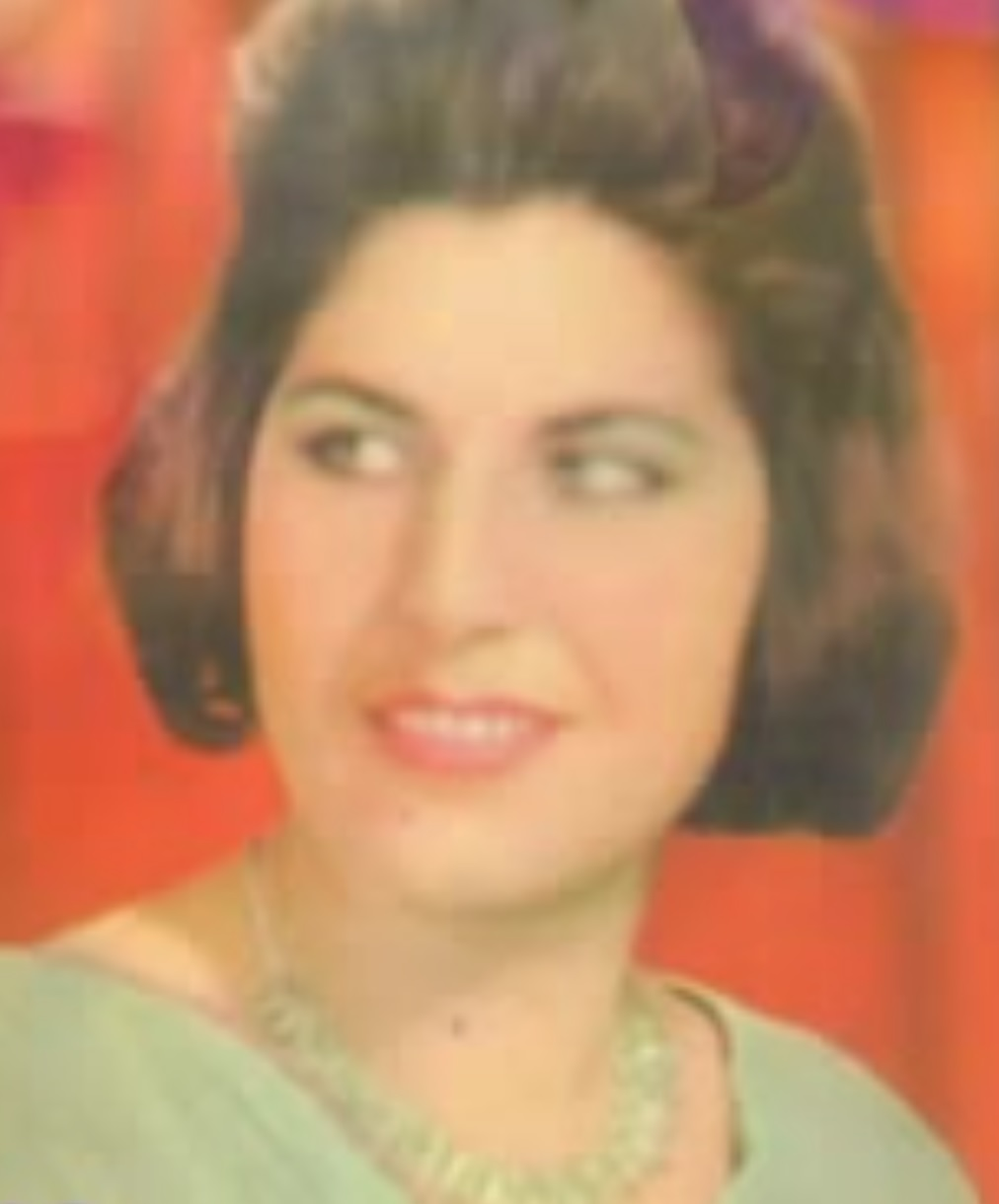
- Rukhshana in the ca. 1950s

Background information
- Birth name: Hamida Assil
- Born: c. 1940; Kabul, Kingdom of Afghanistan
- Died: December 20, 2020 (aged 80)
- Genres: Pop
- Occupation: Singer
- Labels: Aryan Records

Hamida Assil (c. January 1, 1940 – December 20, 2020), better known as Rukhshana, was an Afghan singer. Referred to as one of the first Afghan female singers, she earned her recognition during the 1950s and 1970s.

== Biography ==
Rukhshana (born as Hamida) was born in Kabul, the daughter of Assil Khan Waziri, a four star general in the Afghan Army. She belonged to the Pashtun Wazir tribe. Their family were originally from the southern parts of Afghanistan and later migrated to Kabul. She is credited with being the first Afghan woman to remove the chador to pursue her career. She performed for royalty, celebrities, and films (e.g. Shah of Iran, Czech Republic, Gandhi, Lance Armstrong).

At the height of her popularity in the 1950s and 1960s, Rukhshana's posters were widely distributed in Kabul, and her photos graced countless covers of calendars and magazines. She had a wider fan base over other singers as she was bilingual and could reach a larger segment of Afghan society. Her music includes songs both in Pashto, her native tongue, and Dari language. She gave an interview with BBC London and allowed her photographs to appear in a newspaper.

She resided in Simi Valley before she died on December 20, 2020.
