= List of Afghan artists =

This is a list of artists who were born in the Afghanistan or whose artworks are closely associated with that country. Artists are listed by field of study and then by last name in alphabetical order, and they may be listed more than once, if they work in many fields of study.

== Architects ==
- Zakia Wardak, architect, politician, and businesswoman

== Painters ==
- Khadim Ali (born 1978), Pakistani-born Australian painter, of Afghani-Hazaras descent
- Abdul Ghafoor Breshna (1907–1974), painter, music composer, poet, and film director
- Shamsia Hassani (born 1988), graffiti artist and professor
- Jalaluddin Jalal (1923–1977), writer, poet and painter
- Karim Shah Khan (1919– c. late-1980s), Realism painter
- Khair Mohammad Khan Yari (1901–1976), painter
- Akbar Khurasani (born 1961), Afghan-born Ukrainian painter
- Mohammad Maimangi (1873–1935), Realism painter
- Hafiz Pakzad (born 1955), Realism painter
- Nasrollah Sarvari (1942–2017), Realism painter

=== Miniature painters ===
- Kamāl ud-Dīn Behzād (c. 1455/60–1535), painter of miniatures, head of the royal ateliers in Herat and Tabriz during the late Timurid and early Safavid Persian periods
- Samira Kitman (born 1984), calligrapher and miniaturist, resides in England
- Dust Muhammad (late 15th century), painter of miniatures, calligrapher, and art historian

== Photographers ==
- Rada Akbar (born 1988), Afghan-born conceptual artist, and photographer, living in exile
- Massoud Hossaini (born 1981), photojournalist
- Farzana Wahidy (born 1984), documentary photographer and photojournalist

== Printmakers ==
- Aatifi (born 1965), Afghan-born German contemporary painter, printmaker and calligrapher

== Sculptors ==
- Malina Suliman (born 1990), metalworker, graffiti artist, and painter,

== See also ==
- List of Afghans
- List of Afghan women artists
