= Afghan art =

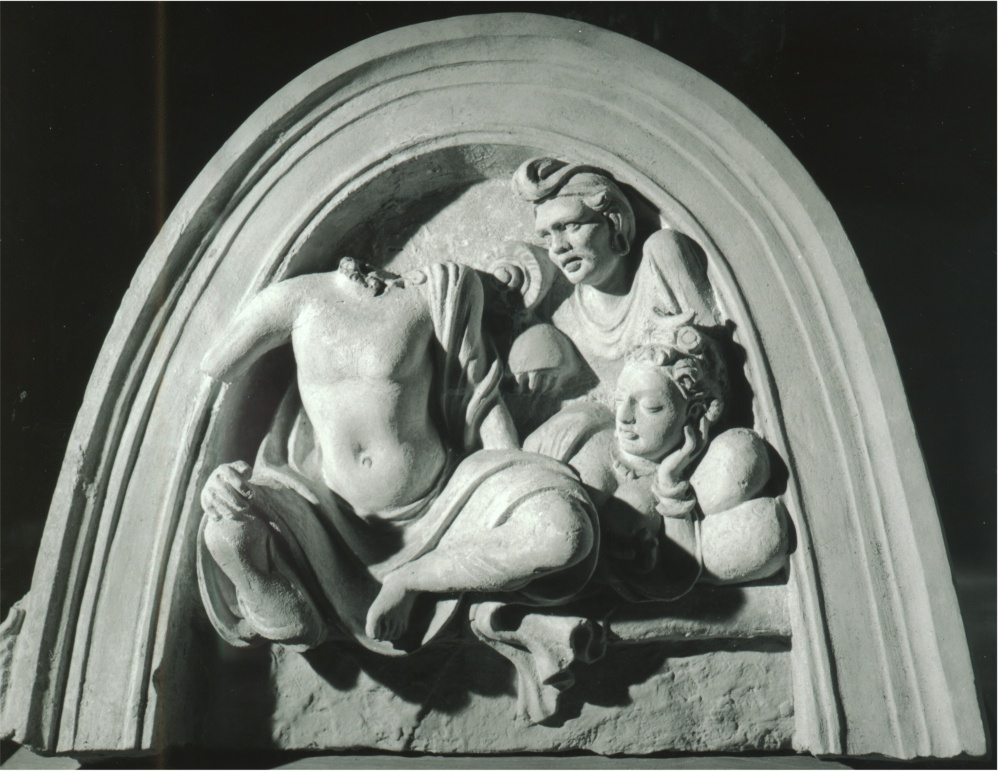
The Bodhisattva and Chandeka, Hadda, 5th century CE

Afghan art has spanned many centuries. In contrast to its independence and isolation in recent centuries, ancient and medieval Afghanistan spent long periods as part of large empires, which mostly also included parts of modern Pakistan and north India, as well as Iran. Afghan cities were often sometimes among the capitals or main cities of these, as with the Kushan Empire, and later the Mughal Empire. In addition some routes of the Silk Road to and from China pass through Afghanistan, bringing influences from both the east and west.

One of the most significant periods is the Gandharan art made between the 1st and 7th centuries developing out of Greco-Buddhist art. With the arrival of Islam, later Afghanistan was for long periods part of Persianate states, and its art was often an important part of Persian art and Islamic art in general.

Since the 1900s, the nation began to use Western techniques in art. Afghanistan's art in many media was originally almost entirely done by men, although women were greatly involved in other media, but recently women are entering the arts programs at Kabul University. Art is largely centered at the National Museum of Afghanistan, the National Gallery of Afghanistan and the National Archives of Afghanistan in Kabul. There are a number of art schools in the country. The Center for Contemporary Arts Afghanistan (CCAA) in Kabul provides young people an opportunity to learn contemporary painting.

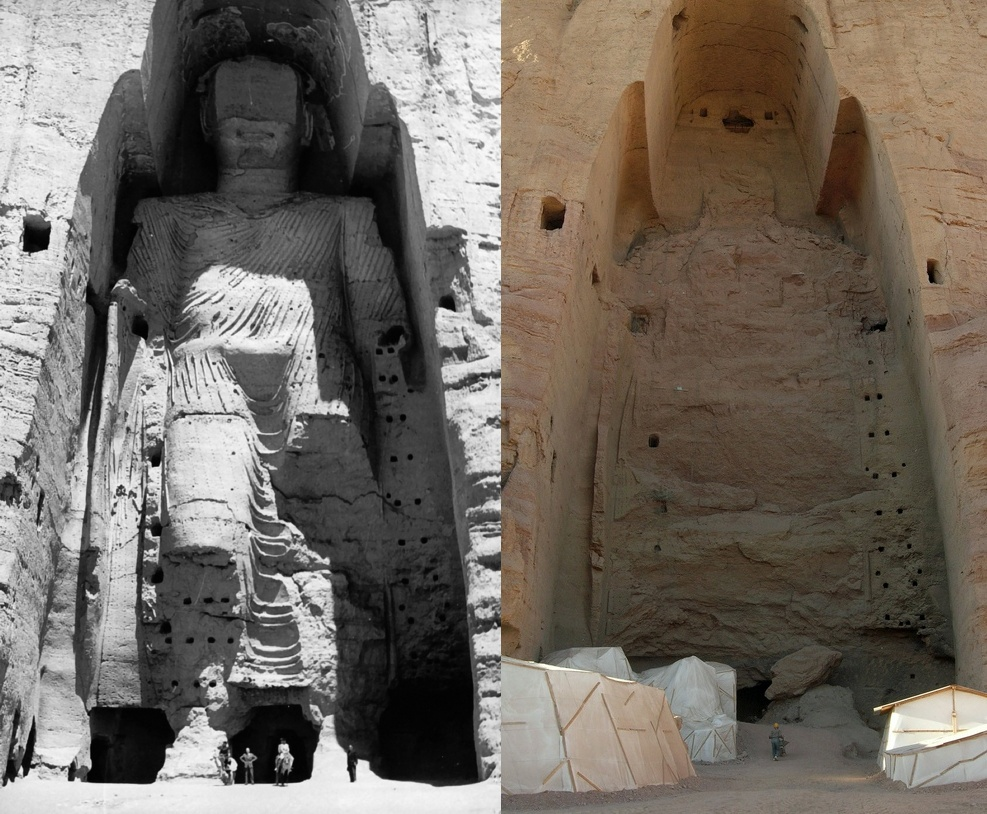
Taller of the Buddhas of Bamiyan, in 1963 and in 2008 after destruction

In recent decades, war and deliberate iconoclasm have caused a great amount of destruction of Afghanistan's artistic heritage.

== Metalwork ==
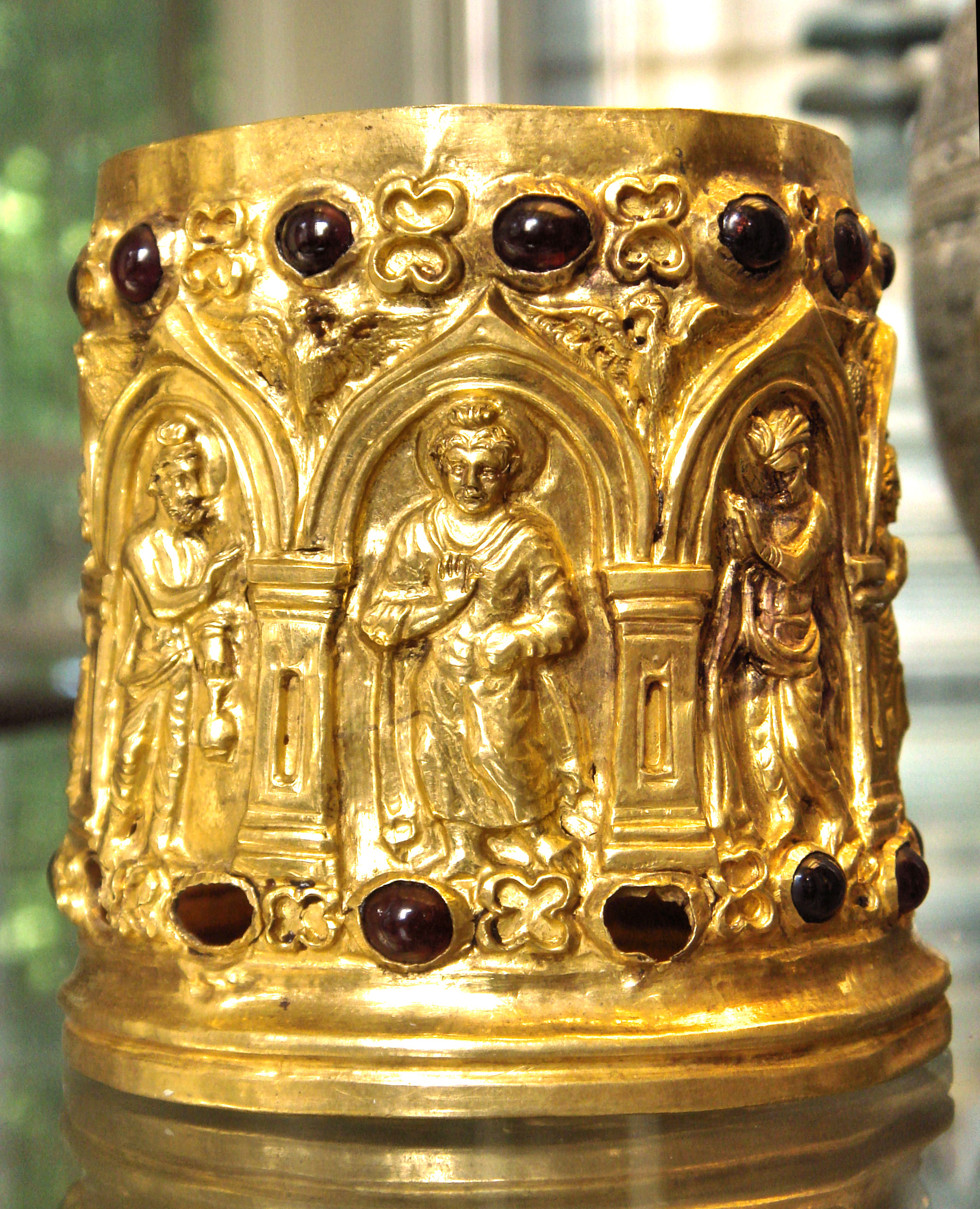
The 1st-century Bimaran Casket, a gold reliquary, with Buddha, Brahma (left) and Śakra (right)

A collection of over 20,600 gold ornaments, some of them dating back to the Bronze Age, was discovered in Afghanistan in the late 1970s. Known as the Bactrian Hoard, these coins, necklaces and other pieces of jewelry were found in burial mounts in Sheberghan in Jowzjan Province. They have been displayed in museums in the US and Europe. The Oxus Treasure, with objects probably of about 400-200 BCE, was found immediately across the border with Afghanistan, on the opposite bank of the Oxus River.

== Greco-Buddhist Art ==
Afghanistan, the core territory of the Greco-Bactrian Kingdom (c. 250-125 BCE) was a key centre of Greco-Buddhist art from the 4th Century BCE to around the 7th Century CE, when it ceased after the Islamic Conquest. Large numbers of artworks have been found at the archaeological site of Hadda, Afghanistan. The 6th-century Buddhas of Bamiyan are a well-known example of Gandhara art from this period. They were destroyed by the Taliban in 2001.

The 1st-century Bimaran casket (now British Museum) is a gold Buddhist casket for relics, an example of Kushan art, as are the Begram ivories, mostly secular survivals from a palace storeroom swept by fire in the 2nd century. These are part of the Treasure of Begram and the ivories are mounts for furniture and similar pieces, showing a very refined and luxurious palace lifestyle. Many may have been made in Gandhara, as well as India. The treasure has many imported items, including Roman enamelled glass.

== Islamic Art ==
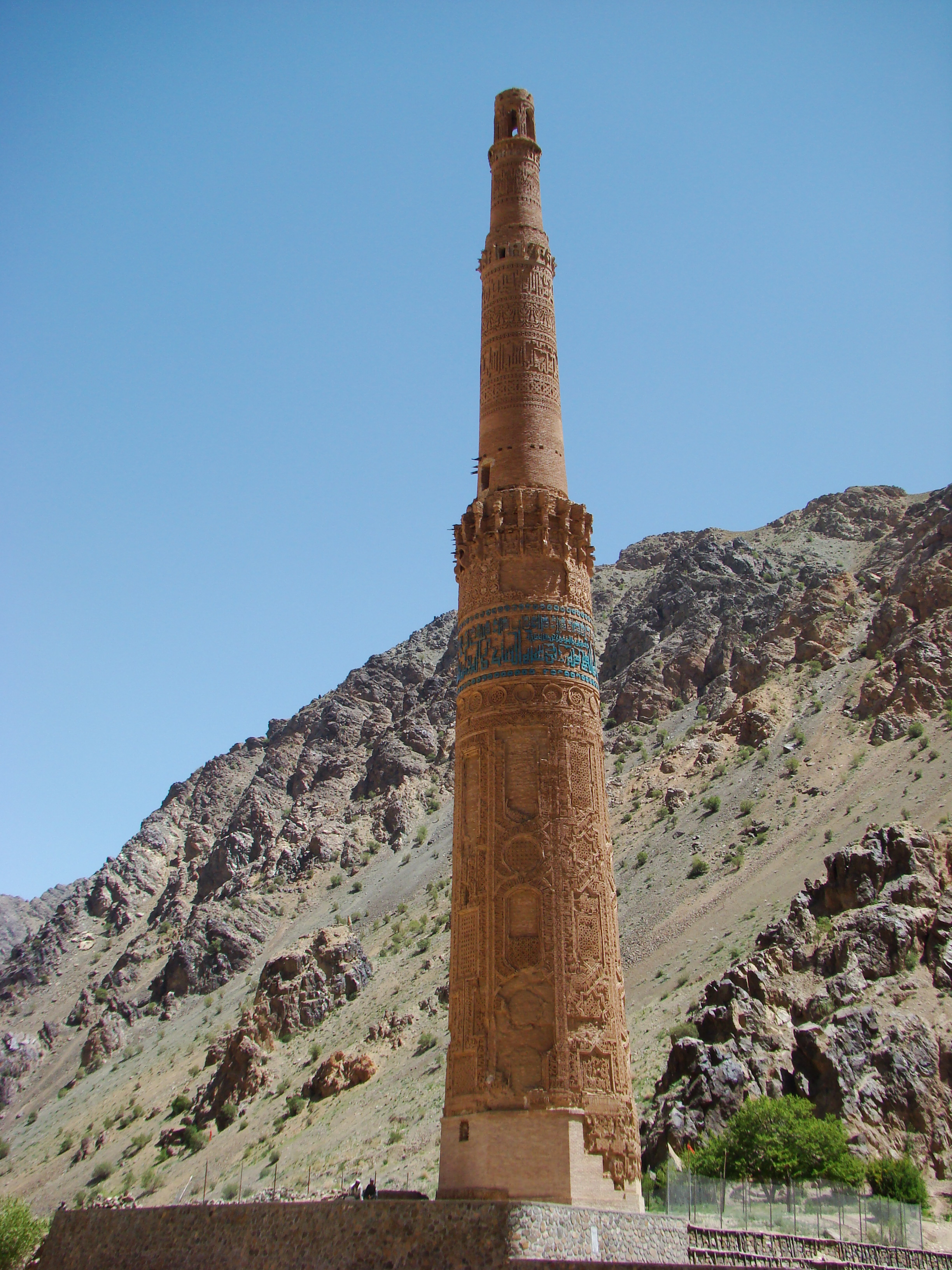
The Minaret of Jam (c. 1190)

After the Islamic conquest of Afghanistan, a slow process mostly completed from the west in the 7th century, Afghan art changed dramatically from previous Greco-Buddhist works, due to the adoption of Islam. Afghan local materials such as lapis lazuli were adapted for use in Islamic art. The Ghazni Minarets (12th century) and Minaret of Jam (c. 1190) are examples of fine brick and tile work on high minarets or "victory towers". Mosques built in Afghanistan and in the Arab world are built with elaborate tiling styles. Many of these styles were influenced from Chinese ceramics Afghanistan served as a conduit for introduction to these Chinese ceramic styles and techniques due to its strategic location on the Silk Road.

== Performance Art ==
Buz-baz is a form of musical puppetry found in Afghanistan. The puppeteer manipulates a markhor marionette while simultaneously playing a dambura.

== Fine Art ==
Afghanistan fine art was protected during the Taliban times by art masters at the Senai Art School. The professors often hid "un-Islamic" paintings from the Taliban when they would visit and inspect. Other artists used water color over oil paintings to conceal faces and images not approved by the Taliban. Since 2002, the Afghan fine art master painters have been able to conduct many more exhibitions within Central Asia and Europe. Their oil and water color paintings are often found in the realism style, as that is what most Afghans prefer.

== Modern Art ==
Since the fall of the Taliban in 2001, contemporary art has seen a resurgence in Afghanistan. Beginning in 2009, international funding for the arts has flowed into Afghanistan from the United States and Europe. In 2012, Kabul-based artist Aman Mojadidi curated a 2012 Documenta exhibit in Kabul which showcased 12 contemporary Afghan artists whose work includes digital photography, textiles, abstract painting, filmmaking and mixed media. Many modern pieces are demonstrated through street art and Graffiti, which tend to focus on themes surrounding on women empowerment, terrorism and corruption into public spaces following the removal of the Taliban from major population centers during the War of Afghanistan.

ArtLords are a group of around 45 Afghan artists who have painted murals in 19 provinces of Afghanistan. Founded in 2014 by Omaid Sharifi and Kabir Mokamel, by 2019 they had painted over 2000 murals, ranging in size from 3x5 to 6x18 meters. These murals depict activists such as Hamida Barmaki and key figures in Afghan history such as Amanullah Khan and Soraya Tarzi. Some of these art pieces include murals for international events such as remembering the murder of George Floyd and Tetsu Nakamura, influenced by and promoting international activism.They have also faced challenges in trying to create more contemporary art as

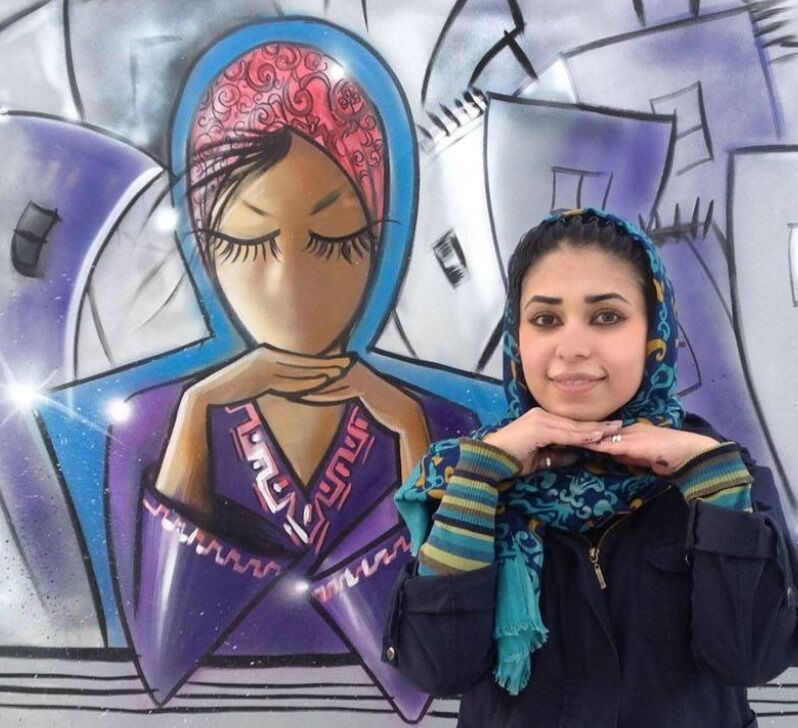
Shamsia Hassani pictured with one of her works from her Secret series

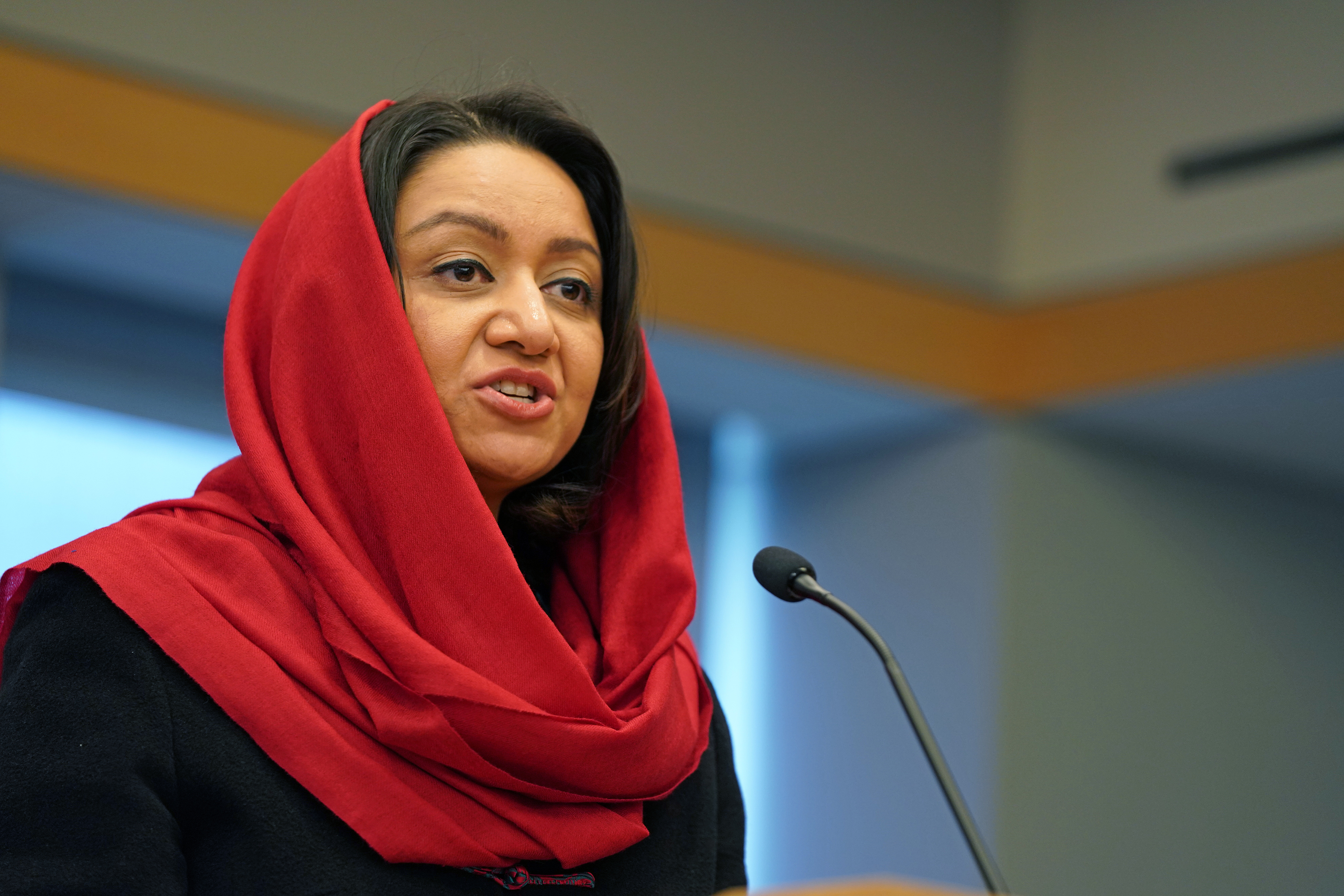
Ambassador Roya Rahmani worked with ArtLords to help promote Afghan art and culture

Modern art in Afghanistan is also being supported and influenced by new female street artists such as Shamsia Hassani, who was a part of ArtLords and also cofounded Berang Arts Organization which aimed to use graffiti and digital art to “explore issues of national and personal security”. Furthermore, the usage of graffiti to convey these messages was due in part to the fact that the artists used materials more accessible to them and using the debris as a canvas to paint over rough memories of war on the walls. This street art style also has been associated with more Western-learning practices by more traditional figures of Afghan society and this caused challenges in the process of creating more contemporary artwork. Shamsia Hassani as well as other artists such as Rada Akbar and Malina Suliman demonstrated a change in modern art that highlighted the challenges that Afghan women face in their everyday lives. Examples include works such as Malina Suliman’s “Girl In The Ice-Box” which is meant to represent how Afghan culture is holding women hostage. These artists have had instances where their challenge of cultural ideas had resulted in threats and harassment, but they continued to make art despite these obstacles.

Following the Fall of Kabul (2021), many of these art pieces have been painted over and many artists and activist began to flee the country as refuges who still continue to make art pieces to raise social awareness.

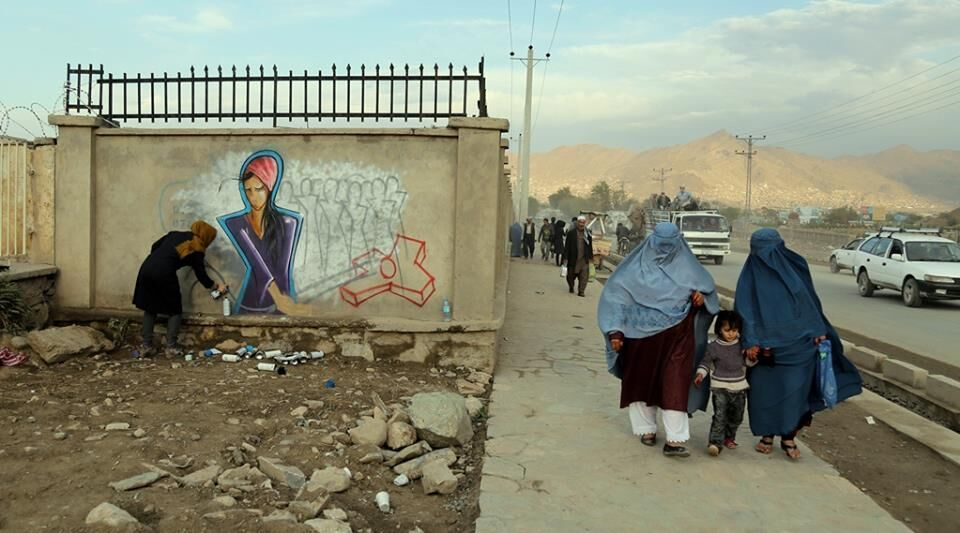
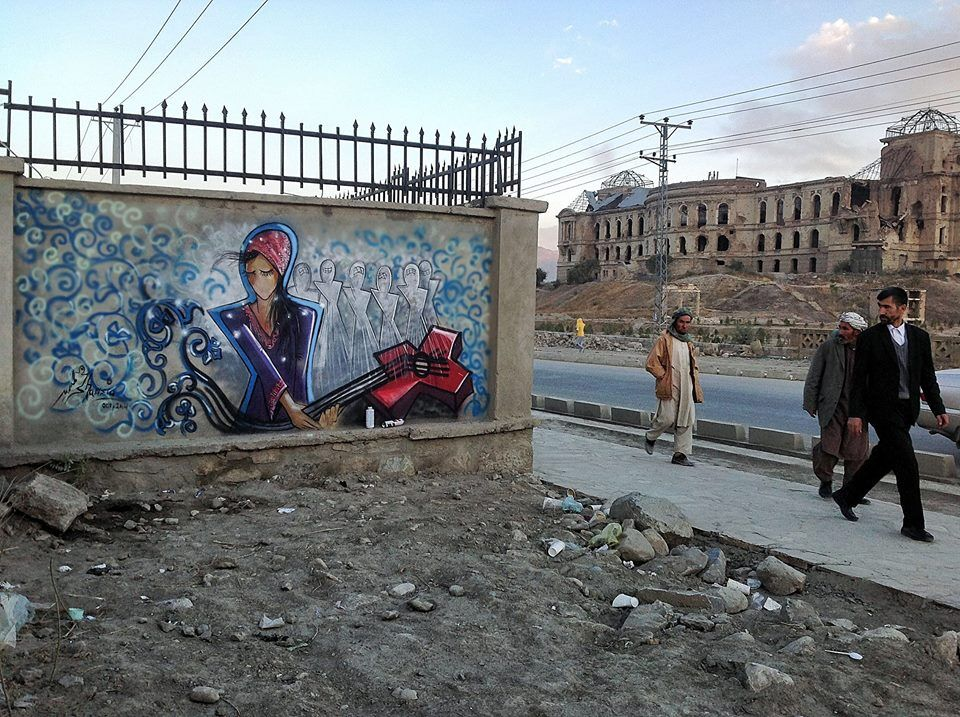
Graffiti at Darul Aman Palace, Kabul by Shamsia Hassani

== See also ==
- List of Afghan artists
