= List of Afghan women artists =

This is a list of women artists who were born in Afghanistan, of Afghani descent, or whose artworks are closely associated with that country.

== A ==
- Lida Abdul (born 1973), Afghan-born American video artist and performance artist
- Rada Akbar (born 1988), Afghan-born visual artist and photographer, living in exile

== G ==
- Mariam Ghani (born 1978), American visual artist, photographer, filmmaker and social activist of Afghan descent

== H ==
- Shamsia Hassani (born 1988), graffiti artist and professor

== K ==
- Samira Kitman (born 1984), calligrapher and miniaturist, resides in England

== S ==
- Malina Suliman (born 1990), graffiti artist, metalworker, and painter

== T ==
- Safia Tarzi, fashion designer

== W ==
- Farzana Wahidy (born 1984), photographer

== See also ==
- List of Afghans
- List of Afghan artists
