= Khair Mohammad Khan Yari =

Afghan painter

- خیر محمد خان یاری
- Born: 1901
- Died: 1976 (aged 74–75)
- Known for: painting, drawing
- Style: realism

Khair Mohammad Khan Yari (1901–1976), was a prominent Afghan painter.

== Life ==
Khair Mohammad Yari, the son of Yar Mohammad Khan (an official of Amir Habibullah Khan's government), was born and raised in Kabul. He was one of the first graduates of Kabul School of Fine Arts who graduated with the first grade in his class together with his friend Ghousuddin Khan. Khan Yari worked as an art teacher in the School of Fine Arts for many years. Then, at the request of the then governor of Herat, he traveled to that province to establish the Herat School of Arts. He was also interested in poetry, sculpture, theater, writing, dramaturgy, engineering, and costume design. He is considered one of the greatest painters of Afghanistan in twentieth century, along with Mohammad Maimangi and Abdul Ghafoor Breshna. Nasrollah Sarvari is one of his students.
