= Mohiuddin Shabnam =

Afghan painter

Ghulam Mohieddin Shabnam
- غلام محی‌الدین شبنم
- Born: 1935
- Died: 2009 (aged 73–74)
- Occupations: Artist, teacher
- Known for: Painting, drawing
- Style: abstract/cubism

Ghulam Mohiuddin Shabnam (Dari غلام محي الدین شبنم ; 1935–2009), was a prominent Afghan painter, song composer, and educator. He was one of the most famous figures of cubism and abstract art in Afghanistan.

== Life ==
He is considered one of the painters of the second golden age of cubism in Afghanistan, along with Karim Shah Khan, Abdul Ghafoor Breshna, Hafiz Pakzad, Mohammad Maimanagi and Akbar Khorasani.

Shabnam was a collaborator and artistic consultant of the United Nations Education, Culture and Awareness Department (UNESCO). In the 1960s, he became famous for composing songs in Persian, Pashto and Balochi languages, which were played on the radio.
