= ArtLords =

ArtLords is an artist collective based in Afghanistan. Between 2014 and 2022, ArtLords completed roughly 2,200 murals in multiple Afghan provinces. Murals covered a range of topics, including national and international social issues like corruption, human rights, and public health.

In addition to murals, ArtLords also ran a cafe in Kabul, published an arts and culture magazine, and had both in-person and online galleries.

== History ==
ArtLords was founded in 2014 by Omaid Sharifi and Kabir Mokamel. The collective's name was chosen to reference and contrast with drug lords and warlords, both of whom have had a negative impact on Afghanistan. Their first mural was "I See You," which gave rise to a larger mural project of the same name in which the group painted large sets of eyes to symbolize the visibility of corruption in the Afghan government. In 2016, the project won ArtLords a Sheikh Tamim Bin Hamad Al Thani Anti-Corruption Excellence Award for their mural project. As of 2019, the project comprised 70 murals.

In 2018, one of the group's murals, of activist Hamida Barmaki, was removed by a militant group. Between 2014 and 2022, ArtLords' artists faced threats of death and kidnapping from the Taliban and their supporters. Three artists were killed by IEDs.

As of 2020, the organization had 18 employees and worked with 54 Afghan artists. In 2021, the government of Afghanistan commissioned ArtLords to create a painting titled "The Unseen Afghanistan", which was then given to the United Nations Secretary-General.

As the Taliban began their takeover of Afghanistan, many ArtLords murals were defaced or destroyed, either by the Taliban or by the artists themselves in an effort to prevent Taliban officials from coming after the artists. ArtLords was painting a mural in Kabul when the Taliban entered the city.

Following the Fall of Kabul in 2021, a number of ArtLords artists attempted to flee the country. The organization has since established offices in Virginia, the United States, and Istanbul, Turkey. Co-founder Sharifi received a fellowship in Harvard University’s Scholars at Risk Program. Five artists were relocated to the American state of Vermont, where they recreated temporary versions of some of their murals.

== Murals ==
Between 2014 and 2022, ArtLords completed roughly 2,200 murals in multiple Afghan provinces. Most of these murals were painted on blast walls which had been erected beginning in the early 2000s. In addition to the walls being good canvases, the collective also suggests that introducing art to the walls creates "a positive, uplifting visual experience" for local residents.

Murals covered a range of topics, including celebrating Afghan workers and raising awareness of national and international social issues like corruption, human rights (including education, the murder of George Floyd, and the killing of Japanese physician Tetsu Nakamura), and public health (including advocating for polio vaccination). The organization described themselves as being welcomed wherever they went to paint murals, which they attributed in part to their collaborative nature; artists utilized a "paint-by-numbers" design and would encourage local residents to join them in painting the mural.

== Recognition ==
In December 2015, the group had an exhibition in Berlin.

In 2019, the Index on Censorship nominated ArtLords for their 2019 Freedom of Expression Award.
