= Massoud Hossaini =

Photojournalist for Agence France-Presse

Massoud Hossaini (born 10 December 1981) is an Afghan-born photojournalist. He works for Agence France-Presse. Hossaini was the winner of the 2012 Pulitzer Prize for Breaking News Photography and the winner of World Press Photo Contest, along with several other world photography awards, he won William Randolph Hearst Award for Excellence in Professional Journalism (2021), from San Jose State University's School of Journalism.

== Biography ==
Hossaini was born in Kabul during the Soviet–Afghan War, but his family fled to Iran when he was six months old after his father was arrested for opposing the communist government. After graduating high school in 1996, Hossaini became a political activist with the Iranian reform movement and began recording events with his camera, including Afghanistan refugees' life in Mashhad.

He was stuck in the American University of Afghanistan attack and wrote an SOS message on Twitter on 24 August 2016.

After the 11 September attacks, he returned to Afghanistan to join Aina, a French cultural organization and studied with photographer Manoocher Deghati. He joined AFP in 2007. His work is featured in the American documentary Frame by Frame.
