= Karim Shah Khan =

Afghan painter

- کریم شاه خان
- Born: 1919
- Died: 1980s
- Known for: painting, drawing
- Style: realism

Karim Shah Khan (1919 - late 1980s) was an Afghan painter.

== Life ==
He was born in Kabul and was a graduate of the A'dadieh School. Among his works are Sketches of domestic and wild animals published by the Ministry of Education. He died in Kabul in the late 1980s. He is considered one of the painters of the second golden age of Realism in Afghanistan, along with Mohammad Maimangi, Abdul Ghafoor Breshna, Ghulam Mohieddin Shabnam, Hafiz Pakzad and Akbar Khorasani. Nasrollah Sarvari is one of his students.
