= Frame by Frame (film) =

- Film poster
- Directed by: Alexandria Bombach; Mo Scarpelli
- Produced by: Alexandria Bombach; Mo Scarpelli; Jeff Orlowski
- Cinematography: Alexandria Bombach; Mo Scarpelli
- Edited by: Alexandria Bombach
- Music by: Patrick Jonsson
- Release date: March 14, 2015 (SXSW)
- Running time: 85 minutes
- Country: United States
- Languages: Dari; English

Frame by Frame is a 2015 documentary film that follows four Afghan photojournalists – Farzana Wahidy, Massoud Hossaini, Wakil Kohsar and Najibullah Musafar – who face struggles as they report during the “photo revolution” that is occurring in the post-Taliban free press. It is directed by Mo Scarpelli and Alexandria Bombach. It had its world premiere at the South by Southwest 2015 Festival in Austin, Texas, and was nominated for a 2015 Cinema Eye Honors Award in the category “Spotlight Award.”

== Background ==
In late 2012, Scarpelli and Bombach traveled to Afghanistan to film a documentary short about photographers. This turned into the feature-length film Frame by Frame, a personal look at the lives of four Afghan photographers working where photography was formerly banned by the Taliban government. Scarpelli and Bombach raised more than $70,000 using Kickstarter to bring Frame by Frame to life.

== Production ==
The film was shot in a cinema vérité style, which presented a unique challenge to the filmmakers because they did not speak the native language; oftentimes, they wouldn't know exactly what they had filmed until they got to the editing room and worked with a translator. Both filmmakers have said that being foreign women and having an all-female crew gave them unique access and allowed them into places that foreign men would have had a much harder time entering. Because of Scarpelli's background in journalism, she characterizes the film as long-form journalism. “The point of it is to inform and spark dialogue about local journalism under fire.”

Scarpelli has said she was influenced by character-driven films with strong narratives, including films like Cutie and the Boxer (2013), Virunga (2014), Stories We Tell (2012), and After Tiller (2013).

== Reception ==
Frame by Frame was shown at over 50 film festivals including Hot Docs Film Festival, Seattle International Film Festival and BFI London Film Festival. Scarpelli and Bombach received enthusiastic praise from film critics. The Hollywood Reporter called Frame by Frame “a work of profound immediacy, in sync with the photographers’ commitment and hope" and BBC Culture proclaimed “the film features photographers passionate about telling stories of the true identity of Afghanistan – whether they are newsworthy or not.”
