= Faridollah Adib Ahein =

Afghanistan artist (born 1965)

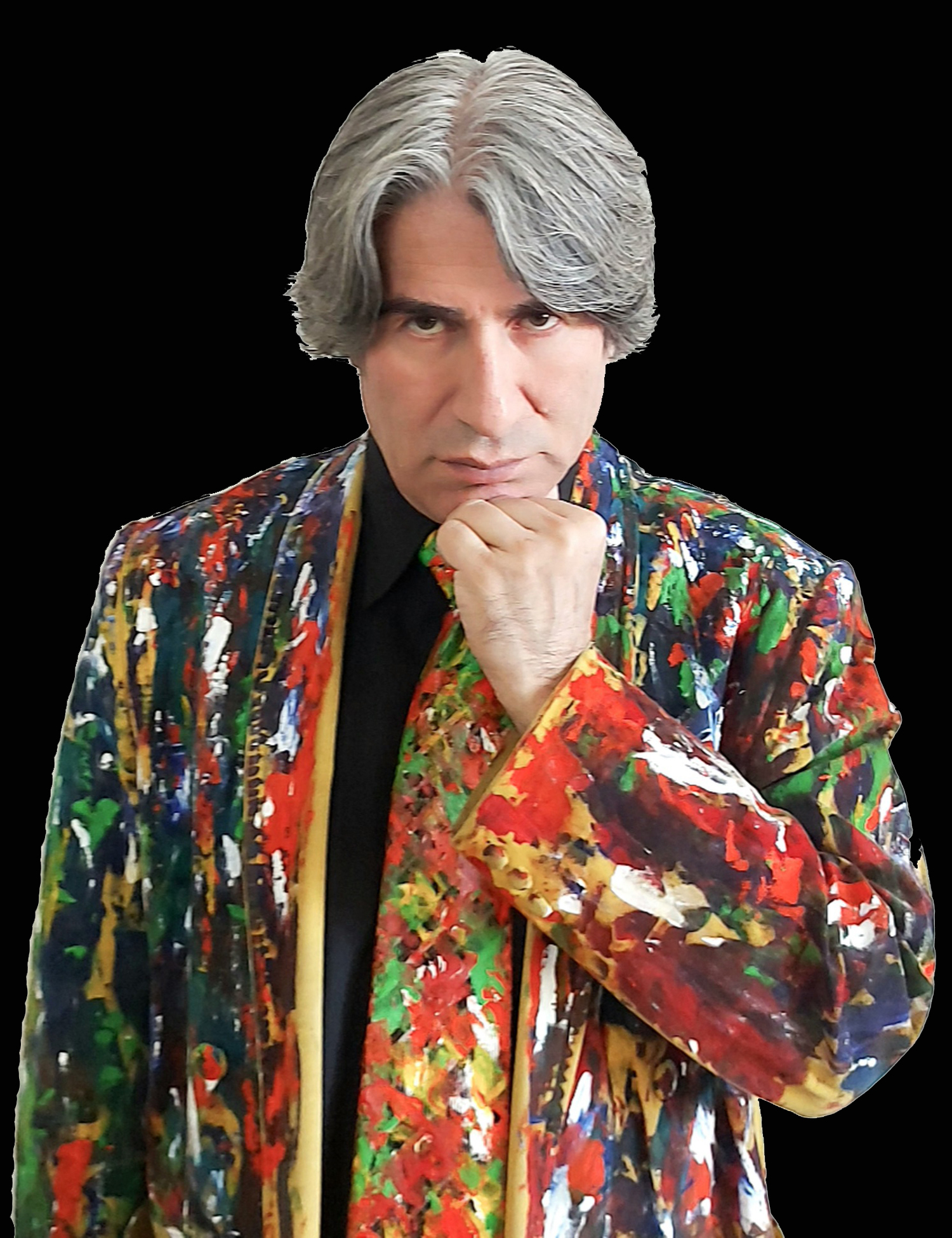
- Ahein in 2024
- Born: November 7, 1965 (age 60); Herat, Afghanistan
- Known for: Painting collector
- Style: Action painting
- Movement: Abstract expressionism Conceptual Art modern art

Faridollah Adib Ahein (born Faridullah Adeeb Ayan; November 7, 1965) is an Afghanistan visual artist, critic, and painter. He is known for his contributions to the field of painting, work on the canvas, and abstract expressionism.

== Early life ==
Ahein was born and educated in Herat. His father, Azizuollah, was a rank-and-file officer, and his mother, a teacher. During the Afghanistan Civil War, Ahein and his family immigrated to Iran, where he studied painting under his uncle, Nasrollah Sarvari.

== Style ==
Ahein's works are usually called "conceptual abstraction", often explores philosophy. He uses spatula and trowel and often canvases by dripping and sprinkling paint.

He can be considered an influential figure in the realm of contemporary art among Afghan painters, due to his simultaneous contributions to the abstract expressionism movement, he has gone beyond the conventional boundaries of the art world beyond the innovative techniques of his drip paintings.

In his works, he challenges the way of understanding the world and invites by discovering the mysterious and unexpected aspects of human experience. Adib Ahein has collected (paintings) of Afghanistan cultural and historical works of art. He is also the first known and registered collector of Afghan art works in Iran.
