= Lida Abdul =

Afghan video and performance artist

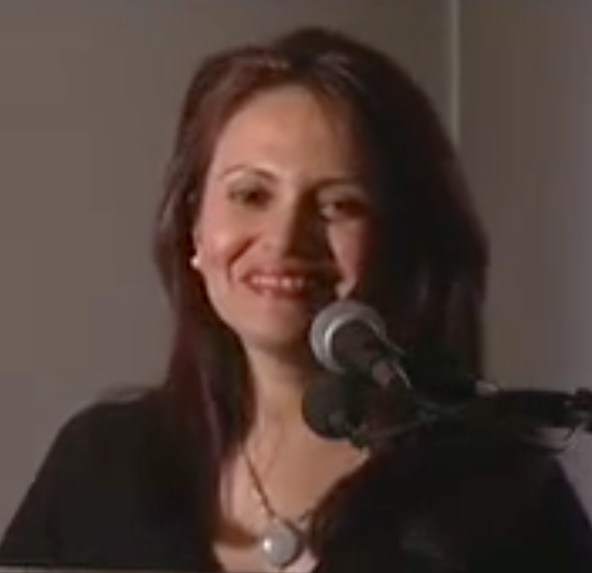
- At the Brooklyn Museum in 2007
- Born: Lida Abdullah; 1973 (age 52–53); Kabul, Afghanistan
- Education: California State University, Fullerton, University of California, Berkeley
- Occupation: Artist
- Known for: Video art, performance art
- Awards: Prince Claus Awards, UNESCO Prize for the Promotion of the Arts, Taiwan Award at the Venice Biennale

Lidā Abdul (Dari: لیدا عبدل; née Lidā Abdullah, Dari: لیدا عبدالله; born 1973), is an American-Afghan-born video artist and performance artist. She was born as Lida Abdullah in Kabul in 1979 and fled the country as a child during the Soviet Invasion. She went on to live in India, Germany, and the United States.

Her work has been featured at the 2005 Venice Biennale, Kunsthalle Vienna, Museum of Modern Art Arnhem Netherlands and Miami Cantral, CAC Centre d'art contemporain de Brétigny and Frac Lorraine Metz, France. Her work has also been exhibited in festivals in Mexico, Spain, Germany, Uzbekistan, Kyrgyzstan, and Afghanistan.

She lives and works in Los Angeles and Kabul.

== Early life ==
Abdul fled Afghanistan in December 1979 with the threat of the Soviet invasion, making her a refugee to India, Germany and the United States, and thus is an "artistic nomad". The Russian-Afghan conflict goes back to 1838. Autocratic Russia (and later the USSR) had expansionist goals, continually competing with Great Britain for Central Asian territory. Historically, Afghanistan's goals have been independence, maintenance of territory and the security of the throne. This contrasted with two great powers, Russia and Great Britain, competing for power in the Middle East. The Soviet Union and Afghanistan were "natural allies" during the Second World War. The Soviet Invasion of Afghanistan is considered the leading event of the Cold War. Soviet presence in Afghanistan was felt strongly in infrastructure. Afghan cities, notoriously difficult to travel between, were connected with a major road system with Soviet aid.

Abdul completed a Bachelor of Arts in political science in 1997 and a Bachelor of Arts in philosophy in 1998, both from California State University, Fullerton. She also completed a Master of Fine Arts in the University of California, Berkeley in 2000.

== Career and art ==
Abdul's video and performance art has been described as abstract and dream-like, and she uses film techniques such as blurring to evoke the mind, as well as an "epic scale". Her films are politically charged and use themes of hope and renewal to suggest her war-torn home country's future of progress. While Abdul was made a refugee in 1979 after the Soviet invasion, she was able to return to Afghanistan after the fall of the Taliban to revisit her home country, film, and meet with Afghan people to talk about their hopes for the future. She considers herself a nomadic artist, because of her life growing up involved a lot of moving country-to-country and keeping her away from her homeland. Abdul uses those feelings and emotions as inspiration or motivation in her art. Abdul creates political commentary, films that speak to themes of devastation, displacement culture, identity and bodies.

=== "White House" (2005) ===
White House is a short film rich with political content. It is one of Abdul's better-known works, which was shown at the Venice Biennale. The film depicts the rubble of a classical building in a landscape set outside of Kabul. The artist films herself dressed in black, painting the rubble white. A man enters the scene, and Abdul paints his back in a similar fashion. Finally, the short, five-minute film ends with a herd of goats exploring the ruins. The film is rhythmic, and a symbol of hope and progress, as well as an act of political resistance to various injustices, such as the United States' profitable occupation of Afghanistan, the whitewashing of history, and Afghan people's psychological injury from living in a war-torn region.

=== "Dome" (2005) ===
Dome holds an optimistic tone contrasted with symbols of distress. It depicts a boy spinning joyfully in a crumbling mosque while an American helicopter passes overhead. The spinning and dizziness are meant to represent displacement due to war, the irrationality of war acts and the strength of human hope~~›~~

=== "Trees" (2005) ===
Trees is a video documentary where young men discuss their reason for cutting down a tree, one that is still alive and bearing fruits. They explain their reasoning for cutting it down is because it was the site of many hangings and had to be destroyed. In the end the men cut the tree down and carried it off.

=== "Clapping With Stones" (2005) ===
Clapping with stones is a video documentary, which contains a group of men in black Shalwar Kameez performing a prayer like ritual in front of the rock of Bamiyan. The Bamiyan contains traces of ancient Buddha's, which was destroyed in 2001 by the Taliban.

=== "Brick Sellers of Kabul" (2006) ===
Brick Sellers of Kabul is a photograph of young children in Kabul, each of them breaking a brick that they hand to a man with a shock of unruly hair and a painted expression. They are very serious and there is a sense of adulthood in the lives of each of these children. Abdul said, "Kabul is full of kids who run in the streets, but if you knew their lives you would wonder how it is possible for them to keep going... when their laughter disappears".

== Exhibitions and shows ==
Lida Abdul's work has appeared in numerous solo and group exhibitions in the Middle East, Europe and North America.

=== Solo exhibitions ===
- National Museum of Afghanistan (Kabul, Afghanistan 2007)
- Indianapolis Museum of Contemporary Art (Indianapolis, USA 2008)
- OK Center for Contemporary Art (Linz, Austria 2008)
- Krannert Art Museum (Champaign, Illinois, US 2010)
- Centro de Arte Contemporáneo (Málaga, Spain 2013)
- Calouste Gulbenkian Foundation (Lisbon, Portugal, 2013)
- Foreman Art Gallery, Bishops University (Quebec, Canada, 2013)
- Giogrio Persano Gallery (Turin, Italy, 2013)
- Calouste Gulbenkian Foundation (Paris, France, 2014)
- CAP Center (Lyon, France, 2015)

=== Group exhibitions ===
- Venice Biennale (2005 and 2015)
- Moscow Biennale (2007)
- Global Feminisms (Brooklyn Museum, NYC, USA 2007)
- History of Violence (Haifa Museum of Art, Israel 2009)
- Beyond Memory (Museum on the Seam, Jerusalem, Israel 2011)
- Documenta (13) (Kassel, Germany 2012)
- Transition Project (Yapi Kredi Kültür Merkezi, Istanbul, Turkey 2013)

== Awards ==
Lida Abdul's work has received several awards, including the Taiwan Award at the Venice Biennale in 2005, the Prince Claus Award in Amsterdam and the Netherlands in 2006, the UNESCO Prize for the Promotion of the Arts from the United Arab Emirates in 2007, and the EMAF Award in Osnabrueck, Germany in 2009, and won the Finalist Mario Prize 1, Fondazione Merz, Turin in 2015.

== Themes ==
Abdul's art also addresses the common issue of the depiction of Afghan people in the mass western media. It is common in western media to only report on Afghanistan in contexts of terror and war, and public western knowledge does not expand much beyond that image. Through her art, Abdul hopes Western people will learn more about Afghan people and cultures.

=== Ethnicity and language ===
Her works are permeated with; cultural identity, migration, psychological damage, process of destruction & displacement, and include notions of exile and homeland. Though a centrally governed country, is not unified in culture, national identity or language, though the lingua franca is Dari. Few people living in Afghanistan would describe themselves as "Afghan", but rather of a specific tribe living in the region and surrounding areas. Major groups include Pushtuns, Tajiks, Uzbeks and Baluch, each distinct and without strong feelings of national borders or identity, who spill into neighboring countries without regard for borders.

=== Terror and media representation ===
Some attributes unite most "Afghans", however, with a 90% majority Sunni Muslim population. One of Abdul's goals in her films is to educate a western audience about the nature of these cultures, and how they may diverge from the assumptions that people make about Afghanistan and Afghan people due to stereotypes they may encounter in the popular media. She recognizes the tendency of western media to paint a stereotypical image of Afghanistan, and through her art, she hopes to humanize people who are often demonized. One such stereotype is an image of a nation overtaken by war and stripped entirely of culture, however, even in light of devastation, Afghan people still had the desire to create art. With the works of Lida Abdul and other artists in the forefront, a western audience is given an alternative way to see Afghanistan removed from the depictions of terror and devastated cities.

=== Politics ===
Afghanistan is more regional than central in orientation and culture, in part because of the lack of transportation throughout the country to connect major points of interest. However, a road system connecting the three major cities was built with Soviet aid.

== See also ==
- List of Afghan women artists
