= Jalaluddin Jalal =

Afghan writer, poet and painter

Jalaluddin Jalal (Persian: جلال الدین جلال; 1923–1977), was an Afghan writer, poet and painter.

== Life ==
Jalaluddin Jalal was born on 15 October 1923 in Kabul. He was the son of the treasurer Masdjidi Khan and grew up in an intellectual Afghan family. He was interested in music, art and literature since being a youth. He was a scholar of Ghulam Mohammad Maimanagi (born 1873; died 1935), who was a well-known painter, professor of visual arts and founder of the first art school in Afghanistan. After completing his studies he set up a construction company. 1955 he married and became father of five children. His children live in Europe and the USA. His eldest son Saifuddin Jalal lives as a philosopher, writer and poet in Hamburg, Germany. His daughter Tubah Jalal is also a poet.

His poems are written in the new Persian Dari language in the Indian style. His raw model was the Dari poet Mirza Abdul Qadir Bedil Dehlawi (born 1645 in Patna), who is recognised as a master of the Indian style.

He died in 1977 in Kabul.

== Works ==
- Tnzkakh Arm طنزکاکه بازو
- تحفۀ شرمندگی (Shame)
- Asrar e Adab (Basics of Literature)
- Gulbone Adab (Gardener of Literature)
- Armaghane Adab (Gifts of Literature)
- Afghanische Gedichte (Afghan poems), published 1994 in Hamburg
- Song text for the Afghan film Dar Sar Zamine Begana (In a Foreign Country), sung by Farhad Darya
- Tikadar (The Builder), published 2014 in Kabul
