= Aatifi =

Afghan-German artist

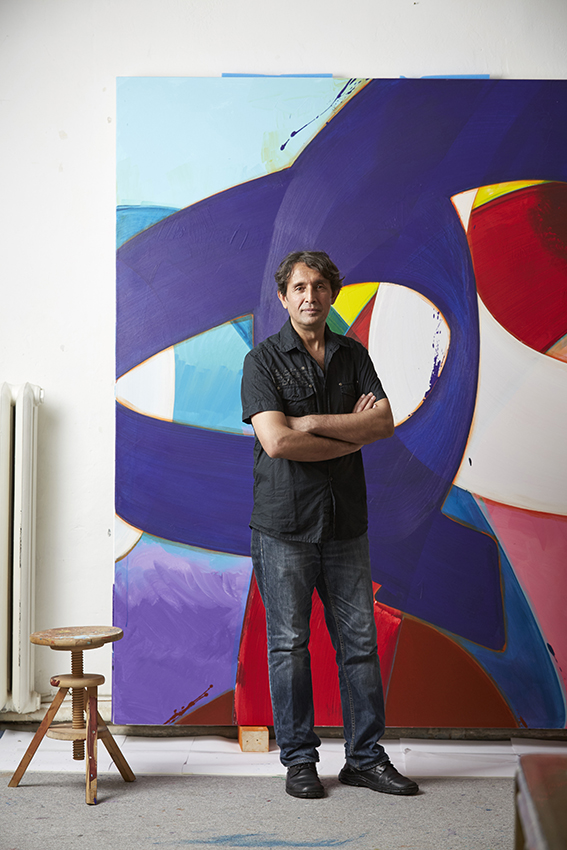
Aatifi

Aatifi (born 1965) is a contemporary Afghan-German painter, printmaker and calligrapher. He was born in Kandahar, Afghanistan. He lives and works in Bielefeld, Germany. His works contain abstracted Arabian calligraphy and modern European influences.

== Biography ==
After graduating as a master calligrapher early, he moved to Kabul in 1982. There he finished High School, opened a workshop shortly after and built a school for drawing and calligraphy. He then entered the Kabul University's Fine Arts Faculty in 1989 to become a painter. In the same year, he was awarded the Prize for Calligraphy and Composition by the Afghan Ministry of Culture and was awarded a second time the year after. In 1991, he was awarded first place by the artists group Hakim Naser Khesraw Balkhi. In 1992, he finished his studies in Kabul. Moving to Germany in 1995, Aatifi became a member of the Sächsischer Künstlerbund and worked as a stipendiary at Moritzburg Castle in 1997. He then got recognized by painter and professor Siegfried Klotz who offered him classes in 1997/98 at Dresden Academy of Fine Arts. In the late 1990s Aatifi moved to Bielefeld where he set up his studio to work and to create art to the present day.

=== Solo Exhibition at Museum für Islamische Kunst in the Pergamon Museum Berlin (2015) ===
Invited by director Stefan Weber Aatifi curated an exhibition in the Museum für Islamische Kunst in the Pergamon Museum Berlin in 2015 titled 'Aatifi - News from Afghanistan'. Specialised in preserving and presenting ancient Islamic art, Weber's decision to implement contemporary paintings on a large scale in the museum for the first time was based on Aatifi's approach towards calligraphy. 'Aatifi comes from a living tradition, which also distinguishes him from a number of contemporary artists [ ... ]. The strengths of the tradition - i.e. the foundations of classical aesthetics in calligraphy - are not always known, nor is the freedom of distancing oneself from these understood. That's why poor imitations of cultural archetypes are produced. Not so with Aatifi. Aatifi pulls off the balancing act [ ... ].'

== Work and techniques ==
Aatifis works can be described as a form of highly stylized appropriation of written language. Coming from the tradition of classic Arabian calligraphy however, he tried to reduce the evidence of perceivable language even further to the point of him using the bare shapes of his source material for the intricacy of the composition. Using acrylics, chalk, ink, charcoal, and metal to establish a wide range of intercepted and connected spaces. In his figurative and abstract works Aatifi also turns to printmaking in various techniques, which he first got in contact with when living in Dresden. His colour palette is a representation of his experiences in Afghanistan and Germany, but is also based on his travels around the world. In 2016, Aatifi has included works in collage technique to his oeuvre.

== Works in museums and private collections ==
- Museum für Islamische Kunst in the Pergamon Museum Berlin/Berlin State Museums/Prussian Cultural Heritage Foundation
- Kupferstich-Kabinett/State Art Collections Dresden
- Municipal Art Collection Radebeul
- Federal Centre of Culture Salzau
- The Collection of the Kunstverein Zwickau e. V.
- Municipal Art Collection Zwickau

== Exhibitions ==
- 2020: 'Written Imagery', Aatifi, Dagmar Buhr, Herta Müller, Babak Saed, Elizabeth Thallauer, Neue Galerie Dachau, Dachau, Group Show
- 2020: paper positions Berlin / Positions, Galerie VON & VON (Nürnberg), Berlin, Group Show
- 2019: 'Aatifi – Alphabet der Malerei', Herforder Kunstverein, Herford, Solo Show
- 2018: 'Hier und Jetzt – Aktuelle Kunst in Westfalen', Gustav-Lübcke-Museum, Hamm, Group Show
- 2018: paper positions Basel, Galerie VON & VON (Nürnberg), Basel, Schweiz, Group Show
- 2017: POSITIONS Berlin Art Fair, Galerie VON & VON (Nürnberg), Berlin, Group Show
- 2017: 'Aatifi – Neographie', TKA Art Advisors, Hamburg, Solo Show
- 2017: 'Aatifi – Abstrakte Neographie', Internationaler Club im Auswärtigen Amt e. V., Berlin
- 2017: SimonBart Gallery, Sardinien, Italy, Group Show
- 2017: 'Aatifi', Galerie VON & VON, Nürnberg, Solo Show
- 2017: DIE GROSSE NRW, Museum Kunstpalast, Düsseldorf, Group Show
- 2015: 'Aatifi – News from Afghanistan', Museum für Islamische Kunst in the Pergamon Museum Berlin, Solo Show
- 2015: 'Aatifi – Prozess III', Museum Ratingen, Ratingen, Solo Show
- 2012: 'Ereignis Druckgraphik 4: Ansichten – Aussichten', Galerie Vor Ort Ost, Leipzig, Group Show
- 2011: 'METAKOM', Kunstverein Kreis Gütersloh, Gütersloh, Group Show
- 2009: 'Aatifi – Skripturale Fragmente', Galerie im Torhaus, Federal Centre of Culture Salzau, Salzau, Solo Show
- 2006: 'Contemporary Art Kabul', art Karlsruhe, Karlsruhe, Group Show
- 2005: 'Aatifi – Tanz am frühen Morgen', City Gallery Radebeul, Radebeul, Solo Show
- 1990: 'Aatifi', Ministry of Culture, Kabul, Afghanistan, Solo Show
- 1989: 'Aatifi', Kabul University, Kabul, Afghanistan, Solo Show

== Awards and stipends ==
- 2018: Rekognition price of Stadt Hamm, Hier und Jetzt – Aktuelle Kunst in Westfalen', Gustav-Lübcke-Museum, Hamm
- 2017: Stipend at Aldegrever Gesellschaft, Münster
- 2012: 5th Collotype Printing Symposium Leipzig, Leipzig
- 2012: International Graphic Arts Symposium Zwickau, Zebra 5, Kunstverein Zwickau
- 2009: Stipend at the Federal Centre of Culture Schleswig-Holstein, Salzau
- 2008: Stipend at the 18th Saxony Graphic Arts Symposium, Leipzig
- 2001: Stipend at Künstlerhaus Schwalenberg, Schwalenberg
- 1997: Stipend at Schloss Moritzburg, Moritzburg
- 1991: 1st Prize by the Afghan Artist Group Hakim Naser Khesraw Balkhi
- 1990: 1st Prize by the Afghan Ministry of Culture
- 1989: 1st Prize by the Afghan Ministry of Culture

== Bibliography ==
- Kunibert Bering, Rolf Niehoff: Horizont 1, Bilder der Gegenwart – Globalisierung und Migration. In: Horizonte der Bild-Kunst-Geschichte, Part 1, 1st edition, Athena-Verlag, Oberhausen 2018.
- Julia Thieke: Zwischen Lapislazuli und Lithium. Künstlerportrait Aatifi. In: Kunst & Material [magazine], 2016.
- Martina Bauer (Ed.): Aatifi – News from Afghanistan [exhibition catalogue], Kerber Verlag, 2015.
- Kunstverein Zwickau e.V. (Ed.): Internationales Grafiksymposium Zwickau Zebra 5. [exhibition catalogue] 2013.
- The Graphic Arts Museum of Schreiner Foundation (Ed.): Von Kaiserblau bis Luxusschwarz. [exhibition catalogue] Verlag Grafik Museum Stiftung Schreiner, 2011.
- Friederike Schir, Reiner Kuhn, Manuel Schroeder, Inga Schubert-Hartmann (Eds.): Metakom. [exhibition catalogue], Kettler, 2011.

== See also ==
- List of Afghan artists
