= Saifuddin Jalal =

Afghan philosopher, writer, and poet

Saifuddin Jalal (Persian: سیف الدین جلال; born 22 March 1958 in Kabul), pseudonym Mayparast Jalal, nickname Saiffi Jalal, is an Afghan philosopher, writer and poet.

== Life ==
Jalal is the oldest son of the painter and poet Jalaluddin Jalal (born 15 October 1923 in Kabul; died 1977 also there) and a grandson of the treasurer Masdjidi Khan. He grew up with four siblings in an Afghan intellectual family. He and his siblings live in Europe and U.S.A. His sister Tubah Jalal is also a poet.

After finishing school, he became a civil servant in the Afghan Ministry of Mines and Industry. He lives since 1980 in Hamburg, Germany. In the year 2012 he published a book in Kabul with the title God isn't a democrat.
