= Akbar Khurasani =

Afghan-Ukrainian painter

Akbar Khorasani
- اکبر خراسانی
- Born: 1961 (age 64–65)
- Known for: painting, drawing
- Style: realism

Akbar Khorasani (born 1961) is a prominent Afghan-Ukrainian painter.

== Life ==
Khorasani was born in Uruzgan in Afghanistan and was drafted into the army in Kabul before going to art school in Ukraine in 1986. During his studies, the Taliban took control of Afghanistan, rendering him unable to return; in 1996 he was recognized as a refugee. He became a Ukrainian citizen in 2003.

His work is held in private collections in Asia, Europe, and the United States. He is considered one of the painters of the second golden age of Realism in Afghanistan, along with Karim Shah Khan, Abdul Ghafoor Breshna, Ghulam Mohieddin Shabnam, Mohammad Maimanagi and Hafiz Pakzad.
