= Hafiz Pakzad =

Afghan painter

- حفیظ پاکزاد
- Born: 1955 (age 70–71)
- Known for: painting, drawing
- Style: realism

Hafiz Pakzad (born 1955) is a prominent Afghan painter.

== Life ==
He is considered one of the painters of the second golden age of Realism in Afghanistan, along with Karim Shah Khan, Abdul Ghafoor Breshna, Ghulam Mohieddin Shabnam, Mohammad Maimanagi and Akbar Khorasani.
