= Farzana Wahidy =

Photographer from Afghanistan

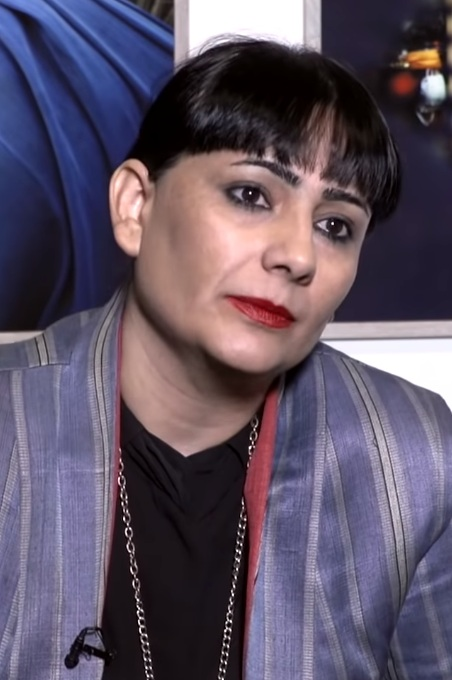
- Farzana Wahidy talks to BBC Persian, April 2020
- Born: 1984 (age 40–41); Kandahar, Democratic Republic of Afghanistan
- Occupation(s): documentary photographer, photojournalist
- Years active: 2003

Farzana Wahidy (born 1984) is an Afghan documentary photographer and photojournalist. She has made photographs of women and girls in Afghanistan. She was the first female photographer in Afghanistan to work with international media agencies such as the Associated Press (AP) and Agence France-Presse (AFP).

Wahidy studied at the AINA Photojournalism Institute set up in Kabul by Reza Deghati to train Afghan women and men to pursue careers in photojournalism. Beginning in 2002, she was one of 15 students selected from more than 500 applicants. She studied under the Iranian-French photojournalist Manoocher Deghati. Wahidy chose a career in photojournalism because she wanted to capture the stories that she witnessed throughout her life. Wahidy uses her photography to express her own emotions as an Afghan woman and amplify the voices of others like her in the male-dominated country of Afghanistan. With her photography, she wants to portray the ordinary lives of Afghan women, not just the issues that they face.

== Life and career ==
Born in Kandahar in 1984, Wahidy moved with her family to Kabul at the age of six. She was a teenager when the Taliban took over Afghanistan in 1996. At age 13 she was beaten in the street for not wearing a burqa. Looking back at that moment, she stated that she wished she was a photographer at the time, able to show today's society what it was like for young girls like herself, but photography and other forms of creative expression were banned. Her father, who had a collection of cameras, had to give up his passion for capturing moments of his family's life on camera. Even their family photo albums were destroyed during the civil war.

During the Taliban era women were forbidden from continuing their education. Hiding books under her burka so she wouldn't get caught, she attended an underground school with about 300 other students in a residential area of Kabul, and when U.S.-led forces ended Taliban rule in 2001, she began high school. In 2004, Wahidy was hired as a photographer for Agence-France Press, an international news agency located in Paris, France but later joined the Associated Press in New York City.

In 2007 she received a scholarship to take the two-year photojournalism program at Loyalist College in Belleville, Ontario, returning to Afghanistan in 2010.

Wahidy uses her access as a woman to focus on Afghan women and their roles in their segregated society, including prostitutes and women imprisoned for "moral crimes".

Wahidy founded the Afghanistan Photographers Association. The APA is a non-profit and non-political organization that supports photographers throughout Afghanistan and Afghan photographers traveling abroad. Wahidy established the APA because she wanted to enact change within Afghanistan through photography. She had the goal of closing the knowledge gap pertaining to art and photography in her home country and encouraging understanding. The APA allows Afghan photographers to gain connections and further their careers.

In 2009 she was an Open Society Institute grantee for her documentary project on Afghan women. Wahidy is the recipient of the National Geographic All Roads Photography Program Merit Award and was nominated for World Press Photo Joop Swart Masterclass.

2016 she was recognized for her outstanding accomplishments after graduating and was gifted the Premier's Award for Creative Arts and Design.

Her work is featured in the American documentary Frame by Frame.

Wahidy's photographs have been showcased internationally in Afghanistan, Canada, United States, India, Pakistan, Germany, Italy, Norway, Geneva, China, and Finland.
