= Zakia Wardak =

Consul General of Afghanistan in Mumbai

President of the Society of Afghan Women in Engineering and Construction.

Zakia Wardak is an Afghan architect, politician, and businesswoman. She served as the first female Consul General of Afghanistan in Mumbai. Wardak is an advocate for inclusion and women's rights. She is from Kabul. Wardak has served as president of the Society of Afghan Women in Engineering and Construction. In 2018, she ran for a seat in the 2018 Afghan parliamentary election.

In May 2024, Wardak, resigned as Afghanistan's top diplomat in India days after she was reportedly caught by airport authorities smuggling nearly $2 million worth of gold into the country. Wardak was reportedly stopped in April by the authorities at Mumbai airport on her arrival from Dubai, carrying about 55 pounds of gold. She was reportedly not arrested because of her diplomatic immunity, but the gold was confiscated.
