= Nasrollah Sarvari =

Afghan painter

- نصرالله سروری
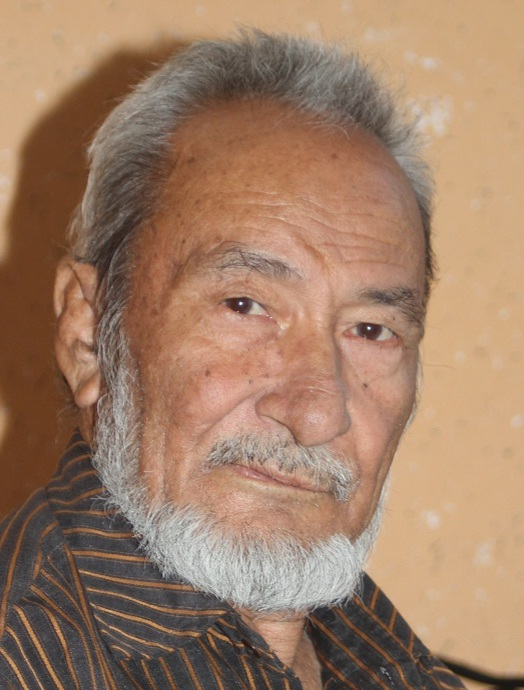
- Born: 1942; Herat, Afghanistan
- Died: 22 December 2017 (aged 74–75)
- Other name: Nasrullah Sarwari
- Education: Kabul University
- Occupations: Painter, educator
- Known for: photography, painting, drawing
- Style: Naturalism, realism, abstract style, abstract expressionism

Nasrollah Sarvari (1942 – 22 December 2017) was an Afghan painter and educator. His works often deal with historical, philosophical, natural landscapes, and the social life of the villagers. He was familiar with the styles of Romanticism, Realism and Classicism and was a follower of Behzad Heravi's style in miniature art.

== Life ==
Sarvari was born in 1942, in Herat, Afghanistan, and began painting at the age of nine.

He studied art history and art for many years, and studied art under Khair Mohammad Khan Yari, Karim Shah Khan, Golmohammad Honarjoo, Behzad Saljuqi and Yousef Kohzad. Sarvari graduated from Kabul University with a degree in telecommunications.

Sarvari won many awards in Afghanistan for his artwork. He spent many years of his life in Iran. Sarvari is the founder of the Jihad Landscape Museum in Herat. His works were curated by his nephew, Faridollah Adib Ahein, in the collection "The Azure Road".

== Death ==
Sarvari died in December 2017. Following his death, the artists pointed out the neglect of artists' lives by the people and the government, noting that the lives and deaths of artists in poverty is one of the consequences.
