= Char Chatta Bazaar =

Covered marketplace in Kabul, Afghanistan

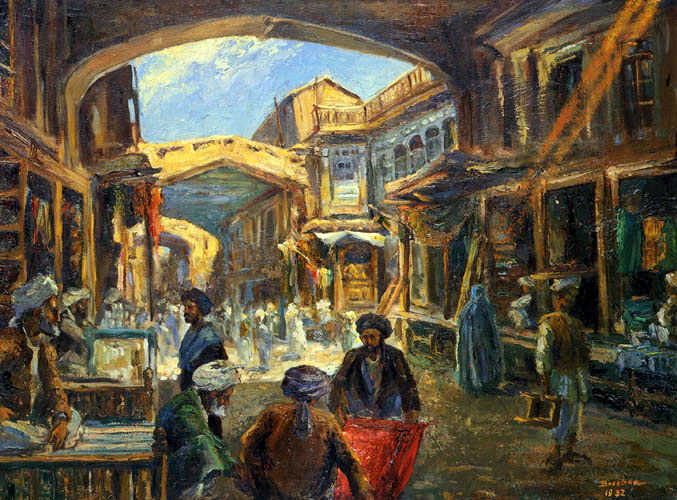
The Char-Chatta Bazaar of Kabul (1932) by A. Gh. Brechna

The Char Chatta Bazaar of Kabul was a covered marketplace in Kabul, Afghanistan, built in the 17th century by Ali Mardan Khan, the Mughal governor of Kabul during the reign of Shah Jahan. It was more than 200 metres long, and consisted of four arcades whose walls were covered with "stucco decoration studded with mirrors, and whitewashed with a special solution containing bits of mica to make them sparkle".

It was destroyed in 1842 by a British force led by General George Pollock.
