= Safia Tarzi =

Afghan fashion designer

- صفیه طرزی
- Born: 1939
- Died: 1976 (aged 36–37); Paris, France

Safia Tarzi, (Pashto: صفیه طرزي) (1939-1976 ) was a fashion designer, balloonist, photograph, model.

== Biography ==
She was born in 1939.

Much of Safia Tarzi's early childhood is unknown; however, she is the daughter of an Afghan ambassador and was referred to as Princess Safia Tarzi by the Sarasota Journal. Safia Tarzi is also a relative of Soraya Tarzi, the Queen of Afghanistan, she was an adventurous soul, traveling and living in places like Paris. She almost got stranded in Dashtc Archi due to a leaky car radiator, after, she also had a passion for hot air balloons, unfortunately, she died when several hot balloons crashed.

Safia Tarzi was a pioneering Afghan fashion designer. She had her own fashion studio in Kabul, at a time when her profession was a new one in Afghanistan.

In the 1960s and 1970s, Afghanistan was undergoing a rapid modernization process under Mohammed Daoud Khan. Kabul was known as the "Paris of Central Asia", and women of the Urban middle- and upper classes had been dressing in Western fashion in public ever since queen Humaira Begum had appeared without a veil in 1959., this was encouraged by the government since it provided an image of modernity, and many women engaged in the new fashion industry in Kabul, where fashion shows were held attended by women of the royal family. Safia Tarzi was to become one of the most famed of the pioneering Afghan designers.

Safia Tarzi was known for her characteristic feminized turbans and waistcoats. In her design, she mixed traditional Afghan colorful embroidery, fabrics and furs with Western clothing models, and challenged traditional conceptions on what was considered masculine and feminine, urban and rural, Western and Oriental.

She also enjoyed international fame in the 1960s and 1970s. In 1969, British Vogue selected Afghanistan as the location of a high fashion photo shoot, and made an editorial about Safia Tarzi.

== Carnival of Fashion in Kabul Hotel Vogue ==
Safia Tarzi was selected by Vogue and had her fashion show at the Kabul Hotel, where high-profile people attended, helping the Afghan economy. Safia Tarzi's fashion show displayed her style, which comprised the latest Afghan designs at the time, featuring colorful colors or winter fur outfits. Model Parwin Serji wore a black karakul suit teker; model Sediqi wore a satin gown trimmed with Kandahari patki embroidery. This was especially different because this style was used on shawls worn by men. Many more models were showing off Safia Tarzi's design, having used materials all locally produced.
