= Hamida Barmaki =

- Born: 4 January 1970; Kabul, Afghanistan
- Died: 28 January 2011 (aged 41); Kabul, Afghanistan
- Occupations: Law Professor and Human Rights Activist
- Organization(s): Kabul University; Afghan Independent Human Rights Commission; Max Planck Institute for Comparative Public Law and International Law

Hamida Barmaki (Dari: حمیده برمکی; 4 January 1970 – 28 January 2011) was a renowned Afghan law professor and human rights activist. She was killed together with her family in a suicide attack.

== Academic career ==
Hamida Barmaki was born in Kabul on 4 January 1970. After attending Ariana High School in Kabul (1977–1987), she studied law at the Faculty of Law and Political Sciences of Kabul University. Her outstanding academic achievements enabled her to become one of the first women in Afghanistan to follow a career in the judicial service. From 1990–1991, Barmaki was enrolled in the Attorney General's Office's postgraduate training course to learn more about the practice of law. After this time, she returned to Kabul University as a law professor (1992–2011).

Barmaki's academic focus covered the fundamental issues of civil law. She was one of the few Afghan scholars who had studied in depth both the Islamic and the Romano-Germanic sources of law, which form the basis of the hybrid laws constituting the Afghan legal system. Her works include numerous journal articles and books in the Dari language, including an academic thesis on the "Interpretation of Statutes" (Kabul University, 2002) and a master thesis in English (University of Bologna, unpublished, 2004). Her last work, a large volume on the law of obligation, remained uncompleted. The objective of Barmaki's academic work was to provide a thorough understanding of the difficult Afghan legal system. For this purpose she used not only the classical methods of interpretation of Islamic and secular law, but also relied on comparative legal analysis as a tool to find solutions to legal problems inherent in other legal systems. She studied the relevant literature written in Dari, English, and Arabic to achieve these ends. At the university, Professor Barmaki was admired by her students and colleagues for her analytical skills and her patient and friendly manner towards everyone she met.

In addition to having graduated from the Faculty of Law and Political Sciences of Kabul University, she obtained a master's degree in Development, Innovation and Change (MiDIC) from the University of Bologna, Italy. In December 2010, she received an invitation from the Max Planck Institute for Comparative and International Private Law (Hamburg, Germany) for a research stay to begin working on her doctorate in law. At her home faculty, Hamida Barmaki struggled to establish an LL.M. program which she believed to be an essential tool for the development of a new generation of excellent lawyers, which were urgently needed in Afghanistan.

== Political work ==
Outside of her academic career, Hamida Barmaki was actively concerned with human rights from an early age. As a young broadcaster with Radio Television Afghanistan (1985–1987), she already developed a special interest in women's rights. In the middle of the civil war, she wrote an essay entitled "Women's Role in the Social Reconstruction of Afghanistan" (Afghanistan-i-Fardah booklet, 1993). She combined her academic work with a non-violent, strenuous political struggle to promote the rights of the most vulnerable members of Afghan society. After the fall of the Taliban regime, Hamida Barmaki could work in public and was immediately appointed to important positions with high amounts of responsibility. She served as a member of the Women's Council of Kabul University (2002–2011) and as a representative in the Emergency Loya Jirga (2002) and the Peace Jirga (2009). She founded her own human rights organisation, "Khorasan Legal Service Organisation", in 2009. KLSO's main aim was raising citizens' awareness of their rights and providing free legal assistance to women and other marginalized groups. In the same year in which KLSO was founded, Hamida Barmaki was mentioned by the Presidential Palace as a possible candidate to become the Minister of Women's Affairs (Afghanistan).

From March 2008 until her death, Hamida Barmaki worked as Representative of the Max Planck Institute for Comparative Public Law and International Law (MPIL), a research institute based in Heidelberg (Germany). Together with an Afghan-German team of researchers, she initiated and implemented projects aimed at modernizing the legislation and the judicial institutions of the country, especially the Afghan Supreme Court, and the development of an academic culture in legal sciences on an international level.

Previous significant positions included those of Project Coordinator of the Institut International Pour Les Études Comparatives (IIPEC), Head of the Law and Political Sciences Department at the National Center for Policy Research of Kabul University (2006–2008), Legal Advisor to the Afghanistan Research and Evaluation Unit (AREU) (2006), Director of the Women's Islamic Rights Awareness Program of The Asia Foundation (2004), Program Manager of the Afghan Women Lawyers' Council (2003–2004), Member of the UNIFEM Gender and Law Commission (2003–2004), and Deputy Dean of the Faculty of Law and Political Sciences (2002).

== Child Rights Commissioner of the AIHRC ==
In 2009 Hamida Barmaki was appointed Child Rights Commissioner of the Afghan Independent Human Rights Commission (AIHRC) while additionally keeping her responsibilities with the Max Planck Institute. Through her new position, she gained not only a nationwide but an international reputation. Hamida Barmaki was deeply concerned about the vulnerability of children in war-torn Afghanistan and travelled to many provinces to consult with AIHRC staff and investigate cases. She even commissioned research and openly criticized the government. Among the research conducted was a study on child abuse indicating an increase in the number of such incidents. Immediately after the publication of the study, Hamida Barmaki initiated the first MPIL-AIHRC seminar on women and children's rights. Meanwhile, her struggle against the recruitment of minors by the Afghan security force and against the practice of bacha bazi (sexual slavery of boys), was just becoming effective. A mutual agreement between the respective representatives of the Afghan state and the United Nations was planned to be signed two days after her killing. Professor Barmaki was also concerned about child marriage. Together with civil society activists, academics, and lawyers from state institutions, she developed marriage forms and other tools aimed at bettering the protection of female minors.

Hamida Barmaki also took a clear position in the ongoing discussion on the relevance of customary law in the justice system of Afghanistan. Based upon her experience with many human rights cases she strongly advocated a modern, Western-style court system as had existed until the Afghan civil war, and opposed proposals to formalize traditional institutions and forms of conflict resolution, such as the Pashtun jirgas, which are notorious for ignoring human and especially women and children's rights.

== Death and commemoration ==
On Friday 28 January 2011, Hamida Barmaki, her husband Dr. Massoud Yama (born 1968), a medical doctor at the Sardar Mohammad Daoud Khan Hospital and Director of Monitoring and Evaluation of Deputy Minister of Finance for Policy and Senior National Adviser for Cluster Secretariat, and their four children, Narwan Dunia (born 1995), Wira Sahar (born 1997), Marghana Nila (born 2000), and Ahmad Belal (born 2007) were all killed in a suicide attack on the "Finest" supermarket in Kabul.

At least two other people died in the incident and seventeen were injured. Among the dead was a young female judge called Najia, daughter of Siddiqullah Sahel, who had met Hamida Barmaki through the judicial training program organized by the Max Planck Institute for the Supreme Court. Both Hezbi Islami as well as the Taliban claimed responsibility for the murder. However, a man who later confessed, and was convicted for, his involvement in the attack said he belonged to the Haqqani network. The attack was completely unexpected, as such incidents rarely happen during the Afghan weekend. The background of the attack remained unclear; it might have been directed against staff of the private security company Academi (formerly named Blackwater and Xe), against French diplomats, or against a high-ranking Afghan politician. Commentators sharply criticized the fact that the Afghan government was openly involved in "peace talks" with the same organizations that claimed responsibility for this act of extreme violence against civilians.

More than two thousand friends and colleagues came to the Shohada-e Salehin Cemetery when the family was buried on 29 January 2011. Over ten thousand paid their respect to the family in a memorial ceremony in Kabul's large Id Gah Mosque. International media such as the New York Times, the Frankfurter Allgemeine Zeitung and La Repubblica reported on the event.

The AIHRC organized an impressive mourning ceremony on 1 February 2011. Immediately after her death, Hamida Barmaki began to be remembered as a "shahid" ("martyr"). However, there were also voices speaking out against the use of this term which is likewise employed by terrorist organisations and does not reflect the peaceful and tolerant character of Hamida Barmaki. The discussion over her commemoration solidifies her as a symbolic figure in Afghanistan.

Plans made by academic friends to establish a memorial site on the campus of Kabul University and a modern law library named after her at the Faculty of Law and Political Sciences were blocked by university officials despite the fact that the German government had offered the necessary funding. The Max Planck Institute donated a painted portrait that had already been produced for the library to the AIHRC. A request to name the roundabout in front of the Finest supermarket after her is pending with the President of Afghanistan.

Some of Hamida Barmaki's closest colleagues established the Hamida Barmaki Organization for the Rule of Law (HBORL) in Kabul. This non-governmental and non-profit organization was named after her in honor of her tremendous commitment to strengthening the rule of law and human rights in Afghanistan. Moreover, the Max Planck Foundation for International Peace and Rule of Law named an academic program after her and offers "Hamida Barmaki Ph.D. Scholarships" to Afghan jurists and particularly law lecturers. Until 2016, the Hamida Barmaki Organization and the Max Planck Foundation worked closely together.

Leicester University (UK) and Graz University (Austria) organized events to remember Professor Barmaki's engagement in the areas of rule of law and human rights.

Her sister, poet Abeda Sakhi, wrote "The Garden" in her memory.

== Selected publications ==
- 2008– Law of Obligations (teaching booklet, Kabul University 2008)
- 2007/2008– Causes of Political Instability and Possible Options for its Improvement in Afghanistan (National Centre for Policy Research, Kabul University)
- 2007– Women's Political Rights in Islam (article, published in Hoquq Magazine of the Faculty of Law and Political Sciences).
- 2006– Women's Rights in Islam and Afghanistan's Statutes (booklet, published in June 2006 by The Asia Foundation, Kabul).
- 2006– Reba and the Reasons of its Prevention (article, published in 'Adalat magazine of the Ministry of Justice).
- 2006– Individual Contracts (article, published in Hoquq Magazine of the Faculty of Law and Political Sciences).
- 2005– Women's Role in the Reconstruction of Afghanistan, Women's Integration in the Labor Market, Status in Exile and the Development of ICT (master thesis, Bologna University, Italy).
- 2004– Violence against Women (article, published in Human Rights Magazine, Kabul).
- 2004– Political Idioms of the Constitution and the Agreement of Bonn (National Centre of Policy Research, Kabul University)
- 2004– Polygamy (article, published by Human Rights Magazine, Kabul).
- 2004– Afghan Women's Political Rights (article, published by Human Rights Magazine).
- 2003– Peaceful Approaches towards Solving Conflicts (article, published by ICRC Magazine, Kabul).
- 2002– Interpretation of Statutes (academic thesis, published by Kabul University).
- 1993– Women's Role in the Social Reconstruction of Afghanistan (published in Afghanistan-i- Fardah booklet).
- 1991– Robbery in Criminal Investigation (academic paper, published by Kabul University).
