= Malina Suliman =

Afghan artist (born 1990)

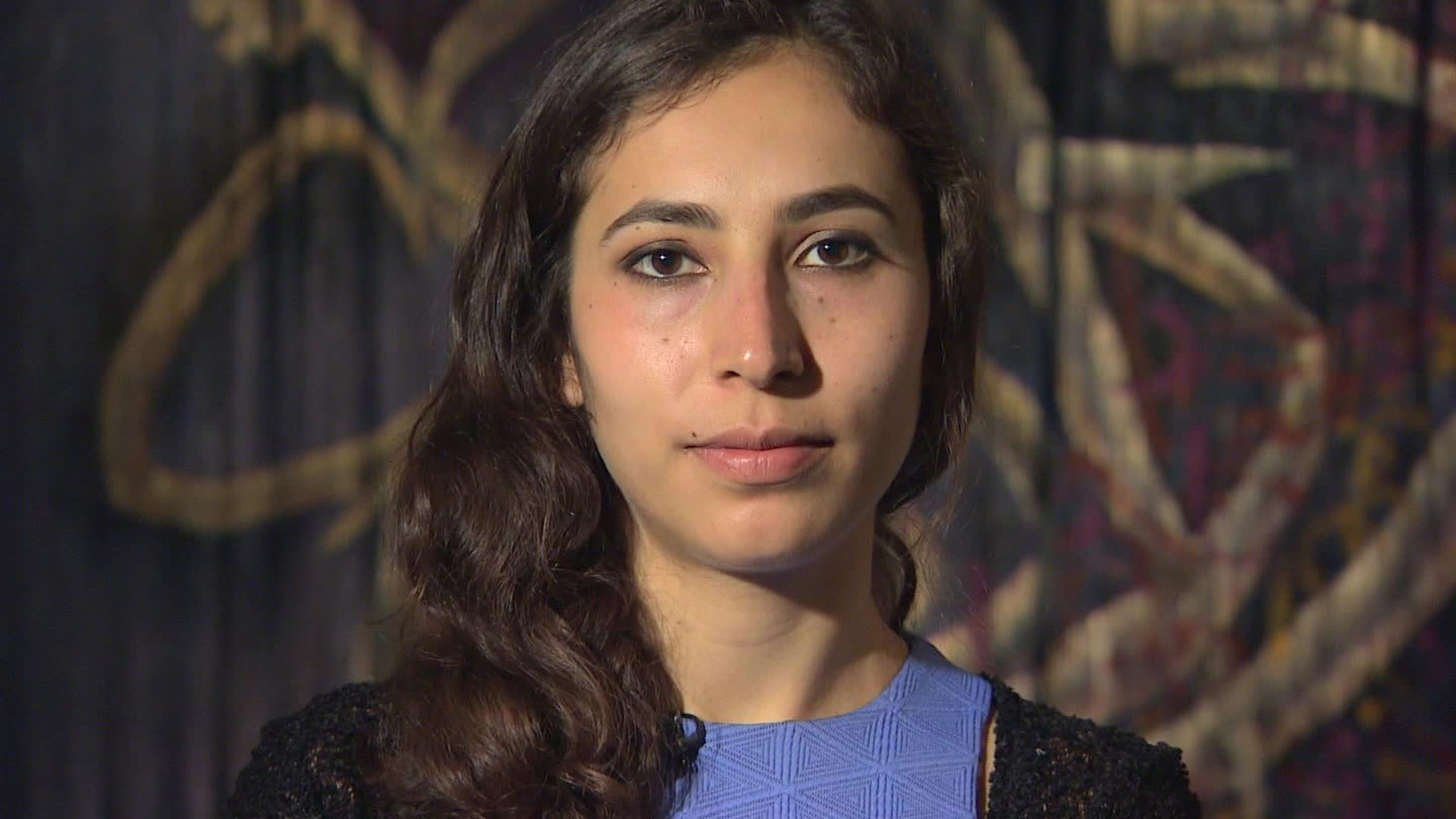
- Born: 1990 (age 35–36); Kandahar, Republic of Afghanistan
- Education: Sir J. J. School of Art; Dutch Art Institute
- Known for: Graffiti art, painting, installation art
- Notable work: Skeleton in a Burqa
- Movement: Contemporary art

Malina Suliman (born 1990) is an Afghan graffiti artist, metalworker and painter. She was born in Kabul. As a child, she and her family were forced to flee her home province to live in Kandahar, Afghanistan. Her work is considered to challenge traditional Muslim culture like the burqa. According to Suliman, "The burqa is a way of controlling, but in the name of respect. Every culture or religion gives a different name for the burqa. It is honor, culture, and religion. Really, it just controls the woman and keeps her inside." Malina's work has gained the attention of the Taliban and traditional Muslims, resulting in having received threats from the Taliban towards Suliman and her family. The artist was subject to physical threats, rocks have been thrown at her as she conducts her work.

Not only does Malina worry about the Taliban, but her family who disagrees with her decision to create art. Creating art that displays the human body like Malina's motif, the skeleton in a burqa, is seen as idol worship. To the Taliban and other traditional Muslims, Malina's artwork is un-Islamic and Suliman's parents were embarrassed. Because of this her parents went the distance and locked Malina in their house for nearly a year, which had the opposite effect they were hoping for. Malina claimed that, “Today, whatever I am doing for art, it’s all because of that one year in which I was staying in a home.” Suliman spends her time holding art exhibits around the world. In December 2019, Malina intended to hold a lecture on the colonization of art in Rome but it was canceled.

== Education ==
Suliman studied Realism Art in Pakistan, without the knowledge of her father, and eventually received her bachelor's degree at the Art Council Karachi of Fine Arts but her studies were cut short when her parents asked her to return home. She was kept at home for year without access to internet. While she was in Kabul, she joined the Berang Arts Association where she picked up graffiti through workshops.

In 2013, an attack on her father pushed the family to move to Mumbai, India. There, she studied at the Sir J.J School of Art. In 2014, She relocated to the Netherlands where she started her M.A at the Dutch Art Institute.

== Career ==
Malina had an interest in art since childhood. She described her interest as art attracting her instinctively so she could feel it inside her. While Malina was home for the ten months, she felt she lost her identity, and it had a large impact. It wasn't until her sister's husband took her to an exhibit that she found her identity again. "I started shouting and crying, and I felt like I was back, and I existed again."-Malina Suliman. It was then that began to do art despite the knowledge that she would receive resistance from her family and from other people. Her writing of the graffiti attracted comments from passersby. She would also get assaulted by people throwing rocks, who followed her if she tried to relocate. The Taliban was the most vocal against her work. They have said that Suliman's work is idol-worshipping and anti-Islam. This resulted in violent actions taken against Suliman and her family. Once Malina started holding her exhibits, she received threats warning her not to attend her own exhibits. In one exhibit in Kandahar, she attracted the attention of the Governor, Tooryalai Wesa, who praised her work hoping that "more women would do the same." Suliman's art earned her an invitation to President Hamid Karzai's palace to showcase her work in a private viewing. She also joined a local art group, the Kandahar Fine Arts Association, to bring an art scene that would be alive in her deeply conservative hometown.

The group was all male and relatively small but has gained many female artists since. In 2015, Malina participated in a painting and sculpture exhibition at the French Cultural Center in Kabul. The same year, Suliman's work was the focus of a solo exhibition at the Art Represent gallery in Bethnal Green, London. The show, entitled 'Beyond the Veil: A Decontextualization', saw the installation of a number of burqas, each inscribed with the wishes and aspirations of Afghan citizens in a traditional form of calligraphy. A movie released in 2016 called 'Tasting the Moon' featuring Malina Suliman, Shamsia Hassani, and Nabila Horakhsh. The movie is about First Generation of Afghan Female Contemporary Artists and contains a trilogy of impressionistic dream sequences inspired by re-occurring metaphors in each artist's work.

== Art ==
Malina's art didn't become political until she moved back to Afghanistan. After seeing the discrimination she and other women faced, Suliman's art sought to advocate for women's rights in Afghanistan. Her most famous graffiti art is the image of a skeleton wearing a blue burqa. Suliman always felt like the burqa controlled her as child. To Malina, the skeleton is a self portrait that means a lack of identity for women in Afghanistan, inequality because women are treated as second class citizens in Afghan, and oppression for the women who are killed asking for rights. One of her more morbid and darker works includes a gruesome scene in the aftermath of a suicide bombing. Malina depicts the reaction of people in a statement during an interview. “Many people had never seen an art installation... Some were offended and others were hurt because they’d experienced it before." Suliman's work is very personal as well. She experienced a suicide bombing at an exhibit but made it out safely without any injuries.

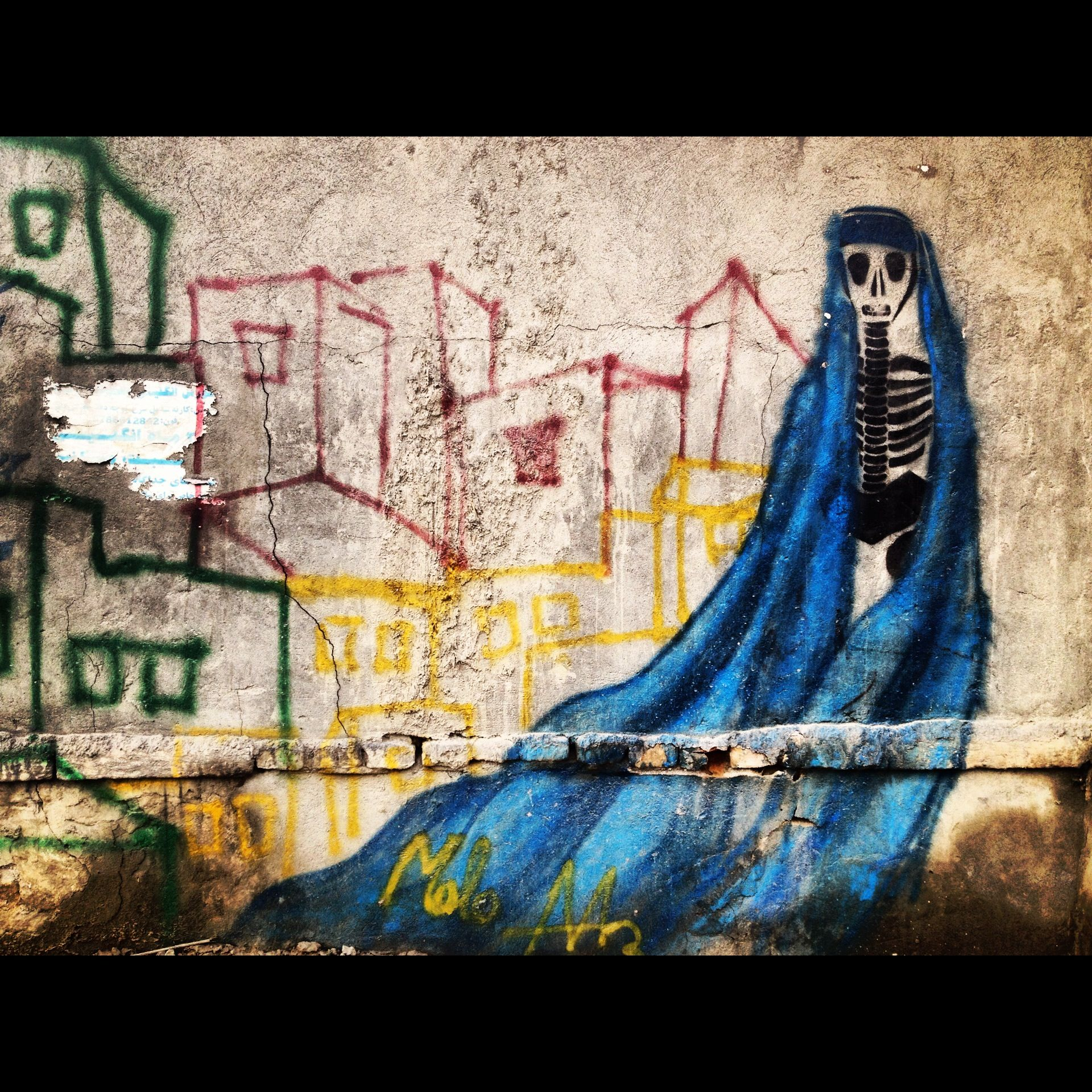
Skeleton in a Burqa

Malina also faces the reality of being a controversial figure in Afghanistan, knowing that she could be killed for her art. Graffiti art is typically seen as dangerous because it is illegal, adding another layer to Suliman's controversial approach to art. Not only does her art covers the political and war scene of Afghan but she also covers her life and parents in an artwork titled "Today's Life". This painting depicts a fetus in a womb that is suspended from tree being pulled in different directions. For Malina, her fate had already been decided before she was born. “Before a child is born, the parents are already thinking that a son can support them and a daughter can be married off to a wealthy suitor. They don’t stop to think what the child may want." For Malina, her art is a form of resistance against the Taliban and traditional rules. Although the spotlight on her is dangerous in Afghanistan, Malina wants to challenge politics, culture, and women's rights. Malina said in an interview, "I felt like OK, if I don’t say something, who will?" For this reason, Malina uses graffiti, to "give voice to the walls" in Afghanistan. Her piece "Girl In The Ice-Box" depicts a girl who is stuck in a box representing Afghan culture, holding women hostage.
