= Samira Kitman =

Samira Kitman (born 1986) is an Afghanistan-born calligrapher and miniaturist currently living in Isleworth in west London.

== Early life ==
Her parents fled to Pakistan to avoid the troubles, where they lived as refugees during her early childhood. They returned to Kabul in 2002.

== Career ==
She learned her craft with the Turquoise Mountain Foundation and went on to organise the contract that provided Afghan miniature painting, ceramics and woodwork to the brand new five-star Anjum Hotel in Mecca which is used by wealthy pilgrims. She employed fifteen women calligraphers. The contract worth £175,000 was for 6,000 illuminated Quranic verses to decorate the five-star hotel. She and her artists had 11 weeks to complete the intricate ink lettering with swirls of green and gold watercolour.

She was voted Afghan businesswoman of the year, has been praised by Prince Charles and has had her art displayed at the Victoria and Albert museum in London and the Smithsonian in Washington.

She created Maftah-e Hunar, an arts foundation which trained eighty young, deprived women to become artists and make a living. In 2016 she featured in We Are Afghan Women, a book by the former American first lady Laura Bush.

== Asylum claim ==
Kitman’s high profile brought her to the attention of militants, and she applied for asylum to the United Kingdom and was located by the Home Office in Lancaster. Her application was refused, an appeal lodged then on 18 March 2017, before the appeal the Home Office reversed its decision: “They advised that after reviewing their decision they hadn’t realised the extent of Samira’s profile in Afghanistan and internationally and that due to her profile she would be at risk.”

== Sources ==
- Pidd, Helen (21 March 2017a). "From businesswoman of the year to £5 a day in a shared house". The Guardian.
- "24yr-old Afghan woman wins the Best Woman Entrepreneur Award". wadsam.com. Wadsam. 15 March 2015.
- Pidd (26 March 2017b). "Afghan artist wins asylum claim following Guardian report". The Guardian.
