= Mohammad Maimangi =

Afghan painter

- غلام محمد میمنگی
- Born: 1873
- Died: 1935 (aged 61–62)
- Known for: painting, drawing
- Style: realism

Gholam Mohammad Maimangi (1873 –1935), was a prominent Afghan painter.

== Life ==
Maimangi was the founder of School of Fine Arts in Kabul. He is considered one of the painters of the second golden age of Realism in Afghanistan, along with Karim Shah Khan, Abdul Ghafoor Breshna, Ghulam Mohieddin Shabnam, Hafiz Pakzad and Akbar Khorasani.
