= Rada Akbar =

Afghan visual artist and photographer (b.10 May 1988)

- رادا اکبر
- Born: 1988 (age 37–38); Afghanistan
- Occupations: Conceptual artist, photographer
- Awards: BBC's 100 Women (2021); Prince Claus Seed Award (2021)

Rada Akbar (Pashto: رادا اکب; born 1988), is an Afghan-born conceptual artist, and photographer. The focus of her artwork has been to denounce the oppression of women, and ask the world to see the strength of Afghan women through her artwork and photographic portraits. She was chosen as one of the BBC's 100 most influential women of 2021.

== Biography ==
Rada Akba was born on 1988 in Afghanistan, during the Soviet–Afghan War which lasted from 1978 to 1992. She often spent her childhood in a basement to avoid bombs. The family lived in Pakistan for six years.

In 2013, she started working as a freelance photographer and setting up modern art shows in Kabul. From 2018 to 2021, Akbar organized the "Superwomen" (or "Abarzanan") exhibition, to commemorate International Women's Day, March 8. The "Superwomen" project has featured artworks — including exquisitely crafted gowns — gowns that represent poets, mountain climbers, television presenters, royalty, politicians and musicians who rose to prominence within Afghanistan's patriarchal culture.

In 2021, she received the Prince Claus Seed Award. In September 2021, she was one of the people evacuated by the French government after the Taliban returned to power in Afghanistan and before the American military fled. She was transferred by bus from the French embassy to the airport and arrived in Paris, where she had to quarantine due to COVID-19.

Her work was part of the 2022 group exhibition, Before Silence: Afghan Artists in Exile by PEN America's Artists at Risk Connection and Art at a Time Like.

== See also ==
- List of Afghan women artists
