= Manoocher Deghati =

Iranian-French photojournalist

Manoocher Deghati (Persian: منوچهر دقتی, born 1954 in Urmia, Iran) is an Iranian-French photojournalist.

== Documenting the Iranian Revolution ==
In the summer of 1978, Manoocher Deghati, educated as a filmmaker, returned to Iran after three years of studies at the Rome school of cinema just as the first major demonstrations against the regime of the Shah were breaking out. He decided to photograph these events.

I remember going out the first day with a camera in hand. There was a great deal of agitation. A truckload of soldiers rolled by. One of them loaded his rifle and fired at me. The burst of bullets passed on either side of my head. I was alive. I was shocked. But above all, I realized that I was a target because I was taking pictures. That only reinforced my determination to take pictures.

In 1979, the Sipa Press agency had asked him to become a permanent correspondent in Iran. Manoocher photographed all the big events of the new regime of Khomeini, the hostage crisis at the American embassy and the Iran-Iraq war, which he covered for six years.

In order to be able to go to the front independently of 'tours' organized expressly for foreign journalists, one had to agree not to send any photos abroad...As for me, I wanted to break down censorship and barriers, to show really what the battlefields looked like before they had been tidied up for official pictures. I had to do without the agreements with state organisms to which I promised pictures for military publications or propaganda posters. To do that, one had to negotiate for months. Despite the distrust of officials, they needed my eye, my specialty. Each time, I was accompanied by at least two "bodyguards." They closely watched what pictures I was taking, gave me a quota of films. They kept track of them, sometimes destroying the negatives or censoring them. Many images disappeared, but I succeeded anyway in preserving and distributing a good part of my work.

In 1983, Manoocher Deghati received the "World Press" first prize in the news category for the photos included here of the Iran-Iraq War.

In 1985, Manoocher was forbidden to leave his home carrying a camera. So he left Iran and went into exile in France. In 1987, Agence France-Presse asked him to assume the direction of the agency's first regional bureau in Central America. Manoocher followed the guerrilla war in El Salvador, the fight between Contras and Sandinistas in Nicaragua, the civil war in Guatemala, and the American incursion in Panama.

"What interested me most was to cover the different stages in the peace process which took place in that period," he says. To witness the absurdity of war, while showing the values of peace is what Manoocher continued to do thereafter, in the Middle East as in North Africa and former Yugoslavia.

== Post 1990 ==
In 1990, he covered the Persian Gulf War. From 1991 to 1995 he was working as director of the AFP Middle East regional photo service. He notably photographed the rise of Islamist militancy in Egypt, the war and famine in Sudan and Somalia. Leaving that region for reportage in ex-Yugoslavia, he returned to follow the first steps of Israeli-Palestinian negotiations. From 1995, based in Jerusalem for AFP, he concentrated on this question,

With his brother Reza, he co-founded Webistan Photo Agency which has been distributing their own images but also those of several other photographers since 1991.

In September 1996, Manoocher was gravely wounded by an Israeli sniper in Ramallah, on the West Bank of the Jordan, during a confrontation between Israelis and Palestinians. Repatriated to France, he spent two years in physical therapy at the Invalides hospital for war veterans. He used this time to interview and report on the veterans of all the French wars of this century, from the "poilus" of 1914–18 to the UN blue helmets wounded in ex-Yugoslavia. Since December 1998, Manoocher has worked for the AFP bureau in Paris.

From 1998 to 2001, Manoocher covered the international and national stories for the Agence France Presse. In 2000, he was wounded covering the visit of the French Prime Minister, Lionel Jospin, in Ramallah, Palestine. When he recovered from his wounds, he went to Afghanistan in 2002 to found Aina Photo which has become the first and most important supplier of photographs from that country. Aina Photo which is part of Aina NGO (founded by Reza Deghati) aims at providing all necessary material to Afghan photojournalists to become independent and self-reliant.

In 2011 Manoocher Deghati was appointed as Middle East Regional Photo Editor for the Associated Press,, a role which he covered for four years. Since 2014 he has lived in Apulia, in southern Italy, where he works as a freelance photographer.

== Exhibitions ==
In summer 2025 his exhibition 'Eyewitness: Guerra e Pace' opened in the streets of Martina Franca, staged in partnership with the Fondazione Paolo Grassi as a special event during the Festival della Valle d'Itria. In autumn 2025 a further exhibition of 42 of Deghati's photographs opened in Ostuni, Apulia, at the House of Lucie.

== Awards ==
- 1980 American Deadline Press Club, Special Achievement Prize.
- 1983 World Press Photo, 1st Prize.
- 1986 World Press Photo, 3rd Prize.
- 1996 11th International Festival of SCOOP and Journalism in Angers, 1st Prize.
- 2001 Georges Benderheim Prize, Paris
- 2004 Howard Chapnick Award for Advancement of Photojournalism, New York
- Fuji Prize, 1st Prize in France
- AFP Best Picture of the month : March 1991, August 1992, July 1994, October 1995, March 1996, February 2000
