= Shamsia Hassani =

Afghan artist (born 1988)

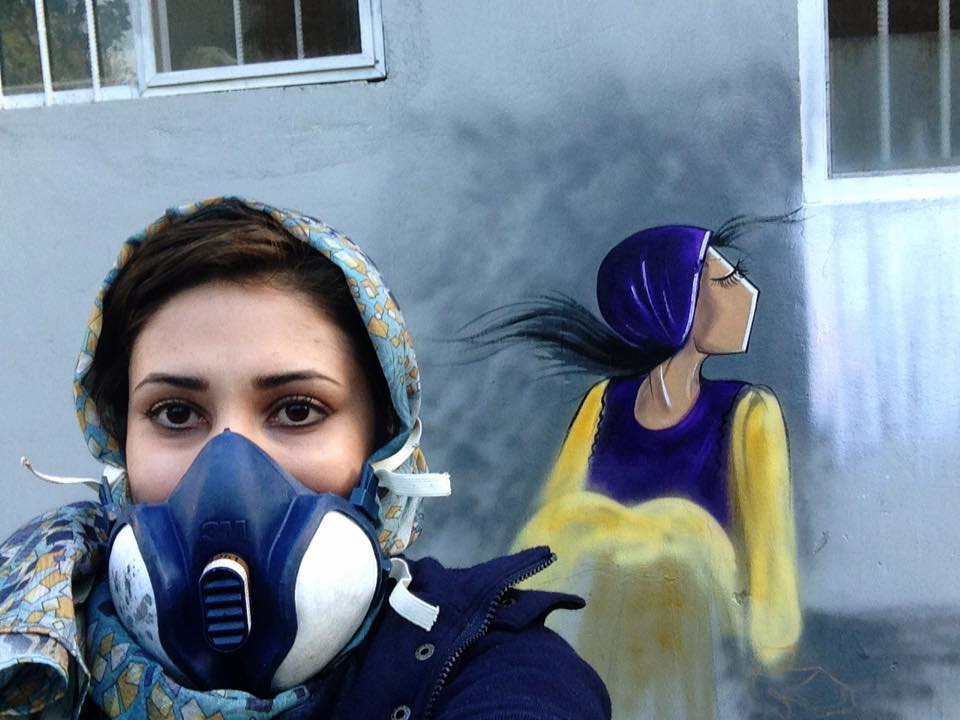
- Born: Ommolbanin Hassani; 9 April 1988 (age 38); Tehran, Iran
- Education: Kabul University (BA, MFA)
- Occupations: Artist, Lecturer
- Years active: 2010–present
- Known for: Street artist, graffiti artist
- Website: shamsiahassani.net

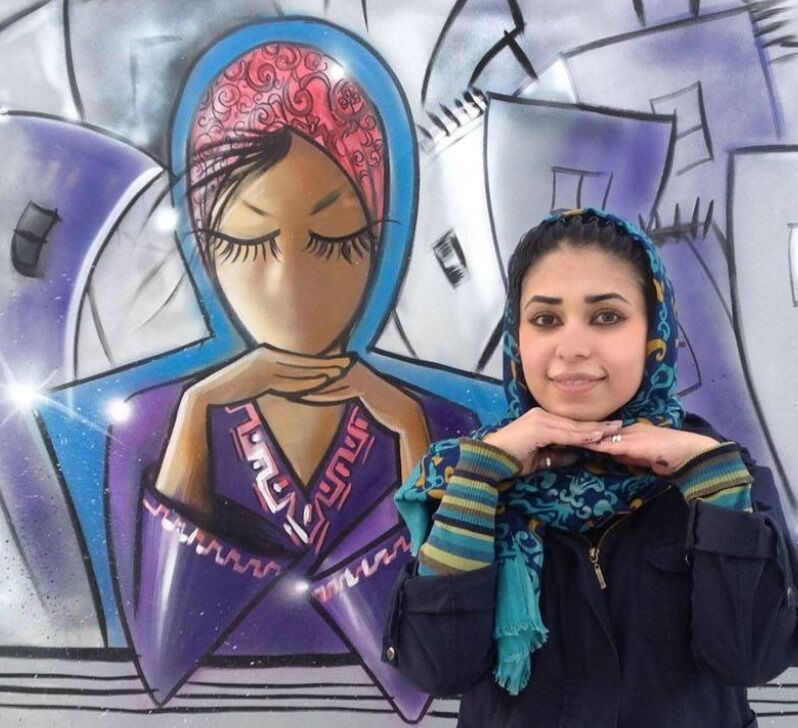
Shamsia Hassani in Afghanistan

Shamsia Hassani (Dari:شمسیه حسنی; née Ommolbanin Hassani; born 9 April 1988 in Iran to refugee Afghan parents) is an Afghan street artist, a fine arts lecturer, and the associate professor of Drawing and Anatomy Drawing at the Kabul University. She has popularized "street art" in the streets of Kabul and has exhibited her art in several countries including India, Iran, Germany, United States of America, Switzerland, Vietnam, Norway, Australia, Denmark, Turkey, Italy, Canada, and in diplomatic missions in Kabul. Hassani paints graffiti in Kabul to bring awareness to the war years. In 2014, Hassani was named one of FP's top 100 global thinkers. She was recognized as one of the BBC's 100 women of 2021.

== Biography ==
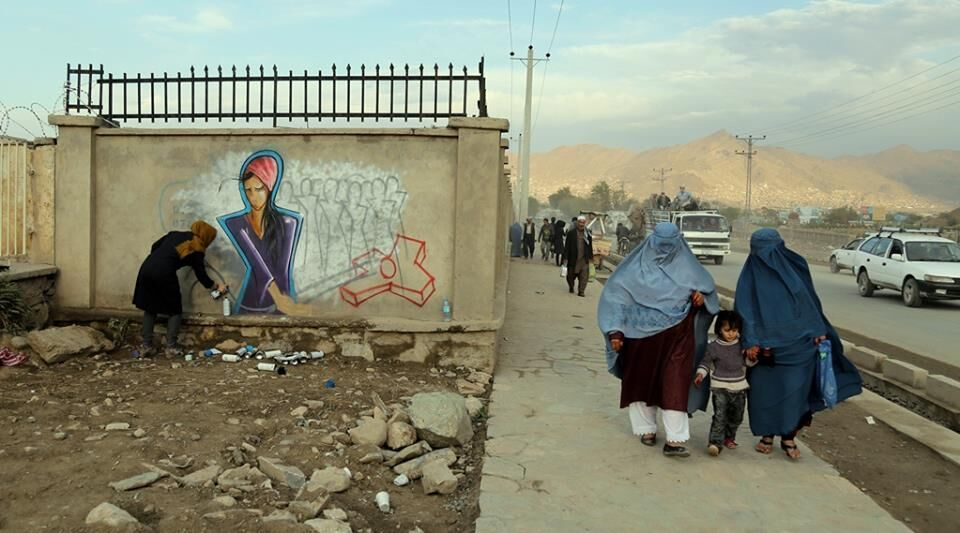
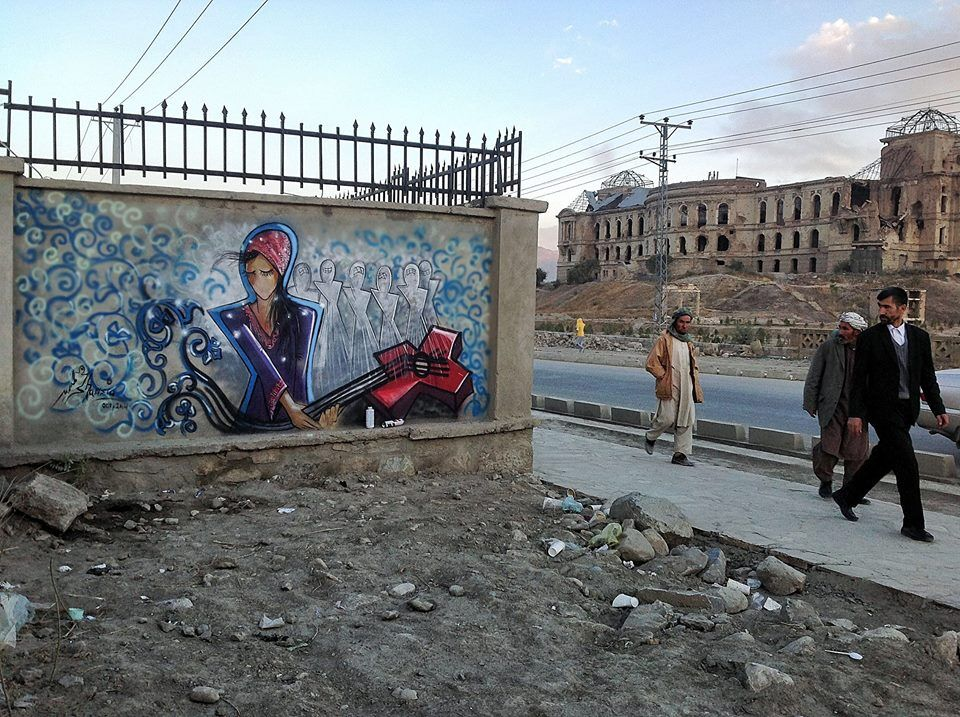
Graffiti at Darul Aman Palace, Kabul by Hassani

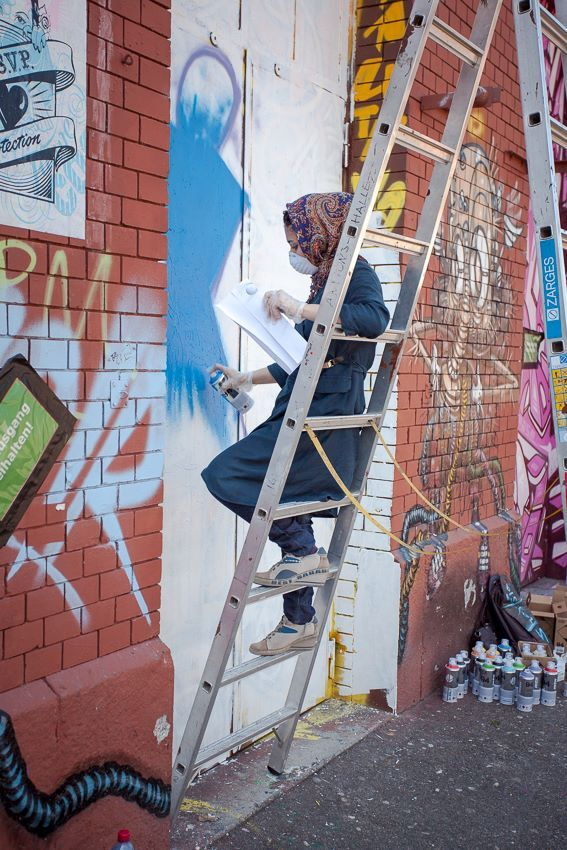
Graffiti in Switzerland by Shamsia Hassani

Hassani was born in 1988 and spent her childhood in Tehran, Iran; her parents had temporarily immigrated there, from Kandahar, Afghanistan during the war. Hassani showed interest in painting from a young age, however while in school, Hassani lacked access to art classes as it was not permitted to Afghans in Iran at the time. Upon her and her family's return to Afghanistan to Kabul in 2004, she pursued a degree at Kabul University in Arts. Hassani received a BA degree in Arts in 2010, and a master's degree in Visual Arts in 2014, from Kabul University in Afghanistan.

She later began lecturing and eventually became the associate professor of Drawing and Anatomy Drawing at Kabul University, establishing Berang Arts, a contemporary art collective. Creating colorful graffiti, Hassani works to mask the negativity of war. She claims that, "image has more effect than words, and it's a friendly way to fight." She also uses her art to fight for women's rights, reminding people of the tragedies women have faced and continue to face in Afghanistan.

Hassani studied the art of graffiti in Kabul in December 2010 during a workshop organized by an anonymous artisan group named Combat Communications and an Afghanistan woman empowerment group Mountain2Mountain; Where the London street artist CHU was invited to teach. Following the workshop, Hassani began to practice graffiti art on walls in the war-torn streets of Kabul. One of her works is on the walls of Kabul's Cultural Centre, and features a burqa clad woman seated below a stairway. The inscription below it reads (in English), "The water can come back to a dried-up river, but what about the fish that died?" In order to avoid public harassment and claims of her work being "un-Islamic", she completes her work quickly.

Hassani traveled out of the country before the fall of the Afghan government. When the Taliban returned to power in Afghanistan during 2021 her murals were shortly after destroyed. She now resides in the United States and continues to paint her powerful woman figures mainly on canvas. Hassani is also currently an artist-in-residence at the UCLA Hammer Museum in Los Angeles, California.

== War, women, and burqas ==
In 2013, she told Art Radar: "I want to colour over the bad memories of war on the walls, and if I colour over these bad memories, then I erase [war] from people's minds. I want to make Afghanistan famous for its art, not its war."

Hassani mainly depicts stylized, monumental images of women wearing burqas. According to the artist, "I want to show that women have returned to Afghan society with a new, stronger shape. It's a new woman. A woman who is full of energy, who wants to start again." In an interview, Hassani explained, "I believe there are many who forget all the tragedy women face in Afghanistan; that is why I use my paintings as a means to remind the people. I want to highlight the matter in the society, with paintings reflecting women in burqas everywhere. And I try to show them bigger than what they are in reality, and in modern forms, shaped in happiness, movement, maybe stronger. I try to make people look at them differently."

The main character in Hassani's artwork is a woman who does a variety of actions to bring change in a positive way, such as playing music as a vehicle for self-expression. Hassani states to OSCE Magazine, "I want to remind people that women can play different roles and that they can be part of society." She also deliberately paints women wearing the burqa or hijab in an attempt to point out that women choosing to wear these articles is not the issue, and that women must be allowed to speak for themselves to be free.

The use of the burqa in Hassani's artwork is also an attempt to destigmatize the depictions of Muslim women, and that illustrating Muslim women removing the headscarf is not the same as liberation.

As a female street artist, Hassani is often harassed: "It is very dangerous for a girl to paint in the streets in Kabul," she says; "Sometimes people come and harass me; they don't think it is allowed in Islam for a woman to stand in the street and do graffiti." As such, Hassani states that if she feels there is any kind of danger she will leave the street, even with her painting unfinished, "For a woman, being on the street is difficult. Thirty minutes is OK, but I cannot paint good quality art in half an hour, I need at least three or four. Sometimes my friends come with me, but of course they are not able to stay the whole time. So usually I work alone. I’m always unsure about what might happen to me. Many people don’t like art; they think it is not allowed in Islam. My intuition helps me. If I feel there is some kind of danger, I leave the street, even if my piece is unfinished."

Hassani is a practicing Muslim, but she has stated that she attempts to see how she can reconcile her art with her religion — as sculptures and portraits are not allowed. She claims that when she creates sculptures dedicated to human rights that she does not perceive it as an idol, but rather an explanation to a situation that she believes others would otherwise ignore.

She states that if she creates a piece only resembling a woman, that it is a way to not go directly against her religion.

== Digital art ==
Hassani is also involved in presenting this art work in a digital format through her project titled "Dreaming Graffiti." This presentation is made in a series in which she paints or "photoshops colors and images onto digital photographs to explore issues of national and personal security".

She also used digital means to produce artwork in places she'd like to pain on, by taking photographs and 'painting' over the pictures.

== Graffiti and murals ==
- Mural painting for Once Upon a Time in Kristiansand - Norway (2025)
- Mural painting for Wide Open Walls in Sacramento, California - USA (2018)
- Mural painting for Eugene 20x21 Project in Eugene, Oregon - USA (2018)
- Graffiti for Istanbul Comic Art Festival, Istanbul - Turkey (2018)
- Participating in designing the character of Marvin the Martian - Looney Tunes (2017)
- Graffiti on the wall of Leonardo da Vinci's Institute, organized by Florence Biennale, Italy (2017)
- Mural Painting in Ventura, California - USA (2017)
- Graffiti for Art in Protest Exhibition for Human Rights Program in New York, USA 2017 (Oslo Freedom Forum)
- Attending and painting a mural at Millerntor Gallery in Germany - 2016
- Graffiti on the walls of Los Angeles, California - USA (2016)
- Participation and live graffiti at Oslo Freedom Form – Norway (2015)
- Graffiti in Art Management Workshop at Khoj - India (2013)
- Collaborating with El Mac on creating a mural in Vietnam (2012)

== Exhibitions ==
- Solo exhibition, The Dreamer, Dorothy Circus Gallery, London, United Kingdom (2025)
- Group exhibition, The Street Art of War, Rosso20Sette, Rome, Italy (2025)
- Gallery exhibition, Money Art, Galerie Sakura, Paris, France (2020)
- Group exhibition, Chahar Chob, Afghananistan Photographers Association (2019)
- Group exhibition, Traces of Words: Art and Calligraphy from Asia, Museum of Anthropology at UBC, Vancouver, Canada (2017)
- Painting exhibition at Vita Art Center, invited by ArtWalk Ventura, California - USA (2017)
- Painting exhibition at Seyhoun Art Gallery, Los Angeles, California - USA (2017)
- Painting exhibition at Elga Wimmer Gallery, organized by Roya Khadjavi in New York, USA (2017)
- Painting exhibition at Seyhoun Art Gallery, Los Angeles, California - USA (2016)
- Graffiti exhibition, conferences, and workshops organized by TERRE DES FEMMES, Switzerland (2013)
- Dreaming Graffiti exhibition in the embassies of Netherlands and Canada (2012)
- Graffiti exhibition in Australia (2012)
- Painting exhibition in the US embassy of Afghanistan (2012)

== Honors ==
- Recipient of Art Spectrum Award South Asia (Breaking New Grounds), Goa – India (2017)
- Artist in residency at Hammer Museum, UCLA – Los Angeles, United States of America (2016)
- Named one of FP's top 100 Global Thinkers (2014)
- Founder of the first National Graffiti Festival in Kabul, Afghanistan (2013)
- She was recognized as one of the BBC's 100 women of 2021.
