= Abdul Ghafoor Breshna =

Afghan historic painter

Ustad Abdul Ghafoor Breshna
- عبدالغفور برېښنا
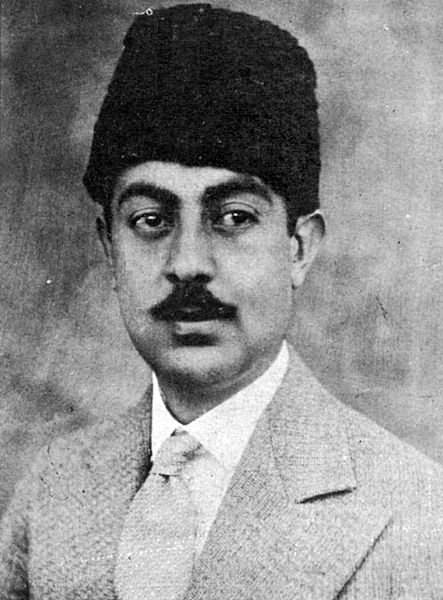
- Breshana c. 1940
- Born: Abdul Ghafoor; April 10, 1907; Kabul, Afghanistan
- Died: January 4, 1974 (aged 66); Kabul, Afghanistan
- Resting place: Kabul, Afghanistan
- Other name: Ustad Breshna
- Education: Academy of Fine Arts, Munich
- Occupations: Painter, music composer, poet, film director

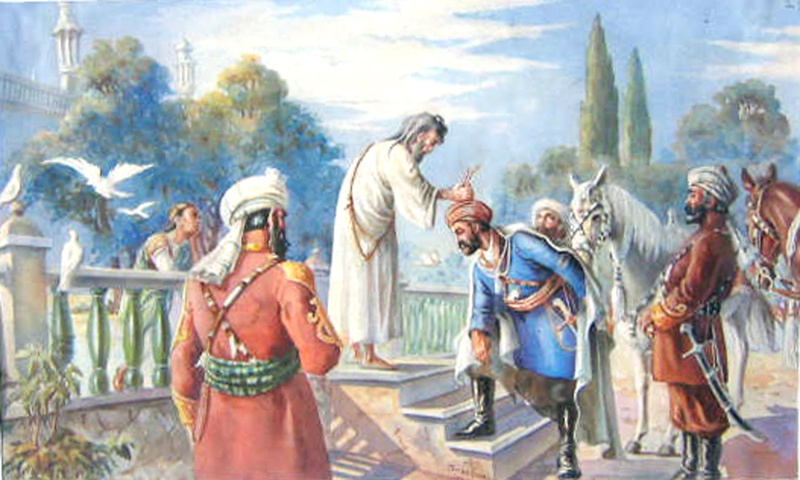
Breshna's painting of Saber Shah crowning Ahmad Shah Durrani

The former Afghan national anthem used during the 1970s, which Breshna composed

Abdul Ghafoor Breshna (Pashto: عبدالغفور بريښنا) (10 April 1907 – 4 January 1974) was an Afghan painter, music composer, poet, and film director. He is regarded as one of the country's most talented artists. He also composed the former national anthem of Afghanistan that was used during the 1970s.

== Early life and education ==
Breshana was born as Abdul Ghafoor on 10 April 1907 in Kabul, Afghanistan. The word Breshna means lightning, which he added as a last name. In 1921, he was amongst the students who were sent to Germany for higher education by Amanullah Khan. He studied painting and lithography at Academy of Fine Arts, Munich.

== Personal life ==
In Germany, Breshna married Marguerhee and returned to Afghanistan in 1931.

== Death and legacy ==
He died on 4 January 1974 in his birth city of Kabul. Most of his artwork was lost or destroyed during the many years of war in Afghanistan.

== Career ==
Breshna composed the Afghan nationalist anthem that was used from 1973 to 1978.

=== Exhibitions ===
Breshna's work was displayed in many cities around the world like Tehran (1953, 1966), Delhi (1954, 1974), Cairo (1956), New York City (1957), Moscow (1965,1973), Peking (1967), Sofia (1967), Cannes (1971) and Dushambe (1972).

== Gallery ==
Artwork by Breshna

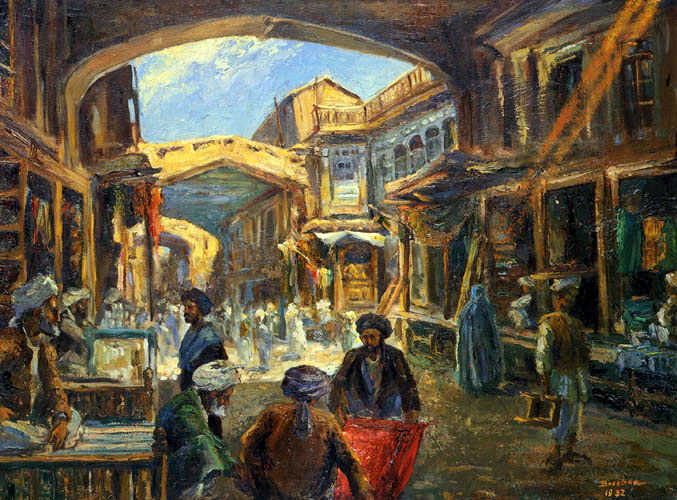
The Char Chatta Bazaar of Kabul (1932)

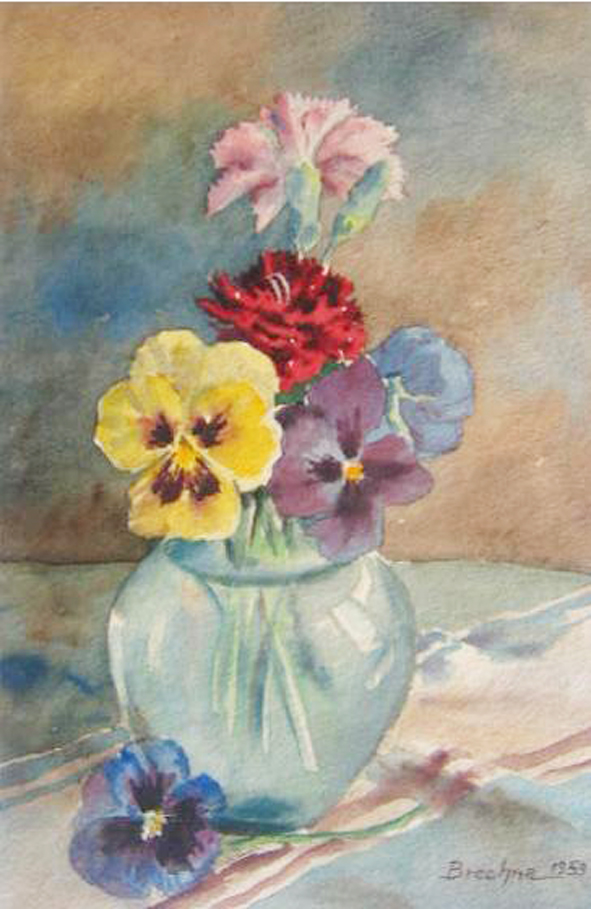
Flowers (1953, destroyed)

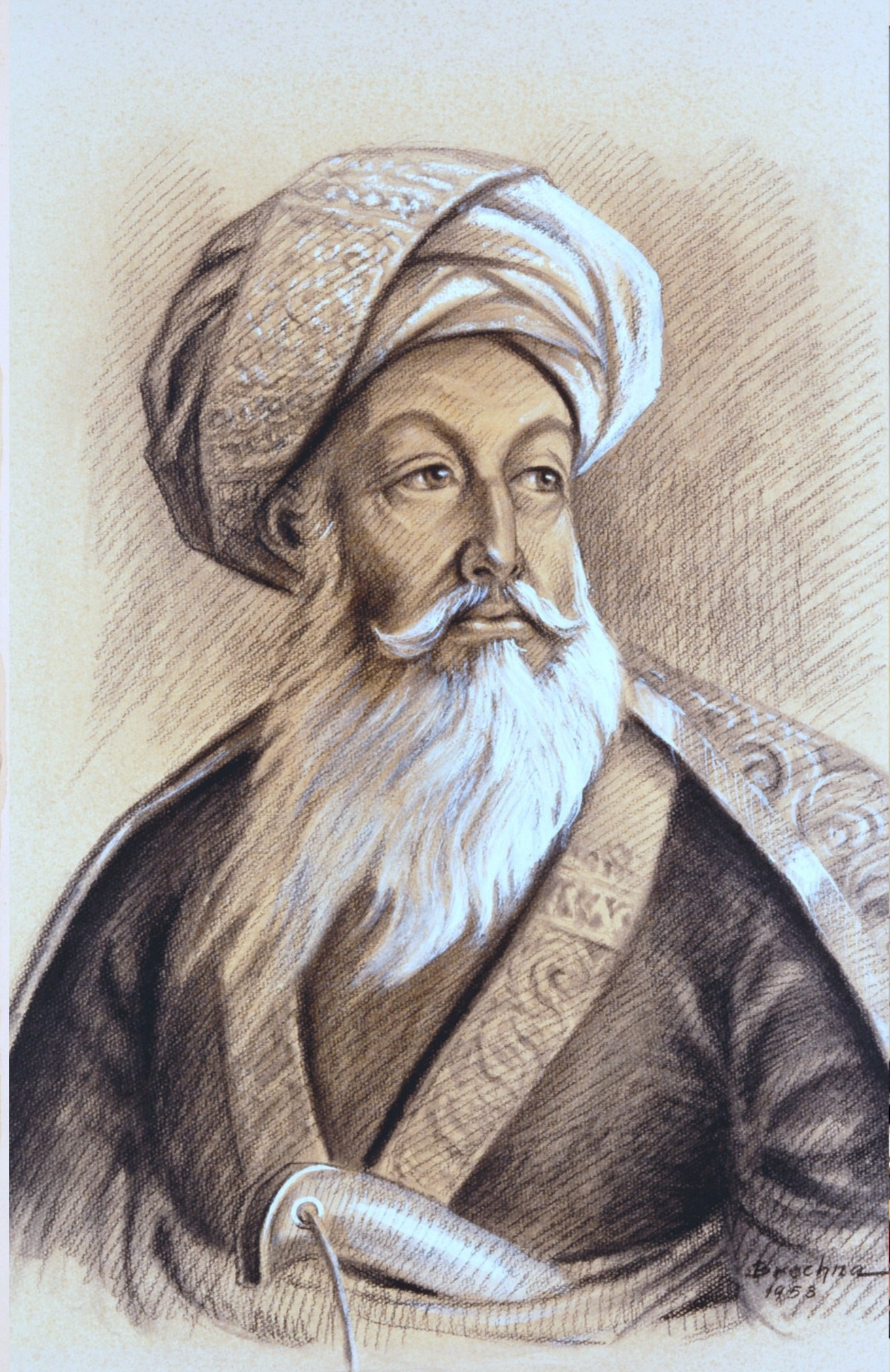
Portrait of Dost Mohammad Khan, date unknown.

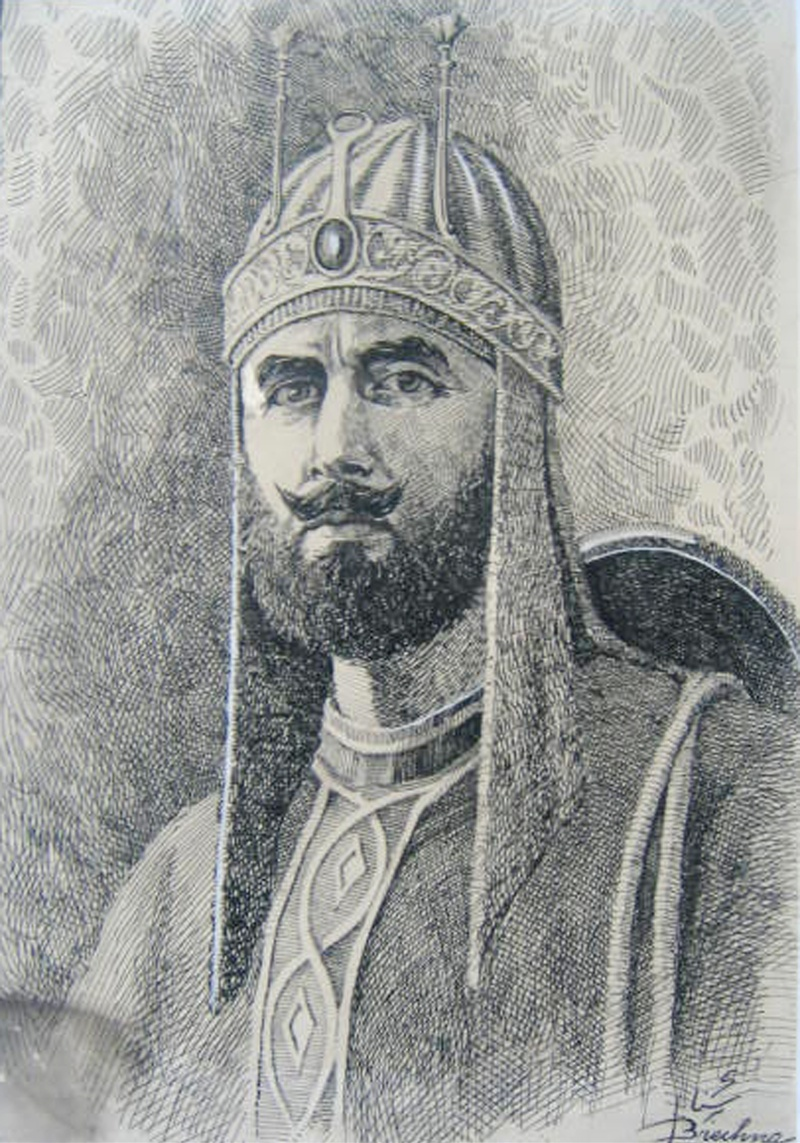
Sketch of Sher Shah Suri

== See also ==
- Kamāl ud-Dīn Behzād
- Culture of Afghanistan
