= Music of Afghanistan =

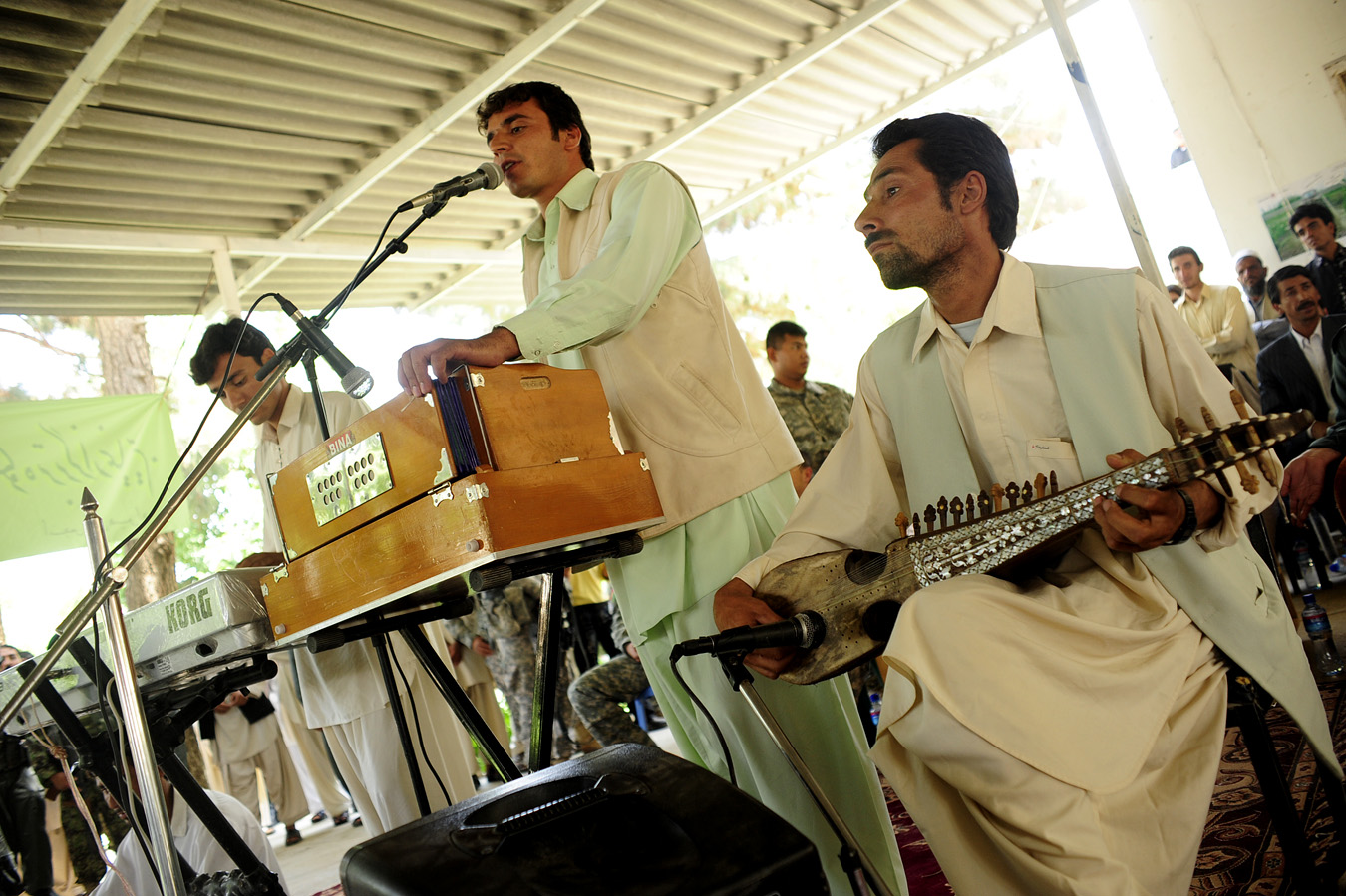
Band of Afghan musicians in Farah, Afghanistan

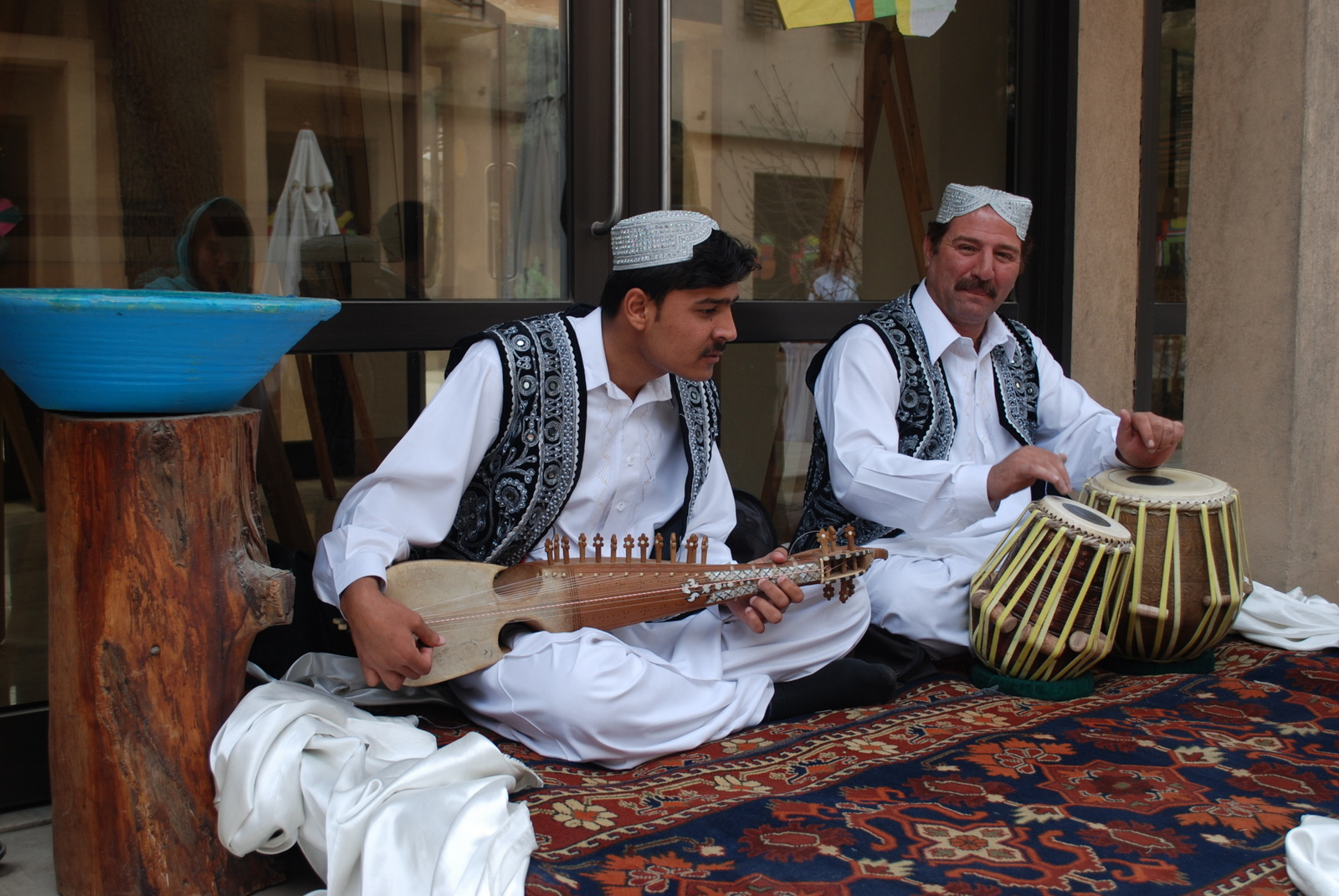
Afghan musicians with popular traditional instruments rabab and tabla

The music of Afghanistan comprises many varieties of classical music, folk music, and modern popular music. Afghanistan has a rich musical heritage and features a mix of Persian melodies, Indian compositional principles, and sounds from ethnic groups such as the Pashtuns, Tajiks and Hazaras. Instruments used range from Indian tablas to long-necked lutes. Afghanistan's classical music is closely related to Hindustani classical music while sourcing much of its lyrics directly from classical Persian poetry such as Maulana Balkhi (Rumi) and the Iranian tradition indigenous to central Asia. Lyrics throughout most of Afghanistan are typically in Dari (Persian) and Pashto. The multi-ethnic city of Kabul has long been the regional cultural capital, but outsiders have tended to focus on the city of Herat, which is home to traditions more closely related to Iranian music than in the rest of the country.

Under the rule of the Taliban, both from 1996 to 2001 and again when they took power in 2021, music has been considered prohibited.

== Current legal status ==
Since their resurgence to power on 15 August 2021, Taliban authorities in Afghanistan have implemented a strict ban on music, particularly at weddings, social gatherings, and on radio and television. Additionally, there have been reports of Taliban forces destroying musical instruments, such as an incident involving the burning of instruments in late July 2023 in Herat Province.

== Folk and traditional music ==
=== Religious music ===
The Afghan concept of music is closely associated with instruments, and thus unaccompanied religious singing is not considered music. Koran recitation is an important kind of unaccompanied religious performance, as is the ecstatic Zikr ritual of the Sufis which uses songs called na't, and the Shi'a solo and group singing styles like mursia, manqasat, nowheh and rowzeh. The Chishti Sufi sect of Kabul is an exception in that they use instruments like the rubab, tabla also harmonium in their worship; this music is called tatti ("food for the soul").

=== Patriotic music ===
Many patriotic songs have been made for Afghanistan. One of the best known songs is "Da Zamong Zeba Watan" ("This is our beautiful homeland" in Pashto) by Ustad Awalmir, sung sometime in the 1970s. Another popular song is "Watan" ("Homeland") by Abdul Wahab Madadi, in Persian. Recorded in 1980, the song samples a Greek song called "Antonis" composed by Mikis Theodorakis. The first line, Watan ishq tu iftikhar, translates to "My country, my love for you is my honour". Its tone sounds very similar to a national anthem.

== Classical ==
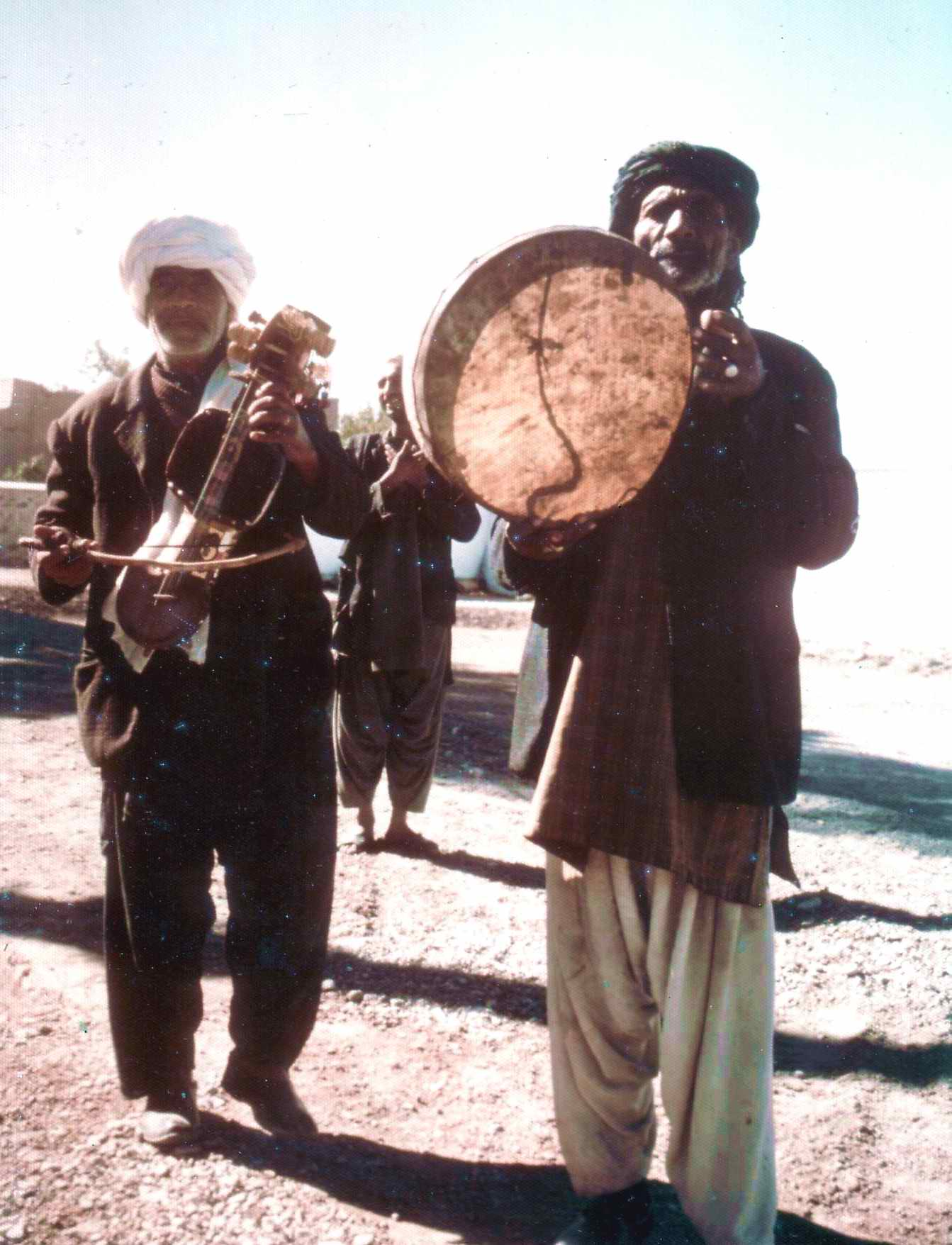
Minstrels, Herat, 1973

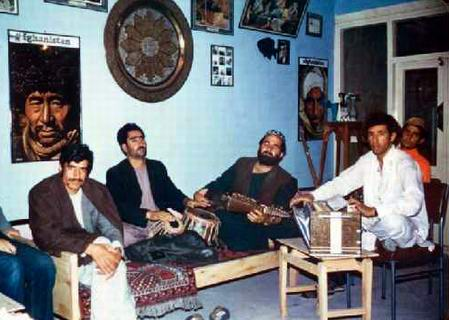
Musicians, Herat 1973

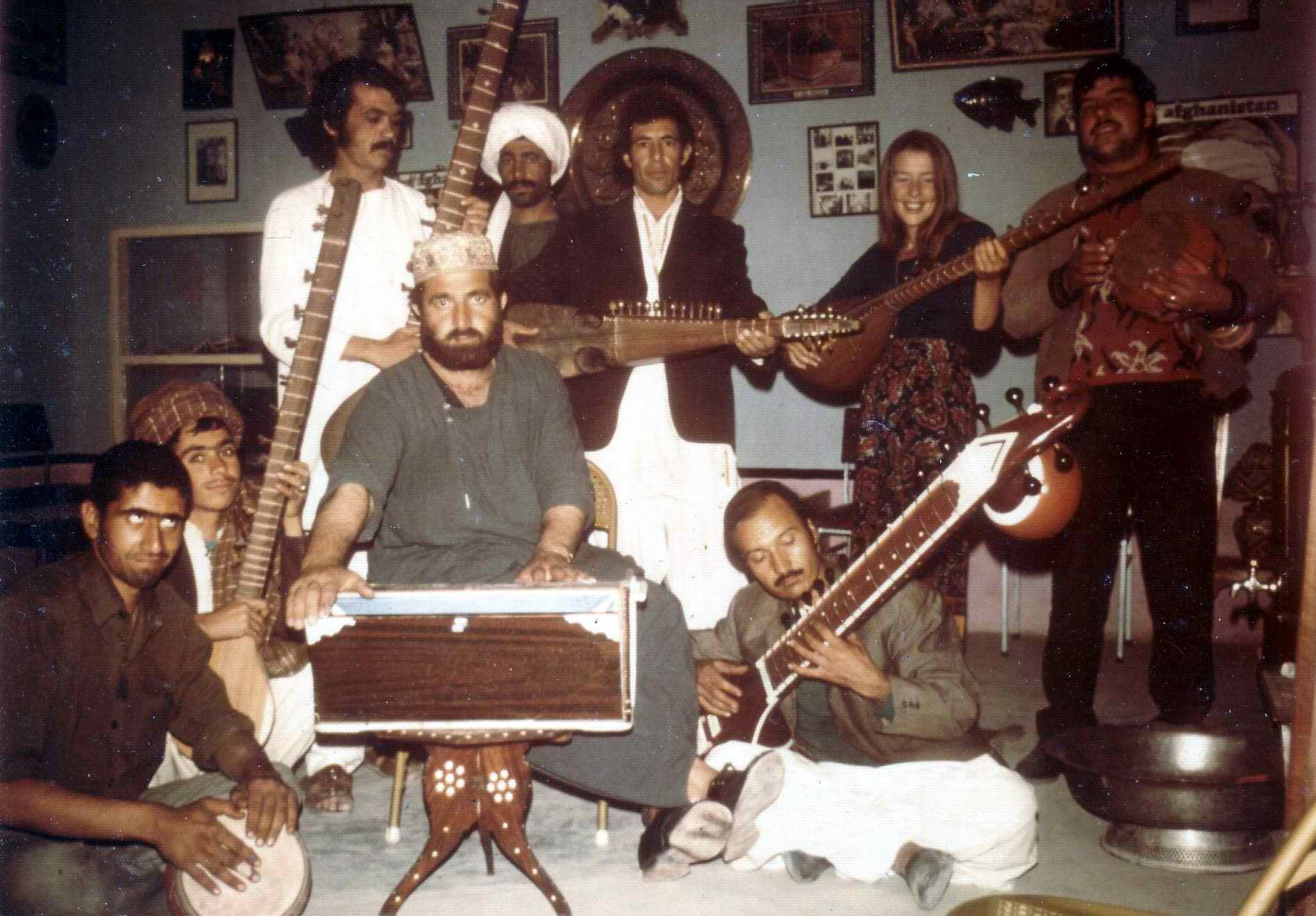
Musicians in Herat, Afghanistan in 1973

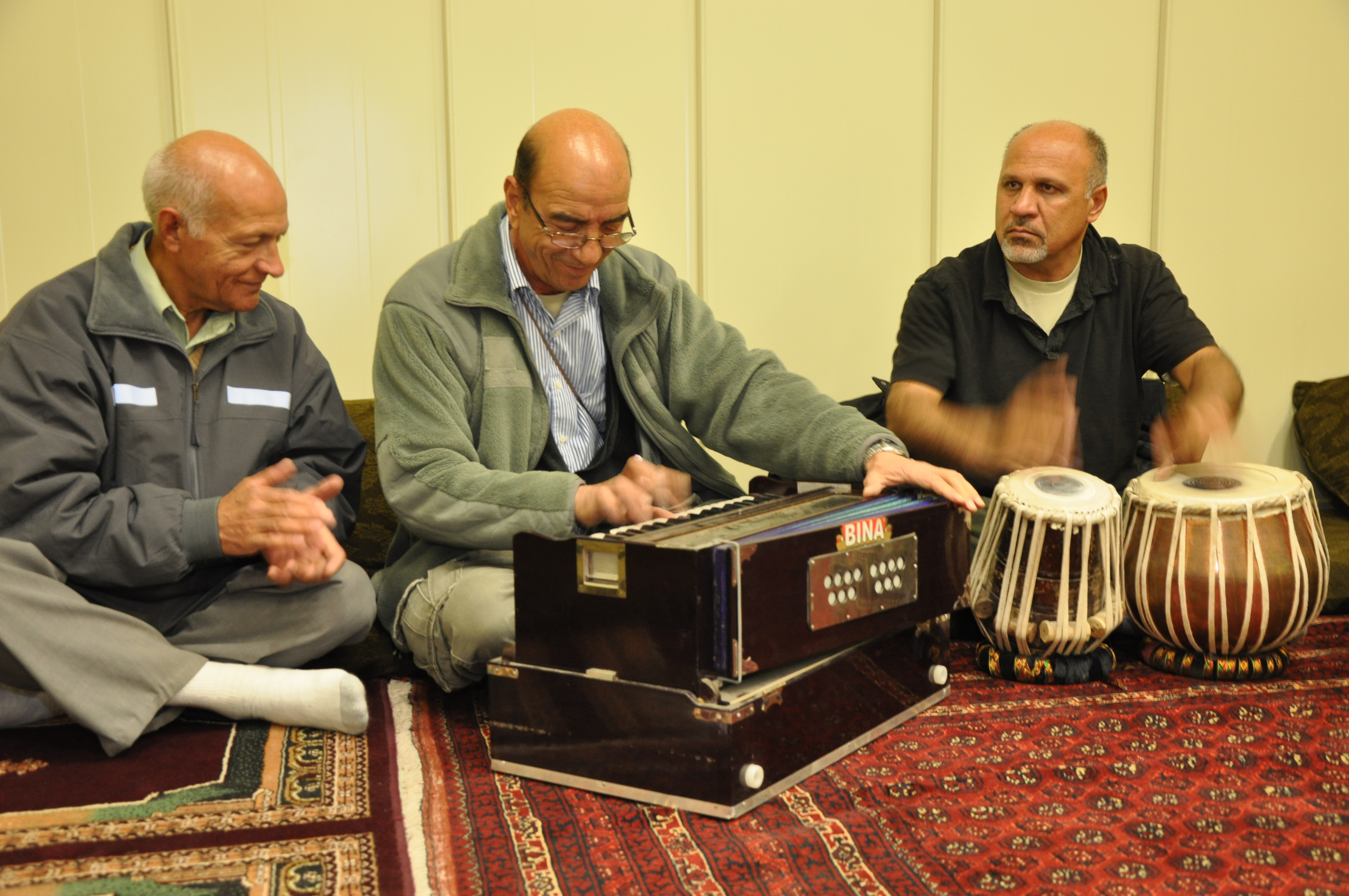
Afghan men performing at the new Afghan Cultural Center on Camp Leatherneck in Helmand Province

There is no single tradition, but many musical traditions and styles in Afghanistan. These different traditions and styles evolved over centuries in the context of a society with highly diverse ethnic, linguistic, regional, religious, and class distinctions. Afghan music can be classified in a number of ways. Although it is common practice to classify Afghan music along linguistic and regional lines (i.e. Pashto, Persian, Logari, Shomali, etc.), a more technically appropriate classification would be to distinguish various forms of Afghan music purely by their musical style. Thus, Afghan music can be mainly divided into four categories: Indian classical, Mohali (folk and regional styles), Western, and another style unique to Afghanistan simply called Afghan music.

The Indian classical tradition was a hugely influential strain. The vast majority of the elite artists in Afghanistan until the 1980s were trained in the Indian classical tradition. Ustad Sarahang, Rahim Bakhsh, Ustad Nashenas and many other singers were prominent adherents of this style. This style emphasized compositions in the Indian raga style and the singing of Ghazals in melodies very similar to Indian classical and court music. The classical musical form of Afghanistan is called klasik, which includes both instrumental and vocal and belly dancing ragas, as well as Tarana and Ghazals. Many Ustads, or professional musicians, have learned North Indian classical music in India, and some of them were Indian descendants who moved from India to the royal court in Kabul in the 1860s. They maintain cultural and personal ties with India—through discipleship or intermarriage—and they use the Hindustani musical theories and terminology, for example raga (melodic form) and tala (rhythmic cycle). Afghanistan's classical singers include the late Ustad Mohammad Hussain Sarahang (1924–1983), who is one of the master singers of Patiala Gharana in North Indian classical music and is also well known throughout India and Pakistan as a contemporary of Ustad Bade Ghulam Ali Khan. His composition "Pai Ashk" was used in the theme song of the Hindi film Mera Saya. Ubaidullah Jan Kandahari is regarded as the king of Pashto music in the southern Afghanistan region. He died in the 1980s but his music is still enjoyed by the Pashtun diaspora around the world, mainly by the Pashtuns in the Kandahar-Quetta regions. Other classical singers are Ustad Qasim, Ustad Rahim Bakhsh, and Ustad Nato.

The second group, Mohali (folk) music was more diverse. It contained various folkloric and regional styles which had evolved indigenously without outside influence. These styles include Qataghani, Logari, Qarsak etc. which are specific to a region & linguistic group in Afghanistan. Some prominent artists in this category were Hamahang, Beltoon etc. Many other singers, however, who do not belong to this genre, have dabbled in recording songs in the Qataghani, logari, qarsak etc. styles. Each of these forms had its own scale (they did not use the classical Indian raga scale, nor did they use the western major/minor scale) and mainly consisted of well known songs whose composition and lyrics had evolved organically over centuries. The lyrics, though deep, were often simple and lacked the poetic sophistication of the great Persian & Pashto poetic traditions.

The most popular musical traditions in Afghanistan is the pure Afghan musical style. The pure Afghan musical style was popularized by the Afghan singer Ahmad Zahir. The style borrows from many other musical traditions such as the Indian, Iranian, Middle Eastern, and folkloric Afghan traditions, but it fuses these styles into a sound that is unique to Afghanistan and suits the lyrical, poetic, rhythmic, and orchestral tastes of both afghan Dari and afghan Pashto speakers. Apart from Ahmad Zahir, the most successful contemporary proponent of this style of Farhad Darya. However, the progenitor of this musical tradition was another Afghan singer named Abdul Rahim Sarban. Sarban songs set the template for the unique Persian-language Afghan musical sound that characterizes the most popular Afghan musical genre today. Sarban chose poetry from the great classical Persian/Dari poets and set them to compositions which incorporated elements of Western jazz and belle chanson with the mohali (regional) traditions of Afghanistan. Up until then, Afghanistan had been mainly a borrower of styles from Iran, India and other countries. With Sarbanes arrival, Afghan music reached such a height that renowned artists from major cultural centres such as Iran borrowed his songs and covered them for their audiences (for instance Iran's singer Googoosh covered a number of Sarban songs, most famously his "Ay Sarban Ahesta Ran").

Sarban's musical style was effectively adopted by Ahmad Zahir, Ahmad Wali, Nashenas, Afsana, Seems Tarana, Jawad Ghaziyar, Farhad Darya, and numerous other Afghan singers, and transformed into a genuine recognizable Afghan musical style.

This form, Western music (mainly consisting of pop, and nowadays rap), is influenced mainly by the Western musical tradition. However, in spite of its modernity, it is not the most popular musical genre. Many singers including Ahmad Zahir have sung in this tradition (pop, rock n roll, etc.). Most recently, there has been a blooming of the rap and hip hop scene in Afghanistan as well. However, the Western musical influence on Afghan music continues to be only in the fields of instrumentation and orchestration; Afghan musicians tend to choose musical languages and compositions which belong to indigenous Afghan musical forms, but they use Western musical instruments (such as drums, percussions and guitars) to orchestrate their music. There are a few musicians who compose in the Western musical tradition as well.

=== Rubab ===
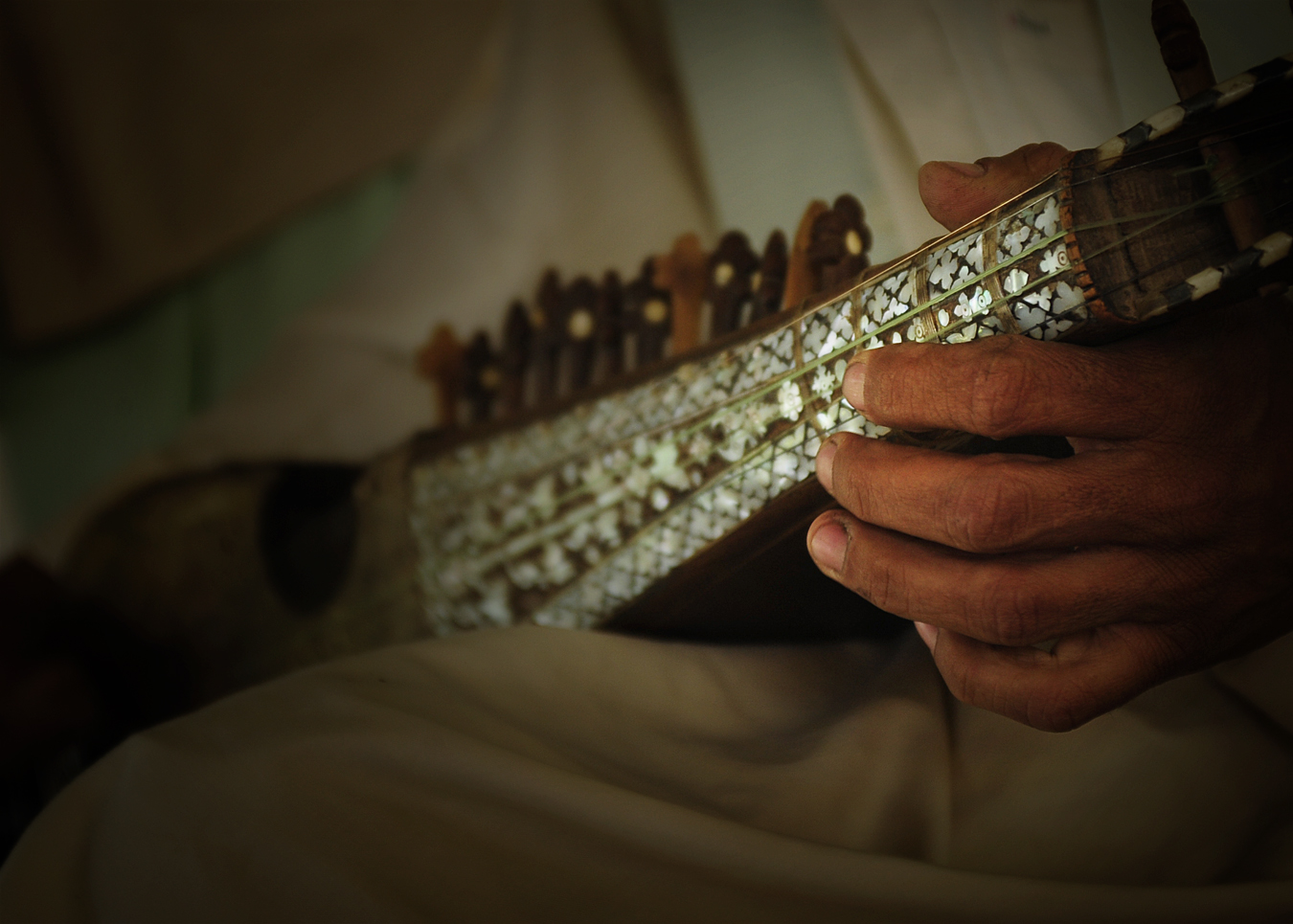
Afghanistan's rubab

The rubab is a common lute-like instrument in Afghanistan, and is a forerunner of the Indian sarod. The rubab is sometimes considered the national instrument of Afghanistan, and is called the "lion of instruments"; one reviewer claims it sounds like "a Middle Eastern predecessor to the blues that popped up in the Piedmont 100 years ago". The rubab has a double-chambered body carved from mulberry wood, which is chosen to give the instrument its distinct timbre. It has three main strings and a plectrum made from ivory, bone or wood.

Famous players of the rubab are Mohammad Omar, Essa Kassemi, Homayun Sakhi, and Mohammed Rahim Khushnawaz.

=== Dombura ===
The dombura, dambora or dambora is a popular folk instrument among Hazaras, Uzbeks, Turkmens and Tajiks. Notable dombura players in Afghanistan include Dilagha Surood, Naseer Parwani, Dawood Sarkhosh, Mir Maftoon and Safdar Tawakoli. The dombura is played with much banging and scratching on the instrument to help give a percussive sound. The two strings are made of nylon (in modern times) or gut. They cross a short bridge to a pin at the other end of the body. There is a tiny sound hole in the back of the instrument, while the top is thick wood. It is not finished with any varnish, filing or sanding of any kind, and as with all other Afghanistan instruments there is some decoration.

=== Ghichak ===
Ghichak is a string instrument made by the Hazaras and Tajiks of Afghanistan.

=== List of Ustads ===
The following is an incomplete list of classical Afghan musicians who have been honored as an ustad:

- Awalmir
- Mohammad Hussain Sarahang
- Rahim Bakhsh
- Mahwash
- Nainawaz
- Jalil Zaland
- Amani
- Nato
- Abdul Rahim Sarban
- Ulfat Ahang
- Mohammad Omar
- Beltoon
- Shah Wali Taranasaz
- Nashenas
- Ghulam Dastagir Shaida
- Hafizullah Khyal
- Gul Zaman
- ShadKam
- Arman

== Pop music ==
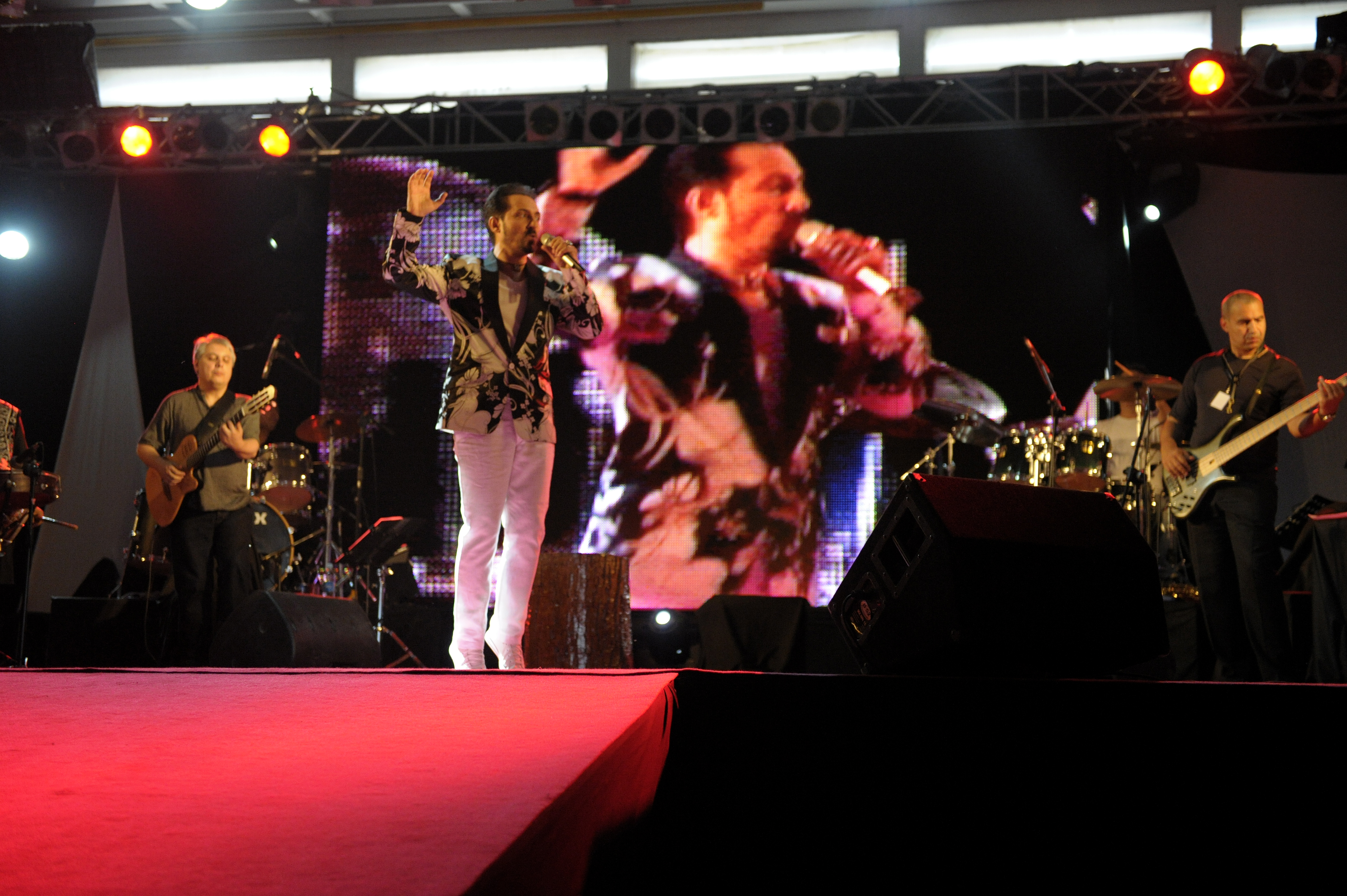
Farhad Darya performing at a concert in Kabul, Afghanistan.

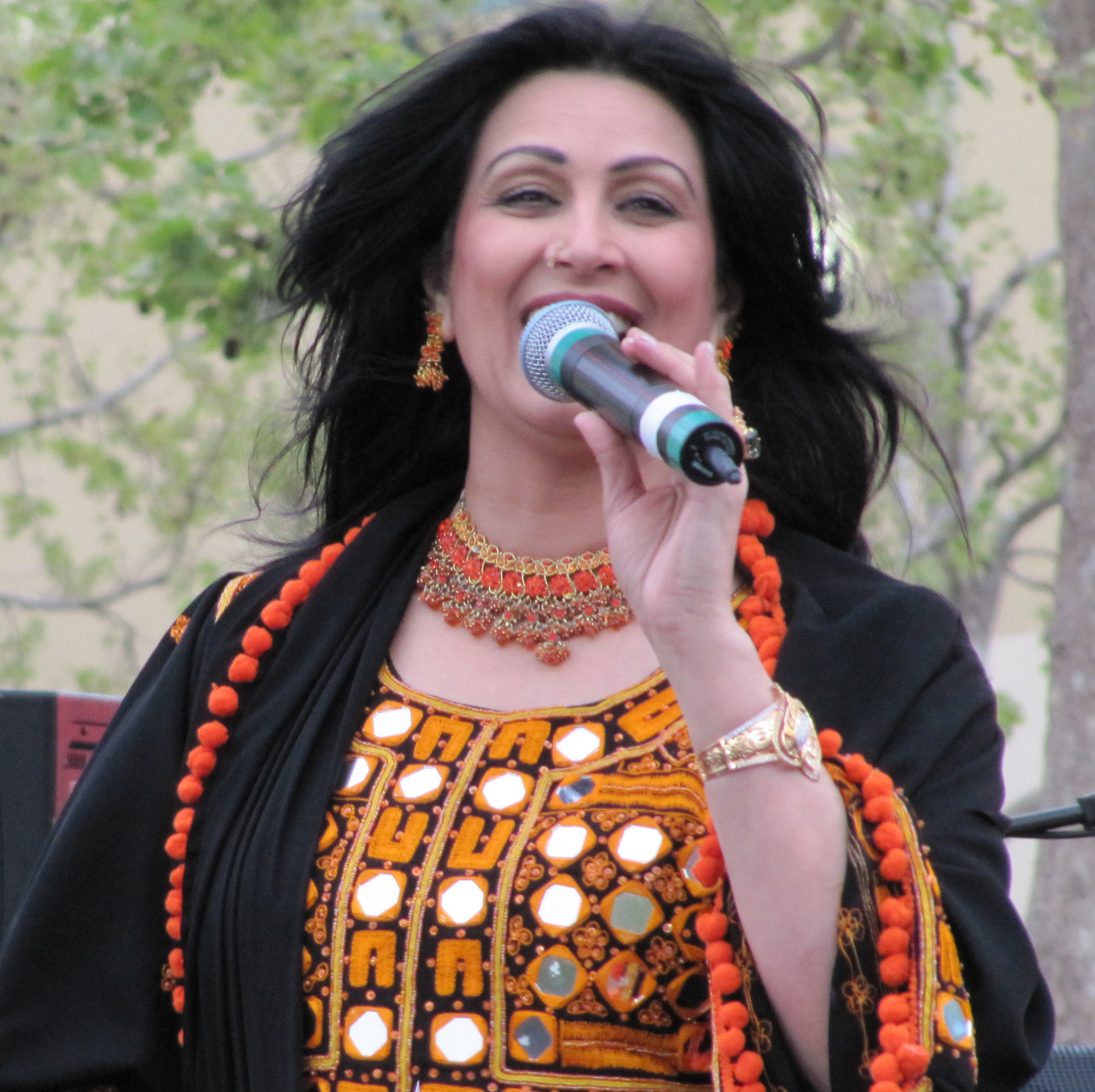
Naghma

In 1925, Afghanistan began radio broadcasting, but its station was destroyed in 1929. Broadcasting did not resume until Radio Kabul opened in 1940. As Radio Afghanistan reached the entire country, popular music grew more important.

Modern popular music did not arise until the 1950s when radio became commonplace in the country. They used orchestras featuring both Afghan and Indian instruments, as well as European clarinets, guitars and violins. The 1970s were the golden age of Afghanistan's music industry. Popular music also included Indian and Pakistani cinema film and music imported from Iran, Tajikistan, the Arab world and elsewhere.

In 1951, Mermon Parwin became the first Afghan woman to sing live on the radio. Farida Mahwash, one of the famous female singers who then gained the title of Ustad (Master), had a major hit with "O bacheh" in 1977; she was "perhaps the most notable" of pop singers. Rukhshana was another early female singer who had achieved high fame during the 1960s.

=== History of pop ===
Pop music emerged in Afghanistan during the 1950s, and became very popular until the late 1970s. What helped the emergence of pop music in Afghanistan were amateur singers from non-traditional music backgrounds who wanted to showcase their talents in the studio Radio Kabul. These singers were from middle- to upper-class families and were more educated than singers from traditional music backgrounds.

These amateurs innovated in Afghan music and created a more modern approach to the traditional folklore and classical music of Afghans. Amateur singers included Farhad Darya, Ahmad Zahir, Ustad Davood Vaziri, Nashenas (Dr. Sadiq Fitrat), Ahmad Wali, Zahir Howaida, Rahim Mehryar, Mahwash, Haidar Salim, Ehsan Aman, Hangama, Parasto, Naghma, Mangal, Sarban, Qamar Gula and others. Ahmad Zahir was among Afghanistan's most famous singers; throughout the 60s and 70s he gained national and international recognition in countries like Iran and Tajikistan.

The couple Farid Rastagar and Wajiha Rastagar pioneered Afghan synthpop. They as well as Farhad Darya helped to establish new wave during the 1980s.

During the 1990s, the Afghan Civil War caused many musicians to flee, and subsequently the Taliban government banned instrumental music and much public music-making. Taliban's punishments of being caught playing music or being caught with cassettes ranged from confiscation and a warning to severe beatings and imprisonment. Many people continued to secretly play their instruments. Exiled musicians from the famous Kharabat district of Kabul set up business premises in Peshawar, Pakistan, where they continued their musical activities. Much of the Afghan music industry was preserved via circulation in Peshawar and the holding of concerts for Afghan performers there helped to keep the industry alive.

After the 2001 US intervention in Afghanistan and the removal of the Taliban, the music scene began to re-emerge. Some groups, like the Kaboul Ensemble, gained an international reputation. In addition, traditional Pashtun music (especially in the southeast of the country) entered a period of "golden years", according to a prominent spokesman for Afghan Ministry of Interior, Lutfullah Mashal.

Rock music slowly gained a foothold in the country. Kabul Dreams is one of the few Afghan rock bands; formed in 2008 by ex-pats, they claim to be the first one. However it was popularised in the mainstream by Farhad Darya who experimented with rock alongside his usual pop hits. Additionally, singing competition television series such as Afghan Star and The Voice of Afghanistan became popular, with singing contestants performing songs, including those formerly banned.

Metal music was represented by District Unknown, who as a band no longer exist and have moved to various parts of the world, from the United Kingdom to the US. They were documented in the rockumentary Rockabul, filmed by Australian Travis Beard.

== Hip-hop and rap ==
Afghan hip-hop is a type of music popular among Afghanistan's youth and immigrant community. It inherits much of the style of traditional hip hop, but puts added emphasis on rare cultural sounds. Afghan hip hop is mostly sung in Dari (Persian), Pashto, and English. One popular hip hop artist is DJ Besho (Bezhan Zafarmal), a resident of Kabul. Another is 'Awesome Qasim', who is known in Canada and raps in Persian, Pashto, and English. Qasim's most recent album came out in February 2013 in Canada. Kabul musician Soosan Firooz has been described as Afghanistan's first female rapper. Sonita Alizadeh is another female Afghan rapper, who has gained notoriety for writing music protesting forced marriages. The country's rapping scene has become increasingly prevalent in recent years. In 2017, Sayed Jamal Mubarez became the first rapper to win the annual Afghan Star musical competition. In 2022, an Afghan rap song by Jawad13 and MiSAQ were commissioned by and available on Facebook Sound library.

== See also ==
- Afghanistan National Institute of Music
- List of Afghan singers
- List of Pashto-language singers
