= Ustad Qasim =

Afghan musician

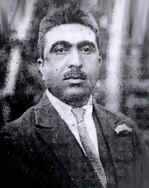

Background information
- Also known as: Qasimjo; Ustad Muhammad Qasim; Kassim Afghan
- Born: Qasem Jo; 1878; Kabul, Afghanistan
- Died: 1957 (aged 78–79)
- Occupations: Musician; composer; singer

Qasem Jo (Pashto: قاسم جو; 1878–1957), better known as Ustad Qasim (استاد قاسم), was an Afghan musician, composer, and singer. He is generally considered by musicologists to be one of the most well-known Afghan musicians of the 20th century.

== Early life and education ==
Qasim was of Kashmiri descent and was born as Qasem Jo in the Gozar Barana district of the Afghan capital city of Kabul during the late 1870s. He descended from a musical lineage, as his father, Sitar Jo, was both a musician and a nawab (viceroy). Upon a friend's invitation, Qasim's father immigrated from his native Kashmir to Afghanistan to provide his musical services to the country's monarchy, and it is here where Qasim was born.

Qasim attended a madrasa, an Arabic educational institution, which specialized solely in religious studies; as such, he learned music theory from his father. He also learned to play such musical instruments such as the sitar and the tabla, as well as a number of languages, including persian from his mother, Pashto, Urdu, and Arabic from his religious school. At the same time, his geographical proximity to Barana, a famous musical quarter of Kharabat, contributed to his development as a musician.

== Career ==
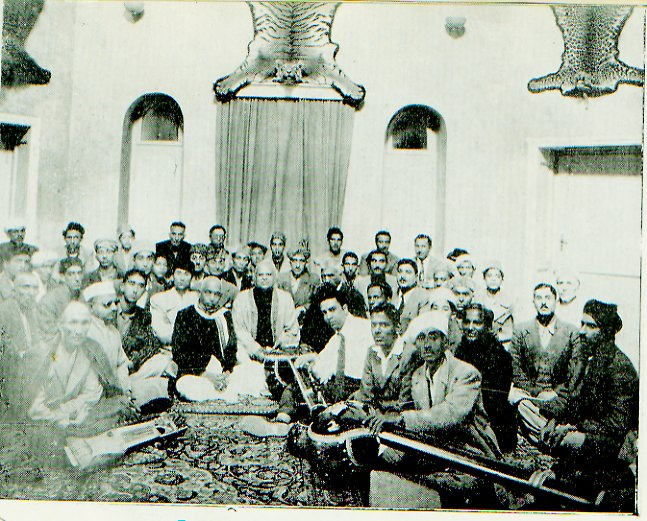
Qasim performing at a British embassy, ca. 1917

"Millī Surūd"
The former national anthem of Afghanistan, used from 1992 to 2006, which Qasim composed in 1919.

Qasim developed his own musical style, as required by the Afghan court, from the symbiosis between classical Indian music and Afghan folklore. He primarily sang composed songs in Dari, the official court language of both the Iranian plateau and northern India, but also wrote and performed songs in Urdu, Hindi, and Pashto.

During Qasim's life, Afghanistan was ruled by a monarchy. From the age of 20 onward, Qasim provided his musical services to various Afghan sovereigns, including Emir Abdur Rahman Khan, who was known as the "Bismarck of Afghanistan" and who made him the court's royal singer. This promotion is said to have consisted of a rubab and 200 Afghanis, known at the time as rupees. As such, Qasim performed in a British embassy in 1917. Music composed by Qasim in 1919 was used in a Mujahideen battle song and, in turn, as the national anthem of Afghanistan from 1992 to 2006.

Qasim reached the high point of his career during the administration of Emir Habibullah Khan. The reform king continued to support Qasim's music, even after his father's murder. Qasim opened a music school and, as a result of his talents, received the title of "Ustad" (master) from Habibullah Khan. His popularity increased even further as radio broadcasting came to Kabul. Amanullah Khan was allegedly so enthralled by Qasim's voice and his songs that he even had Qasim's records played on gramophones during state visits in Asia and Europe.

== Credits ==
Qasim often used the stage name Kassim Afghan (قاسم افغان) as well as other pseudonyms using the word Afghan, in order to pay tribute to the land in which he was born. Due to his popularity and influence, Qasim eventually became known as the "father of Afghan music" and the "founder of classical Afghan music". He was also a leader of Kharabat and both Qasim and his students contributed significantly to music and the construction of musical instruments in Afghanistan, especially for the rehabilitation of musicians and artists who were still occasionally suffering discrimination by music-averse rulers in Afghanistan, such as in the times of Taliban rule, among others.

Qasim influenced many Afghan musicians, such as Rahim Bakhsh and Mohammad Omar. Many of his direct descendants also carried on his musical legacy, becoming musicians like him.

The most famous first- and second-generation students of Qasim include:

- Ustad Natu (singer)
- Ustad Saber
- Ustad Rahim Baksh (singer)
- Ustad Nabigul
- Ustad Mohammad Omar (rubab player)
- Ustad Nazar (dilruba player)

Further prominent descendants and students of his include Ustad Yaqob Qasimi, Esa Qasimi, Yusuf Qasimi, Asef Qasimi, Musa Qasimi, Ustad Breshna, Zahir Howaida, and Nashenas.

== Awards in Afghanistan ==
- Award of an ivory rubab
- The title of Ustad
- Medal for music by the independent concerto
- Title of "Star of the East"
- Man of the Year in 1929
- A gift of 20 hectares of land from Mohammed Nadir Shah
- Gold medal and a new Chrevolet
- A bust of Ustad Qasim in front of the station headquarters of Radio Kabul
- After his death, a gravestone in the capital city of Kabul

== Notes ==
1. The Art of Afghan Music: Ustād Mahwash, Vocals at asia.si.edu, accessed on November 20, 2020.

== See also ==
- Afghan music
- Indian music
