= Ghulam Dastagir Shaida =

Afghan singer and musician

Ustad Ghulam Dastagir Shaida استاد غلام دستگیر شیدا
- Ustad Shaida

Background information
- Born: Ghulam Dastagir; 1916
- Origin: Kabul, Afghanistan
- Died: 1970 (aged 53–54)
- Genres: Khayal, Thumri, Tarana, Ghazal Classic
- Occupation: Vocalist
- Years active: 1948–1970

Ghulam Dastagir Shaida (استاد غلام دستگیر شیدا) (1916–1970) was an Afghan singer and musician. Shaida was born in the Kharabat neighborhood of Kabul, home of Kabul musicians who sung in classical Indian tradition. Shaida is considered as one of the great Ustads of Afghan classical music along with Sarahang and Rahim Bakhsh. His unique voice and style of singing resulted in fellow Kharabat musicians bestowing upon him the title of Shaida, which in Sufi tradition means one who has sacrificed himself for divine love.

His father Haji Afzal was a musician as well and played the Rubab, he also traveled quite often to India for business. During one of these trips he enrolled young Shaida to take lessons from Ustad Ghulam Hossein. Shaida traveled back to India in 1948 and begun taking lessons from Ustad Abdul Wahab Khan.

After Shaida's return from India and his popularity amongst musicians and public, he was awarded the title of "Ustad" (maestro) from Ministry of culture. Also in 1964 the Minister of Press and Information Sayed Qassem Rishtya awarded him a "Medal of Art".

Ustad Shaida died of his injuries after a car accident in the outskirts of Kabul, 22 April 1970. He was buried in Kabul.
