= Abdul-Qādir Bēdil =

Indo-Persian sufi, writer and poet (1642–1720)

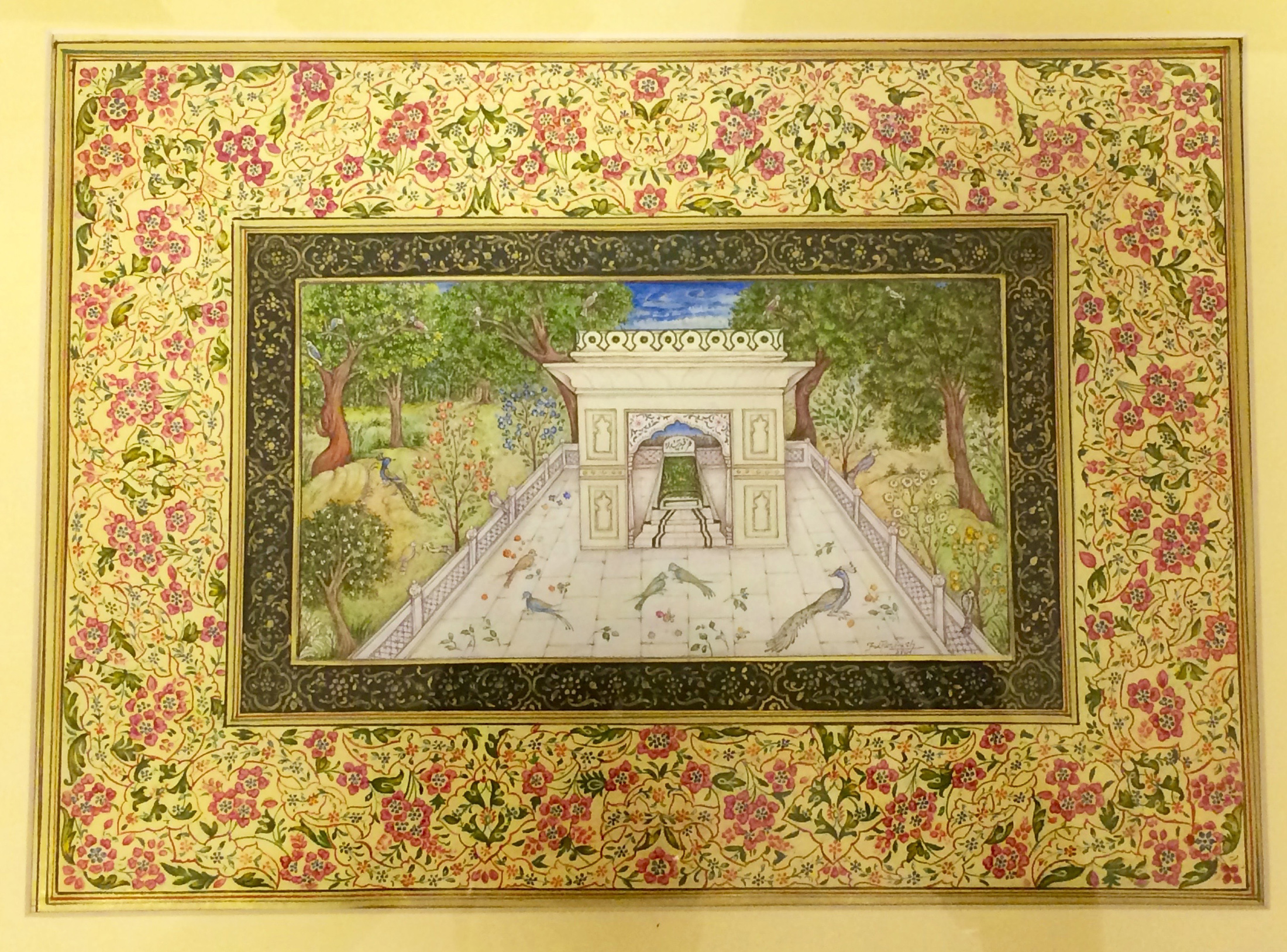
- Miniature painting of the tomb of Abdul-Qādir Bēdil
- Born: 1642; Patna, Bihar Subah, Mughal Empire
- Died: 1720; Delhi, Mughal Empire
- Resting place: Delhi, India
- Occupations: Poet and mystic

Abul-Ma'ānī Mīrzā 'Abdul-Qādir Bēdil (Persian: مولانا ابوالمعانی میرزا عبدالقادر بیدل), or Bēdil (Persian: بیدل, romanized: Bēdil), also known as Bēdil Dehlavī (Persian: بیدل دهلوی, romanized: Bēdil Dihlawī; 1642–1720) and Bēdil 'Aẓīmābādī (Persian: بیدل عظیم‌آبادی, romanized: Bēdil 'Aẓīm-ābādī, was an Indian Sufi, and considered one of the greatest Indo-Persian poets, next to Amir Khusrau, who lived most of his life during the reign of Aurangzeb, the sixth Mughal emperor. He was the foremost representative of the later phase of the Indian style of Persian poetry, and the most difficult and challenging poet of that school.

== Life ==
Bēdil was born in Azimabad (present-day Patna) in India to Mirza 'Abd al-Khaliq (d. 1648), a former Turkic soldier who belonged to the Barlas tribe of the Chagatai Turk. The descendants of the family had originally lived in the city of Balkh, before moving to India. Bēdil's native language was Chagatai Turki but he also spoke Hindustani (i.e., Hindi-Urdu; then known as Rekhta), Sanskrit and Turkic, as well as Persian and Arabic, which he learned in elementary school.

Bēdil mostly wrote ghazal and ruba'is (quatrains) in Persian (the language of the royal court), which he had learned during his childhood. He was the author of 16 books of poetry, which contained nearly 147,000 verses and included several masnavi in that language. He is considered one of the prominent poets of Indian School of Poetry in Persian literature, and is regraded as having his own unique style. Both Mirza Ghalib and Muhammad Iqbal were influenced by him. His books include Ṭilism-i Ḥayrat (طلسم حيرت), Ṭūr-i Ma'rifat (طور معرفت), Čahār 'Unṣur (چهار عنصر) and Ruqa'āt (رقعات).

Possibly as a result of being brought up in such a mixed religious environment, Bēdil had considerably more tolerant views than his poetic contemporaries. He preferred freethought to accepting the established beliefs of his time, siding with the common people and rejecting the clergy who he often saw as corrupt.

Bēdil's work is highly regarded in Afghanistan, Tajikistan, Pakistan and India. Bēdil came back to prominence in Iran in 1980s. Literary critics Mohammad-Reza Shafiei Kadkani and Mohammad Shams Langeroodi were instrumental in Bēdil's re-emergence in Iran. Iran also sponsored two international conferences on Bēdil.

The Indian school of Persian poetry, especially Bēdil's poetry, is criticised for its complex and implicit meanings. As a result, it is better regarded in Afghanistan, Tajikistan, Pakistan and India than in Iran. In Afghanistan, a unique school in poetry studying is dedicated to Bēdil's poetry called Bēdilšināsī (lit. 'Bēdil studies'), and those who have studied his poetry are called Bēdilšinās (lit. 'Bēdil experts'). His poetry plays a major role in Indo-Persian classical music in central Asia. Many Afghan classical musicians (e.g. Mohammad Hussain Sarahang and Nashenas) have sung Bēdil's ghazals.

== Grave ==
His grave, called Bāġ-i Bēdil (lit. 'Garden of Bēdil') is situated across Purana Qila, at Mathura Road next to the Major Dhyan Chand National Stadium gates and the pedestrian bridge over Mathura Road in Delhi.

== Works ==
- Bıdil, ‘Abd al-Qadir. Avaz-ha-yi Bidil: Nasri adabi (Ruq‘at - Nukat – Isharat – Chahar - ‘Unsur). Edited by Akbar Bihdarvand. Tehran: Nigah, 1386 [2007].
- Bıdil, ‘Abd al-Qadir. Kullıyat. Lucknow: Naval Kishor, 1287 [1870 or 1871].
- Bıdil, ‘Abd al-Qadir. Ghazaliyati Bidil Dihlavi. Edited by Akbar Bihdavand. Shiraz: Navid-i Shiraz, 1387 [2008 or 2009].

== Bibliography ==
- Ahmad, Mohamad Bohari Haji. "The Ideas of Wahdat Al-Wujud in the Poetry of'Abd Al-Qadir Bidil (Persian), Ibrahim Hakki Erzurumlu (Ottoman Turkish), and Hamzah Fansuri (Malay)." PhD diss., 1990.
- Chopra, R. M. "Great Poets of Classical Persian", Sparrow Publication, Kolkata, 2014, (ISBN 978-81-89140-75-5)
- Erkinov A. "Manuscripts of the works by classical Persian authors (Hāfiz, Jāmī, Bīdil): Quantitative Analysis of 17th-19th c. Central Asian Copies". Iran: Questions et connaissances. Actes du IVe Congrès Européen des études iraniennes organisé par la Societas Iranologica Europaea, Paris, 6-10 Septembre 1999. vol. II: Périodes médiévale et moderne. [Cahiers de Studia Iranica. 26], M.Szuppe (ed.). Association pour l'avancement des études iraniennes-Peeters Press. Paris-Leiden, 2002, pp. 213–228.
- Faruqi, Shamsur Rahman. "A stranger in the city: The poetics of Sabk-i Hindi." Annual of Urdu Studies 19, no. 1 (2004): 93.
- Fekrat, Nasim. "Esoteric Keys of Mirza Abd al-Qadir Bidel." MA Thesis., University of Georgia, 2018.
- Feuillebois, Ève (2015). "Bīdil, ʿAbd al-Qādir". In Fleet, Kate; Krämer, Gudrun; Matringe, Denis; Nawas, John; Rowson, Everett (eds.). Encyclopaedia of Islam (3rd ed.). Brill Online. ISSN 1873-9830.
- Ghani, Abdul. Life and Works of Abdul Qadir Bedil. Lahore: Publishers United, 1960.
- Gould R. "Bīdel," Encyclopedia of Indian Religions. Ed. Arvind Sharma.. New York: Springer, 2013.
- Iqbal, Allama Muhammad. Bedil in the light of Bergson. Edited by Tehsin Firaqi. Lahore: Universal Boks/Iqbal Academy Pakistan, 1988.
- Keshavmurthy, Prashant. Persian Authorship and Canonicity in Late Mughal Delhi: Building an Ark. Routledge, 2016.
- Kovacs, Hajnalka. "‘The Tavern of the Manifestation of Realities’: The ‘Masnavi Muhit-i azam’by Mirza Abd al-Qadir Bedil (1644–1720)." PhD diss., University of Chicago (2013).}
- Pandari, Yadollah Jalali; Hirtenstein, Stephen; Negahban, Farzin (2013). "Bīdil (Bedil)". In Madelung, Wilferd; Daftary, Farhad (eds.). Encyclopaedia Islamica Online. Brill Online. ISSN 1875-9831.
- Siddiqi, Mohammed Moazzam. An Examination of the Indo-Persian Mystical Poet Mīrzā ʻAbdul Qādir Bēdil with Particular Reference to His Chief Work ʻIrfān. University of California, 1975.}
- Zipoli, Riccardo. "A computer-assisted analysis of Bidel's' Tur-e Ma ‘refat'." Annali di Ca'Foscari: Rivista della Facoltà di Lingue e Letterature straniere dell'Università di Ca'Foscari, 2005, vol. 44 (3), pp. 123–138 (2005).
- Zipoli, Riccardo. Riflessi di Persia-Reflections of Persia. Venezia: Libreria Editrice Cafoscarina, 2013.
