= Kharabat =

Kharabat may refer to:

- Kharabat, Kabul, a district of Kabul in Afghanistan
- Kharabat (Persian), a term in Persian poetry and culture

== See also ==
- Kharabad, a village in Kerman Province, Iran
