= The Rough Guide to the Music of Afghanistan =

The Rough Guide To The Music Of Afghanistan

Compilation album by Various artists
- Released: 30 August 2010
- Genre: World, Afghan
- Length: 112:55
- Label: World Music Network

Full series chronology
The Rough Guide to World Music for Children (2010)	The Rough Guide To The Music Of Afghanistan (2010)	The Rough Guide to Desert Blues (2010)

The Rough Guide To The Music Of Afghanistan is a world music compilation album originally released in 2010. Part of the World Music Network Rough Guides series, the release covers a wide breadth of the music of Afghanistan on Disc One, and contains a "bonus" Disc Two highlighting the Ahmad Sham Sufi Qawwali Group. The album was compiled by Simon Broughton, editor of world music magazine Songlines, who also compiled The Rough Guide to the Music of Central Asia.

== Critical reception ==
Professional ratings
Review scores
Source	Rating
MSN Music (Expert Witness)	(2-star Honorable Mention)
PopMatters	7/10 stars
The Scotsman	5/5 stars
Songlines	3/5 stars

Jill Turner of GondwanaSound Radio rated it amongst the best compilation albums of the year. Chris Nickson of AllMusic praised the variety of the recording, while Deanne Sole of PopMatters wrote that Broughton's choice to select a wide range of styles meant that the listener would not hear the absolute best of Afghan music, but that the album gives an "opportunity to listen to the country through a kind of panopticon, ears out in 15 different directions."

== Track listing ==
=== Disc One ===
No.	Title	Artist	Length
1.	"Zim Zim Zim"	Setara Hussainzada	1:38
2.	"Gar Konad Saheb-E-Man"	Mahwash	5:23
3.	"Ba Ayadat Beya"	Ghulam Hussain	5:21
4.	"Leili-Jan"	Ahmad Zahir	3:28
5.	"Meena Dakhklo Sanga Kaygi"	Naghma	5:07
6.	"Salaamalek"	Farhad Darya	4:50
7.	"Dobaiti Hazaragi"	Safdar Tawakuli	2:46
8.	"Logari Tunes"	Mashinai	4:09
9.	"Jâm-e Nârenji"	Ustad Rahim Khushnawaz, Gada Mohammad & Azim Hassanpur	3:54
10.	"Mola Mamad Djan"	Mahwash	4:31
11.	"Kataghani"	Homayun Sakhi	3:58
12.	"Dar Khyal-e Ishq-e Khuban"	Mehri Maftun	3:41
13.	"Salaam Afghanistan"	Farhad Darya	4:26
14.	"Sabza Ba Naaz Mea Ayad"	Rafi Naabzada & Hameed Sakhizada	3:17
15.	"Rae Maykhana O Masjid (The Way To The Mosque And The Winehouse)"	Ahmad Sham Sufi Qawwali Group	6:38

=== Disc Two ===
All tracks on Disc Two are performed by the Ahmad Sham Sufi Qawwali Group.

No.	Title	Length
1.	"Rae Maykhana O Masjid (The Way To The Mosque And The Winehouse)"	6:38
2.	"Zikre Tu Chee Shireen Ast (Your Prayer Is So Sweet!)"	6:43
3.	"Mar Dar Do Jahan (I'm In Two Worlds)"	5:41
4.	"Sare Buredae Ma Ra (My Severed Head)"	7:38
5.	"Choon Nai Ba Nawa Amad (Since The Reed Began To Sing)"	5:05
6.	"Beshnaw Az Nai Choon Hekayat Mekonad (Listen To This Reed Forlorn)"	5:07
7.	"Ay Sholae Hazeen (Oh Desolate Flame!)"	6:21
8.	"Dunya Kisa Ke Pyar Main (The Earth Is The Place Of My Love)"	5:08
