= Huwaida =

Huwaida or Howaida is a given name and surname and may refer to:

- Huwayda, Lebanese singer and actress, daughter of Lebanese singer Sabah
- Huwaida Arraf (born 1976), Palestinian American activist
- Arash Howaida, Afghani singer, son of Zahir Howaida
- Zahir Howaida (1946–2012), Afghan musician
