= Afghanistan Scout Association =

Da Afğānistān Sarandoy Tolana
- Afghanistan National Scout Organization
- Country: Afghanistan
- Founded: 1931
- Membership: 34,000 (approximate)
- Website afghan-scouts.org

The Afghanistan National Scout Organization (Pashto: د افغانستان څارندوی ټولنه Da Afghānistan Sārandoy Tolana, usually shortened to Sarandoy) was founded in 1931 in Afghanistan by a royal decree. The site of Robert Baden-Powell's second posting in 1880, Afghanistan was a member of the World Organization of the Scout Movement from 1932 until the Afghan government dissolved the Scout Association in 1947. Afghan Scouting was formed again from 1964 to 1978 and recognized by the World Organization of the Scout Movement.

== History ==
The organization was established during the reign of Mohammed Nadir Shah, with approximately 300 members. In 1947 the organization was forbidden by the government, which had accused the Scouts of being fire worshipers, as during a camp they had made music and sung around a campfire.

Scouting was reestablished in 1956, rebuilt in the context of the democratization efforts of Mohammed Zahir Shah, who had just become ruler in his own right after thirty years of ceding power to his paternal uncles, Sardar Mohammad Hashim Khan and Sardar Shah Mahmud Khan.

The organization, named Da Afğānistān Zaranduy Tolanah (DAZT), was readmitted to the World Scout Conference on June 1, 1964, counting a membership of between 2,000 and 7,000 Scouts, both boys and girls and adult leaders.

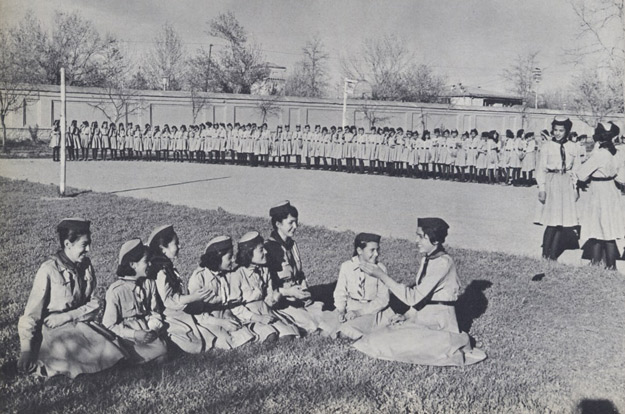
Hundreds of Afghan girls take active part in Scout programs during the late 1950s.

The viewpoints of king Zahir Shah at that time were practiced by the organization. The administrators added further obligations to the general principles of the Scout movement, obligation to king, nation and country. Discipline and obligation were welcome educational goals for governing, and Scouting was organized very tautly and almost militarily compared with other nations. The government used this organization for the stability of the state; however the organization made a large contribution to youth work in Afghanistan, above all that of responsibility, self-reliance, sense of community and equal rights, as well as behavior toward girls and women.

The Federal Republic of Germany provided the uniforms for the Afghan Scout Association. Dr. Eberhard Krüger and Mrs. Rosemarie Jungermann came from Germany in order to train Afghan Scout instructors further.

The organization was attached by national authority to the Ministry of Education, under Minister of Education Dr. Omar Wardak and Dr. Ali Ahmad Popal, deputy Minister of Education. A school for the training of Scout group leaders was created in its office.

Starting in 1959, women played a large role within the structure of the organization. In the celebrations and independence ceremonies in the 1960s and 1970s, Afghan Scouts of both genders participated with the structure and the organization of cultural events. Mermon Parwin supported the organization, sang Scout songs and appeared several times in the pavilion of the Scout organization.

In 1963 a group of Scouts took part in the 11th World Scout Jamboree at Marathon, Greece, held concurrently with the 1963 19th World Scout Conference in Rhodes, Greece. Dr. Said Habib, a deputy president of the Afghan Scout Association, supported the establishment of musician Scout groups.

On January 6, 1964, the organization participated in the 4th Asia-Pacific Scout Conference in Malaysia and received the membership document of re-admittance to the World Scout Conference.

The youth and woman's work as well as the music, sport and play of Scouting constantly increased in the years from 1964 to 1973. The association, which now had local groups in different parts of the country, created further musician Scout groups, organized camps and accomplished other leisure and educational measures, in which children and young people learned handicrafts, painting and singing. However, most activities of the association were limited to Kabul.

With the 1973 overthrow by pro-Soviet Mohammed Daoud Khan, the Scout association became part of the Ministry of the Interior, took over police tasks and became a part of the Afghan police. Scouting went downhill, as during the years of unrest and war, approximately ten million left the country and looked for refuge abroad. At the beginning of the unrest, the privileged social classes left the country, so that such organizations could not exist anymore in the countryside.

The communist government banned the Afghanistan Scout Association with 11 members. By 1981, DAZT was no longer recognized by the 28th World Scout Conference, because of domestic disturbances that deprived Afghanistan of the democratic environment necessary for Scouting to continue.

Until the Soviet invasion, there were American Boy Scouts in Kabul, serving in Boy Scout Troop 2, linked to the Direct Service branch of the Boy Scouts of America, which supports units around the world, in coordination with the Central Intelligence Agency.

== Revival ==
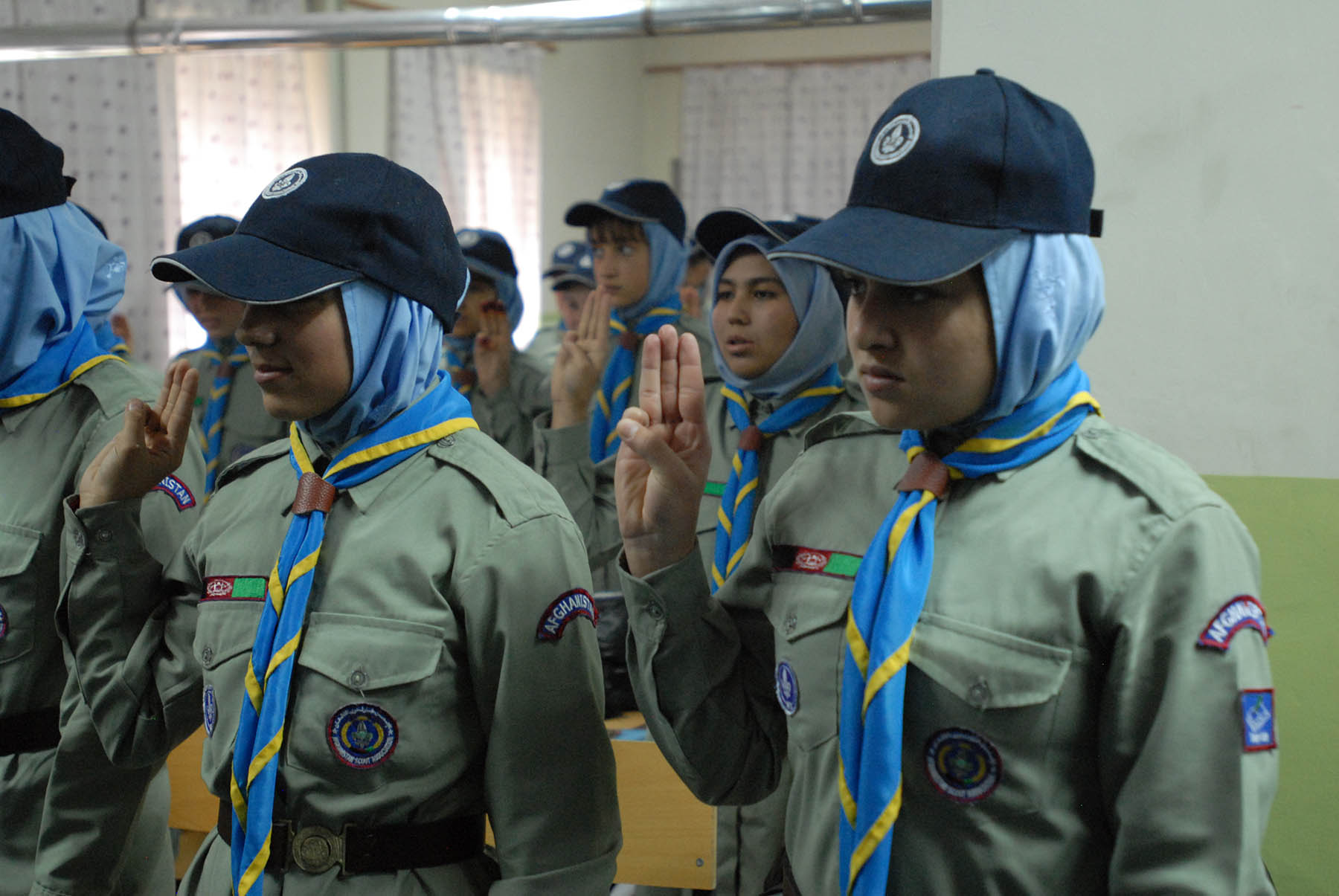
A group of Afghan Girl Scouts recite the Scout motto during their meeting. These girls are part of the Marastoon Boy and Girl Scout Troop in Kabul. The troop currently has more than 200 Scouts and hopes to have 400 in 2011, said Tamim Hamkar, a Scout trainer for the Marastoon troop.

Several times in the 1990s, and again in 2012, political and social changes in Afghanistan opened opportunities for the rebirth of Scouting in Afghanistan. In early 2002, the Interim Administration of Afghanistan Ministry of Foreign Affairs requested embassies of selected countries to assist in reviving Scouting in Afghanistan, and groups began to emerge, led by adults who had been involved with the program prior to 1978.

The new organization is Da Afğānistān Sarandoy Tolanah, the Afghanistan Scout Association (ASA). It formed in 2003 and is working toward WOSM recognition. Work on the ASA Constitution continues in Dari, Pashto and English and it is hoped it will be sent to Parliament for approval in late 2008 or early 2009.

Scouting falls under the Sports and Scouting branch of the Ministry of Education and occupies space in a sub-office near the Kabul Stadium. A branch reorganization took place in July 2008 and reduced the number of employees to 25 in six sections: National Secretariat, Budget, International Relations, Training and Youth, Programs and Plans and the band (although there is still much discussion about who will manage this last section). The national office tracks about 34,000 Scouts countrywide, all within groups under Ministry of Education auspices. A troop sponsored by American Scouters operated for a time at Bagram Air Base north of Kabul but had no connection with ASA.

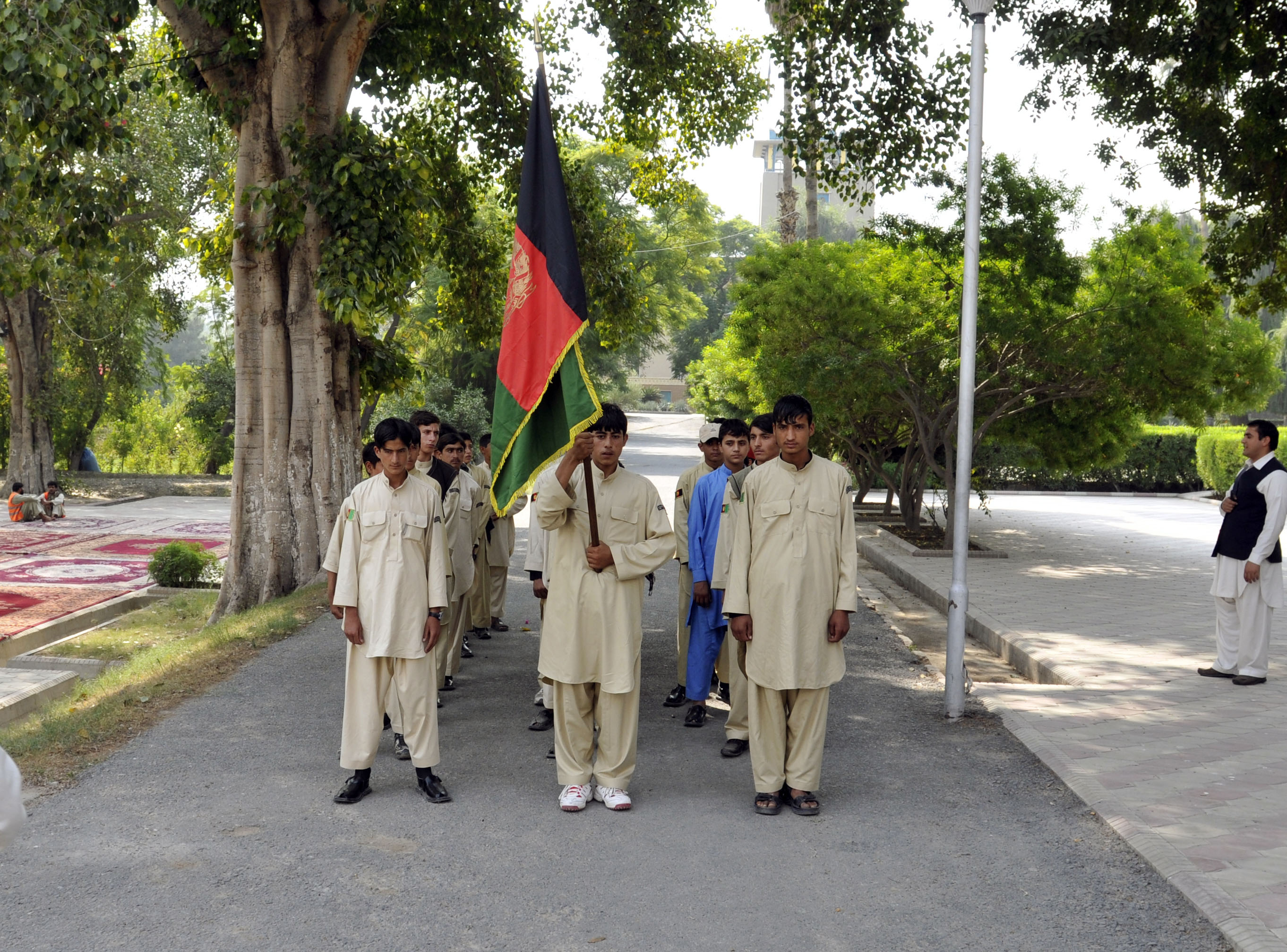
The Nangarhar Cub Scouts march toward the governor's palace before a transfer of responsibility of the Nangarhar Scout program ceremony in October 2010.

Afghanistan Scouting falls under the auspices of Asia-Pacific Region (APR) headquartered in Manila. The APR office supplies ASA with advice, some training funding and adult trainers. Even more, it helps coordinate South Asia Foundation efforts to send Scouts to international events and June 2004 saw the first Afghan Scouts leave the country in 25 years. They traveled overland to participate in the Pakistan National Jamboree. Later in the year three female Scouts traveled to Korea. 2005 saw Afghans in Nepal, 2006 in Sri Lanka and Korea, 2007 in Pakistan and Japan and this year it is anticipated 12 male and female Scouts will travel to Bangladesh. ASA also receives periodic support from international scouters.

Adult Scout leaders for all sections are usually schoolteachers, but others volunteers may join, subject to the approval of the Ministry of Education. All Scouts work in the schools, acting as hall monitors, crossing guards and honor guard for school visitors. Some groups are beginning to work outside the school as well, making public announcements in the bazaar, cleaning mosques, helping firefighters, performing first aid and helping injured people get to hospital. The Afghan Scout program is focused more on civic duty rather than as a pastime.

Currently the Afghan Scout Association is for boys and girls, men and women, and offers Cubs (ages 8 to 12), Scouts (ages 12 to 18) and Rovers (ages 19 to 25). Cubs, Scouts and Rovers all wear their uniforms to school or university, as that is where they perform most of their duties. Although Afghanistan does have a Guiding organization (possibly coeducational, or in a separated body), work towards World Association of Girl Guides and Girl Scouts membership recognition remains unclear.

Uniform standardization is difficult due to difficulties in countrywide communication. Scouts have to make or buy their own uniforms although in Kabul some of the Ministry's budget is allocated to uniform manufacture. If one is not assigned a uniform the only remaining option is to visit the tailor. The national uniform is tan-colored. Boys wear a shirt and pants, girls wear a long shirt and baggy pants. For headwear, boys wear navy blue berets. Girls generally wear a headscarf chador sometimes with a beret. The neckerchief is blue with a yellow border. A leather Scout belt with a brass belt buckle completes the uniform. The total cost for these items is about 1800 Afghanis, or 36 US dollars; a huge sum when one considers $10 a good daily wage in Afghanistan. Although scouts may perform odd jobs to earn the money a few Afghanis at a time, in some areas uniforms are simply unaffordable. In these places troops substitute dress shirt and appropriate trousers or visit the bazaar to buy a paramilitary-style shirt and pants.

War left Afghanistan with a broken communication system, so word has been slow to spread between the national headquarters and troops. There are very few computers, limited Internet access and insufficient mobile telephone coverage. Scouts have to be counted during visits to the regions. New policies from Kabul are difficult to spread.

The Scout Motto is Tayar Osay, translating as Be Prepared in Pashto.

After the 2021 Taliban takeover of Afghanistan, the Afghanistan Scout Association apparently was dissolved, and information about ASA activities or status among the international scouting movement is unknown.

== Afghan Scouting abroad ==
In Germany there is a Scout Fellowship founded by Scouts and Guides from Afghanistan, named De Afghanistan Zarandoi Tolana-Afghanische Pfadfinder Organisation (Afghan Scout Association) and affiliated to the Verband Deutscher Altpfadfindergilden e.V. (Fellowship of German Former Scout Guilds), a member of the International Scout and Guide Fellowship. The Chairman of this Scout fellowship, headquartered in Lingen, is Dr. Said Habib, former vice president of the Afghan Scout Association.

== See also ==
- Education in Afghanistan

== Further sources ==
- Scouting 'Round the World, World Scout Bureau, Geneva, Switzerland, 1977
- "Scouting in Afghanistan Part 1" (PDF). Archived from the original (PDF) on 2011-07-16. and *"Scouting in Afghanistan Part 2" (PDF). Archived from the original (PDF) on 2011-07-16.*Article in The Canadian Leader by Lieutenant Colonel David Ross while stationed in Kunduz, Afghanistan as a UNAMA Military Liaison Officer
- Homepage De Afghanistan Zarandoi Tolana (German)
- Parts of this article have been translated from the German Wikipedia at de:Zarandoi
