= Mohammad Hashem Cheshti =

Afghanistan classical musician (d. 1994)

- Origin: Kabul, Afghanistan
- Died: 1994; Germany
- Genres: Klasik
- Instrument: Tabla

Mohammad Hashem Cheshti, also known with surname Chishti and as Ustad Hashem (Persian: استاد هاشم), was a contemporary classical musician and composer born in Kharabat area of Kabul, Afghanistan, who died in 1994 in Germany under unclear circumstances.

== Early life ==
Ustad Hashem was born and raised in a musical family, which originally came from Kasur in Punjab, but settled in the 19th century in Kabul as court musicians. Several of his close family members, including his brothers and his father are/were also famous musicians in their own right. Both he and his brothers appeared regularly on Afghan Television and Radio prior to the Russian invasion of Afghanistan and the subsequent wars. He accompanied regularly other famous Afghan musicians like Ahmad Zahir and Ustad Mahwash on his tabla.

He was the teacher and mentor of Ustad Mahwash, the first Afghan female master musician and Zuleikha, a US American dancer and artist. He mastered many different traditional Afghan instruments, but his greatest passion was for the tabla, his mastership of which was supreme. Following the Russian invasion of Afghanistan he had to flee his home country and emigrated to Germany where he died in 1994, killed by one of his former students for reasons unknown.

== See also ==
- Music of Afghanistan
