= Mahwash =

Afghan singer (born 1947)

Ustad Farida Mahwash استاد مهوش
- Born: 1947 (age 78–79); Karte chaar Kabul, Afghanistan
- Genres: Pop; Classical Music; Ghazals
- Years active: 1970 to present
- Label: WorldHarmonyStudios-DEMUSIC Records

Ustad Farida Mahwash (Dari: استاد فریده مهوش); (born 1947) is an Afghan singer and voice of Afghanistan. She was the first woman (as of 2013) to have been conferred the honorary title of "Ustad" (meaning Master or Maestra in Farsi Dari) in 1977. She currently lives in Fremont, California, US; and tours the world with her latest ensemble, "Voices of Afghanistan".

== Biography ==
=== Early life ===
Farida Gulali Ayubi was born into a conservative Afghan family, and her mother was a Quran teacher. Her interest in music was opposed by her parents on religious grounds. Upon completing her studies, Farida was recruited to sing for Kabul Radio. The station's director, Ustad Khayal, encouraged her to pursue singing as a career. This is when Farida acquired her stage name, Mahwash, meaning "like the moon."

=== Early music career ===
Mahwash took music and singing lessons under Ustad Mohammad Hashem Cheshti. An established maestro, Chishti quickly launched his protégé on a rigorous training regime. Most of his lessons, which are based on North Indian classical music, are still used today to train Afghan singers. Mahwash went on to study with the renowned Afghan singer Ustad Hussain Khan Sarahang, who guided her through her meteoric rise as a radio star. Another master composer, Ustad Shahwali, created many songs for her to sing on the radio. One of the best known was Ustad Shahwali which brings together half a dozen regional songs in one extended modern song cycle. When Mahwash learned this complex piece and recorded it in a single day, she was given the title of Ustad—or "master" in 1977—a controversial move as, until that point, this was an honour reserved only for men. After the political turmoil of late 1970s and '80s, Ustad Mahwash was forced to leave Afghanistan.

=== Moving ===
In 1991, she and her family moved to Pakistan, where she took refuge from two warring factions, each of whom wanted her to sing for their cause, or face assassination. Worn and exhausted, she applied for asylum abroad, and, eventually, her plight was recognised by the United Nations High Commissioner for Refugees] (UNHCR). Mahwash was granted political asylum in the United States in October 1991.

In 2001, Mahwash reunited with other exiled musicians to form and lead the ensemble Kabul . This group performed at several highly prestigious concert halls in Europe. In 2003, Mahwash and the Kabul Ensemble recorded the critically acclaimed album titled Radio Kaboul (Accords Croisés). This rich collection pays homage to the disappeared or exiled composers and musicians of Afghan radio's golden era. Later that year, Mahwash received a prestigious BBC Radio 3 World Music Award both for her artistic excellence and for her work in speaking on behalf of thousands of orphaned Afghan children. In 2007, Mahwash followed up with a recording secular and sacred love poems, Ghazals Afghans (Accords Croises/Harmonia Mundi), in which, Martina Catella notes, "The legendary queen of ornamentation displays a rainbow of the most refined tones and colors to express feelings of love.”

=== Voices of Afghanistan ===
In 2012 Mahwash became a member of the group Voices of Afghanistan, an Afghan ensemble featuring Mahwash on vocals, rubab master Homayoun Sakhi, and The Sakhi Ensemble. Also were other notable Afghan master/ and Uzbekistan (Abbos Kosimov) musicians and singers. This collaboration debuted in June 2012 under the direction of music producer and composer Dawn Elder, who created this group with Mawash and Homayoun.

One of their landmark performances came before 27,000 American fans at the Carrier Dome for the One World Concert event. In 2012, Mahwash, Homayoun Sakhi and the group began recording a new album with world music producer Dawn Elder and Sam Nappi at World Harmony Studios. After a year in the making they are now preparing the release. In this recording Ustad Mahwash, Homayoun Sakhi and the group are joined by a host of notable celebrity musicians and singers including Grammy winning singer Angelique Kidjo. The album is set to release on World Harmony Studios/D E Music Records is entitled "Love Songs for Humanity". The official release is on 3 September 2013 on line and in stores on 27 September 2013.

== Discography ==
Contributing artist

- The Rough Guide to the Music of Afghanistan (2010, World Music Network)
- "Love Songs for Humanity (2013, D E Music)

== Awards ==
- Janis Joplin Award.
- Golden Voice Award.
- World Music Award in 2003, by BBC, Winner in the Asia Category, within the Kaboul Ensemble
