= Radio Shariat =

Afghanistan radio service under Taliban rule

Radio Shariat (meaning Islamic law) was the mouthpiece of the Taliban-ruled Islamic Emirate of Afghanistan, broadcasting religious programs and official decrees and announcements. The broadcasts were carried over twenty transmitting towers. It was the foreign media's main source of information from the Taliban.

Early in the United States invasion of Afghanistan, on October 8, 2001, U.S. forces bombed the main building and antennas of Radio Shariat. The U.S. then utilized the same frequencies to broadcast music with instrumental accompaniments (which had been banned by the Taliban) as well as announcements and information in Dari and Pashto.

Within days of the Taliban's ouster from Kabul, Radio Afghanistan had replaced Radio Shariat.

The U.S. bombing of the station was decried by members of the international media.

== See also ==
- Mass media in Afghanistan
- Radio Television Afghanistan
- List of radio stations in Afghanistan
- Radio Afghanistan
