= Beltoon =

مومن خان بيلتون Momin Khan Biltoon
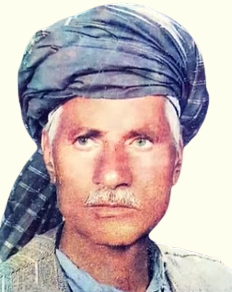
- Beltoon in 1980s

Background information
- Born: Momin Khan Biltoon c. 1920
- Died: November 9, 2015 Kabul, Afghanistan
- Genre: Ghazals
- Occupation: Musician

Momin Khan Biltoon (Pashto: مومن خان بیلتون), also known as his honorific title Ustad Beltoon, was an Afghan Pashtun singer from Logar Province, Afghanistan. Biltoon sang mainly in his native Pashto language but also sang in the Dari language as well. His style of music reflects the Kharabat style of Kabul.

== Early life ==
He was born in Chakari village of Khaki Jabbar District, Kabul. However, he spent most of his life in Logar Province of Afghanistan. Biltoon's father died before he was born, and his mother did so when he was young. He was raised by his sister in Logar Province of Afghanistan. Biltoon learned the rubab and tanbur at a young age. He started singing at the age of 15. His first song was in both Pashto and Dari.

Having made contributions to Afghan traditional music for over 70 years, Biltoon died at the age of 95 in Kabul. He was buried in Beni Hesar of Kabul.
