= Parasto =

Afghan singer (born 1954)

پرستو Parasto Mehryar
- Birth name: Nooria (نوریه)
- Born: 06 March 1954 (age 70–71); Kabul, Kingdom of Afghanistan
- Genres: Pop
- Occupation: Singer
- Years active: 1970-present
- Labels: Various

Parasto (Dari: پرستو, born Nooria) is an Afghan singer. She has been a singer since the 1970s and rose to fame with her former husband Rahim Mehryar.

== Biography ==
Parasto came from a very strict religious family from Kabul. She started her career with the song "Saqi" in 1969 on Radio Kabul. Parasto graduated from Zarghona Girls' High School in Kabul. Her most popular songs are composed by Ustad Khyal such as "Juz Tu Zinda Am", "Zindagi Yak Rahe Door", "Yak Shabe Baraani", "Pa Ashoqi Ke"; also she has sung compositions by Waheed Qasimi & Farhad Darya. "Dil e Aadam" is one of Waheed Qasemi's compositions. Her songs "Shahr bay Darwaza" and Dilake Sawdayi were composed by Farhad Darya.

In December 2009, Parasto was awarded the title of "Sitara-e- Hunar" at the ATN Awards in Hamburg, Germany. Also, in 2011 she won the ATN award for best female singer.

Parasto's father is from Laghman, where she also lived briefly, while her mother is from Kabul. Parasto is bilingual in Dari and Pashto, and is fluent in German.

On June 24, 2010, Parasto's husband, Rahim Mehryar, died after suffering from cancer. Parasto returned to Afghanistan in November 2010 to perform for Afghans in Afghanistan and she was applauded by a lot of fans there.
