= Rahim Bakhsh =

Ustad Rahim Bakhsh محمد رحیم‌بخش
- Birth name: Rahim Bakhsh
- Also known as: Ustad Bakhsh Waris-e-Kharabat Koy e Kharabat, Ustad Rahim Bakhsh
- Born: 1922; Kharabat, Kabul, Emirate of Afghanistan
- Died: 2002 (aged 79–80)
- Genres: Khayal, thumri, tarana and ghazal classic
- Occupation: Hindustani classical Vocalist
- Years active: 1935–2000

Rahim Bakhsh (Dari: رحیم‌بخش), commonly known as an ustad (maestro) of Hindustani classical music and classical music culture from Afghanistan. He is also well-renowned and popular in a few neighboring countries. He was born in Kharabat into a well-known Kashmiri family, a traditional part city of art in Kabul and was the creator of a new classical music in Afghanistan. He was counted as a leading authority of classical music in Afghanistan. Like virtually all classical vocalists of Afghanistan, he belonged to the Patiala Gharana (gharana meaning a school or style of music) of Hindustani classical music. Bakhsh died in 2002. His last wish was to have his grave beside his teacher Ustad Qasim. Bakhsh's grave is situated in Kabul on a place called Showda where Sufis pray every Friday night.

== Early life ==
Muhammad Rahim Bakhsh was born in 1922 in Kharabat district of Kabul Afghanistan. He began his music training at the age of eight under the tutelage of his grandfather Mohammad Akbar Bakhsh and later under his father Khalifa Imamuddin Bakhsh, studying the art of tabla. By the age of 10, Mohammad Rahim Bakhsh was officially accepted by the school of Ustad Qasim Afghan, becoming the seventh string student of the Afghan master.

Bakhsh studied tabla, harmonium and vocals and sang the classical songs of his master at the school's performance events. An official of Radio Kabul invited Bakhsh to sing on national radio which was broadcast live in its entirety. His first recorded song was More khyal was highly received by the public; he was offered a full-time position as an official singer on national radio. At the age of 13, Bakhsh walked from his home in Kharabat to the radio station with musical instruments on his back, performed his songs, and walked back home, only to repeat it three more times daily.

== Personal life ==
Bakhsh had a large family, with eight daughters and six sons. Three sons are popular singers, including the late Salim Bakhsh, a classical singer, and Hussain Bakhsh, a classical and ghazal singer currently living in Finland. His youngest son Anil Bakhsh is a pop singer but is also familiar with ghazal and classical styles of music. Anil Bakhsh is currently living in Quetta pakistan

== See also ==
Hindustani classical music
