= Mermon Parwin =

Mermon Parwin میرمن پروین
- Born: Khadidja Ziai; November 21, 1924; Kabul, Afghanistan
- Died: December 9, 2004 (aged 80) Kabul, Afghanistan
- Instrument: Vocal

Mermon Parwin (1924–2004) was an Afghan singer. She was the first Afghan singer to be broadcast live on Radio Kabul.

Parwin was born Khadidja Ziai in Kabul in 1924. Her father was poet Sardar Abdul Rahim. She attended college to study midwifery and nursing. After graduation, she worked at OB/GYN clinics in Kabul.

In 1951, she performed the song "Gulfrosh" (گل فروش, meaning 'flower seller') which was broadcast on Radio Kabul. It was the first time a song sung by a woman was ever broadcast in Afghanistan's history. This moment is credited with opening the door for Afghan women to be hired as newscasters, singers, and presenters on the radio. Parwin signed a contracted with Radio Afghanistan to record songs. She sang 320 songs, including songs from Iran and Tajikistan, for the radio.

In 1971, she was awarded a medal by Mohammed Zahir Shah for her work as a singer.
