= Mir Maftoon =

Afghan musician

Maftoon Badakhshi, commonly known by his stage name Mir Maftoon (Dari: میر مفتون), is an Afghan musician. He was born in Zebak District, Badakhshan Province, around 1960s but exact date is not specified. Some other sources say he was born in the 1970s. He is an ethnic Tajik and speaks Dari Persian.

He specialized in authentic instruments, principally the dambura (a two string lute), the harmonium and the ghaychak (a two string violin). He combines the music styles from the region of Badakhshan (Northern Afghanistan) with each other and mixes musical elements of different ethnic origins of other Central Asian region's as well. In the West, Maftun is mainly known as an instrumentalist; in Afghanistan he is known as a singer as well.

His texts vary from romantic and humoristic to social critic. Maftun knew to survive in a country where music had been forbidden by the Taliban. He performed in Europe as well, like in 2001 in Arnhem in the Netherlands.

In 2001, he was honored with an international Prince Claus Award "for his musical talents and his role as a culture medium of the traditional music of North Afghanistan".

== Discography ==
Contributing artist

- 2005: Music From Afghan Badaksh
- 2010: The Rough Guide To The Music Of Afghanistan
