= Rahim Mehryar =

Afghan singer

رحيم مهریار Rahim Mehryar
- Born: 1956; Kabul, Afghanistan
- Died: 23 June 2010 (aged 53–54)
- Genres: Pop
- Occupation: Singer
- Years active: 1986–2010
- Label: Ariana Music

Rahim Mehryar (Persian: رحيم مهریار) was a singer from Afghanistan. He and his wife singer Parasto, were counted as one of the most successful musical duos in the late 1980s that dominated the pop music scene in Afghanistan. Later he moved to Germany, where he and his wife continued their music. Rahim Mehryar died of cancer in Germany on 24 June 2010.
