= Abdul Rahim Sarban =

Sarban ساربان
- Born: Abdul Rahim Mahmodi; 1930; Kabul, Kingdom of Afghanistan
- Origin: Afghanistan
- Died: April 2, 1993 (aged 62–63) Peshawar, Pakistan
- Genres: soft rock; classical music; jazz; blues
- Occupations: singer; songwriter; composer
- Instruments: vocal; harmonium; tabla; electric guitar
- Years active: 1950s–1986

Abdul Rahim Sārbān (Farsi/Farsi: عبدالرحیم ساربان) (1930 – April 2, 1993), better known as Sarban, was an Afghan singer. Sarban's music fused elements, rhythms and orchestration of the western musical traditions of Jazz and "Belle Chanson" with the prevalent Afghan musical tradition.

== Discography ==
Some of his songs include:

- Ay Shakh-e Gul
- Ahesta Boro
- Ay Sarban
- Ay Bahar Sabz
- Ay Deer ba Dast Amada bas Zod Barafti
