= DJ Besho =

Bezhan Zafarmal بيژن ظفرمل كندزى
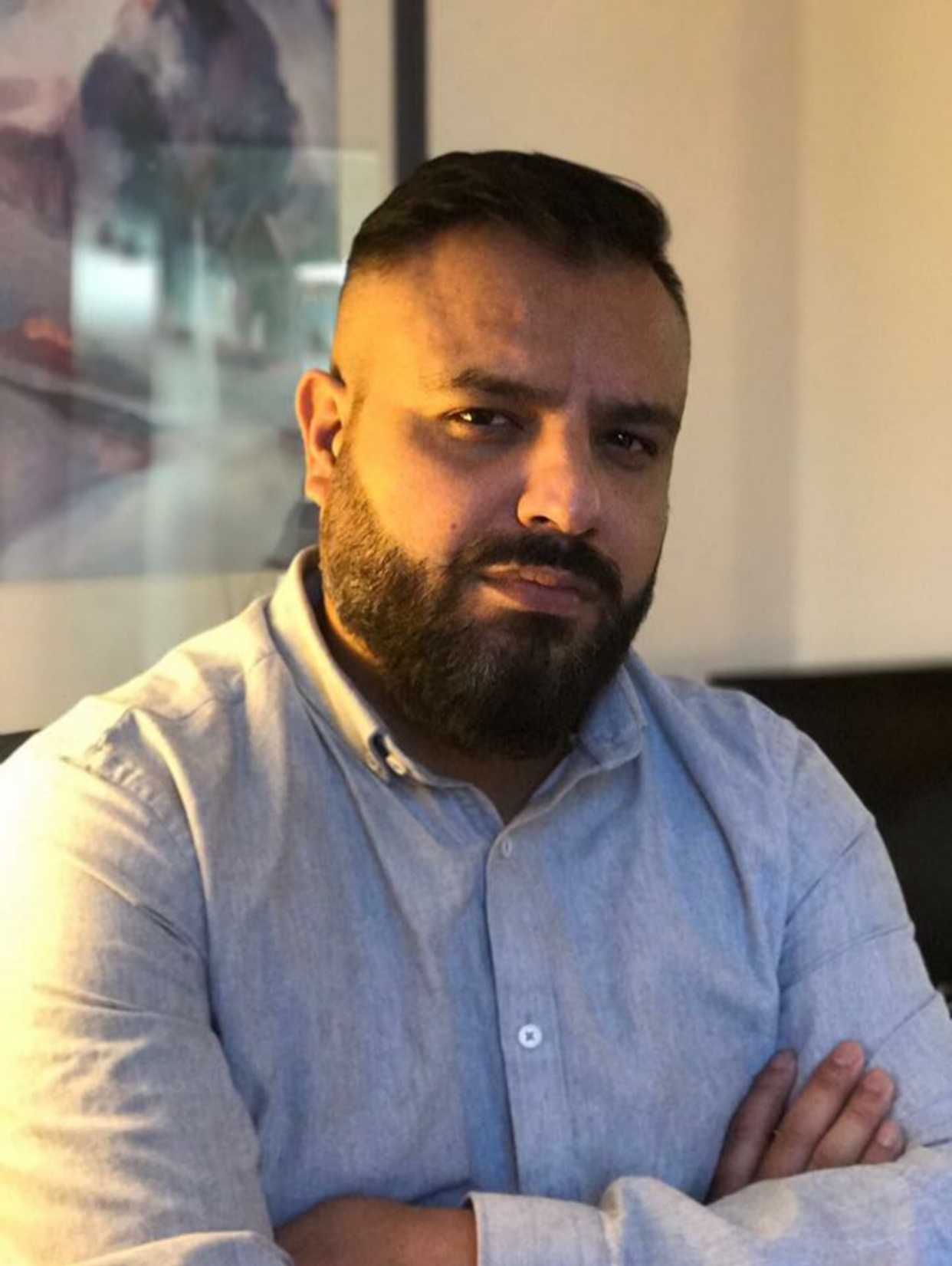
- DJ Besho in 2019

Background information
- Born: Bezhan Zafarmal; May 10, 1977 (age 48); Kunduz, Afghanistan
- Genres: Pop; classical; hip hop; dance
- Occupations: Singer, music producer, composer
- Years active: 2000–present
- Label: Afghan Old Generation
- Website: www.hassibmassoumi.wixsite.com/besho

Bezhan Zafarmal, better known by his stage name DJ Besho, is an Afghan rapper, music producer, and composer. He released his first album Bargshat (برگشت) with Moby Media Group, including a number of collaborations. He is the first Afghan rap singer to introduce hip-hop to Afghanistan.

== Early life ==
Zafarmal was born on May 10, 1977, in Kunduz, Afghanistan, the son of Dr Aziz And Mother Nasrin. He left Afghanistan when he was 10 years old. For a long time, the Afghan war forced him and his family to leave Afghanistan. They moved first to India, then China, followed by Russia, before finally settling just outside in Wiesbaden, (Germany).

== Career ==
Zafarmal lived in Beijing for two years, where he was introduced to rap music. In 1992, he moved to Wiesbaden, (Germany) and in 2006 founded ANG -Afghan New Generations Labels. He worked in Afghanistan's government radio, television. He released his first album Bargshat with Moby Media Group; the album included a number of collaborations. His follow-up album Chashmak with singer Aris Parwiz included the lead single Gozstaa. He has continued making music album and releasing singles since then, and participated in many international music concerts. He has been the recipient of several international awards.
