= Mohammad Omar (musician) =

Ustad Mohammad Omar
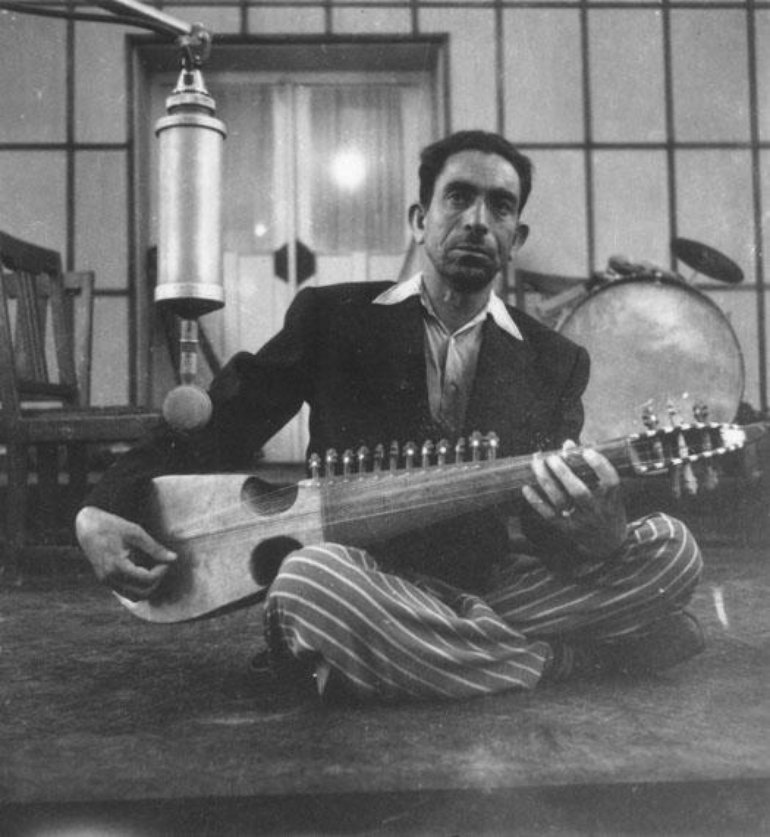
- Ustad Mohammad Omar practicing rubab

Background information
- Born: 1905; Kabul
- Origin: Kabul, Afghanistan
- Died: 1980
- Genres: Afghan classical, Rubab
- Occupation: musician

Ustad Mohammad Omar (1905–1980) was a musician from Afghanistan who played the rubab.

== Early life and career ==
Mohammad Omar began music lessons under his father, Ibrahim, who taught him singing, sarod, rubab and dutar. In the mid-20th century, he was Director of the National Orchestra of Radio Afghanistan, which brought together folk musicians from the different regions and distinct ethnic communities of Afghanistan.

In 1974, Mohammad Omar received a Fulbright-Hays Foreign Scholar Fellowship to teach at the University of Washington, making him the first Afghan musician to teach at a major university in the United States. On November 18, 1974, Mohammad Omar gave a public concert at the university, his first rabab performance in front of a Western audience; he was accompanied on tabla by Zakir Hussain. In 1978 he met the German jazz-rock groupe Embryo at the Goethe Institut in Kabul. The concert was filmed for the movie Vagabundenkarawane by Werner Penzel.

== Discography ==
- Embryo's Reise 1980 (Schneeball 20)
- Virtuoso from Afghanistan 2002 (SFW)
