= Zahir Howaida =

Singer

Zahir Howaida ظاهر هویدا
- Born: Muhammad Zahir Howaida; February 28, 1945; Sharistan District, Daykoundi, Kingdom of Afghanistan
- Died: 5 March 2012 (aged 67) Hamburg, Germany
- Genre: Pop
- Occupation: Various (mainly musician)

Zahir Howaida, also spelled as Zahir Huwaida (Dari: ظاهر هویدا) (February 28, 1945 – 5 March 2012), was an Afghan musician.He had been active since the 1960s and his popularity peaked with the hit songs "Kamar Bareek-e-Man" and "Shanidam Az Inja Safar Mikoni." Howaida was renowned for his deep, soulful voice. Almost all his songs were in the Persian language. Aside from singing, he also worked as a radio news anchor, poet, and TV actor. In his later years, he lived a secluded life in Germany and seldom performed until his death there.

== Early life ==
Muhammad Zahir Howaida was born in 1945 in Sharistan, Daikundi, into a Hazara family After his birth, his father moved the family to Kabul and thereafter to the city of Mazar-e-Sharif in the Balkh province of northern Afghanistan. For much of his life, he kept his identity secret for fear of the backlash he would face for being linked to the Hazara, which was considered a stigma.

While in Mazar-e-Sharif, Zahir Howaida entered the first grade at the Sultan Ghiassuddin Elementary school in 1953. The same year Zahir's father died at the age of 33 leaving behind Zahira widowed mother, and a brother, Kabir who would later become a piano player. The family moved back to Kabul, where Zahir attended 2nd grade at the Sayed Jamaluddin Afghan elementary school.

At the age of 13, Zahir's family moved to Booksellers Avenue in Kabul and subsequently entered the French Isteqlal High School, earning the highest ranking in his class. Zahir didn't find the school curriculum very interesting and often cut class to walk across the school to the public library to borrow books of his interest and read them. Zahir was a mandolin player and a backup singer for Akbar Ramish at the Isteqlal High school shows celebrating Afghan Independence Day. Naynawaz encouraged Zahir to sing solo, but he didn't find it suitable during the live show to sing at such a short notice. Hamid Estemadi who had a great voice but did not sing publicly since he was a member of the royal family encouraged Zahir to take his place at the Afghanistan Day show. Zahir was dragged on stage by Hamid and he sang his first song, but was faced with the displeasure of the crowd. Moments later Zahir appeared in costume during a play and sang another song which delighted the audience and received an endurance of applause.

== Senior years ==
Upon graduating high school, Zahir attended the Institute of Theatre and Arts of Kabul and joined the Kabul Armature Orchestra led by Fazel Ahmad Zekria Naynawaz along with his brother Kabir Howaida, Rahim Mehryar, Rahim Jahani and more. At this orchestra Zahir showed immense talent as a vocalist and earned a scholarship to learn operatic and eastern classical music at Tchaikovsky Institute in Moscow in 1966. After Moscow he spend time in Tehran in 1972. There, he performed the song "Kamar Bareek-e-Man" which became an instant hit in Iran, where for years many Iranian singers covered the song in concerts and on Iranian national television.

Upon his return to Kabul, Zahir began his musical career which brought him an overnight success. He composed all his songs except 4 songs which he often credited to their original composers Ahmad Zahir and Mashoor Jamal. The songs "Rasha dar dast baghban" and "Gar zolf preishanat" are of Ahmad Zahir and "Laila mah man shoda shaida" and "Ay mo telaie" are compositions of Jamal.

Howaida was fond of tea and cigarettes. He also read many books about social and political issues. His favorite author was Maxim Gorky and his favorite subject was socialist and social democratic ideas.

Many of Howaida's songs are politically anti-establishment in nature. He often spoke out against the monarchy and the first president of the Afghan republic, Mohammad Daoud Khan. While all artists who wished to appear on National TV were authorized to sing in Persian.

Howaida after the fall of the republic of Afghanistan into the hands of the Marxist communist regime found many opportunities on National Television and Radio Kabul. He recorded most of his songs during this tenure, hosting a variety of shows on both mediums.

After the fall of the communist government, Zahir and his family fled to Germany. He toured the world with stops in North America, Europe and Australia for his farewell concert where he broke his vow and sang in Pashto. He followed the concert with the release of his final album "Ay Kash".

== Personal life ==
On 5 March 2012, as he was suffering from illness, Howaida died at the age of 67 at his home in Hamburg. Well-known singers from the worldwide Afghan diaspora attended his funeral in Hamburg.

He left behind five children, of which two, Arash Howaida and Massi Howaida, followed their father into the music industry.

Arash Howaida, sometimes known by the mononym Arash, has released a number of hits including "Laila" and "Alah Alah" (2007), "Dunya" (2008), "Wahh Wahh" (2011). He is also a successful songwriter and music producer.
