= Klasik =

Classical music of Afghanistan

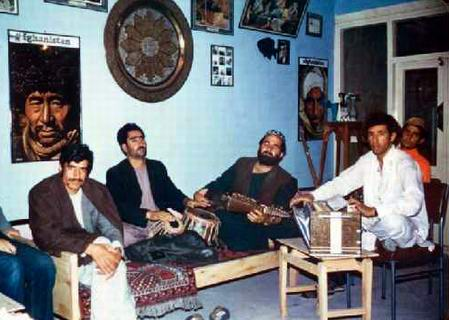
Afghan musicians, Herat 1973

The classical music of Afghanistan is called klasik, which includes both instrumental (rāgas, naghmehs) and vocal forms (ghazals). Many ustad, or professional musicians, are descended from Indian artists who emigrated to the royal court in Kabul in the 1860s upon the invitation of Amir Sher Ali Khan.

These north Indian musicians use Hindustani terminology and structures. Afghan ragas, in contrast to Indian ones, tend to be more focused on rhythm, and are usually played with the tabla, imported from India, or the native zerbaghali, daireh or dohol, all percussive instruments.

An important characteristic of the Afghan ghazal is that, unlike the Indian talas and ragas it is based on, Afghan ghazal features the "repetitive use of fast instrumental sections interpolated between units of text", an element derived from Pashtun music.

Afghan ghazal is viewed as a "light-classical" form of Indian music, which uses Persian texts consisting of a series of rhyming couplets, many written by spiritual poets like Bedil, Sa'adi and Hafez.

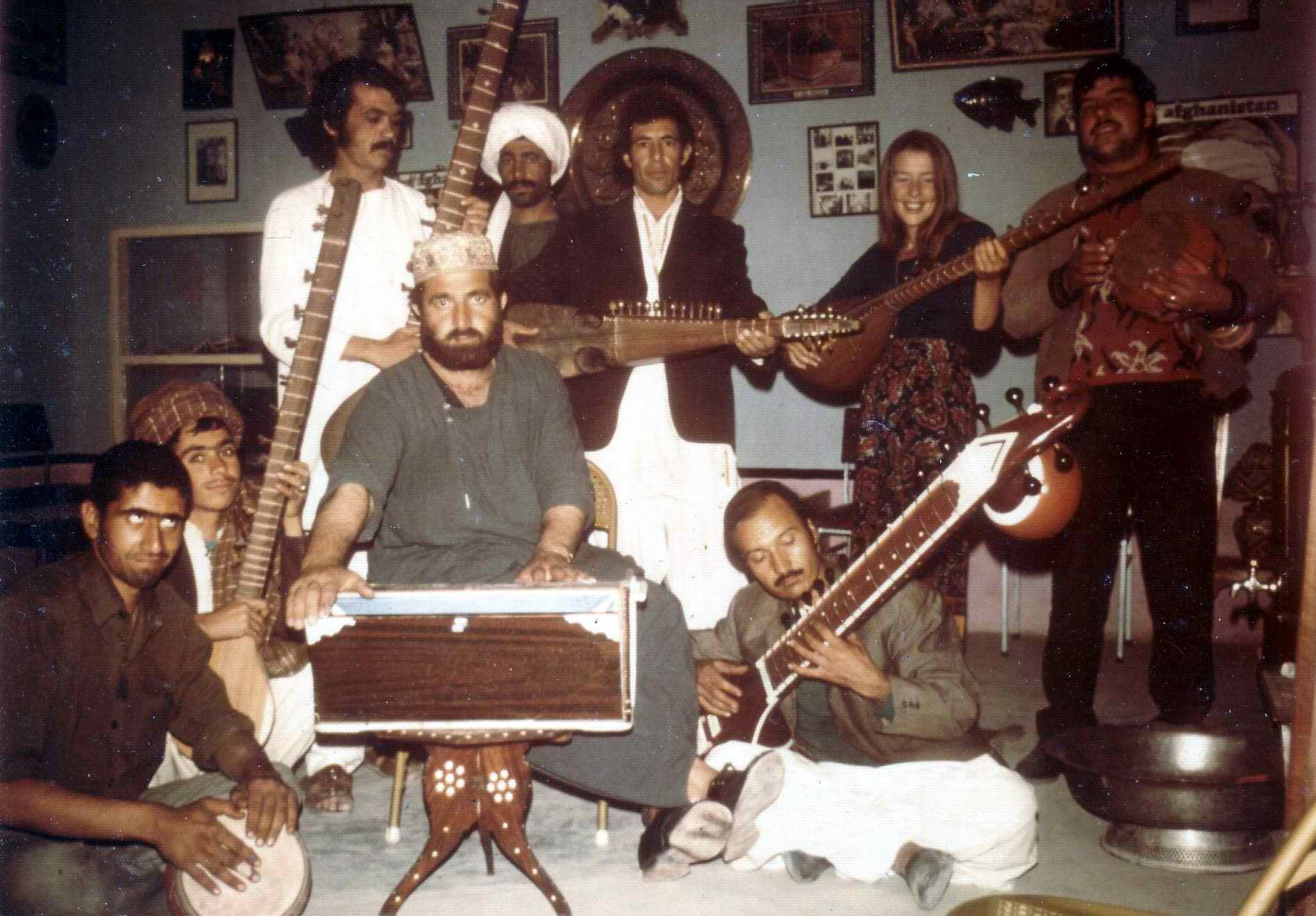
Musicians in Herat with tourist, 1973

== See also ==
- Ustad Mohammad Omar
