= Kharabat (poetry) =

Kharabat (Persian: خرابات) is a term in Persian poetry, sometimes used as a proverb. It has been suggested, as a possible etymological explanation, that the word was created as a combination of the two (exactly opposite) words kharab ("ruinous") and abad ("prosperous", also a suffix forming city names).

In the words of Prof. Hamid Dabashi; "Persian literary historians have concurred that the word originally meant "house or tavern of ill repute" but was eventually appropriated by mystics to mean a place that they frequent by way of suspending all hypocritical pretense to piety (...) The idea is that there are places that you can frequent that will dismantle your beliefs, and yet, in doing so, will also restore your faith. The proverbial tavern in Persian poetry is that kharabat."

Nonetheless, since vowels are often omitted in Persian, the word could also be read as Khor-abat or, meaning the site of Khor. The word Khor refers to the Sun. The modern term for the Sun in Persian in Khor-shid, meaning "Sun shine." This would link Persian poetry also to the ancient mystery cult of Mithraism, in which wine played a liturgical role. In this context, Khor-abat could potentially refer to type of Mithraeum. It could also symbolically refer to a high level of spirituality, that initiates would achieve through step-wise and arduous fellowship.

== Sources ==
- Dabashi, Hamid (2013). Being a Muslim in the World. Palgrave Macmillan. ISBN 978-1137301284.
