= Kharabat, Kabul =

Kharabat خرابات
- Neighborhood
- Country: Afghanistan
- Province: Kabul

Kharābat (Dari: خراابات) is a neighborhood in the old city of Kabul, Afghanistan. It is a historic area near Hinduguzar, the quarter of Hindus and Sikhs. It has long accommodated musicians. Kharābat has educated many famous musicians of Afghanistan in the Indian Patiali school.

== Terminology ==
The reason why the area is called Kharabat can be traced back to the term in Persian poetry, where it originally referred to taverns. Like taverns, where people dance and listen to music, the area in Kabul was a place where many local musicians lived as well as where private concerts took place.

== Musical heritage ==
Important Afghan musicians were born there, as well as the songs of the Indian Dari poets Ustad Qasem Jo, Ustad Natu, Rahim Bakhsh, and Mohammad Omer, master of the rubab. During the time of Ali Shir Khan, it became a centre of art and music and home to many great artists such as Father Ustad Qasem Jo and the predecessor of Mohammad Hussain Sarahang.

== War and rebuilding ==
During the rule of the Taliban, many musicians emigrated. Many sons and daughters of Kharābat musicians returned after the fall of the Taliban in 2001 to rebuild the community, including Sitar Jo ("Sitar-student") and Qasem Jo (Wahid Qasemi).

== Notable people ==
- Mohammad Hashem Cheshti (died 1994), classical musician and composer
- Ghulam Dastagir Shaida (1916–1970), singer and musician

== See also ==
- Kabul City

== Sources ==
- Arnold, Alison (2000). The Garland Encyclopedia of World Music (Vol. 5); South Asia, the Indian subcontinent. Garland Publishing Inc. ISBN 9780824049461.
