= Nashenas =

Afghan musician (born 1935)

Nashenas ناشناس
- Born: Sadiq Fitrat Habibi; 28 December 1935 (age 90); Kandahar, Kingdom of Afghanistan
- Genre: Ghazals
- Occupation: Singer
- Years active: 1956–present
- Label: Various
- Website: https://nashenas.org

Dr. Mohammad Sadiq Fitrat, born Sadiq Fitrat Habibi (Pashto/Dari: صادق فطرت), known professionally as Nashenas (ناشناس), is one of the oldest surviving musicians from Afghanistan. His fame began in the late 1950s, and since then he has produced many albums consisting of Pashto, Persian, and Urdu songs. He is known as "the Afghan Saigal".

== Background and early life ==
Nashenas was born in Kandahar, Afghanistan to an ethnic Pashtun family. He belongs to the famous Habibi family who are Kakar by tribe. This is a religious family which descends from Habibullah Kakar, or Habibullah Akhundzada. His primary education was in Kandahar.

After his father was appointed by the National Bank of Karachi, he moved to British India where he lived without his mother. He encountered classical Indian music, which deeply moved and influenced him. Zakir Husain taught him calligraphy, Persian and Urdu.

While staying in Chaman, near the border of Afghanistan, he went to a school where he experienced an important moment in his musical awakening. Students were celebrating the establishment of their school. Kids used tables as drums while Nashenas sang. He was called to the principal's office. Thinking that he would get punished, he decided to deny that he was singing. On the contrary, he found that school appreciated his talents and encouraged him to perform. He received a medal and five volumes of religious texts.

== Career ==
In 1948, he returned to Afghanistan. Starting from 1953, he began singing on Afghan radio and became known under his pseudonym "Nashenas", which translates to "unknown". He used this pseudonym initially to hide his real identity. His family stressed to him the importance of religion as he hailed from the religious elite of the city of Kandahar, but according to Nashenas himself, his parents covertly approved and were proud of his singing talent.

In the early 1970s, Nashenas traveled to the Soviet Union where he obtained his doctorate in Pashto Literature from Moscow State University.

Since the early 1990s, he lives in London, England. He has never returned to Afghanistan since then.

Nashenas continues to be still popular in Afghanistan, including in the Pashto-speaking areas of Pakistan. He also performed a song written by Muhammad Iqbal. Nashenas has a following among musicians of the new generation as well, who are noted to imitate his style of singing. One of which is Sardar Ali Takkar, a Pashtun musician from Khyber Pakhtunkhwa, Pakistan.

In October 2023, Nashenas at the age of 88 made his first public performance in two decades at a venue in Beverwijk, The Netherlands.

== Discography ==
Note: This list is not comprehensive and does not include albums released in Afghanistan during the 1970s and 1980s. Due to the Soviet–Afghan War in the 1980s and the Taliban ban on music in late the 1990s, all his original music clips and videos from the 1970s and early 1980s have been destroyed. It is claimed that the ones being heard today are mostly copies of the original and the quality is not as good.

- Kharabat e -Moghaan
- Qandahar
- Sokhan-e-Zamana
- Nashinas Live In New York (DVD)
- Life Is a Heavy Burden: Ghazals & Poetry From Afghanistan
