= Mohammad Hussain Sarahang =

Afghan singer (1924–1983)

Mohammad-Hussain Sarāhang محمدحسین سرآهنگ
- Born: Mohammad-Hussain; 1924
- Origin: Kharabat, Kabul, Afghanistan
- Died: 1983 (aged 58–59)
- Genres: Khayal, Thumri, Tarana and Ghazal
- Occupation: Indian classical vocalist

Mohammad Hussain Sarāhang (Farsi: محمدحسین سرآهنگ - Sarāhang; 1924–1983) was an Afghan ghazal singer and an exponent of Indian classical music from Kabul, Afghanistan. He is popularly known with the honorific Ustad Sarahang and has been renowned as the "crown of Afghanistan’s music".

== Career and education ==
Mohammad-Hussain Sarahang (née Mohammad-Hussain) was born in 1924 in the Kharabat area of Kabul, an old district known for producing some of the country's greatest musicians. He was the second oldest son of musician Ghulam Hussain, who taught his son the basics of music. Sarahang studied Indian classical music in the Patiala style of singing under Ashiq Ali Khan.

After 16 years, Sarahang returned to Kabul at the age of 25 (c. 1949). Sarahang typically performed various genres of classical and semi-classical music including khayal, thumri, tarana and ghazal. He usually sang the ghazals of Amir Khusrow and Abul Ma'āni Bedil, famous poets who wrote in Persian, as he was a Bedil Shenās (Bedil Expert).

At the age of 25 (c. 1949), Sarahang participated in a festival of music held at Kabul's Pamir Cinema. Amongst the participants were Qasim and Bade Ghulam Ali Khan. At this festival, Sarahang was awarded a Gold Medal. A few years later, the government of Afghanistan awarded him the title of Sarāhang.

== Books ==
He wrote two books about classical music, Qānūn-e Tarab (The Law of Music) and Mūssīqī-e Rāg-hā (Music of Ragas). He has also created or composed several ragas including Hazra and Minamalee.

In addition he once also wrote articles for the Pashtun Ghag newspaper in Kabul.

== Honors ==
He earned the following titles and degrees from various music schools of India:

- Degrees of Master, Doctor and Professor of Music from Kalakendra School of Music, Calcutta
- Title of “Koh-e Beland” (High Mountain of Music) from Chandigarh School of Music, Chandigarh
- Title of “Sar Taj-e Musiqee” (Top Crown of Music) from Central School of Music, Allahabad
- Title of “Baba-e Musiqee” (The Father of Music) in his final concert in New Delhi, 1979
- Title of “Sher-e Musiqee” (Lion of Music) in his last performance in Allahabad, 1982

== Death ==
Upon his last trip to India in 1982, Sarahang fell ill and was hospitalized and ordered not to sing and to keep his talking to a minimum. Sarahang told his doctors he was feeling homesick and he would get better if he went back to Afghanistan. He returned to Afghanistan but disregarded the orders of his doctors and continued his performance. In 1983 he became ill again and was hospitalized in Kabul where he died from a heart attack.

The Afghan Ministry of Information and Culture has commemorated his death in later years on the date of June 12. It commemorated the 39th anniversary of his death on that day in 2021 and mentions his age was 65, which would imply that Sarahang was born circa 1917 and his death year was 1982.

His son Eltaf Hussain Sarahang, is also a ghazal performer.
