= Radio Afghanistan =

Public radio station of Afghanistan

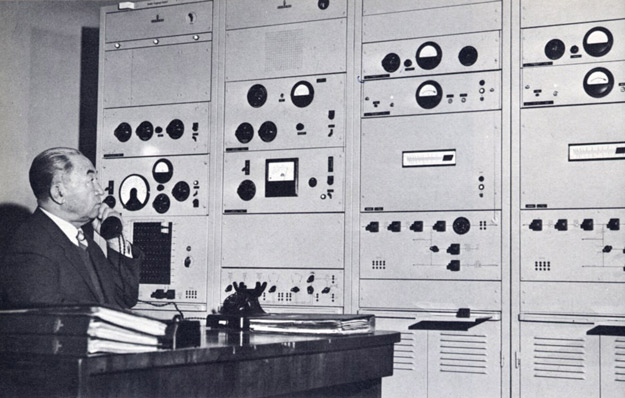
Central control panel at Radio Kabul transmitter in the 1950s. The transmitter could be heard as far as South Africa and Indonesia.

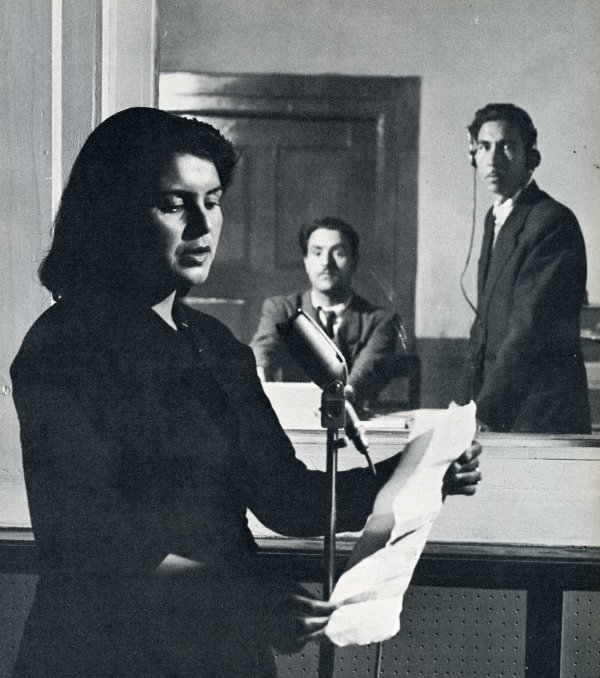
Radio Kabul studio in the 1960s

Radio Afghanistan, also known as Radio Kabul or Voice of Sharia, is the public radio station of Afghanistan, owned by Radio Television Afghanistan. The frequencies are 1107 kHz (AM) and 105.2 MHz (FM) for the Kabul area. The name Radio Kabul has been given to many different incarnations of the state-run radio station since the first radio transmitters were installed in Kabul in the 1920s.

== History ==
=== Origins ===
In 1925, a 200 watt Russian transmitter operating at AM 833 kHz was installed in Kabul Palace by King Amanullah Khan. This transmitter was destroyed in the 1929 uprising against the King. The transmitter was replaced in 1931 by the new King Mohammad Nadir Shah, and was upgraded in 1940 when a new 20 kilowatt transmitter was installed in its place, operating at 600 kHz. This is generally considered the official birth of Radio Kabul. Programmes were broadcast in Pashto, Dari Persian, Urdu, English and French.

=== Peacetime ===
As King Mohammad Zahir Shah tried to reinforce his goal of pan-Afghan unity, the station's name was changed in 1953 to the Afghan Broadcasting System, and again in 1960 to Radio Afghanistan. During times of relative peace in the 1960s and 70s, Radio Afghanistan hosted a whole generation of traditional and modern Afghan artists such as Ustad Mohammad Hussain Sarahang, Ustad Farida Mahwash, and Ustad Mohammad Hashem Cheshti. These master musicians were revered not only in Afghanistan but also in India and other countries.

=== Afghanistan conflict era ===
Throughout the modern history of Afghanistan, the radio has been controlled by (and renamed by) the currently ruling party or organization. The various changes of governments during the 1970s were all announced by the new leaders over the radio station. After the Soviet Union installed a puppet government in 1979, Radio Afghanistan was controlled by the Soviet-backed government and was used to rebroadcast pro-Soviet propaganda directly from the Soviet Union.

During the 1990s civil war, the radio station was damaged several times during the fighting, changing hands as different factions gained control of Kabul. In 1996, when the Taliban gained control of Kabul, the station's name was changed to the Voice of Sharia (Pashto: د شریعت غږ, romanized: Da Shariat Ghagh; Dari: صدای شریعت, romanized: Sadâ-e Shariat). As the Taliban consolidated their power throughout the country, the radio station was used to rally Taliban supporters and broadcast new edicts by the ruling mullahs. The Taliban banned music on the new station and ordered the destruction of the radio archives, which contained irreplaceable tapes of Radio Afghanistan music and political programs going back over forty years. The tapes were presumed to have been permanently lost, but in 2002, the BBC reported that, miraculously, the archives survived not only the Taliban but the utter destruction of the Radio Afghanistan building by American bombs during the U.S. invasion of Afghanistan in November 2001. The tapes were hidden by Mohammad Siddiq or "Mr. Computer", the person in charge of the archives, from the Taliban who destroyed what they thought were the archives but were instead actually Indian and Iranian music tapes. Siddiq claimed there were 50,000 radio tapes.

After the Taliban were driven from power, Radio Afghanistan resumed its music and political programs. It has been claimed that the first song broadcast by Radio Afghanistan following the fall of the Taliban was the famous patriotic song "Watan" (Homeland) by Abdul Wahab Madadi.

In 2021, following the Taliban takeover of Kabul, the Voice of Sharia branding was again reinstated, with the station signing in with the aforementioned name on 16 August 2021, the day following the takeover. Music broadcasts were again outlawed, being replaced by religious, patriotic and jihadist chants.

== See also ==
- Music of Afghanistan
- Mass media in Afghanistan
- Radio Television Afghanistan
- List of radio stations in Afghanistan
- Radio Shariat
