= Cinema of Afghanistan =

Cinema was introduced to Afghanistan at the beginning of the 20th century. Political troubles, such as the 1973 Afghan coup d'état and the Saur Revolution slowed the industry over the years; however, numerous Pashto and Dari films have been made both inside and outside Afghanistan throughout the 20th century. The cinema of Afghanistan entered a new phase in 2001, but has failed to recover to its popular pre-war status.

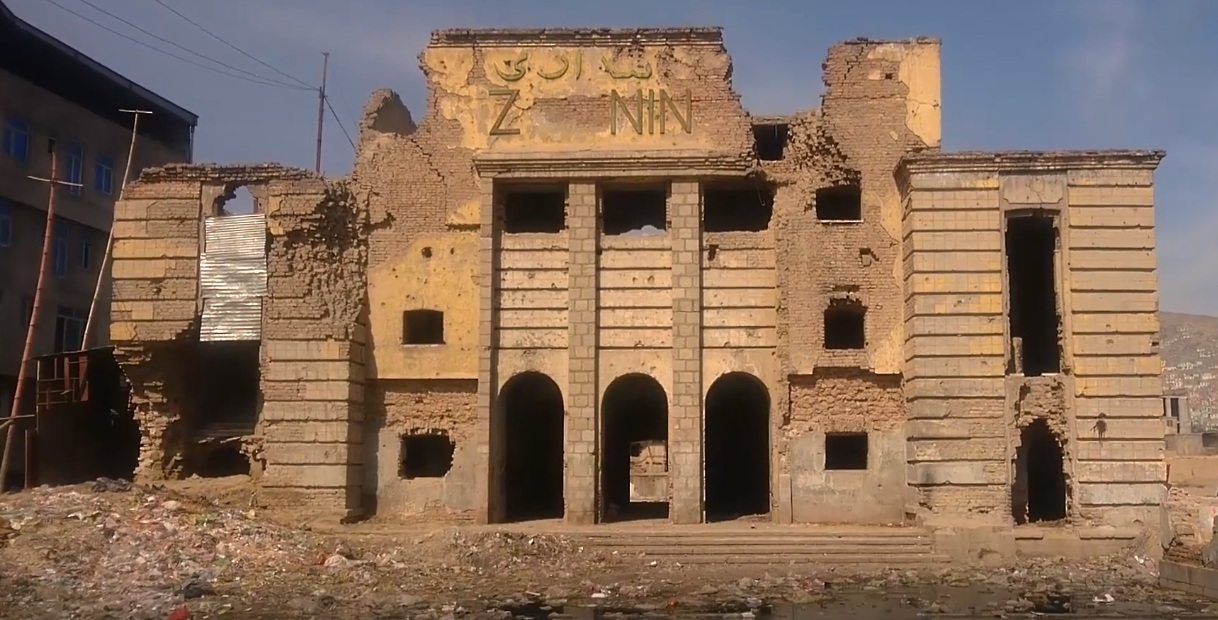
Ruins of Behzad Cinema in Kabul, The first movie theatre of Afghanistan which was established in 1934, closed many times.

== History ==
Emir Habibullah Khan, who reigned from 1901 to 1919, introduced film to Afghanistan, but in the royal court only. In 1923–24, the first projector or "magic box" or mageek lantan ('magic lantern') – showed the first silent film in Paghman to the public. The first Afghan film, Love and Friendship, was produced in 1946.

In Kabul, the Behzad Cinema became the first theatre in Afghanistan, and Cinema Park was also among the earliest to have been built in the 1950s. Among the most prominent cinemas in Kabul before the 1990s were the Pamir, Ariana, Aryob, Barikot and Baharestan cinemas.

When the Afghan Film Organization was established in 1968, it produced documentaries and news films highlighting the official meetings and conferences of the government. All these films were shown in cinemas before feature films, which were usually from India. The first feature film made in Kabul by Afghan Film using Afghan artists was Like Eagles (1964) directed by Faiz Khairzada. Another claim to first Afghan feature is Afghan Film's three-part The Times (1970), which comprised Smugglers, Suitors and Friday Night. Other films from this period, sometimes produced by other film companies and often with Russian-trained directors, included Difficult Days/Rozhai Dushwar (1974),The Statues are Laughing/Mujasemeha Mekhandad (1976), and Village Tunes. All of these films were shot in black and white. Film artists of this era included Toryali Shafaq, Khan Aqa Soroor, Rafeeq Saadiq, Azizullah Hadaf, Mashal Honaryar and Parvin Sanatgar.

The first color films produced by Afghan Film in the early 1980s, often propaganda, included Run Away/Farar (1984), Saboor Soldier/Saboor Sarbaaz (1984), 1986's Love Epic/Hamaseh Ishq (1986), 'Ash' (Khakestar), 'Last Wishes' (Akharin Arezo) and The Immigrant Birds/Pardehaje Mohajer (1987). These films, usually shown only in urban areas, became popular.

During the late 1960s and 1970s Soviet aid included cultural training and scholarships for students interested in studying film. However, since Afghanistan had no film academy, future filmmakers had to apprentice on the job. The three civil wars of the 1990s were not conducive to creative work and many people working in the Afghan film industry escaped to Iran or Pakistan, where they were able to make videos for NGOs. The new government banned production of films in 1993.

When the Taliban took power in 1996, cinemas were attacked and many films were burnt. The Taliban forbade the viewing of television and films and cinemas were closed, either becoming tea shops or restaurants or falling into a state of disrepair. Habibullah Ali of Afghan Film hid thousands of films, buried underground or in hidden rooms, to prevent their destruction by the Taliban. Teardrops was the first post-Taliban film in 2002, and the first film since Oruj in 1990. On November 19, 2001, Bakhtar was the first cinema to re-open its doors, where thousands of people entered that day.

=== Afghan Film Organization ===
Afghan Film also known as Afghan Film Organization (AFO) were former Afghanistan's state-run film company. It was established in 1968 and the last president was Sahraa Karimi, the first female head of the organisation.

=== Reemergence ===
Since 2001, the cinema of Afghanistan has slowly started to reemerge from a lengthy period of silence. Before the September 11th attacks, Afghanistan-based Iranian director Mohsen Makhmalbaf attracted world attention to Afghanistan with Kandahar (2001). The film brought the cinema of Afghanistan to the Cannes film festival for the first time in history. Later Samira Makhmalbaf, Siddiq Barmak, Razi Mohebi, Horace Shansab, Yassamin Maleknasr and Abolfazl Jalili made a significant contribution to Dari (Persian) cinema in Afghanistan.

Barmak's first Persian/Pashto film Osama (2003) won several awards at film festivals in Cannes and London. Barmak is also director of the Afghan Children Education Movement (ACEM), an association that promotes literacy, culture and the arts, founded by Iranian film director Mohsen Makhmalbaf. The school trains actors and directors for the emerging cinema of Afghanistan. In 2006 Afghanistan joined the Central Asian and Southern Caucasus Film Festivals Confederation.

In the 1970s and 1980s, it was not difficult to get women to act in films. The war and the Taliban rule changed the situation, but they now are increasingly represented in the cinema of Afghanistan. Actresses like Leena Alam, Amina Jafari, Saba Sahar (now also a director) and Marina Gulbahari have emerged over the last decade.

Apart from cinema in Persian, Pashto cinema is also flourishing in Afghanistan. Several Pashto language films have been made since the fall of the Taliban, including some by foreigners like Good Morning Afghanistan (2003) by Camilla Nielsson.

Kabullywood (2017) is a comedy-drama directed by Louis Meunier that was shot entirely in Kabul. As part of the movie, Meunier crowdfunded the renovation of the once-prosperous Aryub Cinema in the city, but without it opening as planned.

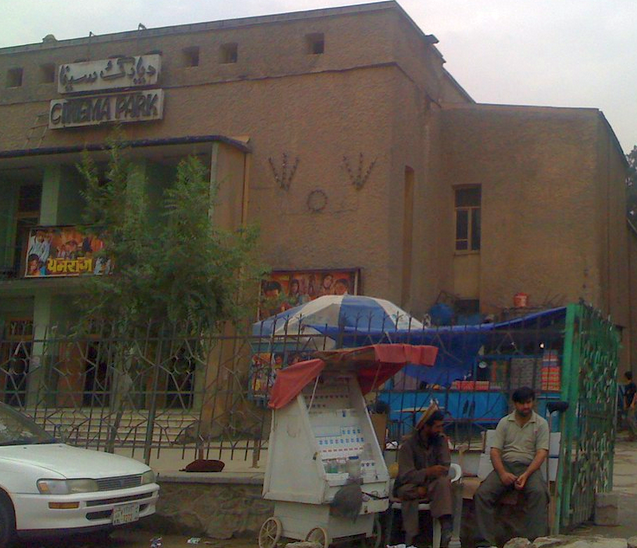
The old Park Cinema (Cīnemā Pārk), demolished in 2020

The public cinema industry has not managed to recover, with many cinemas in Kabul either falling into disrepair or attracting low numbers of customers. The issue reached national attention at the end of 2020 when the municipality decided to demolish the neglected but historic Cinema Park, sparking protests by activists.

=== B-movies ===
There are a number of films produced both inside and outside Afghanistan that are considered B-movies due to the low production quality and audience reach. These films are targeted mainly at an Afghan audience and rarely make it to the non-Afghan audiences or the international film festivals.

== Outside Afghanistan ==
Many filmmakers fled the country due to war, and began to make films outside Afghanistan. Some films made outside Afghanistan include the Shirin Gul-o-Shir Agha trilogy made in Russia, Foreign Land, Loori, Sheraghai Daghalbaaz, In the Wrong Hands (2002), Shade of Fire, Asheyana and Khana Badosh in the UK, Do Atash and Waris in the Netherlands, 3 Friends and Al Qarem (2006) in the United States, Shekast in Pakistan, Aftaab e Bighroob in Tajikistan, Kidnapping in Germany, and Gridami in Italy. Most notable of all were Academy Award submission FireDancer (2002) and French-based film Earth and Ashes (2004).

== Foreign films ==
Many foreign films were made within Afghanistan, including Indian films like Feroz Khan's Dharmatma (1975) and Khuda Gawah (1992), and the American film The Beast (1988).

Some films relating to Afghanistan include Rambo III (1988), the British film In This World (2002), Escape From Taliban (2003) and Kabul Express (2006). The Hollywood-produced The Kite Runner (2007) earned a nomination in the 80th Academy Awards for Best Original Score.

In the mid-20th century one of the most popular foreign films that ran in Kabul's cinemas was the American epic Gone with the Wind (1939).

== Notable individuals ==
Writers/Directors/Producers

- Mir Hamza Shinwari
- Engineer Ahmed Latif
- Roya Sadat
- Sahraa Karimi
- Saeed Orokzai
- Atiq Rahimi
- Abdul Wahid Nazari
- Siddiq Barmak
- Saba Sahar (Afghanistan's first female film director)
- Barmak Akram, Kabuli Kid - Wajma
- Salim Shaheen - Nominated for Cannes Film Festival

== Superstars ==
=== Actors ===
- Nassir Aziz
- Ibrahim Tughyan
- Saeed Orokzai
- Faqir Nabi
- Youssof Kohzad
- Saboor Toofan
- Salam Sangi
- Mir Hamza Shinwari
- Salim Shaheen
- Haji Kamran
- Mamnoon Maqsoodi

=== Actresses ===
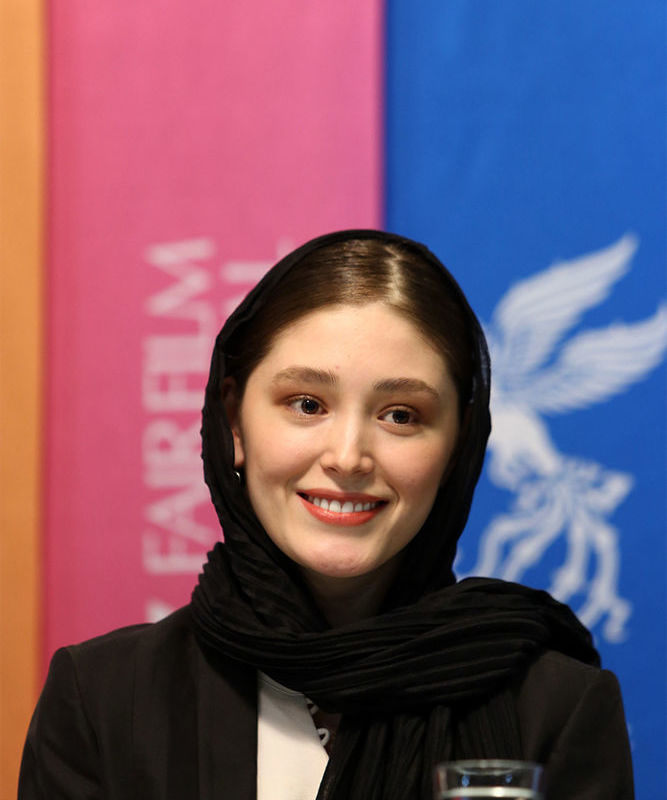
Fereshteh Hosseini is the first and only Afghan descent actress to win the Best Actress award at the Marrakech International Film Festival.

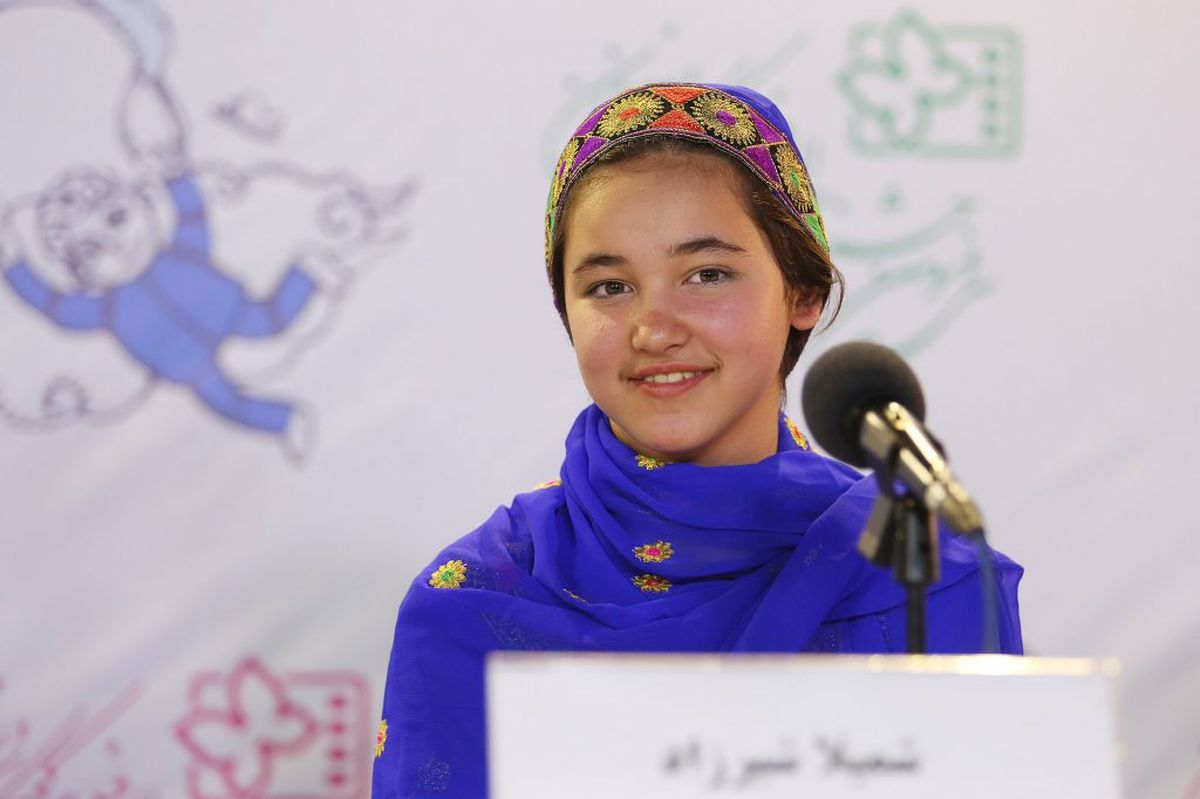
Shamila Shirzad is the first Afghan actress to win any award at the Fajr Film Festival.

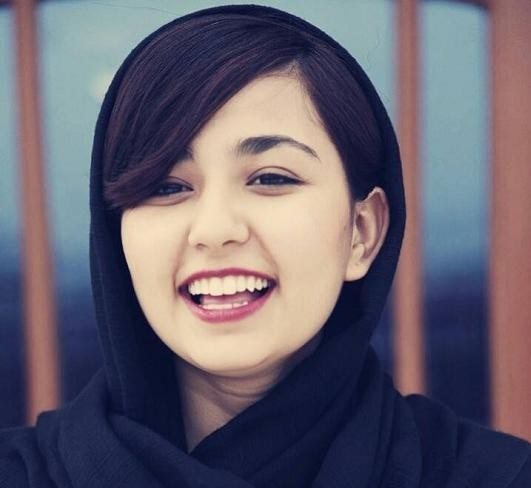
Hasiba Ebrahimi is the first Afghan actress to be nominated for Best Actress at the Fajr Film Festival.

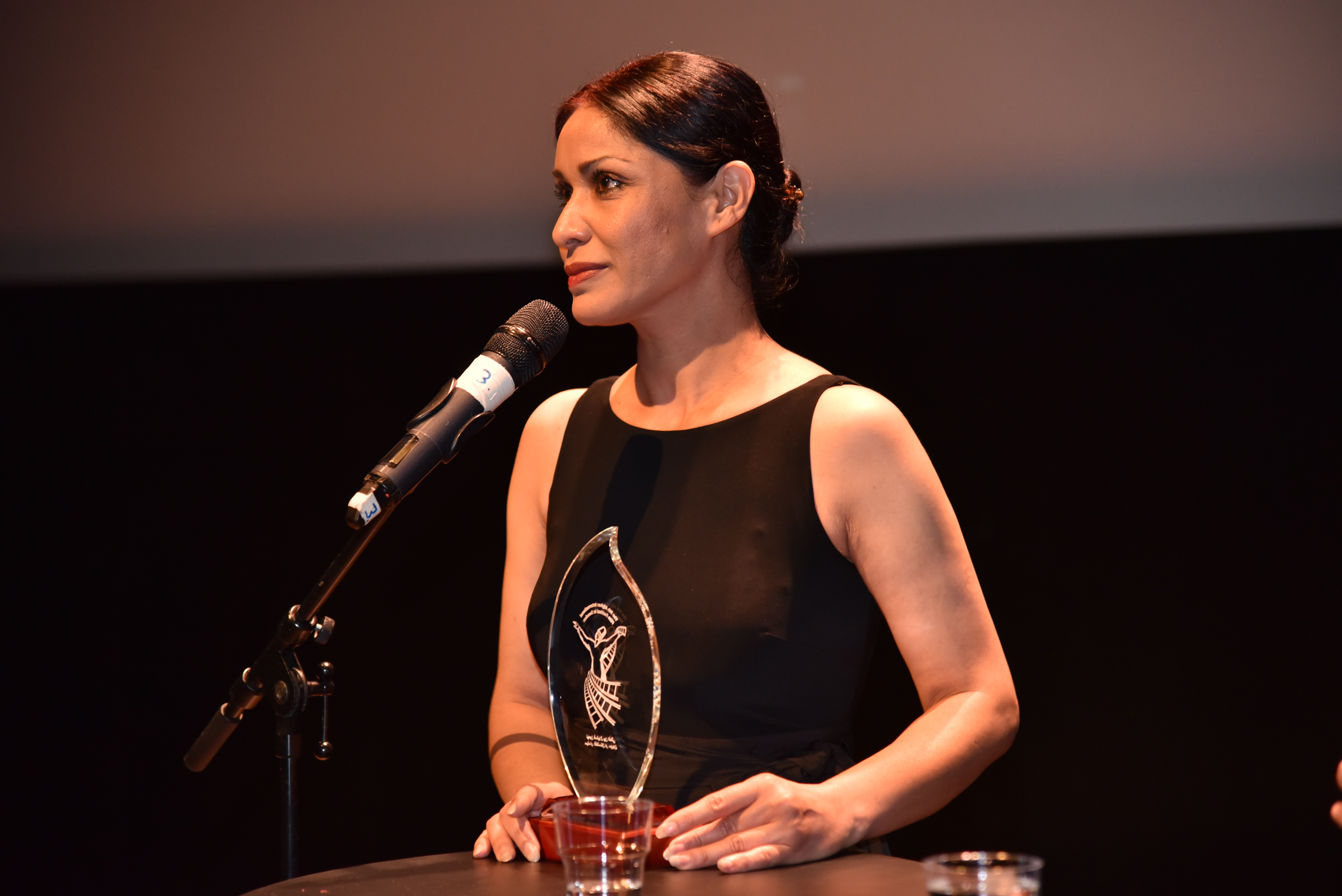
Leena Alam is the first and only Afghan actress to be nominated for Best Actress at the Seoul International Drama Awards.

- Marina Golbahari
- Leena Alam
- Fereshteh Hosseini
- Shamila Shirzad
- Hasiba Ebrahimi
- Yasamin Yarmal
- Sahraa Karimi
- Adela Adem

== Notable films ==
These films have had either theatrical distribution or won awards at prestigious film festivals. They also appear on IMDb's Most popular list.

- Kandahar (2001) - 20+ Film festivals
- Osama (2003) Winner of Golden Globes
- Earth and Ashes (2004)
- Zolykha's Secret (2006)
- Kabuli Kid (2008)
- Opium War (2008)
- Buzkashi Boys (2012)- Oscar nominee
- The Black Tulip (2010)
- The Patience Stone (2012)
- Madrasa (2013)
- Wajma (2013), an Afghan Love Story
- A Few Cubic Meters of Love (2014)
- Mina Walking (2015)
- A Letter to the President (2017)
- Kabullywood (2017)
- Black Kite (2017)
- Why? (2019)

=== Feature films ===
Zolykha's Secret (2007; Rahze Zolykha in Persian) is also among the first feature films from post-Taliban Afghanistan, which played to full houses at major film festivals. The film's director, Horace Ahmad Shansab, trained young Afghan filmmakers and made the film entirely on location in Afghanistan.

Emaan (2010) was screened at Reading Cinemas in Australia. This is the first time an Afghan film has been screened at Reading. It was the winner of 2011 South Asian Film Festival in Canberra for Best Story and Best Film.

Notable short films include No Woman (2015) and We are postmodern.

=== Documentary films ===
Documentaries have been made in Afghanistan since the Taliban, most notably 16 Days in Afghanistan by Mithaq Kazimi and Postcards from Tora Bora by Wazhmah Osman. The Boy who Plays on the Buddhas of Bamiyan, a documentary shot by award-winning British director Phil Grabsky was released in 2001 and went on to win awards worldwide. There is also a monthly magazine, Theme, that is published by Afghan Cinema Club that focuses on Afghan and international cinema.

=== Highest grossing ===
The highest grossing Afghan film is Osama, earning $3,800,000 worldwide from a budget of only $46,000. The film was very well received by the Western cinematic world. It gathered a rating of 96% based on 100 reviews collected by Rotten Tomatoes.

== See also ==
- List of Afghan films
- List of Afghan submissions for the Academy Award for Best Foreign Language Film
- Cinema of Central Asia
- Cinema of the world
