= List of Afghan films =

A list of notable films produced in Afghanistan.

The highest grossing Afghan film as of 2018 is Osama (2003) with over $3,800,000 from a budget of only $46,000.

== 1930s–1970s ==
Title	Director	Cast	Genre	Notes
1939
Laila Majnoon	Mir Hamza Shinwari	Rafiqe Ghaznawi, Habib Jan	Drama	
1960
New ray	Mir Hamza Shinwari			
1964
Like An Eagle	Faiz Mohammad Khairzada	Najia Hamidi, Saeed Bibi Naqi, Wali Ahmad Khairkhowah, Zahir Howaida		
1963
Tiga	Mir Hamza Shinwari	Umer Daraz		
1968
Roz Garan			Drama	Music Composition: Hangama, Ustad Arman & Ustad Nangyalai
1969
Talabgar	Khaliq Alil	Khan Aqa Sarwari, Rasol Maimuna, Rafiq Sadeq, Habiba Askar	Black comedy, drama	Music Group: Rukhshana, Ustad Nangyalai
1970
Yousuf Khan aw Sherbano	Aziz Shamim	Badar Munir, Yasmin Khan, Saqi	Drama	IMDb
Sandar Gharai		Badar Munir, Yasmin Khan, Naemat Sarhadi		
Kala Khazan Kala Bahar	Jamil Ahmad	Aman		
1971
Andarz e Mother	Khaliq Alil	Mahbobah Jabbari, Mohammad Nazir, Ghazal Saeed	Drama	
1972
Aalaqa Ghair	Khaliq Alil			
1974
Rabia Balkhi,	Khaliq Alil, Toryali Shafaq, Abdullah Shadan, Mohamed Nazir, Daoud Farani		Drama	
Roz Hai Dushwar	Wali Latifi	Wali Latifi, Hamid Jalil, Shazia, Farida	Drama	
1975
Mojasema Ha May Khandand	Eng. Latif Ahmadi	Zakia Kohzad, Youssof Kohzad, Abdullah Khamosh, Mohammad Jan Goran		
1978
Siamoi wa Jallali	Abbas Shaban	Faqeer Nabi		
1979
Mardara Qawl Ast	Saeed Orokzai	Saeed Orokzai, Adela Adim, Wali Talash, Amin Rahimi	Romance, Drama	

== 1980s ==
Title	Director	Cast	Genre	Notes
1980
Shekaste Mahasera	Faqeer Nabi	Nassir Aziz, Qadir Farrukh, Salam Sangi, Azizullah Hadaf, Asad Tajzai, Shakila, Faqeer Nabi		
Dehkada ha Bidar Maishawand	Khaliq Alil	Nassir Aziz, Sahera Hazem, Qadir Farrukh, Azizullah Hadaf		
Khakestar	Saeed Orokzai	Abdullah Samadi, Homa Mostamandi, Amin Rahimi	drama, crime	
Aktare Maskhara	Eng. Latif Ahmadi	Nassir Aziz, Faqeer Nabi, Ibrahim Tughyan, Baseera, Khatera	black comedy	
1981
Gunah	Eng. Latif Ahmadi	Salam Sangi		
Janayat Karan	Toryali Shafaq			
Ghulam Ishq	Toryali Shafaq			
Khana 555				
Gharatgara	Abbas Shaban			
1982
Faraar	Eng. Latif Ahmadi	Nassir Aziz, Fareema, Shakila, Mahrefat Shah, Asadullah Aram, Anwar Rezaye, Khorshid		
1983
Tabistan Garm Kabul	Ali Khamraev, Wali Latifi			
1984
Hamasa e Ishq	Eng. Latif Ahmadi	Asadullah Aram, Qader Farukh, Sabera, Arash, Habib Zelgai, Yasamin Yarmal		
1985
Saboore Sarbaz	Eng. Latif Ahmadi	Nassir Aziz, Saboor Toofan, Ibrahim Tughyan, Jawansher Haidari	war, drama	
Roya		Fahim Sadozai, Hashmat Khan		
1986
Parenda haye Mahajir	Eng. Latif Ahmadi	Nassir Aziz, Nehmat Arash, Asadullah Aram, Qadir Farrukh, Adela Adim		
Begana	Barmak	Salam Sangi, Adela Adim, Ibrahim Tughyan, Zaher Garandi, Ghulam Baloch, Hamayon Paeiz		
1987
Parinda ha e Mohajir	Eng. Latif Ahmadi			
1988
De Kondai Zoi		Mamnoon Maqsoodi		
1989
Dukhter baa perahan safid				
Baabaa	Jawansher Haidari	Salam Sangi, Asadullah Aram, Wali Talash, Naheed, Akram Khurami		

== 1990s–2010s ==
Title	Director	Cast	Genre	Notes
1990
Gumashtan	Engineer Ahmed Latif	Saboor Toofan, Qader Faroskh, Nemat Arash, Habib Zilgai, Lina		
Sayeh	Nacir Alqas	Yasamin Yarmal		
Uruj	Siddiq Barmak			
2000
In Foreign Land	Hafiz Asefi	Salam Sangi, Leena Alam		
2003
Osama	Siddiq Barmak	Marina Golbahari, Arif Herati, Zubaida Sahar, Khwaja Nader		
2004
Earth and Ashes	Atiq Rahimi			Screened at the 2004 Cannes Film Festival
2006
Zolykha's Secret	Horace Shansab	Hamida Refah, Zubaida Sahar, Gholam Farouq Baraki, Marina Golbahari	Mystery, Horror, Drama	Screened at the Palm Springs International Film Society
2008
16 Days in Afghanistan	Anwar Hajher			co-production by United States and India
Kabuli Kid	Barmak Akram	Haji Gul Aser, Leena Alam, Valéry Schatz, Amélie Glenn	Drama	Produced in France; screened at the 65th Venice International Film Festival
Opium War	Siddiq Barmak	Peter Bussian, Marina Golbahari, Joe Suba, Fawad Samani	Black comedy	Opened at the Rome Film Festival, where it won the Golden Marc'Aurelio Critics' Award for Best Film
2012
Buzkashi Boys	Sam French	Fawad Mohammadi, Jawanmard Paiz, Wali Talash	Drama/Action short film	85th Academy Awards – Nominated for: Best Live Action Short Film
Buz-e-Chini	Abbas Ali	Hussain Ali Yousafi	Animated	Dedicated to Hussain Ali Yousafi as it was released after his assassination
2013
Wajma	Barmak Akram	Wazhma Bahar, Mustafa Abdulsatar, Haji Gul Aser, Breshna Bahar	Drama	Nominated to Sundance
2014
A Few Cubic Meters of Love	Jamshid Mahmoudi	Hasiba Ebrahimi	Romance	
Korengal	Sebastian Junger		Documentary	
The Hornet's Nest	David Salzberg, Christian Tureaud		Documentary	
2015
No Woman	Yama Rauf	Noor Jamal, Habibullah Nikzad	Experimental/Arthouse short film	
2017
Black Kite		Leena Alam, Haji Gul Aser|		
A Letter to the President		Leena Alam, Mamnoon Maqsoodi|		
Faceless	Ali Akbar Kamal	Humayoon Shams Khan, Rahmatullah Khostai, Farahnaz Nawab	Action	First Afghan superhero film
2019
Jirga	Benjamin Gilmour	Amir Shah Talash, Sam Smith, Sher Alam Miskeen Ustad	Drama film	Toronto Film Festival –

== See also ==
- Cinema of Afghanistan
- List of Afghan submissions for the Academy Award for Best Foreign Language Film
- Cinema of Central Asia
