= List of Afghan submissions for the Academy Award for Best International Feature Film =

Best International Feature Film submissions from Afghanistan

Highlights
- Debut: 2002
- Submissions: 14
- Nominations: none
- Oscar winners: none

Afghanistan has submitted films for the Academy Award for Best International Feature Film (Note: The category was previously named the Academy Award for Best Foreign Language Film, but this was changed to the Academy Award for Best International Feature Film in April 2019, after the Academy deemed the word "Foreign" to be outdated.) since 2002. The award is handed out annually by the United States Academy of Motion Picture Arts and Sciences to a feature-length motion picture produced outside the United States that contains primarily non-English dialogue. It was not created until the 1956 Academy Awards, in which a competitive Academy Award of Merit, known as the Best Foreign Language Film Award, was created for non-English speaking films, and has been given annually since.

The country started to submit films for the category after the fall of the Taliban regime in 2001, participating regularly until the end of the American occupation and the subsequent Taliban recapture of power in 2021.

As of 2026, Afghanistan has submitted fourteen films, but none of them were nominated.

== Submissions ==
The Academy of Motion Picture Arts and Sciences has invited the film industries of various countries to submit their best film for the Academy Award for Best International Feature Film since 1956. The International Feature Film Committee oversees the process and reviews all the submitted films. Following this, they vote via secret ballot to determine the five nominees for the award.

FireDancer (2002) was Afghanistan's first-ever submission. The film, about the Afghan-American diaspora in New York City, was filmed primarily in English with some scenes in Dari. In order to fulfill AMPAS requirements, the film held screenings in two venues in Kabul: a newly reopened cinema and a stadium that was previously used by the Taliban for executions. The print used for the Afghan screenings as well as that submitted to the academy was dubbed entirely into Dari. The film's writer-director Jawed Wassel, an Afghan Americans who had received asylum in the United States in the 1980s, was brutally murdered while the film was in post-production. The film's producer Nathan Powell pleaded guilty to the crime.

Osama (2003), follows a young girl forced to pose as a boy in order to work and support her family under the brutal Taliban regime. It was considered an early favorite for a nomination after winning the Golden Globe Award for Best Foreign Language Film, but it ultimately failed to be nominated.

In 2009, a British documentary filmed in Afghanistan in languages native to Afghanistan, Afghan Star, was selected to represent the United Kingdom.

Most of the films are primary in Dari, with the exception of The Patience Stone (2012), which was in Persian. Below is a list of the films that have been submitted by Afghanistan for review by the academy for the award by year and the respective Academy Awards ceremony.

| Year (Ceremony) | Film title used in nomination | Original title | Language(s) | Director(s) | Result |
|---|---|---|---|---|---|
| 2002 (75th) | FireDancer | | Dari, English | Jawed Wassel | Not nominated |
| 2003 (76th) | Osama | أسامة | Dari | Siddiq Barmak | Not nominated |
| 2004 (77th) | Earth and Ashes | خاکستر و خاک | Dari, Pashto | Atiq Rahimi | Not nominated |
| 2008 (81st) | Opium War | جنگ تریاک | Dari, English | Siddiq Barmak | Not nominated |
| 2009 (82nd) | 16 Days in Afghanistan | | Pashto, English, Dari | Anwar Hajher | Not on the final list |
| 2010 (83rd) | The Black Tulip | لاله سیاه | Dari, Pashto, English, Arabic, Italian | Sonia Nassery Cole | Not nominated |
| 2012 (85th) | The Patience Stone | سنگ صبور | Persian | Atiq Rahimi | Not nominated |
| 2013 (86th) | Wajma (An Afghan Love Story) | وژمه | Dari | Barmak Akram | Not nominated |
| 2014 (87th) | A Few Cubic Meters of Love | چند متر مکعب عشق | Farsi, Dari | Jamshid Mahmoudi | Not nominated |
| 2015 (88th) | Utopia | آرمان شهر | English, Dari, Hindi | Hassan Nazer | Disqualified |
| 2016 (89th) | Parting | رفتن | Dari, Farsi | Navid Mahmoudi | Not on the final list |
| 2017 (90th) | A Letter to the President | نامه‌ای به رییس‌جمهور | Dari | Roya Sadat | Not nominated |
| 2018 (91st) | Rona, Azim's Mother | رونا مادر عظیم | Dari, Farsi | Jamshid Mahmoudi | Not nominated |
| 2019 (92nd) | Hava, Maryam, Ayesha | حوا، مریم، عایشه | Dari | Sahraa Karimi | Disqualified |

== See also ==
- Cinema of Afghanistan
- List of Afghan films
- Cinema of Central Asia
- List of Academy Award winners and nominees for Best International Feature Film
- List of Academy Award-winning foreign language films
