= Askhat Kuchinchirekov =

Kazakhstani film director, screenwriter and actor

- Асхат Күшіншіреков
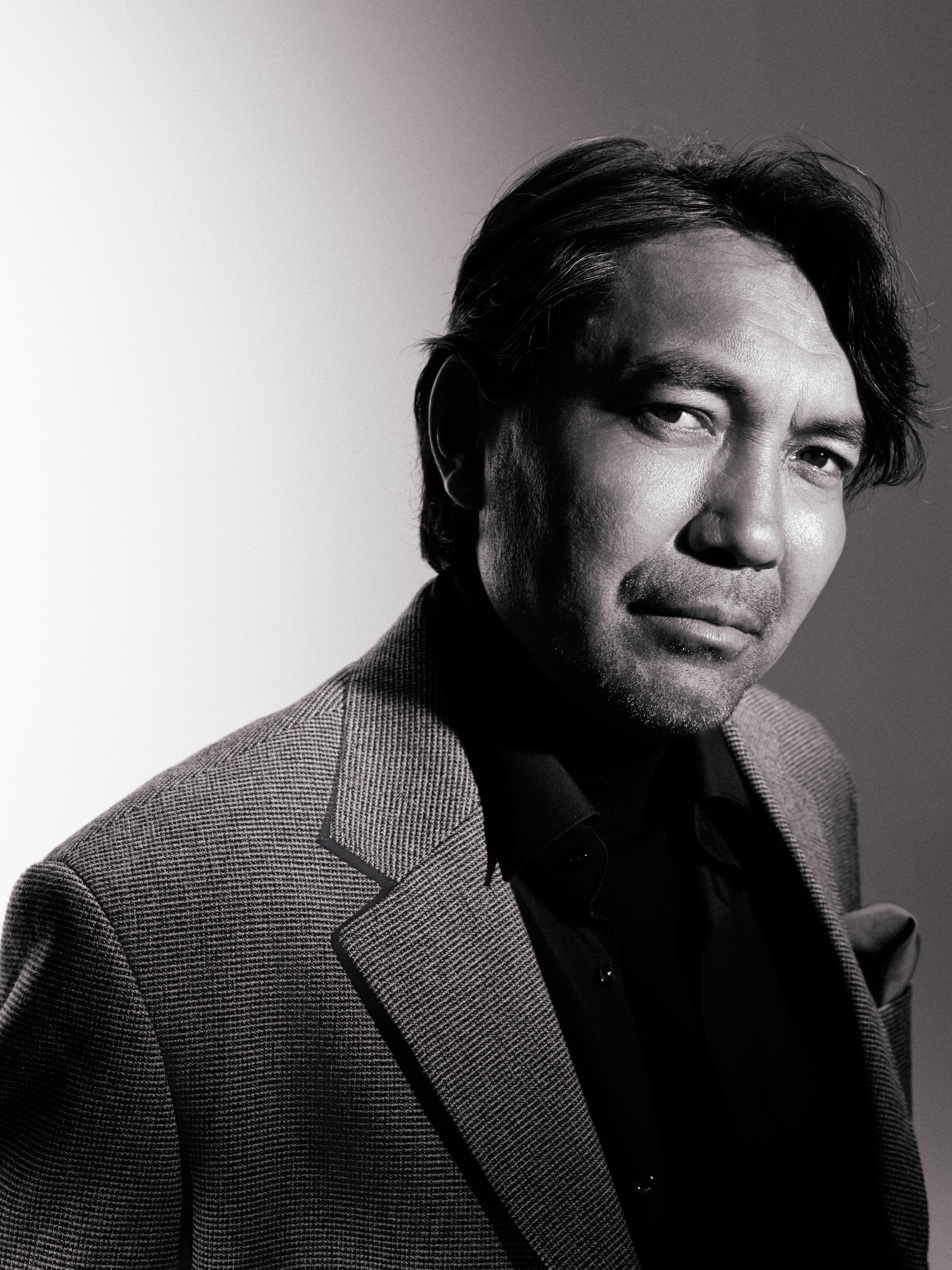
- Born: April 3, 1982 (age 44); Blagoveshchenka, Altai Krai, Soviet Union
- Occupations: Film director; screenwriter; actor
- Years active: 2003–present

Askhat Kuchinchirekov (Kazakh: Асхат Күшіншіреков; born 3 April 1982) is a Kazakhstani film director, screenwriter, and actor. He is best known internationally for his leading role in Sergey Dvortsevoy's Tulpan (2008), which won the top prize in the Un Certain Regard section at the 61st Cannes Film Festival. His feature directorial debut, Bauryna Salu (2023), was selected as Kazakhstan's official submission for the Academy Award for Best International Feature Film at the 97th Academy Awards.

== Biography and career ==
Askhat Kuchinchirekov was born on 3 April 1982. He later enrolled at the Kazakh National Academy of Arts named after Temirbek Zhurgenov, where he studied film direction.

=== Acting career ===
While still a student at the academy, Kuchinchirekov was cast in the lead role of Tulpan (2008), directed by Sergey Dvortsevoy. The film, in which he plays Asa, a young man recently discharged from the Russian Navy who attempts to build a life as a shepherd on the Kazakh steppe, premiered in the Un Certain Regard section of the 2008 Cannes Film Festival, where it won the top prize. Variety described the film as winning the top prize in Cannes' Un Certain Regard sidebar, noting its organic naturalism and documentary realism. The Hollywood Reporter described the film as "polished, funny and utterly charming."

From 2014 to 2018, Kuchinchirekov worked as an assistant director alongside Dvortsevoy. In 2018, he appeared in Dvortsevoy's follow-up feature Ayka, which competed in the main competition at the 71st Cannes Film Festival and was shortlisted for the Academy Award for Best International Feature Film.

=== Directing career ===
In 2013, Kuchinchirekov made his directorial debut with the short film Gas Is Over (Закончился бензин), for which he also served as screenwriter and producer. The film won the Best Short Film award in the Asia/Africa category at the Dubai International Film Festival. The short also screened in competition at the Tampere Film Festival.

His feature directorial debut, Bauryna Salu (2023), draws on his own childhood experience of being raised by his grandparents in accordance with the traditional Kazakh custom of the same name, a nomadic practice in which a family's firstborn child is entrusted to grandparents for upbringing. The film had its world premiere in the New Directors sidebar of the San Sebastián International Film Festival in 2023.

Variety praised the film's approach, writing that it demonstrates a stunning commitment to cinematic realism, and described it as "a rare, naturalistic gem." Afghan director Siddiq Barmak, known for Osama, joined the film as executive producer.

In September 2024, Bauryna Salu was officially selected as Kazakhstan's submission for the Academy Award for Best International Feature Film at the 97th Academy Awards. The film was also named best film at Kazakhstan's national film awards, the Tulpar Awards.

== Filmography ==
Year	Title	Role	Notes
2008	Tulpan	Actor (lead role as Asa)	Dir. Sergey Dvortsevoy; Un Certain Regard Prize, 61st Cannes Film Festival
2013	Gas Is Over (short)	Director, screenwriter, producer	Winner, Best Asia/Africa Short, Dubai International Film Festival
2018	Ayka	Actor; assistant director	Dir. Sergey Dvortsevoy; main competition, 71st Cannes Film Festival
2023	Bauryna Salu	Director, screenwriter, producer	Kazakhstan's submission, 97th Academy Awards

== Awards and nominations ==
=== As director ===
Year	Award / Festival	Film	Result
2013	Dubai International Film Festival — Best Asia/Africa Short Film	Gas Is Over	Won
2023	Asia Pacific Screen Awards — Best Youth Film	Bauryna Salu	Won
2023	San Sebastián International Film Festival — New Directors section	Bauryna Salu	Selected
2024	Tulpar National Film Award — Best Film	Bauryna Salu	Won
2024	97th Academy Awards — Best International Feature Film (Kazakhstan submission)	Bauryna Salu	Submitted
2024	goEast Film Festival — Special Prize (ZDF)	Bauryna Salu	Won
2024	Fajr International Film Festival — Special Jury Prize	Bauryna Salu	Won
2024	Bishkek International Film Festival — Best Director	Bauryna Salu	Won
2024	Baku International Film Festival — Best Film	Bauryna Salu	Won
2024	Asia World Film Festival — Best Cinematography	Bauryna Salu	Won
2025	Ischia International Film Festival — Best Film	Bauryna Salu	Won

=== As actor ===
Year	Award	Film	Result
2008	Nika Award — Discovery of the Year	Tulpan	Nominated
2009	Asian Film Awards — Best New Performer	Tulpan	Nominated
