= Hasiba Ebrahimi =

Afghan actress (born 1996)

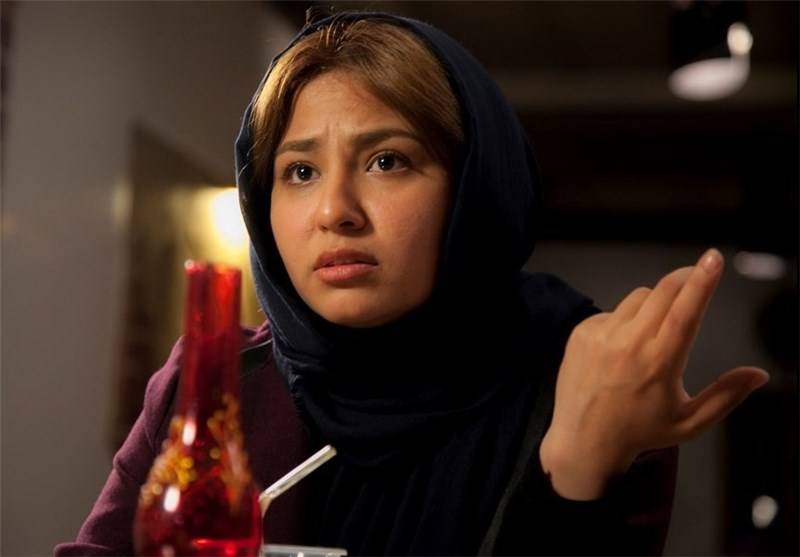
- Born: December 21, 1996 (age 29); Afghanistan
- Citizenship: Iran
- Occupation: Actress
- Years active: 2014–present

Hasiba Ebrahimi (Dari: حسیبا ابراهیمی; born December 21, 1996) is an Afghan actress. She is best known for her role as Marvena in A Few Cubic Meters of Love (2014) for which she earned a Crystal Simorgh for Best Actress nomination. She became the first Afghan to be nominated for Best Actress at the Fajr Film Festival. (Iran's equivalent of the Oscars).

== Early life and career ==
Hasiba Ebrahimi was born on December 21, 1996, in Afghanistan to a Shia Hazara family. She and her family were forced to migrate to Iran due to the war in Afghanistan. Hasiba's hard life began after immigrating to Iran and living in Shush, she initially could not attend school because she did not have an identity card and only had a passport. By registering in the Children's Support Society, she was able to study until the fifth grade. She had to attend her studies in between work. she helped with the flower-making work at home as well as studying. she continued until she finished her ninth grade, and then she could not continue her education due to moving her residence to Tehran.

== Personal life ==
She was born to a Hazara family in Afghanistan and later immigrate to Iran due to civil war in Afghanistan. Ebrahimi speaks Dari, Persian, and English.

== Filmography ==
=== Film ===
| Year | Title | Role | Director | Notes | Ref(s) |
|---|---|---|---|---|---|
| 2014 | A Few Cubic Meters of Love | Marvena | Jamshid Mahmoudi | Selected as the Afghan entry for the Best Foreign Language Film at the 87th Academy Awards | |
| 2017 | Lina | Maryam | Ramin Rasouli | | |
| 2019 | Hava, Maryam, Ayesha | Ayesha | Sahraa Karimi | Selected as the Afghan entry for the Best Foreign Language Film at the 92nd Academy Awards | |
| 2020 | When Pomegranates Howl | The Bride | Granaz Moussavi | Selected as the Australian entry for the Best Foreign Language Film at the 94th Academy Awards | |
| 2021 | Habeeb | The Journalist | Jennifer Alphonse | Short film | |
| 2022 | Shabnam | Shabnam | Zabiullah Askari | Short film | |
| TBA | Loteria | | Ali Atshani | Post-production | |

== Awards and nominations ==
| Award | Year | Category | Nominated Work | Result | Ref. |
|---|---|---|---|---|---|
| Asian World Film Festival | 2019 | Best Actress | Hava, Maryam, Ayesha | Won | |
| Fajr Film Festival | 2014 | Best Actress in a Leading Role | A Few Cubic Meters of Love | Nominated | |
