= Ariana Cinema =

Movie theatre in Kabul, Afghanistan

- سینما آریانا
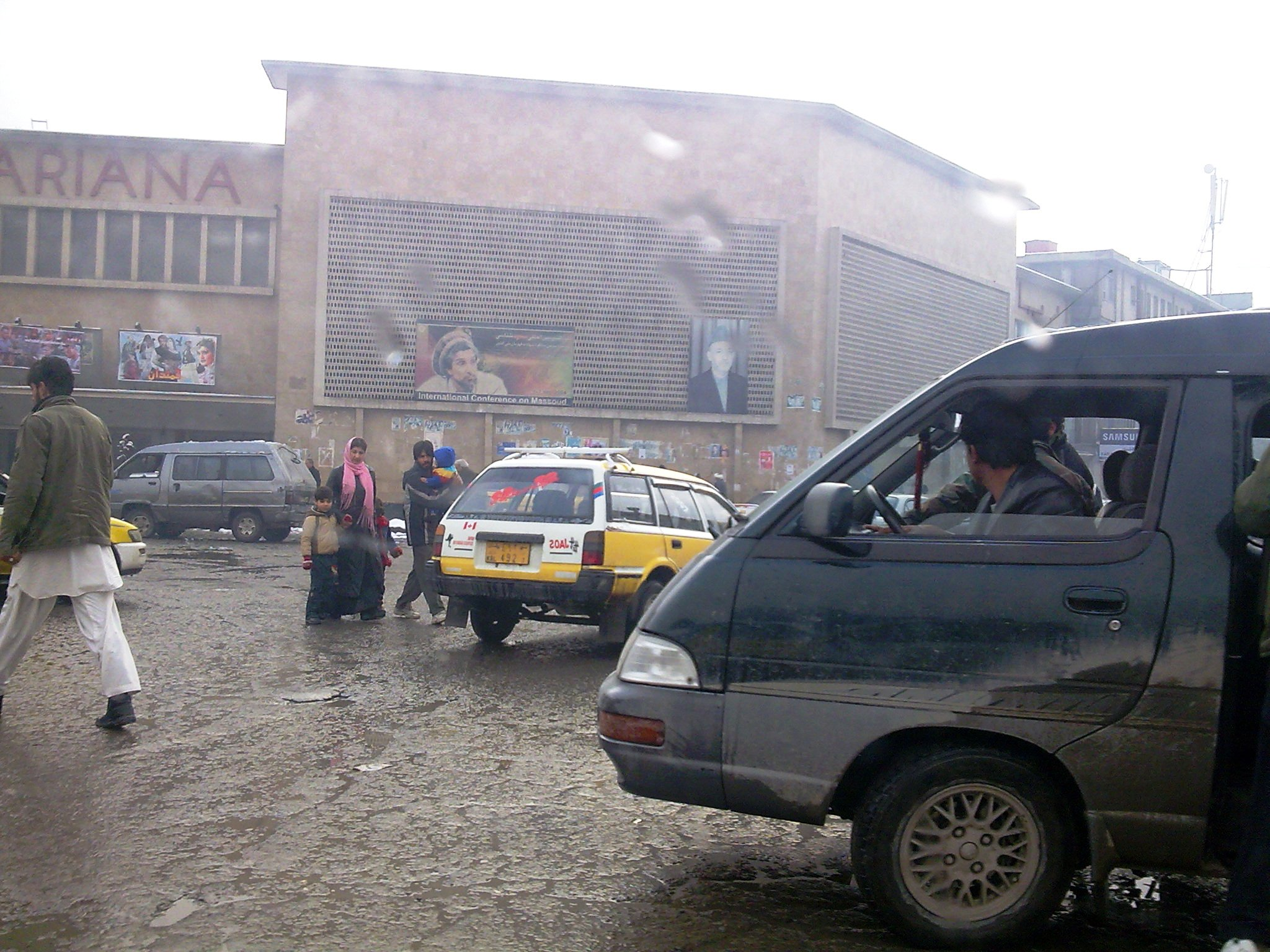
- Interactive map of Ariana Cinema
- Address: Nadir Pashtun Road; Kabul; Afghanistan
- Coordinates: 34.519566220223766°N 69.18034978261572°E
- Seating type: 600
- Type: Movie theatre

Construction
- Opened: 1963
- Demolished: 2025
- Rebuilt: 2004

Ariana Cinema (Dari: سینما آریانا Sīnemā Ārīāna) was a movie theater in Kabul, Afghanistan located near the Pashtunistan Square on the north side of the Kabul river bank. It was considered to be the second oldest cinema in Kabul city center, after Behzad Cinema. It was publicly owned.

== History ==
The Ariana Cinema was originally opened in 1963. In its prime days, it was one of the most famous theaters in the city.

As with other local landmarks, the cinema was destroyed during the Battle of Kabul (1992-96) and remained closed and damaged after the Taliban came to power in 1996. After the fall of Taliban, a group of French filmmakers raised $ 1 million to help complete the cinema. During a visit to Kabul in 2002, Bernard-Henri Lévy met with Siddiq Barmak to discuss the reconstruction of the cinema. On his return to Paris, he co-founded an association to raise funds for the project with Claude Lelouch and Bosnian Danis Tanović, The 'Un Cinema pour Kaboul' association in Paris. In collaboration with the AINA in Kabul, they completed the reconstruction of the Cinema in March 2004. The renovation and new facilities was done with the help of Siddiq Barmak.

The cinema reopened in 2004 with a ceremony where notable political and artistic figures attended, such as the Afghan Deputy Minister of Culture, the Mayor of Kabul and the French Minister of Culture.

The cinema received damage later by a January 2010 suicide bombing near the cinema.

As of 2020, it remained one of four cinemas still operating in Kabul, receiving about 200 spectators of 600 available, reflecting the decline of cinema of Afghanistan. It remained active until the fall of Kabul to the Taliban on August 15, 2021.

Following the Taliban seizure of power, the cinema was occasionally used as a site to screen pro-Taliban propaganda films. In late 2025, it was demolished, with plans to build a shopping mall on its site.

== See also ==
- Cinema of Afghanistan
- Behzad Cinema
- January 2010 Kabul attack
