= Julie le Brocquy =

Julie le Brocquy is co-founder of le Brocquy Fraser Productions. Her production credits include the award-winning Osama.

== Early life ==
Le Brocquy was born in Dublin, Ireland in 1960, and was raised and educated in Ireland. Her father Noel le Brocquy was a businessman, and her uncle Louis le Brocquy (1916-2012) was a prominent modern artist.

She went to in London to work as a banker, and became a trader with Salomon Brothers in the 1980s and 1990s. She later moved from London to Tokyo and then to Singapore.

== Career ==
In Singapore, she founded Clockwork Productions with Julia Fraser. Then Fraser and le Brocquy met the film director U-Wei Haji Saari, with whom they founded Le Brocquy Fraser. Productions with which le Brocquy has been associated include a number filmed in Malaysia, including Buai Laju Laju (2004) and Sepohon Rambutan (2006). She has also produced films in Iran, including Story Undone (2004) and Bibi (2008). She earned critical attention internationally for the film Osama (2004) which was made in Afghanistan.

== Filmography ==
Year	Title	Director	Notes
2004	Buai Laju Laju ("Swing My Swing High, My Darling")	U-Wei Bin HajiSaari	Feature film (Malaysia) which won a "Best Actor" award at the 17th Malaysian Film Festival.
2004	Story Undone	Hassan Yektapanah	Drama from Iran. Covers the story of a group of people trying to migrate illegally to Europe. Premiered at the 2004 Locarno Film Festival. Won the Silver Leopard for Best First and Second Film, a NETPAC award for Best Asian Film, a Special Jury Award at the Amazonas International Film Festival 2004, and the Amnesty International DOEN Award at the 2005 Rotterdam Film Festival.
2004	Osama	Siddiq Barmak	Won the "Best Foreign Film" at the 2004 Golden Globe Awards. Other awards include: Cannes 2003 (Special Mention - Camera D'Or), CICAE Prize 2003, UNESCO-Federico Fellini Award 2003, PUSAN (Korea-Audience Award), Montreal Film Festival (Top prize), Golden Spike at 48th Valladolid Intl Film Festival 2003 (Spain), London Film Festival 2003 (The BFI Sutherland Jury Prize).
2006	Sepohon Rambutan ("My Beautiful Rambutan Tree")	U-Wei Bin HajiSaari	Short film which premiered at Directors Fortnight Cannes in 2006
2006	Wangi Jadi Saksi	U-Wei Bin HajiSaari	Theatrical Play by U-Wei Bin HajiSaari, Malaysia ’06 & Singapore ’07.
2008	Bibi	Hassan Yektapanah	
2009	I Come With The Rain	Tran Anh Hung	
2011	Burma Soldier	Nic Dunlop, Annie Sundberg, Ricki Stern	Awards and nominations included: Emmy Award nomination 2012, Irish Film & Television Awards nomination 2011, UNAFF Best Documentary 2011, Runner up Galway Film Fleadh 2010, Sundance Institute grant, Cinereach grant.
