= Mamnoon =

Mamnoon or Mamnun is a masculine given name of Arabic origin. Notable people with the name include:

== Given name ==
- Mamnoon Hussain (1940–2021), Pakistani businessman and politician
- Mamnoon Maqsoodi (born 1966), Afghan actor
- Mamnoon Rahman (born 1965), Bangladeshi judge
- Mamnun Hasan Emon (born 1983), Bangladeshi actor and model
