= Summer Challenge Camp =

Pakistani television show

- Genre: Reality show
- Created by: Dreamworld Resort
- Theme music composer: Arif Bahaleem
- Country of origin: Pakistan
- Original language: Urdu
- No. of seasons: 2
- No. of episodes: 26

Production
- Executive producers: Arif Bahaleem (season 1); Adeel Arif (season 2)
- Production locations: Dreamworld Resort, Karachi
- Camera setup: D50, PD17 (Multi)
- Running time: 19–21 minutes (per episode)

Original release
- Network: Season 1 Indus Vision, Season 2 Indus Vision and ATV
- Release: July 31, 2009

Related
- Winter Challenge Camp

Summer Challenge Camp is a Pakistani sports reality show for children. It was initially aired on Indus Vision in 2009. In this show, 40 children are shortlisted after physical trials and 8 teams of 5 each are formed. These children stay at the event venue for 10 days. These eight teams compete in different sports and finally 1 team wins at the end of day 10. Trials, training and competitions are recorded and aired in 13 episodes.

== Sports ==
Teams compete in Archery, Bowling, Cricket, Table Tennis and Swimming. Cricket is played on 5a-side format. Other 4 sports are played by individuals rather than whole team. Each victory adds points in the team score. Runner up and 2nd runner up also receive some points.

== Training ==
Participants are trained in all sports, except bowling, by current and former national champions like Moin Khan, Mohammad Sami and Khalid Latif. Shahid Afridi made an appearance in Season 1. Celebrities from other sports give motivational and dietary speeches. These include Abuzar Umrao (hockey Olympian), Anwar Saeed (national Badminton champion), and Nameer Shamsi (represented Pakistan in Junior Davis Cup in 2010).
