= Behzad Cinema =

Movie cinama in Kabul, Afghanistan

- سینما بهزاد
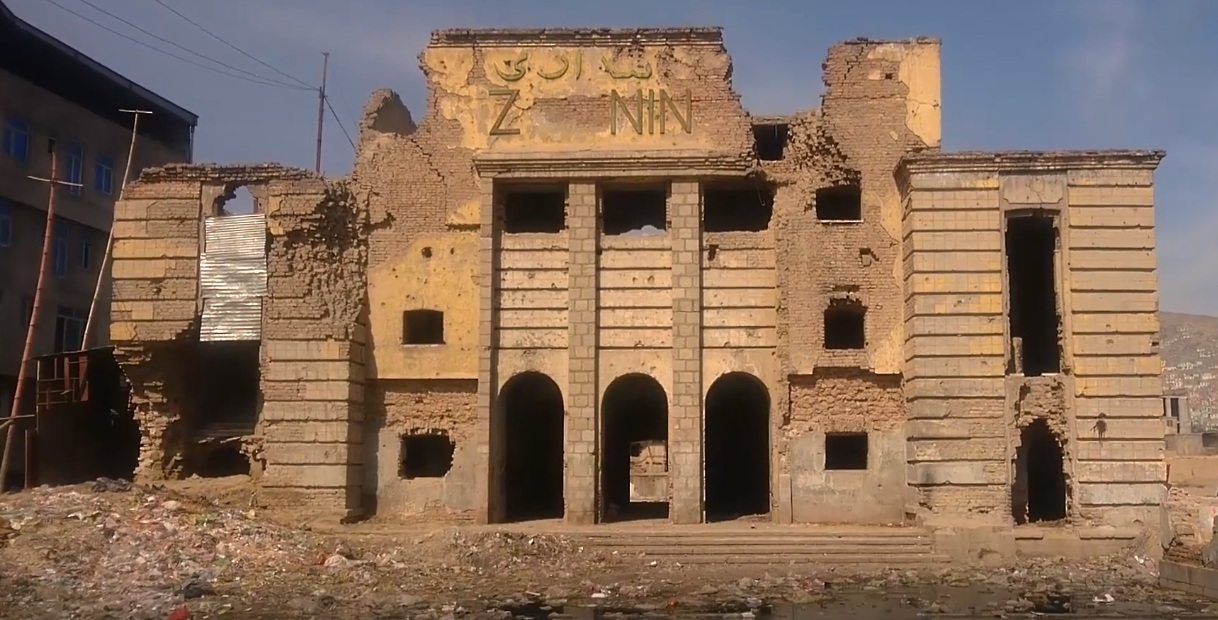
- Behzad Cinema, April 2019
- Interactive map of Behzad Cinema
- Address: Kabul; Afghanistan
- Coordinates: 34.51261857°N 69.17953987°E
- Type: Movie theatre

Construction
- Opened: 1934
- Closed: 2023

Behzad Cinema (Dari: سینما بهزاد) was a movie theatre in Afghanistan, established by the local government of Kabul, one of the oldest in the city. It was built in 1934 by the Kabul Municipality, in the old city area of Bagh-e-Qazi. However, it was abandoned and then became a ruin. The cinema reopened during Mohammed Zahir Shah's reign and became a hotspot for clandestine groups and drug users, as reported in November 2020. In March 2023, the de facto Taliban administration decided to demolish Behzad Cinema to make way for an integrated mosque, residential and commercial complex on the former cinema's site.

== See also ==
- Cinema of Afghanistan
- Ariana Cinema
