= Cinema of Central Asia =

Historical periods of Central Asia of cinema

The Cinema of Central Asia includes the cinema of the five former Soviet Socialist Republics (Kazakhstan, Kyrgyzstan, Tajikistan, Turkmenistan and Uzbekistan) and Afghanistan. Central Asian cinema can further be divided into three historical periods, Soviet Central Asian film (1919–1987), a New Wave of Central Asian film (1988–1992), and the modern period of film of the independent Central Asian countries (1992–present).

== Cinema of Afghanistan ==
Afghanistan's domestic film industry emerged in 1965 upon the creation of the government-funded Afghan Film studios in Kabul, eventuating in production companies such as Nazir Film and Ariana Film. As Kuhn& Westwell note these companies primarily:

"Employed Russian-trained filmmakers such as Khaleq A’lil, Rafiq Yahyaee, and Wali Latifi. Under Soviet occupation (1979–89) film production was [swiftly] centralized and [targeted] towards production of propaganda, including Farar/Escape (1984) and Sabur-e sarbaz/Saboor, the Soldier (1985), both directed by renowned Afghan director ‘Engineer’ Latif Ahmadi."

Decades of conflict, the installation of the Taliban and economic instability have resulted in, between 1951 and 2004 less than forty Afghan films being created.

== Cinema of Kazakhstan ==
The cinema of Kazakhstan was recognized as a hub of Soviet documentaries and "Eastern style" romantics. Almaty, Kazakhstan is the starting place of the Kazakh "New Wave" of perestroika-era cinema (see Rashid Nugmanov). The independent film in Kazakhstan now is characterized by historical epics, such as Sergei Dvortsevoy's "Tulip".

== Cinema of Kyrgyzstan ==
Early Kyrgyz film can be characterized by Russian-language Soviet films, such as "The First Teacher" by Andrei Konchalovsky. Later Kyrgyz films, such as Beshkempir were filmed in the Kyrgyz language and dealt with themes of urban and rural differences in Kyrygyzstan.

== Cinema of Tajikistan ==
Tajik cinema in the Soviet era was marked by propaganda and an emphasis on secularism. Since Tajikistan's independence, Tajik cinema has grown into its own. Because of the Tajik Civil War from 1992 to 1997, virtually all of Tajik cinema before the new millennium was made abroad. Drawing from cinematic traditions in the East, West, and South (particularly from Iranian cinema), Tajik directors have been able to create influential films about the social and historical conditions of their land. Some major films include Bakhtyar Khudojnazarov's [Kosh ba kosh]. The cinema of Tajikistan is held back by a lack of government funding.

== Cinema of Turkmenistan ==
Turkmen cinema has historically been highly regulated by the state government and has been reflective of the political trends. Cinema in Turkmenistan was completely abolished by President Saparmurat Niyazov in the year 2000. Several important films were created in the 1990s including Little Angel, Make Me Happy by director Sapar Usmanov. The ban on cinema has now been lifted.

== Cinema of Uzbekistan ==
Uzbek film has a long list of films produced in the Soviet era and the modern era. The history of Uzbek cinema can be divided into two periods: the cinema of the Soviet Uzbekistan (1924–1991) and the cinema of the independent Uzbekistan (1991-present). Films of the Soviet period were shot either in Russian or Uzbek. Most critically acclaimed films of the Soviet period include films such as Maftuningman (1958), Mahallada duv-duv gap (1960), and Shum bola (1977).

- Arslon Izidan (2017)
- Maktab (2021)
- Ilhaq (2021)
- I'm Not a Terrorist (Men Teraris emasman) (2021)
- Farobiy (2022)
- Uzbekchka (2023)
- Uch Qahramon (2024)
- Kazbek (2025)

== See also ==
- Cinema of Asia
- Cinema of the Soviet Union
