= ATV (Pakistani TV channel) =

Television network in Pakistan

ATV HD (Pakistan)
- Country: Pakistan
- Broadcast area: South Asia; Middle East
- Headquarters: Islamabad

Programming
- Language: Urdu
- Picture format: 16:9 (1080P, HDTV)

Ownership
- Owner: Shalimar Recording & Broadcasting Co. Ltd.

History
- Launched: 24 June 2005; 21 years ago
- Closed: 19 June 2026
- Former names: PTN, STN

Links
- Website: Official website

Availability

Streaming media
- ATV Live Stream: Watch Live

ATV was a Pakistani general entertainment TV channel which aired acquired serials from other channels like A Plus, PTV Home and Hum TV. It also showed children's programs as well as talk shows and a morning show. It was closed on 19 June 2026 due to financial reasons.

== Channel profile ==
The channel originally started as People's Television Network (PTN) in 1990 as the first semi-governmental TV Channel and second TV Channel of Pakistan from Islamabad. In 1991 PTN's name was changed to Shalimar Television Network (STN). STN came under PTV Network and was relaunched as Channel-3 in 1999 and with that the channel made its way to the satellite as well. In 2005 name of the channel was changed to ATV as it was relaunched this time under a joint venture of Shalimar Recording and Broadcasting Company (SRBC). Since 2018 ATV was being operated under Shalimar TV Network of SRBC. ATV now operates with 20 stations covering all major cities and commercial centres of Pakistan.

Atv closed on 19 June 2026 due to non payment of salaries to its employees and financial problems.

== Programming ==
=== Acquired Serials ===
- Shehar e Zaat
- Mere Meharbaan
- Kaneez
- Karam Jali
- Dukh Kam Na Honge
- Aangan Mein Deewaar
- Tu Zindagi Hai
- Gohar e Nayab
- Tum Bin
- Janum

== Programs ==
- Mala Mir
- Dil Nawaz
- Zindagi Gulzar Hai
- Humsafar
- O Rangreza
- Suno Chanda season 1 and 2
- Atv Morning with Farah
- Dumpukht - Aatish-e-Ishq
- Khuda Gawah
- Dil Se Shikayat Hai
- Na Janay Kyun
- Chaap
- Ajnabi Lagey Zindagi
- Mujhe Rang De
- Emaan
- Laal Ishq
- Muhabbat Ab Nahi Hogi
- Number 1
- Muhabbat Yun Bhi Hoti Hai
