= Haji Kamran =

Afghan actor

Haji Kamran is an Afghan actor, best known for his comedic roles in film and television. Kamran started acting in the early 1980s performing stage comedy. He is best known for his role in the famous series Shirin Gul and Sheragha with Shirin Gul Parsoz, directed by Latif Ahmadi and recorded in Moscow, Russia in the 1990s. He now lives in California and does television advertisements and small roles for Ariana Television Network and Ariana Afghanistan TV. He has one son, Farhad Kamran. He usually goes by the name Bache Hajji among his fans and peers. He also operates a film company in Netherlands called Salp films. He starred in the Afghan-American movie In The Wrong Hands and in the Pakistani thriller film "Project Peshawar".

== Credits ==
- Sheraghai Daghalbaaz
- In The Wrong Hands (2002)
- Shrin Gul wa Sheragha
