= Afghan Film =

Film studio and film archive in Afghanistan

- Afghan Film Organization
- Formation: 1968
- Founded at: Kabul
- Type: State-run company
- Legal status: Company
- Purpose: Cinema of Afghanistan
- Headquarters: Kabul
- President: Mawlawi Shafiullah Javid

Afghan Film also known as Afghan Film Organization (AFO) is Afghanistan's state-run film company, established in 1968. One of its former presidents Sahraa Karimi, who attained a PhD in Cinema from the Academy of Performing Arts in Bratislava, was its first female president. After the stewardship of Mawlawi Shafiullah Javid 'Afghan' after the 2021 Taliban takeover, the de facto Taliban administration decided to dissolve Afghan Film on 13 May 2025.

It is also a film archive. Many of its contents were destroyed by the Taliban, although some staff members saved valuable films, risking their own lives. A number of rescue and archival efforts were chronicled in the 2015 documentary A Flickering Truth.

An eight-day film festival was launched on August 3, 2019, showcasing 100 films around different cinemas in the country in celebration of the country's 100th anniversary of independence.

In 2019, the documentary The Forbidden Reel, which details the history of Afghan cinema through interviews and archives, was released. Directed by Afghan-Canadian filmmaker Ariel Nasr, the film premiered internationally at IDFA 2019, and won the Rogers Audience Award at Hot Docs 2020.

== See also ==
- Cinema of Afghanistan
- List of film archives
