= A Few Cubic Meters of Love =

2014 film directed by Jamshid Mahmoudi

- Film poster
- Directed by: Jamshid Mahmoudi
- Written by: Jamshid Mahmoudi
- Produced by: Navid Mahmoudi
- Starring: Saed Soheili; Hasiba Ebrahimi
- Cinematography: Morteza Ghafouri
- Edited by: Sepideh Abdolvahab
- Music by: Sahand Mahdi Zadeh
- Release date: 3 February 2014 (Iran)
- Running time: 90 minutes
- Countries: Iran; Afghanistan
- Languages: Persian; Dari

A Few Cubic Meters of Love (Persian: چند متر مکعب عشق, Chand Metre Moka'ab Eshgh) is a 2014 Iranian-Afghan romance film written and directed by Jamshid Mahmoudi. It was selected as the Afghan entry for the Best Foreign Language Film at the 87th Academy Awards, but was not nominated.

== Plot ==
Saber, an Iranian orphan, lives and works at a factory owned by Mr. Sabahi which is predominantly staffed by Afghan migrant laborers. A romance soon develops between Saber and Marvena, the daughter of working-class immigrant Abdolsalem.

== Cast ==
- Hasiba Ebrahimi as Marvena
- Saed Soheili as Saber
- Alireza Ostadi as Mr. Sabahi
- Nader Fallah
- Masoud Mirtaheri

== Production ==
Film director Jamshid Mahmoudi collaborated with his brother, the producer Navid Mahmoudi, on A Few Cubic Meters of Love. The film was shot on location at a real scrapyard, and according to the director was inspired by his own family's time in Iran as refugees during the 1980s.

Because the film was released in Iran after the Academy's deadline for 2014, it was submitted to the Academy Awards for the nation of Afghanistan.

== Reception ==
A Few Cubic Meters of Love won two Crystal Simorgh awards at the Fajr International Film Festival. The film also was awarded Best Director and Best Cinematography at the Jaipur International Film Festival and three awards (including Best Film) at the Festival international du cinéma d'auteur de Rabat. In 2016, A Few Cubic Meters of Love won Best Film at the Dhaka International Film Festival. It also won Best Film at the 7th Didor International Film Festival in Dushanbe, Tajikistan.

Mohammad Reza Azadi reviewed the film for Tasnim News Agency, highlighting the film's role in humanizing Afghan refugees in Iran. Alissa Simon, writing for Variety, favorably compared the "dynamic, muscular style of direction" to that of the film Slumdog Millionaire and singled out Saed Soheili's performance and Morteza Ghafouri's cinematography for particular praise. John Watanabe, reviewing the film after its appearance at the 2014 Tokyo Filmex, described the film as superficially realistic with relatively undeveloped characters, commenting that "[t]he generally well-heeled audience that votes on the Oscars will find nothing in Mahmoudi’s film that would ruffle anyone’s feathers, and plenty to make them feel good about themselves."

In 2017, an incident where an Afghan boy and girl became trapped in a shipping container in Kabul, resulting in the girl's death, drew comparisons to the plot of A Few Cubic Meters of Love.

== See also ==
- List of submissions to the 87th Academy Awards for Best Foreign Language Film
- List of Afghan submissions for the Academy Award for Best Foreign Language Film
