= The Patience Stone (film) =

- Directed by: Atiq Rahimi
- Written by: Atiq Rahimi; Jean-Claude Carrière
- Produced by: Michael Gentile
- Starring: Golshifteh Farahani; Hamid Djavadan; Massi Mrowat; Hassina Burgan; Malik Akhlaqi
- Cinematography: Thierry Arbogast
- Edited by: Hervé de Luze
- Music by: Max Richter
- Distributed by: Le Pacte
- Release date: 11 October 2012 (London Film Festival)
- Running time: 102 minutes
- Countries: Afghanistan; France
- Language: Dari Persian

The Patience Stone (Persian: سنگ صبور) is a 2012 French-Afghan war drama film directed by Atiq Rahimi, based on his 2008 novel of the same title. Written jointly by Jean-Claude Carrière and the director, the film stars Golshifteh Farahani, Hamid Djavadan, Massi Mrowat, and Hassina Burgan.

The film was selected as the Afghan entry for the Best Foreign Language Oscar at the 85th Academy Awards, although it was not nominated. Farahani was nominated for the Most Promising Actress category at the 39th César Awards. The film is set in Afghanistan and filmed in the country and in areas of Morocco that resembled Soviet-era housing in Kabul. It was produced with participation from the French Ministry of Culture (Ministère de la Culture), Centre national du cinéma et de l'image animée, and multiple independent film production companies. The U.S. release was distributed by Sony Pictures Classics.

== Plot ==
The movie and the book are based on Persian mythology, featuring a sang-e sabur (سنگ صبور), a magic stone that one can talk to disclose all of a person's secrets and hardship. Once all is told, the stone explodes, as if the burden of the person has been transferred to it and the person is relieved of their depressed state. The story happens somewhere in war-torn Afghanistan, and revolves around a woman in her thirties who watches over her older husband in a decrepit room. He is reduced to a vegetative state because of a bullet in the neck. Not only is he abandoned by his mujahideen companions (one of whom has shot him during an argument), but also by his brothers.

One day, the woman decides to tell the truth to her silent husband, explaining to him her feelings about their relationship. She talks about her childhood, her suffering, her frustrations, her loneliness, her dreams, her desires. She says things she could never have said before, even though they have been married for 10 years. The paralyzed husband unconsciously becomes her sang-e sabur, absorbing all her sufferings and secret suppressed thinking.

In her wait for her husband to come back to life, the woman struggles to survive and live. She finds refuge in her aunt's place, who is a prostitute, and the only relative who understands her. The woman seeks to free herself from suffering through the words she delivers audaciously to her husband. Meanwhile, she starts a relationship with a young soldier who helps her financially and around the house.

The story also reveals social problems like male dominance and the fact that many Afghan women have been neglected and humiliated for so long.

== Cast ==
- Golshifteh Farahani as The Woman
  - Marwa Safa Frotan as The Woman (child)
- Hamid Djavadan as The Husband
- Hassina Burgan as The Aunt
- Massi Mrowat as The Young Soldier
- Mohamed Maghraoui as The Mullah
- Malak Djaham Khazal as The Neighbor
- Malik Akhlaqi as The Malikdelha
- Sofia Frotan as The Sister
- Yesna Frotan as The Younger Sister

== Critical reception ==
On Rotten Tomatoes it has a rating of 83% based on reviews from 60 critics. On Metacritic it has a score of 66% based on 24 reviews.

== See also ==
- List of submissions to the 85th Academy Awards for Best Foreign Language Film
- List of Afghan submissions for the Academy Award for Best Foreign Language Film
