= Hava, Maryam, Ayesha =

2019 film

- Film poster
- Directed by: Sahraa Karimi
- Written by: Sahraa Karimi; Sami Hasib Nabizada
- Produced by: Sahraa Karimi; Katayoon Shahabi
- Starring: Arezoo Ariapoor
- Cinematography: Behrouz Badrouj
- Edited by: Mastaneh Mohajer
- Production companies: Noori Pictures; Sahraa Karimi
- Distributed by: Noori Pictures
- Release date: 6 September 2019 (Venice)
- Running time: 86 minutes
- Countries: Afghanistan; France
- Languages: Dari; Persian

Hava, Maryam, Ayesha (Persian: حوا، مریم، عایشه) is a 2019 Afghan drama film directed by Sahraa Karimi. It was the first independent film shot in Afghanistan with an all-Afghan cast and crew.

The film had its world premiere at the Horizons section of the 76th Venice International Film Festival, and its first screening in Asia at the Busan International Film Festival.

== Plot ==
Three women in Kabul face their lives' challenging moments during their respective pregnancy.

Sahraa Karimi says of the characters: "They face difficulties with pregnancy, and also, they question their motherhood. What does it mean to be a pregnant woman in Afghan, patriarchal society? I like all films where women are very strong."

== Cast ==
- Arezoo Ariapoor as Hava
- Fereshta Afshar as Maryam
- Hasiba Ebrahimi as Ayesha

== Reception ==
=== Critical response ===
The Hollywood Reporter spoke of an "accomplished narrative debut from Karimi" with "solid" lead actresses and noted that the three stories of the film were "performed with grace and humanity".

Screen Daily described the film as an "engaging, accessible feature" and "a poignant triptych confronting the plight of women with no control over their bodies or their destinies". The review gave special nods to the "thoughtful production design" and the cinematography capturing "a sense of Kabul’s bustling streets and sprawling cityscapes".

=== Awards and nominations ===
The film was selected as the Afghan entry for Best International Feature Film at the 92nd Academy Awards, but it was not included on the Academy's final list of films for consideration because of alleged questions over the legitimacy of the Afghan committee that submitted the film.

Award	Date	Category	Recipient	Result	Ref.
Venice Film Festival	2019	Venice Horizons Award	Hava, Maryam, Ayesha	Nominated	
Asian World Film Festival	2019	Best Actress	Arezoo Ariapoor, Fereshta Afshar, Hasiba Ebrahimi	Won	
Dhaka International Film Festival	2020	Best Actress	Arezoo Ariapoor, Fereshta Afshar, Hasiba Ebrahimi	Won	
Tasveer South Asian Film Festival	2021	Jury Prize: Best Director	Sahraa Karimi	Won	

== See also ==
- List of submissions to the 92nd Academy Awards for Best International Feature Film
- List of Afghan submissions for the Academy Award for Best International Feature Film
