= Central Asian and Southern Caucasus Film Festivals Confederation =

Central Asian and Southern Caucasus Film Festivals Confederation was founded in 2006.

== Presidents ==
- Gulnara Abikeyeva (2006-)

== Member states ==
- Afghanistan
- Armenia
- Iran
- Kazakhstan
- Kyrgyzstan
- Tajikistan

== Goals ==
- Mutual assistance given to festivals organized in member countries.
- Member nations will establish offices to aid in film production.

== See also ==
- Didor International Film Festival
- Fajr International Film Festival
