= Zolykha's Secret =

2006 Afghan film

- Directed by: Horace Shansab
- Cinematography: S.A. Wagef Hussaini
- Edited by: Horace Shansab
- Release date: 2006
- Running time: 142 minutes
- Country: Afghanistan
- Languages: English; Dari, Pashtu

Zolykha's Secret or Raz-e-Zolykha is a 2006 Afghan film directed by Horace Shansab. It was one of the first feature films produced in the post-Taliban Afghanistan.

Zolykha is the youngest girl in her family. She is vivacious and curious, and exhibits special psychic powers of extrasensory perception of past events and people whose ghosts haunt their home. Amena and Zalmai are her older siblings, who, in their efforts to decipher the meaning of past tragedies and tribulations (both natural and man-made), convince themselves that a positive future is feasible. However, the eldest daughter of the family questions her destiny, as she had been promised in youth to a man who has since become a cruel and vicious militant. Her father realizes the injustice awaiting his daughter and then protests and fights for his daughter's honour. However, events take a tragic turn. This forces the siblings to flee the countryside to the city with the help of a Taliban convert, who against his strict orders, decides to help them.

== Production ==
The film was one of the first major Afghan feature films released after the overthrow of the Taliban in 2001. It was entirely filmed in Afghanistan with an Afghan cast and crew. It was produced in the Dari, Pashtu and Arabic languages, with English sub-titles. For the soundtrack, local Afghan music was interpreted by Ustad Gholam Hussein and Shereen Agha.

== Cast ==
- Hamida Refah
- Zubaida Sahar
- Gholam Farouq Baraki
- Zabiullah Furutan
- Nasrine Habibi
- Samira
- Marina Golbahari
- Mahmur Pashtun
- Abdul Wahed Hasanzada
- Dad'ullah Ahmadzai
