= Salim Shaheen =

Afghan actor (born 1957)

Salim Shahin (Salomon)
- سالمون جان و سلیم شاهین
- Born: 1957 (age 68–69); Kabul, Kingdom of Afghanistan
- Occupations: Film director, actor, film producer, cinematographer
- Known for: Qais-e-Chaifroosh (local movie)
- Height: 171 cm (5 ft 7 in)

Salim Shaheen is an Afghan actor, producer and filmmaker. He has made over 100 films and is the subject of the documentary The Prince of Nothingwood.

== Career ==
Salim Shaheen has made over 100 films in Afghanistan despite the Taliban forbidding the capture of images. The low-budget films are popular and tend to be action-orientated, influenced by Bollywood and kung fu film. He made his first production at the age of 16. Shaheen is known by the nicknames Afghanistan's Steven Spielberg and Sultan-e-cinema. During the Afghan Civil War (1989–1992) Shaheen was a military commander and continued to make films using his soldiers as actors.

In 1995, a filmset was bombed and nine of Shaheen's crew were killed. His film Debt was made in 2004 and led to him becoming nationally famous. French journalist Sonia Kronlund made the documentary The Prince of Nothingwood about Shaheen in 2017. This resulted in him visiting the Cannes Film Festival and Mumbai International Film Festival with the film.

== Personal life ==
Shaheen was born in 1957 on Kabul, Afghanistan. He fell in love with Bollywood cinema when he saw Yaadon Ki Baaraat at the age of 8. He is married with 14 children. Between 1997 and 2004, he lived in Pakistan. Shaheen was arrested for cyber crime in late 2019 for allegedly blackmailing a co-star, as he travelled to a film festival. He denied the charges and was convicted to three years' imprisonment, reduced to two on appeal.
