= Youssof Kohzad =

Afghan actor and writer

- Born: 1935; Kabul, Kingdom of Afghanistan
- Died: 1 February 2019 (aged 83–84); Tracy, California, United States
- Occupations: Novelist, writer, poet, actor, playwright
- Writing career
- Genre: Dramatic Arts
- Notable work: When God Created Beauty

Youssof Kohzad (Farsi: يوسف كهزاد; also spelled Youssef Kohzad; 1935–2019) was an Afghan writer, painter, playwright, artist, poet, actor, and art consultant. He was an ethnic Tajik who immigrated to the United States in 2000. He was married to Zakia Kohzad and resided in Tracy, California, until his death in 2019.

== Background ==
Youssef Kohzad was born in 1935 in the Chendawol district of Kabul, Afghanistan. During his high school years, he wrote plays and created artwork for Kabul Theater. Kohzad graduated from Nejat (Amani) High School in Kabul in 1953. He finished his formal art education from the Academy of Art in Rome, Italy in 1965. After returning from Italy, he traveled to the Soviet Union, India, and East Germany to exhibit his art along with other contemporary Afghan artists. Many of his works are showcased in the Middle Eastern Studies museums in Moscow.

From 1966-1969 he held executive positions in the Ministry of Media and Culture, in which he was the head of the Fine Arts Department.

In 1971, he became the art consultant of Kabul Theater. He wrote eight dramas and all were played on stage. In many of the plays, he played the lead role.

In 1975, he returned to the Ministry of Media and Culture and held the position of president of the ministry until 1992.

In 1976, he founded the National Gallery in Kabul, which included 700 paintings, and some work dating back a hundred years. Unfortunately, out of the 700 works of art, only 30 remain today.

From 1992 until August 2000, Kohzad became a refugee along with his family and was forced to immigrate to India. In August 2000, he moved to the United States, settling in Tracy, California. His first art exhibit in the United States was held in August 2001 in Palo Alto.

Kohzad died on 1 February 2019 at his home in Tracy.

== Education ==
- 1965: Academy of Art (Rome, Italy)

== Online Poems ==
- Black Pearls

== Works ==
- Mojasema Ha May Khandand (1975) as an actor
- Aspects of Beauty in Art
- Kohzad: A collection of Poetry
- When God Created Beauty
