= Maktab (TV series) =

- Also known as: Maktab (School)
- Written by: Saida Vahabova; Feruza Fattohova
- Directed by: Ixtiyor Toʻlaganov
- Starring: Asal Abdullayeva; Abbas Bahadirov; Buzruk Bakhtiyorov; Bekzod Abdumalikov
- Theme music composer: Farruh Sobirov
- Countries of origin: Uzbekistan; Kazakhstan
- Original language: Uzbek
- No. of episodes: 15

Production
- Producer: Bekzod Mirmqxmudov
- Running time: 31 minutes

Original release
- Network: Sevimli TV
- Release: 15 September – 6 October 2021

Maktab is an Uzbek television drama that aired on Sevimli TV. The series, produced by Bekzod Mirmqxmudov, was shot in collaboration with Uzbek and Kazakh filmmakers in three countries: Uzbekistan, Kazakh and the Uzbekistan. The main roles in the film were played by Uzbek actors Abbas Bahadirov, Asal Abdullayeva, Buzruk Bakhtiyorov and Feruza Sobitova - the brightest examples of Uzbek cinema. Mehriddin Rakhmatov, Botir Muhammadjonov and Nigora Karimbaeva played a supporting role in this film.

The series was shot in collaboration with Kazakh filmmakers in Kazakhstan and Uzbekistan. The filmmakers, who initially announced the filming of the series "Serjan Bratan", later told to media that they did not have the funds to shoot the series. The filmmakers have agreed to co-produce "Maktab" instead of "Serjan Bratan".

== Plot ==
A story about a high-schooler, Sanjar, and his friends. Each one of them has his own dreams, plans and challenges. Their enemy, Bakhti, is a spoiled boy, who keeps the whole school in fear by bullying each student who gets on his way. After a fight at the school gym, the two boys start a war for the school leadership and for the attention and love of the new girl.

== Cast ==
- Asal Abdullayeva
- Abbas Bahadirov
- Buzruk Bakhtiyorov
- Bekzod Abdumalikov
- Rano Abdumutalovn
- Begzod Batirov
- Akhmad Usmanov
- Bekzod Yangibeev
- Akmal Mirzo
- Feruza Sobitova
- Mehriddin Rakhmatov
- Zilola Pulatova
- Nigora Karimbaeva
- Botir Muhammadjonov
- Islam Karimov
- Early Abdumutalova
- Doston Mamajonov

== Awards and nominations ==
- 2021 - Uzbek Film Award for the best youth series of the year.
- 2021 - Nominated National Council of Film Critics for best series.
- 2021 - Nominated for the RizaNova Award for Best Young Actor (Buzruk Bakhtiyorov).
