= Saba Sahar =

Afghan actress, film director and producer

Saba Sahar (born 28 August 1975) is an Afghan actress, and the country's first female film director and film producer. Her first film, The Law, (2004) was a major success. She was born in Kabul. She returned to Afghanistan after spending time in exile in Moscow, Tehran and Peshawar, to act in films and plays. Besides being among Afghanistan's most famous actors, Sahar is also a campaigner for women's rights.

Her film Passing the Rainbow (2008) was presented in an art installation at the Chelsea College of Art and Design in 2010.

On 25 August 2020, Sahar was shot and injured by an anonymous gunman while traveling to work in Kabul with her bodyguard and driver. Hit in the stomach, she was taken to a hospital where she underwent a successful surgery.

== Filmography ==
- Commissioner Amanullah (24-part series on Afghan police)
- The Law, 2004
- Passing the Rainbow, 2008 (playing the policewoman and director)
- Kabul Dream Factory, 2011
