= Anwar Hajher =

Afghan American professor and filmmaker

- Born: Mohammad Anwar Hajher; Kunduz, Afghanistan
- Occupations: Film director, educator,
- Years active: 2007-present

Anwar Hajher is an Afghan-American filmmaker. After leaving Afghanistan during the Soviet invasion, he traveled around the world and settled in the United States. In 2008 he directed 16 Days in Afghanistan, a documentary about Hajher traveling to his homeland Afghanistan after 25 years living abroad, and focussing on the different issues that the people have suffered through during the Taliban rule as well as their challenges after the fall of the repressive regime.
