= Latif Ahmadi =

Afghan film director

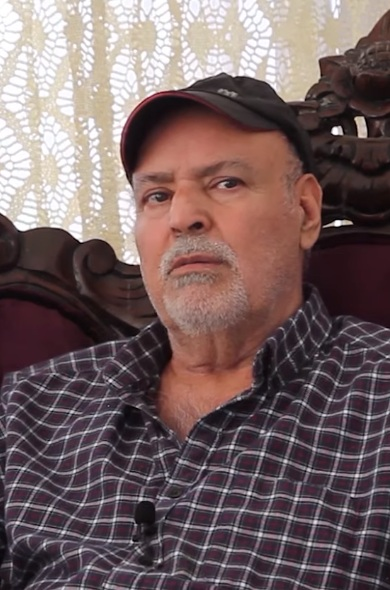
- Ahmadi in October 2020
- Born: Abd al-Latif Ahmadi; January 1, 1950 (age 76); Kabul, Kingdom of Afghanistan

Abdul Latif Ahmadi is an Afghan film director, also known as Engineer Latif Ahmadi. He co-founded Afghanistan's first private film production company Ariana Films (with Toryalai Shafaq and Juwansher Haidary), and became the president of Afghan Film, the state-run Afghan film company.

As the head of Afghan Film, he has been credited with assisting many of the recent films produced in Afghanistan such as Buzkashi Boys, The Black Tulip and The Kite Runner as well as traveling around the world to introduce Afghan cinema to various audiences.

In early 2021, he was interviewed about Afghan Film, the feature films he has directed and the history of filmmaking in Afghanistan, for the TVO/Al Jazeera documentary series The Forbidden Reel, a program which also featured filmmaker Siddiq Barmak and actor Yasamin Yarmal (from the 1989 film Epic of Love).

Ahmadi writes while undergoing dialysis treatment in Europe. As of 2023, he says he has written 6 feature film scripts and 100 episodes for a comedy TV series.

== Films ==
Films that Ahmadi has been involved with include:

- Gonah
- Farar
- Sabor-e sarbaz
- Parenda hai mahajer
- Eshq-e Pery
- Mazrea Sabz
- Sher aqa wa Sheeren goal
- Gumashta

=== As director ===
Titles in English from The Forbidden Reel:

- April Revolution
- Patient Soldier
- Epic of Love (1989), with Yasamin Yarmal, Habib Zorghai, Qader Faroukh and Zarghuna Aram (also known as Hamas-e eshq)
- Sin
- Green Fields
- The Sculptures are Laughing
