= Makhmalbaf =

Makhmalbaf (Persian: مخملباف) is an Iranian surname. Notable people with the surname include:

- Mohsen Makhmalbaf (born 1957), Iranian film director
- Samira Makhmalbaf (born 1980), Iranian film director, daughter of Mohsen Makhmalbaf
- Hana Makhmalbaf (born 1988), Iranian film director, daughter of Mohsen Makhmalbaf
