= Faqir Nabi =

Afghan actor (c.1953–2020)

- Born: 1953
- Died: 26 June 2020 (aged 66–67); Kabul, Afghanistan
- Occupations: Actor, film director
- Years active: 1980-2000
- Height: 175 cm (5 ft 9 in)

Faqir Nabi, also credited as Faqeer Nabi (Afghanistan, c. 1953 – 26 June 2020), was an Afghan film actor whose professional career in Afghan cinema and Bollywood spanned more than 22 years. Nabi appeared in more than 40 Afghan films, including a starring role in Akhtar-e-Maskhara.

== Biography ==
Nabi made his film debut in the Afghan movie, Siah Moye Jalali. He also appeared in a series of Bollywood films, including Kaho Naa... Pyaar Hai (2000), opposite Hrithik Roshan and Shah Rukh Khan. He played the role of Kapala, one of the famous negative characters from the popular TV series Shaktimaan. He was part of an unfinished film, Soqot (transl. Downfall) that featured in a documentary, titled What We Left Unfinished, about unfinished Afghan films.

Faqir Nabi died from COVID-19 at a hospital in Kabul on 26 June 2020, at the age of 67, during the COVID-19 pandemic in Afghanistan. He had been hospitalized for three weeks for coronavirus treatment. Nabi left his wife and daughter, Najma Nabi.
