= Didor International Film Festival =

- Location: Dushanbe, Tajikistan

Didor International Film Festival is a bi-annual film festival in Dushanbe, Tajikistan. Originally conceived as a Persian movie festival, it has now expanded its scope to take in Russian and European movies. A documentary festival takes place in the uneven years.

== 2006 Festival ==
- Golden Didor: "Poet of the Wastes" directed by Mohammad Ahmadi (Iran)

== 2004 Festival ==
- Golden Statue: "Village Council" directed by Ernest Abduzgaparov (Kyrgyzstan)
- Silver Statue for the best direction to "Wild River, Calm Sea" by Marat Sarulu (Kazakhstan)
- Silver Statue for the best actress to Taraneh Alidousti (Iran)

== Grants ==
In 2004, The House of Cinema of Makhmalbaf (Iran) and the DIDOR International Film Festival allocated grants in the amount of USD 2,000 for the creation of the short-feature film by young and gifted filmmakers Shahryar Nazari, Mirzob Nugmanov, Aloviddin Abdullaev, Denis Mechetov, and another $2,000 grant to Bakhtiyor Kakhorov for the creation of a cartoon.

== See also ==
- Central Asian and Southern Caucasus Film Festivals Confederation
