= Shamila Shirzad =

Afghan-Iranian actress (born 2006)

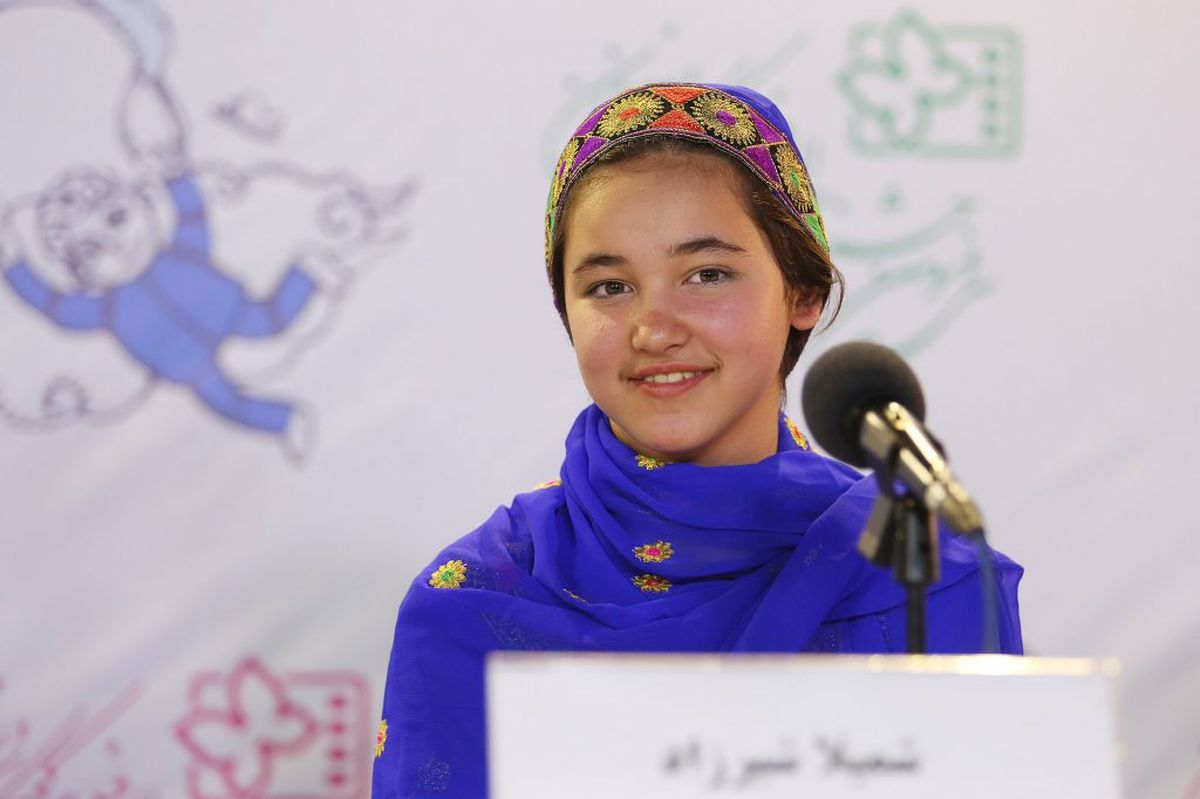
- Shirzad at the 2020 International Film Festival for Children and Youth
- Born: March 14, 2006 (age 19); Tehran, Iran
- Occupation: Actress
- Years active: 2020–present

Shamila Shirzad (Persian: شمیلا شیرزاد; born March 14, 2006) is an Afghan-Iranian actress. She rose to prominence for her role as Zahra in the acclaimed 2020 drama film Sun Children, which was shortlisted at the 93rd Academy Awards for Best Foreign Language Film. Shirzad received a Crystal Simorgh nomination for Best Actress for her performance in Calm Man (2025).

== Early life ==
Shamila Shirzad was born on March 14, 2006, in Tehran, Iran. The first child of an Afghan family from the Hazara ethnic group living in Tehran, her parents are immigrants from Kabul. She has a younger brother, Abolfazl Shirzad, who is also an actor.

== Filmography ==
=== Film ===
Year	Title	Role	Director	Notes	Ref(s)
2020	Sun Children	Zahra	Majid Majidi		
2023	Baru		Amir Hossein Marzban	Short film	
2025	Calm Man	Nobahar	Behnoush Sadeghi		
