= No Woman =

- Persian: زن ممنوع
- Directed by: Yama Rauff
- Written by: Yama Ŕauff
- Story by: Yama Rauf
- Starring: Habibullah Nikzad; Noor Jamal
- Cinematography: Yama Rauf
- Edited by: Yama Rauf
- Release date: March 2015
- Running time: 3 minutes
- Country: Afghanistan
- Language: silent film

No Woman (Persian: زن ممنوع) is a 2015 experimental, arthouse short film from Afghanistan by Yama Rauf. Shot in black and white and presented as a silent film, it is also noted for its feminist themes.

The film debuted in Afghanistan in March 2015, where it was recognized at the Women's Day celebration film competition in Mazar-i-Sharif, winning the Best Film Prize. It was also screened at the 3rd Afghanistan International Women's Film Festival in Herat, before going on to international exhibitions and festivals, including "Fresh Legs 2016" at Galleri Heike Arndt DK in Germany and Denmark, the East Van Short Film Showcase in Vancouver, Canada, and the June 2016 Tracce Cinematografiche Film Fest in Rome.

It went on to win the 2016 "Audience Choice: Experimental Film" award of the Women's Voices Now online film festival and the "Best Experimental Film Award" at Poland's 25th Euroshorts Film Festival.

== Plot ==
Two girls are standing along a desert road that has a sign that says that no women are allowed to cross the line. One girl (Noor Jamal) walks alone through the desert along a road marked by a sign forbidding women to pass. She encounters a masked armed man (Habibullah Nikzad), pulls off his mask, and continues walking, leaving him weeping behind her. Later, a group of girls approach the same road; after hearing a gunshot, they are uncertain what to do, before seeing the mask floating on the wind.

== Cast ==
- Noor Jamal as The Girl
- Habibullah Nikzad as Man in Mask

== Reception ==
Nick Wangersky of Hollywood North Magazine wrote that "in spite of the way they're treated at times, women do matter." He called the project an "artistic film" that "states that women should be allowed to make decisions too," and praised its "innovative and bold way" of showing both the vileness of oppressors and the struggles of women in Islamic countries.

Misty Layne of CinemaSchminema described it as "one of the most beautiful films under 3 minutes I've ever seen," highlighting its desert setting, black-and-white photography, and message of women "following in the footsteps of those who fought before them for equal rights." She also reviewed it for Rogue Cinema, where she similarly praised its artistry and feminist message.

Najibullah Khurshid from Afghanistan's 8am daily noted that while the film portrays women in trouble, it also shows their lack of solidarity with one another. He described No Woman as a "community orientated story... beyond the level of awareness of its audience," and praised it for presenting a fresh, Western-style perspective distinct from the commercially driven filmmaking then common in Afghanistan.

== Theme ==
No Woman highlights the restrictions placed on women in Afghanistan when it comes to making their own decisions. While it shows only a few girls on screen, it is intended as a representation of the struggles faced by most Afghan women, and their aspirations and obstacles.

== Awards ==
- 2015: Best Short Film, Women's Day celebration film competition, Mazar-i-Sharif
- 2015: Screened at the 3rd Afghanistan International Women's Film Festival (Herat)
