= Saeed Orokzai =

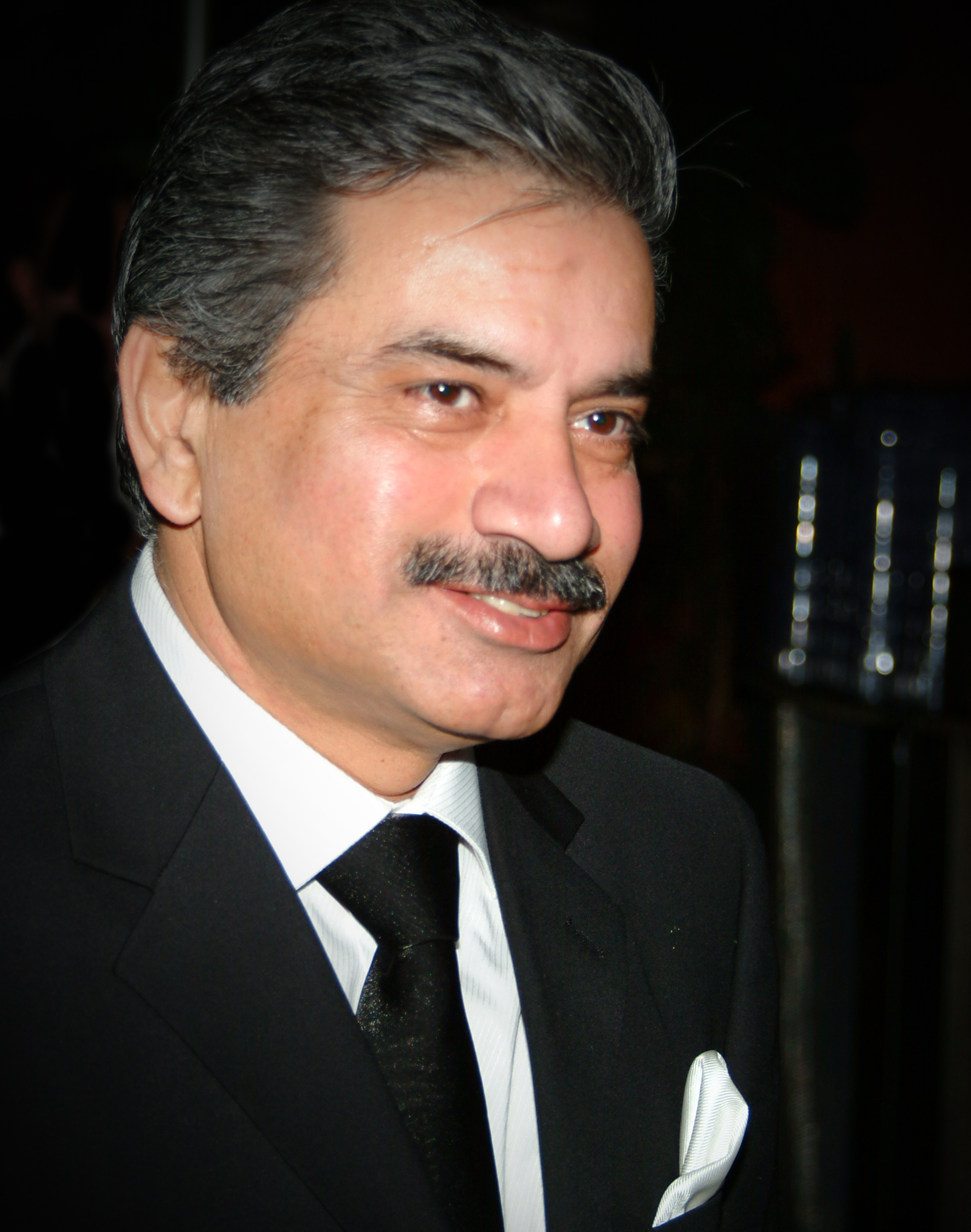
- Saeed Orokzai
- Born: Kabul, Afghanistan
- Occupations: film director, screenwriter, film producer
- Years active: 1980-1990
- Height: 170 cm (5 ft 7 in)
- Children: Nawid Orokzai

Saeed Orokzai is an Afghan filmmaker best known for the 1979 film Mardara Qawl Ast (Dari: مرد ها ره قول اس, meaning "Men Keep Their Promise").

== Early life ==
Saeed Orokzai is from Kabul, Afghanistan, and attended the Kabul University to study Persian literature. Upon graduating he worked for Afghanistan National Radio and TV before entering filmmaking.

== Recognition ==
Saeed Orokzai was awarded the Platinum Award for his short film, Yesterday (2017), in the Best Drama category by the European Independent Film Awards. He received the Gold Award for directing his feature film, Why?, by the FYFF Filmmakers of the Year Film Festival. The film was also recognized by the World Awards of Merit.
