= Mamnoon Maqsoodi =

Afghan actor

- Born: 1966; Kabul, Afghanistan
- Occupation: Actor

Mamnoon Maqsoodi (Pashto: ممنون مقصودي) is a well known Afghan actor. He made his acting debut with the film De Konday Zoy playing the role of a simple minded villager named Shadgul.

== Early life and education ==
Mamnoon Maqsoodi was born in 1966 in Kabul, Afghanistan. He completed his primary education in a local school and graduated from Avicenna High School in Kabul. After completing his high school, he went to serve in the military for 3 years and 10 months.

Once he served his term in the military, he was admitted to the Faculty of Arts in Kabul University. Before completing his final year, the war against the communist regime intensified and he had to migrate to Peshawar, Pakistan.

== Work life ==
While in Peshawar, Mamnoon worked for BBC Afghanistan's educational program. After the fall of Taleban, he returned to Kabul, Afghanistan where he is still working for BBC.
