= Marina Golbahari =

Afghan actress

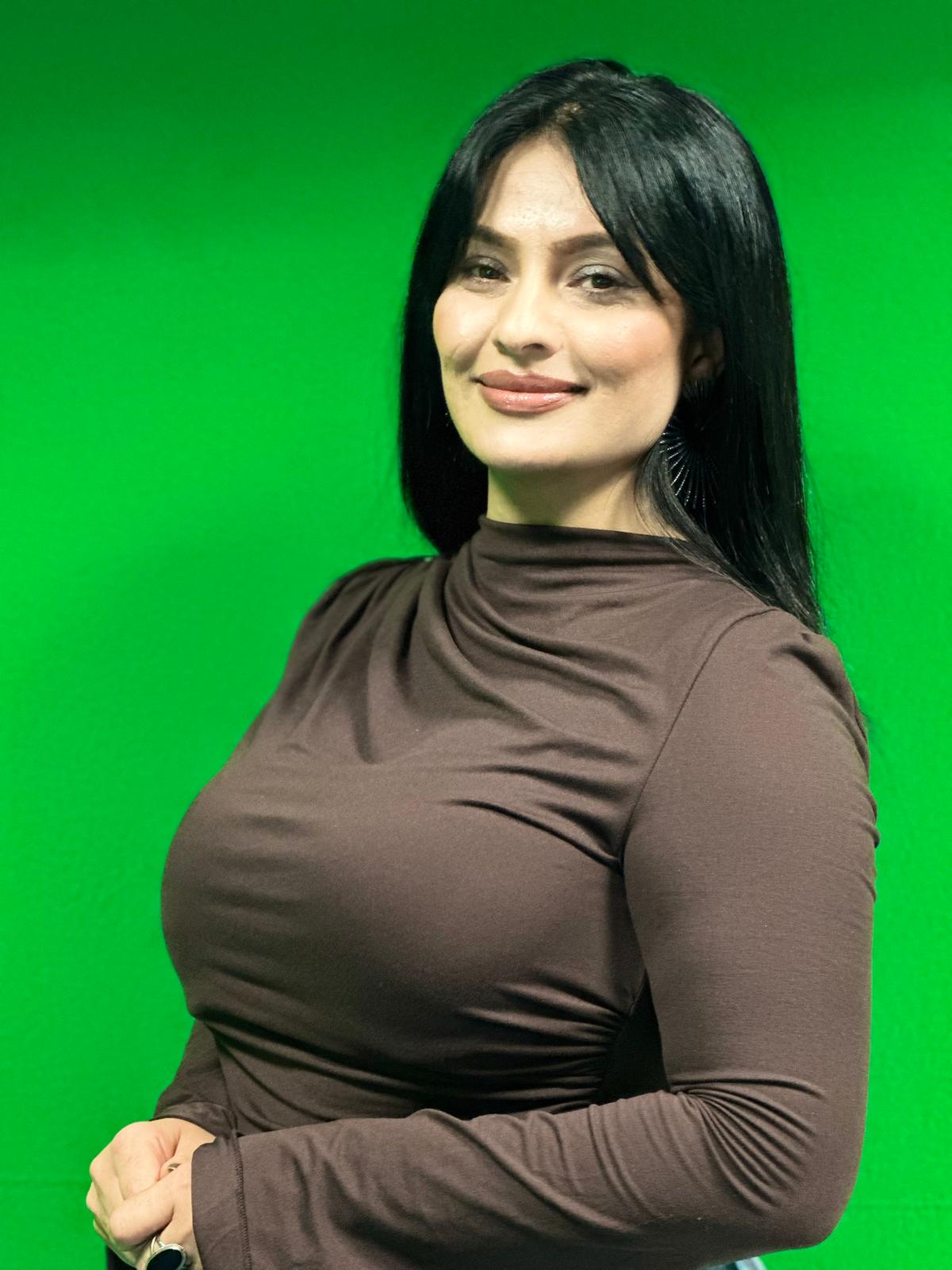
- Born: 1992 (age 33–34); Kabul, Afghanistan
- Occupation: Actress

Marina Golbahari (Dari: مارینا گلبهاری; born 1992) is an Afghan actress who earned international fame for her role as the title character in the 2003 film Osama, playing a girl who had to dress and act as a boy to support her family during the Taliban years.

== Career ==
Golbahari was cast as Osama by the Afghan film director Siddiq Barmak, who picked her roaming on the streets of Kabul as a beggar. The movie went on to earn the Golden Globe award in the category of Best Foreign Film and Golbahari's performance was well received by many critics, including The Arizona Republic 's Richard Nilsen, who wrote, "there is no shortcoming in the acting of Marina Golbahari".

Golbahari figures prominently in the 2012 book, Shakespeare in Kabul, by Qais Akbar Omar and Stephen Landrigan. The book chronicles a 2005 performance in Dari of Shakespeare's Love's Labour's Lost that was presented in Kabul and then in other parts of Afghanistan the following year.

== Personal life ==
Golbahari is married to Noorullah Azizi, who is also involved with the film industry in Afghanistan.

Golbahari and her husband are currently living in exile in an asylum shelter in France as Golbahari has received numerous death threats after being photographed at a South Korean film festival without her head covered.

== Awards and nominations ==
- Molodist International Film Festival (2003) "Best Young Actor Award" for Osama
