= Wajma (An Afghan Love Story) =

- Directed by: Barmak Akram
- Written by: Barmak Akram
- Starring: Wajma Bahar
- Cinematography: Barmak Akram
- Release date: 20 January 2013 (Sundance)
- Running time: 90 minutes
- Country: Afghanistan
- Language: Dari (Persian)

Wajma (An Afghan Love Story) is a 2013 Afghan drama film written and directed by Barmak Akram. The film was selected as the Afghan entry to compete for the Best Foreign Language Film Oscar at the 86th Academy Awards.

== Synopsis ==
The film tells the story of a clandestine love affair in Kabul between Wajma, a 20-year-old law student who wears a headscarf and lives quite freely, and Mustafa, a 25-year-old waiter. Wajma's parents belong to the petty bourgeoisie. Wajma is pregnant with Mustafa's child: out of wedlock, it is a scandal, a dishonor and a crime. Mustafa refuses the marriage. Wajma's father is called in to solve the problem: he severely beats his daughter, threatens to kill her, and locks her up at the stake. Wajma sets fire to it, escapes, and her father gives her a passport to travel to Delhi for an abortion. She leaves Kabul in tears.

== Cast ==
- Wajma Bahar
- Mustafa Abdulsatar
- Haji Gul Aser
- Brehna Bahar

== Awards and nominations ==
Award	Date	Category	Recipient	Result	Ref.
Sundance Film Festival	January 2013	Grand Jury Prize	Wajma (An Afghan Love Story)	Nominated	
Sundance Film Festival	January 2013	World Cinema Screenwriting Award	Barmak Akram	Won	
Amazonas Film Festival	November 2013	Special Jury Award	Wajma (An Afghan Love Story)	Won	
Luxembourg City Film Festival	2013	Grand Prix	Wajma (An Afghan Love Story)	Nominated	

== See also ==
- List of submissions to the 86th Academy Awards for Best Foreign Language Film
- List of Afghan submissions for the Academy Award for Best Foreign Language Film
