= Atiq Rahimi =

French-Afghan writer

- عتیق رحیمی
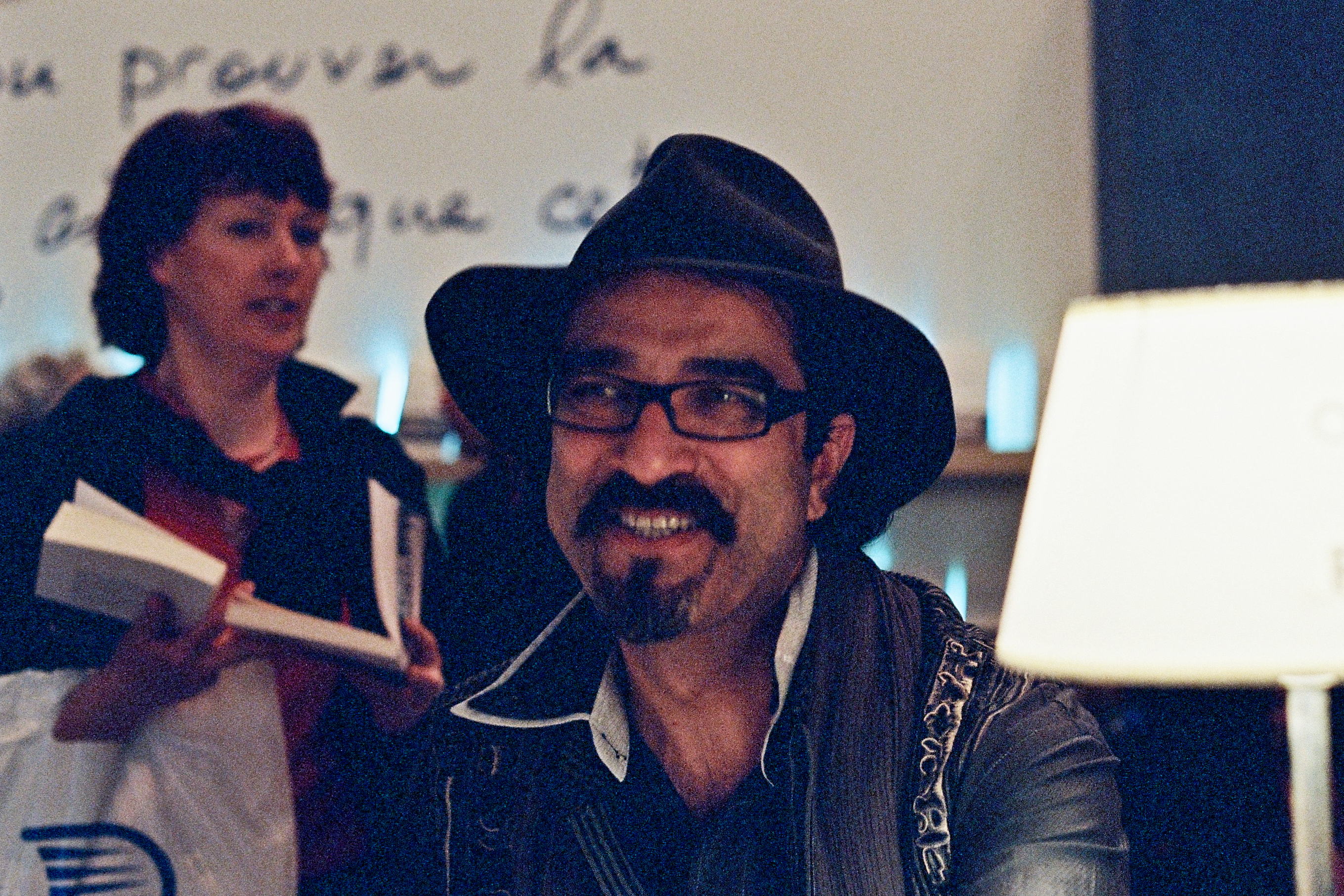
- Atiq Rahimi in 2009
- Born: 26 February 1962 (age 64); Kabul
- Occupations: Senior Creative Advisor, Writer, Photographer and Film Director, Senior Creative Advisor, Moby Media Group

Atiq Rahimi (Persian: عتیق رحیمی; born 26 February 1962 in Kabul) is a French-Afghan writer and filmmaker.

== Life ==
Atiq Rahimi was born in 1962 in Kabul to a senior public servant and attended high school at Lycée Esteqlal. Following the Soviet invasion, Rahimi fled Afghanistan, taking refuge in Pakistan for a year and then relocating to France in 1985 after receiving political asylum.

On completion of his studies at the Sorbonne, Rahimi joined a Paris-based production company where he produced seven documentaries for French television, as well as several commercials.

Taking time off in the late 1990s, Rahimi embarked on his first writing project. His 2000 Dari/Persian book, Earth and Ashes, was an instant bestseller in Europe and South America. A movie based on this book, directed by Rahimi, was awarded the Prix du Regard vers l'Avenir at the 2004 Cannes Film Festival. The film was featured in 50 festivals, winning a total of 25 awards including one at Cannes and a Golden Dhow award for best feature film at the Zanzibar International Film Festival.

After the fall of the Taliban, Rahimi returned to his native Afghanistan in 2002, after 17 years of exile, and used a 150-year-old box camera to take pictures of Kabul. Six of these photographs were later purchased by the Victoria and Albert Museum in London.

In November 2008, Rahimi won France's most prestigious literary prize, the 105-year-old Prix Goncourt, for Syngué Sabour. Described as "sober and alive" by French culture minister Christine Albanel, it was translated into English as The Patience Stone. Rahimi's fourth book and his first in French, the novel tells the story of a woman whose husband has been wounded in battle in a country resembling Afghanistan and now lies as paralysed as a stone.

Upon his return to Afghanistan in 2002, Rahimi became involved with the nation's largest media group, Moby Group, as a senior creative advisor. The group, established by brothers Saad Mohseni, Zaid Mohseni and Jahid Mohseni, owns Tolo TV, Arman FM, Kaboora Production, Barbud Music, Lemar TV, Afghan Scene Magazine, and a host of other media related entities. Rahimi, who divides his time between Kabul and Paris, continues to work closely with the Moby Group in developing programs and genres for its media outlets, as well as helping develop and train a new generation of Afghan filmmakers and directors.

Rahimi created and developed Tolo TV's "Raz ha een Khana" (Secrets of this House), Afghanistan's first soap opera. The hugely popular "Secrets of this House" took the Special Award at the Seoul Drama Awards in October 2008.

Rahimi directed a 2012 film adaptation of "Syngué Sabour" or The Patience Stone from a screenplay he co-authored with Jean-Claude Carrière. The film, starring Iranian actress Golshifteh Farahani, was selected as the Afghan entry for the Best Foreign Language Oscar at the 85th Academy Awards, but was not nominated.

Rahimi's third feature film as director, Our Lady of the Nile, premiered as the opening film of the Contemporary World Cinema program at the 2019 Toronto International Film Festival.

Atiq Rahimi was selected as a 2023 Cannes Film Festival jury member, marking another achievement in his distinguished career. Rahimi's films have been recognized internationally, including at the Cannes Film Festival, reflecting his unique artistic vision and his contributions to both Afghan and global cinema. His role as a jury member at such a prestigious event underscores his status as a prominent figure in the film industry.

=== Bibliography ===
- Rahimi, Atiq; Nouri, Sabrina (2000), Terre et cendres (in French), P.O.L, ISBN 9782867447617
- Rahimi, Atiq (2002), Earth and Ashes (Khâkestar-o-khâk), Harcourt, Incorporated, ISBN 9780151006984
- Les Mille Maisons du rêve et de la terreur (published in English as A Thousand Rooms of Dream and Fear), 2002
- Rahimi, Atiq (2005), Le retour imaginaire (in French), P.O.L, ISBN 9782846821124
- Rahimi, Atiq (2011), Singué sabour. Pierre de patience (in French), POL Éditeur, ISBN 9782846823944
- Maudit soit Dostoïevski (published in English as A Curse on Dostoevsky), 2011
- Rahimi, Atiq (2013), Three, Other Press, ISBN 9781590516300
- Rahimi, Atiq (2015), La Ballade du calame (in French), Iconoclaste, ISBN 9782913366961
- Rahimi, Atiq (2015), Compte comme moi! (in French), Actes Sud Editions, ISBN 9782330047795
- Rahimi, Atiq (18 October 2017), Dessine-moi un dieu (in French), Actes Sud Editions, ISBN 9782330086664
- Rahimi, Atiq (3 January 2019), Les porteurs d'eau (in French), POL Editeur, ISBN 9782818038130
- Rahimi, Atiq (2020), L'invité du miroir (in French), P.O.L, ISBN 9782818049570
- Rahimi, Atiq; Rahimi, Alice (2022), Si seulement la nuit (in French), POL Éditeur, ISBN 9782818053850
- Rahimi, Atiq (2023), Mehstî, chair des mots (in French), Calmann-Lévy, ISBN 9782702163764

=== Filmography ===
- Roya, 1999
- Earth and Ashes, 2004
- The Patience Stone, 2012
- Our Lady of the Nile, 2019
