= Sahraa Karimi =

Afghan film director

- صحرا کریمی
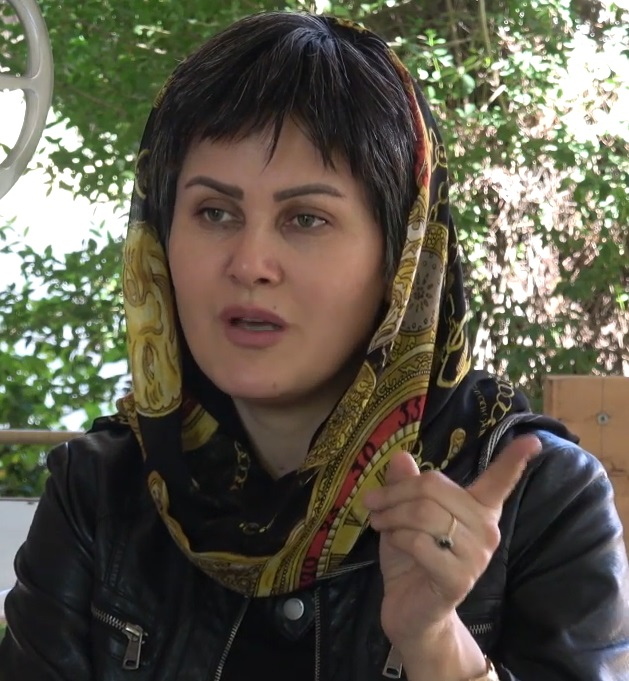
- Sahraa Karimi in 2019
- Born: 20 April 1981 (age 45); Tehran, Iran
- Occupations: Film director, Screenwriter, Film editor, Women rights activist
- Known for: First female general director of Afghan Film in 2019; Directing Hava, Maryam, Ayesha (2019)
- Height: 170 cm (5 ft 7 in)

Sahraa Karimi (or Sughra Karimi;; born 20 April 1981) is an Afghan film director who was the first female chairperson of the Afghan Film Organization (also known as Afghan Film). She has directed 30 short films, 3 documentary films and one fiction film Hava, Maryam, Ayesha which had its world premier at the 76th Venice Film Festival. Prior to the fall of Kabul to the Taliban, she was the first and, as of 2021, only woman to be directing Afghanistan's film entity.

== Background ==
Karimi was born and raised in Iran to Afghan refugee parents. Her father belongs to Pashtun ( AliZai) ethnic group from Kandahar, who has emigrated to district of Bandar, Daykundi Province. She has received a PhD degree in the field of Cinema (Fiction Film Directing & Screenwriting) from the Film and Television Faculty of the Academy of Music and Performing Arts in Bratislava, Light Breeze, a short fiction she made during her time in the academy, went on to win as the Best Short Fiction Film at the Sun in a Net Awards (the highest film awards in Slovakia). Her first professional work was a documentary, Searching for Dream, which was exhibited at the Dhaka International Film Festival in 2006. Her other notable works include Afghan Women behind the Wheel, which won around 20 awards at major film festivals, including Academy awards in Slovakia and the best documentary film award at the 13th Dhaka International Film Festival. In 2019, she directed the film Hava, Maryam, Ayesha, which premiered at the Venice Film Festival and was nominated for an Orizzonti/ Horizon Prize (award for Best Film).

Karimi was the leading organizer of protests against Kabul Municipality's plans to demolish the once famous Cinema Park in the city. She and cultural activists and filmmakers were against the destruction of the 1950s cinema that fell into disarray, calling it "catastrophic" to the city's culture and history. The demolition went ahead in November 2020 and Karimi had to be forcibly moved by police from the cinema to allow it to take place. A photo of her weeping as the demolishers came went viral on social media.

In August 2021, following the fall of Kabul to Taliban, she mentioned: "I went to the bank to get some money; they closed and evacuated. I still cannot believe this happened", adding, "They are coming to kill us". Later, she was evacuated from Kabul to Kyiv, Ukraine along with 11 individuals, thereafter writing: "My dear friends do not worry, I am fine and safe". Later that year Karimi settled in Italy and in 2022 started teaching as a visiting professor at the National School of Cinema in Rome.

== Works ==
- Hava, Maryam, Ayesha (2019)
- Parlika (2016)
- Afghan Women Behind the Wheel (2009)
