= Barmak Akram =

French film director

- Born: 1966 (age 58–59); Kabul, Afghanistan
- Occupation(s): film director, screenwriter

Barmak Akram, (Persian: برمک اکرم) (born in 1966 in Kabul), is an Afghan filmmaker. Akram lives in Paris, where he studied fine arts. His first feature film, Kabuli Kid (2008), won several awards and has been shown at the Venice Film Festival. At the 65th Venice International Film Festival at the 23rd International Film Critics' Week and won EIUC Human Rights Film Award. Also, in the Simorghs of the East section - International Cinema Competition of 27th Fajr International Film Festival Barmak Akram received Best debut for his film Kabuli Kid. In 2013, he received the Best Screenplay award at the Sundance Film Festival for the film Wajma (An Afghan Love Story). He has also made experimental and documentary films, including an episode of Toutes Les Teles Du Monde (2009).

== Filmography ==
- Kabuli Kid (2008)
- Toutes les télés du monde "La télévision des Afghans" (2009)
- Wajma (An Afghan Love Story) (2013)
