= Earth and Ashes =

2004 film

- Persian: خاکستر و خاک
- Directed by: Atiq Rahimi
- Written by: Kambuzia Partovi; Atiq Rahimi
- Produced by: Dimitri de Clercq
- Starring: Abdul Ghani
- Cinematography: Éric Guichard
- Edited by: Urszula Lesiak
- Release date: 13 May 2004
- Running time: 102 minutes
- Country: Afghanistan
- Language: Dari

Earth and Ashes (Persian: خاکستر و خاک) is a 2004 Afghan film directed and co-written by Atiq Rahimi, based on his book of the same name which was published in 2000. It was Afghanistan's submission to the 77th Academy Awards for the Academy Award for Best Foreign Language Film but was not nominated. It was also screened in the Un Certain Regard section at the 2004 Cannes Film Festival. It won the Golden Dhow award at the 2005 Zanzibar International Film Festival.

== Cast ==
- Abdul Ghani as Dastaguir
- Jawan Mard Homayoun as Yassin
- Kader Arefi as Fateh
- Guilda Chahverdi as Zaynab
- Walli Tallosh as Mirza Qadir
- Malik Akhlaqi as Malik Khan

== See also ==
- List of submissions to the 77th Academy Awards for Best Foreign Language Film
- 16 Days in Afghanistan
