= Osama (film) =

2003 film

- American theatrical release poster
- Directed by: Siddiq Barmak
- Written by: Siddiq Barmak
- Produced by: Julia Fraser; Julie Le Brocquy
- Starring: Marina Golbahari; Malik Akhlaqi; Arif Herati; Zubaida Sahar; Zabih ullah Frotan
- Cinematography: Ebrahim Ghafori
- Edited by: Siddiq Barmak
- Music by: Mohammad Reza Darvishi
- Production companies: Barmak Film; NHK; Swipe Films
- Distributed by: A-Film Distribution (Netherlands); Uplink (Japan); ICA Film Distribution (UK/Ireland)
- Release dates: 20 May 2003 (Cannes); 27 June 2003 (Afghanistan)
- Running time: 83 minutes
- Countries: Afghanistan; Netherlands; Japan; Ireland; Iran
- Language: Dari
- Budget: $46,000
- Box office: $3.8 million

Osama (Dari: اُسامه, romanized: Osamah) is a 2003 drama film made in Afghanistan by Siddiq Barmak. The film follows a preteen girl living in Afghanistan under the Taliban regime who disguises herself as a boy, Osama, to support her family. It was the first film to be shot entirely in Afghanistan since 1996, when the Taliban regime banned the creation of all films. As of 2018, the film was the highest-grossing Afghan film of all time. The film is an international co-production of companies in Afghanistan, the Netherlands, Japan, Ireland, and Iran.

== Etymology ==
Although the title of the film highlights an allegorical relevance to Osama bin Laden, there is no further similarity. The film takes place during the Taliban regime in Afghanistan, which is especially repressive for women.

== Plot ==
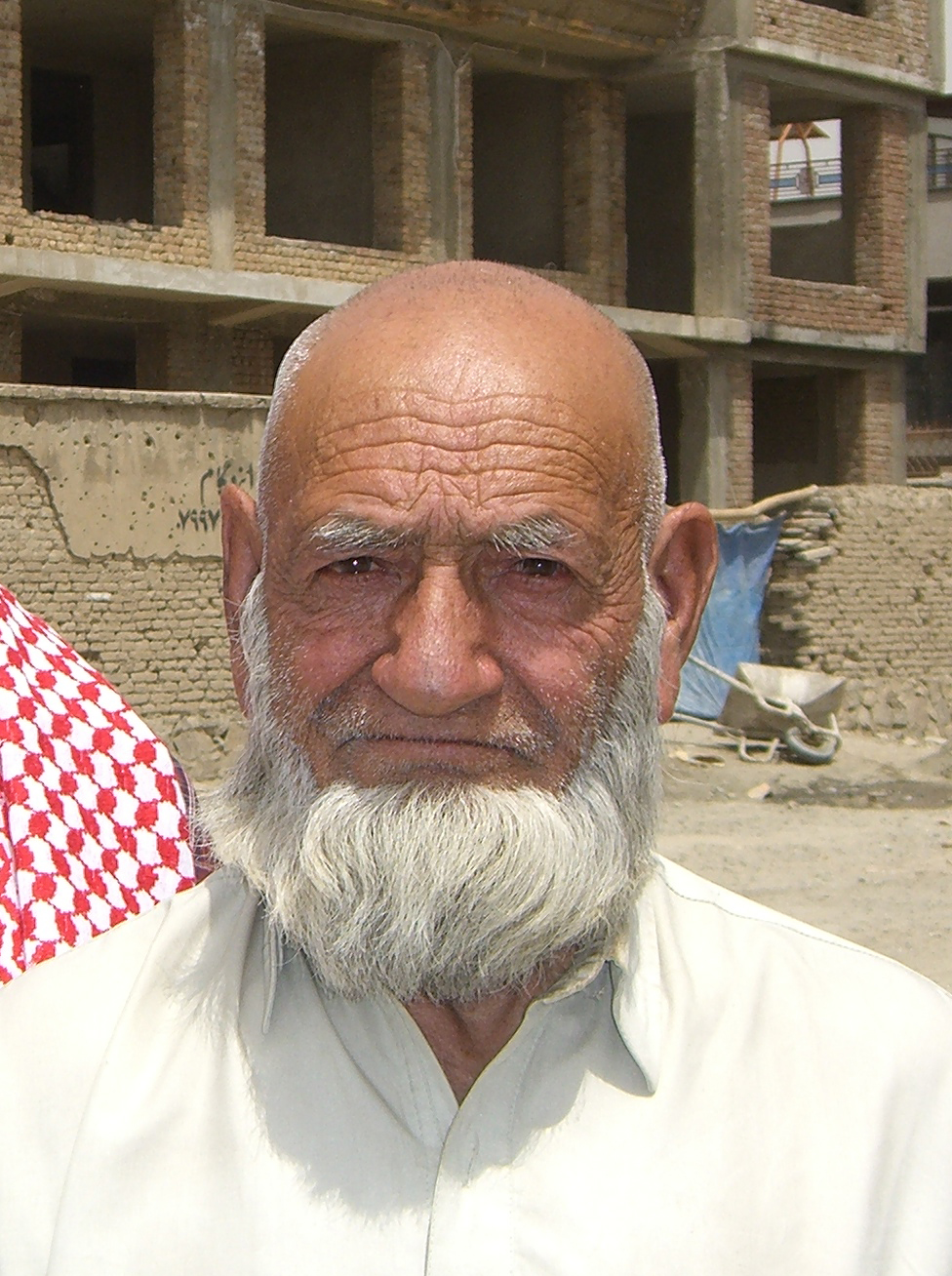
Actor Khwaja Nader in Kabul, Afghanistan, July 2006.

In Taliban-ruled Afghanistan, women must wear all-enveloping burqas to cover themselves and are banned from working outside the home. This causes difficulty for a family consisting of only an unnamed young girl, her mother, and her grandmother, whose male relatives have been killed in battle during the Soviet invasion and subsequent civil wars. The mother loses her hospital job when the Taliban cuts off funding, and cannot find other work.

Desperate, the mother and grandmother decide to have the young girl disguise herself as a boy so that she can get a job. To persuade the girl to accept the plan, the grandmother tells her an Afghan fable about a boy who became a girl when he went under a rainbow. The girl reluctantly agrees, despite being afraid that the Taliban will kill her if they discover her masquerade. They cut her hair, and the girl plants a lock of it in a flowerpot. The only other people who know of the ruse are the milk vendor, who gives her a job because he was a friend of her deceased father, and a local boy named Espandi who sees through her disguise. It is Espandi who renames the girl Osama.

The masquerade becomes more difficult when the Taliban draft all the local boys into their madrasa, a religious and military training school for boys. They are taught how to fight and conduct ghusl, ritual ablutions, including one for when they experience a nocturnal emission or, when they are older, have sex with their wives. Osama attempts to avoid joining the ablution session, and the schoolmaster grows suspicious of her. She realises that she will inevitably be found out. Several of the boys begin to pick on her. Espandi is able to protect her at first, but her secret is discovered when she begins to menstruate.

Osama is arrested and put on trial along with two other people. The others are condemned and put to death, but as Osama is destitute and helpless, her life is spared; she is instead given in marriage to a much older man. He already has three wives, all of whom hate him and say he has destroyed their lives. The wives take pity on Osama, but are powerless to help her. The husband shows her the padlocks he uses on his wives' rooms, reserving the largest for her. The film ends with the new husband leading Osama to a room, then him conducting an ablution in an outdoor bath, which the boys were earlier taught to conduct after ejaculation.

== Cast ==
- Marina Golbahari – Osama
- Arif Herati – Espandi
- Zubaida Sahar – Mom
- Malik Akhlaqi – Sun osama
- Gol Rahman Ghorbandi – Lady No. 1
- Mohamad Haref Harat – Lady No. 2
- Mohamad Nader Khadjeh – Lady No. 3
- Khwaja Nader – Jadi
- Hamida Refah – Rohmi

== Production ==
Siddiq Barmak's inspiration was found in a news story he read while in Peshawar, Pakistan. The paper told the story of a girl who had dressed as a boy to attend school but was eventually discovered by the Taliban. Barmak would go on to add elements of other stories that were shared with him by people who had lived in Afghanistan under Taliban rule, culminating with the story of the film.

The film was shot on location in Kabul. Work began in June 2002 and was completed in March 2003 with a budget of approximately $46,000. All the actors in the film are amateurs found by the director on the streets of Kabul. Much of the dialogue was improvised by the actors.

Osama was originally titled Rainbow and ended on a hopeful note, with Osama passing under a rainbow and gaining her freedom. As time went on, Barmak grew dissatisfied with the ending, describing it as unrealistic for post-war Afghanistan. He changed the ending and title to reflect his feeling that Afghan women were still not truly free at the time he made the film.

== Reception ==
Osama was very well received by the Western cinematic world. It gathered a rating of 96% based on 100 reviews collected by Rotten Tomatoes, a website which tabulates the reviews from professional film critics into a single rating. The site's critical consensus reads: "Osama is bitterly honest, deeply disturbing, and utterly worth watching." Metacritic, which uses a weighted average, assigned the film a score of 83 out of 100, based on 35 critics, indicating "universal acclaim". Writing for feminist magazine Off our backs, Priya Verma described the film as "gripping and unflinching." She worried that the film might seem unduly negative toward Islam, but concluded that Barmak's focus was the authoritarian control tactics employed by the Taliban against women contributed, rather than Islam in general. In The Hudson Review, Bert Cardullo pointed out the film's intentional omission of any spoken female names, emphasizing the casual, unthinking oppression of women under the Taliban regime.

=== Box office ===
The film was a box office success, grossing $3,888,902 worldwide from a small budget of $46,000. As of 2018, the film was the highest-grossing Afghan film of all time.

== Awards and nominations ==
Bratislava International Film Festival

- Awarded: Special Mention
- Nominated: Grand Prix for F1

Cannes Film Festival

- Awarded: AFCAE Award
- Awarded: Cannes Junior Award
- Awarded: Golden Camera – Special Mention

Cinemanila International Film Festival

- Awarded: Best Actress – Marina Golbahari
- Nominated: Lino Brocka Award

Golden Globes

- Awarded: Golden Globe Best Foreign Language Film – Afghanistan

Golden Satellite Awards

- Nominated: Golden Satellite Award Best Motion Picture, Foreign Language – Afghanistan

Golden Trailer Awards

- Won: Golden Trailer Best Foreign

London Film Festival

- Won: Sutherland Trophy

Molodist International Film Festival

- Won: Best Film Award Best Full – Length Fiction Film
- Won: Best Young Actor Award – Marina Golbahari

Busan International Film Festival

- Won: New Currents Award – Special Mention
- Won: PSB Audience Award

Valladolid International Film Festival

- Won: Golden Spike

Young Artist Awards

- Nominated: Young Artist Award Best International Feature Film

== See also ==
- Bacha posh, the practice depicted in the film where a family without sons may pick a daughter to live as a boy
- The Breadwinner, a 2017 film with a similar premise.
- Cross-dressing in film and television
