= 16 Days in Afghanistan =

- Film poster
- Directed by: Anwar Hajher
- Produced by: Mithaq Kazimi
- Cinematography: Karim Hamdard
- Edited by: Mithaq Kazimi
- Music by: Ahmad Shah Hassan; Larry Porter; Hariprasad Chaurasia
- Distributed by: KDK Factory
- Release date: December 2007
- Running time: 60 minutes
- Countries: United States; Afghanistan; India
- Languages: English; Pashto; Dari

16 Days in Afghanistan is a 2007 documentary film about the journey of Afghan-American Anwar Hajher, also the director, traveling to his homeland Afghanistan after 25 years living abroad, to rediscover his country. The film is produced by Mithaq Kazimi and is the first documentary since the fall of Taliban to be shot in those provinces which remain under the heavy influence of the Taliban. The film became a reference film on Afghanistan, including Penguin Books' study guides about Afghan-related books.

It was selected as part of the first Afghan art exhibit show in the British Museum opened by then Afghan president Hamid Karzai.

== Synopsis ==
The film is divided into 16 days, with the director focusing each day on a different issue facing the Afghan people.

Day 1: He arrives in Kabul Airport and meets the family. A short introduction of the history of Afghanistan.

Day 2: He visits the Blue Mosque of Mazar-e Sharif and discusses the situation with the caretakers, guards, and the ulemas who are there. An inside look into the historical artifacts of the mosque. An interview with a westerner who visited Afghanistan in the 1970s and discusses Islam and the Taliban.

Day 3: Interview with the colonel of the Afghan National Army about the status of women in Afghanistan. Interview with a businesswoman who sells mantu on the street. Interview with street children testing their education and questioning them about school. Interview with a traffic police on how the economy has effected the number of cars and drivers.

Day 4: Interviews with a kebab seller and an electronic seller about their business. Interview with a street woman and her view about the government and president Hamid Karzai. Interview with a blind street singer. He has his fortune read by a woman fortune teller.

Day 5: Interview with a doctor and pharmacist about medicine and foreign medical aid in Afghanistan. Interview with a sickle-maker about his business and what he thinks of life.

Day 6: Interview with a former representative of Iranian cinema about her perception of the people. Interview with a street photographer, comparing standard film to digital photography. Interview with a butcher and his customer about business and health.

Day 7: On the way to Kabul, he eats and introduces Afghan cuisine. Interview with a UN representative and employee about UN activities in Afghanistan. The representative discusses land mines and how they affect people's lives. Hajher recalls his last days in Afghanistan during the Cold War.

Day 8: Interviews with many day laborers and how the current political and economic system affects their lives.

Day 9:Interview with the founder of Afghan Human Rights Committee about the involvement of United States and western powers in Afghanistan and terrorism.

Day 10: Hajher visits an illegal local hashish bar to interview hashish sellers, users and addicts. People discuss why they smoke, how it affects their lives and why they don't drink alcohol.

Day 11: Visiting the businesses in the popular Chicken Street and how it has changed or remain the same over the years. Interview with the sellers and western visitors who speak about the culture of Afghanistan.

Day 12: Hajher visits his village to meet his extended family. Greetings and interviews with the family about religion, politics and the way of life in the United States.

Day 13: Hajher faces death for a moment when he thinks that his village barber is going to cut his neck. The head of the village, the religious figure and other known figures come to meet and question him.

Day 14: He visits his dad's enemy to make peace and visit his old house which was taken over by the enemies of his father.

Day 15: Leaving Afghanistan, farewell to family and friends.

Day 16: Landing in the United States Augusta, Georgia airport. A montage of his recollections of the people he met and the places he visited.

== Cast and crew ==
The film is directed by Anwar Hajher, an Afghan-American anthropologist and current Afghan cultural advisor and professor in Georgia. Mithaq Kazimi has produced the film. The score is composed by Ahmad Shah Hassan and Larry Porter with additional music by Hariprasad Chaurasia.

Cast include Peace Corps volunteers, spokesperson for the Afghan National Army, former representative of Iranian cinema in Afghanistan and former western photographers and professional working in Afghanistan. The film also includes interviewees with the Afghan people from bread sellers to fortune tellers to heroin users to doctors to Mullahs to UN officials and ordinary school children.

== Cultural heritage ==
In 2011, the film was selected by the National Museum of Afghanistan in partnership with the National Geographic as an object of cultural heritage and will be showcased alongside other cultural artifacts in exhibitions around the world. The first of such exhibition was the Afghanistan: Crossroads of the Ancient World in the British Museum March–May, 2011.

== Impact ==
16 Days in Afghanistan has also been shown in many television stations, film festivals and non-profit events around the world. It is in circulation in many public school and university libraries. It has become one of the major and key documentaries about Afghanistan and is used by many people and organizations as a resource. Some include the official study guide from Penguin Group for Khaled Hosseini's novel, A Thousand Splendid Suns.

The China International Television Corporation have used the documentary to explore and better understand the culture of Afghanistan to conduct their videoconferencing on Afghanistan.

The Center for Afghanistan Studies and Academy of International Studies of the Jamia Millia Islamia university held screenings and discussions on the film.

Afghan critics and scholars have hailed the film for being neutral to the political and tribal issues while other documentaries often take sides. Wasef Bakhtari, renowned poet and historian has commented on the ability of the director to speak both Pashtu and Dari natively, while also communicating perfectly in English. Other publications covering the film and the filmmakers include a through interview in Peyk magazine.

Many publications have reviewed and discussed the film thoroughly, mostly in Afghanistan, but also some in the west. Cine Source mentions 16 Days in Afghanistan as one of the two distinguished documentaries made in Afghanistan after the Taliban era. Another states that the film has something for everyone. One publication discusses the film in comparison to more recent film, the Raindance-selected Where My Heart Beats.

In 2009, 16 Days in Afghanistan opened a two-day film festival on Afghanistan in India sponsored by the Embassy of Afghanistan, India Habitat Centre and Nelson Mandela Centre for Peace and Conflict Resolution. Other films in the series were The Beauty Academy of Kabul, The Afghan Chronicles, Beyond Belief and the recent Sundance selection, Afghan Star.

In 2011, the film was shown in the British Museum in the United Kingdom in partnership with the National Museum of Afghanistan and the National Geographic.
