= Siddiq Barmak =

Afghan film director and producer

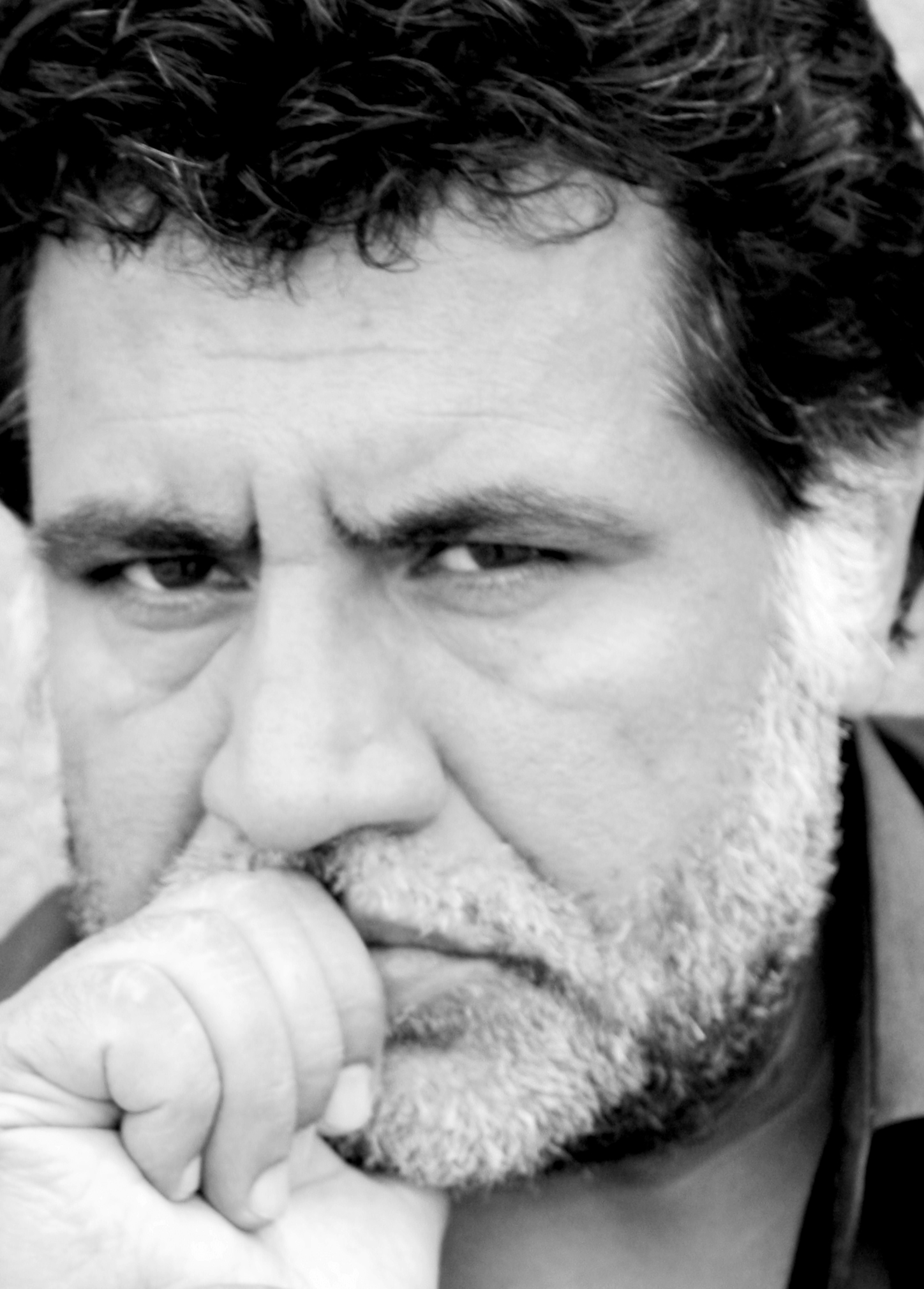
- Born: September 7, 1962 (age 64); Panjshir, Kingdom of Afghanistan
- Occupations: film director, screenwriter, film producer

Siddiq Barmak (Persian: صدیق برمک, born September 7, 1962) is a film director and producer. In 2004, Barmak won Best Foreign Language Film at the Golden Globes for his first feature film, Osama. He received an M.A. degree in cinema direction from the Moscow Film Institute (VGIK) in 1987. He is an ethnic Tajik from Panjshir, Afghanistan.

== Osama ==
There is a stylistic echo in Osama featured in Afghan films by the Iranian Makhmalbaf dynasty. Barmak directed Osama with significant funding and assistance from Mohsen Makhmalbaf. The Iranian director invested in the film, lending Barmak his Arriflex camera and encouraging him to send the movie to international festivals, which eventually generated further funding from Japanese and Irish producers. Barmak received "UNESCO’s Fellini Silver Medal" for his drama, Osama, in 2003.

== Afghan Children Education Movement ==
Barmak is also director of the Afghan Children Education Movement (ACEM), an association that promotes literacy, culture and the arts, which was also founded by Makhmalbaf. The school trains actors and directors for newly emerging Afghan cinema. Barmak is one of the celebrated figures in Iranian cinema as well as the emerging cinema of Afghanistan.

== Awards ==
Siddiq Barmak's debut feature film Osama (2003) received numerous international awards. Barmak won the Golden Globe Award for Best Foreign Language Film in 2004 for Osama. The film also received a Special Mention for the Caméra d'Or at the 2003 Cannes Film Festival. Other awards for Osama included the Sutherland Trophy at the London Film Festival, the Golden Spike at the Valladolid International Film Festival, and the Grand Jury Prize at the Miami International Film Festival.

His second feature film, Opium War (2008), won the Golden Marc'Aurelio for Best Film at the Rome Film Festival. Barmak has also received the Order of Arts and Letters from the French Ministry of Culture and the Federico Fellini Silver Medal from UNESCO.

== Filmography ==
He has written screenplays, made short films and produced a number of films.

- Divar - (1984) director
- Circle - (1985) director
- Bigana - (1987) director
- Uruj - (1995) script writer
- Osama - (2003) director
- Kurbani - (2004) executive producer
- Earth and Ashes - (2004) co-producer
- Opium War - (2008) director
- Apple from Paradise (2008) - producer
- Neighbor (2009) executive producer
