= List of Afghan Americans =

This is a list of Afghan Americans, including both original immigrants from Afghanistan who obtained American nationality and their American descendants. To be included in this list, the person must have a Wikipedia article showing that they are Afghan American or must have independent references showing that they are Afghan American and are notable.

== Academia and science ==
- Ali Ahmad Jalali (born 1940, Kabul), Distinguished Professor at the National Defense University in Washington, D.C.; former Afghan ambassador to Germany
- Hafiz Sahar (born 1928, Laghman), Professor of Journalism in Afghanistan and USA, Fulbright Scholar, Author, Editor-in-Chief of Eslah national newspaper of Afghanistan and author of "Luqman e Hakim"(1972) and "Television in Afghanistan"(1967)
- Mohammad Qayoumi (born 1952, Kabul), former President of San Jose State University
- Nake M. Kamrany (born 1934, Kabul), professor at the University of Southern California (USC) and economist
- Adib Farhadi (born 1972, Kabul), assistant professor at University of South Florida and coordinator of USF's Executive Education Program; the former Afghanistan Deputy Minister of Commerce
- Nazif Shahrani (born Badakhshan), professor of anthropology at Indiana University
- Ishaq Shahryar (born 1936, Kabul), Afghan Ambassador to the United States from 2002 to 2003

== Arts and entertainment ==
- Leena Alam (born 1978, Kabul), actress in television, film, and theater, human rights activist
- Sonia Nassery Cole (born 1965, Kabul), human rights activist, filmmaker, and author
- Zohra Daoud (born 1954, Kabul), television host and Miss Afghanistan 1974
- Josh Gad (born 1981), actor, comedian, and singer whose father is an Afghan Jew
- Sameer Asad Gardezi, screenwriter and television writer
- Mariam Ghani (born 1978), multi-media visual artist, photographer, filmmaker, human rights activist; of Afghan–Lebanese descent
- Azita Ghanizada (born 1979, Kabul), actress and television host
- Donnie Keshawarz (born 1969), Canadian-born American stage, film and television actor; of Afghani–Canadian descent
- Mahaley Patel (born 1987), actress, singer, songwriter; her father is from Afghanistan
- Aman Mojadidi (born 1971), visual artist
- Annet Mahendru (born 1985), actress of Indian-Russian descent
- Vida Samadzai (born 1978, Kabul), actress, model, Miss Afghanistan 2003, and Beauty for a Cause of Miss Earth 2003
- Jawed Wassel (1959–2001, Kabul), filmmaker
- Abeal Siddiq, American born actor to parents from Kabul, Afghanistan

== Business ==
- Hafizullah Emadi (born Shibar), independent scholar and development consultant for Focus Humanitarian Assistance
- Masuda Sultan (born 1978), entrepreneur, international human rights advocate, and memoirist

== Literature ==
- Tamim Ansary (born 1948, Kabul), author
- Khaled Hosseini (born 1965, Kabul), author of three books including the Kite Runner, activist, humanitarian, and UNHCR goodwill ambassador

== Media and journalism ==
- Hafiz Sahar (born 1928, Laghman), Professor of Journalism in Afghanistan and USA, Fulbright Scholar, Author, Editor-in-Chief of Eslah national newspaper of Afghanistan
- Nabil Miskinyar (born 1948, Kabul), television anchor for Ariana Afghanistan
- Fariba Nawa (born 1973, Herat), journalist and author

== Music ==
- Sonita Alizadeh (born 1996, Herat), rapper and activist
- Ehsan Aman (born 1959, Lashkargah), musician
- Farhad Darya (born 1962, Kabul), musician
- Qader Eshpari (born 1967, Kabul), soft rock singer
- Qais Essar, rabab musician, songwriter
- Naim Popal (born 1954, Kabul), musician
- Haidar Salim, musician
- Farid Zoland (born 1951, Kabul), musician

== Politics and civil service ==
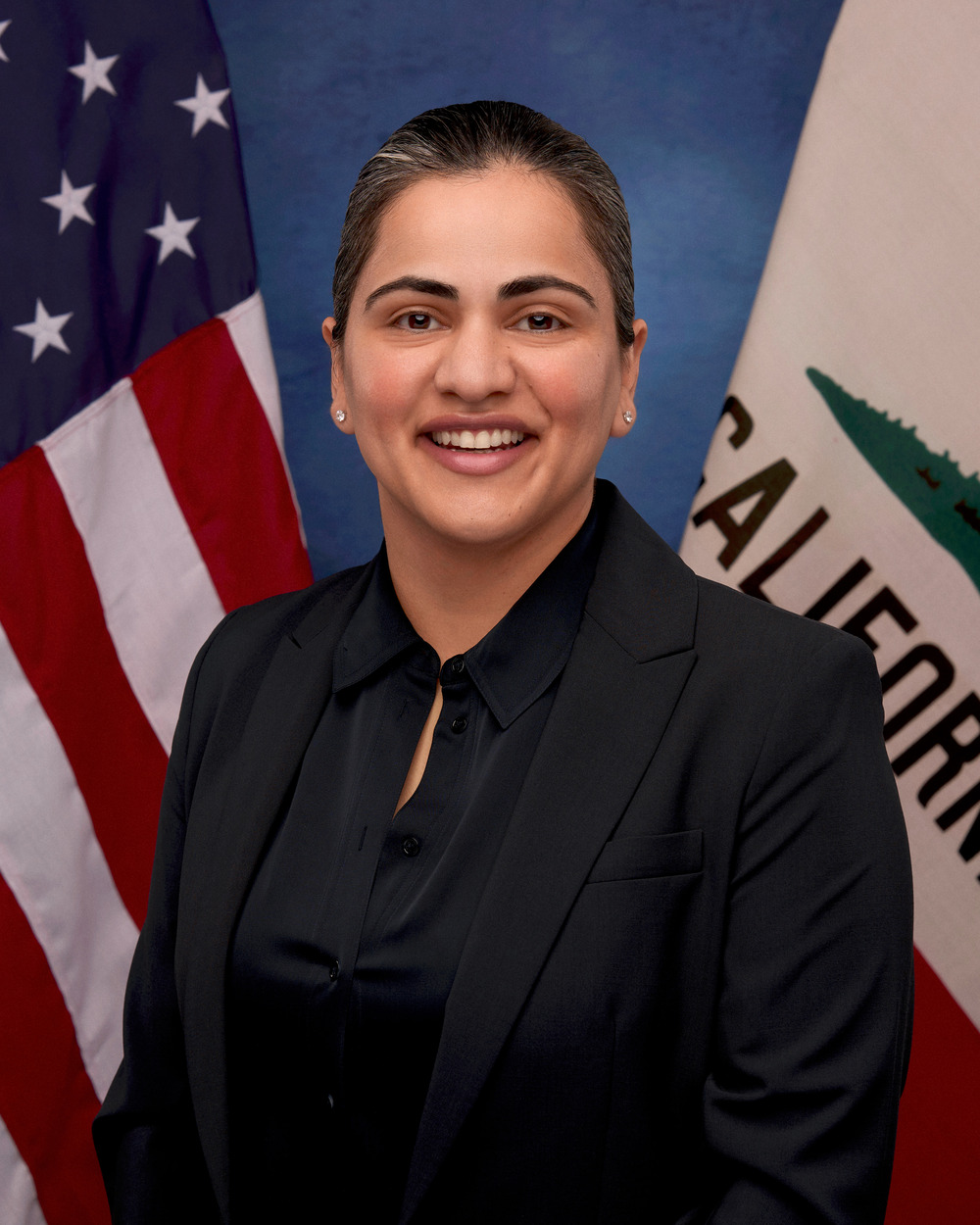
Aisha Wahab, Member of the U.S. House of Representatives from California's 14th district

- Ashraf Ghani (born 1949, Logar), 14th President of Afghanistan
- Mohammed Kahn (1823-26 May 1891), also known by John Ammahaie, was Afghan-American soldier in the American Civil War.
- Ahmed Wali Karzai (born 1961, Karz), politician in Afghanistan until his death in 2011
- Zalmay Khalilzad (born 1951, Mazar-i-Sharif), United States Special Representative for Afghanistan Reconciliation from 2018 to 20211, United States Ambassador to the United Nations from 2007 to 2009, United States Ambassador to Iraq from 2005 to 2007, United States Ambassador to Iraq from 2004 to 2005
- Nadia Hashimi (born 1977), Democratic congressional candidate for the United States House of Representatives for Maryland's 6th congressional district, pediatrician, and novelist
- Laili Helms, former Taliban supporter and public speaker
- Ahmad Yusuf Nuristani (born 1947, Nuristan), politician, Governor of Herat Province in Afghanistan from 2009 to 2010
- Safi Rauf (born 1994), Navy reservist and aid worker held captive by the Taliban
- Mariam Solaimankhil (born 1984), member of House of the People from 2019 to 2021
- Stephen J. Townsend (born 1959), West German-born American four-star general of Afghan–German descent, commanding general of U.S. forces during the War on ISIS / Operation Inherent Resolve
- Aisha Wahab (born 1987), Member of the U.S. House of Representatives from California's 14th district
- Safiya Wazir (born 1991, Baghlan), New Hampshire State Representative 2018–2022

== Other ==
- Wallace Fard Muhammad (c.1877–c.1934), founder of the Nation of Islam, mentor of Elijah Muhammad
- Niloofar Rahmani (born 1992, Logar), former Afghan female pilot
- Shaesta Waiz (born 1987), Afghan-born pilot and the first female certified civilian pilot, and the youngest woman to fly solo around the world in a single-engine aircraft
- Najibullah Zazi (born 1985, Paktia), convicted Al-Qaeda member

== See also ==
- List of Afghans
- Pashtuns
- Pashtun diaspora
