= Afghan Americans =

Americans of Afghan birth or descent

د امريکا افغانان (Pashto) آمریکایی‌های افغان‌تبار (Dari)

Total population
- 219,257 (2023)

Regions with significant populations
- California (especially Sacramento and the East Bay), Virginia, Washington, D.C., New York (Queens), Texas (Dallas and Houston), Washington (Seattle), Arizona, Georgia (Atlanta), Missouri, Illinois (Chicago)

Languages
- English, Pashto, Dari, Tajik, Uzbek, Hazaragi

Religion
- Predominantly: Sunni Islam Minority: Shia Islam, Judaism, Hinduism, Sikhism, Christianity

Related ethnic groups
- Pashtun Americans, Afghan Australians, Afghan Canadians, Iranian Americans, Tajik Americans, Uzbek Americans

Afghan Americans (Note: Dari: امریکایی‌های افغان‌تبار, romanized: Amrīkāyīhā-yi Afǧān tabār, cyrillized: Амрикоиҳои Афғон табор, pronounced [ʔɐmɾiːˌkʰɑːjiːˈhɑːjɪ ʔɐvˈɣɑːn tʰɐˈbɑːɾ]; Pashto: د امريکا افغانان, romanized: Də Amrīkā Afǧānān, pronounced [də ʔɐmriˈkɑ ʔɐvɣɑˈnɑn]) are Americans with ancestry from Afghanistan. They form the largest Afghan community in North America. Afghan Americans may originate from any of the ethnic groups in Afghanistan.

The Afghan community in the United States was minimal until large numbers were admitted as refugees following the December 1979 Soviet invasion of Afghanistan. Others have arrived similarly during and after the latest war in Afghanistan. Afghan Americans reside and work all across the United States. The states of California, Virginia and New York historically had the largest number of Afghan Americans. Thousands may also be found in the states of Arizona, Texas, Georgia, Colorado, Washington, Oklahoma, Nebraska, Missouri, North Carolina, Maryland and Illinois.

== History and population ==
Afghan Americans have a long history of immigrating to the United States, as they have arrived as early as the 1860s. This was around the time when Afghanistan–United States relations were being established. Wallace Fard Muhammad claimed to have been from Afghanistan. A World War I draft registration card for Wallie Dodd Fard from 1917 indicated he was living in Los Angeles, California, as an unmarried restaurant owner, and reported that he was born in Shinka, Afghanistan in 1893. Between the 1920s and 1940s, hundreds of Afghans immigrated to the United States. Between 1953 and early 1970, at least 230 lawfully entered the United States. Some of them were students who had been granted scholarships to study in American universities.

=== Afghan refugees and the Refugee Act of 1980 ===
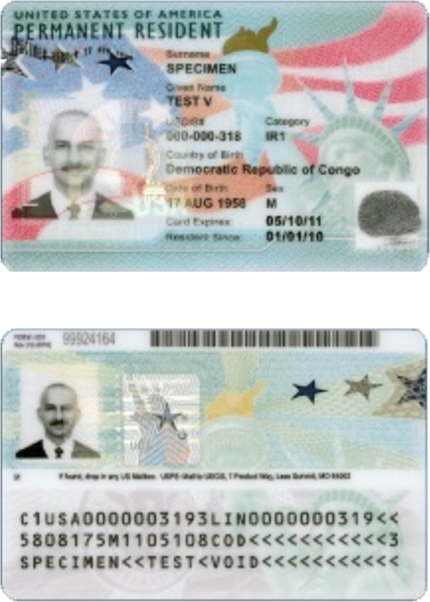
Afghan refugees statutorily become lawful permanent residents (green card holders) as of the date of their arrival into the United States.

After the 1979 Soviet invasion of Afghanistan, around five million Afghan citizens were displaced. They were compelled to secretly migrate to (or seek refuge in) other countries. These Afghan refugees or asylum seekers found temporary shelter in neighboring Pakistan and Iran, and from there thousands made it to Europe, North America, Oceania, and elsewhere in the world. Under the law, the ones born in Pakistan, Iran or India are not in any way Pakistanis, Iranians or Indians. Their birth certificates and other legal documents confirm that they are citizens of Afghanistan.

Beginning in 1980, Afghan Americans arrived into the United States as families. They were admitted as refugees or asylum seekers. In some cases a family was represented by only one parent due to the death of the other parent. They began settling in the New York metropolitan area, California (mainly in the San Francisco Bay Area and the Los Angeles-Orange County area) and in other parts of the United States, where large Muslim community centers keep them bonded. Fremont, California, is home to the largest population of Afghan Americans followed by Northern Virginia and then Queens in New York City. Smaller Afghan American communities also exist in the states of Texas, Arizona, Oklahoma, Washington, Georgia, Michigan, Idaho, Missouri, Illinois, Pennsylvania, Florida, North Carolina, Massachusetts, Maryland, Connecticut, Colorado, Ohio, Utah, New Mexico, Oregon, Tennessee and so on. In the city of Chicago, the 2000 census counted 556 Afghan Americans, approximately half of them within the city.

The first arrivals of Afghan families in the early 1980s were mainly the wealthy and from the urban and educated elite. They had rightfully applied for refugee status while temporarily residing in Pakistan and India, and a large number had similarly resided in Germany before their firm resettlement in the United States. The family reunification program brought in less affluent communities from rural Afghanistan, many of which were illiterate and maintained a more traditional village lifestyle.

=== Child Citizenship Act of 2000 ===
Those admitted under 8 U.S.C. § 1157 and becoming green card recipients under 8 U.S.C. § 1159(a) are statutorily protected against inadmissibility, even if they are not in possession of their green cards, Afghan passports, Afghan identity cards, or any other legal document. In addition to that privilege or benefit, whenever one parent becomes naturalized all of his or her children statutorily become entitled to naturalization through such American parent. This conferral of American nationality statutorily extends to all of his or her children that are born outside of the United States. All such nationality claims are statutorily reviewable under the federal judiciary of the United States.

Post September 11, 2001, Afghans faced discrimination in the United States. President Bush's plan to issue work permits to help the economy came to a halt after the terror attack in 2001. It interrupted talk of legalizing immigrants, thus leading to few admitted immigrants from 2001 to 2005. 406,080 immigrant visas were issued in 2001. 395,005 were issued in 2005 according to the Department of Homeland Security.

=== Afghan Allies Protection Act of 2009 ===
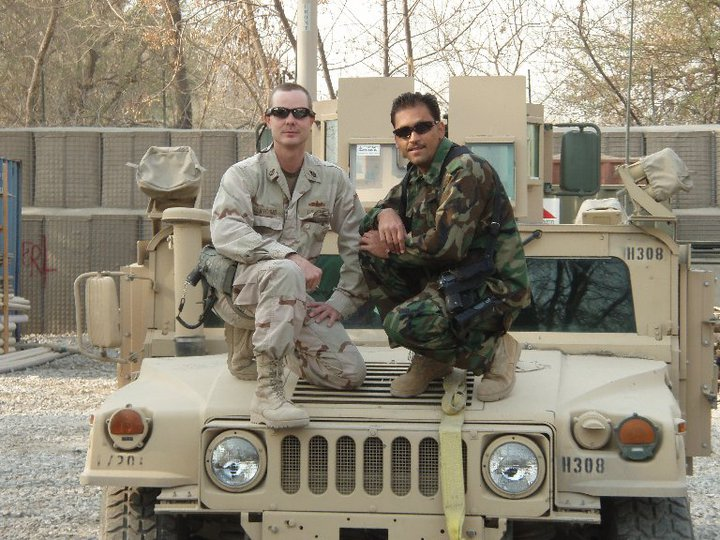
A U.S. soldier with an Afghan American interpreter in Jalalabad, Nangarhar Province, Afghanistan.

A news reporter in 2001 randomly stated, without providing any references or sources, that there were 200,000 Afghan Americans. This wild assumption probably included Afghan Canadians. According to the U.S. Census Bureau, there were approximately 65,972 Afghan-Americans in 2006. The American Community Survey (ACS) estimated a total of 94,726 Afghan foreign-born immigrants were residing and working in the United States in 2016, which shows a 30% increase in the last ten years. Since 2005, thousands of Afghans have been admitted to the United States under the Special Immigrant Visa (SIV) program. Congress passed the Afghan Allies Protection Act of 2009, which was extended in 2014. Afghans who had put their lives at risk during the US-led war in Afghanistan became eligible for SIVs. This program for Afghans created a legal pathway towards U.S. citizenship for the recipients and their immediate family members.

=== Evacuations of 2021 ===
Afghan refugees resettled per 100K residents after the 2021 Afghan withdrawal and evacuation in each U.S. state and the District of Columbia according to CBS News

Large numbers of Afghans, including those that worked with the United States, moved to the country following the Taliban take over of Kabul in August 2021.

Of the more than 100,000 Afghan nationals who have moved to the United States since August 2021, it has accepted more than 1,600 unaccompanied children, the Department of Health and Human Services' Office of Refugee Resettlement records show.

As many as 150,000 Afghans who assisted the United States remained in Afghanistan, including individuals who worked closely with US military forces.

=== Discrimination of Refugees ===
Afghans who went through resettlement difficulties may experience discrimination, worsening the trauma. Afghans still continue to flee from Afghanistan and still struggle to find refuge, most recently on July 15 Canada had closed its Special Immigration Measures Program. Afghans who were relying on this program may face death or persecution due to being stuck in Afghanistan, especially since this program targeted former employees of the Canadian Armed Forces, the Canadian Governments and their families.

== Culture ==
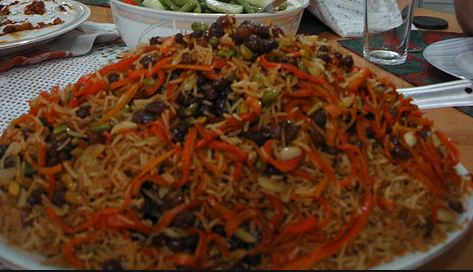
Qabuli palaw is a traditional rice dish topped with sweet carrots, raisins, sliced almonds and served usually with lamb, beef or chicken.

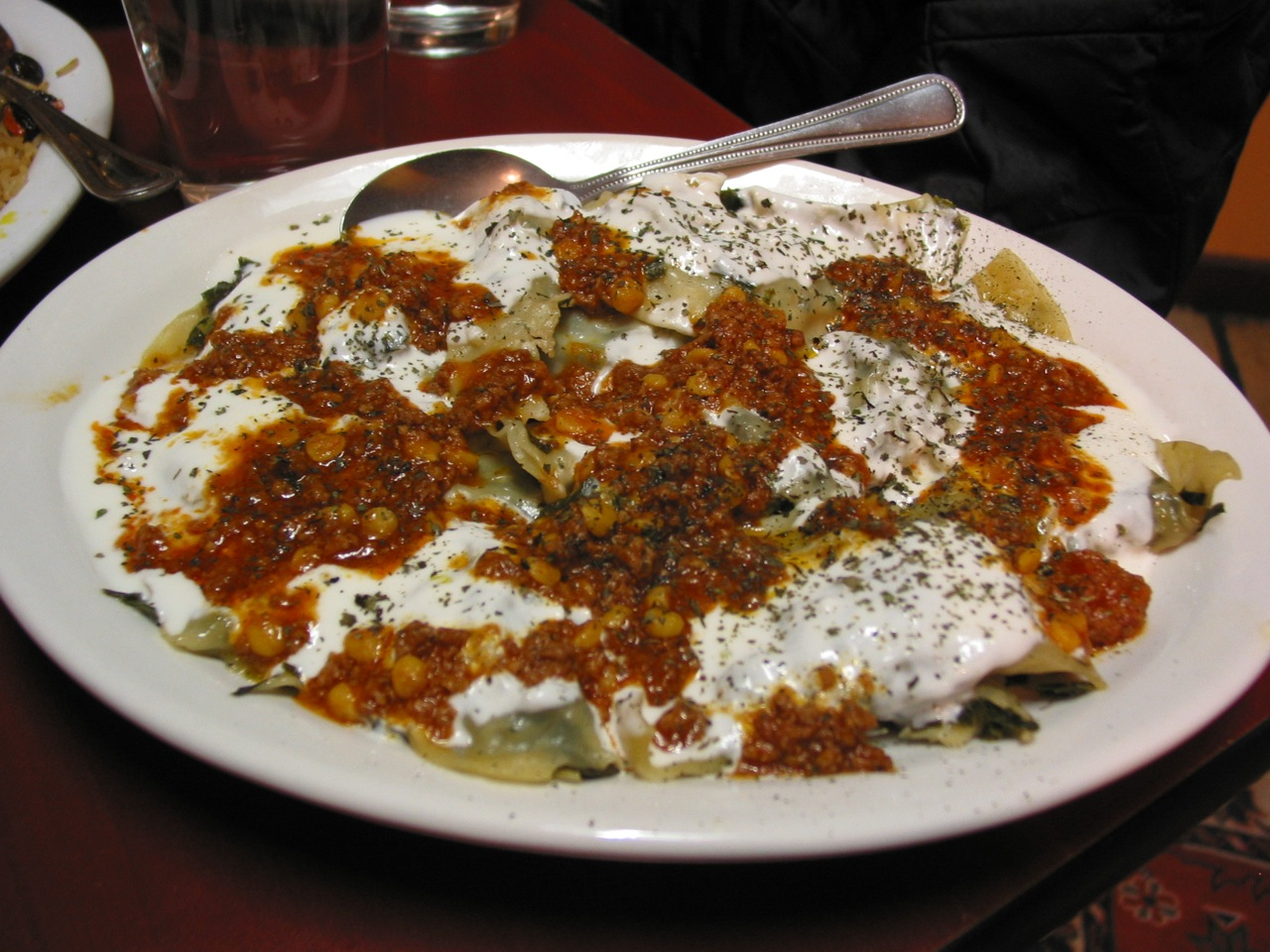
Traditional dish aushak served at an Afghan restaurant in California

As other immigrants in the United States, Afghan Americans have gradually adopted the American way of life. But many of those who were born in Afghanistan still highly value Afghan culture. For example, they often wear at home Afghan clothes, watch Afghan shows, listen to Afghan music, eat mostly Afghan food, and enthusiastically keep up with Afghan politics. They also value their oral tradition of story telling. The stories they sometimes tell are about Mullah Nasreddin, Afghan history, myths and religions.

Afghan Americans celebrate August 19 as Afghan Independence Day, which relates to August 1919, the date when Afghanistan became fully independent after the signing of the Anglo-Afghan Treaty. Small festivals are held in cities that have Afghan communities, usually at the parks where black, red and green colored Afghan flags are spotted around cars. Eid and Nowruz remain popular festivals for Afghans. The 2021 American sitcom United States of Al featured American and Afghan culture.

A The Washington Post article from October 2001 claims that the Afghan-American community, "concentrated in the towns of Fremont and Hayward, is in many ways a microcosm of the country that's nearly a dozen time zones away." Various members of the community commented that the Afghan community, following conflicts and divisions at home, are still divided in the United States, but that they all share love for their home country.

=== Ethnicity and race ===
Afghan Americans are composed of the various ethnic groups that exist in Afghanistan, which include Pashtun, Tajik, Hazara, Uzbek, Turkmen, Baloch, and a number of others. In 1945, Afghan Americans were officially classified as Caucasians. For census purposes, Afghans are currently racially categorized as White Americans. In recent years the creation of a new census category called SWANA (which includes Afghan Americans) has been proposed in an effort for more accurate categorization.

=== Religion ===
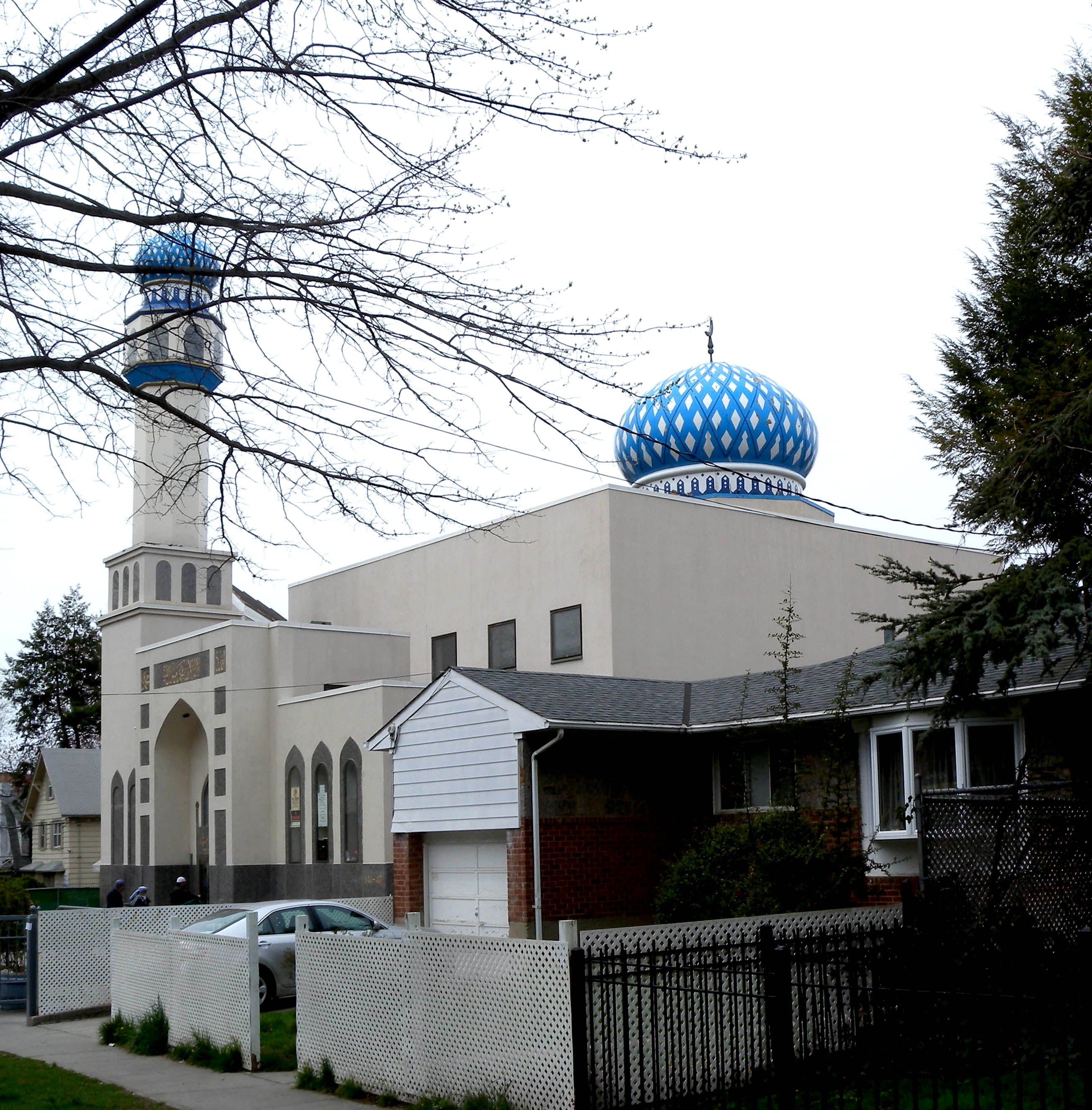
The Hazrati Abu Bakr Siddique Mosque in Flushing, Queens, New York City

The majority of Afghan-Americans are Muslims whom follow Sunni Islam, with a sizable community of Shia Muslims. Many Afghan Americans residing in Northern Virginia are members of the All Dulles Area Muslim Society, which has a number of local branches. After the September 11 attacks in 2001, a mosque run by Afghan-Americans in New York City donated blood, held a vigil for those who died inside the World Trade Center (WTC) and funded a memorial for the New York City fire fighters.

There is a community of Afghan Jews in New York City, numbering about 200 families in 2007. A group of Afghan Americans in the Los Angeles area follow Christianity. Hussain Andaryas is an Afghan Christian televangelist who belongs to the Hazara ethnic group. Outside of the Abrahamic faiths, there exists a community of Afghan Hindus and Afghan Sikhs. They are mainly found in the states of New York and Maryland.

=== Media ===
Afghan Americans have formed media outlets dedicated for its diaspora. Examples include television channels such as Ariana Afghanistan, Payam-e-Afghan, Tuti TV, and Pamir TV. In the 1990s, Afghanistan TV broadcast on KSCI Channel 18 in Los Angeles and as well as magazines like the Afghanistan Mirror. Many organizations have also been formed for Afghan youth, solidarity, women's rights and more. Recently a new radio station has also launched named Radio Afghan Los Angeles. In 2020, "Afghanistan by Afghans" a TV show and podcast was started by Misaq Kazimi, showcasing the voices of Afghan artists, thinkers and cultural keepers. The show is also showcased on Zarin TV.

== Demographics ==
=== Immigration ===
According to estimates from the Migration Policy Institute website for 2017–2021, there were 118,500 Afghan immigrants in the United States. The counties or county-equivalents with the most Afghan immigrants were as follows:

Afghan immigrant population by county
Rank	County	State	Population
1	Sacramento County	California	15,400
2	Alameda County	California	7,200
3	Fairfax County	Virginia	6,400
4	King County	Washington	4,700
5	Contra Costa County	California	4,500
6	Prince William County	Virginia	4,300
7	Los Angeles County	California	3,800
8	Orange County	California	3,600
9	San Diego County	California	3,300
10	Bexar County	Texas	3,100
11	Queens County	New York	2,700
12	San Joaquin County	California	2,200
13	Stanislaus County	California	1,900
14	Travis County	Texas	1,800
15	Alexandria (city)	Virginia	1,800
16	Riverside County	California	1,800
17	Tarrant County	Texas	1,700
18	Prince George's County	Maryland	1,700
19	Maricopa County	Arizona	1,600
20	Nassau County	New York	1,500
21	Loudoun County	Virginia	1,500
22	Harris County	Texas	1,500
23	Dallas County	Texas	1,100
24	Albany County	New York	1,100

=== Economics ===
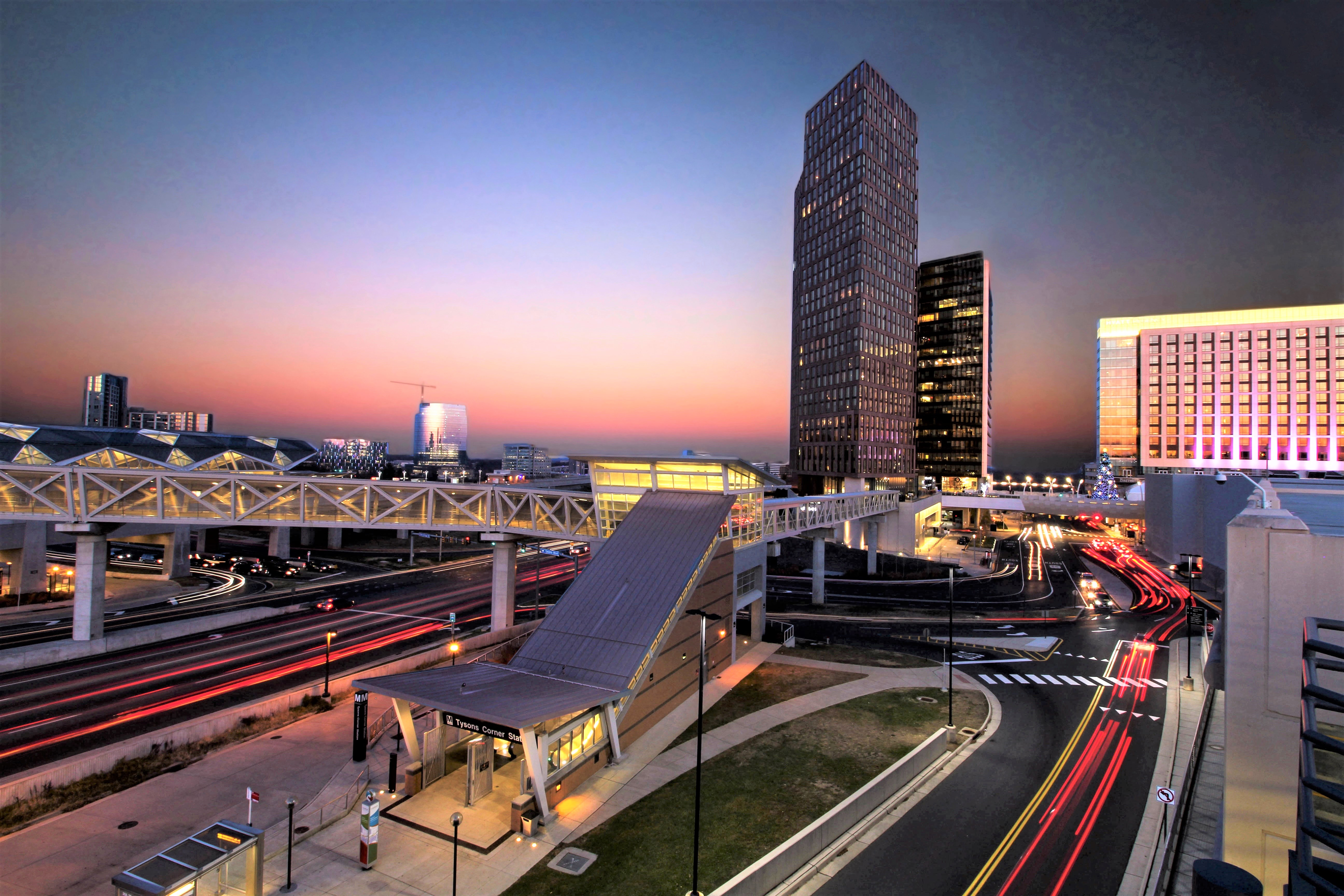
Northern Virginia has a large Afghan American work force

Many Afghan Americans own real estate in Afghanistan, which in some cases have been lawfully inherited from their earliest ancestors for generations upon generations. Afghan Americans who arrived before the 21st century are mostly found residing near other middle class Americans. Some may be found living in the upper middle class neighborhoods and earning high salaries.

Because the majority of Afghan Americans were originally admitted as refugees under 8 U.S.C. § 1157, the government provided various forms of assistance (welfare) and selected their city of residence. Some decided to move to other cities that had larger Afghan communities but most remained in the cities where they first arrived. They gradually left the government assistance programs and eventually mortgaged homes. Their children were sent to colleges or universities. Those who could not achieve this decided to build or franchise small businesses. Others became real estate agents, bank employees, office workers, hotel workers, store clerks, salespersons, security guards, drivers, mechanics, waiters, etc.

Like many other immigrants in the United States, Afghan Americans often engage in the operation of small businesses. Many operate American and Afghan restaurants as well as Afghan markets, while some have been reported in the 1990s as vendors in Manhattan where they have replaced Greek Americans in the field.

The family incomes of Afghan Americans (specifically, those that were termed "refugees") was a median of $50,000 in 2015. This figure is higher than Mexican Americans, Cuban Americans and slightly higher than Hmong Americans, but lower than Vietnamese Americans.

=== Education ===
Afghan immigrants that were admitted to the United States before 1979 were well educated. In contrast, current immigrants have escaped from totalitarianism, genocide, torture, persecution, mistreatment, and military conflicts. This group has had some trouble coping with learning the English language. Those who have pursued their education in America during the middle of the 20th century and traveled back to Afghanistan faced trouble attaining employment when returning to the United States since their education, often in medicine and engineering, is frequently viewed as outdated. After the 1979 Soviet invasion, Afghanistan's education system worsened, causing many migrants in the late 20th century to place less emphasis on educational attainment.

== Notable people ==
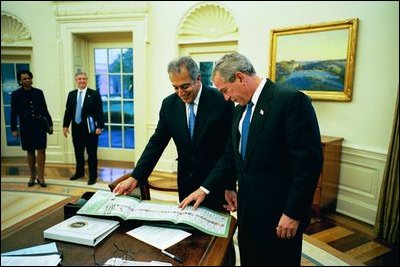
Zalmay Khalilzad with George W. Bush in 2004

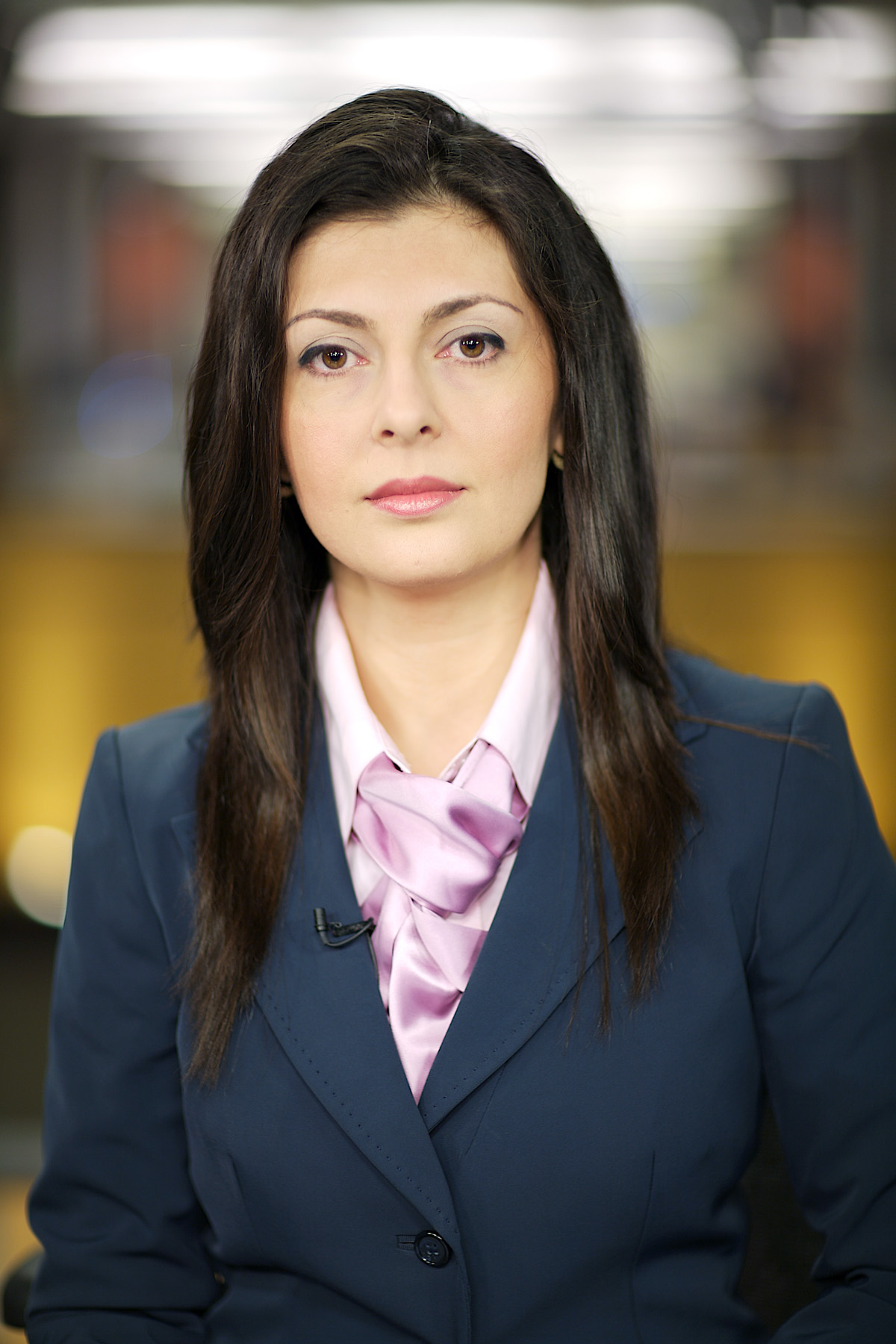
Lina Rozbih, Senior Editor and television personality at Voice of America

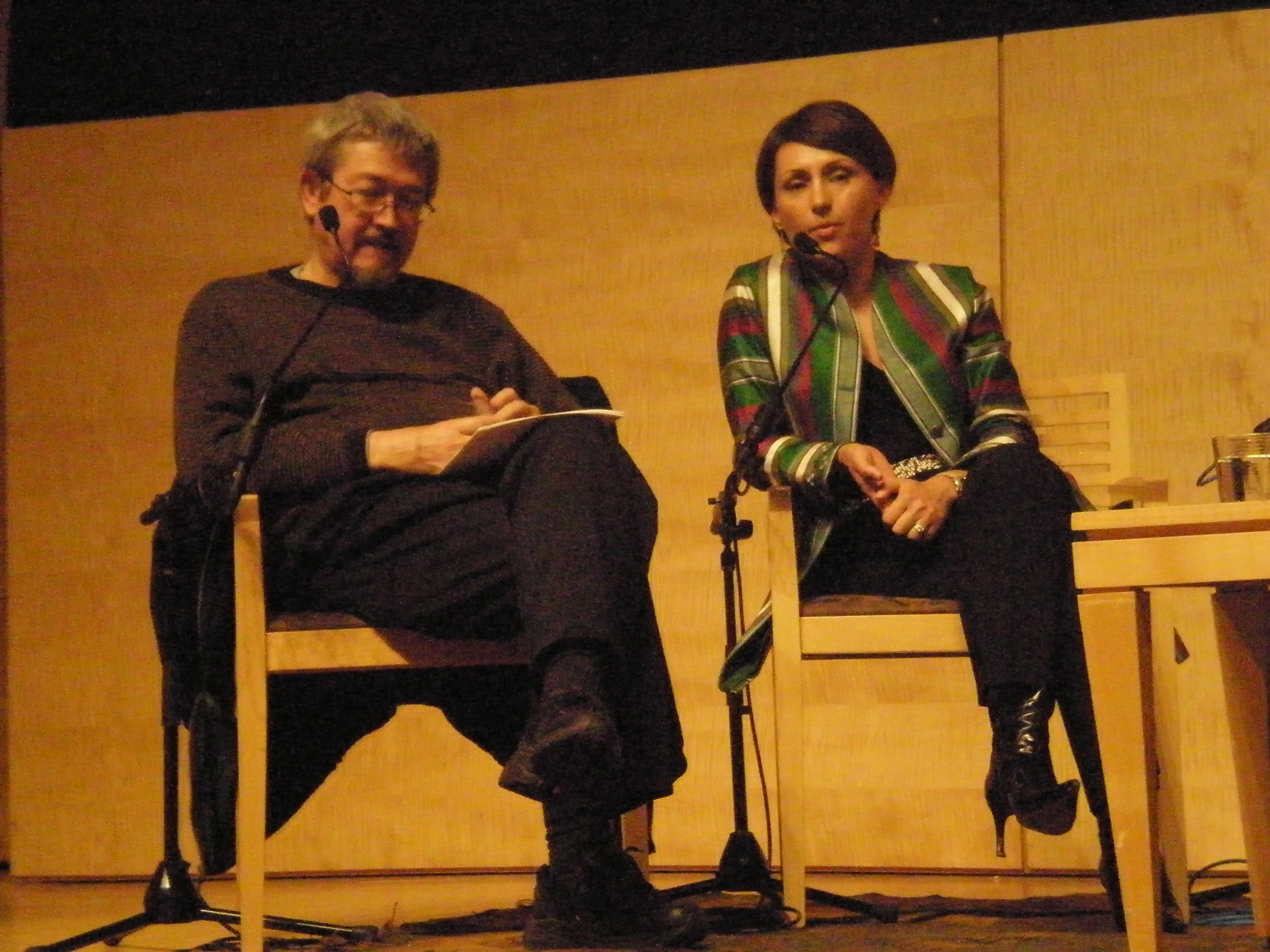
Author Tamim Ansary and activist Humaira Ghilzai

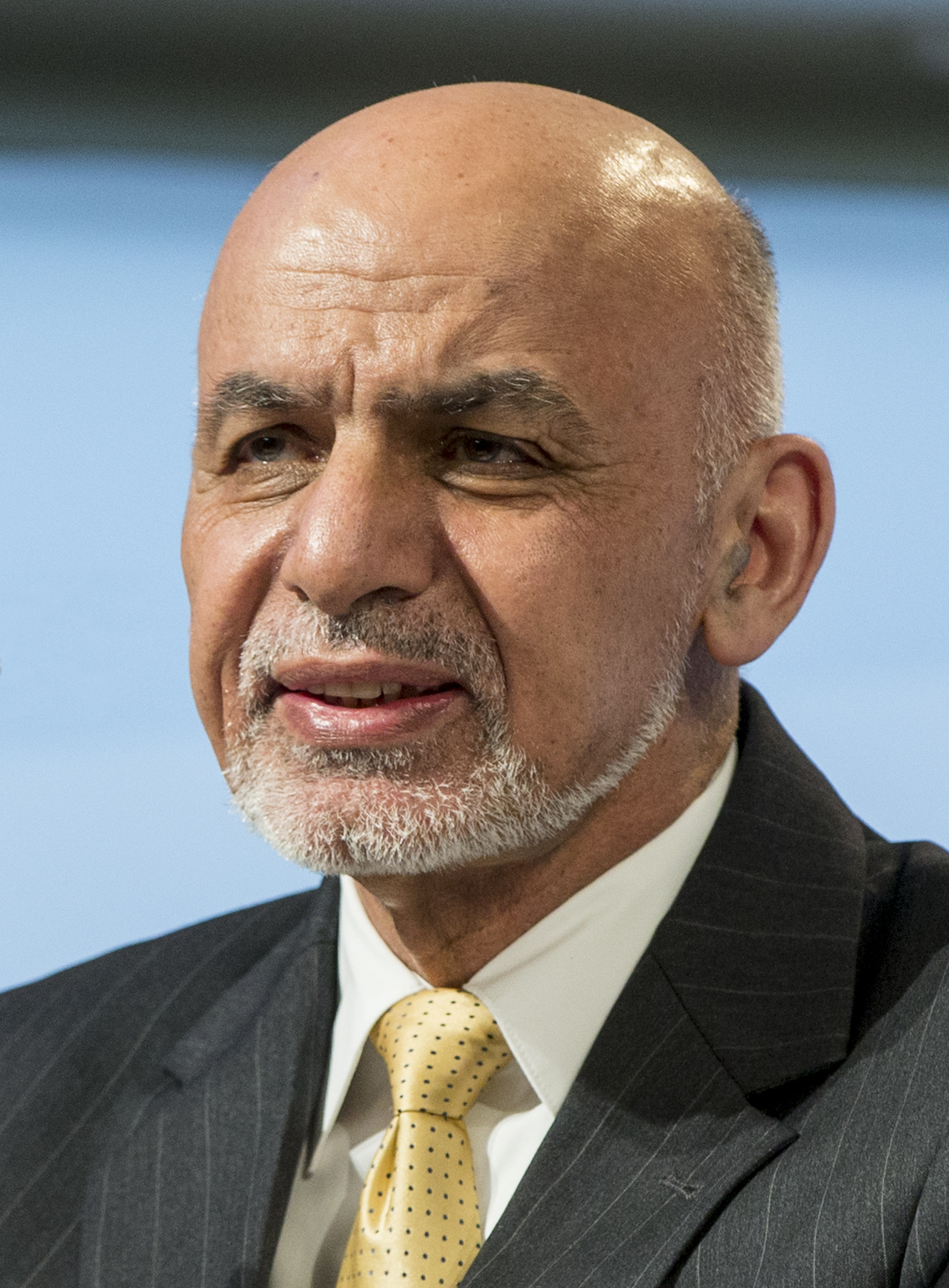
Ashraf Ghani, the 5th President of Afghanistan

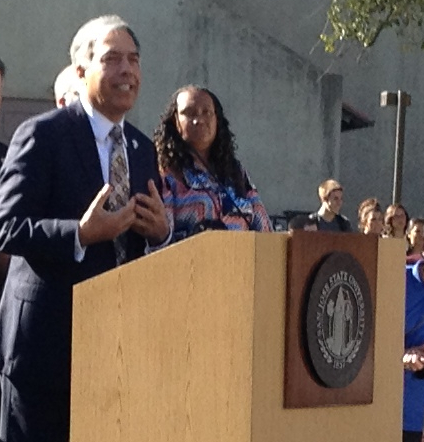
Mohammad Qayoumi served as President of San Jose State University and California State University, East Bay

=== Politics, academia and literature ===
- Zalmay Khalilzad, U.S. Ambassador to the United Nations from 2007 to 2009
- Ashraf Ghani, 5th President of Afghanistan
- Ali Jalali, Distinguished Professor at the National Defense University in Washington, D.C.; ex-Afghan diplomat
- Mohammad Qayoumi, former President of San Jose State University and California State University, East Bay
- Safiya Wazir, member of the New Hampshire House of Representatives
- Aisha Wahab, member of the United States House of Representatives
- Ajmal Ahmady, politician in Afghanistan
- Said Tayeb Jawad, Ambassador of Afghanistan to the United States from 2003 to 2010
- Nazif Shahrani, professor of anthropology at Indiana University
- Ishaq Shahryar, Afghan Ambassador to the United States from 2002 to 2003
- Wali Karzai, professor of Bio-Chemistry at Stony Brook University
- M. Ishaq Nadiri, professor of economics at NYU and signatory at 2001 Afghanistan Bonn conference
- Nake M. Kamrany, professor of economics at University of Southern California
- Haris Tarin, rector of Muslim Public Affairs Council ( MPAC)
- Tamim Ansary, author of West of Kabul, East of New York, a book published in 2001, shortly after the "9-11" attacks.
- Khaled Hosseini, best-selling author whose work includes The Kite Runner and A Thousand Splendid Suns
- Fariba Nawa, author of Opium Nation and journalist
- Qais Akbar Omar, author of A Fort of Nine Towers and co-author of Shakespeare in Kabul
- Safi Rauf – Taliban captive and nonprofit founder
- Hamid Naweed, author and art historian
- Leila Christine Nadir, writer and artist
- Ghulam Haider Hamidi, former Mayor of Kandahar
- Hafizullah Emadi (born Shibar), independent scholar and development consultant for Focus Humanitarian Assistance

=== Business and finance ===
- Mahmoud Karzai – Brother of former Afghan President Hamid Karzai and owner of Afghan cuisine restaurant
- Qayum Karzai – Brother of former Afghan President Hamid Karzai and owner of Afghan cuisine restaurants in the Southern California and Baltimore–Washington Metropolitan Area
- Ehsan Bayat – Business entrepreneur who founded Afghan Wireless

=== Sports ===
- Hailai Arghandiwal - Association football (soccer) player who plays for German club Duisburg and the Afghanistan national team.
- Adam Najem – Association football player who plays as a midfielder for Canadian Premier League club FC Edmonton, and the Afghanistan national team.
- David Najem – Association football player who plays as a defender for USL Championship club New Mexico United and the Afghanistan national team
- Ahmad Hatifi – Association football player who is a midfielder and currently plays for CD Aguiluchos USA
- Mohammad Mashriqi - Association football player
- Alex Hinshaw – Former baseball pitcher
- Jeff Bronkey – Former baseball player
- Shamila Kohestani - Former soccer player and founder of the first women's national soccer team

=== Media and art ===
- Azita Ghanizada – Actress and TV host, she appeared in a number of films and TV shows
- Donnie Keshawarz - Canadian-American stage, film and television actor of Afghan descent
- Sonia Nassery Cole – Actress and director
- Anwar Hajher – Filmmaker and professor, 16 Days in Afghanistan
- Youssof Kohzad – Artist, Poet, Painter and Actor
- Annet Mahendru – Actress, she appeared in a number of films and TV shows
- Nabil Miskinyar – Television anchor
- Jawed Wassel – Writer/Director of first Afghan Oscar contender Feature Film called FireDancer.
- Josh Gad – Actor appearing in Frozen and Jobs. Afghan-Jewish father.
- Leena Alam – Actress from Kabuli Kid, Loori, Soil and Coral, and The Unknown
- Fahim Fazli – Actor who appears in various films, such as Iron Man
- Robert Joffrey – born Abdullah Jaffa Bey Khan is known for co-founder of the Joffrey Ballet
- Aman Mojadidi – Artist whose art focuses on Afghan politics and cross-cultural identity

=== Musicians ===
- Omar Akram – Pianist who won a Grammy award for best new age album
- Farhad Darya – Afghan musician
- Jawad Ghaziyar – Afghan musician
- Rahim Jahani – Afghan musician
- Naim Popal – Afghan musician
- Ahmad Wali – Afghan musician
- Aziz Herawi - Afghan musician
- Naghma - Afghan musician
- Ehsan Aman - Afghan musician

=== Beauty pageant contestants ===
- Zohra Daoud – Miss Afghanistan 1974
- Vida Samadzai – Beauty for a Cause of Miss Earth 2003

=== Afghan royalty ===
- Ahmad Shah Khan, Crown Prince of Afghanistan and Khatul Begum, Princess of Afghanistan

=== Other ===
- Hevad Khan – Professional Poker player
- Zahira Zahir - Sister of Afghan singer Ahmad Zahir. Known for cutting the hair George W. Bush, among others.
- Niloofar Rahmani – the first female fixed-wing Air Force aviator in Afghanistan's history
- Razia Jan - head of non-profit education organization in Afghanistan
- Shamim Jawad - Women's rights advocate and aid worker
- Zarif Khan was an Afghan who arrived in United States at the age of twelve in 1907. He was also known as Hot Tamale Louie.

== See also ==
- Central Asians in the United States
- Afghan diaspora
- Anti-Afghan sentiment
- Afghanistan–United States relations
- Demographics of Afghanistan
- 2025 Washington, D.C., National Guard shooting
- Deportation of Afghan immigrants from the United States
- Pashtun Americans
