= Ecoarttech =

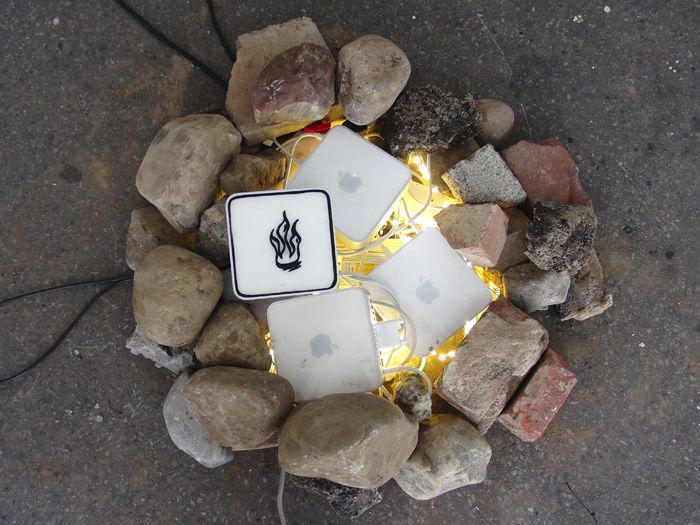
Computer-Campfire Installation detail, 2013 ecoarttech (Leila Nadir + Cary Peppermint)

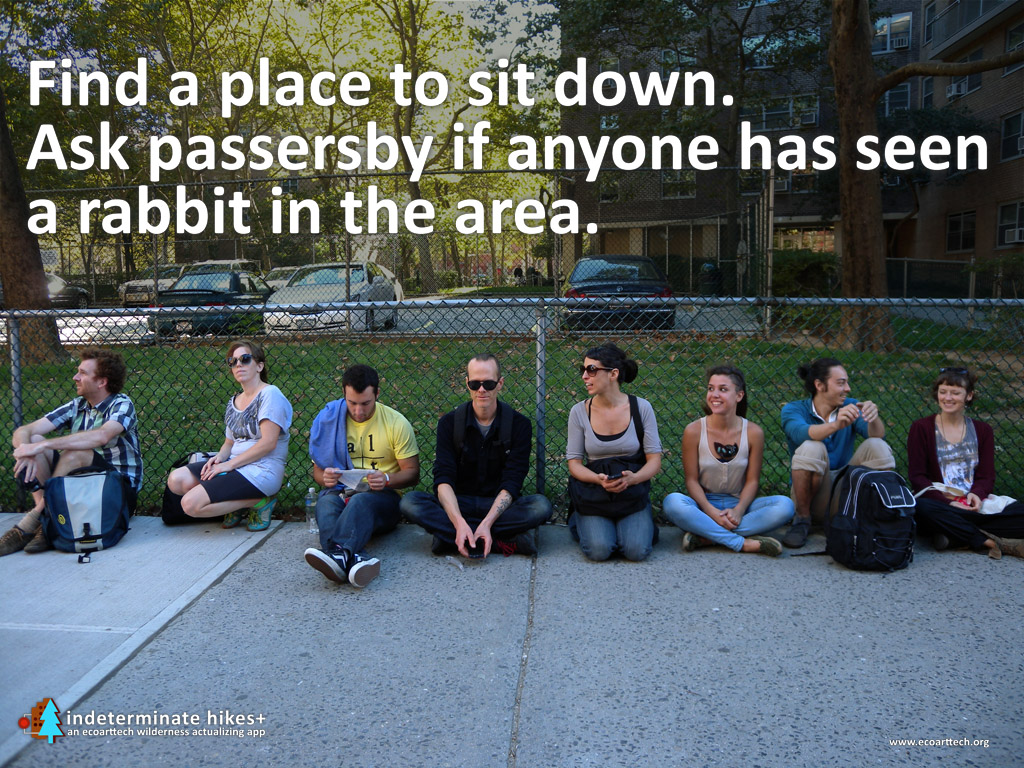
Indeterminate Hikes+ iPhone/Android app, 2012 ecoarttech (Leila Nadir + Cary Peppermint)

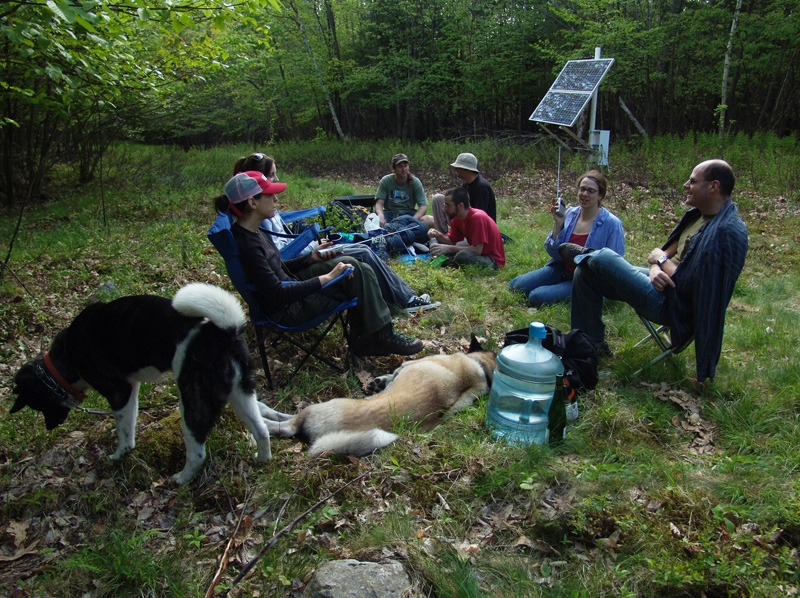
Opening party of Wilderness Information Network, Catskill Mountains, New York State, 2006 ecoarttech (Leila Nadir + Cary Peppermint)

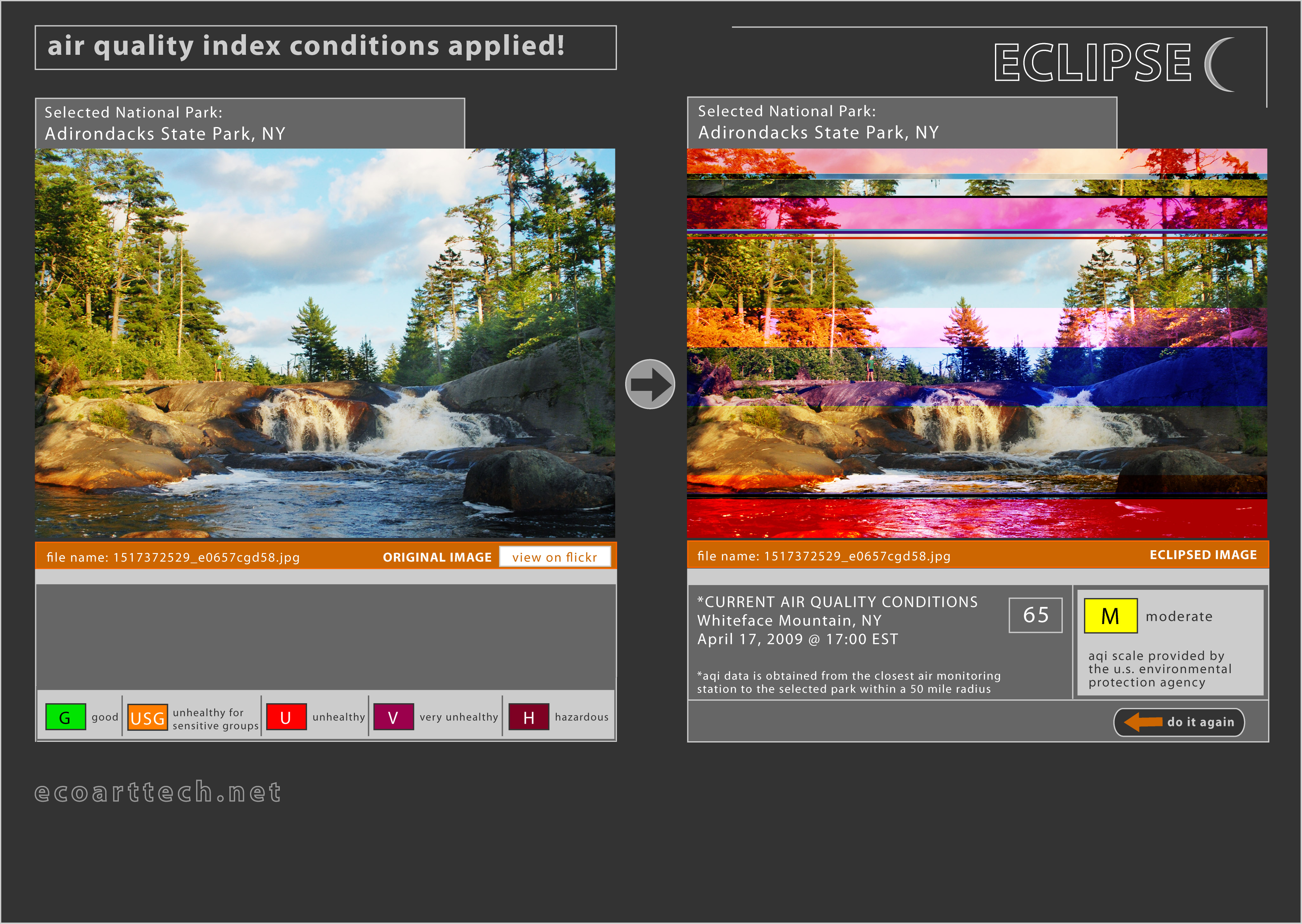
Eclipse Turbulence.org commission, 2009 ecoarttech (Leila Nadir + Cary Peppermint)

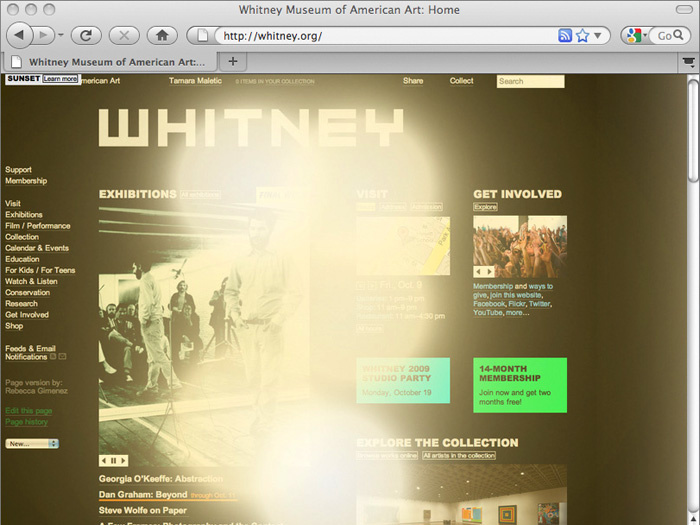
Untitled Landscape #5 Whitney Museum of American Art Commission, 2009 ecoarttech (Leila Nadir + Cary Peppermint)

Ecoarttech is an experimental, postdisciplinary, mixed media environmental art collaborative founded in 2005 by artist Cary Peppermint and literary writer/critic Leila Christine Nadir. The collaborative explores the complex relationships between modernity, technologies, networks, and concepts of nature and culture. Merging primitive with emergent technologies, ecoarttech’s work investigates the overlapping terrain between “nature,” built environments, mobility, and electronic spaces. In furtherfield.org, Sophia Kosmaoglou writes, "Refusing to regard technology merely as a tool, Ecoarttech expand the uses of mobile technology and digital networks revealing them to be fundamental components of the way we experience our environment... By drawing our attention to the increasing replacement or mediation of physical experiences by technology, Ecoarttech challenge the widely reproduced distinction between nature and culture." In visualMAG, Teresa de Andrés describes the artists as "determined to blur the frontiers between city and countryside by using technologies in a creative way... they invite us to lose ourselves in unexplored lands, sinuous urban alleys and arid mountains to the south of the Earth.

== Eclipse ==
In 2009, ecoarttech launched "Eclipse," an internet-based work commissioned by Turbulence of New Radio and Performing Arts, Inc. and Untitled Landscape #5, a digital environmental artwork commissioned by the Whitney Museum of Art, as part of the Sunrise/Sunset series inaugurated in 2009. In 2010, ecoarttech worked with the University of North Texas on a work exploring the Trinity River Basin of North Texas and unique, man-made waterbody called Soil Conservation Services Hickory Creek Basin Retarding Pond 16.

== Indeterminate Hikes+ ==
In 2011, ecoarttech released Indeterminate Hikes+, a mobile phone app that they say "imports" the rhetoric of wilderness into everyday life through Google-mapped hiking trails, the app attempts to inspire a sense of ecological wonder at usually disregarded spaces, such as city sidewalks, alleyways, and apartment buildings." In an interview, they reported their goal to be the following: "We wanted to see what would happen if a walk down a sidewalk were treated as a wilderness excursion. What if we consider the water dripping off an air-conditioner with the same attention that we give a spectacular waterfall in the wilderness?"

== Awards ==
Ecoarttech's research has been awarded a New York Foundation for the Arts Digital/Electronic Arts Fellowship, New York State Council on the Arts Media Arts Distribution Grant, Andrew Mellon Foundation Post-Doctoral Fellowship, and Franklin Furnace Performance Grant.

== Locations exhibited ==
They have exhibited and lectured at the Whitney Museum, University of California, Los Angeles, MIT Media Lab, Banff New Media Institute, European Media Art Festival, Neuberger Museum of Art, and the Centro de Arte Contemporáneo de Málaga. Their works are in the collections of the Whitney Museum of American Art, the Walker Art Center, Rhizome.org at the New Museum, Turbulence.org of New Radio and Performing Arts, and the Cornell University Rose Goldsen Archive of New Media Art. In 2012, Cortijada Los Gazquez creative retreat released two videos of collaborations conducted with ecoarttech in southern Spain.

== Creator info ==
Nadir earned her PhD in literature from Columbia University and was Mellon Post-Doctoral Fellow of Environmental Humanities at Wellesley College in 2010-2011. Peppermint is Assistant Professor of Digital Art at University of Rochester, where Nadir also teaches humanities courses in the sustainability and digital studies programs.
