= Letter to the President =

Letter to the President may refer to

- Letter To The President (song), 1999 song by Tupac Shakur.
- A Letter to the President, 2017 film by Roya Sadat.
