= Soil Conservation Services Hickory Creek Basin Retarding Pond 16 =

Lake in Texas, U.S.

Coordinates: 33.2391°N 97.1545°W

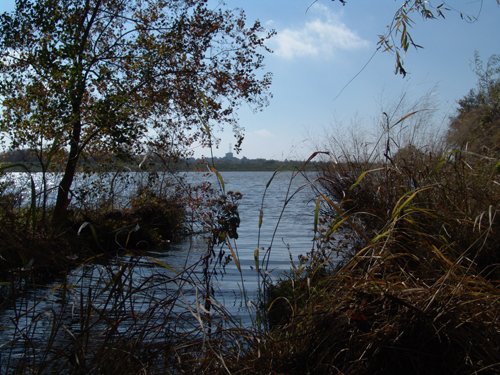
Soil Conservation Services Hickory Creek Basin Retarding Pond #16, a.k.a. Little Lake

Little Lake is the local name given to Soil Conservation Services Hickory Creek Basin Retarding Pond #16 (SCS #16) within Denton, Texas and the Trinity River Basin. Originally constructed in 1975 as a retention / detention pond to prevent flooding, the Lake soon exceeded its capacity as a hydraulic infrastructure, attracting wildlife and becoming host to vibrant cultural and ecological diversity.

The flood hazard areas of Denton County are subject to periodic inundation which result in loss of life and property. These flood loses are created by the cumulative effect of obstructions in the floodplain which cause an increase in flood heights and velocities, and by the occupancy of flood hazard areas by uses vulnerable to floods and hazardous to other lands because they are inadequately elevated, floodproofed or otherwise protected from flood damage." –City of Denton Public Works, Planning Division

In 1957 and 1962, flooding devastated downtown Denton's business district and surrounding neighborhoods, and the construction of SCS #16, or Little Lake, was introduced in 1966 as part of the Hickory Creek flood prevention plan. This plan proposed seventeen hydraulic structures that would prevent such massive flooding events, protecting homes and businesses. Only nine were completed, two in Denton: #16 (a.k.a. Little Lake) and #17a. North Lakes Park encompasses both man-made, retention / detention ponds within a 351-acre (1.42 km^{2}) plot of land. The official entrance to the park is at 2001 W. Windsor, which leads to the more developed SCS #17a, which includes a range of amenities from a recreation center and batting cage to lighted football fields and playgrounds.

Little Lake, or Retarding Pond #16, located in the south side of the park and accessed via North Bonnie Brae Street, is decidedly less developed and for this reason has attained a sense of wildness despite its man-made origins. Without recreational structures to prescribe visitors' experiences, Little Lake has become host to a diverse biological and cultural ecology. Animals, both human and nonhuman, define the environment, using and enjoying its shores for a wide range of activities that enrich and maintain their lives. Kayakers, fishermen, great blue herons, trees, egrets, beavers, dogs, hikers, and disc golfers share the space, crossing each other's paths. As a result, Little Lake represents a unique amalgam of hydraulic infrastructure, ecological habitat, and nature retreat, all in one. Located within the Dallas–Fort Worth metroplex, the largest metropolitan area in Texas and the fourth-largest in the United States, this hybrid wild-urban environment offers the opportunity to learn how environmental management and bio-cultural diversity might intertwine.

In 2010, the ecological environment of Little Lake became the subject of an artistic collaboration between the New York-based art team ecoarttech (founded by Cary Peppermint and Leila Christine Nadir) and University of North Texas (UNT) faculty and students. In conjunction with the WaterWays 2010 Conference and the Fluid Frontier exhibition and symposium, the ecoarttech-UNT project, titled "Center for the Wildness in the Everyday," explores how this "wild," man-made lake transcends categories of nature and culture, raising complex philosophical and political questions about environmental ethics, the role of water in supporting biological and cultural diversity, and the relationship between urban planning, environmental management, and local community involvement.

== Images ==
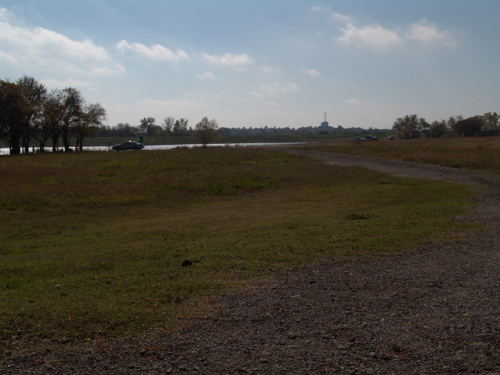

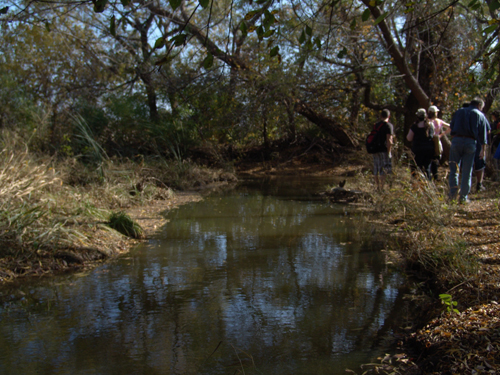

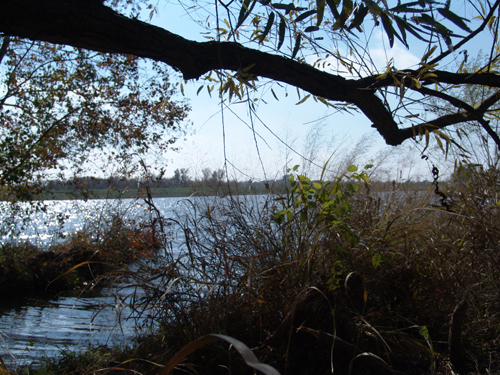

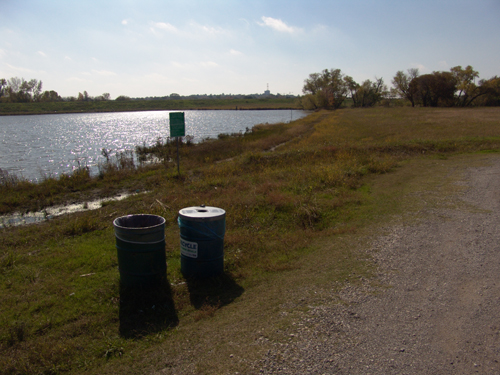

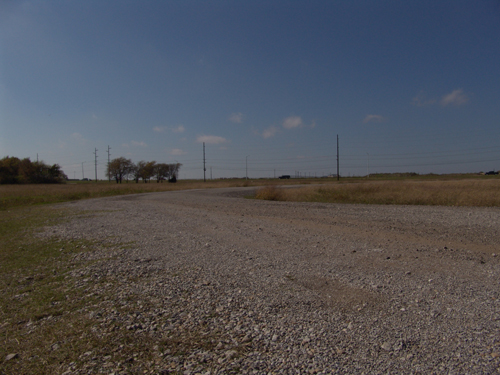

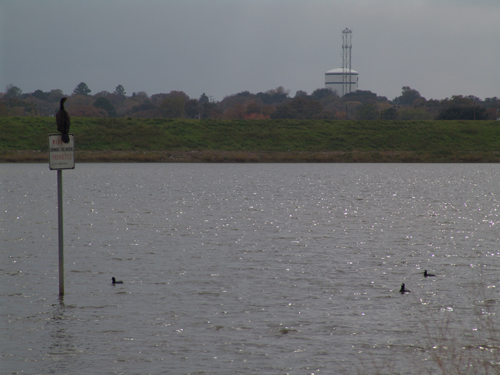

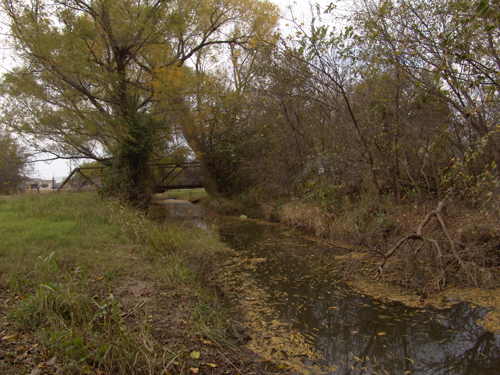

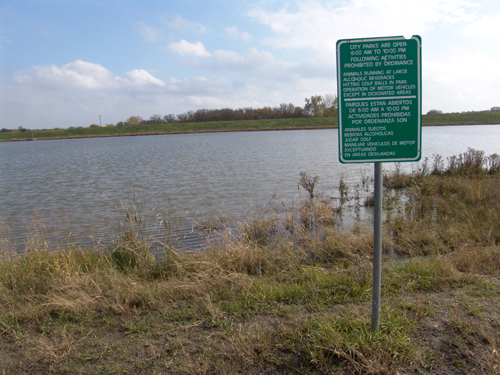

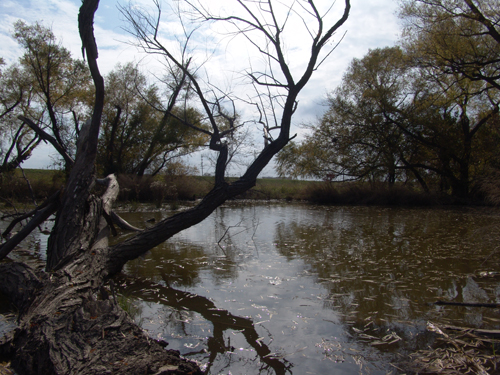

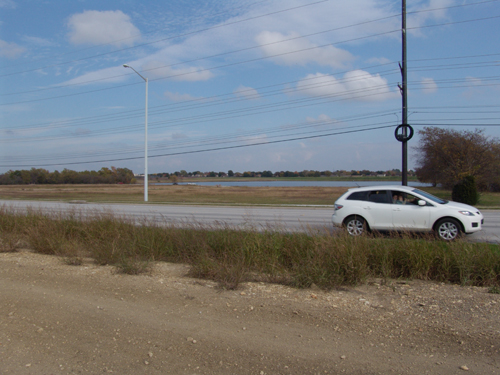

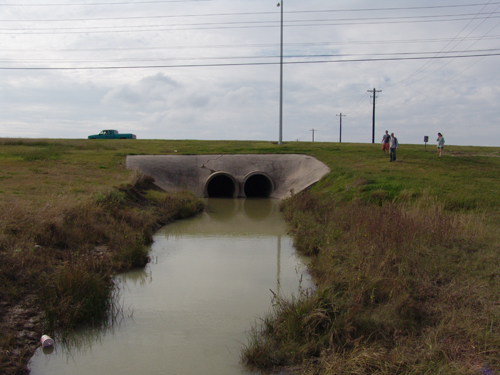

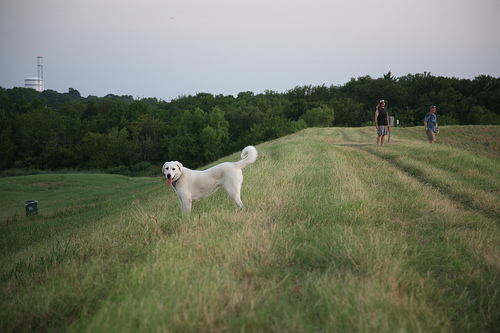

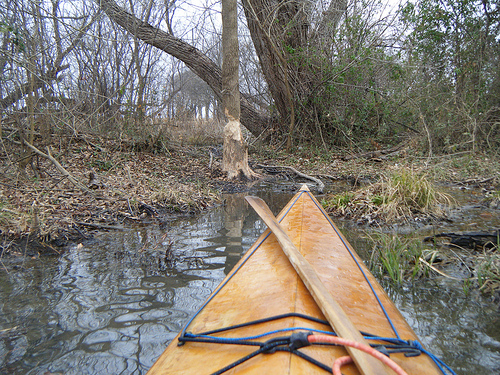

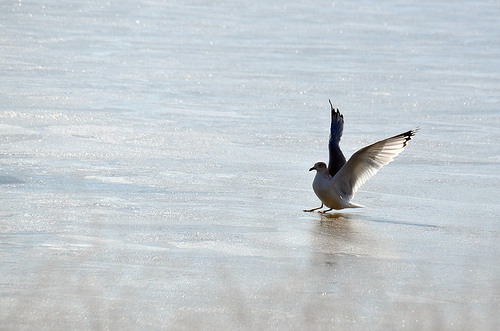

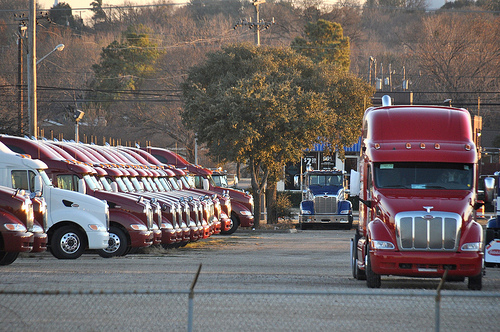

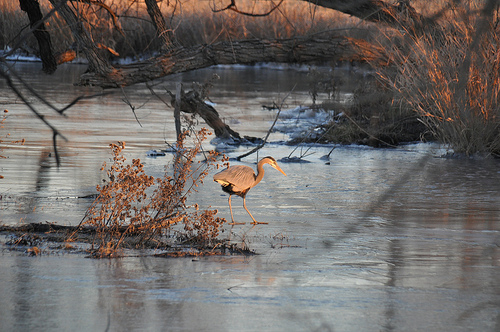
