= Black Kite (film) =

2017 film

- Film poster
- Directed by: Tarique Qayumi
- Written by: Tarique Qayumi
- Starring: Haji Gul Aser; Leena Alam
- Release date: 9 September 2017 (TIFF)
- Running time: 87 minutes
- Countries: Afghanistan; Canada
- Language: Dari

Black Kite is a 2017 Afghan-Canadian drama film written and directed by Tarique Qayumi and starring Haji Gul Aser and Leena Alam. The film was shot quickly over a fortnight in Afghanistan where they moved locations to avoid being stopped by the Taliban. The film was screened in the Contemporary World Cinema section at the 2017 Toronto International Film Festival.

== Plot ==
The film follows a man (Asur), his daughter (Alam), and his love of kites in the context of 50 years of Afghan history, including the banning of kite flying by the Taliban.

== Reception ==
Critics praised the "captivating story" and use of animation but criticized the film for its "charmless protagonist" and score.
