= Rahim Jahani =

Rahim Jahani رحيم جهانی
- Born: Rahim tabrizli
- Genres: Pop, Ghazal, Classical
- Occupation: Singer
- Years active: 1975–2014
- Labels: Various

Rahim Jahani (Persian: رحيم جهانی) was a well known veteran singer from Afghanistan's pre-revolutionary music era. At one point in his lifetime, Jahani resided in the Silo district of Kabul. He was twice married, latterly to the singer Salma Jahani.

Jahani died on November 29, 2014, in Sacramento, California. Jahani has two daughters and one son, the eldest being his daughter Salma Jahani, the 2nd eldest being Rahe Jahani, and the youngest being Sonbol Jahani. His best-known song is "Ishq-e-Man," (pers.: My Love), which continues to be sung.
