= Aman Mojadidi =

American artist of Afghan descent (born 1971)

- Born: 1971 (age 54–55); Jacksonville, Florida, United States
- Website: http://www.amanmojadidi.com/

Aman Mojadidi (born 1971) is an American visual artist of Afghan descent known for his public art projects exploring Afghan politics and cross-cultural identity. Mojadidi has referred to himself as "Afghan by blood, redneck by the grace of God." His work has been shown internationally in contemporary art exhibitions such as dOCUMENTA (13) and the Kochi-Muziris Biennale.

== Biography ==
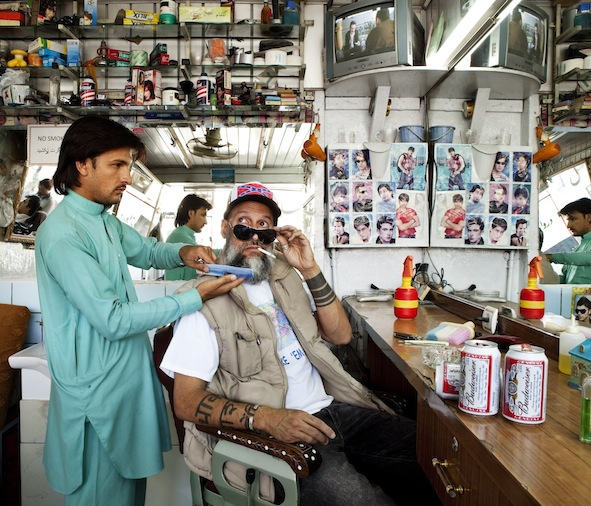
Afghan by Blood, Redneck by the Grace of God - Just a trim, 2011

Mojadidi was born and grew up in Jacksonville, Florida. His father went back to Afghanistan each summer to help fight the Soviet occupation as a combat surgeon. Mojadidi visited Afghanistan for the first time in 1990, when he made a visit to the front lines with his uncle, Sibghatullah Mojaddedi, the prominent Afghan mujahid who was once president of Afghanistan and has been a member of its upper parliament.

Mojadidi visited Afghanistan again in 2001 after the fall of the Taliban, and moved there in 2003 to work with an NGO involved in efforts to rebuild the country. In recent years he has been active in Kabul's art scene and has been credited for playing a crucial role in its resurgence. Mojadidi curated a 2012 Documenta exhibit in Kabul which showcased 12 contemporary Afghan artists, and has worked with young Afghans in graffiti art. At times he has been critical of Afghanistan's reliance on foreign aid. He has said that "a truly sustainable approach would probably be for Afghan artists to form collectives and organise exhibitions on their own initiative."

== Work ==
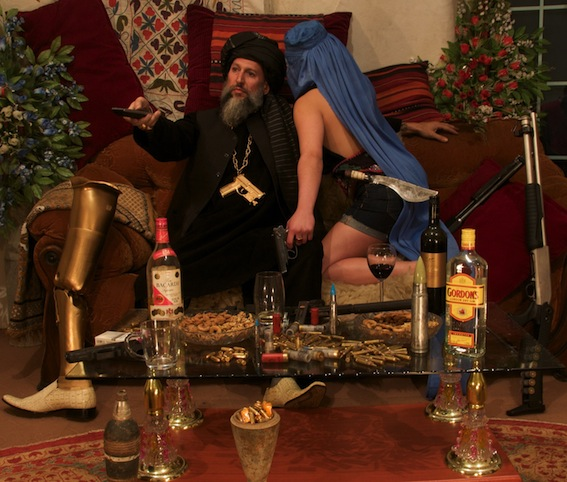
A Day in the Life of a Jihadi Gangster After a Long Day's Work, 2010.

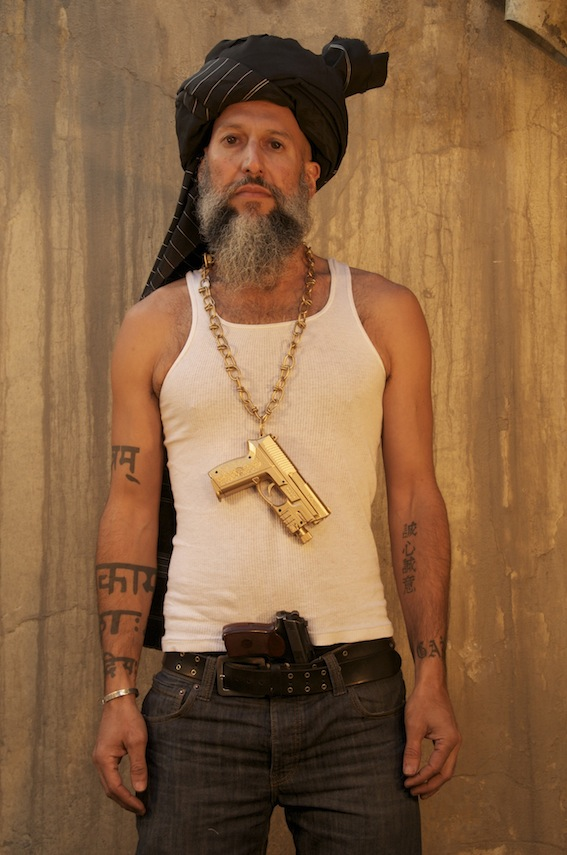
A Day in the Life of a Jihadi Gangster Dressing for Work, 2010.

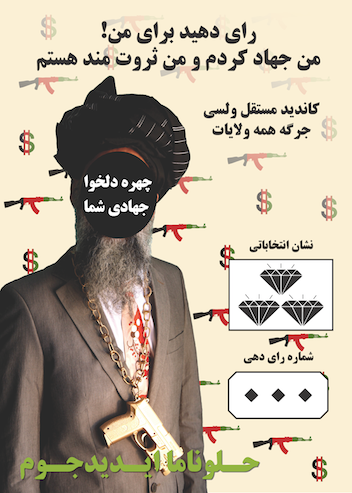
Parliamentary Campaign Poster, Jihadi Gangster in the 2010 elections.

With his art, Mojadidi says he aims to make something that "disturbs identity and challenges authority." For one of his first performance art installations, in 2009, Mojadidi set up a fake checkpoint in Kabul. Dressed as an Afghan policeman, he filmed himself searching cars and offering drivers $2, in what he described as a "reverse bribe."

In 2010, Mojadidi invented a character called the "Jihadi Gangster" as a satire of what he saw as jihad's "Street cred" (credibility) in modern Afghan culture, which he connected to the American concept of "bling." In a series of photos and posters, Mojadidi dressed up as this character, whose appearance was a combination of American hip-hop gangster and Afghan mujahideen. During the Afghan parliamentary election, 2010, Jihadi Gangster appeared in posters around Kabul wearing a black turban and a large gold chain with a gold-plated gun around his neck (see photos). His campaign slogan read, "Vote for me, I've done jihad, and I'm rich."

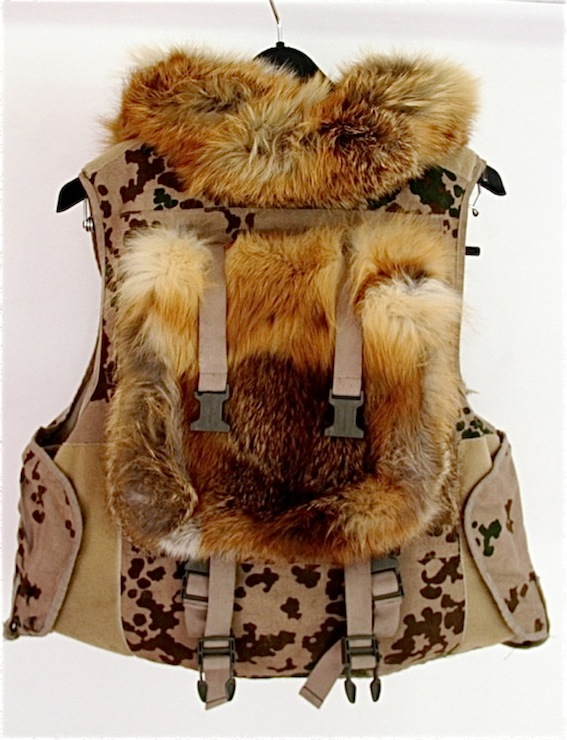
Conflict Chic 1 vest, 2011.

Mohadidi's other tongue-in-cheek work includes a fashion line of clothing for suicide bombers and soldiers called "Conflict Chic" and photography exploring the connection between Kabul City and the American Confederate South. His art has been shown in international contemporary art exhibitions, including dOCUMENTA (13) and the Kochi-Muziris Biennale in 2012.

== See also ==
- List of Afghan Americans
