= Masuda Sultan =

American writer (born 1978)

Masuda Sultan (Kandahar 1978) is an Afghan American entrepreneur, memoirist, and international human rights advocate.

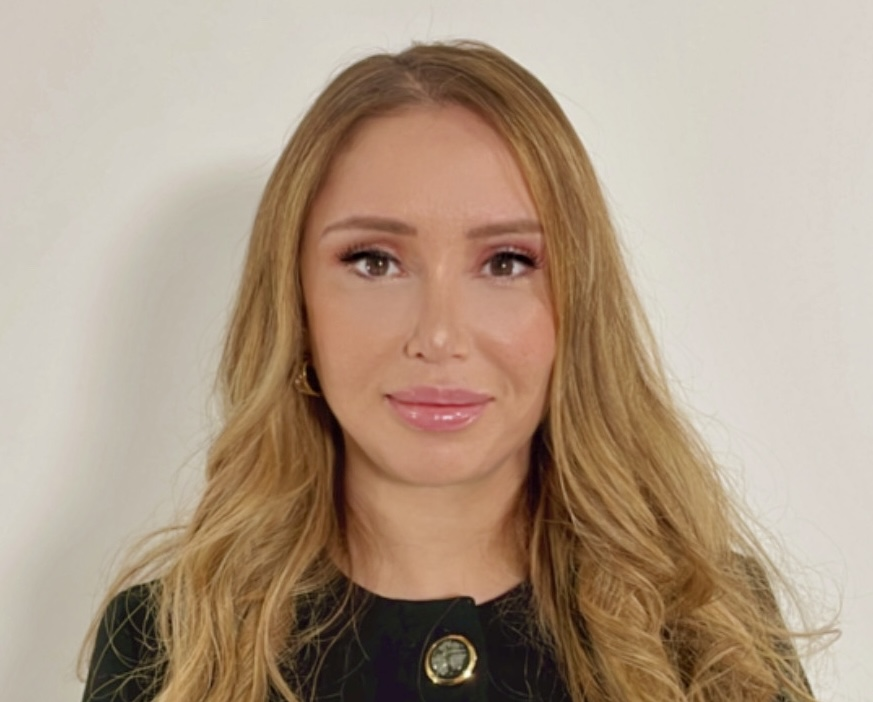
Masuda Sultan

== Biography ==
Sultan arrived in the United States at the age of five and was raised in Brooklyn and Flushing, Queens . She attended local public schools and attained her master's degree in public administration from the John F. Kennedy School of Government at Harvard University.

She is the author of My War at Home, a memoir reflecting on her life as an Afghan American, in which she speaks of conflicts arising from her need for independence in the scheme of Afghan traditional culture, for example, her arranged marriage with an Afghan man. She is one of the founders of Women for Afghan Women. Masuda returned to Afghanistan in December 2001 and learned that 19 members of her family were killed in an October 2001 US air raid 60 miles north of Kandahar. Masuda was featured in and contributed to the making of the documentary From Ground Zero to Ground Zero in which she travels to Afghanistan with documentary maker Jon Alpert. It is during this trip she learns of the killings in the October air raid. She also witnesses music playing on the streets of Kandahar and girls attending school, both of which were illegal just months prior.

Working with the families of 9/11 victims including Rita Lasar, the sister of Abe Zelmanowitz, Masuda lobbied the U.S government to appropriate aid for civilian victims of bombings in Afghanistan. In 2002, Senator Leahy championed the "Afghan Civilian Assistance Program", a USAID program to assist families and communities mistakenly bombed during US military operations in Afghanistan. The program set a historical precedent for civilian casualties inflicted due to errors in war.

In 2008, Masuda was invited to the White House to meet George W. Bush and Laura Bush and discuss her experiences as an entrepreneur in Afghanistan including bringing Etisalat, a large telecommunications provider from Abu Dhabi into the country.

== Publications ==
- Sultan, Masuda. My War at Home. Washington Square Press, 2006, ISBN 1-4165-2305-7
- Sultan, Masuda. "From Rhetoric to Reality: Afghan Women on the Agenda for Peace", 2005
