= Pashtun Americans =

Americans of Pashtun birth or descent

Total population
- 279,628 (2024)

Regions with significant populations
- New York City, San Francisco Bay Area, Virginia, Los Angeles Texas, Washington, New Jersey, Pennsylvania, Maryland,

Languages
- Pashto, American English, Urdu, Dari Persian

Religion
- Islam

Related ethnic groups
- Afghan diaspora, Pakistani diaspora

Pashtun Americans (Pashto: د امريکا پښتانه) are Americans who are of Pashtun origin, an Eastern Iranian ethnic group originating from a region of Afghanistan and Pakistan historically called Pashtunistan.

== Demographics ==
US states with significant Pashtun populations, based on the 2000 Census.

=== History ===
The initial arrival of Pashtun immigrants to United States occurred in small numbers during the early 20th century, primary from border regions of British India (present-day Pakistan and Afghanistan), driven by opportunities in trade, labor, and education. A documented group of approximately 200 Pashtuns (also Known as Pathans) immigrants in 1920, settling in urban centers such as New York and California ports, where they engaged in merchant activities connected to global silk and spice trade networks. There early migrants were often from tribal backgrounds and formed informal support network in coastal cities to navigate the challenge of limited community infrastructure. Pioneering Pashtun figures, such as traders linking Central Asia goods to America markets, exemplifies the small- scale, voluntary migration patterns before World War II, though specific profiles remain sparsely recorded due to the era's documentation biases. There 400,000 Afghans in the US; 50-60% are Pashtuns, and 690,000 Pakistanis in the US; 20% are Pashtuns. There are more than 270,000-560,000 Pashtuns in the United States. Pashtuns are part of Pakistani diaspora and Afghan diaspora. The 1950s to 1970s saw the largest numbers of Pashtuns immigrating to the United States.

== Military ==
A small number of Pashtun Americans have served in the United States Armed Forces, in varying roles in the War in Afghanistan. LtCol Asad Khan, a Pakistani-American marine, was a member of one of the first conventional units to enter Afghanistan. Khan would return to Afghanistan in command of the 1st Battalion 6th Marines in 2004; only to be later relieved of command. Pfc. Usman Khattak, an ethnic Pashtun from northwest Pakistan, is a US Army Food Specialist with the 539th Transportation Division and is based at the US Army camp in Kuwait.

== Media ==
The Voice of America has a Pashto language service.

== Organizations ==
The Pakhtoon American Community Association (PACA) is a cultural association based in Maryland, which organizes an annual Pashto Conference, in addition to other events. The Khyber Society, founded in 1986 in New York, also arranges cultural events.

== Notable Pashtuns ==
American Pashtuns

== See also ==
- Pakistani Americans
- Afghan Americans
- Pashtun diaspora
