= Kabuli Kid =

- Promotional poster
- Directed by: Barmak Akram
- Written by: Barmak Akram
- Produced by: Olivier Delbosc; David Mathieu-Mahias; Marc Missonnier; Mani Mortazavi
- Starring: Haji Gul Aser; Leena Alam; Valéry Schatz; Amélie Glenn
- Cinematography: Laurent Fleutot
- Edited by: Hervé de Luze; Elise Fievet; Pierre Haberer
- Music by: Barmak Akram
- Release dates: September 2008 (Venice); 29 April 2009 (France)
- Running time: 97 minutes
- Countries: France; Afghanistan
- Language: Persian

Kabuli Kid is a Persian-language 2008 French-Afghan drama film directed and written by Barmak Akram. It stars Haji Gul Aser, Leena Alam, Valéry Schatz and Amélie Glenn. The film, about a Kabul-based taxi driver who finds an infant left in his back seat, was screened at the 65th Venice International Film Festival at the 23rd International Film Critics' Week and won EIUC Human Rights Film Award. Also, in the Simorghs of the East section - International Cinema Competition of the 27th Fajr International Film Festival, Barmak Akram received Best debut for his film Kabuli Kid. The film is produced by Fidélité Films, 4 à 4 Productions, and Les Auteurs Associés.

== Cast ==
- Haji Gul Aser as Khaled
- Valéry Schatz as Mathieu
- Amélie Glenn as Marie
- Mohammad Chafi Sahel as Baba
- Leena Alam as Khaled's wife
- Messi Gul as the abandoned infant
- Saleha Khan Gul
- Rohina Gul
- Mariam Hakimi

== Reception ==
The film was critically acclaimed. Variety wrote: "Observation and narrative are so skillfully intertwined that every detail gestates a potential full-blown story and every story point teems with cultural contradictions. Thus, when Khaled’s wife Leena Alam slips among the veiled women waiting to claim the infant, she silently unleashes a subversively alternate point of view. Highly accomplished tech credits reinforce pic's authenticity."
