= Cortijada Los Gazquez creative retreat =

Creative retreat in Andalucia, Spain

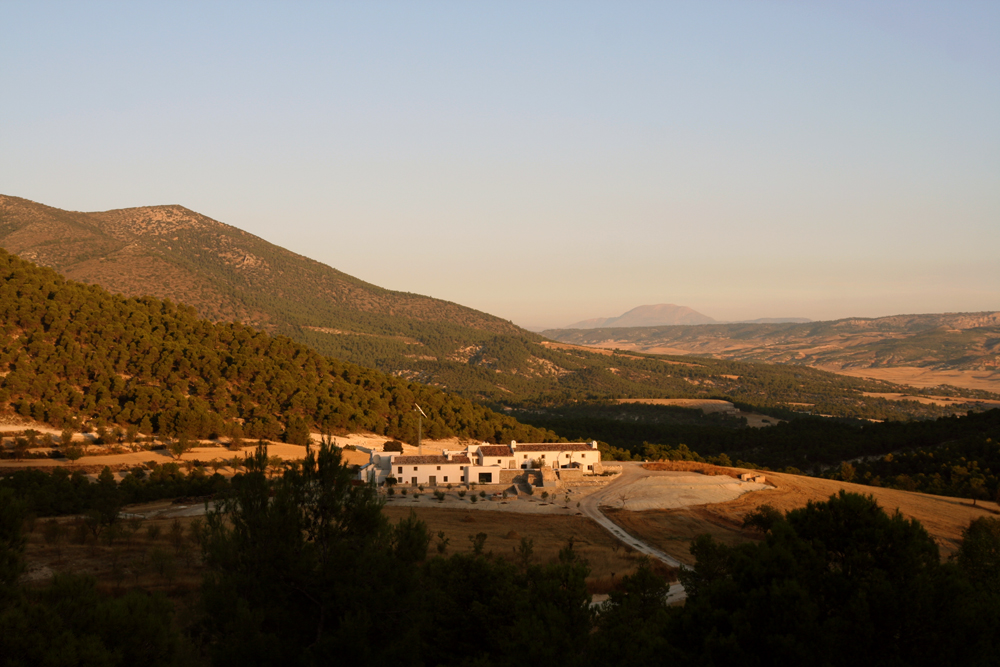
La Cortijada

Cortijada Los Gazquez is a creative retreat situated in an off-grid location within the Parque Natural Sierra Maria - Los Velez, in Andalucia, Southern Spain. The house is the result of renovating five traditional farmhouses (Cortijada, in Spanish) into one carbon-neutral building. Energy is harnessed through the use of solar power, wind power, and wood burning. Los Gazquez oversees 47 acres (190,000 m^{2}) of farmland, including an Olive Orchard, almond and fruit trees, and wheat fields. It is also the site of Joya, an artists’ residency program focused on art that engages with issues of ecological sustainability.

== History ==
Los Gazquez is the project of Simon and Donna Beckmann, who chose the location and began working on developing the property into an ecologically and socially responsible retreat in 2006. The five original farmhouses represented a traditional Spanish set-up, of simple vernacular structures that economically accommodated farmers as they cared for the surrounding land. The Beckmanns combined the houses to create a space that could meet the ecological goals of their project, while also maintaining the essential architectural style of the original houses.

La Cortijada’s design is rooted in an effort to respect the traditional Spanish architecture while also allowing for attention to design. Construction of the building includes traditional whitewashed stone and adobe. Inside, reformed Andalucian ceilings have been created, using pine and poplar beams covered in yeso. The exterior rooftop is a traditional techa arabe, or a composition of curved tiles.

In the renovation of the five old farmhouses, the style of the vernacular, understood as the “unconscious work of craftsmen based on knowledge” was preserved. By combining vernacular elements with a more modern pared down minimalism, the structure and design of La Cortijada Los Gazquez is an example of New Vernacular architecture, that which “considers the synthesis of modernity and tradition”.

== Energy and Sustainability ==
Los Gazquez is located Off-the-grid, or independent of the electric, water, and waste networks that connect most modern homes and buildings. The house itself is designed to focus on sustainable living, using both passive and active systems of off-grid energy systems. The passive systems incorporated into the house include a gray water reclamation system, rainwater harvest channels, wood fuel collected from the surrounding land, and a reedbed waste cleaning system.

The gray water system collects all the water from basins, showers, and the dishwasher and with the aid of eco-friendly detergents, transports the water through a series of channels to terraces for the irrigation of an orchard.

The rainwater harvesting system collects water from the roof during summer weather events or winter snow and transports it via acequias, or canals, to the aljibe, an underground deposit. During one summer rainfall weather event, the system can collect up to 50,000 litres of water.

The reedbed cleaning system consists of two alternating aerobic vertical flow reedbeds and one anaerobic horizontal flow bed. Bacteria is digested in the vertical flow reedbeds by Phragmites australis. In the horizontal bed, amoebas and other protozoans digest bacteria. At the end of the process, the water is 98% clean and can be used for irrigation.

Heating, of both water and the house, is also achieved ecologically, via 24 vacuum tube hot water solar collectors as well as bio-mass wood boilers for underfloor central heating and the kitchen range.

Los Gazquez is powered by a 48v system that employs both a 6 x 160 watt photo voltaic panel with a tracking system to follow the sun as well as a 3000 watt wind turbine at 12 meters high. The tandem active systems were chosen because of the specific weather conditions of the region. High winds and more than 3100 hours of sunlight/year allow the panel and turbine to power the entire building without any additional energy.

== Joya, a Residency for Artists Working Within Transition Culture ==
Cortijada Los Gazquez Creative Retreat is host to Joya, a residency for artists working within transition culture.

The term ‘transition culture’ is used to identify rising groups of individuals who are adopting strategies to meet the environmental and energy challenges that lay ahead. As the world rapidly approaches ‘peak oil,’ the point in time when the maximum rate of global petroleum extraction is reached, it also faces a terminal decline in production. As a consequence strategies to maintain human culture and modern technological society without a reliance on fossil fuel based energy sources are being sought by a number of related individuals and movements.

The term ‘Transition Design’ was coined by Louise Rooney at the Kinsale Energy Descent Action Plan as part of the transition town movement started in Ireland. Rob Hopkins has spread these ideas internationally via the internet, lectures, and his book ‘The Transition Handbook’ which sees the combination of peak oil and climate change as an opportunity to restructure society with local resilience and ecological stewardship.

In addition, permaculture, particularly as expressed in the writings of David Holmgren, also sees peak oil as holding enormous opportunities for positive change as long as countries respond with foresight. Rebuilding local food networks, energy production, and the general implementation of ‘energy descent culture’ are examples of responses to the acknowledgment of finite fossil fuel resources.

The term ‘transition culture’ is used to identify this rising group of individuals who are already adopting strategies to meet the challenges that lay ahead. Rob Hopkins describes ‘... a sense of quickening and exhilaration in talking and listening to each other, a vision of what we want and rolling up our sleeves and starting to create it’. The Joya residency is intended to provide a creative platform for artists to respond to changing ecological events. ‘Joya’s’ role is to bring awareness to, and acknowledgement of art's contribution to the interpretation and understanding of the ‘transition’ away from fossil fuel to a sustainable future.

The first artist in residency, Rebecca Fortnum of the University of Art, London, said of the location:

“As it is wind and solar powered, the whole Los Gazquez energises itself through the environment and this provides a metaphor for the creative endeavour of the studio.”

Future participants who have been accepted to the Joya residency include:

- Gordon Senior, Sculptor, California and Norfolk
- Kathryn Lynch, Painter, New York
- Clare Price, Painter, London
- Jessica Hargreaves, Painter, New York

La Cortijada also offers a Joya Residency program for writers.

== See also ==
- Off-the-grid
- Transition Towns
- Permaculture
- Vernacular Architecture
