= A Letter to the President =

2017 film

- Film poster
- Directed by: Roya Sadat
- Written by: Roya Sadat
- Produced by: Aziz Deldar; Roya Sadat
- Starring: Leena Alam
- Cinematography: Behrooz Badrooj
- Edited by: Ahmad Farid Farahmand; Razi Kashi
- Music by: Zabih Mahdi
- Release date: 7 August 2017 (Locarno)
- Country: Afghanistan
- Language: Dari

A Letter to the President is a 2017 Afghan drama film written and directed by Roya Sadat. It was selected as the Afghan entry for the Best Foreign Language Film at the 90th Academy Awards, but it was not nominated.

The film was the winner of One Future Prize at the Munich Film Festival in 2018.

== Plot ==
Soraya, a low-level government official, is imprisoned when she defends a woman from village lords. Behind bars, she writes to the Afghan President for help.

== Cast ==
- Leena Alam as Soraya
- Aziz Deldar as Behzad

== See also ==
- List of submissions to the 90th Academy Awards for Best Foreign Language Film
- List of Afghan submissions for the Academy Award for Best Foreign Language Film
