= Leila Christine Nadir =

- Education: BA, Syracuse University MA, Columbia University PhD, Columbia University
- Occupations: Artist and Writer
- Writing career
- Notable awards: New York Foundation for the Arts Fellowship, Franklin Furnace Fund for Performance Art, New York State Council on the Arts

Leila Christine Nadir is an artist and writer and Associate Professor at the University of Rochester, where she is also Founding Director of the Environmental Humanities Program.

== Early life and education ==
Nadir grew up in an Afghan-American family in rural Western New York State. She credits her parents' marriage for her "high tolerance for insanity" and lack of tolerance for all sentimental clichés, especially about bicultural experiences. She has a BA from Syracuse University and an MA and PhD in English & Comparative Literature from Columbia University. She has been an art-resident at Bemis Center for Contemporary Art and at Center for Land Use Interpretation. She is a former Mellon Foundation Post-Doctoral Fellow of Environmental Humanities at Wellesley College.

== Career ==
Nadir works as both a writer and artist, often with the artist Cary Adams. Her writing is published by scholarly journals, literary magazines and popular periodicals, including North American Review, Asian American Literary Review, American Scientist, Leonardo, Hyperallergic, and Rhizome. As co-founder of the Ecoarttech art-media collaborative with artist Cary Peppermint, Nadir has presented creative projects and workshops at the Whitney Museum of American Art, the New Museum, and the Neuberger Museum, and gives regular lectures worldwide. She currently teaches humanities courses in the Sustainability and Media Studies programs of the University of Rochester.

Nadir's memoir work, such as Bad Muslim (2018), revolves around her mixed-ethnicity upbringing and the colorful marriage of her Afghan, Muslim father and Slovak, Catholic mother, who together raised seven children. In "Life After Ruins," she writes that growing up in the Afghan-American diaspora has made the past a "constant preoccupation," inspiring her memoir writing.

Nadir's artworks focus on practices of healing amidst personal and ecological traumas. With artist Cary Peppermint, she creates art about food and environment that redresses a cultural-memory disorder that they call Industrial Amnesia. Their collaborations intertwine microbial, digital, and artistic cultures through fermentation-based workshops, reading groups, and dinners with the public. Their video work, Probiotics of the Kitchen (2015) restages Martha Rosler’s Semiotics of the Kitchen (1975) forty years later.

She is a founding member of the NYC-based Afghan American Artists and Writers Association.
