= Aziz Herawi =

Afghan musician

Aziz Herawi (1952 – January 29, 2011, in Herat, Afghanistan) was a noted musician from Afghanistan. He specializes in the dutar and rubab, both plucked string instruments. Afghan musician Aziz Herawi was seven years of age the first time he heard the strings of the dutar being plucked. He talked one of the family servants, who hid it in a blanket, into buying the instrument for him from a shepherd. The boy would wait until his father was asleep, then sneak into the woods surrounding their home. Alone, in the dark, he practiced, teaching himself to play the long-necked 12-stringed dutar.

Herawi lived in northern California since 1985 and released several albums. His music is a blend of Persian and Hindustani instruments and styles and considered to be typical of Herat, Herawi's hometown, near the northeastern border with Iran.

Herawi died January 29, 2011, in Herat, Afghanistan, while he visited family.
