= Leena Alam =

Afghan actress (born 01/11/1980)

Leenā Alam
- لینا علم
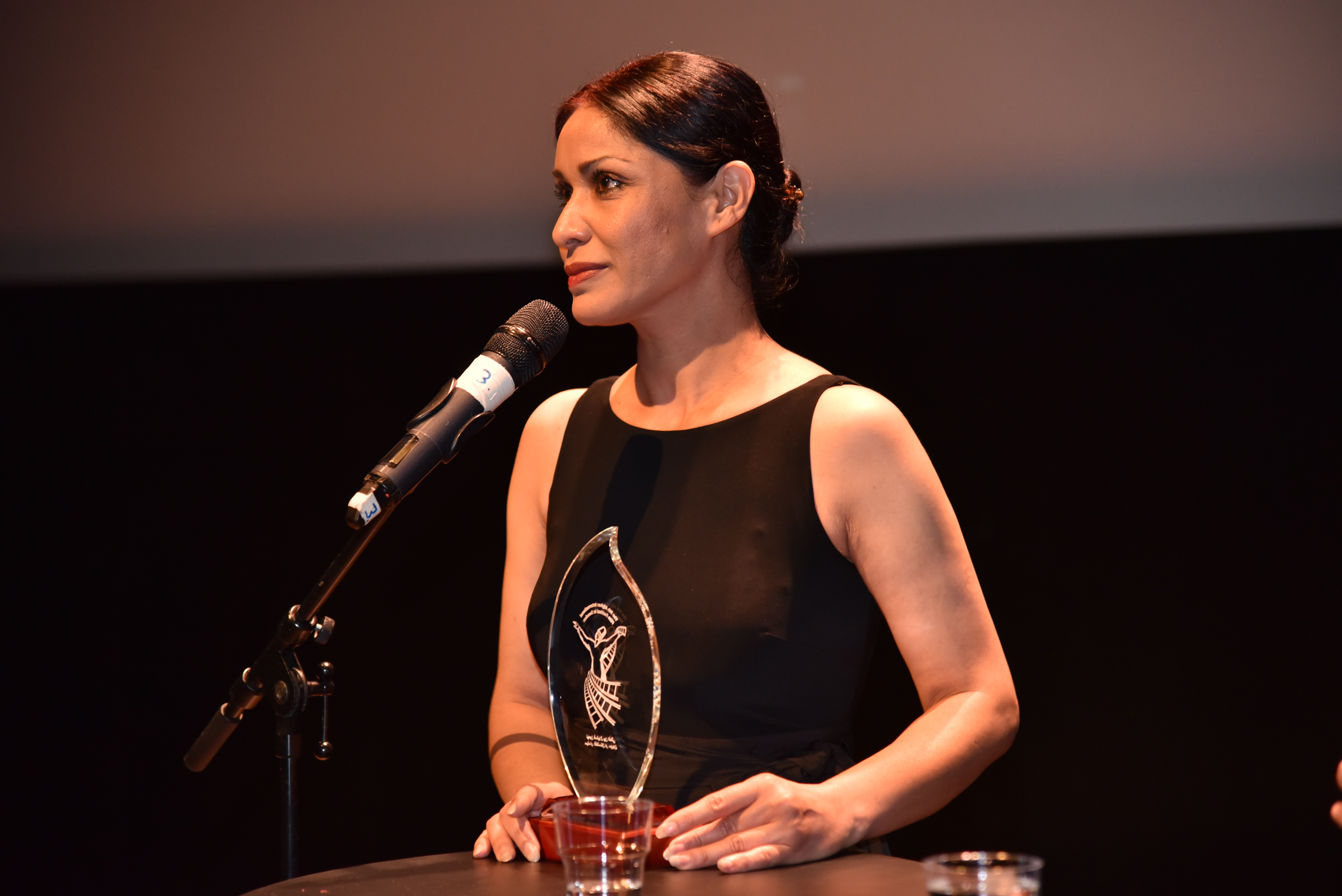
- Leena Alam at the Sama International Film Festival in Sweden (2016)
- Born: Leenā Alam; 1978 (age 47–48); Kabul, Afghanistan
- Occupations: actress, human rights activist
- Years active: 1998 – present

Leenā Alam (Persian: لينا علم;) is an Afghan film, television, and theater actress. She has appeared in films such as Kabuli Kid, Black Kite, Loori, A Letter to the President and Hassan. She is widely known to have worked on film and TV that speak of child marriage, gender inequality, women's rights and social conflicts.

She has also been known as "Shereen of Afghanistan" (شیرین افغانستان) after playing in the taboo-smashing feminist television drama, Shereen (شیرین), the first of its kind to have been made in Afghanistan, directed by Ghafar Azad and produced by Kaboora and Tolo TV. Shereen was nominated for Best Mini-Series Drama alongside The Night Manager, Mr. Robot and Deutschland 83 and Leena Alam was nominated for Best Actress at the Seoul International Drama Awards 2016.

In 1991, Alam and her family moved to the United States of America because of the civil war in her homeland. She began her acting and cinema career in 1998.

In 2021 she was named as one of the BBC's 100 Women.

== Film and modeling career ==
Alam was born in 1980 in Kabul, Afghanistan. At the start of her career, Alam modeled and took part in dance competitions. In 1994 she participated in Mr and Miss San Francisco India Pageant organized by Rennu Dhillon, where she captivated the audience with one and half-minute dance performance and was awarded the Best Talent winner. Her first movie was Promise of Love, produced by Tarin Films. But it was In Foreign Land directed by Hafiz Asefi which was released first in 1998.

In the film, In Foreign Land she played an Indian girl who had come to the United States to study but was devoted to her traditions and values. It was during the casting for this movie that Alam met Salaam Sangi, who would become her mentor. In Loori, by Saeed Orokzai, she played a traumatized Afghan girl with a brain injury who had forgotten her past. Alam has called this film—written specifically for her by Hamid Naweed, a poet, writer, and painter — one of her favorites.

In 2007, Alam returned to Kabul and appeared with Hadji Gul in Kabuli Kid, a French-Afghan drama produced by Fidélité Films directed by Barmak Akram. In 2013, she was in Soil and Coral, an Iranian-Afghan film, produced by Parween Hussaini and directed by Masoud Atyabi. Also in 2013, she played one of the lead roles in the second season of the popular TV serial Our Street, directed by Mirwais Rekab. In 2014, she was in Darya's Message produced by Axobarax Films (directed by Homayoun Karimpour) and Black Kite by Tarique Qayumi. The film was made quickly in Afghanistan, changing location frequently to avoid the Taliban recognising that a filming was in progress. The same year Alam appeared in Shereen, a taboo-smashing feminist TV drama about the struggle of a powerful woman directed by Ghafar Azad produced at Kaboora/Tolo. In 2016 she played a title role in the film A Letter to the President for which she won the Best Actress award at Sinema Zetu International Film Festival (SZIFF) hosted by Azam TV and also was nominated for Best Actress award at the Malaysia International Film Festival (Golden Global Awards) Malaysia 2018 .

Leena Alam has appeared in documentary features such as True Warriors directed and produced by Ronja von Wurmb-Seibel and Niklas Schenckand and Playing with Fire, a film written and directed by Anneta Papathanasiou. True Warriors tells the story of a brave group of artists from Kabul whose premiere of a play on suicide attacks was attacked by a 17-year-old suicide bomber on December 11, 2014, at French Culture House in Kabul, Afghanistan. And the 2014 documentary, Playing with Fire, talks about actresses in Afghanistan who are courageous enough to be involved with theater arts and find themselves facing harsh criticism, social disapproval and even threats about their lives and the lives of their families.

She also did few short films to help young filmmakers in Afghanistan, starring in Siyar Noorzad's Moving in a Circle and Lal Alizada's Live in Grave, The Unknown by Ghafar Faizyar, Qamar by Nima Latifi and In Parentheses directed by Ghafar Azad.

Alam has been a member of the jury at the Negah-e-No Film Festival in 2014 and 2015. Member of the jury at the Afghanistan Human Right Film Festival 2015, the Sama International Film Festival in Stockholm, Sweden 2016, the 8th National Theater Festival Afghanistan 2014, an International Feature Fiction Jury member at the Adelaide Film Festival, Australia in 2017 and at Imagine India International Film Festival 2020, 2021, and 2022 Madrid, Spain.

She has appeared in music videos for Shafiq Mureed, Arash Barez, and Kerry Coulshed.

On the historic stage of The Monastery Ruin (Stiftsruine) in the 68th Bad Hersfelder Festspiele 2018, Hessen, Germany, She played Solveig in Peer Gynt by the Norwegian dramatist Henrik Ibsen, directed by Robert Schuster the German theater director and professor at the Ernst Busch Academy of Dramatic Arts in Berlin.

In 2021, Leena Alam collaborated with theater artists in the US performing monologues written by playwright Angeline Larmaer. The project “The Voices of Afghanistan” was conceptualized and produced by Che’Rae Adams at the LA Writers Center and performed live for HowlRound TV. Monologues were based on true interviews of individuals still trapped inside Afghanistan during the fall of Kabul.

== Human rights activism ==
Alam was named peace ambassador of the UNAMA United Nations Assistance Mission in Afghanistan UNAMA in 2009.

Forty days after Farkhunda, a 27-year-old Afghan woman falsely accused of burning a copy of the Quran, was publicly beaten and burnt to death on 19 March 2015, Alam joined activists in Kabul to stage a re-enactment of the killing. She played the role of Farkhunda. The New York Times reported:

On the morning of the re-enactment, Ms. Alam woke up with butterflies in her stomach. Though she is an experienced film actor, she said it was proving a tough role. For one thing, Ms. Alam had been among the mourners at Farkhunda's burial, and it was the first real dead body she had ever seen, she said.

She and her fellow actors agreed then that there would be no crying during their performance, but in rehearsals, they all kept bursting into tears. "The workers, my director, everyone, we were just mental," she said. One person would cry, then she did. "I kept saying, 'Don't make me weak, I don't want to cry".

During the re-enactment, some of her fellow actors got a little too into character, she said, and though their rocks and clubs were made of sponge or foam, her face began to sting from all the blows, and she came away a bit bruised. Spectators often gasped because it seemed so real, and even some of the policemen were seen to be weeping.

== Awards ==
- Best Actress – Kabul International Film Festival, Afghanistan 2008
- Best Actress – Tolo Film Festival, Afghanistan 2009
- Best Actress – Afghanistan Human Rights Film Festival, Afghanistan 2013
- Best Actress – Negah-e-No Film Festival, Afghanistan 2014
- Honorary Award – Herat International Women's Film Festival, Afghanistan 2014
- Best Actress – Negah-e-No Film Festival, Afghanistan 2015
- Best Actress – Mehrgan International Film Festival, Afghanistan 2015
- Best Actress – Herat-International Women's Film Festival, Afghanistan 2015
- Best Actress – Nomination, Seoul International Drama Awards, South Korea 2016
- Honorary Award – Contribution to Afghan Cinema - The Sama International Film Festival in Stockholm, Sweden 2017
- Best Actress – Nomination, Malaysia International Film Festival (Golden Global Awards) Malaysia 2018
- Best Actress – Sinema Zetu International Film Festival (SZIFF) Tanzania 2019
- Best Actress – Lajward National Film Festival جشنواره ملی فلم لاجورد Afghanistan 2020
- In 2021 she was named as one on the BBC's 100 Women.
