= Hamid Naweed =

Afghan-American writer and art historian

Hamid Naweed (Persian: حامد نوید) is an Afghan-American writer and art historian.

Naweed received his MFA from State University of New York at Buffalo after which he thought Art History and Aesthetics at Kabul University. As a Fulbright scholarship, he authored a number of articles on Afghan art. He is on the advisory board of The Alliance for the Restoration of Cultural Heritage as well as a correspondent for C-SPAN and contributor for NPR.

Naweed is the author of two books, one on Rumi and another on Afghan art history for which he was recognized by the Afghan Embassy in Washington DC.

His screenplay for Loori won the Best Screenplay Award at New York Film Festival. Currently he hosts a regular TV show exploring art on Zarin TV.
