= Cary Peppermint =

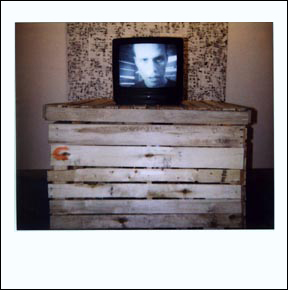
- Born: 1970 (age 55–56); Rome, Georgia
- Education: MFA Syracuse University, BFA University of Georgia
- Known for: Performance, Internet Art, New Media Art, Environmental Art
- Awards: 2012 New York State Council on the Arts Grant, 2009 New York Foundation for the Arts Digital / Electronic Arts Fellowship, 2009 Whitney Museum of American Art Sunrise/Sunset Commission, 2008 New Radio and Performing Arts Turbulece.org commission, 2003 Rhizome Commission, 2001 Franklin Furnace Performance Grant

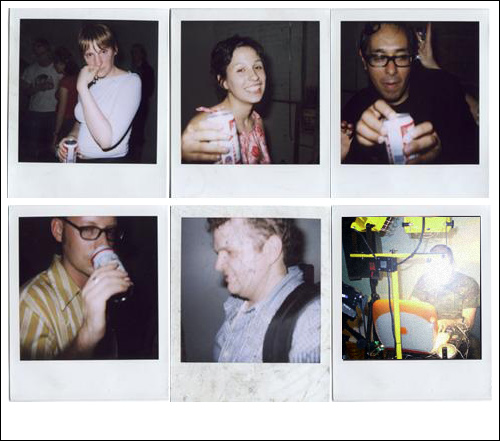
'Conductor Number Nine' Networked Performance Cary Peppermint Postmasters Gallery, NYC 1999

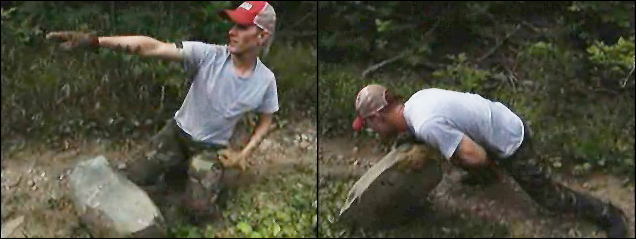
'Practical Performances in the Wilderness' Networked Performance Cary Peppermint http://vimeo.com/32684540 2005

Cary Peppermint (born 1970) is a New York-based conceptual, new media, performance, and environmental artist. Peppermint was born in Rome, Georgia, in 1970 and received in M.F.A. from Syracuse University in 1997. Peppermint has conducted a series of Dadaist and Fluxus inspired digital, networked performances via his website RestlessCulture, an ongoing, post-cinema living documentary database. In Artforum, Mark Tribe called this series of work “twenty-first-century takes on Warhol's Factory.”

In 2005, Peppermint founded ecoarttech with his partner Leila Christine Nadir. Their collaborative explores environmental issues and convergent media and technologies from an interdisciplinary perspective. In a 2012 interview with visualMAG, Peppermint and Nadir report that "movement between environmental extremes–between mega-cities and green landscapes–has always been the most creatively stimulating 'place' for us to dwell in. No matter where we go, we are always fascinated by the technologies and systems that human beings use to produce their survival and to create meaning in their lives."

One of ecoarttech's inaugural works was “Wilderness Trouble” (2007). More recent works include “Indeterminate Hikes” (2011), a smartphone app and installation that transforms chance encounters in everyday locales into public performances of bio-cultural diversity and wild happenings, created originally for the Whitney Museum of American Art's 2010 ISP exhibition; “Untitled Landscape #5” (2009), an internet-based work commissioned by the Whitney Museum of American Art for its Sunrise and Sunset series; “Center for Wildness in the Everyday” (2010), a series of networked performances about the “wildness” of water in the Texas Trinity River Basin, commissioned by the University of North Texas College of Visual Arts and Design; and “Eclipse” (2009), a net art work exploring the politics of pollution, the myth of wilderness, and the surplus of online information, commissioned by Turbulence.org of New Radio and Performing Arts, Inc.

He is currently an assistant professor of Art and Art History at the University of Rochester. His work is in the collections of the Walker Art Center, Rhizome.org at the New Museum, The Whitney Museum of American Art, and Computer Fine Arts.
