= Haris Tarin =

Afghan-American Muslim leader (born 1978)

Haris Tarin (born 1978) is an Afghan-American Muslim leader.

Tarin is the son of a former diplomat who fled war-torn Afghanistan with his family when Tarin was four years old. He grew up in Los Angeles and earned a B.A. from California State University, Northridge.

Haris was previously the director of the Washington D.C. office of the Muslim Public Affairs Council (MPAC). Currently, he serves as a senior policy advisor for the Office for Civil Rights and Civil Liberties at the United States Department of Homeland Security.
