= Shamim Jawad =

Afghan activist

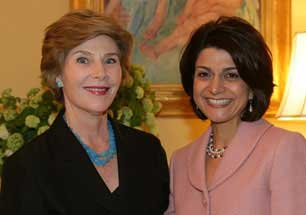
Jawad (right) in 2005

Shamim Jawad is the founder and president of the Ayenda Foundation, the Afghan Children Initiative, which works for the welfare, education, health, shelter and safety of Afghan children. She is a member of the U.S.-Afghan Women’s Council, an organization established in 2002 by Presidents Karzai and Bush to advance the rights of women in Afghanistan. She serves on the board of trustees of the American University of Afghanistan (AUAF), a private, not-for-profit institution of higher education in Afghanistan, offering internationally supported degree programs and education. In addition, Mrs. Jawad is a member of the International Women's Forum (IWF).

In 2009, Shamim Jawad was one of 25 women selected worldwide from executives in many different industries for the International Women’s Forum Leadership Foundation Fellows Program at Harvard University and the Judge Business School at the University of Cambridge. She has also received the Liberty Award from Dialogue on Diversity for her efforts to defend women's rights and advocate social welfare for women in Afghanistan.

Jawad was born in Kabul, Afghanistan and studied at Kabul University and Golden Gate University in San Francisco, where she received a bachelor's degree in Human Relations. Before her husband's diplomatic posting to Washington, DC in November 2003, she worked as a financial consultant for TIAA-CREF, a financial services organization.
