= Ariana Afghanistan =

Ariana Afghanistan TV
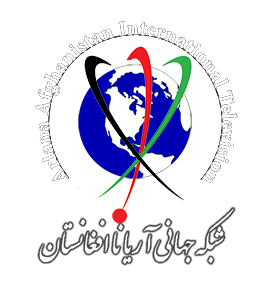
- Country: United States
- Broadcast area: Worldwide
- Headquarters: Irvine, California, United States

Programming
- Language(s): Persian, Pashto, English

Ownership
- Owner: Nabil Miskinyar

History
- Launched: 1 July 2006; 18 years ago

Links
- Website: www.arianaafgtv.com

Ariana Afghanistan International TV (Dari/Pashto: آریانا افغانستان تلویزیون) is a satellite television channel based in Irvine, California, United States, with branches in Hamburg and Kabul. It is founded and owned by Nabil Miskinyar. It currently broadcasts on the satellite Galaxy 19 97°W to North America, and TürkmenÄlem 52°E / MonacoSAT for Europe, Western and Central Asia.

The station originated in 1989. On 1 July 2006 it initiated 24 hour broadcasting worldwide on satellite. From its launch till 2009, it was based in Orange, California. Programming broadcasts in Persian and Pashto, as well as English. News is provided by Voice of America.

== Stance ==
Ariana Afghanistan's official stance is said to be "dedicated to promote democracy and respect for human rights" in Afghanistan.

The channel was regarded to be a frequent critic of former Afghan President Hamid Karzai. The channel is also overwhelmingly anti-Communist. It has American influences but also has many Islamic programs. Conservatives and liberals both have their own programs on the channel.

== See also ==
- Afghan Americans
