= Təbrizli =

Village in Lerik Rayon, Azerbaijan

Təbrizli is a village and municipality in the Lerik Rayon of Azerbaijan. It has a population of 155.
