= Nabil Miskinyar =

Afghan TV host (born 1948)

Nabil Miskinyar نبیل مسکین‌یار
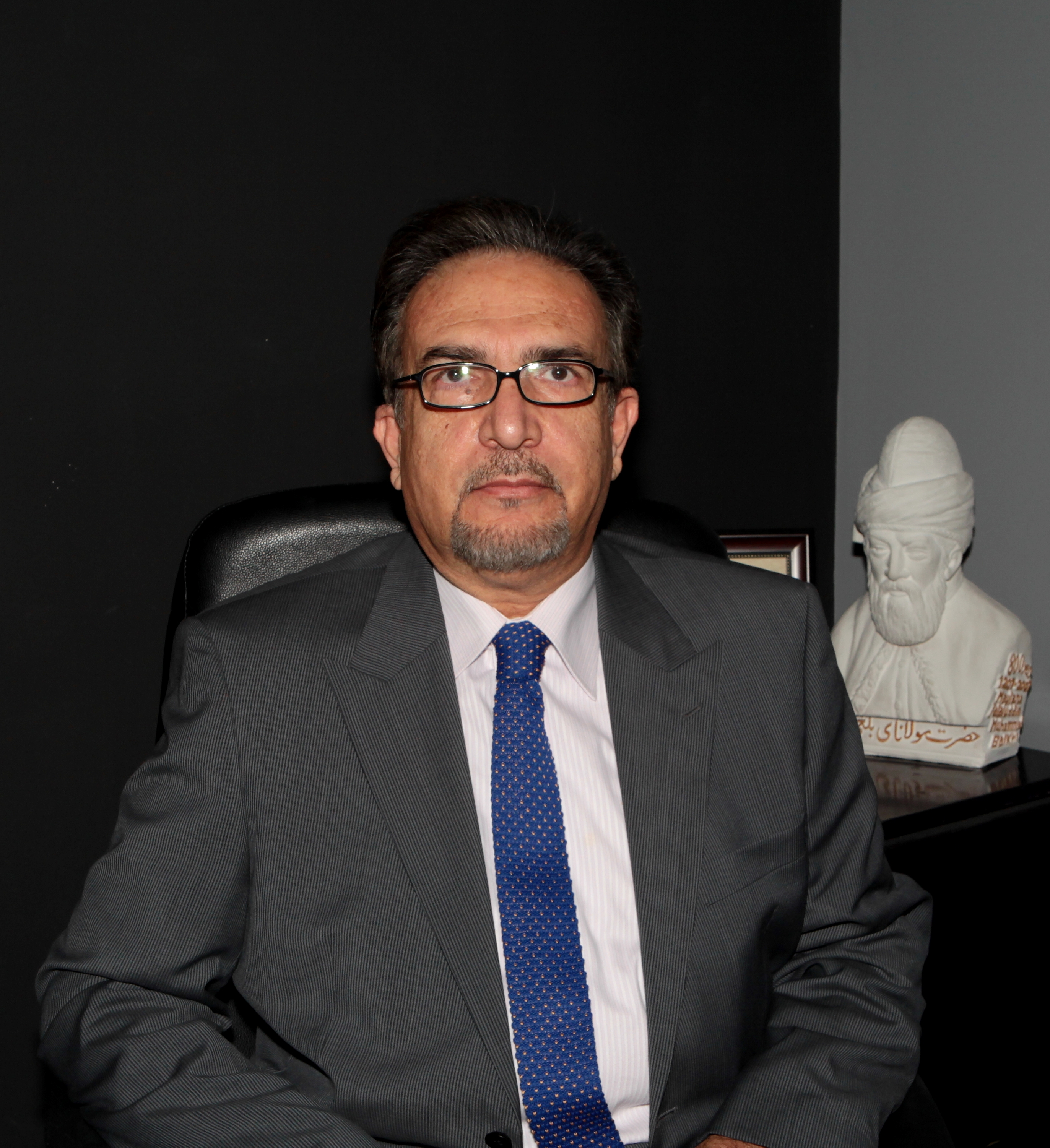
- Born: 1948 (age 77–78); Kabul, Afghanistan
- Occupation: Journalist

Nabil Miskinyar (Persian: نبيل مسكين‌يار, born 26 September 1948) is an Afghan TV host who owns a TV channel in the United States called Ariana Afghanistan TV since 1989. His office is based out of Orange, California and has offices in San Francisco, Dubai and Hamburg.

On September 11, 2011, Miskinyar was attending a business meeting when he was abducted and held at gunpoint for approximately seven hours. He posted a media statement later in the week detailing how he was "interviewed" in a propaganda video and forced to denounce his work and political beliefs. His abductors have yet to be brought to justice.
