= Hafizullah Emadi =

Hafizullah Emadi is an Afghan author, independent scholar and works as a development consultant for international non-governmental organizations. Most recently, he lives in California and works in Kabul, Afghanistan.

== Biography ==
He was born in the Shibar District, Bamyan Province of Afghanistan.

After receiving his Doctor of Philosophy from the University of Hawaiʻi at Mānoa in 1988, Emadi taught in the University of Hawaii system, joined the East-West Center's International Relations Program as a Fellow in 1990, and was awarded a fellowship at the Woodrow Wilson Center in 1999.

He monitored the Afghanistan elections in 2004.

== Publications ==
Emadi has written books and articles on Islamic and Middle Eastern politics and culture, including:

- Hafizullah Emadi (2026). The Dragon’s Reach: China’s Rise as an Imperial Power in the Middle East (Switzerland, Palgrave Mcmillan). ISBN 978-3-032-06037-2; Ebook ISBN 978-3-032-06038-9; doi.org/10.1007/978-3-032-06038-9.
- Hafizullah Emadi (2024). Politics of Despotic Leaders: Subversion, Repression and Development in the Hazara Ismaili Community of Afghanistan. Peter Lang. ISBN 978-1-80374-651-7 (Print); 978-1-80374-649-4 (ePDF); 978-1-80374-650-0 (ePUB).
- Emadi, Hafizullah (2005). Culture and Customs of Afghanistan. Greenwood Publishing Group. ISBN 9780313330896.
- Emadi, Hafizullah (2002). Repression, Resistance, and Women in Afghanistan. Greenwood Publishing Group. ISBN 9780275976712.
- Emadi, Hafizullah (2001). Politics of the Dispossessed: Superpowers and Developments in the Middle East. Greenwood Publishing Group. ISBN 9780275973650.
- Emadi, Hafizullah (1990). State, Revolution, and Superpowers in Afghanistan. Praeger. ISBN 9780275934606.
- Hafizullah Emadi. (2010). Dynamics of Political Development in Afghanistan: The British, Russian, and American Invasions. Palgrave MacMillan. ISBN 978-1349288335.
- Hafizullah Emadi (1993). Politics of Development and Women in Afghanistan. Paragon House Publishers.ISBN 1-55778-582-1
- Hafizullah Emadi (1997). China's Foreign Policy toward the Middle East. Royal Book Company.
- Hafizullah Emadi (1991). Afghanistan's Gordian Knot: An Analysis of National Conflict and Strategies for Peace. East-West Center.
