= Nake M. Kamrany =

Nake M. Kamrany Ph.D., J.D. (August 29, 1934, Kabul, Afghanistan) is a professor at the University of Southern California and Afghan-American economist.

Kamrany has over 20 publications on the political economy of Afghanistan. He has been a Consultant to the United Nations and the U.S. Government.
