= Fariba Nawa =

Afghan-American freelance journalist (born 1973)

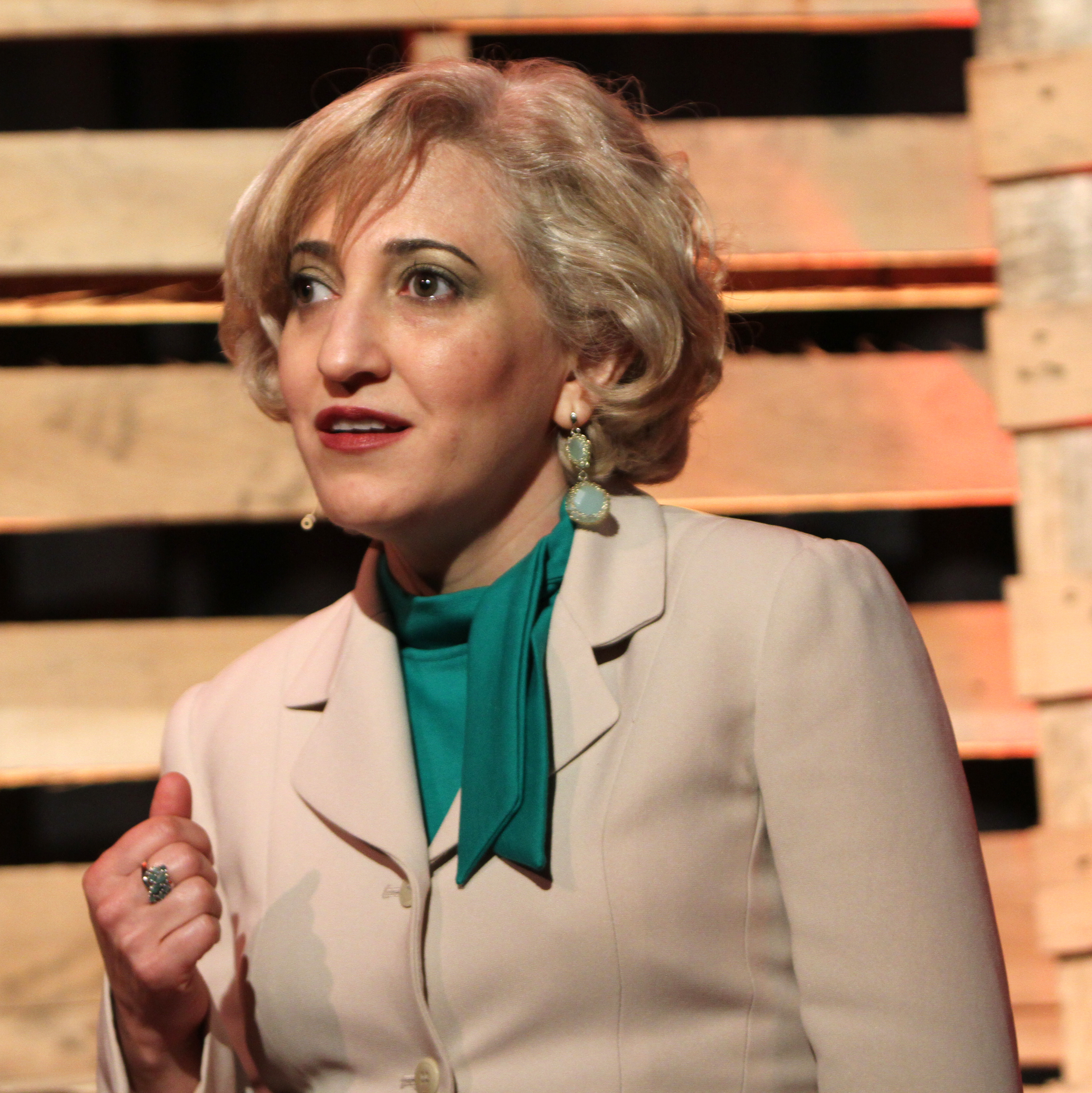
- In TEDxMonterey 2013
- Born: Fariba Nawa; 1973 (age 52–53); Herat, Afghanistan
- Occupation: freelance journalist

Fariba Nawa (born 1973) is an Afghan-American freelance journalist.

== Biography ==
She grew up in Herat and Lashkargah in Afghanistan as well as Fremont, California. She was born in Herat to a native Afghan family. Her family fled the country during the Soviet invasion in the 1980s. She is trilingual in Persian, Arabic, and English. She has done her master's degree in Middle Eastern Studies and Journalism from New York University. In 2000 she ventured into Taliban-controlled Afghanistan by sneaking into the country through Iran. She lived in and reported from Afghanistan from 2000 to 2007. Furthermore, She travelled extensively in Afghanistan, Iran, Pakistan, Egypt, and Germany, reporting on her experiences.

Her report "Afghanistan Inc." (in Corp Watch) is one of the main resources used in different media around the globe while debating effectiveness of reconstruction efforts in Afghanistan. She examines the progress of reconstruction, uncovers some examples of where the money has, and has not, gone, how the system of international aid works, and does not, and what it is really like in the villages and cities where outsiders are rebuilding the war-torn countryside. She's been a freelance writer for 15 years, covering war, corruption, human/rights, women's cultural trends, and parenting for a range of prestigious newspapers and radio stations.

Her book Opium Nation was published in November 2011. The book is her personal account of the drug trade in Afghanistan and how it has affected the poor and disadvantaged.

Her writing has appeared in a variety of media, including The Atlantic, Newsweek, Sunday Times of London, Foreign Affairs, Daily Beast, Newsday, Mother Jones, The Village Voice, The Christian Science Monitor, San Francisco Chronicle, and others. She also contributes to radio stations such as National Public Radio (NPR).

== Awards ==
- PEN USA finalist in research nonfiction for Opium Nation Sep. 2012
- Achievement in community service from Afghan Coalition Mar. 2013
- Project Censored for investigative report Afghanistan, Inc. Oct. 2007
- One World Broadcasting Trust Press Award for “Brides of the drug lords” Jun. 2005
- Overseas Press Club Scholarship for an essay on the drug trade in Afghanistan Jan. 2004
