= And the Mountains Echoed =

2013 novel by Khaled Hosseini

- First edition (US)
- Author: Khaled Hosseini
- Language: English
- Genre: Historical fiction; Drama
- Publisher: Riverhead Books (US); Bloomsbury (UK); Viking Canada (CAN) Sathish Venkatesan (IND)
- Publication date: May 21, 2013
- Publication place: United States
- Media type: Print (hardback & paperback)
- Pages: 402 pp (first edition, hardcover)
- ISBN: 9781594631764
- OCLC: 829999614

And the Mountains Echoed is the third novel by Afghan-American author Khaled Hosseini. Published in 2013 by Riverhead Books, it deviates from Hosseini's style in his first two works through his choice to avoid focusing on any one character. Rather, the book is written similarly to a collection of short stories, with each of the nine chapters being told from the perspective of a different character. The book's foundation is built on the relationship between ten-year-old Abdullah and his three-year-old sister Pari and their father's decision to sell her to a childless couple in Kabul, an event that ties the various narratives together.

Hosseini stated his intentions to make the characters more complex and morally ambiguous. Continuing the familial theme established in his previous novels, The Kite Runner and A Thousand Splendid Suns, And the Mountains Echoed centers on the rapport between siblings. Besides Abdullah and Pari, Hosseini introduced two other sibling and sibling-like relationships—the children's stepmother Parwana and her disabled sister Masooma and an Afghan-American doctor named Idris and his cousin Timur.

As it was Hosseini's first novel to be published in six years, And the Mountains Echoed was reportedly in high demand. It received favorable pre-publication reviews and was anticipated as another strong success, reaching the top 10 on Amazon.com before its release and later becoming a bestseller. Five months after the publication of And the Mountains Echoed, it was reported that three million copies had been sold.

== Composition and publication ==
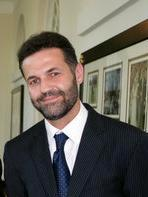
Khaled Hosseini, 2007

Khaled Hosseini was born in Afghanistan but left the country in 1976 at the age of 11, eventually moving to the United States where he worked as a doctor. He wrote his first novel, The Kite Runner, in 2003 and became a full-time writer a year and a half later. He published his second book, A Thousand Splendid Suns, in 2007. Both novels were successful, and by the time of his third publication they had together sold over 38 million copies across 70 countries.

Hosseini first began to consider the plot of And the Mountains Echoed during a 2007 trip to Afghanistan with the UN Refugee Agency. While there, he heard stories from several village elders about the deaths of young, impoverished children during the winters, which gave the foundation for the fundamental event of the novel: a parent's choice to sell a child to prevent this from occurring. "The novel began very, very small, and it began with a single image in my head that I simply could not shed," he relayed. "It was the image of a man walking across the desert and he's pulling a little Radio Flyer red wagon, and in it there's a little girl about 3 years old, and there's a boy walking behind him, and these three people are walking across the desert." Hosseini originally planned for it to be written in a linear fashion similar to his previous novels, but, during the writing process, it was expanded to cover a series of interconnected stories surrounding a large number of characters not directly related to each other. Comparing the process to a tree, he stated that the story "just branched out" and "got bigger and bigger as it went along".

"Slowly, a family began to take shape in my mind-not unlike the many I had visited-one living in a remote village, forced to make a painful choice that most of us would find unbearable. At the heart of this family, I pictured a young brother and sister, who become the unwitting victims of their family's despair. The novel begins, then, with this single act of desperation, of sacrifice, an act that ruptures the family and ultimately becomes the tree trunk from which the novel's many branches spread out."

— Khaled Hosseini

As is his pattern, Hosseini drew on his early experiences in Afghanistan to create the foundation of the book. He states that his travels to Afghanistan later in life also influenced his writing, albeit involuntarily. For example, during a 2009 visit, he met two young sisters in a remote village outside Kabul. The older one, who he estimated to be around six years old, acted as a mother figure to the younger girl. Hosseini stated that their bond formed the foundation of the relationship between Abdullah and Pari in the novel.

And the Mountains Echoed became the first to not deal directly with the Taliban, which featured prominently in both of his previous works. Though Hosseini did not consciously decide to avoid that topic, he stated that he was glad that he had moved away from it in order to keep the storyline fresh. The characters' struggles were largely personal and unrelated to the political turmoil in Afghanistan. Hosseini added, "I hope a day will come when we write about Afghanistan, where we can speak about Afghanistan in a context outside of the wars and the struggles of the last 30 years. In some way I think this book is an attempt to do that."

The title was derived from a line from "The Nurse's Song" by English poet William Blake: "And all the hills echoed". In January 2013, Publishers Weekly announced the publication date as May 21 of that year, and Riverhead Books released a statement that the novel was about "how we love, how we take care of one another, and how the choices we make resonate through generations". First printed in hardback, And the Mountains Echoed was priced at $28.95 in the United States and £14.99 in the United Kingdom. Hosseini went on a five-week tour to 41 cities across America to promote the book. In October 2013, plans were confirmed to translate And the Mountains Echoed into 40 languages, among them Icelandic and Malay.

== Plot ==
The novel opens in the year 1952. Saboor, an impoverished farmer from the fictional village of Shadbagh, decides to sell his three-year-old daughter Pari to a wealthy, childless couple in Kabul. Abdullah adores Pari, and helps collect various feathers for her which she loves. Once, he sold a pair of his shoes for a peacock feather because he knew Pari would treasure it. Ignorant of his father's plans, 10 year old Abdullah, who has raised Pari since their mother died giving birth to her, insists on following when his father departs from the village to Kabul with Pari. After slapping and ordering him to return to the village several times, Saboor finally relents and allows Abdullah to come along on the condition that no tears be shed. While camping out for the night, Saboor tells the children a story about another poor farmer who was forced to give up a beloved child, but the significance of the tale doesn't register with Abdullah. It is only after they arrive at the home of the adoptive parents in Kabul and he visits a bazaar to buy things for Pari that Abdullah realizes what is happening. He pleads and wails against Saboor's rule that he could not cry in Kabul as Ms. Wahdati tries to assure him that the arrangement is for the best and he will understand when he is older. Abdullah keeps Pari's box of feathers safe.

Subsequent chapters expound on how the arrangement came to be: the children's stepmother, Parwana, grew up as the less-favored child to her beautiful twin sister Masooma. One day, in a flash of jealousy because Masooma and Saboor were to be wed, she pushed Masooma out of a tree resulting in paraplegia. Parwana subsequently spent several years caring for her sister until the latter asked her to help her commit suicide and to then marry Saboor. At Masooma's request Parwana takes Masooma out to the middle of nowhere and leaves her there. Their older brother, Nabi, left to work for Mr. Wahdati, a wealthy man in Kabul, and became infatuated with his wife, Nila. After Nila expressed dismay about her inability to have children, Nabi arranged for Pari to be sold to the couple, because Parwana has given birth to a son and Saboor cannot support 3 children. After Pari is sold in Kabul, Nabi is no longer welcome in the village.

In the ensuing years, Abdullah leaves Afghanistan. Mr. Wahdati suffers a stroke, prompting Nila, who had a French mother and spoke fluent French, to take Pari and move to Paris, France. Nabi, while assuming the role of Wahdati's primary caregiver, finds a number of sketchbooks in Wahdati's closet filled with pictures of him drawn before the stroke. Unnerved by the discovery that Mr. Wahdati loves him, he resolves to leave but decides against it after he is unable to find someone suitable to take over for him. Nabi subsequently spends the next 50 years working for Mr. Wahdati. He develops a deep bond with his employer, and Nabi comes to the realization that his purpose is to take care of Mr. Wahdati. Later Mr. Wahdati's health deteriorates further, and Nabi helps him commit assisted suicide by kissing him on the lips and pressing a pillow over his face.

Wahdati's neighbors, meanwhile, move to the United States with their children after the Soviet invasion. Cousins Idris and Timur return to Afghanistan over two decades later in 2003 to reclaim their family's property. While there, Timur makes a great show of publicly distributing money to street beggars while Idris privately bonds with Roshi, an Afghan girl who suffers from a horrific injury and whose family was murdered by her uncle. Idris at first promises to arrange for Roshi to undergo the operations needed for her recovery but distances himself from her and Afghanistan on returning to the States. Several years later, Idris comes across Roshi signing copies of her bestselling memoir, which she has dedicated to her adoptive mother and Timur, who paid for her surgery.

Nila, now living in Paris, is unhappy for much of her life, taking up a number of lovers and beginning to refer to the plain and practical Pari as her "punishment". She commits suicide in 1974 after giving a detailed interview about her early life. Pari suspects that she is not Nila's biological daughter and plans a trip to Afghanistan to explore her heritage. However, she postpones it indefinitely after marrying and becoming pregnant. After having three children and being widowed at the age of 48, she receives a posthumous letter from Nabi in 2010, at the age of 63, detailing the circumstances of her adoption by the Wahdatis.

Later chapters focus on Adel, a boy learning that his father is a war criminal and that his house is built on land that previously belonged to Saboor, and Markos, a Greek aid worker in Afghanistan and acquaintance of Nabi. In this chapter, Iqbal, Saboor's and Parwana's son, is an older man and he tries to obtain the documents proving he is the owner of the land, but Adel's father pays off a judge to say they were burned in a fire. Outraged and upset, Iqbal marches to Adel's home and throws a rock through the window. Adel's father "deals" with Iqbal, and Adel is convinced his father has him killed.

In the final chapter, narrated by Abdullah's daughter, also named Pari, Abdullah and Pari are reunited in California after more than 50 years apart. However, he is suffering from Alzheimer's disease and is unable to remember her echoing the conclusion of the story their father told them so many years ago as children on their last night together in Afghanistan. Abdullah's daughter finds the box of feathers and gifts it to Pari, although she does not remember the significance of the feathers, she is touched that Abdullah has kept her in mind all these years.

== Characters ==
"Is the quintessential Afghan woman Nila, the dramatic Kabul socialite turned Parisian poetess? Or is she the guilt wracked Parwana, who feels condemned to a life of grief for a single moment of jealousy? Or is she the war-maimed [Roshi], whose story is written into an archetypal tale of woe for mass consumption by American readers, where the guilt of the Afghan character melts indelibly with the guilt of the Western reader, accomplishing with grace the revelation of the complicated relationship between the two?"

— Rafia Zakaria, a director of Amnesty International USA

Khaled Hosseini chose to tell the story in a "fragmented and fluid" form; each of the nine chapters is told from a different character's perspective, and each narrative provides an interconnection with the others'. Los Angeles Times critic Wendy Smith compared this style to the classic One Thousand and One Nights.

- Abdullah is an Afghan growing up in the fictional village of Shadbagh. After his father Saboor's choice to sell his younger sister to a wealthy couple, Mr. and Mrs. Whadati in Kabul, he resolves to leave Afghanistan, travelling to Pakistan and eventually the United States. He opens an Afghan restaurant there and has a daughter, whom he names after his sister. Following his wife's death, Abdullah is diagnosed with Alzheimer's and is later unable to remember his sister after being reunited with her.
- Pari is Abdullah's younger sister who, at the age of three, is sold by her father Saboor to the wealthy Wahdati couple in Kabul. She and Abdullah are portrayed as having an unusually close relationship during her early years, though she forgets him along with the rest of her biological family following her adoption. She spends her adolescence and adulthood in France following her adoptive father's stroke and eventually becomes aware of her history through a posthumous letter from her uncle Nabi, who had arranged for her to be sold as a child. When she is finally reunited with Abdullah, he is unable to remember her due to his Alzheimer's. "I could see that if the reunion were to occur, it would occur on these terms and it wouldn't be the reunion we'd expect and perhaps the one we want," Hosseini explained.
- Nila Wahdati is a young French-Afghan woman renowned for her sexually charged poetry who is married off to a wealthy Kabul businessman. According to Hosseini, many aspects of her character were derived from women he encountered during parties his parents hosted in Kabul in the 1970s, many of whom he recalls as "beautiful, very outspoken, temperamental...drinking freely, smoking". At some point prior to the beginning of the story, she was apparently sterilized while undergoing treatment for an illness, leading her to buy Pari as an adopted daughter. Described as unusually beautiful and discontent, she later relocates to Paris following her husband's stroke and eventually commits suicide. Hosseini explained that he was unconcerned with making Nila likable—"I just wanted her to be real – full of anger and ambition and insight and frailty and narcissism."
- Parwana is the stepmother of Abdullah and Pari. She grew up in Shadbagh with her brother, Nabi, and twin sister, Masooma. Parwana is ill-favored for most of her life as opposed to the strikingly beautiful Masooma. This eventually results in what Rafia Zakaria describes as a "poignant tale of a plain twin whose single act of vengeance, of pushing her pretty sister off a swing results in a lifelong moral burden". Masooma's accident leaves her paralyzed, leaving Parwana tortured by guilt and forced to care for her from then on. After several years, Masooma persuades Parwana to leave her in the desert to die and marry Saboor, Abdullah and Pari's father.
- Nabi is the older brother of Parwana and Masooma. Despite being "a character who slips beneath the notice of many of the novel's noisier characters", he organizes the event that serves as the primary plot of the story: the adoption of Pari. After being hired as a chauffeur for the Wahdatis, he becomes infatuated with the childless Nila and arranges for Pari to be sold to her in hopes that she will become his lover. After Nila's husband suffers a stroke and Nila leaves for Paris, he realizes that he had been foolish to think so and becomes the primary caregiver for his bedridden employer. He later develops a deep bond with Mr. Wahdati, and they become platonic lifelong partners.
- Amra Ademovic is a Bosnian nurse working in a hospital in Afghanistan after the fall of the Taliban. She cares for and later adopts Roshi, a critically wounded Afghan orphan. Amra, according to Hosseini, was created to represent the foreign aid workers serving in Afghanistan. While visiting the country in 2003, he had encountered a number of people who had left comfortable lifestyles to help provide relief aid, and he had wanted to pay tribute to them through the portrayal of Amra. Hosseini described the character as one of his favorites and said, "She has seen humanity at its worst, having worked in war zones most of her career, and yet she has retained great capacity for compassion and mercy. She is also very street smart, fiercely intelligent, and brutally honest."
- Idris is an Afghan-American doctor who left Afghanistan during the Soviet invasion. He later returns to Afghanistan, along with his narcissistic and childish cousin Timur, in 2003 to reclaim their family's land. While there, Idris meets Roshi and befriends her, moved by her tragic story. Hosseini stated that Idris' experience as an Afghan expatriate was partly based on his own. "He was a vehicle to describe what it's like to be an Afghan in exile, to return to see how divergent my experience was from other Afghans," Hosseini said. Idris begins to set up plans to pay for her surgery in America, but upon returning home, he loses that drive. It is later revealed Timur pays for Roshi's surgery.
- Markos Varvaris is a plastic surgeon from the Greek island of Tinos. His childhood best friend, Thalia, suffered from severe facial disfigurement after being attacked by a dog and undergoing a botched surgery. This motivated Markos to become a surgeon and work in various developing countries, including Afghanistan.
- Adel is the son of a wealthy war criminal who has turned Shadbagh into "Shadbagh-e-Nau" or "New Shadbagh". Adel is raised in an isolated mansion with the belief that his father is a hero, witnessing him donate money and fund the building of schools. When he discovers the truth (from Gholam the grandson of Saboor and Parwana) he is deeply upset but aware of "[t]he part of him that over time would gradually, almost imperceptibly, accept this new identity that at present prickled like a wet wool sweater."

== Themes ==
Whereas The Kite Runner focused on the dynamic between fathers and sons, and Splendid Suns on that between mothers and daughters, this novel tells its story through the prism of sibling relationships – a theme refracted through the lives of several pairs of brothers and sisters.

— Michiko Kakutani of The New York Times.

Khaled Hosseini considers pain, love, and familial love to be the primary themes of And the Mountains Echoed. The separation of the two siblings, Abdullah and Pari, is "the heart of the book". Both subsequently become "victims of the passage of time": Abdullah, who is older and remembers Pari, agonizes over her loss for most of his life, while Pari is younger and able to forget her brother after losing him. However, towards the end of the book, Pari is informed that she was adopted and that she has a brother, Abdullah; she locates him in the United States only to discover that he is suffering from Alzheimer's disease and has forgotten her. Hosseini stated, "The question is raised a number of times about whether memory is a blessing – something that safeguards in all the things that are dear to you – or is memory a curse – something that makes you relive the most painful parts of your life, the toil, the struggle, the sorrows." Thus, the combination of these events make And the Mountains Echoed "kind of like a fairytale turned on its head".

I think at the core, all three of my books have been love stories – and they haven't been traditional love stories in the sense that a romantic love story between a man and a woman, you know, they've been stories of love between characters where you would not expect love to be found. So it is always these intense relationships that form under unexpected circumstances.

Rafia Zakaria, a director for Amnesty International USA, wrote that the themes of guilt and gratitude also feature prominently. She used the backstory of Parwana, Abdullah and Pari's stepmother, and her sister Masooma as an example: "We find a poignant tale of a plain twin whose single act of vengeance, of pushing her pretty sister off a swing results in a lifelong moral burden. The sister, who was to be married to a man both sisters love, becomes an invalid for life, and both serve the sentence, the healthy one tending to the other and wrecked within by the knowledge that she was the cause of their collective misfortune." She stated the theme of dependence also extended to the story of Nabi, the brother of Parwana who arranges the selling of Pari and who is later left as the sole caretaker of his paralyzed employer.

== Translations ==
Iran does not recognize various international copyright accords. As a result, by 2017, sixteen different unofficial Persian translations of And the Mountains Echoed were in circulation in Iran. Rema Menon translated this into Malayalam under the title Parvathangalum Matolikollukunnu, and she also won the Kerala Sahitya Akademi Award for Translation in 2017 for the same.

== Critical reviews ==
"It's hard to do justice to a novel this rich in a short review. There are a dozen things I still want to say – about the rhyming pairs of characters, the echoing situations, the varied takes on honesty, loneliness, beauty and poverty, the transformation of emotions into physical ailments. Instead, I'll just add this: Send Hosseini up the bestseller list again."

— Marcela Valdes of The Washington Post

Three million copies of And the Mountains Echoed were sold within five months of its publication. Los Angeles Times critic Wendy Smith found it "painfully sad but also radiant with love".

Fran Hawthorne of The National described the book as "masterful storytelling" and a "haunting portrayal of war-ravaged Afghanistan and insight into the life of Afghan expatriates". Susan Balee from Philly.com wrote that it "[captures] at the personal level the history of his war-torn homeland: Fierce loyalties alternate with bloody betrayals". The Guardian's Philip Hensher gave a more mediocre review and said, "I enjoyed this novel in a very undemanding sort of way. The shifts of viewpoint would be ambitious if the novel had any interest in varieties of psychology. But it serves its purpose in providing amusement for two and a half hours; a day after finishing it, I had forgotten everything about it."

Reviewers agreed that Hosseini has succeeded in making his characters complex. Alexander Linklater from The Guardian wrote, "From the moment the realisation dawns that Saboor is going to give Pari to the wife of a wealthy man in Kabul, Hosseini saturates the various layers and characters of his novel with a yearning for the moment that brother and sister will reunite." Soniah Kamal of Atlanta Arts was particularly favorable towards Amra, the Bosnian aid worker who cares for and adopts Roshi, as she "stuns with her hope in humanity no matter what callousness she has witnessed". USA Today critic Kevin Nance found the story of Abdullah and Pari "devastating" but thought the large cast of characters, "including some introduced fairly late in the proceedings, when the reader just wants to return to the core cast", was excessive.

The structure of the book drew mixed reactions, with Toronto Star's Kim Hughs describing it as "the novel's most defining feature and its most exasperating conceit". She believed that Pari was meant to be the protagonist of the story but that the shifting focus on the numerous other personalities left her "barely [squeaking] through the clutter". The Independent's Arifa Akbar stated: "The changing points of view and leaps in time can confuse and confine, leaving characters clearly defined but lacking depth. Decades gallop by and it is as if the story of these interconnected, cross-generational lives will simply go on echoing the original crime of Abdullah and Pari's separation." Michiko Kakutani from The New York Times thought the novella-like storytelling was handled well and wrote, "Khaled Hosseini's new novel, And the Mountains Echoed, may have the most awkward title in his body of work, but it's his most assured and emotionally gripping story yet, more fluent and ambitious than The Kite Runner (2003), more narratively complex than A Thousand Splendid Suns (2007)." Kamal agreed, saying that the structure was "exquisitely crafted". Scoop Empire's Sherine El Banhawy added that the focus on multiple characters allowed to readers to gain a better understanding of the diversities of Afghan culture.

== Awards ==
- 2013: Goodreads Choice Awards, category Best Fiction

== See also ==
- A Fort of Nine Towers
