= Rema Menon =

Indian translator

- Born: September 10, 1944 (age 81); Kingdom of Cochin (present-day Thrissur district, Kerala)
- Occupation: Translator
- Spouse: Narayana Menon
- Children: 1
- Parents: Puthezhath Raman Menon (father); Moothedath Janakiyamma (mother)
- Writing career
- Notable awards: Kerala Sahitya Akademi Award for Translation (2017)

Rema Menon is an Indian Malayalam language writer and translator from Kerala. Her translation of The Alchemist into Malayalam was the first translation of that book into any of the Indian languages. For the translation of Khaled Hosseini's And the Mountains Echoed, she won the Kerala Sahitya Akademi Award for Translation in 2017.

== Biography ==
Rema Menon was born in present-day Thrissur district of Kerala on September 10, 1944. Rema is the daughter of noted writer and former Kerala Sahitya Akademi president Puthezhath Raman Menon and Moothedathu Janaki Amma. Hails from Thrissur district of Kerala, she studied in a Malayalam medium school in Thrissur. Her father had a large collection of books. This led her to reading literary works at a very young age and then to writing. At first she wrote short stories.

Rema married textile engineer Narayana Menon and moved to Ahmedabad, Gujarat. She joined the school there as a teacher.

When her husband retired, she quit her job and settled in her hometown Thrissur.

== Literary career ==
Menon became more active in writing when she was residing in Gujarat with her family. The short stories she wrote were published in publications like Grihalakshmi, Vanitha, and Kumkumam. In 1984, she won the first prize in a short story writing competition organized by Kumkumam. This gave her more confidence to write. Later the stories she wrote published as two collections of short stories, Smarakam and Paithrikam.

Menon entered literary translation at the age of fifty-six by translating The Alchemist into Malayalam. She first heard about this book when her son Madhu, who had read The Alchemist, told her about it. Menon liked the plot and asked her son to bring her an English version of it. When she finished reading The Alchemist, which she received in this way, Rema felt that this was a book that would inspire any reader, and for a timepass, she took every line of it and wrote it down in Malayalam. Upon knowing this, her daughter-in-law Sabine sent an e-mail message to the author of the novel Paulo Coelho about it, and then Paulo Coelho called her on the phone and spoke to her.

It was at that time that Rema Menon went to Thrissur to attend a program of the Kerala Sahitya Akademi. There, when she met Ravi DC, the editor of DC Books, she told him about the translation she had done. Interested in the plot, Ravi agreed to publish the book and subsequently purchased the copyright of 'The Alchemist' and published Malayalam translation of the book in 2000. It was the first translation of that book into any Indian language. 48 editions of The Malayalam Alchemist have been released so far.

When her son got a job transfer and was living in London, Coelho invited him to a book launch event in London, and gave him his novels The Fifth Mountain and Miss Prim and the Devil, saying that they were his gift to his mother Menon. She read and loved these two novels and translated them into Malayalam as Fifth Mountain and Chekuthanum penkitavum. They were also published by DC Books. As the number of Coelho fans in Kerala increased, DC commissioned her to translate two more books. That is how Accrayil Ninnum Kandedutha Likhithangal (translation of the Manuscript found in Accra) and Alep (translation of Alep) were published. When she felt that the later works of Coelho were not as interesting as the books she had first read, she did not undertake any of Coelho's books for translation, even though she was asked to do so. Instead, Rema started translating other books.

Rema Menon has published Malayalam translations of over 60 notable English literary works. Notable books among them include translations of Afghan-American writer Khaled Hosseini's The Kite Runner (as Pattam Parathunnavar), A Thousand Splendid Suns (as Thilakkamarnna Ayiram Sooryanmar) and And the Mountains Echoed (as Parvathangalum Matolikollukunnu), translations of works such as Flight and Runners by Polish writer Olga Tokarczuk, who won the Nobel Prize in 2018, Mao's Last Dancer by Chinese writer Li Cunxin, the Tibetan work Polo Mountain (Alay), Siddhartha by Hermann Hesse, A Passage to India by E. M. Foster, Svetlana Alexievich's War's Unwomanly Face, Marieke Lucas Rijneveld's The Discomfort of Evening, Gandhiji's The Story of My Experiments with Truth, and spiritual works by many people such as the Dalai Lama, Swami Rama, Jaggi Vasudev, etc.

She is currently translating the South Korean novel A River in Darkness.

== Awards and honors ==
Rema Menon won the Kerala Sahitya Akademi Award for Translation in 2017 for her book Parvathangalum Matolikollukunnu, the translation of Afghan-American novelist Khaled Hosseini's And the Mountains Echoed.
