= Kerala Sahitya Akademi Award for Translation =

Literary award

- Native name: കേരള സാഹിത്യ അക്കാദമി അവാർഡ് (വിവർത്തനം)
- Sponsored by: Government of Kerala
- Country: India
- Presented by: Kerala Sahitya Akademi
- Rewards: Cash prize (₹25,000), Certificate, and Plaque
- Website: www.keralasahityaakademi.org

The Kerala Sahitya Akademi Award for Translation is given every year by the Kerala Sahitya Akademi (Kerala Literary Academy) for literary merit in translating a foreign-language work into Malayalam. It is one of the twelve categories of the Kerala Sahitya Akademi Award.

== Awardees ==
Year	Translation	Original book	Translator	Image
1992	Bhoothavishtar	Demons by Fyodor Dostoyevsky	N. K. Damodaran	
1993	Mahaprasthanathinte Margathiloode	Mahaprasthaner Pathe by Prabodh Kumar Sanyal	K. Ravi Varma	
1994	French Kavithakal	Multiple works	Mangalattu Raghavan	
1995	Thavalamillathavar	Khanabadosh by Ajit Kaur	V. D. Krishnan Nambiar	
1996	Shila Pathmam	Shilapadma by Pratibha Ray	P. Madhavan Pillai	
1997	Oru Pulimarathinte Katha	Oru Puliya Marathin Kathai by Sundara Ramasami	Attoor Ravi Varma	
1998	Vasanthathinte Murivu	The Wound of Spring by Menon Marath	M. Gangadharan	
1999	Raja Ravi Varma	Raja Ravi Varma by Ranjit Desai	K. T. Ravi Varma	
2000	Manasa Vasudha	Manabjamin by Shirshendu Mukhopadhyay	Leela Sarkar	
2001	Dharmapadam	Dharmapada	Madhavan Ayyappath	
2002	Sastram Charitrathil	Science in History by John Desmond Bernal	M. C. Nambudiripad	
2003	Ambedkar Sampoorna Krithikal	Ambedkar Complete Works by B. R. Ambedkar	M. P. Sadasivan	
2004	Divine Comedy	Divine Comedy by Dante	Kilimanoor Ramakanthan	
2005	Divyam	Divya by U. R. Ananthamurthy	C. Raghavan	
2006	Arkkamarashi	Akkarmashi by Sharankumar Limbale	Kaliyath Damodaran	
2007	Don Quixote	Don Quixote by Miguel de Cervantes	Thomas Nadakkal	
2008	Charakapaitrukam	Charaka Samhita by Charaka	Muthulakshmi	
2009	Padinjaran Kavithakal	Multiple works	K. Satchidanandan	
2010	Adinte Virunnu	The Feast of the Goat by Mario Vargas Llosa	Asha Latha	
2011	Ka:	Ka by Roberto Calasso	K. B. Prasannakumar	
2012	Marubhoomi	Désert by J. M. G. Le Clézio	S. Sreenivasan	
2013	Ulysses	Ulysses by James Joyce	N. Moosakutty	
2014	Chokher Bali	Chokher Bali by Rabindranath Tagore	Sunil Naliyath	
2015	Soundarya Lahari	Soundarya Lahari by Adi Shankara	Guru Muni Narayana Prasad	
2016	Pranayavum Mooladhanavum	Love and Capital: Karl and Jenny Marx and the Birth of a Revolution by Mary Gabriel	C. M. Rajan	
2017	Parvathangalum Mattolikollunnu	And the Mountains Echoed by Khaled Hosseini	Rema Menon	
2018	Swapnangalude Vyakhyanam	The Interpretation of Dreams by Sigmund Freud	P. P. K. Pothuval	
2019	Gautama Buddhante Parinirvanam	Book Three of Old Path White Clouds by Thích Nhất Hạnh	K. Aravindakshan	
2020	Upekshikkappetta Divasangal	Days of Abandonment by Elena Ferrante	Sangeetha Sreenivasan	
2021	Kayen	Cain by José Saramago	Aymanam John	
2022			V. Ravikumar	
2023			M. M. Sreedharan	
2024	Ente Rajyam, Ente Shareeram	El país bajo mi piel by Gioconda Belli	Chinju Prakash	
