= A Fort of Nine Towers =

2013 book by Qais Akbar Omar

- Cover art of the book
- Author: Qais Akbar Omar
- Cover artist: Mohammad Kheirkhah Zoyari
- Language: English
- Published: 2013, Picador Publications
- Publication place: United States
- Media type: Print (hardcover), Print (paperback)
- Pages: 389 (paperback)
- ISBN: 9781447229827

A Fort of Nine Towers is a memoir by Qais Akbar Omar recounting his childhood in Afghanistan, and the rise of the Taliban and the subsequent present war in Afghanistan. It was published in 2013 by Farrar, Straus and Giroux, New York. Qais, the author of A Fort of Nine Towers, reveals that his work is actually inspired by the works of Khaled Hosseini. The book has received positive reviews from critics. As the author's young life coincided with the war era in Afghanistan, there have been vivid descriptions of the conditions prevalent in that time.

== Storyline ==
Qais Akbar Omar begins with his account of life before the rise of the Taliban and the Mujaheedin in Afghanistan. He says he had always loved his grandfather, who was an educated scholar and loved to read Afghanistan in the Course of History by Mir Ghulam. One night, the entire town of Kabul suffered power outage. The author and his family could hear cries of "Allah-u-Akbar" from far away reverberate in the ears as if he had already heard it before. In a confused state of manner, Abdul, Qais's father, jumped out of the home and joined the people. It was soon clear: they were all revolting against the Soviet intervention in Afghanistan. Little did they know what they were up to; they in fact asked for the Mujaheedin to arrive and drive out the Russians. The author describes, "I had expected to see heroes in uniforms and shiny boots. But they were dressed like villagers in black turbans, the traditional baggy pants called shalwar and the long, tunic-like shirts called kamiz. The next day, they could hear the rockets firing, roaring above their homes. The roads were stained with the people's blood. Windows and glasses had broken because of the tremendous amount of noise by firing. The Mujaheedin were not the so called "holy warriors" as the people had thought them to be. They were criminals, and instead of helping the people, they looted them. After a few days, fighting between the various factions took place. There were snipers equipped with guns in the Kob-e-Aliabad mountains that shot anyone who ventured out alone. Finding it too difficult to stay in their old house, they decide to move to their father's good friend, Haji Noor Sher's home. It was the Qala-e-Noborja across the Sniper mountains, a relatively calmer and peaceful place to live in. They decide to leave Qais's cousin, Wakeel and grandfather behind in the other part of the city. The courtyard was quite luxurious.

== Characters ==
- Grandfather: His name was not disclosed by the author. He is said to be the best companion of Qais and much of the author's early life was spent sitting with him. He was a solitary man of nature; he loved to keep quite and listen. He was an avid reader and read books of all types. His favorite book was Afghanistan: In the Path of History by Mir Ghulam.
- Abdul: Qais's father. He ran grandfather's carpet business along with his partner Haji Noor Sher. He plays an important role in Qais's life—he was the one to take all of them (mother, Qais and sister) during the war in his old jeep and move about from one place to another, just to save their lives.
- Wakeel: Qais's cousin brother and best friend of youth; Wakeel was an ace kite flier. He was known by the local boys as the "cruel cutter". Wakeel is known in the book for his intelligence, witty thoughts and a good sense of humor. Wakeel eventually dies in the aftermath of war events; which is revealed during the later stages of the book.
- Qais: The main protagonist of the book, Qais, is the one who narrates the story. He owned a carpet business in Kabul during the late stages of war. He later sold the looms to women workers who were interested weaving and making some money to earn their livelihood.
- Mother: Qais's mother is emotionally weak at heart, and is sympathetic towards Qais. She has her extended family in Mazar-e-Sharif and in the Kunduz province of Afghanistan. She takes care of all her children and had contributed significantly in making Qais think about his future.
- Kuchi nomads: Qais's entire family went with the Kuchi nomads of Afghanistan. It was a bitter-sweet experience, as the author says, because they were habituated to be living amidst the luxuries of the city.
- Teacher: Qais's carpet teacher was a person born dumb. She was strikingly beautiful and the author had fallen in love with her. Even though she could not speak like others did, she spoke using sign language and gestures that Qais somehow managed to understand. She lived in the house adjacent to home of mother's aunt.

== Critical reception ==
A Fort of Nine Towers received mostly positive reviews. Critics all over the world have praised the author's sense "to weave the story". Stephenie Foster from The Huffington Post described it as:

Whether you've read other books about Afghanistan, or not, A Fort of Nine Towers is worth your time. It documents a riveting and chaotic time, and gives you a sense of what it was like to be there.

Rachel Newcomb, for The Washington Post posted,

The daily struggles of Omar's family to survive endless war, hunger and poverty demonstrate the remarkable ability of human beings to love and support one another despite the dire conditions in which they live.
