= Attoor Ravi Varma =

Indian poet and translator (1930–2019)

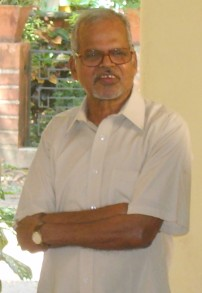
- Born: 27 December 1930; Attoor, Trichur, Kingdom of Cochin
- Died: 26 July 2019 (aged 88); Trichur, Kerala, India
- Education: Zamorin's Guruvayurappan College, Calicut; University College, Trivandrum; Malabar Christian College, Calicut
- Writing career
- Genres: Poetry, translation
- Notable awards: 1996 Kerala Sahitya Akademi Award for Poetry; 1997 Asan Smaraka Kavitha Puraskaram; 1997 Kerala Sahitya Akademi Award for Translation; 2001 Kendra Sahitya Akademi Award; 2005 P. Kunhiraman Nair Award; 2012 Ezhuthachan Puraskaram; 2015 Vani Samnvay Distinguished Translator Award; 2017 Kerala Sahitya Akademi Fellowship; Kendra Sahitya Akademi Translation Prize; Premji Award; E. K. Divakaran Potti Award; Mahakavi Pandalam Kerala Varma Kavitha Award

Attoor Ravi Varma (27 December 1930 – 26 July 2019) was an Indian poet and translator of Malayalam literature. One of the pioneers of modern Malayalam poetry, Ravi Varma is a recipient of Kendra Sahitya Akademi Award, Kerala Sahitya Akademi Award for Poetry and Kerala Sahitya Akademi Award for Translation, besides many other honours. The Government of Kerala honoured him with their highest literary award, the Ezhuthachan Puraskaram, in 2012 and the Kerala Sahitya Akademi inducted him as their distinguished fellow in 2017.

== Biography ==
Attoor Ravi Varma was born on 27 December 1930 in Attoor, a small village in Trichur district of the erstwhile Kingdom of Cochin (now part of the south Indian state of Kerala) to Krishnan Namboothiri and Ammini Amma. He joined Zamorin's Guruvayurappan College, Calicut for his pre-university course but was expelled from college due to his involvement in left-wing politics. Later, he continued studies at Malabar Christian College before graduating in Malayalam with honours from the University College, Trivandrum. Subsequently, he joined Presidency College, Madras Malayalam department as a faculty where he had the opportunity to be in touch with M. Govindan, the noted writer, which helped him in the studies of Tamil language. He started his career as a teacher in Madras but returned to Kerala to work at Sree Neelakanta Government Sanskrit College Pattambi before joining the Brennen College, Tellicherry where prominent politicians Pinarayi Vijayan and A. K. Balan were his students. Ravi Varma was married to Sree Devi and the couple resided in Trichur. Ravi Varma died on 26 July 2019. He was 88 and was undergoing treatment for pneumonia in a private hospital in Trichur.

== Legacy ==
Ravi Varma's poems ignored the metre and used free verse and he was one among the group of poets who pioneered modernism in Malayalam literature. His oeuvre consists of several poems compiled under three anthologies, translation of four novels from Tamil which include two of Sundara Ramaswamy and one of Rajathi Salma, two books of translation of Tamil poetry and an edited work of poems of young writers. It was Ravi Varma who translated the Bhakthi poems on the Malayalam calendar in vattezhuthu script published by Moozhikulam Sala.

== Awards and honours ==
Attoor Ravi Varma received the Kerala Sahitya Akademi Award for Poetry for his poetry anthology, Attoor Ravi Varmayute Kavitakal in 1996 and he received the Asan Smaraka Kavitha Puraskaram in 1997, the same year as he received the Kerala Sahitya Akademi Award for Translation for Oru Pulimarathinte Katha, his translation of the debut novel by Sundara Ramaswamy. The Sahitya Akademi chose the anthology, Attoor Ravi Varmayute Kavitakal, for their annual award in 2001 and the second part of Attoor Ravi Varmayute Kavitakal fetched him the P. Kunhiraman Nair Award in 2005. The Government of Kerala honoured Ravi Varma with their highest literary award of Ezhuthachan Award in 2012 and three years later, he received the 2015 Vani Samnvay Distinguished Translator Award. The Kerala Sahitya Akademi inducted him as a distinguished fellow in 2017. He is also a recipient of the Sahitya Akademi Translation Prize by Kendra Sahitya Akademi, Premji Award, E. K. Divakaran Potti Award, Deviprasadam Trust Award (2010), and Mahakavi Pandalam Kerala Varma Kavitha Award. Maruvili is a documentary film made on the life and work of Ravi Varma, directed by Anvar Ali.

== Bibliography ==
=== Poetry ===
- Ravi Varma Attoor. Kavitha. Calicut: Poorna Publications.
- Attoor Ravi Varma (1995). Attoor Ravi Varmayude Kavithakal (1957–1994). Kottayam: D. C. Books.
- Ravi Varma Attoor (1995). Attoor Ravi Varmayude Kavithakal (1995–2003). Kottayam. ISBN 9788171305438.
- Ravi varma, Attoor; Surendran, V. U. (2016). Malayalathinte priya kavithakal. Thrissur: Green Books. ISBN 9789386120212.
- Ravi Varma, Attoor (2012). Attoor kavithakal. Kottayam: D.C.Books. ISBN 9788126434473.

=== Translation from Tamil to Malayalam ===
- Sundara Ramaswamy (1998). J. J. Chila Kurippukal. Translated by Attoor Ravi Varma. DC Books. ISBN 9788171308873. Archived from the original on 17 September 2013. "translation of J. J. Silakuripukal"
- Sundara Ramaswamy (2014). Oru Pulimarathinte Katha. Translated by Attoor Ravi Varma. SPCS. ISBN 978-9384571399. "translation of Oru Pulimarathin Kathai"
- Rajathi Salma (2009). Randaam Yaamangalute Katha. DC Books. ISBN 978-81-264-2311-8. "translation of the Tamil novel, Irandaam Jaamangalin Kathai"
- G. Nagarajan (2000). Nale Mattoru Nal Mathram. Translated by Attoor Ravi Varma. DC Books.
- Ravi Varma, Attoor, ed. (2003). Puthunaanooru: Tamizh kavithakalude mozhimaattam. Thrissur: Current Books. ISBN 9788122602975.
- Bhakti kavyam (Translation of Nayanars and Azhvars)

=== Edited poems ===
- Attoor Ravi Varma, ed. (1999). Puthumozhi vazhikal. Thrissur: Current Books.

== See also ==
- Malayalam literature
- List of Malayalam-language authors
