= Church Mission Society Higher Secondary School, Thrissur =

CMS Boys Higher Secondary School, Thrissur
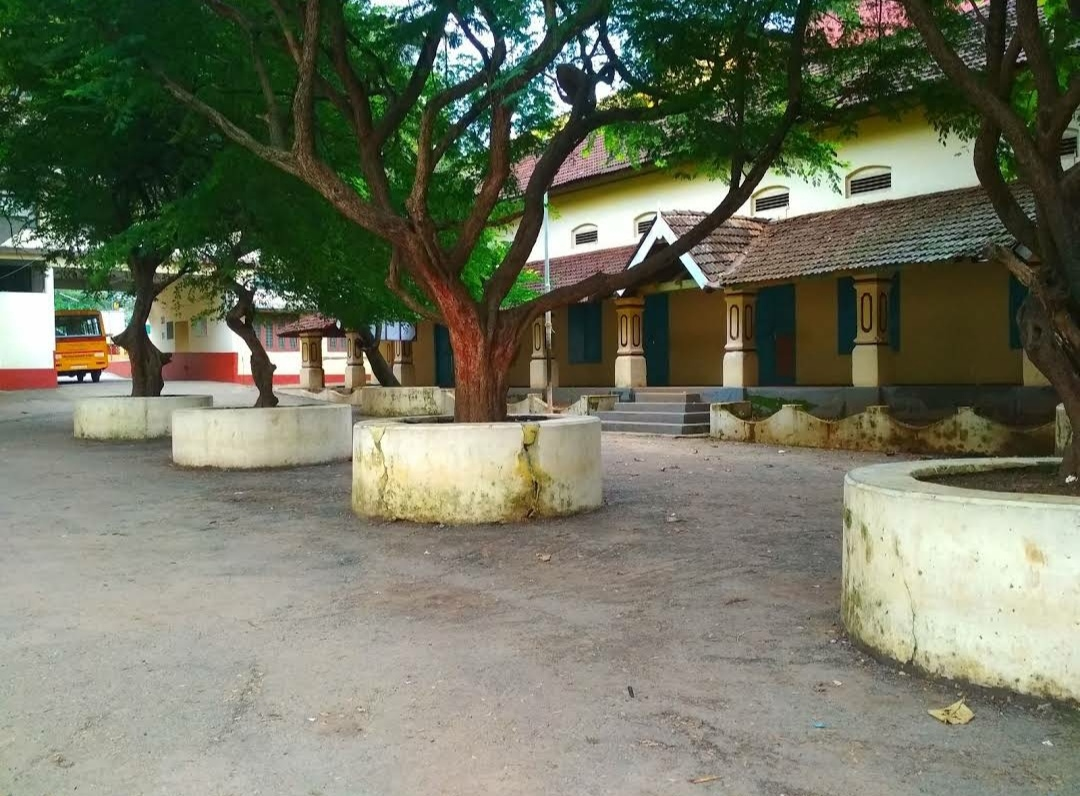

Location
- Thrissur, Kerala; India; 10.527573°N 76.21447°E

Information
- Type: State School
- Established: Lower Primary School - 1845; 181 years ago Current School - 1883; 143 years ago
- Principal: A D Francis
- Headmaster: Saji Samuel
- Nickname: CMS Boys

Church Mission Society Boys Higher Secondary School (CMS HSS) is a higher secondary school located in Thrissur city, of Kerala state, in India. The school was started by CMS missionary in 1845. CMS Boys HSS, Thrissur is one of the oldest school in the state of Kerala. The school gives instruction in Malayalam and English and follows the Kerala state syllabus. It has classes from LKG to 12th (+2) standard.

== History ==
The Church Mission Society started their activities in thrissur in the year 1836. Subsequently they started a lower primary school at mission quarters in East Fort Thrissur on 1845 by Reverend father Henry Harley and he was the missioner of CMS. The current school started in 1883. It is located in the heart of the city (Thrissur Swaraj Round). CMS Boys School is the first Government Aided School in thrissur city and one of the oldest school in kerala.

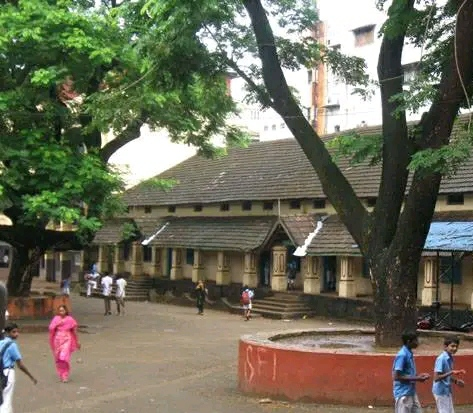
Old Block

== About ==
The School Gives Instruction in Malayalam and English and follows the Kerala state syllabus. It has classes from LKG to 12th (+2) standard with Science(Biology), Commerce(Computer application), Humanities(Social Work). The dress code is sky blue shirt and white pants

== Notable alumni ==
- C. Achutha Menon, 4th Chief Minister of Kerala State
- Cheril Krishna Menon, Entrepreneur, Philanthropist, Lawyer, Holder of Padma Shri
- I M Vijayan, Ex-Indian football captain, Holder of Padma Shri and Arjuna Award in 2003, Officer in Kerala Police
- M. K. Kannan, Former Member of Kerala Legislative Assembly
- M. P. Parameswaran, Indian Nuclear Scientist, Author
- Paul Poovathingal, CMI Priest
- P. Ramdas, First Neo-realistic Malayalam Movie Maker of "News Paper Boy"
- Puthezhath Raman Menon, Historian, Judge High Court of Kerala
- Sadiq (Indian actor), Malayalam film industry
- Sukumaran, Indian film actor and producer
- Sunil Sukhada, Indian film Actor
