= Puthezhath Raman Menon =

Indian writer

- Born: 19 October 1891; Manaloor, Kingdom of Cochin
- Died: 22 September 1973 (aged 81); Kerala
- Education: Church Mission Society Higher Secondary School, Thrissur; Maharaja's College, Ernakulam; Madras Christian College
- Occupations: Essayist, historian, translator
- Spouse: Janaki Amma
- Children: 10, including Rema Menon
- Parents: Parameshwara Menon (father); Pappi Amma (mother)
- Awards: Sahitya Kushalan; 1971 Kerala Sahitya Akademi Fellowship

Puthezhath Parameshwara Raman Menon (19 October 1891 – 22 September 1973) was an Indian writer of Malayalam literature. Known for essays, historical writings, biographies and translations, Menon was the first to translate Tagore's works into Malayalam. He was a judge at the Kerala High Court and a recipient of the title, Sahitya Kushalan, conferred on him by the Rajah of Cochin. Kerala Sahitya Akademi honoured him with the distinguished fellowship in 1971.

== Biography ==
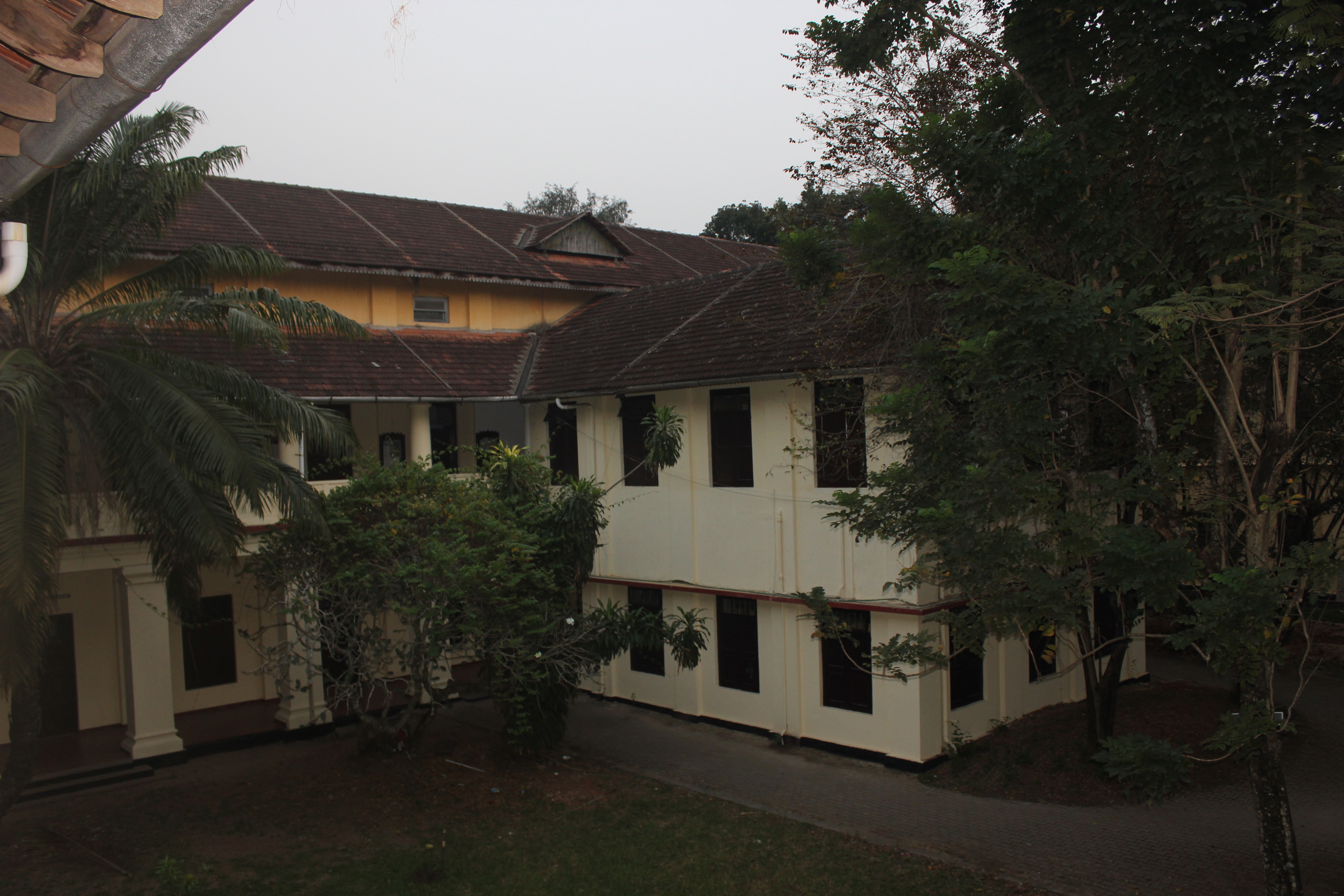
Maharaja's College, Ernakulam

Puthezhath Raman Menon was born in an ancient Nair family on 19 October 1891 at Manaloor, in Thrissur district of the South Indian state of Kerala to Kodaykkattu Parameshwara Menon and Pappi Amma "Padmavati". Raman got his family name, Puthezhath, through matrilineal succession.

After completing school education at Church Mission Society Higher Secondary School, Thrissur, he did his regular college education at Maharaja's College, Ernakulam and Madras Christian College before securing a degree in law to start a career as a lawyer at Thrissur. Later, he became a special prosecutor at the Magistrate Court in Thrissur and went on to hold such positions as those of a District Judge and Sarvadhikaryakkar to end his official career as a judge of the Kerala High Court.

Menon, who served as the president of the Kerala Sahitya Akademi for five years from 1961 to 1966, was married to Moothedathu Janaki Amma, who was the foster daughter of one of his uncles. He died on 22 September 1973, at the age of 81.

== Legacy and honours ==
Menon's entry into literature was by publishing humorous satires but later, he wrote general essays, biographies, historical books and translations. He was the first to translate the works of Rabindranath Tagore into Malayalam. His book, Sakthan Thampuran - Historical Novel, published in 1942, is one of the small number of books which detail the life of Sakthan Thampuran, the erstwhile Rajah of Cochin. His essays on Thrissur was later compiled as a book, Thrissur Trichur which has details about the cultural history of the place, its literary milieu and about Thrissur Pooram. He was also associated with Kairali magazine, where he worked alongside G. Sankara Kurup and Joseph Mundassery, though there were rumours of a rift between Kurup and Menon due to a remark made by Menon that no Malayalam writers deserved the Jnanapith Award, later won by Kurup in 1965.

Menon, whose autobiography was titled Kazhchappadukal, was conferred with the title of Sahitya Kushalan by the Rajah of Cochin. In 1971, he was inducted as a distinguished fellow by the Kerala Sahitya Akademi.

== Bibliography ==
- Raman Menon Puthezhath (1975). Chathuradhyayi.
- Raman menon Puthezhathu (1952). Sahithyabhiruji. Kottayam: N.B.S.
- Raman menon puthezhath (1968). Sahasrakirananaya Tagore. Kottayam: N.B.S.
- Raman Menon, Puthezhathu (1971). Sugreevasakhyam. Kerala sahithya academi: Kerala Sahithya Academy.
- Raman Menon, Puthezhathu (1956). Hanumanum Vibheeshananum. Kamalalaya: Kamalalaya.
- Raman Menon, Puthezhathu (1956). Bhaliyum Sugreevanum. Kamalalaya: Kamalalaya.
- Raman Menon, Puthezhath (1964). Ramayanathil ninnu. Kamalalaya.
- Raman Menon, Puthezhathu (1954). Veekshana Vilasam. Thiruvananthapuram: Kamalalaya.
- Raman Menon, Puthezhathu (1964). Chinthamagnan. Current Books, Trichur: Current Books.
- Raman Menon, Puthezhathu (1962). Kalavilasam. Aamina Bk Stall: Aamina Book Stall.
- Raman Menon, Puthezhathu (1936). Damodaran nayarude diary. S.P.C.S.
- Raman Menon, Puthezhathu (1964). Sahithya sanukkalil. Mangalodayam: Mangalodayam.
- Raman Menon, Puthezhath (1954). Pusthaka pooja. Mangalodayam.
- Raman Menon Puthezhathu (1955). Arivulla anjanikal. Kottayam: N.B.S.
- Raman Menon, Puthezhathu (1972). Chithariya Chinthakal. S. K. V. Book Depot.
- Raman Menon Puthezhathu (1963). Yavaneswaranmar. P.K.Brothers.
- Raman menon puthezhath (1964). Upanyasa chandrika. P.K.Brothers: P.K.Brothers.
- Raman menon puthezhath (1964). Sahithya sadanam. P.K.Brothers: P.K.Brothers.
- Raman Menon, Puthezhathu (1992). Kaazhchappaadukal (aathmakatha). Thrissur, Sulabha Books.
- Raman Menon, Puthezhathu (1997). Thrissur-Trichur. Thrissur, Sulabha Books.
- Raman Menon, Puthezhath (1999). Raamaayana saparya. Thrissur, Sulabha Books.
- Raman Menon, Puthezhath (1997). Keralathe ariyuka. Thrissur, Sulabha Books.
- Raman Menon, Puthezhath. Harinakshi. Mangalodayam.
- Raman Menon, Puthezhath (1942). Sakthan Thampuran.

== See also ==
- List of Malayalam-language authors by category
- List of Malayalam-language authors
