= Sangeetha Sreenivasan =

Indian writer and translator

- Born: July 19, 1975 (age 51); Mulankunnathukavu, Thrissur district, Kerala
- Occupations: Short story writer, novelist
- Spouse: P. K. Sreenivasan
- Children: 1
- Parent(s): Sarah Joseph (author); Kottakkal Joseph
- Writing career
- Notable works: Acid; Salabham Pookkal Aeroplane
- Notable awards: Kerala Sahitya Akademi Award for Translation

Sangeetha Sreenivasan is a novelist, children's writer, translator, and teacher from Kerala, India. She writes in Malayalam and English and also translates into both languages. In 2020, she received Kerala Sahitya Akademi Award for Translation for Upekshikkappetta Dinangal, the Malayalam translation of the novel The Days of Abandonment by Italian author Elena Ferrante. She is the daughter of writer activist Sarah Joseph.

== Biography ==
Sangeetha was born on July 19, 1975, in Mulankunnathkavu in Thrissur district of Kerala to writer Sarah Joseph and the public activist Kottakkal Joseph. She is known in various fields of literature like novel, children's literature, translation and also is a guitarist and teacher. She who holds a master's degree in English Literature from Kerala Verma College, Thrissur works as a teacher in the Kerala Government Higher Secondary Department.

=== Personal life ===
Sangeetha and her husband architect P. K. Sreenivasan have one daughter, Medha Sreenivasan.

== Literary career ==
Sangeetha first started writing in English. In 2004, one of her story was published in Indian Literature magazine. Her first short story collection in English, Penguins Who Lost the March was published by Yathi books. She later wrote two children's books, Vellimeenchattam and Kallithallakal Vs Sinkakkuttikal. Aparakanthi is Sangeetha's first novel. She later translated her second novel Acid in Malayalam, to English. She says she wants to write about women's lives without a barrier and about women's sexuality. She says that her mother's influence on her writing and life is immense.

== Receptions ==
Methil Radhakrishnan has dedicated his book Methil Kavithakal to Sangeetha and wrote "to my best friend who wrote the book Penguin Who Lost the March" in the introduction.

Actor and director Madhupal decided to make her novel Aparakanthi into a film and Sangeetha wrote the script as per his request but due to some circumstances the film was later cancelled.

=== Novel Acid ===
Sangeetha's most critically acclaimed novel is Acid, originally written in Malayalam and later translated to English. Sonali Majumdar from Hindustan Times wrote Acid as a tempestuous and turbulent trip, which is hallucinogenic, haywire, and is filled with a melancholia that is hard to shake off. Writer K. R. Meera in a review published in The Hindu, wrote that the book is likely a first book to go deep into unapologetic handling of same-sex affinity between two women. In a review published in The Telegraph India, S. D. Chaudary states that, as the possessor of a loneliness unique to each character, the novel does not deny the complexities of life that the characters go through. She also wrote that the image used to describe the emptiness of the characters is strong. Apoorva Sripathi of Scroll.in describes Acid as a hallucinatory novel that overturns traditional ideas of family and motherhood. Rahul Radhakrishnan from Indian express writes that, in Acid, Sangeetha combines the life of insecure characters with Middle-class urban life, nuclear family unrest, marital discomfort, variations of sexuality, the intensity of intoxication, the new generation of definitions of human relationships, and above all, the colors, rhythms, and stumbles of a metropolis that never sets at night.

== Works ==
=== Novels ===
- Shalabham, Pookkal, Aeroplane (in Malayalam). Kottayam, Kerala State, India: DC Books. October 2018. ISBN 9789352824380.
- Acid (in Malayalam). Kottayam, Kerala State, India: DC books. June 2016. ISBN 9788126467136.
- Aparakanti (in Malayalam) (3rd ed.). Kottayam, Kerala State, India: DC books. July 2014. ISBN 978-8126442478.

=== Translations ===
- Upekshikkappetta Divasangal (in Malayalam). Megha Books. 2017. ISBN 978-9384665180.. Translation of Elena Ferrante's Days of Abandonment
- Acid. Gurgaon, Haryana, India: Penguin Hamish Hamilton. 2018. ISBN 978-0670090914.. Translation of her own Malayalam novel Acid.
- Budhini. Gurgaon, Haryana, India: Penguin Hamish Hamilton. 2021. ISBN 978-0670093830.. Translation of Sarah Josep's Malayalam novel Budhini.
- Her translation of one of George Simenon's Maigret novels is about to publish by Mathrubhumi Books.
- She is currently translating Chris Kraus's cult feminist classic I Love Dick.

=== Short story collection ===
- Kallithallakal Vs Sinkakkuttikal (in Malayalam). Thrissur: Current Books. 2014. ISBN 9788122611045. Children's literature
- Vellimeenchattam (in Malayalam). DC books. 1 January 2010. ISBN 978-8126432264. Children's literature.
- Penguins Who Lost the March. Yathi books. 2005.

== Awards and honors ==
- Kerala Sahitya Akademi Award for Translation 2020 for Upekshikkappetta Dinangal, the Malayalam translation of the novel The Days of Abandonment by Italian author Elena Ferrante
- Thoppil Ravi award 2017 for Acid(Malayalam)
- Malayattoor Award 2015 for Aparakanthi
- Nooranad Haneef Novel Award
