= The Kite Runner =

2003 novel by Khaled Hosseini

- First edition cover (US hardback)
- Author: Khaled Hosseini
- Cover artist: Honi Werner
- Language: English
- Genre: Historical fiction; Tragedy; Classic; Coming-of-age; Literary realism
- Publisher: Riverhead Books
- Publication date: May 29, 2003
- Publication place: United States
- Pages: 371
- ISBN: 1-57322-245-3
- OCLC: 51615359
- Dewey Decimal: 813/.6 21
- LC Class: PS3608.O832 K58 2003

The Kite Runner is the debut novel of Afghan-American author Khaled Hosseini. Published in 2003 by Riverhead Books, it tells the story of Amir, a young Afghan boy from Wazir Akbar Khan, Kabul. The story is set against a backdrop of tumultuous events, beginning with the collapse of Afghanistan's monarchy and the Afghan conflict that sparked shortly thereafter, with a particular focus on the Soviet–Afghan War and the exodus of Afghan refugees, as well as the rise of the Taliban regime.

Hosseini has commented that he considers The Kite Runner to be a father–son relationship story, emphasizing the familial aspects of the narrative, an element that he continued to use in his later works. Themes of guilt and redemption feature prominently in the novel, with a pivotal scene depicting an act of sexual assault inflicted upon Amir's friend Hassan, which Amir fails to prevent, and which ends their friendship. The latter half of the book centers on Amir's attempts to atone for this transgression by rescuing Hassan's son two decades later.

The Kite Runner became a bestseller after being printed in paperback and was popularized in book clubs. It appeared on the New York Times best-seller list for over two years, with over seven million copies sold in the United States. Reviews were generally positive, though parts of the plot drew significant controversy in Afghanistan. A number of adaptations were created following publication, including a 2007 film of the same name, several stage performances, and a graphic novel. The novel is also available in a multi-CD audiobook narrated by the author.

== Plot ==
=== Part I ===
Amir, a well-to-do Pashtun boy, and Hassan, a Hazara boy who is the son of Ali, Amir's father's live-in servant, spend their days kite fighting in the hitherto peaceful city of Kabul. Hassan is a successful "kite runner" for Amir; he knows where the kite will land without watching it. Both boys are motherless, Amir's mother having died in childbirth, while Hassan's mother abandoned their family. Amir's father, a wealthy merchant known to Amir affectionately as Baba, loves both boys, even paying to have Hassan's cleft lip surgically corrected. When criticized by Baba for being insufficiently masculine, Amir grows jealous of Hassan, and finds a kinder fatherly figure in Rahim Khan, Baba's closest friend, who understands him and supports his interest in writing.

Assef, an older boy with a sadistic taste for violence, regularly mocks Amir for socializing with a Hazara, whose members, according to him, belong only in Hazarajat. One day, he prepares to attack Amir with brass knuckles, but Hassan defends Amir, threatening to shoot out Assef's eye with his slingshot. Assef backs off but swears to revenge.

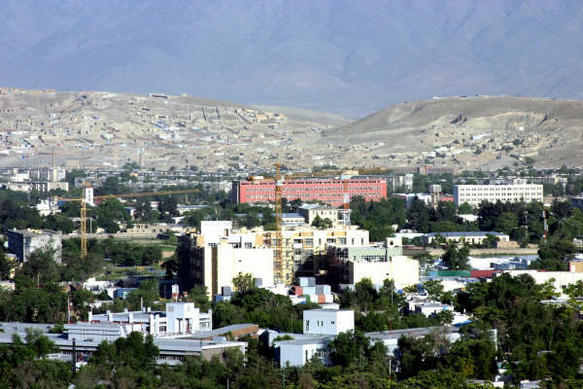
Wazir Akbar Khan neighborhood in Kabul, setting of Part I

One triumphant day, Amir wins the local kite-fighting tournament and finally earns Baba's praise. Hassan runs for the last cut kite, but encounters Assef in an alleyway. Hassan refuses to give up the kite, and Assef beats and rapes him. Amir witnesses the act but is too scared to intervene. Guilty and disturbed, Amir begins to reject Hassan, who deteriorates mentally and physically following the assault. To get rid of Hassan, Amir frames him for stealing, and Hassan falsely confesses to the crime. Though forgiven by Baba, Hassan and Ali leave for Hazarajat.

=== Part II ===
In 1979, five years later, the Soviet Union militarily intervened in Afghanistan. Baba and Amir escape to Peshawar, Pakistan, and then to Fremont, California, where Baba works in a gas station. After graduating from high school, Amir takes classes at San Jose State University to develop his writing skills. Every Sunday, Baba and Amir make extra money selling used goods at a flea market in San Jose. There, Amir falls in love with fellow refugee Soraya Taheri and her family. Baba is diagnosed with terminal cancer, and dies shortly after Amir and Soraya marry. The couple is happy together, but struggle to have children.

Amir embarks on a successful career as a novelist, and he and Soraya settle in San Francisco. Fifteen years after his wedding, Amir receives a call from a dying Rahim Khan, asking Amir to visit him in Peshawar. He enigmatically tells Amir, "There is a way to be good again."

=== Part III ===
From Rahim Khan, Amir learns that Hassan married and had a son, but was murdered after he refused to allow the Taliban to confiscate Baba and Amir's house in Kabul. Rahim Khan further reveals that Ali was sterile and was not Hassan's biological father. Hassan was actually the son of Sanaubar and Baba, making him Amir's half brother. Rahim Khan asks Amir to find and rescue Hassan's son, Sohrab, from an orphanage in Kabul.

Returning to Taliban-controlled Kabul, Amir learns from the orphanage that a Taliban official paid cash and forcibly took Sohrab away. He locates the Taliban official performing public executions at a football stadium, and secures a meeting at his house. There, the official is revealed to be Assef, with Sohrab deliberately taken to assault and use as a dancing boy. Assef agrees to relinquish him if Amir can escape the room alive, badly beating Amir with his brass knuckles. Sohrab intervenes, taking out Assef’s eye with his father’s slingshot, and allowing them to escape.

Amir tells Sohrab of his plans to take him back to America and possibly adopt him, but bureaucratic problems force Amir to send Sohrab to an orphanage first. Terrified and traumatized, Sohrab attempts suicide by cutting his wrists. Amir eventually manages to take him back to the United States with the help of Soraya, but Sohrab remains completely withdrawn and refuses to interact with them.

One day, Amir, Soraya, and Sohrab go to a park with other Afghans, where some are flying kites. Amir buys Sohrab a kite, and they engage in a kite fight with another boy, winning using one of Hassan’s favorite tricks. Seeing Sohrab smile for the first time, Amir runs the kite for him just as Hassan once did.

== Themes ==
Because its themes of friendship, betrayal, guilt, redemption and the uneasy love between fathers and sons are universal, and not specifically Afghan, the book has been able to reach across cultural, racial, religious and gender gaps to resonate with readers of varying backgrounds.

— Khaled Hosseini, 2005

Khaled Hosseini identifies a number of themes that appear in The Kite Runner, but reviewers have focused on guilt and redemption. As a child, Amir fails to save Hassan in an act of cowardice and afterwards suffers from an all-consuming guilt. Even after leaving the country, moving to America, marrying, and becoming a successful writer, he is unable to forget the incident. Hassan is "the all-sacrificing Christ-figure, the one who, even in death, calls Amir to redemption". Following Hassan's death at the hands of the Taliban, Amir begins to redeem himself through the rescue of Hassan's son, Sohrab. Hosseini draws parallels during the search for Sohrab to create an impression of poetic justice; for example, Amir sustains a split lip after being severely beaten, similar to Hassan's harelip. Despite this, some critics questioned whether the protagonist had fully redeemed himself.

Amir's motivation for the childhood betrayal is rooted in his insecurities regarding his relationship with his father. The relationship between parents and their children features prominently in the novel, and in an interview, Hosseini elaborated:

Both [The Kite Runner and A Thousand Splendid Suns] are multigenerational, and so the relationship between parent and child, with all of its manifest complexities and contradictions, is a prominent theme. I did not intend this, but I am keenly interested, it appears, in the way parents and children love, disappoint, and in the end honor each other. In one way, the two novels are corollaries: The Kite Runner was a father-son story, and A Thousand Splendid Suns can be seen as a mother-daughter story.

When adapting The Kite Runner for the theatre, Director Eric Rose stated that he was drawn into the narrative by the "themes of betraying your best friend for the love of your father", which he compared to Shakespearean literature. Throughout the story, Amir craves his father's affection; his father, in turn, loves Amir but favors Hassan, going as far as to pay for plastic surgery to repair the latter's cleft lip.

== Development and publication ==
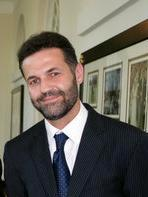
Khaled Hosseini, 2007

Khaled Hosseini lived and worked as a medical internist at Kaiser Hospital in Mountain View, California for several years before publishing The Kite Runner. In 1999, Hosseini learned through a news report that the Taliban had banned kite flying in Afghanistan, a restriction he found particularly cruel. The news "struck a personal chord" for him, as he had grown up with the sport while living in Afghanistan. He was motivated to write a 25-page short story about two boys who fly kites in Kabul. Hosseini submitted copies to Esquire and The New Yorker, both of which rejected it. He rediscovered the manuscript in his garage in March 2001 and began to expand it to novel format at the suggestion of a friend. According to Hosseini, the narrative became "much darker" than he originally intended. His editor, Cindy Spiegel, "helped him rework the last third of his manuscript", something she describes as relatively common for a first novel.

As with Hosseini's subsequent novels, The Kite Runner covers a multigenerational period and focuses on the relationship between parents and their children. The latter was unintentional; Hosseini developed an interest in the theme while in the process of writing. He later divulged that he frequently came up with pieces of the plot by drawing pictures of it. For example, he did not decide to make Amir and Hassan brothers until after he had "doodled it".

Like Amir, the protagonist of the novel, Hosseini was born in Afghanistan and left the country as a youth, not returning until 2003. Thus, he was frequently questioned about the extent of the autobiographical aspects of the book. In response, he said, "When I say some of it is me, then people look unsatisfied. The parallels are pretty obvious, but ... I left a few things ambiguous because I wanted to drive the book clubs crazy." Having left the country around the time of the Soviet invasion, he felt a certain amount of survivor's guilt: "Whenever I read stories about Afghanistan my reaction was always tinged with guilt. A lot of my childhood friends had a very hard time. Some of our cousins died. One died in a fuel truck trying to escape Afghanistan [an incident that Hosseini fictionalizes in The Kite Runner]. Talk about guilt. He was one of the kids I grew up with flying kites. His father was shot." Regardless, he maintains that the plot is fictional. Later, when writing his second novel, A Thousand Splendid Suns (then titled Dreaming in Titanic City), Hosseini remarked that he was happy that the main characters were women as it "should put the end to the autobiographical question once and for all."

Riverhead Books published The Kite Runner, ordering an initial printing of 50,000 copies in hardback. It was released on May 29, 2003, and the paperback edition was released a year later. Hosseini took a year-long absence from practicing medicine to promote the book, signing copies, speaking at various events, and raising funds for Afghan causes. Originally published in English, The Kite Runner was later translated into 42 languages for publication in 38 countries. In 2013, Riverhead released the 10th anniversary edition with a new gold-rimmed cover and a foreword by Hosseini. That same year, on May 21, Khaled Hosseini published another book called And the Mountains Echoed.

== Critical reception ==
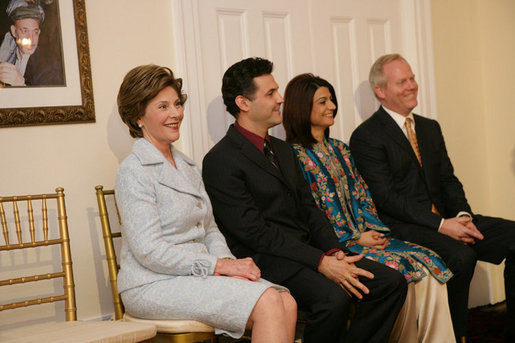
First Lady Laura Bush with Khaled Hosseini (first and second to the left); Bush praised The Kite Runner as "really great".

In the first two years following its publication, over 70,000 hardback copies of The Kite Runner were sold along with 1,250,000 paperback copies. Though the book sold well in hardback, "Kite Runner's popularity didn't really begin to soar until [2004] when the paperback edition came out, which is when book clubs began picking it up." It started appearing on best seller lists in September 2004 and became a New York Times bestseller in March 2005, maintaining its place on the list for two years. By the publication of Khaled Hosseini's third novel in 2013, over seven million copies had been sold in the United States. The book received the South African Boeke Prize in 2004. It was voted the Reading Group Book of the Year for 2006 and 2007 and headed a list of 60 titles submitted by entrants to the Penguin/Orange Reading Group prize (UK).

Erika Milvy from Salon praised it as "beautifully written, startling and heart wrenching". Tony Sims from Wired Magazine wrote that the book "reveals the beauty and agony of a tormented nation as it tells the story of an improbable friendship between two boys from opposite ends of society, and of the troubled but enduring relationship between a father and a son". Amelia Hill of The Observer opined, "The Kite Runner is the shattering first novel by Khaled Hosseini" that "is simultaneously devastating and inspiring." A similarly favourable review was printed in Publishers Weekly. Marketing director Melissa Mytinger remarked, "It's simply an excellent story. Much of it based in a world we don't know, a world we're barely beginning to know. Well-written, published at the 'right time' by an author who is both charming and thoughtful in his personal appearances for the book." Actor Aasif Mandvi agreed that the book was "amazing storytelling. ... It's about human beings. It's about redemption, and redemption is a powerful theme." First Lady Laura Bush commended the story as "really great". Said Tayeb Jawad, the 19th Afghan ambassador to the United States, publicly endorsed The Kite Runner, saying that the book would help the American public to better understand Afghan society and culture.

Edward Hower from The New York Times analyzed the portrayal of Afghanistan before and after the Taliban:

Hosseini's depiction of pre-revolutionary Afghanistan is rich in warmth and humour but also tense with the friction between the nation's different ethnic groups. Amir's father, or Baba, personifies all that is reckless, courageous and arrogant in his dominant Pashtun tribe ... The novel's canvas turns dark when Hosseini describes the suffering of his country under the tyranny of the Taliban, whom Amir encounters when he finally returns home, hoping to help Hassan and his family. The final third of the book is full of haunting images: a man, desperate to feed his children, trying to sell his artificial leg in the market; an adulterous couple stoned to death in a stadium during the halftime of a football match; a rouged young boy forced into prostitution, dancing the sort of steps once performed by an organ grinder's monkey.

Meghan O'Rouke, Slate Magazine's culture critic and advisory editor, ultimately found The Kite Runner mediocre, writing that "this is a novel simultaneously striving to deliver a large-scale informative portrait and to stage a small-scale redemptive drama, but its therapeutic allegory of recovery can only undermine its realist ambitions. People experience their lives against the backdrop of their culture, and while Hosseini wisely steers clear of merely exoticizing Afghanistan as a monolithically foreign place, he does so much work to make his novel emotionally accessible to the American reader that there is almost no room, in the end, for us to consider for long what might differentiate Afghans and Americans." Sarah Smith from The Guardian thought the novel started out well but began to falter towards the end. She felt that Hosseini was too focused on fully redeeming the protagonist in Part III and in doing so created too many unrealistic coincidences that allowed Amir the opportunity to undo his past wrongs.

=== Controversy in the United States ===
The American Library Association reported that The Kite Runner was one of its most-challenged books of 2008, with multiple attempts to remove it from libraries due to its "offensive language, sexually explicit [content], and unsuit[ability for] age group." Afghan American readers were particularly critical towards the depiction of Pashtuns as oppressors and Hazaras as the oppressed. Hosseini responded in an interview, "They never say I am speaking about things that are untrue. Their beef is, 'Why do you have to talk about these things and embarrass us? Don't you love your country?'" Afghan-Austrian journalist Emran Feroz, however, criticized the novel for oversimplifying ethnic relations in Afghanistan and portraying Pashtuns in general in an overly negative light. Feroz further expressed concern that works by Hosseini, who was raised in a culturally Tajik context rather than Pashtun, would prevent western readers from developing a more nuanced view of Afghanistan.

The Kite Runner was one of the most banned books in 2021-2022. As of 2024, the book has been banned from libraries at schools in Florida, Michigan, South Carolina, Tennessee, Texas, Utah, Pennsylvania, Idaho, and Wisconsin.

In February 2025, the United States Department of Defense flagged the book for temporary removal from Pentagon-run schools pending a review of its compliance with federal policies.

=== Film controversy in Afghanistan ===
The film generated more controversy through the 30-second rape scene, with threats made against the child actors, who originated from Afghanistan. Zekeria Ebrahimi, the 12-year-old actor who portrayed young Amir, had to be removed from school after his Hazara classmates threatened to kill him, and Paramount Pictures was eventually forced to relocate three of the children who starred in the movie to the United Arab Emirates. Afghanistan's Ministry of Culture banned the film from distribution in cinemas or DVD stores, citing the possibility that the movie's ethnically charged rape scene could incite racial violence within Afghanistan.

== Translations ==
Rema Menon translated this book into Malayalam under the title Pattam Parathunnavar.

Tzila Elazar (he) has translated the book in 2004 to Hebrew, under the title Rodef Ha'Afifonim.

== Adaptations ==
=== Film ===
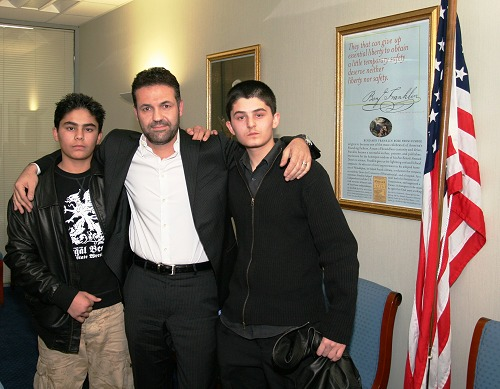
Khaled Hosseini with actors of The Kite Runner, Bahram and Elham Ehsas

Four years after its publication, The Kite Runner was adapted as a motion picture starring Khalid Abdalla as Amir, Homayoun Ershadi as Baba, and Ahmad Khan Mahmoodzada as Hassan. It was initially scheduled to premiere in November 2007, but the release date was pushed back six weeks to evacuate the Afghan child stars from the country after they received death threats. Directed by Marc Forster and with a screenplay by David Benioff, the movie won numerous awards and was nominated for an Academy Award, the BAFTA Film Award, and the Critics Choice Award in 2008. While reviews were generally positive, with Entertainment Weekly deeming the final product "pretty good", the depiction of ethnic tensions and the controversial rape scene drew outrage in Afghanistan. Hangama Anwari, the child rights commissioner for the Afghanistan Independent Human Rights Commission, commented, "They should not play around with the lives and security of people. The Hazara people will take it as an insult."

Hosseini was surprised by the extent of the controversy caused by the rape scene and said that Afghan actors would not have been cast had studios known that their lives would be threatened. He believed that the scene was necessary to "maintain the integrity" of the story, as a physical assault by itself would not have affected the audience as much.

=== Other ===
The novel was first adapted to the stage in March 2007 by Bay Area playwright Matthew Spangler where it was performed at San Jose State University. Two years later, David Ira Goldstein, artistic director of Arizona Theater Company, organized for it to be performed at San Jose Repertory Theatre. The play was produced at Arizona Theatre Company in 2009, Actor's Theatre of Louisville and Cleveland Play House in 2010, and The New Repertory Theatre of Watertown, Massachusetts in 2012. The theatre adaption premiered in Canada as a co-production between Theatre Calgary and the Citadel Theatre in January 2013. In April 2013, the play premiered in Europe at the Nottingham Playhouse, with Ben Turner acting in the lead role.

Hosseini was approached by Piemme, his Italian publisher, about adapting The Kite Runner to a graphic novel in 2011. Having been "a fan of comic books since childhood", he was open to the idea, believing that The Kite Runner was a good candidate to be presented in a visual format. Fabio Celoni provided the illustrations for the project and regularly updated Hosseini on his progress before its release in September of that year. The latter was pleased with the final product and said, "I believe Fabio Celoni's work vividly brings to life not only the mountains, the bazaars, the city of Kabul and its kite-dotted skies, but also the many struggles, conflicts, and emotional highs and lows of Amir's journey."

== See also ==
- 16 Days in Afghanistan listed as a reference film in Kite Runner's Study guide
- A Thousand Splendid Suns (Hosseini's second novel)
- And the Mountains Echoed (Hosseini's third novel)
