= The Fall of a Sparrow =

1985 book by Salim Ali

- Author: Salim Ali
- Language: English
- Genre: Autobiography
- Published: 1985
- Publisher: Oxford University Press
- Publication place: India
- Media type: Paperback
- Pages: 168
- ISBN: 978-0-19-561837-2

The Fall of a Sparrow is a autobiographical book by Salim Ali that was published in 1985 by Oxford University Press.

== Overview ==
The book was written towards the end of Salim Ali's life, with encouragement from R. E. Hawkins of Oxford University Press, which published it in 1985, just two years before his death in 1987 at age 91. Ali recalls the incident with the yellow-throated sparrow as a defining moment in his life, one that led him to pursue a career in ornithology, which was an uncommon path of study at the time, particularly for an Indian.

== Reception ==
In Textbook for Environmental Studies of University Grants Commission wrote "‘Fall of a Sparrow’ should be read by every nature enthusiast.".

Kalyani N, of Deccan Herald wrote "The Fall of a Sparrow has a little bit of everything — politics, society, history, geography, economics, education, and adventure, besides, of course, nature, environment and birds. There is a great deal of interesting trivia about Salim Ali’s life."

Dilip Bobb of India Today writes, "The reader's interest is sustained to the end, where Ali lays out what he terms his Articles of Faith in the epilogue in the form of imaginary questions and his answers to them ranging from religion, man's separateness from the rest of nature, the occult, and man's destiny, thus proving, if it were required, that within that frail frame beats the heart and mind of an intellectual who has enriched the world of ornithology, always the Cinderella of Indian zoology, as well as the lives of those who have been privileged to soar along with him at heights denied to lesser mortals."

The book has been on the syllabus of Literature and Ecology in Maharaja's College, Ernakulam. The book has to be read for the Post-Graduate Programme in English in Bishop Heber College.

Students are asked questions about this book to get Certificate Course in Birding in Maharshi Dayanand Saraswati University.

== Translations ==
K. B. Prasannakumar translated this book into Malayalam as Oru Kuruviyute Pathanam.
