= K. B. Prasannakumar =

Indian translator

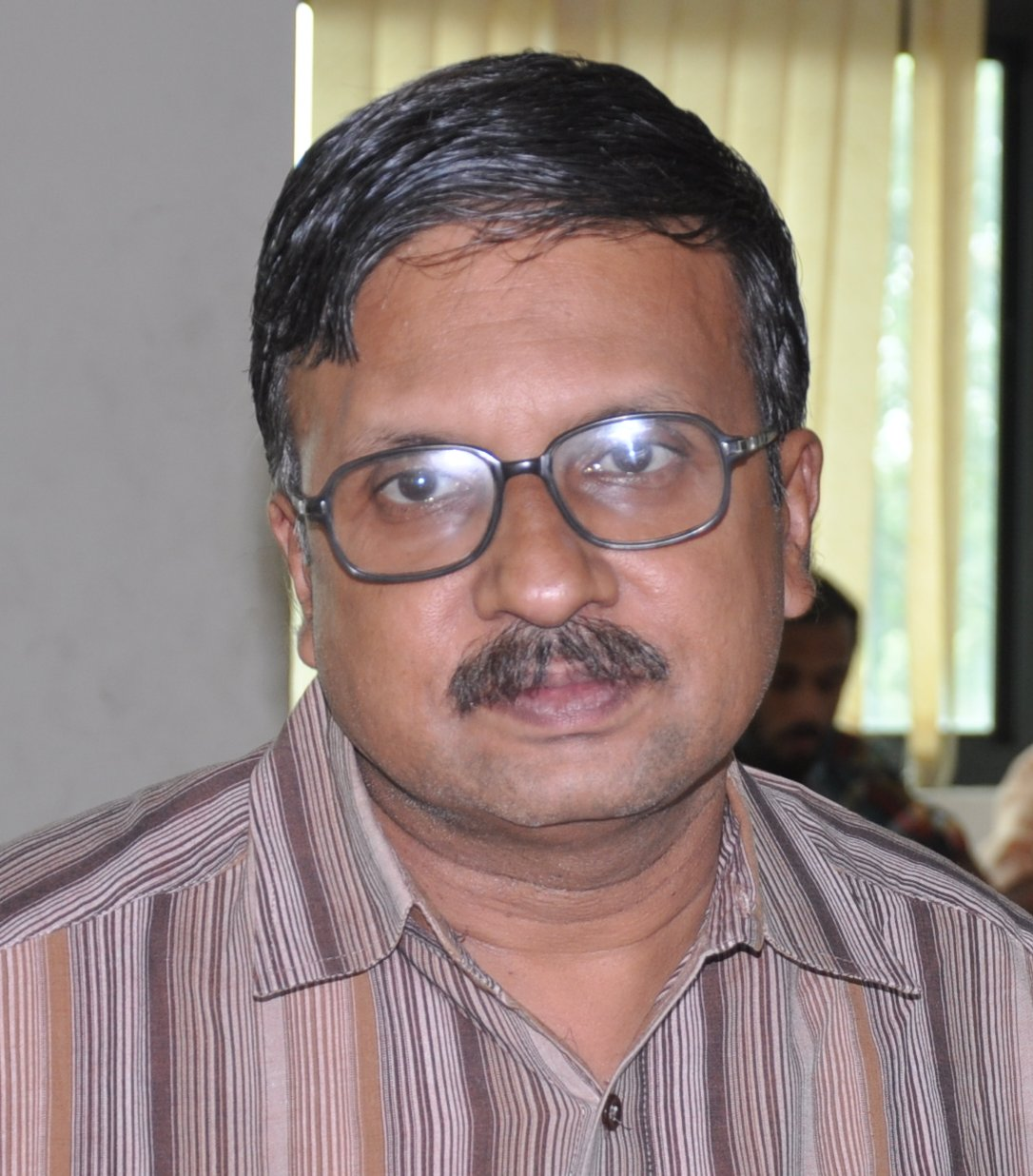
- Born: Vembally near Kuravilangad, Kottayam District, Kerala
- Occupations: Translator, literary critic
- Writing career
- Notable awards: Sahitya Akademi Translation Prize (2011); Kerala Sahitya Akademi Award for Translation (2011)

K. B. Prasannakumar is an Indian Malayalam language writer, literary critic and translator. In 2011, he won both Sahitya Akademi Award and the Kerala Sahitya Akademi Award for translation. He received the Kerala State Institute of Children's Literature Thiruvananthapuram Book Fair Award for Literary Criticism in 2012 for his book Athijeevikkunna Vakku

== Biography ==
K. B. Prasannakumar is a native of Vembally near Kuravilangad in Kottayam district of Kerala. His father is K.P. Bhaskara Kaimal and mother K. Thanka. He studied at Kumaranalloor Devi Vilasam High School and Deva Matha College, Kuravilangad. He graduated in Physics and obtained a postgraduate degree in Malayalam. He retired as an officer at State Bank of India.

Prasannakumar and his wife Radhika, who is an employee in LIC, have one daughter.

== Literary contributions ==
=== Literary criticism ===
Prasannakumar became interested in literary criticism when he began serious reading in the early nineteen eighties. Then he started writing literary criticism articles in the Samathalam magazine. His first article was on P. Kunhiraman Nair's poem Kaliyachan. He then wrote many other articles in the eighties and nineties and wrote a book called Athijeevikkunna Vakku (Meanig: The Surviving Word).

=== Travelogues ===
Prasannakumar, who has made several trips to the Himalayas, never intended to write a book about his travels, but he had written travel articles in local newspapers and magazines. Later, DC Books commissioned him to edit a book on Himalayan travels, Himalayam: Kazhcha, Darshanam. This was his first work on travel. The other travel books he wrote include Uttarakhand: Himalaya Devabhoomi (Manorama Publication, 2009), an anthology of poems on travel titled Sanchi, Malakalile Kattu Parayaunnathu (Prabhatham Book House, 2010), Himavazhiyile buddha sanchaarangal (Mathrubhumi Books, 2013; 2018), Jalakkannady (Ivory publishing house, 2020) and Sivam panchakedaram (Mathrubhumi Books, 2012) a travelogue on Panch Kedar.

=== Translations ===
Notes from the Himalayas is the collection of reminiscences of Ruskin Bond. Prasannakumar translated this book for Mathrubhumi Books. He translated Gao Xingjian's semi-autobiographical novel Soul Mountain into Malayalam as Athmashailam, Orhan Pamuk's Masumiyet Müzesi (The Museum of Innocence) as Nishkalankathayute Chithrasala, Dr. Salim Ali's autobiography The Fall of a Sparrow as Oru Kuruviyute Pathanam, and Mimlu Sen's Honey Gatherers as Bavul Jeevithavum Sangeethavum. He translated Sudhir Kakar's work Meera and Mahatma into Malayalam as Meerayum Mahathmavum and Roberto Calasso's Ka into Malayalam with the same title. He translated Gabriel García Márquez's My Melancholy Whores, a poetic novel, into Malayalam as Ente vishadaganikasmrithikal (D C books, 2022). He translated The Great Indian Novel by Shashi Tharoor into Malayalam as Maha(bharatha)kadha. In 2007, he translated Sophie's World (Norwegian: Sofies verden), by Norwegian writer Jostein Gaarder into Malayalam as Sophiyude Lokam.

== Awards and honors ==
Prasannakumar received the Sahitya Akademi Translation Prize from Sahitya Akademi Government of Indiafor translating Sudhir Kakar's work Meera and Mahatma into Malayalam as Meerayum Mahathmavum. He also received the Kerala Sahitya Akademi Award for Translation from Kerala Sahitya Akademi, Government of Kerala for his translation of Roberto Calasso's Ka into Malayalam. He received the Kerala State Institute of Children's Literature Thiruvananthapuram Book Fair Award for Literary Criticism in 2012 for his book Athijeevikkunna Vakku.
