= Qais Akbar Omar =

Afghan-American writer (born 1982)

- Born: 18 November 1982 (age 43); Kabul, Afghanistan
- Education: MFA creative writing
- Alma mater: Boston University
- Occupations: Writer, carpet producer
- Spouse: Mai Wang
- Writing career
- Language: English
- Period: 2013–present
- Genre: Memoir
- Notable work: A Fort of Nine Towers

Qais Akbar Omar (born November 18, 1982) is an Afghan-American writer. Omar is the author of A Fort of Nine Towers, an autobiography of his childhood in Afghanistan during the years of the civil war and the Taliban from 1992 to 2001.

== Biography ==
Omar was born in Kabul in 1982. He is the owner of Kabul Carpets, a business that his family has operated for four generations. When he was ten years old, the civil war broke out in Afghanistan following the withdrawal of Soviet troops in 1989. At the age of eleven, Omar learned the art of carpet-knotting from a Turkmen family who lived next door. After his family returned to Kabul under Taliban rule, he ran a secret carpet factory in his home.

He was admitted to Kabul University in 1999, where he studied journalism. Omar worked as an interpreter for the US military. He also worked for the UN, and served as a textiles specialist for USAID and the Asian Development Bank, helping carpet weavers across Afghanistan.

Omar moved to the United States in 2012 out of fear that he and his family would be harmed due to his political writing. While in the United States, he continued his education, which had been interrupted by the ongoing conflict in Afghanistan.

== Education ==
Omar completed his bachelor's degree in journalism at Kabul University. In 2007, he was invited to the University of Colorado as a visiting scholar. He earned a Master of Business Administration at Brandeis University. In 2014, he graduated from Boston University with a MFA in Creative Writing. In 2014–15, he was a Scholars at Risk Fellow at Harvard University.

== Published works ==
Omar's first literary work, the essay A Talib in Love, was published in 2012 in the anthology That Mad Game: Growing up in a War Zone. In 2013 he wrote the memoir A Fort of Nine Towers about his experiences growing up in Afghanistan. To date, A Fort of Nine Towers has been published in over twenty languages.

Omar is the co-author, with writer Stephen Landrigan, of Shakespeare in Kabul. An expanded version of this book entitled A Night in the Emperor's Garden: A True Story of Hope and Resilience in Afghanistan was published in October 2015. This book details the first performance of Shakespeare's Love's Labour's Lost in Afghanistan, and how a group of actors and actresses came together to perform in 2005. It was the first time women had appeared onstage in thirty years. The performances were publicized in many countries. Omar has also written for The Atlantic, The New York Times, and The Cairo Review of Global Affairs.

== Personal life ==
In September 2018, Omar married Mai Wang, a naturalized US citizen who moved from Beijing to the United States as a child. The couple met while studying creative writing at Boston University.

Omar serves as a goodwill ambassador for Aschiana Foundation in Kabul and for the Initiative to Educate Afghan Women.
