= C. K. Menon =

Indian entrepreneur and philanthropist (1949–2019)

Cheril Krishna Menon
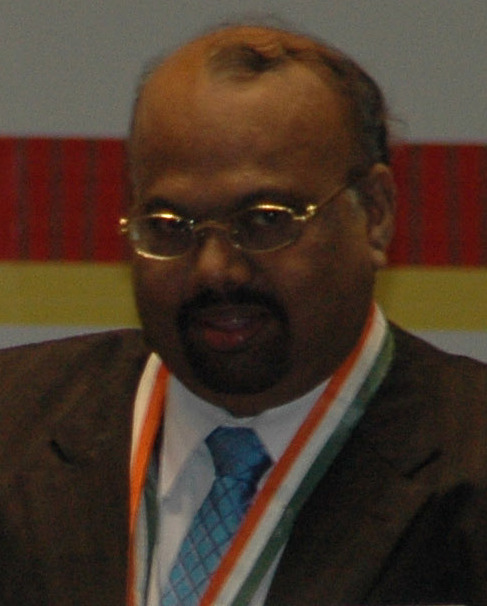
- Born: 18 September 1949; Thrissur, Kerala, India
- Died: 1 October 2019 (aged 70); Chennai, Tamil Nadu, India
- Occupations: Entrepreneur, Philanthropist, Lawyer
- Spouse: Jayasree K. Menon
- Children: Anjana; Sreeranjini; Jayakrishnan
- Parents: Puliyamkott Narayanan Nair; Cheril Karthyayani Amma
- Awards: Padma Shri; Pravasi Bharatiya Samman; Federal Bank Kerala Business Award; DIDIC Qatar National Award

Cheril Krishna Menon (18 September 1949 – 1 October 2019) was an Indian entrepreneur and philanthropist. He was the Chairman and Managing Director of Behzad Corporation, headquartered in Doha, Qatar, which has presence in many other countries. He received the 2006 Pravasi Bharatiya Samman and in 2009 received the fourth highest Indian civilian award, Padma Shri, from Government of India, in 2009, with. He died after prolonged illness at Apollo Hospital, Chennai on 1 October 2019, aged 70.

== Biography ==
Krishna Menon was born in Thrissur, in the South Indian state of Kerala, on 18 September 1949 to Cheril Karthyayani Amma and Puliyamkott Narayanan Nair, a local business man engaged in transport business. His schooling was at Church Mission Society High School, Thrissur (CMSHSS, Thrissur) after which he did his Pre University Course from St. Thomas College, Thrissur. He graduated from Sree Kerala Varma College, Thrissur and secured a graduate degree in Law from the Law College, Jabalpur. His career started as a lawyer at the High Court of Kerala, Kochi which he continued for two years before moving to Qatar in 1976.

Menon established Behzad Corporation, Doha, a fuel transportation company, in 1978, in partnership with Ali Bin Nasser Al Misnad, a Qatari citizen. Over the years, he diversified his business to cover finance, media, steel and infrastructure industries and has presence in many countries in the Middle East, American continent, Europe and in India. Besides heading his flagship company, Behzad Corporation, he was a director of business establishments such as Behzad Fuels (UK) Limited, Infrastructure Kerala Limited (INKEL), a Government of Kerala undertaking, JaiHind TV and Symphony TV and was chairman of Al Barakah Financial Services Limited, the first Islamic non banking finance company in Kerala, promoted by Kerala State Industrial Development Corporation (KSIDC) and TJSV Steel Fabrication and Galvanizing Limited.

Menon, who has been listed as the 20th richest non resident Indian in the Middle East by Arabian Business Magazine in 2011, was a member of many government constituted bodies. He was a permanent director and the vice chairman of Norka Roots, the field agency of the Department of Non Resident Keralites Affairs. He was on the board of directors of the India Development Foundation of Overseas Indians, a trust under the Ministry of Overseas Indian Affairs for promoting and channelising the philanthropic efforts of the non resident Indians. He was a nominated Ex Officio member of the Security Advisory Council to Civil Aviation, (SACCA) Government of India and served as the chairman of Bhavan's Public School (Al Misnad Education Centre), Doha, Qatar.

== Philanthropy ==
Krishna Menon is reported to have built and donated over 100 houses for the slum dwellers in Thrissur. He was involved with the Laksham Veedu Project and M. N. Laksham Veedu Restoration Project of the Government of Kerala. He was a patron and a major supporter of Adarsh Charitable Trust, a non governmental organization based in Tripunithura in Kochi, which runs various programs including a school for the mentally challenged children. He was also associated with the activities of the School of Bhagavat Gita, Thiruvananthapuram and is known to have donated a mosque to the Muslim community.

== Awards and recognitions ==
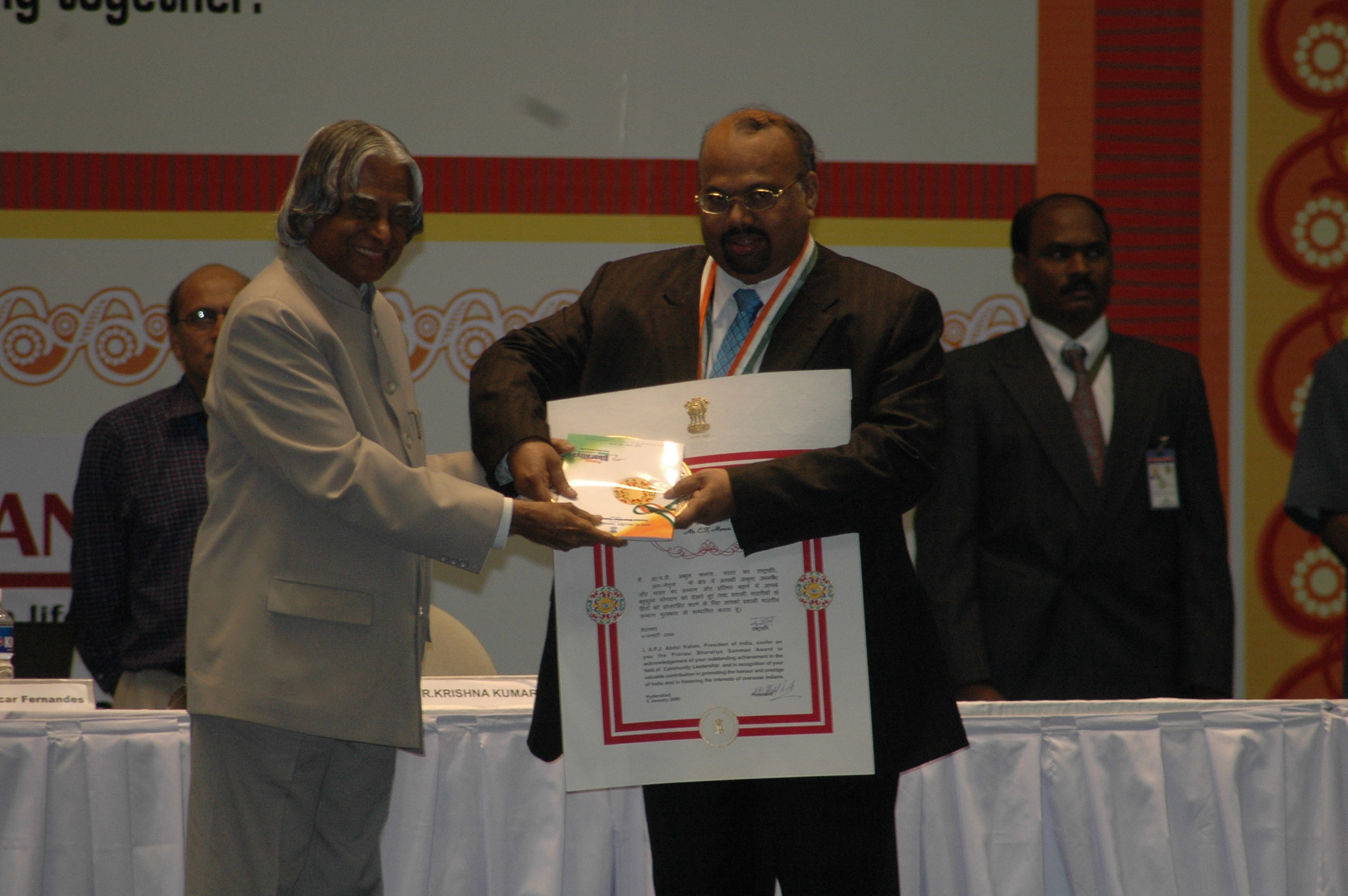
Menon receives Pravasi Bharatiya Samman from President of India in 2006

Krishna Menon received the Pravasi Bharatiya Samman from the Government of India in 2006. Three years later, the government honoured him again with the civilian award of Padma Shri in 2009. He received the Federal Bank Kerala Business Award from the World Malayali Council in 2011. He was also a recipient of the 2012 Qatar National Award from the Doha International Center for Interfaith Dialogue (DICID).

== Personal life ==
Menon was married to Jayasree K. Menon, with whom he had three children.

He was a regular sponsor of Puli kali in his hometown. He also sponsored the Maha Shivaratri celebrations at Vadakkumnathan Temple in Thrissur.

== Death ==
On 18 September 2019, his 70th birthday, Menon was diagnosed with viral fever which later on worsened into pneumonia and was undergoing treatment in Kochi, where he had lived for the past few years. Since his condition worsened, he was transferred to Appolo Hospital in Chennai, where he died in the night of 1 October. He was cremated with full state honours at the premises of his ancestral home in Thrissur. He is survived by his wife, children and grandchildren.

== See also ==
- List of Nairs
- Department of Non Resident Keralites Affairs
