= Acid (novel) =

Indian novel

- Author: Sangeetha Sreenivasan
- Translator: Sangeetha Sreenivasan (English)
- Language: Malayalam and English
- Genre: Novel
- Publisher: DC Books (Malayalam); Penguin Random House (English)
- Publication date: 2016
- Publication place: India
- English publication date: 2018
- ISBN: 9788126467136

Acid is an Indian psychedelic novel written by novelist Sangeetha Sreenivasan. Originally written in Malayalam, the author herself translated this into English. It is her third novel.

== Plot ==
Acid is a novel that focus on lives of two lesbian women named Kamala and Shaly, and Kamala's twin sons, Aadi and Shiva. Kamala lives in Bangalore with Shaly, her same-sex partner. They share an intense emotional and romantic relationship. Their lives are messy and heavily influenced by drug use, specifically LSD, which makes the story feel like a vivid, hallucinatory dream. Aadi is paralyzed, and Shiva spends his life taking care of him.

The novel discuss various topics like urban life of the middle class, the unrest of the nuclear family, the discomforts of marriage, the variants of sexuality, the intensity of intoxication, and new generation definitions of human relationships. Although the main characters are Kamala, Shaly, and Kamala's two children, there are also characters like Kamala's husband Madhavan, the maid Janu, and Shaly's mother.

== Reception ==
Acid is one of Sangeetha's most critically acclaimed novels. If the novel were to be summed up in one line, it would be 'a stormy romance between two spectacularly strong women,' writes Smita Verma in the Financial Express. Sonali Majumdar from Hindustan Times wrote Acid as a tempestuous and turbulent trip, which is hallucinogenic, haywire, and is filled with a melancholia that is hard to shake off. Writer K. R. Meera in a review published in The Hindu, wrote that the book is likely a first book to go deep into unapologetic handling of same-sex affinity between two women. In a review published in The Telegraph India, S. D. Chaudary states that, as the possessor of a loneliness unique to each character, the novel does not deny the complexities of life that the characters go through. She also wrote that the image used to describe the emptiness of the characters is strong. Apoorva Sripathi of Scroll.in describes Acid as a hallucinatory novel that overturns traditional ideas of family and motherhood. Rahul Radhakrishnan from Indian express writes that, in Acid, Sangeetha combines the life of insecure characters with Middle-class urban life, nuclear family unrest, marital discomfort, variations of sexuality, the intensity of intoxication, the new generation of definitions of human relationships, and above all, the colors, rhythms, and stumbles of a metropolis that never sets at night.

In an article written in Manorama Online under the title Veeryamerum vishalayani, Njettikkum ee acid (meaning:A powerful poison, This acid will shock you), G. Pramod criticizes the cover page of the Malayalam edition for giving a tag line that suggests that this is a lesbian novel. He writes that this will disappoint readers who come looking for a lesbian centred novel after reading this tag, that love between two women is only one of the many topics the novel deals with, and that even after reading the entire novel, what sticks in the mind is not lesbian love as the central theme, but rather the life crises of the modern, urban-centered era, the increasing infidelity, including in marital relationships, people eager to break the barriers of moral and ethical laws, and the tragedies of drug abuse in the life.

== Awards ==
The Malayalam edition of the novel received the Thoppil Ravi award in 2017.
