= Sunil Naliyath =

Indian Malayalam-language writer and translator

- Born: 1969 (age 56–57); Calcutta, West Bengal, India
- Occupations: Writer, translator
- Writing career
- Notable awards: Sahitya Akademi Translation Prize 2022; Kerala Sahitya Akademi Award for Translation 2014

Sunil Naliyath is a Malayalam language writer and translator from Kerala, India. He translated many noted literary works in Bengali to Malayalam. He received many awards including the Kerala Sahitya Akademi Award for Translation in 2014 and the Sahitya Akademi Award for Translation in 2022.

== Biography ==
Sunil was born in 1969 in Calcutta (Kolkata), West Bengal as the son of T. P. Naliath, who was a political activist, writer, rationalist and a newspaper editor. His father, T. P. Naliath, was an early publisher and editor of the publication Kerala Rashmi in Kolkata. Soon after his birth, he came to Tiruvankulam in Ernakulam district of Kerala with his mother.

Sunil studied from 1st to 7th standard in Tiruvankulam. He then returned to West Bengal with his family and studied at the Andhra Association Education Trust's School in Calcutta. Even while in Bengal, his father's collection of Malayalam books and the Malayalam publications he purchased helped him maintain his connection with his mother tongue, Malayalam. Bengali was studied as a third language in his English undergraduate studies. It was during his undergraduate studies that he was attracted towards Bengali literary works too.

== Career ==
Immediately after college, he got a job in Calcutta. At that time, Sunil wrote features on Bengal football in many publications in Kerala. Later he worked as Calcutta Correspondent of Mathrubhumi newspaper and from 1997 to 1999 he was the representative of Mathrubhumi.

== Literary career ==
The notes written during his childhood were published in the Trial weekly published at that time under the editorship of M. P. Narayana Pillai. Later, stories were published in the publication Katha and in the Balapamkti (column for children's literature) of Desabhimani.

Sunil's first published translation was a translation of a Bengali story by Suchitra Bhattacharya, which he wrote for the women writers' story edition published by Grihalakshmi magazine in Malayalam. Suchitra Bhattacharya, who liked Sunil's translation, later gave Sunil the right to translate all her works. He then decided to translate the works of other noted Bengali writers into Malayalam and translated the works of Mahasweta Devi, Sunil Gangopadhyay, Taslima Nasrin, Manoranjan Byapari etc. into Malayalam. For the translation of Mahasweta Devi's novel Operation Bashai Tudu, he won the Sahitya Akademi Award for Translation.

== Selected books ==
- Kolkata cafe (in Malayalam). Mathrubhumi books. 2022. ISBN 9789355494085. Translation of 8 Bengali short stories.
- Bashai Tudu (in Malayalam). Mathrubhumi books. ISBN 9788182674295. Translation of Bengali novel by Mahasweta Devi.
- Paschim Dikande Pradosha Kale (in Malayalam). Mathrubhumi books. Translation of Bengali novel by Vikraman Nair.
- Durgashtami (in Malayalam). Sahitya Pravarthaka Cooperative Society. 2021. ISBN 9789391946494. Translation of 8 Bengali short stories.
- Amanushik (in Malayalam). Westland publications limited. ISBN 9789389152531. Translation of Bengali novel by Manoranjan Byapari.
- Chokher Bali (in Malayalam). Current books. Translation of Bengali novel by Rabindranath Tagore.
- Brahmaputhrayude theerath (in Malayalam). Green books. ISBN 9789387331587. Translation of Bengali novel by Taslima Nasrin.

== Awards and honours ==
- 2022 Sahitya Akademi Award for Translation (for Malayalam translation of Operation Bashai Tudu)
- 2014 Kerala Sahitya Akademi Award for Translation (for Malayalam translation of Chokher Bali)
- Tripunithura Municipal Council's Rajanagari Award (for Malayalam translation of Chokher Bali)
- Sankaran Nambiar Foundation's Prof. Kaliyath Damodaran Memorial Award (for Malayalam translation of Operation Bashai Tudu)
- Translation of Operation Bashai Tudu was also shortlisted for the first Indiewood Translation Award 2020.
