= Rafia Zakaria =

American journalist and author

Rafia Zakaria is a Pakistani-American attorney, feminist, journalist, and author. Zakaria is a columnist for Dawn. She has written for The Nation, Guardian Books, The New Republic, The Baffler, Boston Review, and Al Jazeera. In 2021, she published a book titled Against White Feminism, in which she critiques the emphasis that conventional feminist thought places on the experiences of white women while excluding women of color.

== Biography ==
Zakaria was born in Karachi, Pakistan, and was forced into an arranged marriage at 17 to a Pakistani-American man. Zakaria fled from her abusive husband in 2002 when she was 25. She entered law school and earned a postgraduate degree in political philosophy. Zakaria is a Muslim and identifies as a Muslim feminist. She has worked on behalf of victims of domestic abuse.

== Against White Feminism ==
In her 2021 book Against White Feminism, Zakaria critiqued the emphasis that conventional feminist thought places on the experiences of white women while excluding women of color. The book was reviewed by numerous established publications, including The Guardian and the Financial Times, as well as by the online magazine The Arts Fuse. A British commentator accused Zakaria of undermining the feminist movement and playing into the hands of patriarchy through her attacks on white feminism. On the podcast EU Scream, Zakaria rejected the harsh criticism she has received especially in Europe in reaction to her book, criticism which she considered mostly uninformed on the side of the commentators. Zakaria has been continuously raising her voice against white feminism and racial privilege.

== Bibliography ==
- The Upstairs Wife: An Intimate History of Pakistan. Boston: Beacon Press. 2016. ISBN 978-0807080467.
- Veil (Object Lessons). London: Bloomsbury Academic. 2017. ISBN 978-1501322778.
- Against White Feminism: Notes on Disruption. New York: W. W. Norton & Company. 2021. ISBN 978-1324006619. (Note: Briefly reviewed in the October 4, 2021 issue of The New Yorker, p.67.)

———————
