= Mohammad Kheirkhah Zoyari =

Iranian-American photographer

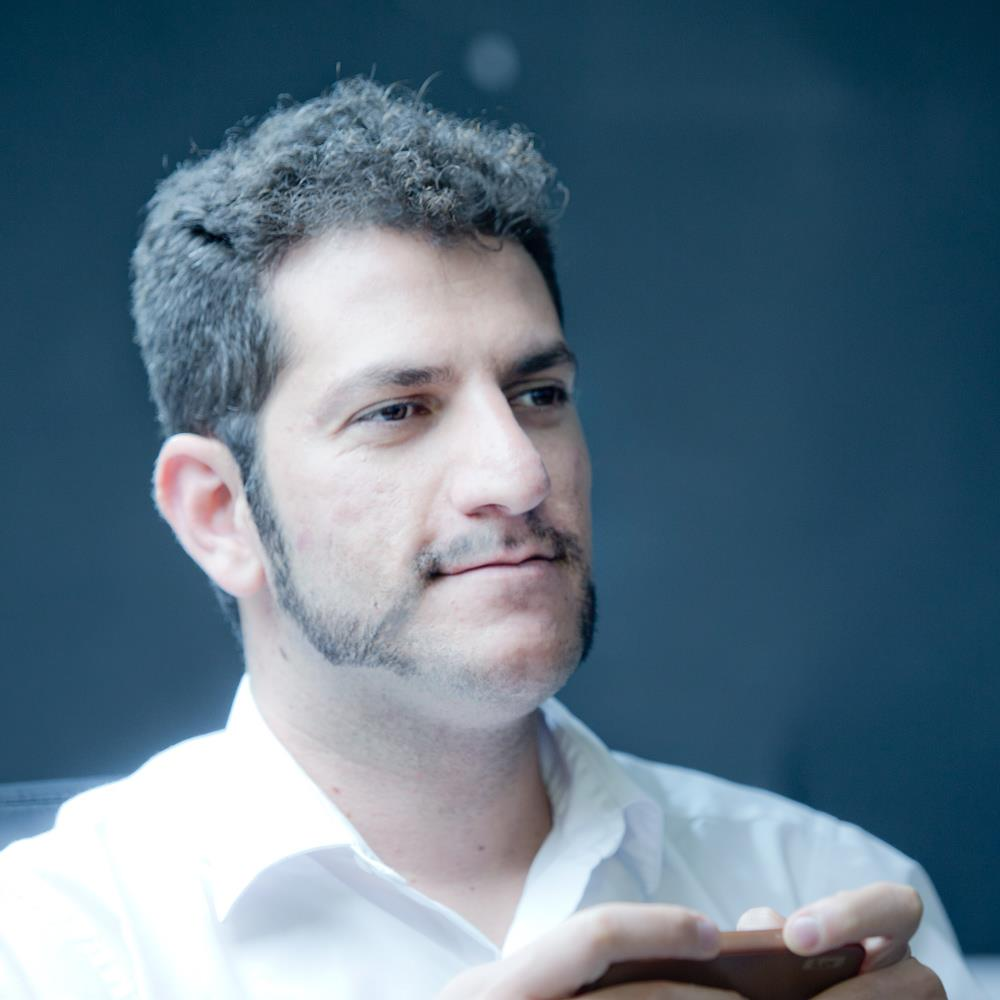
- Born: June 24, 1986 (age 40)
- Other name: Moe Zoyari
- Occupation: Photographer
- Website: www.zoyari.com

Mohammad Kheirkhah Zoyari (born 24 June 1986), also known as Moe Zoyari, is an Iranian-American photographer. He has won three Pictures of the Year International Awards.

== Career ==
Zoyari started his work as a photographer at the age of 14. After covering Iran's nuclear program, earthquakes, and political turmoil, he covered events in the Middle East, Europe and the United States. He left Iran after the turbulent aftermath of the Iranian presidential election, 2009 and went to Afghanistan for 44 days to be an embedded journalist with the U.S. Army.

Zoyari worked for BBC Persian from 2003 to 2004 and United Press International from 2005 to 2015. He is now represented by Redux Pictures. Moe was invited to The White House by President Obama, and The First Lady in 2015. His photographs have been published in Newsweek, Time, and Le Figaro. He has documented stories in more than 52 countries to be a voice for the deliberately silenced and preferably unheard people.

== Awards ==
- 2007: Picture of The Year, Award of excellence, General News Reporting, Pictures of the Year International 65, Missouri School of Journalism
- 2012: Best photographer of the year, PDNedu
- 2019: Reuters photojournalism grant

== Exhibitions ==
=== Solo exhibitions ===
- Forgotten Colors Sunnyvale Public Library, Sunnyvale, CA, 2010
- Iranian women Mah-e-Mehr Gallery in Tehran, Iran, July 2007
- Photo Exhibition in Qazvin, Iran 2006

=== Group exhibitions ===
- Just For Foreign Policy, New York, 2005
- 30 Years of Iranian Photography, Monnaie de Paris, 2009
- Today's Bam, A Photo exhibition on [Bam Earthquake] in Tehran Iran

== Publications ==
- Exile. Self-published, Blurb, 2012. ISBN 978-0-9857770-1-2. Work from Iran, India, Afghanistan, Turkey, Saudi Arabia, France, Italy, Germany, and the U.S.
