= Soniah Kamal =

Novelist

Soniah Kamal is a Pakistani-American writer. She is the author of two novels, An Isolated Incident (2014) and Unmarriageable (2019). The latter is a retelling of Jane Austen's Pride and Prejudice set in Pakistan in 2000 and 2001.

== Early life and education ==
Kamal was born in Karachi, Pakistan, and attended an English-medium school. She subsequently lived in England and Saudi Arabia, and then attended St. John's College in Annapolis, Maryland as an undergraduate, studying philosophy.

== Writing ==
=== An Isolated Incident ===
Kamal published her first novel, An Isolated Incident, in 2014. It is set in Kashmir, the United States, Afghanistan, and Pakistan. Reviewing the book for Dawn, Fareeha Rafique wrote, "Kamal’s beautiful use of language is what carries her story." An Isolated Incident was a finalist for the 2016 Townsend Prize for Fiction from The Chattahoochee Review and the Georgia Center for the Book.

=== Unmarriageable ===
Kamal's second novel, Unmarriageable, was published on January 22, 2019. The retelling of Jane Austen's Pride and Prejudice features Pakistani English teacher (and Austen fan) Alys Binat and her four sisters, a formerly high-society family that has fallen on comparatively hard times owing to family betrayal. Their mother is anxious to see her daughters married, particularly Alys and Jena (the two eldest), but the task is a challenge as the family has lost most of its money and former social standing.

Publishers Weekly called the book "a funny, sometimes romantic, often thought-provoking glimpse into Pakistani culture, one which adroitly illustrates the double standards women face when navigating sex, love, and marriage. This is a must-read for devout Austenites." Reviewing the novel for NPR, Ilana Masad wrote, "Kamal's Unmarriageable succeeds in being both a deliciously readable romantic comedy and a commentary on class in post-colonial, post-partition Pakistan, where the effects of the British Empire still reverberate."

== Personal life ==
Kamal has three children. She lives in Georgia.
