= Attoor (Kerala) =

- Village
- Location in Kerala, India
- Coordinates: 10.680°N 76.228°E
- Country: India
- State: Kerala
- District: Thrissur
- Taluka: Talappilly

Area
  - Total: 47.96 km^{2} (18.52 sq mi)

Population (2011)
  - Total: 7,327
  - Density: 1,418/km^{2} (3,670/sq mi)

Languages
  - Official: Malayalam
- Time zone: UTC+5:30 (IST)
- Telephone code: +91
- Nearest city: Shoranur
- Sex ratio: 1000:1109♂/♀
- Literacy: 79.75%
- Climate: Average high (°C) (Köppen)

Attoor is a village that is located in Kerala, India, in the Thrissur district. It has an area of roughly 48 square kilometers (18.5 square miles).

== Attoor (627732) ==
Attoor is a village in the Talappilly taluka of Thrissur district with an area of 4,796 hectares and harbouring 1,590 households with total population of 7,327 as per the 2011 Census. The nearest town Shoranur is at a distance of 8 km. Male population is 3,473 and female population is 3,854. Scheduled Caste Population is 974 and Scheduled Tribes population is 78. Census Location Code of the village is 627732.
