= A Thousand Splendid Suns =

2007 novel by Khalid Hosseini

- First edition cover
- Author: Khaled Hosseini
- Language: English
- Genre: Historical Fiction / War Literature
- Publisher: Riverhead Books (and Simon & Schuster audio CD)
- Publication date: May 22, 2007
- Publication place: United States
- Media type: Print (hardback & paperback) and audio CD
- Pages: 384 pp (first edition, hardcover)
- ISBN: 978-1-59448-950-1 (first edition, hardcover)
- OCLC: 85783363
- Dewey Decimal: 813/.6 22
- LC Class: PS3608.O832 T56 2007

A Thousand Splendid Suns is a 2007 novel by Afghan-American author Khaled Hosseini, following the huge success of his bestselling 2003 debut The Kite Runner. Mariam, an illegitimate teenager from Herat, is forced to marry a shoemaker from Kabul after a family tragedy. Laila, born a generation later, lives a relatively privileged life, but her life intersects with Mariam's when a similar tragedy forces her to accept a marriage proposal from Mariam's husband.

Hosseini has remarked that he regards the novel as a "mother-daughter story" in contrast to The Kite Runner, which he considers a "father-son story". It continues some of the themes used in his previous work, such as familial dynamics, but instead focusing primarily on female characters and their roles in contemporary Afghan society.

A Thousand Splendid Suns was released on May 22, 2007, and received favorable widespread critical acclaim from Kirkus Reviews, Publishers Weekly, Library Journal, and Booklist, and became a number one New York Times Best Seller for fifteen weeks following its release. During its first week on sale, it sold over one million copies. Columbia Pictures purchased film rights in 2007, and a theatrical adaptation of the book premiered on February 1, 2017, at the American Conservatory Theater in San Francisco, California.

== Creation ==
=== Title ===
The title of the book comes from a line in Josephine Davis' translation of the poem "Kabul", by the 17th-century Iranian poet Saib Tabrizi:

"Every street of Kabul is enthralling to the eye
Through the bazaars, caravans of Egypt pass
One could not count the moons that shimmer on her roofs
And the thousand splendid suns that hide behind her walls"

Hosseini explained "I was searching for English translations of poems about Kabul, for use in a scene where a character bemoans leaving his beloved city, when I found this particular verse. I realized that I had found not only the right line for the scene, but also an evocative title in the phrase 'a thousand splendid suns,' which appears in the next-to-last stanza."

=== Inspiration ===
When asked what led him to write a novel centered on two Afghan women, Hosseini responded:

"I had been entertaining the idea of writing a story of Afghan women for some time after I'd finished writing The Kite Runner. That first novel was a male-dominated story. All the major characters, except perhaps for Amir's wife Soraya, were men. There was a whole facet of Afghan society which I hadn't touched on in The Kite Runner, an entire landscape that I felt was fertile with story ideas...In the spring of 2003, I went to Kabul, and I recall seeing these burqa-clad women sitting at street corners, with four, five, six children, begging for change. I remember watching them walking in pairs up the street, trailed by their children in ragged clothes, and wondering how life had brought them to that point...I spoke to many of those women in Kabul. Their life stories were truly heartbreaking...When I began writing A Thousand Splendid Suns, I found myself thinking about those resilient women over and over. Though no one woman that I met in Kabul inspired either Laila or Mariam, their voices, faces, and their incredible stories of survival were always with me, and a good part of my inspiration for this novel came from their collective spirit."

=== Writing ===
"I hope the book offers emotional subtext to the image of the burqa-clad woman walking down a dusty street in Kabul."

— Khaled Hosseini in a 2007 interview.

Hosseini disclosed that in some ways, A Thousand Splendid Suns was more difficult to write than his first novel, The Kite Runner. He noted the anticipation for his second book when writing it, compared to The Kite Runner wherein "no one was waiting for it." He also found his second novel to be more "ambitious" than the first due to its larger cast of characters; its dual focus on Mariam and Laila; and its covering a multi-generational period of nearly forty-five years in total. However, he found the novel easier to write once he had begun, noting "as I began to write, as the story picked up the pace and I found myself immersed in the world of Mariam and Laila, these apprehensions vanished on their own. The developing story captured me and enabled me to tune out the background noise and get on with the business of inhabiting the world I was creating." The characters "took on a life of their own" at this point and "became very real for [him]".

Similar to The Kite Runner, the manuscript had to be extensively revised; with Hosseini ultimately rewriting the book five times before it was complete. The novel's anticipated release was first announced in October 2006, when it was described as a story about "family, friendship, faith and the salvation to be found in love".

== Plot ==
On the outskirts of Herat, Mariam lives with her embittered mother, Nana, in a secluded hut. Born as the result of an affair between her mother and Jalil, a wealthy local businessman, Mariam and her mother live outside the city to avoid embarrassing Jalil's legitimate family. Nana resents Jalil for his duplicitous kindness towards Mariam, whom he visits every Thursday. On Mariam’s fifteenth birthday, Jalil does not show up to take her to see Pinocchio in town as promised. Against Nana’s wishes, Mariam travels into the city to find her father, and sleeps outside his house when told he is away, later discovering he was home the entire time. Heartbroken, she returns home to find that Nana has committed suicide by hanging. At the behest of Jalil’s family, Mariam is rushed into marriage with Rasheed, a widowed shoemaker from Kabul thirty years her senior, and moves to Kabul. Rasheed is initially courteous to Mariam, but over the course of seven miscarriages becomes increasingly abusive, angered by her inability to provide him a son. Years later, an ailing Jalil attempts to visit Mariam, but she refuses to allow him inside.

Meanwhile, Mariam's young neighbor Laila grows up close to her schoolteacher father and worries for her mother, who is deeply depressed following the death of her two sons fighting for the Mujahideen against the Soviets. Laila is close friends with Tariq, a local Pashtun boy, and romance develops between them as they grow up. When Laila is fourteen, civil war breaks out in Afghanistan between factions of the Mujahideen, and Kabul is bombarded by frequent rocket attacks. Tariq's family decide to leave the city, and while saying their goodbyes, he and Laila have sex in a moment of passion. Shortly after, a rocket hits Laila’s home as they prepare to flee, killing her parents. Taken in by Mariam and Rasheed, Laila recovers from her injuries, while Rasheed begins courting her, to Mariam's dismay. A man arrives at Rasheed's home to inform Laila that Tariq and his family died in a bomb blast on their way to Pakistan. Realizing that she is pregnant with Tariq's child, Laila agrees to marry Rasheed, convincing Rasheed that the child is his. She gives birth to a daughter, whom she names Aziza.

The childless Mariam initially treats Laila coldly, avoiding contact with her and Aziza, but they eventually become friends, forming a close mother-daughter-like bond and supporting each other in enduring Rasheed's abuse. They attempt to flee one day, but are caught by the local police and severely beaten and starved by Rasheed as punishment. Meanwhile, the Taliban rise to power in Kabul and impose harsh rules on the local population, severely curtailing women's rights. Laila is forced to give birth to a son, Zalmai, via caesarian section without anaesthesia in a deprived women’s hospital. Laila and Mariam struggle with raising Zalmai, whom Rasheed dotes on and favors over Aziza. During a drought, Rasheed's workshop burns down, and he is forced to take other jobs, worsening his mood and abuse. As food supplies run low, Rasheed forces Laila to send Aziza to an orphanage and refuses to accompany her to visit, causing Laila to endure beatings from the Taliban for traveling alone.

One day, Tariq suddenly shows up on Laila's doorstep, much to her shock. Laila realizes that Rasheed had paid the man to lie to her about Tariq's death, so that she would stay in Kabul and marry him. Laila and Mariam plan to escape again, this time with Tariq's help. However, when Rasheed returns home from work, Zalmai informs his father Rasheed that Laila had a male visitor. Enraged, Rasheed begins viciously beating the women and attempts to strangle Laila. To save Laila, Mariam kills Rasheed with a shovel. Knowing the Taliban would be after them, Mariam decides to turn herself in to draw attention away from Laila and Tariq's escape with the children. Confessing the murder to the Taliban, Mariam is sentenced to public execution. She complies peacefully, having found unexpected happiness and love in her years with Laila and the children.

Laila and Tariq successfully escape Afghanistan with the children and move east to Murree in the Pakistani Punjab, where they marry. After the fall of the Taliban, they return to Kabul to join the rebuilding of Afghan society. They stop en route to Herat, where Laila meets with the son of a kindly mullah from Mariam’s childhood, who gives her a box Jalil had left for Mariam. Inside, she finds a videotape of Pinocchio, a sack of money, and a letter in which Jalil expresses his regret and love for Mariam, wishing he had fought for her and raised her as his child. The family return to Kabul and uses the money to repair the orphanage Aziza once stayed in, and Laila works there as a teacher. She becomes pregnant with her third child, whom she intends to name Mariam if it is a girl.

== Analysis ==
=== Family ===
When asked about common themes in The Kite Runner and A Thousand Splendid Suns, Hosseini replied:

"Both novels are multigenerational, and so the relationship between parent and child, with all of its manifest complexities and contradictions, is a prominent theme. I did not intend this, but I am keenly interested, it appears, in the way parents and children love, disappoint, and in the end honor each other. In one way, the two novels are corollaries: The Kite Runner was a father-son story, and A Thousand Splendid Suns can be seen as a mother-daughter story."

He considers both novels to be "love stories" in the sense love "draws characters out of their isolation, that gives them the strength to transcend their own limitations, to expose their vulnerabilities, and to perform devastating acts of self-sacrifice".

=== Women in Afghanistan ===
Hosseini visited Afghanistan in 2003, and "heard so many stories about what happened to women, the tragedies that they had endured, the difficulties, the gender-based violence that they had suffered, the discrimination, the being barred from active life during the Taliban, having their movement restricted, being banned essentially from practicing their legal, social rights, political rights". This motivated him to write a novel centered on two Afghan women.

The Washington Post critic Jonathan Yardley suggested that "the central theme of A Thousand Splendid Suns is the place of women in Afghan society", pointing to a passage in which Mariam's mother states, "learn this now and learn it well, my daughter: like a compass needle that points north, a man's accusing finger always finds a woman. Always. You remember that, Mariam."

In the book, both Mariam and Laila are forced into accepting marriage to Rasheed, who requires them to wear a burqa long before it is implemented by law under the Taliban. He later becomes increasingly abusive. A Riverhead Trades Weekly review states that the novel consistently shows the "patriarchal despotism where women are agonizingly dependent on fathers, husbands and especially sons, the bearing of male children being their sole path to social status."

== Reception ==
In the first week following its release, A Thousand Splendid Suns sold over one million copies, becoming a number-one New York Times bestseller for fifteen weeks. Time magazine's Lev Grossman placed it at number three in the Top 10 Fiction Books of 2007, and praised it as a "dense, rich, pressure-packed guide to enduring the unendurable." Jonathan Yardley said in the Washington Post "Book World", "Just in case you're wondering whether Khaled Hosseini's A Thousand Splendid Suns is as good as The Kite Runner, here's the answer: No. It's better."

A Thousand Splendid Suns received significant praise from reviewers, with Publishers Weekly calling it "a powerful, harrowing depiction of Afghanistan" and USA Today describing the prose as "achingly beautiful".

Lisa See of The New York Times attributed the book's success to Hosseini "[understanding] the power of emotion as few other popular writers do". Natasha Walter from The Guardian wrote, "Hosseini is skilled at telling a certain kind of story, in which events that may seem unbearable—violence, misery and abuse—are made readable. He doesn't gloss over the horrors his characters live through, but something about his direct, explanatory style and the sense that you are moving towards a redemptive ending makes the whole narrative, for all its tragedies, slip down rather easily."

Cathleen Medwick gave the novel a highly positive review in O, the Oprah Magazine:

"Love may not be the first thing that comes to mind when you consider the war-ravaged landscape of Afghanistan. But that is the emotion—subterranean, powerful, beautiful, illicit, and infinitely patient—that suffuses the pages of Khaled Hosseini's A Thousand Splendid Suns. As in his best-selling first novel, The Kite Runner, Hosseini movingly examines the connections between unlikely friends, the fissures that open up between parents and children, the intransigence of quiet hearts."

The New York Times writer Michiko Kakutani wrote a more critical review, describing the opening as "heavy-handed" and early events in the novel as "soap-opera-ish". Despite these objections, she concluded, "Gradually, however, Mr. Hosseini's instinctive storytelling skills take over, mowing down the reader's objections through sheer momentum and will. He succeeds in making the emotional reality of Mariam and Laila's lives tangible to us, and by conjuring their day-to-day routines, he is able to give us a sense of what daily life was like in Kabul—both before and during the harsh reign of the Taliban." Similarly, Yvonne Zipp of The Christian Science Monitor concluded that A Thousand Splendid Suns was ultimately "a little shaky as a work of literature".

The depictions of the lead female characters, Mariam and Laila, were praised by several commentators. John Freeman from The Houston Chronicle found them "enormously winning" while Carol Memmott from USA Today further described them as "stunningly heroic characters whose spirits somehow grasp the dimmest rays of hope". Medwick summed up the portrayals: "Mariam, branded as a harami, or bastard, and forced into an abusive marriage at the age of fifteen, and Laila, a beauty groomed for success but shrouded almost beyond recognition by repressive sharia law and the husband she and Mariam share. The story, epic in scope and spanning three decades, follows these two indomitable women whose fortunes mirror those of their beloved and battered country—'nothing pretty to look at, but still standing'—and who find in each other the strength they need to survive."

Jennifer Reese from Entertainment Weekly dubbed Rasheed "one of the most repulsive males in recent literature". Lisa See wrote that, with the exception of Tariq, "the male characters seem either unrelentingly evil or pathetically weak" and opined, "If a woman wrote these things about her male characters, she would probably be labeled a man-hater."

On November 5, 2019, the BBC News listed A Thousand Splendid Suns on its list of the 100 most inspiring novels.

== Challenges ==
Censorship
When	Where	Outcome	Notes	References
2020	Henderson County, North Carolina	Retained	Some residents of the county called for a ban, were unsuccessful	

== Adaptations ==
Columbia Pictures owns the movie rights to the novel. Steven Zaillian finished writing the first draft of the screenplay in 2009 and was also slated to direct; Scott Rudin had signed on as a producer. In May 2013, studios confirmed a tentative release date of 2015, although as of 2025 the film remains unproduced.

The first theatrical adaptation of the novel premiered in San Francisco, California, on February 1, 2017. It is co-produced by the American Conservatory Theater and Theatre Calgary. The theatrical adaptation condenses the novel for length, beginning with the deaths of Hakim and Fariba and telling earlier sections (such as Mariam's childhood and Laila and Tariq's romance) through flashbacks.

A television limited series adaptation of the novel is in works by One Community.

An opera adaptation of the novel, composed by Sheila Silver, was commissioned by Seattle Opera and premiered on February 25, 2023.
