= Khaled Hosseini =

Afghan-American novelist (born 1965)

- خالد حسینی
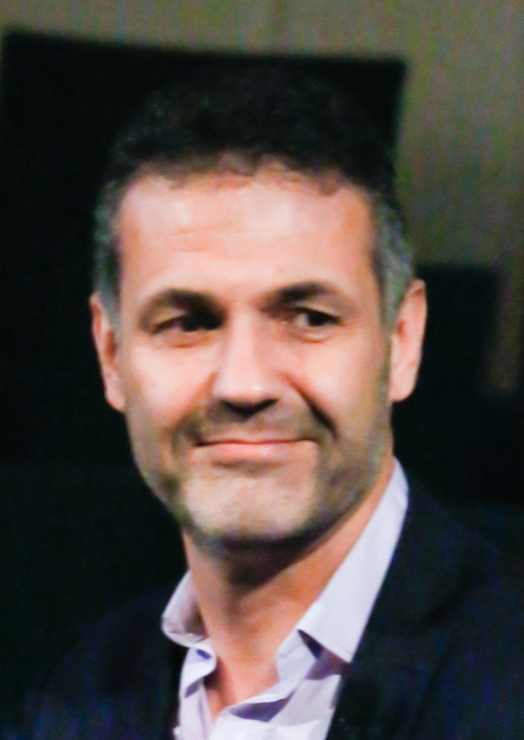
- Hosseini in 2013
- Born: March 4, 1965 (age 61); Kabul, Afghanistan
- Citizenship: United States
- Education: Santa Clara University (BS); University of California, San Diego (MD)
- Occupations: Novelist, physician
- Spouse: Roya Hosseini
- Writing career
- Period: 2003–present (as an author)
- Genre: Fiction
- Notable works: The Kite Runner; A Thousand Splendid Suns
- Khaled Hosseini's voice Recorded February 2014 from the BBC Radio 4 programme Bookclub
- Website: www.khaledhosseini.com

Khaled Hosseini or Khalid Husseini (/ˈhɑːlɛd hoʊˈseɪni/; Pashto/Dari: خالد حسینی, Dari: [ˈxɑːlɪd hʊˈsæjniː]; born March 4, 1965) is an Afghan and American novelist, UNHCR goodwill ambassador, and former physician. His debut novel The Kite Runner (2003) was a critical and commercial success; the book and his subsequent novels have all been at least partially set in Afghanistan and have featured an Afghan as the protagonist. Hosseini's novels have spread awareness about Afghanistan's people and culture.

Hosseini was briefly a resident of Iran and France after being born in Kabul, Afghanistan, to a diplomat father. When Hosseini was 15, his family applied for asylum in the United States, where he later became a naturalized citizen. Hosseini did not return to Afghanistan until 2003 when he was 38, an experience similar to that of the protagonist in The Kite Runner. In later interviews, Hosseini acknowledged that he suffered from survivor's guilt for having been able to leave the country prior to the Soviet invasion and subsequent wars.

After graduating from college, Hosseini worked as a physician in California, a situation he likened to "an arranged marriage". The success of The Kite Runner meant he was able to retire from medicine in order to write full-time. His three novels have all reached various levels of critical and commercial success. The Kite Runner spent 101 weeks on The New York Times Best Seller list, including three weeks at number one. His second novel, A Thousand Splendid Suns (2007), spent 103 weeks on the chart, including 15 at number one while his third novel, And the Mountains Echoed (2013), remained on the chart for 33 weeks. In addition to writing, Hosseini has advocated for the support of refugees, including establishing with the UNHCR the Khaled Hosseini Foundation to support Afghan refugees returning to Afghanistan.

== Early life and education ==
=== Early life ===
Hosseini was born on March 4, 1965, in Kabul, Afghanistan, the eldest of five children. His father, Nasser, worked as a diplomat for the Ministry of Foreign Affairs in Kabul while his mother worked as a Persian language teacher at a girls' high school; both originate from Herat. Regarding his ethnicity, Hosseini stated, "I'm not pure anything. There's a Pashtun part of me, a Tajik part of me." His mother's family is believed to be from the Mohammadzai tribe of Pashtuns. Hosseini describes his upbringing as privileged. He spent eight years of his childhood in the upper class Wazir Akbar Khan neighborhood in Kabul. Hosseini does not recall his sister, Raya, ever suffering discrimination for being a female, and he remembers Kabul as "a growing, thriving, cosmopolitan city", where he regularly flew kites with his cousins.

In 1970, Hosseini and his family moved to Iran where his father worked for the Embassy of Afghanistan in Tehran. In 1973, Hosseini's family returned to Kabul, and Hosseini's youngest brother was born in July of that year. In 1976, when Hosseini was 11 years old, his father secured a job in Paris, France, and moved the family there. They were unable to return to Afghanistan because of the April 1978 Saur Revolution in which the People's Democratic Party of Afghanistan (PDPA) seized power. In 1980, shortly after the start of the Soviet–Afghan War, they sought political asylum in the United States and made their residence in San Jose, California. When Hosseini initially came to the United States, he was fifteen years old and could not speak English. He describes the experience as "a culture shock" and "very alienating".

Despite their distance from the country's turmoil, the family was aware of the situations faced by a number of their friends and relatives. Hosseini explained:

We had a lot of family and friends in Kabul. And the communist coup, as opposed to the coup that happened in '73, was actually very violent. A lot of people rounded up and executed, a lot of people were imprisoned. Virtually anybody [who] was affiliated or associated with the previous regime or the royal family was persecuted, imprisoned, killed, rounded up, or disappeared. And so we would hear news of friends and acquaintances and occasionally family members to whom that had happened, [who] were either in prison or worse, had just disappeared and nobody knew where they were, and some of them never turned up. My wife's uncle was a very famous singer and composer in Kabul who had been quite vocal about his dislike for the communists and so on, and he disappeared. And to this day, we have no idea what happened to him. So that sort of thing, we began to hear news over in Europe of mass executions and really just horror stories. So it was surreal, and it also really kind of hit home in a very real way.

=== Education and medical career ===
Hosseini graduated from Independence High School in San Jose in 1984 and enrolled at Santa Clara University, where he graduated with a bachelor's degree in biology in 1988. The following year, he enrolled in the University of California, San Diego School of Medicine, where he graduated with his M.D. in 1993. In 1997, he finished his internal medicine residency at Los Angeles' Cedars-Sinai Medical Centre. Up to a year and a half after The Kite Runner’s publication, he spent more than ten years practicing medicine.

== Career ==
=== Novels ===
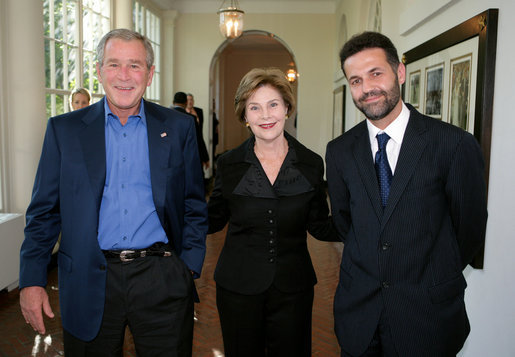
Hosseini with President George W Bush and First lady Laura Bush

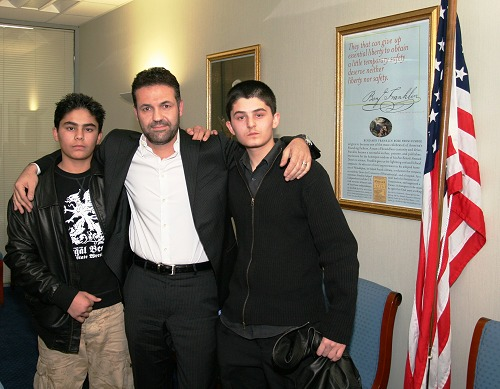
Khaled Hosseini with actors from The Kite Runner, Bahram and Elham Ehsas

In 2003, Hosseini published his first novel, The Kite Runner, the story of a young boy, Amir, struggling to form a deeper connection with his father and coping with memories of a traumatic childhood event. The novel is set in Afghanistan, from the fall of the monarchy until the collapse of the Taliban regime, as well as in the San Francisco Bay Area, specifically in Fremont, California. The novel was the best selling novel of 2005 in the United States, according to Nielsen BookScan. The author read the audio version of The Kite Runner as well. The Kite Runner has been adapted into a film of the same name released in December 2007. Hosseini made a cameo appearance towards the end of the movie as a bystander, when Amir purchases a kite which he, then, flies with Sohrab.

Afghanistan is the setting for Hosseini's second book, A Thousand Splendid Suns, which was released in 2007. The story addresses many of the same issues as Hosseini's first book, but from a female perspective. It tells the tale of two women, Mariam and Laila, whose lives become intertwined after Mariam's husband marries Laila. The story is set during Afghanistan's tumultuous thirty-year transition from Soviet occupation to Taliban control and post-Taliban rebuilding. The novel was released by Riverhead Books on May 22, 2007, at the same time as the Simon & Schuster audiobook. The adaptation rights of the novel were subsequently acquired by producer Scott Rudin and Columbia Pictures.

Hosseini's third novel And the Mountains Echoed was released on May 21, 2013. Prior to its release, Hosseini said:

I am forever drawn to family as a recurring central theme of my writing. My earlier novels were at heart tales of fatherhood and motherhood. My new novel is a multi-generational family story as well, this time revolving around brothers and sisters, and the ways in which they love, wound, betray, honor, and sacrifice for each other."

=== UNHCR ===
Hosseini is currently a Goodwill Envoy for the United Nations High Commissioner for Refugees (UNHCR). He has been working with the Khaled Hosseini Foundation to deliver humanitarian aid in Afghanistan. The concept for the foundation was inspired by the trip to Afghanistan that Hosseini made in 2007 with UNHCR, with the organisation raising funds to build homes for refugees returning to Afghanistan.

Sea Prayer, an illustrated short story by Hosseini that was released in 2018, was motivated by the drowning of three-year-old Alan Kurdi, a refugee who was trying to get to Europe from Syria. Proceeds from sales went to the UNHCR and the Khaled Hosseini Foundation.

== Influences ==
As a child, Hosseini read a lot of Persian poetry, especially the works of poets such as Rumi, Omar Khayyám, Abdul-Qādir Bēdil, and Hafez. He has also cited a Persian translation of Jack London's White Fang as a key influence from his youth, in addition to translations of novels including Alice in Wonderland and Mickey Spillane's Mike Hammer series. He has cited Afghan singer Ahmad Zahir as a key musical influence, choosing the songs "Madar" and "Aye Padesha Khuban" as his two Inheritance Tracks during an appearance on BBC Radio 4's Saturday Live, and naming Zahir as "the Afghan Elvis" and stating his music was "one of the seminal memories of my time in Afghanistan".

== Personal life ==
Hosseini is married to Roya, and they have two children. They live in San Jose, California.He is fluent in Persian and Pashto, and has described himself as a secular Muslim. In July 2022, Hosseini announced via social media that his 21-year-old daughter had come out as transgender.

== Published works ==
- The Kite Runner (2003)
- A Thousand Splendid Suns (2007)
- And the Mountains Echoed (2013)
- Sea Prayer (2018)

== Awards and honors ==
In 2008, Hosseini received the Golden Plate Award of the American Academy of Achievement.

In 2014, Hosseini received the John Steinbeck Award from the Martha Heasley Cox Center for Steinbeck Studies at San Jose State University.

Awards for Hosseini's writing
Year	Work	Award	Result	Ref.
2004	The Kite Runner	Exclusive Books Boeke Prize	Winner	
2007	A Thousand Splendid Suns	California Book Award for Fiction	Silver Medal	
2008	A Thousand Splendid Suns	British Book Award for Richard & Judy Best Read of the Year	Winner	
2008	A Thousand Splendid Suns	Book Sense Book of the Year Award for Adult Fiction	Winner	
2013	And the Mountains Echoed	Goodreads Choice Award for Fiction	Winner	
2015	And the Mountains Echoed	DSC Prize for South Asian Literature	Longlist	

== See also ==
- List of best-selling fiction authors
