= Assailant (film) =

American film by Tom Paton

- Theatrical release poster
- Directed by: Tom Paton
- Written by: Tom Paton
- Produced by: Alan Latham; Philippe Martinez
- Starring: Poppy Delevingne; Casper Van Dien; Jeff Fahey; Chad Michael Collins
- Production companies: MSR Media; Highfield Grange Studios; Sherborne Media Capital
- Distributed by: Redbox Entertainment
- Release date: March 22, 2022
- Running time: 97 minutes
- Countries: United States; United Kingdom
- Language: English

Assailant is a 2022 thriller film written and directed by Tom Paton. It stars Poppy Delevingne, Chad Michael Collins, Casper Van Dien, and Jeff Fahey. The film was released by Redbox Entertainment on March 22, 2022.

== Premise ==
A couple going through marriage counseling decides to head to the Caribbean on a "make or break" sailing holiday. When the husband gets into a local bar fight the night before a difficult trek over a coastal trail, the duo finds themselves relentlessly chased by the aggressor and forced to work together in order to survive.

== Cast ==
- Poppy Delevingne as Zoe
- Chad Michael Collins as Jason
- Casper Van Dien as Michael
- Jeff Fahey as Henry
- Jennifer Wenger as Danielle
- Niki Spiridakos as Erin
- Sharon Mahlangu as Hostess
- Danielle Browne as Bar Maid
- Jacob Katsman as Ranger
- Spencer Collings as Dean

== Production ==
Principal photography for Assailant began on April 15, 2021, in Saint Kitts and Nevis. On May 7, the project was officially announced, when it was reported that Poppy Delevingne, Chad Michael Collins, Casper Van Dien, and Jeff Fahey would star. Filming was scheduled to conclude on May 16, 2021. Following One Year Off, the feature is the second of six films to be shot in Saint Kitts and Nevis under a deal between the production company MSR Media and the Nevis Island Administration. In July 2021, a first-look clip was released. In November 2021, Redbox Entertainment acquired the U.S. distribution rights to the film for a 2022 release.
