= Gregg Kaplan =

American business executive

- Education: University of Michigan; Harvard Business School
- Occupation: Business executive
- Known for: Founder and former Chief Executive Officer of Redbox

Gregg Kaplan is an American business executive.

He is the founder and former Chief Executive Officer of Redbox, the founder of Modjule LLC, and the former president and COO of Coinstar. He has also worked for McDonald's Corporation, Streamline.com, and is now an Operating Partner with Pritzker Group Private Capital.

== Early life ==
Kaplan graduated from the University of Michigan with a BA in Philosophy, and is also an alumnus of Pi Kappa Phi fraternity. He later earned an MBA from Harvard Business School.

== Business career ==
Kaplan began his career as an investment banker in New York City after his graduation from the University of Michigan, and worked in the industry for three years at Furman Selz. After his MBA, he worked for Streamline.com as Director of Interactive Marketing between 1996 and 1999.

From 1999 to 2001, he was then a partner at Divine interVentures. Kaplan then joined McDonald's as a strategy and development executive, and it is while he was at McDonald's that Kaplan founded Redbox.

In 2002, Kaplan started Redbox, testing a variety of different product kiosks, including DVD rental, in a handful of McDonald's restaurants and other miscellaneous locations in Washington DC. In 2003 he shut down all the other kiosk tests and focused redbox exclusively on DVD rentals. Kaplan ran the company from its infancy as an incubated enterprise at McDonald's, and served as the company's CEO beginning in 2005 when it became a separate entity after Coinstar invested $32 million to own 47% of the enterprise. He held the CEO position until 2009, when Coinstar acquired the remaining equity in Redbox from McDonald's and from the Redbox employees. In this time the company grew from a small number of kiosks to 14,000. Kaplan then served as the president and COO of Coinstar, the parent company of Redbox, after the acquisition of Redbox He served in this position until 2013, over which time the Coinstar and Redbox businesses increased from $1 billion to $2.2 billion in revenue. During that time, Redbox grew to 42,000 kiosk locations.

Following his time at Coinstar, he co-founded Modjule LLC, a private investment firm focused on kiosks and small footprint retail. He also sat on the boards of Chicagoland Entrepreneurial Center, Enova, In Context Solutions, and Network for Teaching Entrepreneurship. In 2015 Kaplan became a partner with Pritzker Group Private Capital, serving as Operating Partner of the firm's Services team.

He took over as CEO of Dentologie in June 2022.

== Personal life ==
In 2009 Kaplan was named one of Crain's Chicago Business's "40 under 40”. He lost his first wife, Felicia Kaplan, to breast cancer in 2012, and remarried in 2015 to Lindsay Avner, founder and CEO of Bright Pink, a breast and ovarian cancer non-profit In 2016, Kaplan and Avner launched the website ExploreYourGenetics.org, to help educate women about the use of genetic testing to prevent breast and ovarian cancer.
