= Ray Fearon =

British actor

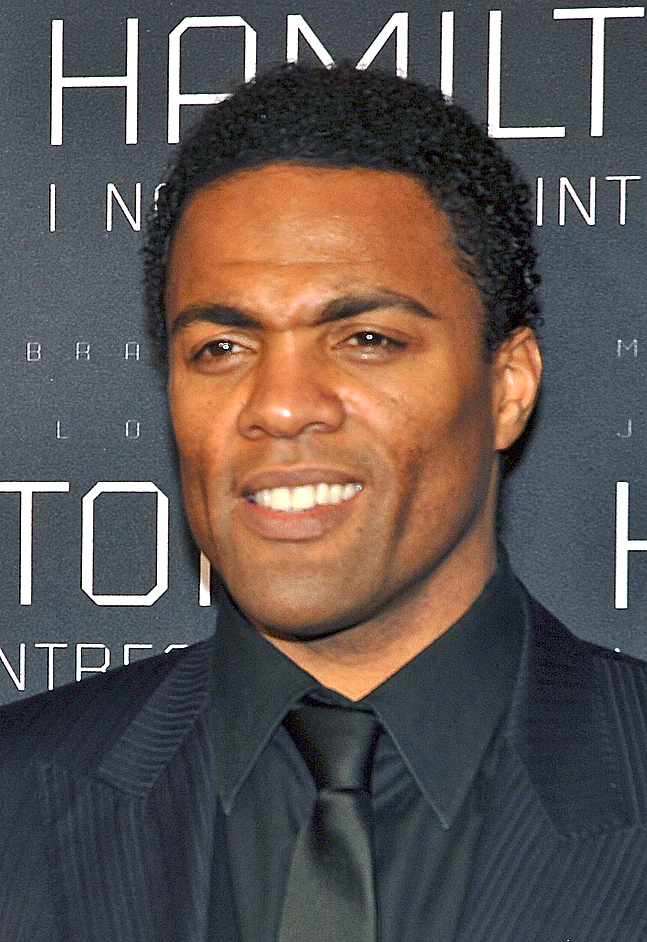
- Fearon in 2012
- Education: Rose Bruford College
- Occupation: Actor
- Years active: 1994–present
- Children: 3+

Raymond Fearon is a British actor. He played garage mechanic Nathan Cooper on ITV's long-running soap opera Coronation Street from 2005-2006. Other credits include Band of Gold (1997), EastEnders (2001), As If (2002), the Harry Potter film series (2001-2002), His Dark Materials (2003), Doctors (2008), Raw (2010), Da Vinci's Demons (2014), Fantastic Beasts (film series) (2018-2022), Fleabag (2019), Red Dwarf (2020), Champion (2023), and The Feud (2025).

== Early life ==
Fearon was the youngest of ten children born to Jamaican parents living in northwest London. From a young age, he joined the Royal Court Theatre and Tricycle Youth Theatre, before going on to study drama at Rose Bruford College.

== Career ==
=== Theatre ===
Fearon made his reputation as a stage actor, working at Liverpool's Everyman Theatre; Manchester Contact Theatre; Manchester Royal Exchange; Oxford Playhouse; Barn Theatre, Kent; The Almeida; The Crucible, Sheffield; The Donmar Warehouse; The Royal Shakespeare Theatres in Stratford and the National Theatre. He starred in Othello—opposite Gillian Kearney's Desdemona— in Liverpool at the age of 24, becoming the first black actor to play Othello on RSC main stages for over 40 years. His other early stage roles included Charles Surface in The School for Scandal; Betty/Martin in Cloud 9 (play); Longaville in Love's Labour's Lost; Ferdinand in The Tempest; and Pete in Blues for Mister Charlie.

His early theatre work in London included Hugo/Frederick in Ring Round the Moon at the Lilian Baylis Theatre; the title role in The Invisible Man (his one-man show) at the Bridewell Theatre; and Pierre in Venice Preserv'd at the Almeida Theatre.

He has worked extensively with the Royal Shakespeare Company(RSC) in their Stratford and London theatres and on tour. He was the first black actor to play the title role in Othello in the main Royal Shakespeare theatre (director Michael Attenborough, 1999) giving a performance alongside Richard McCabe's strong and repressed Iago. They also played opposite one another in 1996's The White Devil (Gale Edwards, Swan theatre) where he played Brachiano and McCabe the villain Flamineo. Fearon was directed by Attenborough also as Romeo alongside Zoe Waites as Juliet in Romeo and Juliet (RSC, Swan Theatre, Stratford-upon-Avon, 1997). He played Macbeth in Iqbal Khan's 2016 production at the Globe, opposite Tara Fitzgerald.

Other RSC roles have included the First Knight and First Tempter in Murder in the Cathedral (Swan, 1993), Stubb in Moby Dick (musical) (TOP, 1993), the Prince of Morocco in The Merchant of Venice (RST, 1994), Paris in Troilus and Cressida (Ian Judge, RST, 1996), the Marquis of Posa in Don Carlos (play) (1999), Pericles in Adrian Noble's Pericles, Prince of Tyre (RST and Roundhouse, 2002) and Mark Antony in Julius Caesar (play) (2012).

In 2003, he played 'Oberon' in A Midsummer Night's Dream at Sheffield's Crucible Theatre. In 2004, he appeared in as Jean Kiyabe in World Music by Steve Waters at the Donmar Warehouse, and in the same year at the National Theatre as Mark in Sing Yer Heart Out for the Lads by Roy Williams.

In 2010, he starred as Walter Lee Younger in A Raisin in the Sun by Lorraine Hansberry, the production was directed by Michael Buffong at the Royal Exchange, Manchester.

In July 2013 he played Macduff opposite Kenneth Branagh (as Macbeth) and Alex Kingston (as Lady Macbeth) in Macbeth at Manchester International Festival.Manchester. His performance was broadcast to cinemas on 20 July as part of National Theatre Live.

In December 2017 he played Nathan Detroit in Guys and Dolls at the Royal Exchange, Manchester. The production was directed by Michael Buffong.

=== Radio ===
In the BBC's 2003 radio adaptation of His Dark Materials, Fearon appeared as the narrator and as the angel Balthamos.

=== Television and film ===
In 2001 he appeared in Harry Potter and the Philosopher's Stone (as Firenze the centaur). He had a minor role as a sentry in Kenneth Branagh's 1996 film version of Hamlet.

Fearon played Nathan Cooper in Coronation Street from 2005 to 2006. He was in the 2006 series of Strictly Come Dancing, partnered by Camilla Dallerup, and was voted out in week 6.

From 2013 to 2015, he appeared as a fictionalised version of historical figure Carlo de' Medici on the Starz series Da Vinci's Demons. In 2019, Fearon played the role of Hot Misogynist in season two of the acclaimed BBC Three comedy-drama Fleabag.

In 2023, he starred Beres Champion in the BBC television series Champion, about the Champion family's involvement in the black music scene of London.

== Filmography ==
=== Film ===
Year	Title	Role	Notes
1996	Hamlet	Francisco	
1999	The Clandestine Marriage	Brush	
2001	Harry Potter and the Philosopher's Stone	Firenze	Voice and vocal effects
2002	Harry Potter and the Chamber of Secrets	Fawkes	Vocal effects
2008	The Chef's Letter	The Sous Chef	Short film
2009	Lulu and Jimi	Jimi	
2011	Therapist	Bigger	Short film
2012	Hamilton: In the Interest of the Nation	Benjamin Lee	
2013	National Theatre Live	Macduff	Stage production of Macbeth
2014	The Hooligan Factory	Midnight	
2016	The Complete Walk: Troilus and Cressida	Hector	Short film
2017	The Yellow Birds	Colonel	
2017	Beauty and the Beast	Père Robert	
2017	The Foreigner	Commander Richard Bromley	
2017	Space for You	RF	Short film
2017	To Love and to Cherish	Wilson	Short film
2018	2036 Origin Unknown	Sterling Brooks	
2018	Fantastic Beasts: The Crimes of Grindelwald	Fawkes	Vocal cameo
2019	Lessons of the Hour	Frederick Douglass	
2020	Breach	Billy	Short film
2021	The Protégé	Duquet	
2021	Father Christmas Is Back	Felix	
2021	The Lady of Heaven	Abu Bakr	
2022	Memory	Gerald Nussbaum	
2022	Fantastic Beasts: The Secrets of Dumbledore	Fawkes	Vocal effects
2022	Christmas in the Caribbean	Gregory	
2022	Christmas in Paradise	Felix	Sequel to Father Christmas Is Back
2023	One Year Off	George Prince	
2023	Coffee Wars	Bernie	
2023	Barbie	Dan at the FBI	
2024	Swede Caroline	Lawrence	
2024	The People Before	Pete	
2025	My Fault: London	William Leister	
2025	Cleaner	DI Kahn	
2025	Tinsel Town	TBA	Post-production

=== Television ===
Year	Title	Role	Notes
1995	The Bill	Dean Barnet	Series 11; episode 79: "Skin Deep"
1995	Prime Suspect	Mark Whitehouse	Series 4; episode 3: "Scent of Darkness"
1995	Dressing for Breakfast	Steve	Series 1; episode 4: "Steve"
1996	The Merchant of Venice	Morocco	Television film
1997	Band of Gold	Paul	Episodes 3 & 4: "The Catch: Parts One & Two"
1997	The Bill	Foley Marsh	Series 13; episode 124: "Crimes of a Lesser Passion"
2000	A Christmas Carol	Jacob Marley	Television film
2001	EastEnders	Lennie	3 episodes
2002	Outside the Rules	Gary Rainford	(unknown episodes)
2002	The Bill	Paul Sharpe	Series 18; episode 32: "Ruffled Feathers"
2002	As If	Riggs	Series 2 & 3; 10 episodes
2003	Keen Eddie	Georgie Pendergast	Episode 7: "Black Like Me"
2003	Waking the Dead	Miles Patterson	Series 3; episodes 3 & 4: "Walking on Water: Parts 1 & 2"
2003	Doctors	PC Vernon Samuels	Series 5; episode 115: "Alpha Male"
2004	In Search of Shakespeare	Various characters	Mini-series; episodes 1–4
2005	Revelations	Benjamin	Mini-series; episode 3: "Hour Three"
2005−2006	Coronation Street	Nathan Cooper	Series regular; 99 episodes
2008	Doctors	Malcolm Tumelo	Series 10; 18 episodes
2009	Missing	Karl Hughes	Series 1; episode 2: "Young and Restless"
2010	Raw	Paul	Series 2; episodes 3–5
2010	Ein Sommer in Kapstadt	Gabriel Swart	Television film
2011	Planet of the Apemen: Battle for Earth	Kalay	Mini-series; episodes 1 & 2
2011	Morlocks	Tyrell	Television film
2011	Celebrity Mastermind	Himself - Contestant	Series 10; episode 4
2011	Beate Uhse	Jeff	Television film
2011	Death in Paradise	Curtis	Series 1; episode 7
2011–2012	Above Suspicion	DCI/Commander Sam Power	Series 3; episodes 1 & 2, & series 4; episode 1
2012	Silk	Roland Boyce QC	Series 2; episode 3: "In the Family Way"
2012	Julius Caesar	Mark Antony	Television film
2013	Moving On	Steve McCullock	Series 5; episode 1: "Fledgling"
2014–2015	Da Vinci's Demons	Carlo de' Medici	Series 2 & 3; 9 episodes
2015	Suspects	Gregor Forrester	Series 3; episode 3: "Safe from Harm"
2016	New Blood	David Kumalah	Episodes 6 & 7: "Case 3, Parts 1 & 2"
2017	Snatch	Father John	Series 1; episodes 5, 6 & 8
2018	Midsomer Murders	Carlton Scott	Series 20; episode 2: "Death of the Small Coppers"
2018	Origin	Omar Touré	Episode 2: "Lost on Both Sides"
2019	Silent Witness	DI Jasper Quint	Series 22; episodes 7 & 8: "Deathmaker: Parts 1 & 2"
2019	Shakespeare & Hathaway: Private Investigators	Major Tony Suffolk	Series 2; episode 2: "The Play's the Thing"
2019	Fleabag	Hot Misogynist	Series 2; episodes 2 & 5
2019	Plebs	Magnus	Series 5; episode 7: "The New Flat"
2019–2020	His Dark Materials	Mr. Hanway	Series 1; episodes 5 & 7; & series 2; episode 2
2020	Red Dwarf: The Promised Land	Rodon	Television special
2020	Semi-Detached	Mike Bottford	Episode 3
2021	The Girlfriend Experience	Paul	Season 3; episodes 1 & 3: "Mirrors" & "Deep Fake"
2021	Close to Me	Nick	Mini-series; episodes 2–6
2022	We Hunt Together	Ch. Supt. Lester Price	Series 2; episodes 3–5
2023	Champion	Beres Champion	Main cast; episodes 1–8
2024	Father Brown	Silas O'Hagen	Series 11; episode 9: "The Dead of Night"
2025	The Feud	Alan Spence	Episodes 1–6
2025	Not Going Out	John	Series 14; episode 1: "House Move"

=== Radio ===
Year	Title	Role	Notes
2003	His Dark Materials	The Angel, Balthamos (Narrator)	BBC Radio 4 dramatisation. All episodes
