= Christmas in the Caribbean =

- Directed by: Philippe Martinez
- Written by: Philippe Martinez; Nathalie Cox
- Produced by: Philippe Martinez; Alan Latham
- Starring: Elizabeth Hurley; Stephanie Beacham; Caroline Quentin; Nathalie Cox; Edoardo Costa; Downtown Julie Brown; Ray Fearon
- Cinematography: George Burt
- Edited by: Frederic Fournier
- Music by: Michael Richard Plowman
- Production company: MSR Media
- Release date: 5 December 2022
- Running time: 90 minutes
- Country: United Kingdom
- Language: English

Christmas in the Caribbean is a 2022 romantic comedy film directed by Philippe Martinez and written by Martinez and Nathalie Cox. It stars Elizabeth Hurley, Caroline Quentin, Nathalie Cox, Edoardo Costa and Stephanie Beacham and was released digitally and in cinemas on 5 December 2022.

== Synopsis ==
Rejected at the altar, Rachel (Hurley) and her two best friends (Quentin and Cox) turn what would have been her honeymoon into a holiday of a lifetime to a Caribbean island; whilst there, Rachel falls in love with Alessandro (Costa), however Alessandro's family have other ideas.

== Cast ==
- Elizabeth Hurley as Rachel
- Caroline Quentin as Amanda
- Nathalie Cox as Rebecca
- Edoardo Costa as Alessandro
- Downtown Julie Brown as Ellie
- Stephanie Beacham as Chloe
- Ray Fearon as Gregory
- Hadar Cats as Monica
- Rafael Martinez as Rafael
- Winston Crooke as Winston
- Danielle Browne as Tasha
- Vaughn Anslyn as Bastian
- Frank Corbie as Frank
- Nikeeva Elliott as Nikeeva
- Andrea Browne as Andrea
- Vishan David as David

== Production ==
The film was announced on 26 October 2021 with principal photography beginning later that week. The majority of scenes were filmed in the Kittitian Hill resort in Saint Kitts and Nevis. Christmas in the Caribbean was released on 5 December 2022.
