= CSTR =

CSTR may refer to:

- The Centre for Speech Technology Research at The University of Edinburgh
- Coinstar (NASDAQ ticker symbol)
- Computer Science Technical Report, particularly those from Bell Labs, often seminal
- Continuous stirred-tank reactor
