= Rana Ahmad (disambiguation) =

Rana Ahmad may refer to:

- Rana Ahmad alias Rana Ahmad Hamd (born 1985), female Saudi Arabian-born German author, atheist and women's rights activist
- Rana Maqbool Ahmad (1948–2023), male Pakistani politician
- Rana Riaz Ahmad, male Pakistani politician
- Rana Shahbaz Ahmad, male Pakistani politician
- Rana Iqbal Ahmad Khan (born before 1947), male Pakistani lawyer and former politician
- Rana Mashhood Ahmad Khan (born 1966), male Pakistani politician
- Rana Ijaz Ahmad Noon (born 1968), male Pakistani politician

== See also ==
- Ahmad
- Rana (name)
