= Spiridakos =

Spiridakos (Greek: Σπυριδάκος) is a Greek surname. Notable people with the surname include:

- Niki Spiridakos (born 1975), Canadian actress and model
- Tracy Spiridakos (born 1988), Canadian actress
