= Edoardo Costa =

Italian model

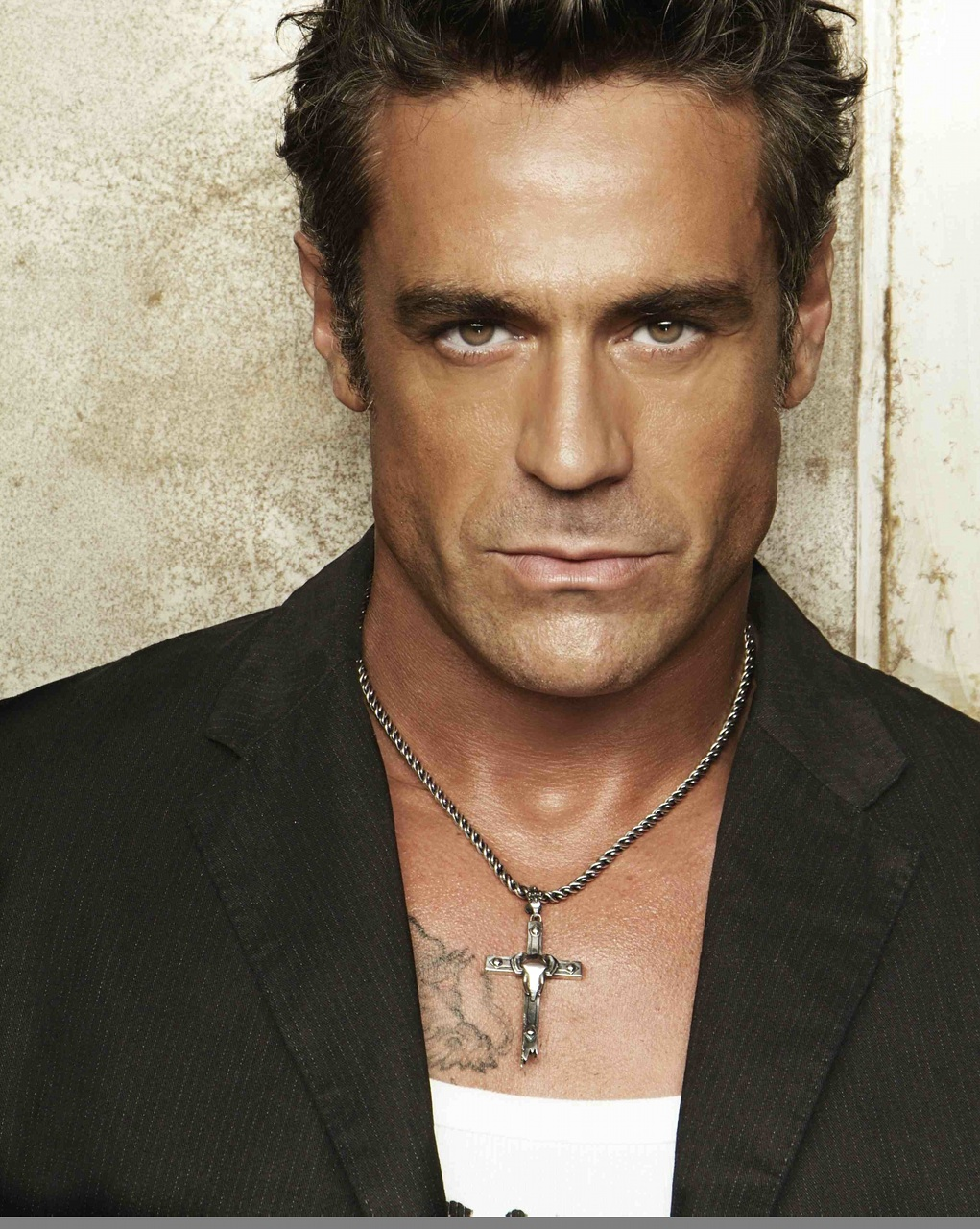
- Born: Edoardo Cicorini; 7 August 1967 (age 59); Varese, Italy
- Education: Università Cattolica del Sacro Cuore
- Occupations: Model, actor
- Website: edoardocosta.com

Edoardo Cicorini (born 7 August 1967), better known as Edoardo Costa, is an Italian fashion model and actor. His career began in the fashion industry in the early 1990s, when he worked for the modeling agency Why Not. While working as a model, Costa decided to begin studying acting in Paris, Milan, and Los Angeles. Following his studies, Costa went on to make various appearances on U.S. television. Some series included Baywatch, Arliss, and The Bold and the Beautiful.

Following his success on American television, Costa also made a variety of independent American films, which led him to play his debut major role as Thomas Gabriel's henchman, Emerson, in Live Free or Die Hard. His debut major role in an American film was Down the Shore in 2011. Costa has made forays into theater by acting in the plays Bread Love Fantasy and Very Old Man. Costa has worked on numerous Italian soap operas, television series, films, and reality shows throughout his career.

== Early life ==
Costa was born on 7 August 1967 in the town of Varese in Northern Italy, around 34 miles north of Milan. His father, Pietro, was a transport business owner, and his mother, Rosangela, worked at the local electric company. He had a younger sister, Monica. Costa was educated in Italy and attended Università Cattolica del Sacro Cuore, which is considered the largest Catholic University in the world. He studied Philosophy while at the University.

After completing his education, Costa served his military service as a Carabinieri in the mid-1980s. It was during this period in his life when he was discovered by a modelling scout in a local bar in Milan.

== Career ==
=== 1980s–2007: Early work ===
After being spotted by a modelling scout, Costa began to work for the modelling agency, Why Not. The modelling agency was founded in 1976 and has managed many famous models, including Naomi Campbell. Following his modelling career, Costa's first acting appearance came in 1988, when he featured in the film, Human Error.

After appearing in Human Error, Costa was featured in a number of US TV shows, including Baywatch, Arliss, and The Bold and the Beautiful. His appearances on American television coincided with various roles in Italian television series. This began in 1996, when he played the role of Lorenzo Macchia on the show Un posto al sole. Over the next decade, he spent a number of years working on various Italian TV shows.

His first role in a major film came in 2007, when he played the villain's henchman in Live Free or Die Hard.

In 2007, Costa took control of Beatrice International Models, which is considered within the fashion industry as a similar agency to Ford Models, Elite and Next with former models including Iman and Stephanie Seymour. The venture catapulted Costa into the international spotlight. The modeling agency also began a formal dialogue with the National Eating Disorders Association and its CEO, Dr. Lynne Grefe. The effort made it the first international modeling agency to work together with the association to spread awareness and positive prevention about the diseases that have plagued the industry for decades. In 2007, Costa also opened The Actor's Academy Milano. Inspired by his experience studying acting in America, Costa began one of the first schools in Europe to exclusively recruit Lifetime Members of the Actor's Studio—as well as teachers from other prestigious American acting schools including the Stella Adler Studio of Acting, the Beverly Hills Playhouse and the Lee Strasberg Theatre and Film Institute, all of whom specialized in method acting using the system created by Konstantin Stanislavski. The Actor's Academy Milano has hosted acclaimed actors such as Martin Landau and Mickey Rourke.

=== 2008–present ===
In 2008 and 2009, Striscia la notizia, a news program in Italy, raised concerns about the alleged embezzlement of funds of a non-profit organization founded by Costa for the benefit of children in Kenya and the inhabitants of the favelas of Rio de Janeiro, Brazil.

On 24 May 2011 Costa was charged with fraud by prosecutors in Milan, Italy. On 12 July 2012 Costa was sentenced to three years of prison, a fine of 2,000 Euros and 7,000 Euros. Costa denied the charges and later appealed against the original verdict.

In 2010, Costa had a major role as Colonel Tanelli in The Black Tulip. In the film he played the role of Colonel Tanelli. The film revolves around the Mansouri family, who open a restaurant in Kabul, Afghanistan. The film was selected for screening as Afghanistan's entry for the Best Foreign Language Film at the 83rd Academy Awards.

In 2013, he appeared in the film Non-Stop with Liam Neeson. In the film he played the role of Herve Philbert.

== Filmography ==
Year	Film / Television series	Role
1988	Human Error	Unknown
1996	Un posto al sole	Lorenzo Macchia
1998	Un medico in famiglia	Unknown
1999	Vivere	Riccardo Moretti
1999	Finalmente soli	Unknown
1999	Anni '60	Unknown
1999	Millennium Man	Marco Sanjoni
2000	Distretto di Polizia	Unknown
2000	Valeria medico legale	Unknown
2001	Una donna per amico 3	Unknown
2001	Hollow	Detective Santini
2001	Angelo il custode	Adriano
2003	The Bold and the Beautiful	Riccardo Moretti
2005	Il cielo può attendere	Unknown
2005	Ricomincio da me	Luca Biagini
2006	The Night Before the Exams	Ottavio – fidanzato della mamma di Claudia
2007	Live Free or Die Hard	Emerson
2010	Black Tulip	Colonel Tanelli
2011	Down the Shore	Jacques Sardi
2014	Non Stop	Herve Philbert
2014	Grand Street	Sebastian
2014	Panzehir	Francesco Sasso
2015	Cold	Thomas Blake
2015	CrAzy	Edoardo
2015	Club Santino	Marco
2017	Culture of Fear	David
2017	General Commander	Orsini
2019	My Sweet Life	Antonio
2022	Christmas in the Caribbean	Alessandro
2023	The Island	Manuel Alvarez
2025	Harry Wild	Marcello
