= Iqbal Khan =

Iqbal Khan may refer to:

- Iqbal Khan (general), Pakistani military officer
- Iqbal Khan (lawyer), Indo-Fijian lawyer
- Iqbal Ahmad Khan, Indian classical vocalist
- Iqbal Muhammad Ali Khan (born 1958), Pakistani politician
- Amir Iqbal Khan (born 1986), British boxer
- Malik Iqbal Mehdi Khan (1952–2016), Pakistani politician
- Iqbal Khan (actor) (born 1981), Indian television actor
- Mohammad Nafees Iqbal Khan (born 1985), Bangladeshi cricketer
- Rana Iqbal Ahmad Khan, Pakistani lawyer and politician
- Rana Muhammad Iqbal Khan, Pakistani politician
- Sania Iqbal Khan (born 1985), Pakistani cricketer
- Tamim Iqbal Khan (born 1989), Bangladeshi cricketer
- Suzad Iqbal Khan (born 1989), Indian film director
- Iqbal Khan (director), Pakistani-British theatre director
- Major Iqbal or Chaudhery Khan, a perpetrator of the 2008 Mumbai attacks
- Iqbal Khan, fictional magician in the 2013 Indian film Dhoom 3, played by Jackie Shroff
- Muhammad Iqbal Khan, Pakistani politician
- Mohammed Iqbal Khan Afridi, Pakistani politician

== See also ==
- Iqbal Hussain Khan Bandanawazi (1942–2010), Indian Sufi musician
- Iqbal Khan Jadoon (1931–1977), Pakistani politician
