= Nathalie Cox =

British actress, model (born 1978)

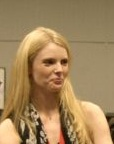
- Cox in 2007
- Born: Nathalie Claire Cox; 1 September 1978 (age 48); Leicestershire, England
- Occupations: Actress; model
- Years active: 2004–present
- Modelling information
- Height: 5 ft 10 1/2 in (179 cm)
- Hair colour: Blonde
- Eye colour: Blue
- Agencies: Nevs Model Agency; Modelwerk

Nathalie Claire Cox (born 1 September 1978) is a British actress and model. She is best known for her role as Juno Eclipse in the video game Star Wars: The Force Unleashed and its sequel, as well as her role in Ridley Scott's Kingdom of Heaven, and later her role as the player character's agent, Emma Jenkins, in the Codemasters' F1 games from F1 2016 to present.

== Nomination ==
Cox was nominated for the 2008 National Academy of Video Game Trade Reviewers (NAVGTR) Award for best supporting performance in a drama for Star Wars: The Force Unleashed.

== Filmography ==
=== Film ===
Year	Title	Role	Notes
2004	Remote	Sydney	Short film
2005	Kingdom of Heaven	Balian's Wife	
2005	Stoned	Girl in Disco	
2007	La Vie en rose	Pin-up	
2008	Jumper	English Beauty	
2008	How to Lose Friends & Alienate People	Woman in Bar	
2009	Exam	Blonde	
2010	Mr. Nice	Opium Girl	
2010	Clash of the Titans	Artemis	
2011	The Devil's Dosh	Lucy	Short film
2012	Saturday	Nat	Short film
2012	Shadow Boxer	Mervi	Short film
2013	The Double	Jack's Wife	
2013	One Day in Hell	Eve	Short film
2013	Scar Tissue	Tracey	
2014	Synoptica	Rachel	Short film
2016	Darkwave: Edge of the Storm	Sarah	Short film
2017	London Heist	Nicole	
2019	Redisplacement	Doctor Michelle	Short film
2019	The Good Neighbour	Woman In Black	
2020	My Dad’s Christmas Date	Laura	
2021	Father Christmas Is Back	Caroline Christmas	
2021	Miss Willoughby and the Haunted Bookshop	Miss Willoughby	
2022	Christmas In Paradise	Caroline Christmas	
2022	Christmas in the Caribbean	Rebecca	
2023	One Year Off	Claire Chambers	
2023	SOAP	Jennifer	Short film

=== Television ===
Year	Title	Role	Notes
2005	The Vicar of Dibley	Hetty	Episode: "Happy New Year"
2005	Waking the Dead	Jackie Holmes	Episode: "Cold Fusion"
2007	The Bill	Cindy Statham	Episode: "A Model Murder"
2008	Mutual Friends	Katie	Episode 1
2009	Kröd Mändoon and the Flaming Sword of Fire	Lilith	Episode: Succubi: "The Dawn's Early Light"
2009	Midsomer Murders	Tallis Filby	Episode: "The Creeper"
2010	The IT Crowd	Julia	Episode: "Italian for Beginners"
2011	Pete versus Life	Lottie Beaumont	Episode: "The Tennis Player"
2012	The Poison Tree	Jules Capel	Episode 1
2013	Pramface	Cally	Episode: "Stay at Home Losers"
2014	Waterloo Road	DI Murray	Episode: "A Tangled Web"
2014	Holby City	Helen Grainger	Episode: "Estel"
2015–2017	Doctors	Martha Bullmore / Tori Melville	2 Episodes
2017	Casualty	Becky Penton	Episode #32.5
2017	EastEnders	Duty Solicitor	Episode dated 26 December 2017

=== Videogames ===
Year	Title	Role	Notes
2008	Star Wars The Force Unleashed	Juno Eclipse	Voice and likeness
2008	Fracture	The Mega Bint	Voice
2010	Star Wars: The Force Unleashed II	Juno Eclipse	Voice and likeness
2013	Ryse: Son of Rome	Summer	Voice
2016	F1 2016	Emma Jenkins	As agent; voice and likeness
2017	F1 2017	Emma Jenkins	As agent; voice and likeness
2018	F1 2018	Emma Jenkins	As agent; voice and likeness
2019	F1 2019	Emma Jenkins	As agent; voice and likeness
2020	F1 2020	Emma Jenkins	Voice only
