= The Black Tulip (2010 film) =

2010 film

- Film poster
- Directed by: Sonia Nassery Cole
- Written by: Sonia Nassery Cole; David Michael O'Neill
- Produced by: Sonia Nassery Cole; Chris A. Cole; Evans Butterworth
- Starring: Haji Gul Aser; Sonia Nassery Cole; Walid Amini; Jack Scalia; Edoardo Costa
- Cinematography: Dave McFarland
- Music by: Christopher Young
- Release date: 23 September 2010
- Running time: 116 minutes
- Countries: Afghanistan; United States
- Languages: Dari; Pashto; English; Arabic; Italian

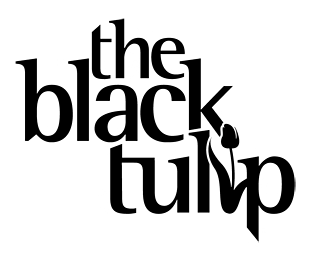
The Black Tulip logo designed by Matt Palmateer.

The Black Tulip is a 2010 film directed by filmmaker Sonia Nassery Cole and starring Cole, Haji Gul Aser, Walid Amini, Jack Scalia, and Edoardo Costa. It was set in Afghanistan.

== Premise ==
The film depicts the fictional Mansouri family who start a restaurant in Kabul named The Poets' Corner, where artists and writers meet. The story centers on Farishta (Cole), the woman who runs the cafe. The Poets' Corner serves wine in teapots and has poetry readings by locals and members of the U.S. military. This ultimately angers the Taliban and they begin kidnapping and assassinating the family and patrons of the cafe.

== Cast ==
- Sonia Nassery Cole as Farishta Mansouri
- Haji Gul Aser as Hadar Mansouri
- Walid Amini as Akram Zabuli
- Somaia Razaya as Belkis Mansouri
- Jack Scalia as Colonel Williams
- Edoardo Costa as Colonel Tanelli
- Samir Rassoly as Mustafa
- Hosna Tanha as Bobo Jan
- Sayed Rahim Sayeedi as Majuba
- Basir Mujaheed as Amanullah
- Shafi Sahel as Old Afghan Poet
- Payenda Joyenda as Gul
- Sadaf Yarmal as Satara Mansouri

== Dubious 'amputation' ==
According to Cole, a few weeks before the movie was to begin filming in Afghanistan, Taliban militants caught Zarifa Jahon, an actress Cole said she had wanted to cast in the film, and cut off her feet as punishment. Cole then cast herself in the lead role instead. When questioned about the lack of evidence about the event, Cole later claimed that the actress had told her in a telephone call about the amputations, and said that the woman asked her to leave her alone for her own safety. However, Latif Ahmadi, the head of the Afghan Film Organization, said he thought Cole's statement was "propaganda for the film" and he didn't believe it had happened. According to an article in The New York Times, many others in the film industry in Kabul had said they had never heard of such an actress nor of such an episode.

== Production ==
According to Cole, the film's cinematographer, a producer and a set designer had all abandoned her "in the middle of production." Michael Carney, the production designer, who had worked on the film in Afghanistan for two months, said he completed his agreed upon contract which had him leaving four days before the film completed shooting. "I could feel death," said Keith Smith, the original cinematographer. "I didn't sign up for that."

The film was largely financed by Cole.

== Reception ==
The film premiered 23 September 2010, at the Ariana Cinema Theater in Kabul, Afghanistan. There were advance screenings at the headquarters of the NATO-led International Security Assistance Force and at the embassy. Some Afghan attendees at the premiere challenged certain scenes in the film as not being faithful to Afghan culture or tradition.

The film was selected for screening as Afghanistan's entry for the Best Foreign Language Film at the 83rd Academy Awards but didn't make the January shortlist. Two songs featured in the film, "Forever One Love" and "Freedom Song", were also in contention for the Best Original Song Academy Award.

On the review aggregator Rotten Tomatoes, 25% of 12 critics' reviews are positive. Critics praised the film's "sense of place", but took issue with acting and "preachy dialogue."

== See also ==
- List of submissions to the 83rd Academy Awards for Best Foreign Language Film
- List of Afghan submissions for the Academy Award for Best Foreign Language Film
