= Redbox Automated Retail LLC v. Universal City Studios LLLP =

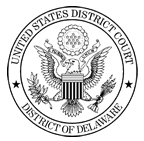
- Court: United States District Court for the District of Delaware
- Decided: August 17, 2009
- Docket nos.: 1:08-cv-00766
- Citation: 2009 WL 2588748

Holding
- The court dismissed Redbox's copyright misuse and tortious interference with contract claims, but allowed the antitrust count to move forward.

Court membership
- Judge sitting: Robert B. Kugler

Keywords
- First-sale doctrine, Sherman Antitrust Act, Tortious interference

Redbox Automated Retail LLC v. Universal City Studios LLLP, Dist. Court, D. Delaware 2009 was a case before Robert B. Kugler concerning copyright misuse, antitrust, and tortious interference with contract.

Redbox rented and sold DVDs through automated retail kiosks, and Universal Studios is a major movie studio. Redbox sued Universal on counts of copyright misuse, antitrust, and tortious interference with contract when Universal pressured Redbox to accept an agreement to only obtain titles from them after 45 days of initial DVD release. Universal pressured Redbox's distributors to stop providing titles to Redbox if Redbox did not accept this agreement. Universal did this to protect their profits, but since Redbox made a majority of their profits within two weeks of DVD release, Redbox did not accept.

The court dismissed Redbox's copyright misuse and tortious interference with contract claims but allowed the antitrust count to move forward.

== Background ==
Redbox was a company that rented and sold DVDs through over 35,900 automated retail kiosks inside chain restaurants, grocery stores, and drug stores in American cities. Universal Studios is a major movie studio that produced many of the titles that Redbox rented. Universal was concerned that DVD kiosks jeopardize their profits from DVD sales and rentals, so they pressured VPD and Ingram, two of Redbox's major film distributors, to stop distributing to Redbox unless Redbox signed a Revenue Sharing Agreement to only obtain DVDs directly from Universal and only after 45 days of initial DVD release. Since new release DVDs generated 30% of the total revenue for that particular title in Redbox's kiosks, Redbox did not sign the agreement as it would have damaged their profits.

As a result, Redbox claimed that they could no longer obtain titles through VPD and Ingram. They also claim that they could not obtain these titles through Walmart and Best Buy stores because the stores would either impose a limit on how many DVDs can be purchased at a time, or not sell to Redbox personnel entirely.

=== Legal action history ===
In October 2008, two months after the Revenue Sharing Agreement was proposed, Redbox began to raise claims against Universal Studios. In response, Universal motioned to dismiss some complaints. Redbox amended their previous complaint, added and omitted facts, and added more claims against Universal. Universal motioned in favor of their previous motion. The Court ordered mediation, but mediation fails. Eventually, the Amended Complaint sounded in six counts: (1) copyright misuse; (2) antitrust violations under the Quick Look Doctrine; (3) antitrust violations under the Rule of Reason doctrine; (4) antitrust violations amounting to restraint of trade; (5) antitrust violations under Section 1 of the Sherman Act; and (6) tortious interference with contract.

== Opinion of the Court ==
=== Copyright misuse ===
Redbox asserts that Universal staged a boycott of sales of Universal DVDs to Redbox, which violates the first sale doctrine of Section 109(a) of the Copyright Act. The Court dismissed this assertion, because the claim of copyright misuse is unavailable to Redbox and is impertinent to the dispute. The Court claimed that copyright misuse is a defense and not a claim, so Redbox cannot raise such a claim.

=== Antitrust ===
The Court ruled that Redbox sufficiently pleaded Universal violated Section 1 of the Sherman Antitrust Act. The Court stated that Universal had convinced others to boycott Redbox in distribution of Universal DVDs, which damaged Redbox's ability to compete in the DVD rental and sales market. The Court was convinced that Universal's actions were anti-competitive in nature, and thus violated the Sherman Antitrust Act.

=== Tortious interference with contract ===
The Court dismissed Redbox's claim that Universal tortiously interfered with Redbox's contracts with DVD distributors VPD and Ingram. This is because the contracts between Redbox and its suppliers did not explicitly state that the suppliers must provide Universal DVDs to Redbox. The contracts merely obligate Ingram to "order DVD software from the studios at the pricing negotiated by Redbox". Furthermore, Universal's contract with the distributors stated that "Distributor shall not sell to any account other than a retail account as verified by Universal." Therefore, restricting the distributor's sale of Universal DVDs was in Universal's right.

== Subsequent developments ==
On March 1, 2012, Redbox announced that it had agreed on a deal with Universal to offer DVDs 28 days after its initial release. This deal was good through August 2014.

Redbox had similar lawsuits and resolutions with other major film studios. Multimillion-dollar deals were signed with some studios that allowed Redbox to rent new release DVDs without delay, while deals with other studios have yet to be settled.

== See also ==
- First-sale doctrine
- Sherman Antitrust Act
- Tortious interference
