= Sonia Nassery Cole =

Afghan-American human rights activist (born 1965)

- Born: Sonia Nassery; December 1968 (age 57); Kabul, Afghanistan
- Occupations: Filmmaker author human rights activist
- Years active: 1994–present
- Spouse: Christoper H. Cole (divorced)
- Children: 1
- Website: www.sonianasserycole.com www.afghanistanworldfoundation.org

Sonia Nassery Cole (Dari: سونیا ناصری کول; born 1968) is an Afghan-born American human rights activist, filmmaker, and author.

== Early life ==
Sonia Nassery Cole was born in Kabul, Afghanistan, the daughter of an Afghan diplomat.. At fourteen, she fled Afghanistan amid the Soviet invasion of 1979 to seek refuge in the United States of America without her family.

At seventeen, she wrote a nine-page letter to President Ronald Reagan about the situation in her country and pleaded for help and sought to meet him.

== Humanitarian work in Afghanistan ==
Cole founded the Afghanistan World Foundation in 2002 and began making films. She was instrumental in raising funds used for various necessities in her native country such as the construction of a hospital for women and children in Kabul, medical care for landmine victims, and other causes. Cole focuses on efforts to improve the conditions for women and children in Afghanistan.

Sonia also befriended singer Natalie Cole while she was working with the Afghan World Foundation. She became a board member for the organization along Henry Kissinger, Prince Albert of Monaco, Anne Heche and Susan Sarandon.

== Film career ==
Cole has worked in film since 1994. In 2007, she directed the short film The Bread Winner. In 2010, her film The Black Tulip was selected as Afghanistan's official entry for the Best Foreign Language Film at the 83rd Academy Awards. The film won "best picture" awards in Boston Film Festival, Beverly Hills Film Festival, and the Salento Film Festival.

The film, which premiered at the Ariana Cinema Theater on September 23, 2010 and screened at the NATO base as well as an American Embassy, was distributed by SnagFilms, and is about a family in Kabul opening a restaurant business after the fall of the Taliban regime. The film received press in The New York Times, The New York Observer, NBC, and ABC.

Her film I Am You (2019) is an independent feature film based on the true story of three Afghan refugees.

== Author ==
In 2013, she received the Freedom to Write Award from PEN Center USA. She has a book, Will I Live Tomorrow?, released in October 2013.

== Personal life ==
She currently resides in New York City and Beverly Hills, California and is now divorced from Christopher H. Cole, but retains his surname. She has one son.

She is the recipient of a "Congressional Recognition" award on December 4, 2006, "Afghan American Sisterhood Award", and the "UN Women Together Award" on June 7, 2012. Cole is a member of the Jodi Solomon Speakers Bureau.
