= Father Christmas Is Back =

2021 film by Philippe Martinez and Mick Davis

- Official release poster
- Directed by: Philippe Martinez; Mick Davis
- Screenplay by: Hannah Davis Law; David Conolly; Dylanne Corcoran
- Story by: Philippe Martinez
- Produced by: Alan Latham; Philippe Martinez
- Starring: Elizabeth Hurley; Nathalie Cox; Talulah Riley; Kris Marshall; Caroline Quentin; April Bowlby; Ray Fearon; Naomi Frederick; John Cleese; Kelsey Grammer; Katy Brand; Amelie Prescott; Oliver Smith
- Cinematography: Ross W. Clarkson
- Edited by: Frederic Fournier
- Music by: Bruno Brugnano
- Production companies: MSR Media; Highfield Grange Studios; Goldfinch
- Distributed by: Netflix
- Release date: 7 November 2021
- Running time: 105 minutes
- Country: United Kingdom
- Language: English

Father Christmas Is Back is a 2021 British Christmas comedy film directed by Philippe Martinez and Mick Davis and starring Elizabeth Hurley, Nathalie Cox, John Cleese, and Kelsey Grammer. It was released on 7 November 2021 by Netflix. A sequel titled Christmas in Paradise was released in 2022.

== Plot ==
Four sisters – Caroline, Joanna, Paulina, and Vicky – reunite for Christmas in the Yorkshire mansion of Caroline and her husband Peter. Caroline is obsessed that everything be perfect, but things don't go to plan.

The tree crashes to the floor on the 22nd, so Peter and his children, Daisey and Henry, redecorate it with homemade ornaments. Caroline's youngest sister Vicky arrives first, followed by Joanna with her boyfriend Felix and their mum Elizabeth. Paulina arrives on foot as their Uncle John watches from afar.

As they gather by the tree, Joanna eyes it with disdain and is visibly unenthusiastic about her niece and nephew, forbidding them to touch any of her things, while wild-child Aunt Vicky happily opens her purse and hands out items she obtained on her recent couch-surfing trip around the United States.

After lounging by the fire awhile, the adults all move to the library, where Paulina is working on her thesis on the Fab Four (The Beatles), and Caroline shows them the holiday, completely mapped out. Joanna loses her temper at Vicky after she alludes to (Joanna's) greater age one too many times, so announces that she and Felix will stay in the town.

Before anyone leaves, the four sisters are in the kitchen and Vicky blurts out that she'd stayed with their estranged father James and his girlfriend Jackie in Florida for a couple of weeks. The other three are reeling from the shock of this news when their mother comes in.

Everyone is sitting by the fire again, in silence, when a car pulls up: Vicky had invited their father and Jackie to their Christmas celebration without telling anyone. After the men introduce themselves, and everyone has tea, the sisters slip out to talk. They criticize Jackie for her American accent and youth, as she's only 35. They turn their anger on Vicky and she gets fed up and blazes off in Felix's Rolls-Royce. Meanwhile, the viewer learns that Joanna is a fashion editor, so her lavish clothes are actually work perks. Vicky ends up at the village pub, where she seduces the bartender. Elizabeth also stays out all night, alone with John.

On the 24th the family goes to a fundraising event for the church. Vicky is selling Joanna's clothes at one of the stalls for very low prices and offers Felix's car as a prize, so Joanna and Felix must get their things back by participating in the event: she must buy her clothes back and he must continue spinning the wheel until he wins back his car.

At lunch, when John won't let James speak, they go outside to have it out; instead, James proposes to Jackie. Later he apologizes to his daughters for having left 27 years before, but explains that unbeknownst to them he paid for everything and their mother always kept him updated. They invite him to join him at the pub.

After a long afternoon of drinking, the group returns to Jackie's New-York-style surprise: a huge light display that inevitably blows out the old electrical circuits of the stately manor. While Peter distributes blankets in the dark, Joanna secretly sneaks in and out of Caroline's bathroom.

Peter finds a positive pregnancy test in their bathroom on Christmas Day. Assuming it is his wife's, he stomps off with the intention of leaving her. Caroline confronts everyone, and Joanna confesses that the pregnancy test is hers. Then Elizabeth reveals the long-buried secret that tore their family apart so many years ago: James left them when she admitted she got pregnant by John, meaning that Vicky is John's biological daughter.

The family rushes into town for the kids' nativity play while James finds Peter. As the food Caroline had prepared is ruined, the family spends the day in the nursing home, serving up their meals.

== Cast ==
- Elizabeth Hurley as Joanna Christmas
- John Cleese as John Christmas
- Kelsey Grammer as James Christmas
- Nathalie Cox as Caroline Christmas-Hope
- Talulah Riley as Vicky Christmas
- Kris Marshall as Peter Hope
- Caroline Quentin as Elizabeth Christmas
- April Bowlby as Jackie
- Ray Fearon as Felix
- Naomi Frederick as Paulina Christmas
- Katy Brand as Reverend Jane
- Amelie Prescott as Daisey Christmas-Hope
- Oliver Smith as Henry Christmas-Hope

== Production ==
Filming occurred at Birdsall House, near Malton in September 2020. In November 2020, it was announced that filming had wrapped.

== See also ==
- List of Christmas films
