= Down the Shore (film) =

- DVD cover
- Directed by: Harold Guskin
- Written by: Sandra Jennings
- Starring: Famke Janssen; James Gandolfini
- Cinematography: Richard Rutkowski
- Edited by: Andrew Ford
- Music by: Andrea Morricone
- Production companies: Jersey Shore Films; Lost Weekend Productions; Pipeline Entertainment
- Distributed by: Anchor Bay Entertainment
- Release date: January 7, 2011 (Palm Springs International Film Festival)
- Running time: 93 minutes
- Country: United States
- Language: English

Down the Shore is a 2011 American independent thriller film directed by Harold Guskin and starring James Gandolfini and Famke Janssen.

== Plot ==
The owner of a Jersey shore amusement park is forced to confront his dark past when an enigmatic Frenchman shows up on his doorstep claiming to be his late sister's widowed husband.

== Cast ==
- Famke Janssen as Mary
- James Gandolfini as Bailey
- John Magaro as Martin
- Maria Dizzia as Susan
- Edoardo Costa as Jacques
- Gabrielle Lazure as Brigitte Lebeau
- Ruza Madarevic as Mrs. Denunzio
- Joe Pope as Wiley
- Bill Slover as Tico
- Steve Moreau as Vinny

== Filming ==
Down the Shore was shot in Keansburg, New Jersey and Jersey Shore.

== Reception and release ==
Down the Shore has a 45% on Rotten Tomatoes based on 11 reviews as well as 58% approval, based on 7 reviews on Metacritic. Gabe Toro of IndieWire said that "Down the Shore at least deserves credit for its strong performances (though the less said about too-old John Magaro’s turn as Mary’s autistic son, the better)". The film also received a 1.5 out of 5 from Chuck Bowen of Slant Magazine who said that "the film suggests what might happen if TBS and Bruce Springsteen were to collaborate on a sitcom set in hell".

Variety was quoted saying that "The virtue of this standard family tale is James Gandolfini's most substantial feature role to date", while Michael Rechstshaffen of The Hollywood Reporter said that "a rock solid James Gandolfini performance keeps this slice-of-Jersey-life drama grounded".

The film came out on Blu-ray Disc on April 9, 2013. Besides the film itself, the disc featured Sharon Stone's flick Border Run.
