= Redbox =

Defunct American video streaming company

- Type: Subsidiary
- Traded as: Nasdaq: RDBX (2021–2022)
- Industry: Entertainment
- Founded: 2002; 24 years ago
- Founder: Gregg Kaplan
- Defunct: July 10, 2024; 2 years ago
- Fate: Chapter 7 bankruptcy liquidation by parent company
- Headquarters: Oakbrook Terrace, Illinois, U.S.
- Area served: United States
- Key people: Bill Rouhana, Jonathan Katz
- Products: Films; TV series
- Production output: DVDs
- Services: DVD rental Digital streaming
- Revenue: ▼US$546 million (2020)
- Operating income: ▼US$114 million (2020)
- Net income: ▼US$–90 million (2020)
- Parent: McDonald's (2002–2009); Outerwall (2005–2016); Apollo Global Management (2016–2021); Chicken Soup for the Soul Entertainment (2022–2024)
- Divisions: Redbox Entertainment
- Website: www.redbox.com

Redbox was an American video rental and streaming media company, based in Oakbrook Terrace, Illinois, west of Chicago. Redbox specialized in automated DVD rental kiosks, and operated transactional and ad-supported streaming video and television services. From 2022 until its liquidation, Redbox was a wholly owned subsidiary of Chicken Soup for the Soul Entertainment.

Redbox kiosks, which rented and sold films on DVD and Blu-ray, were located at retail stores, including convenience stores, supermarkets, and pharmacies. At its peak in the early 2010s, the company operated kiosks at more than 34,000 locations, (Note: This is a count of locations which have one or more Redbox kiosks. The total number of individual kiosks was greater (estimated at 42,000 at the company's peak), as some locations have two kiosks. These two counts were often conflated in media mentions of the chain's size.) and controlled more than half of the US DVD rental market.

In June 2024, Chicken Soup for the Soul Entertainment filed for Chapter 11 bankruptcy; the following month, the company's case was converted to Chapter 7 liquidation. As part of ongoing liquidation proceedings, Redbox's online streaming services and mobile app ceased functioning in July 2024.

== History ==
Redbox former logo (2002–2016)

=== Founding under McDonald's ===
Redbox Automated Retail LLC was initially developed in Chicago as a part of "Project 361", a McDonald's business expansion initiative. John Sexton Abrams, a strategy executive at McDonald's, designed the original concept as an immersive kiosk leveraging McDonald's product supply chain and geographic footprint to provide 24/7 access to fresh dairy and other products. Initially, the kiosks sold a range of goods under the name TikTok Easyshops. In late 2003, McDonald's ended its use of the kiosks for the products. Instead, McDonald's executive Gregg Kaplan decided to use the kiosks for DVD rentals, which was tested in Denver in 2004.

The company employed a "return anywhere" policy, different from competitors, which allowed consumers to return their rental to any Redbox kiosk, not just the one from which they originally rented it.

=== Purchase by Coinstar ===
In 2005, Coinstar bought 47% of the company for $32 million, after unsuccessful attempts to sell half the company to Blockbuster and Netflix. In early 2008, Coinstar exercised an option to increase its share to 51%, before acquiring the remainder for $169–176 million in February 2009. While traditional brick and mortar rental stores were closing at a high rate, Redbox moved into existing retail locations such as supermarkets, and placed kiosks within them or outside of them to gain access to that consumer base.

Competitors included Netflix, Blockbuster, Movie Gallery and its subsidiary Hollywood Video, West Coast Video, and Family Video along with other DVD by mail rental services. Mitch Lowe joined Redbox in 2003, after spending five years as an executive at Netflix. At Redbox, he started first as a consultant and then as VP of Purchasing & Operations. In 2005, he became the Chief Operating Officer. Lowe owned and operated a video rental company named Video Droid from 1982 through 1997. Video Droid attempted a VHS rental vending machine concept, though the idea was quickly deemed impractical. Lowe was named President of Redbox in April 2009.

With growing concern in 2009 that DVD kiosks might jeopardize movie studio income from DVD sales and rentals, three major movie studios, 20th Century Fox, Warner Bros., and Universal Studios, each refused to sell DVDs to Redbox until at least 28 days after their arrival in stores. Fox and Warner Bros. represented 62% of home video rental revenue in 2008 and 2009. Redbox responded by filing lawsuits, first, against Universal in October 2008, then against 20th Century Fox and Warner Bros. in August 2009. In August 2009, the federal judge hearing the Universal case allowed the antitrust claim to continue. In October 2009, 20th Century Fox and Warner Bros. filed motions to dismiss Redbox's lawsuits against them. During that time, Redbox continued to rent films from the companies, purchasing them at retail from places like Walmart instead of receiving them from the movie studios, which in some cases saved Redbox money due to the discounted prices offered by retailers. Other major studios, such as Sony Pictures, Paramount Pictures, and Lionsgate, signed distribution deals with Redbox. The Walt Disney Company permits third-party distributors to sell to Redbox, but did not enter into a direct relationship with the company. Both sides of the studio lawsuits pointed to these revenue-sharing deals to shore up their argument, with Redbox president Mitch Lowe saying, "our growth can lead to theirs [the studios' growth]. For example, Redbox currently estimates we will pay more than a combined $1 billion over the next five years to Sony, Lionsgate and Paramount to purchase and then rent new-release DVDs to consumers," while Warner Bros. says the deals are proof that far from being shut out by Hollywood, "Redbox's business has thrived since its suit against Universal, underscored by lucrative distribution deals with Paramount Home Entertainment, Sony Pictures Home Entertainment, and Lionsgate." Redbox entered into an agreement with Warner Bros. on February 16, 2010, followed by Universal and Fox on April 22, 2010.

In the agreements which settle the lawsuits, Redbox agreed to not make available for rental films from these studios until 28 days after their initial home-video releases. Redbox continued to sign additional and new distribution deals with these and other movie studios; by 2017, titles from Fox and Warner became available on Redbox seven days after their initial home-video release.

=== Expansion and new products ===
With over 6,000 kiosks, Redbox surpassed Blockbuster as the largest U.S. video rental chain in November 2007. The company reached 100 million rentals in February 2008, and surpassed 1 billion rentals in September 2010. As of Q2 2011, 68% of the U.S. population lived within a five-minute drive of a Redbox kiosk. In Q2 2011, kiosks accounted for 36% of the disc rental market, with 38% of that attributable to rent-by-mail services and 25% to traditional stores, according to the NPD Group.

Redbox announced in July 2010 that they would introduce Blu-ray movies at 13,000 kiosks; by that fall, Blu-ray discs were available across the Redbox network. In October 2010, the company began offering video game rentals in select markets, including Reno, Nevada; Orlando, Florida; Stevens Point, Wisconsin; Austin, Texas; Wilmington, North Carolina; and Corvallis, Oregon. Video games were available at all Redbox locations by June 2011. In February 2012, Redbox announced the acquisition of Blockbuster Express, a competing kiosk-based rental service operated by NCR in partnership with Blockbuster. The $100 million purchase, completed on June 27, 2012, included over 10,000 kiosks, inventory, and certain retailer contracts. As part of the agreement, Redbox entered a supplier arrangement of purchasing product and services from NCR. The company sold some Blockbuster Express kiosks in less competitive markets to third party providers in June 2013. Also in 2012, Redbox partnered with New Era Tickets and Sparkart to test sales of live event tickets at Redbox kiosks. Redbox Tickets launched in October 2012 in Greater Philadelphia, and later expanded to the Los Angeles area in early 2013.

Redbox announced its 3 billionth disc rental, including both movies and games, in July 2013. The number of items rented from kiosks annually peaked in 2013, with 772.87 million rentals creating $1.97 billion in revenue; that year, Redbox rentals comprised more than 50% of DVD rentals in the United States with 717.13 million units rented in 2014, and 587.55 million in 2015. This decline was widely attributed to consumers' preferences shifting from physical media to online streaming; although as of 2014, Redbox still represented half of the physical media rental market.

==== Expansion into Canada ====
Redbox began offering rentals in Canada in mid-2012. 1,400 kiosks were installed in Canada before Redbox ended operations in the country in March 2015, citing low demand. These kiosks were subsequently relocated to retail stores in the United States.

=== Purchase by Apollo and IPO ===
In August 2012, Redbox's founder, Gregg Kaplan, resigned as president and COO of Redbox, and was succeeded as president by Anne Saunders. Throughout most of 2016, parent company Outerwall was seeking a buyer based on shareholder input. In early September, Outerwall was sold to Apollo Global Management and its three units (Coinstar, ecoATM and Redbox) were split into separate operating companies. In late September 2016, Outerwall CFO Galen Smith was announced as the new CEO of Redbox.

In January 2017, Redbox began moving some of its then-40,000 kiosks, with the intention of analyzing consumer trends and reacting to under-performing neighborhoods. On December 13, 2017, Redbox offered a new video streaming service called Redbox On Demand. The percentage of consumers renting or purchasing movies from Redbox rose in the fourth quarter of 2017 from the third quarter, according to a TiVo survey. That month, Disney sued Redbox, accusing them of violating copyrights by selling codes to download Disney movies such as Star Wars: The Force Awakens and Beauty and the Beast.

In April 2018, Redbox acquired the independent film Benjamin for a 90-day release period through its kiosks and on demand service, as the first Redbox Original. In October 2019, Redbox formed a film and TV series production division, Redbox Entertainment, with Marc Danon as senior advisor of content acquisition. Redbox announced on December 9, 2019, that it would no longer be renting video games but continued selling used video game copies through the end of the year.

Redbox Free Live TV, a free ad-supported streaming television service, was soft launched in early February 2020 with a nationwide launch on February 18. The company's revenue fell 20% in 2019, 36% in 2020 and over 50% in 2021. On May 17, 2021, Redbox announced that it reached a definitive agreement to merge with Seaport Global Acquisition, a special-purpose acquisition company which would result in Redbox being publicly listed on the Nasdaq under the ticker RDBX. The company officially went public on October 25, 2021.

=== Acquisition by Chicken Soup for the Soul Entertainment, bankruptcy and liquidation ===
On May 11, 2022, Chicken Soup for the Soul Entertainment announced its intention to acquire Redbox for $375 million. The acquisition was completed on August 11, 2022, less than a year after Redbox went public. At the end of 2022, the company operated about 34,000 kiosks nationwide, with plans to increase that number with 1,000 more kiosks in 2023. In July 2023, CSSE announced a partnership with the video sharing platform TikTok, under which screens showcasing top content from the service would be installed on at least 3,000 Redbox kiosks. These ads also displayed advertising sold by Chicken Soup for the Soul Entertainment's sales platform Crackle Connex.

In August 2023, convenience store chain 7-Eleven terminated its contract with Redbox due to its failure to pay commissions and demanded the kiosks be removed; Redbox failed to do so. Franchisees began to unplug machines and tape credit card readers shut. 7-Eleven eventually filed a lawsuit in June 2024. In February 2024, drug store chain CVS filed a lawsuit against Redbox for failure to pay commissions during the third quarter of 2022. Convenience store chain Sheetz followed suit the same month for not receiving payments since the end of 2022.

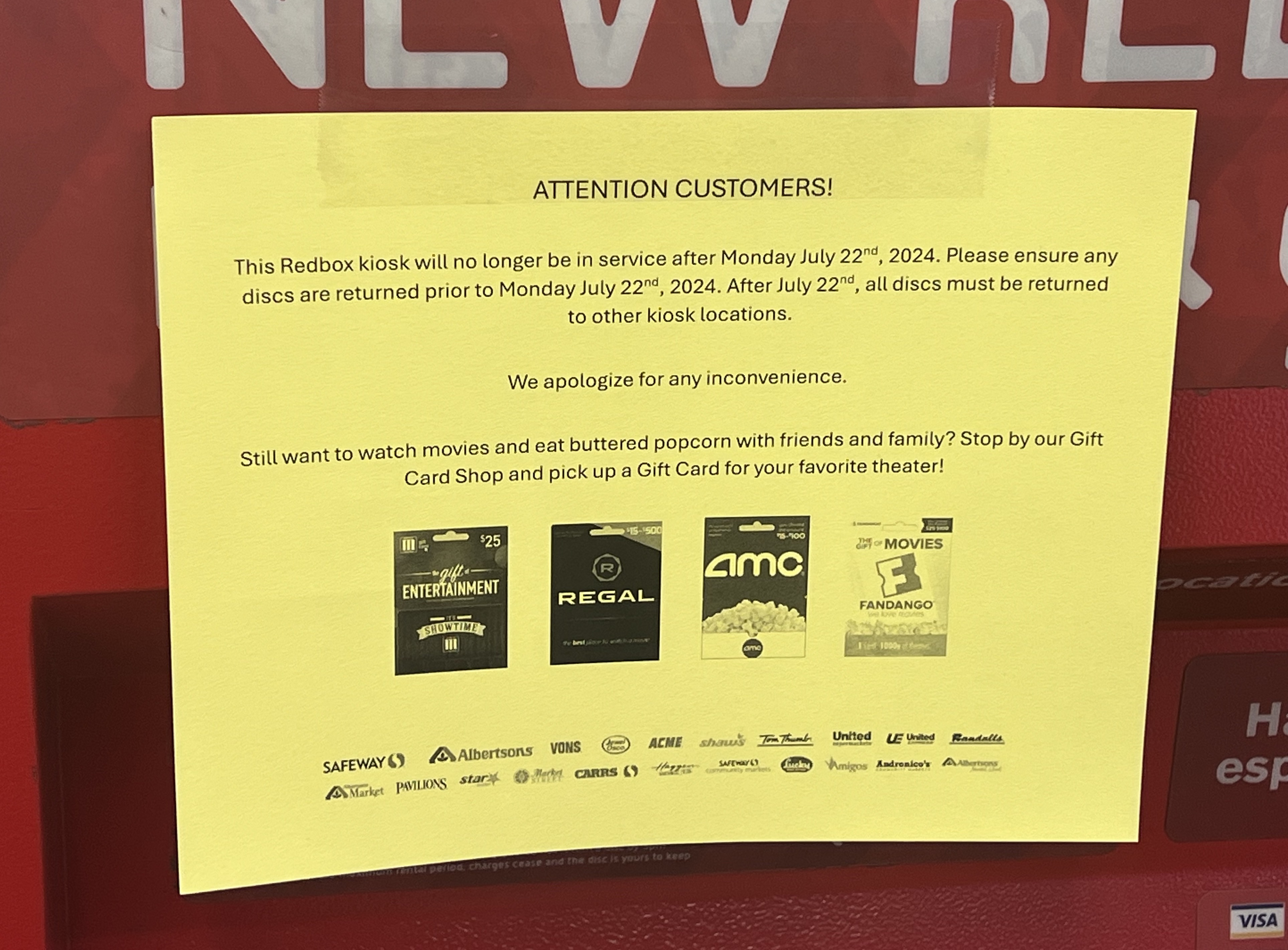
Shutdown notice on a Redbox kiosk at an Albertsons store in Chula Vista, California

On April 23, 2024, Chicken Soup for the Soul Entertainment announced a $636.6 million loss in 2023, and warned that without any options to generate additional financing, the company could be forced to liquidate or pause operations, and seek a potential Chapter 11 bankruptcy protection filing. However, Chicken Soup for the Soul Entertainment did also report that Redbox's sales increased in 2023, seeing a 66% increase in annual revenue to $112.7 million.

By June 15, all Redbox kiosks in Hannaford grocery stores had been shut down. On June 29, 2024, the company filed for Chapter 11 bankruptcy protection after missing a week of paying its employees and failing to secure financing. On July 10, 2024, a bankruptcy judge ordered to convert Chicken Soup for the Soul Entertainment's Chapter 11 bankruptcy into a Chapter 7 bankruptcy liquidation after accusing the company's previous CEO of misusing the business and failing to pay employees or support healthcare. With the Chapter 7 conversion, the company's assets were liquidated, resulting in the shut down of its subsidiaries, including Redbox. In addition, over 1,000 employees were laid off. The company's website and apps were taken down shortly after.

Although many of Redbox's kiosks have been removed, many remaining kiosks are still functional and dispense discs. Some kiosks have been taken by hobbyists and tinkerers who aim to reverse engineer the software used by them. A major company involved in the removal and disposal of Redbox kiosks is The Junkluggers, although most kiosks are removed by independent contractors. The Junkluggers aim to recycle the metal used by the kiosks and donate the DVDs inside to community organizations.

== Rental kiosks ==
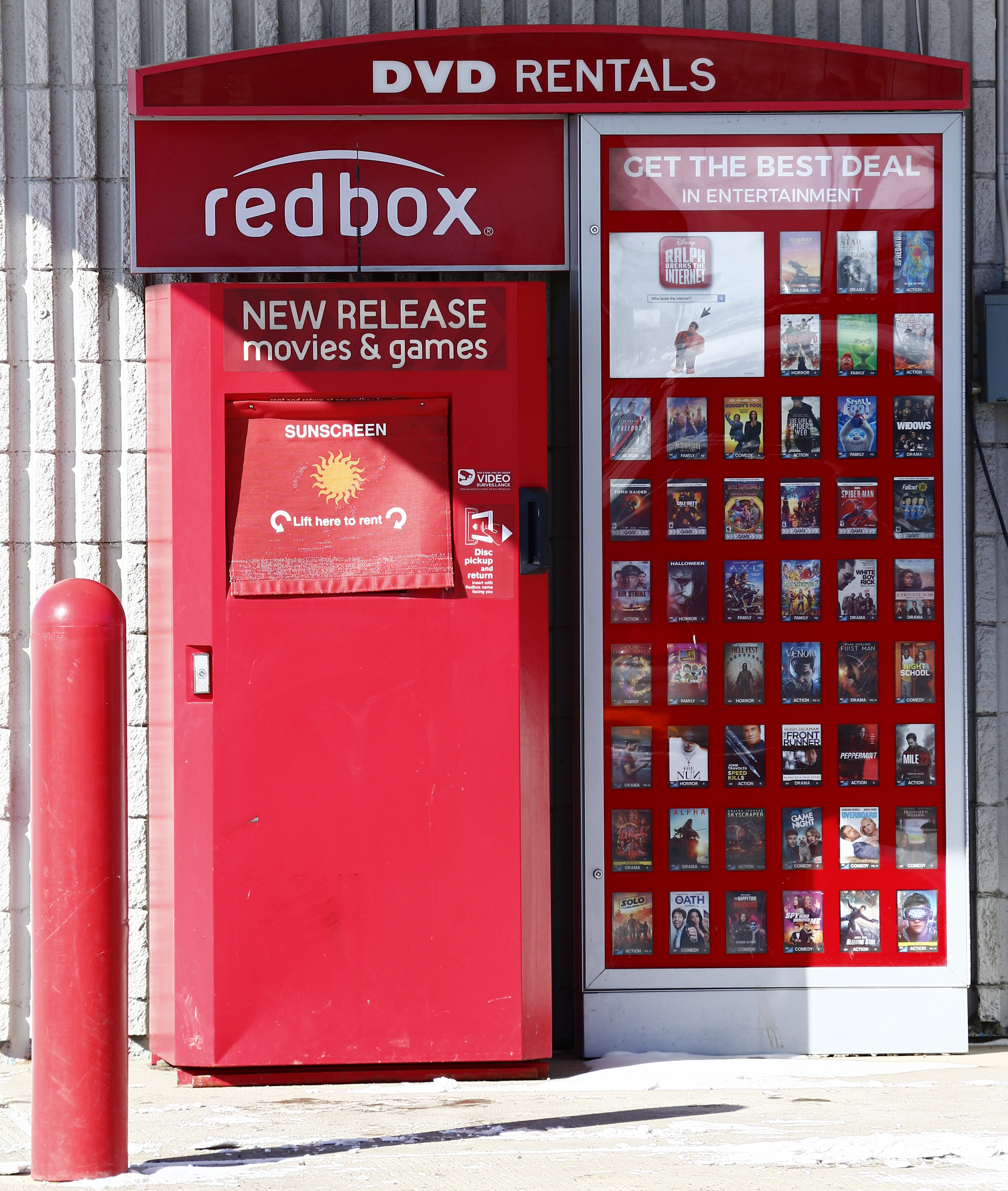
A Redbox kiosk in front of a Loaf 'N Jug in Gillette, Wyoming

Redbox's vending kiosks rented and sold movies on DVD and Blu-Ray discs. Each stocked a selection of roughly 200 titles, with multiple copies of popular titles.

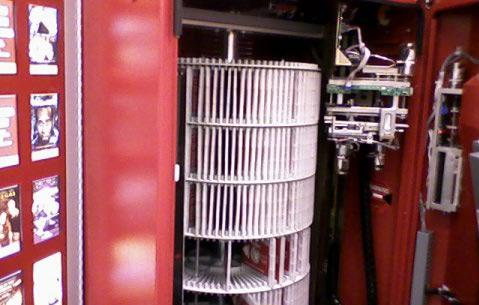
The carousel of discs inside of a Redbox machine

Many Redbox kiosks were installed indoors, while others are located outdoors. They were usually attached to a large sign advertising a selection of featured films, and some locations feature two attached kiosks, allowing for additional selection and stock. Each kiosk was operated by customers via a touchscreen, and contained a robotic disc retrieval system with a stacked carousel capable of holding more than 600 discs. Discs within are marked with barcodes, allowing identification by the kiosk's machinery, and stored on the carousel in thin plastic cases, which are dispensed to customers via a small slot next to the control panel.

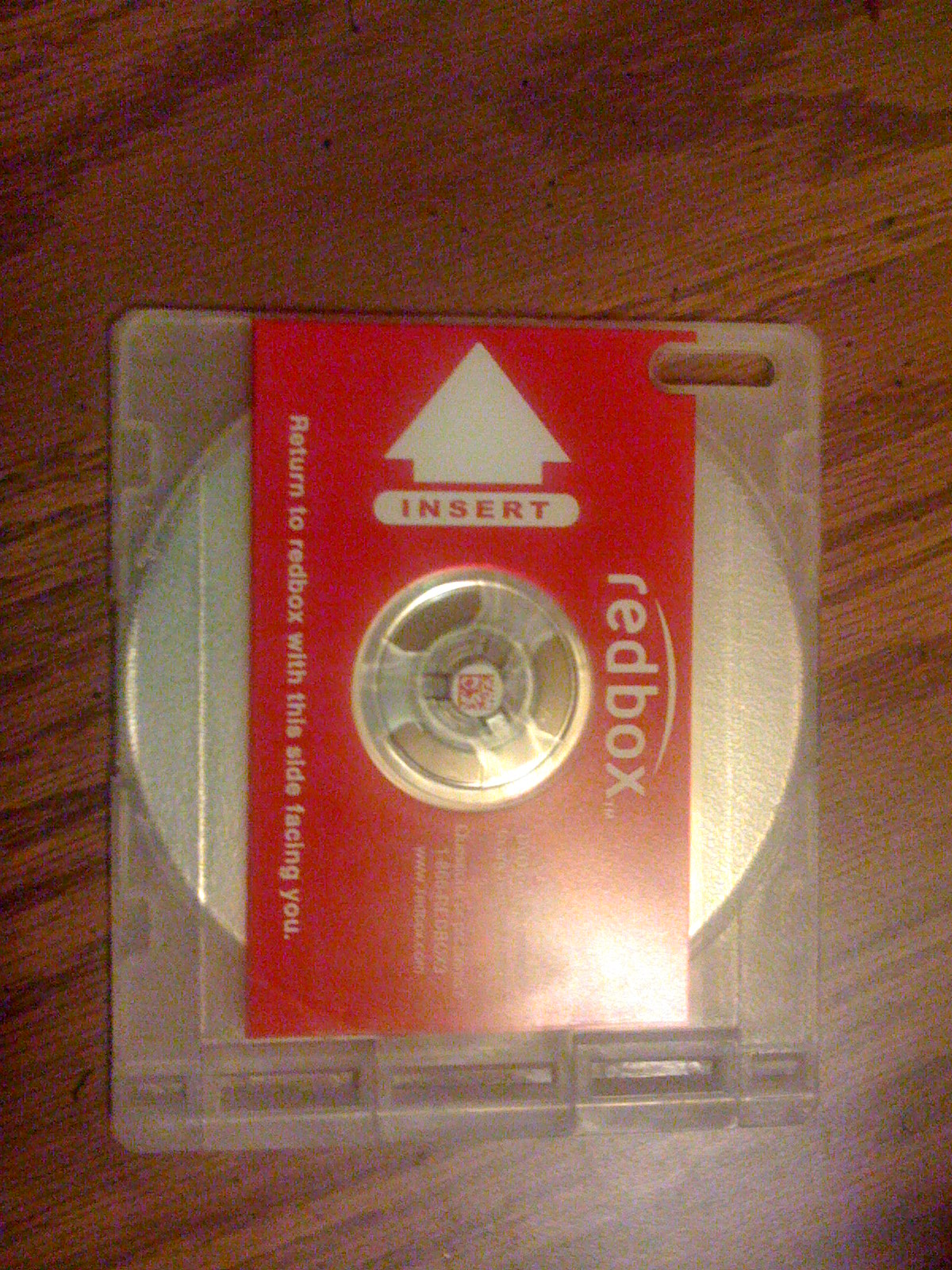
A Redbox barcoded DVD tray, delivered and returned to the kiosk.

Rented discs could be returned to any of the company's kiosks. Charges accrued up to 25 days, after which the customer then owned the DVD (without the original case) and rental charges ceased. Customers could reserve DVDs online, made possible by real-time inventory updates on the company's website. While customers could buy used DVDs from the kiosks (with unsold used DVDs returned to suppliers), Redbox estimated only 3% of the company's revenue came from used-disc sales.

At its peak, a Redbox kiosk rented its average DVD 15 times at an average of $2 per transaction plus any applicable taxes.

From 2010 to 2019, Redbox kiosks rented video games. Initially games for the PlayStation 3, Wii, and Xbox 360 were offered; titles for the Wii U, PlayStation 4, and Xbox One were added in 2014, followed by Nintendo Switch games upon that console's launch in 2017.

=== Equipment history ===
Redbox began in 2004, using re-branded kiosks manufactured and operated by Silicon Valley–based DVDPlay, at 140 McDonald's restaurants in Denver and other test markets. In April 2005, Redbox phased out the DVDPlay-manufactured machines and contracted the Solectron facility in Creedmoor, North Carolina—later purchased by Flextronics International, in October 2007 (Flextronics has been the manufacturer of the Zune, Xbox and Xbox 360)—to create and manufacture a custom kiosk design. The new kiosk was designed by Flextronics' Creedmoor design team including engineers Steven Hancock and John Rupert as key contributors under the direction of Franz Kuehnrich at GetAMovie Inc. (which was bought by RedBox). Other key contributors from Flextronics were Flextronics Global account manager Dave Stadelmaier and Global Supply Chain manager Ben Wheeler (The KioskGuy). Redbox was innovative in that its carousel design not only decreased the number of robotic movements necessary to dispense and restock inventory, it also dramatically increased the number of discs (from 100 to 700+) which could be stored within a kiosk. In addition, the software, designed and developed by Enterprise Logic Systems, was also innovative in that it allowed RedBox to remotely monitor and manage inventory at all kiosks throughout the country.

=== Redbox+ ===
In late December 2020, Redbox began offering a yearly subscription service allowing a subscriber to rent 12 or 24 discs in total, depending on their plan of choice. Only eligible movies could be rented on the plans. It extended the user return window until midnight, giving customers an additional 3 hours to return a movie to a kiosk.

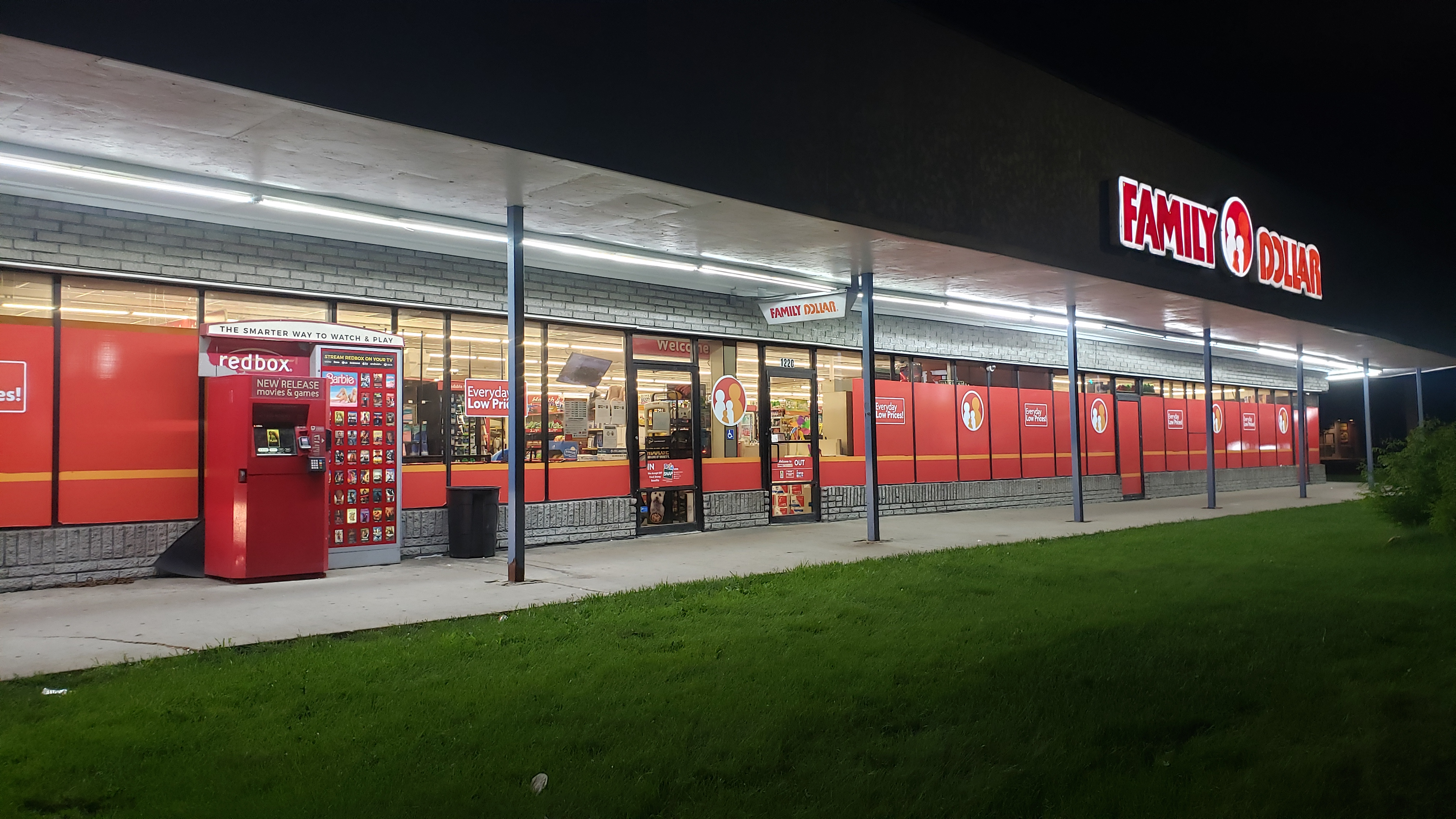
Redbox at a Family Dollar store, still operating in August 2024

=== Major host chains ===
Retail chains hosting Redbox kiosks have included McDonald's, CVS, Walgreens, Dollar General, Family Dollar, Walmart, Market Basket in New England, Kroger in addition to subsidiaries in Albertsons, Safeway, Meijer, Winn-Dixie, Publix, Hannaford in New York and New England, Wegmans, 7-Eleven, Cumberland Farms, Circle K, and Sheetz.

== Streaming services ==
=== Redbox Instant ===
Redbox began internally testing a video streaming service, dubbed Redbox Instant, in July 2012. The service was a joint effort between Redbox and Verizon. On March 14, 2013, Redbox Instant by Verizon officially went public, offering customers a free 1-month trial of an $8/month unlimited streaming service that includes 4 disc rentals from kiosks ($1 more for Blu-ray). The service launched with 4,600 titles from movie companies including Epix, Lionsgate, NBCUniversal, Paramount Pictures, Relativity, and Sony Pictures. According to early reports, Redbox Instant planned to allow users to download content to mobile devices for offline viewing; titles could be either rented or purchased, in SD or HD quality, with rental customers having 30 days to begin viewing their title and 48 hours of unlimited views thereafter.

In June 2013, Sony made the official announcement at E3 (Electronic Entertainment Expo) that Redbox Instant would be available on the PlayStation 4 console, and it was released in late 2013. Android and iOS apps also enabled streaming content on mobile devices.

Redbox Instant disabled sign-ups for new users in mid 2014 owing to a growing number of people using the website to verify stolen credit cards. In Q2 2014 earning call, Outerwall, Redbox's parent company, stated that they were "not pleased" with Redbox Instant subscription numbers. Finally on October 4, 2014, it was announced that Redbox Instant would shut down on October 7, only 19 months after its initial launch.

=== Redbox On Demand ===
On December 13, 2017, Redbox offered a new service called Redbox On Demand. Like Redbox Instant, it was a streaming service, but based on a different model. It did not require any membership, and the list contained new releases as well as several titles that were claimed to never be available on services like Netflix. The service launched with 6,000 titles for on demand rental or electronic sell-through in line with its kiosk operations. The titles came from the major film studios' libraries except for Disney and Lionsgate.

=== Redbox Free Live TV ===
Redbox Free Live TV was an ad supported channel based video on demand service. The service was soft launched in early February 2020 with a nationwide launch on February 18. Nearly 30 channels were offered—three self-branded channels: Redbox Rush (action and adventure), Redbox Comedy and Redbox Spotlight, featured and recommended titles. The service's launch content partner was Lionsgate. Other content suppliers include America's Funniest Home Videos, Cinedigm, Comedy Dynamics, Fremantle, FilmRise, Gravitas, Jukin Media, Kabillion, Maverick Movies, People Are Awesome, TMZ, and USA Today.

== Redbox Entertainment ==
Redbox Entertainment was Redbox's content acquisition and production division.

On April 23, 2019, Redbox acquired the indie film Benjamin for an exclusive 90-day release period via its kiosks and on demand service as a Redbox Original. In October 2019, Redbox formed its film and TV series acquisition division, Redbox Entertainment, with Marc Danon as senior advisor of content acquisition. Then Redbox Entertainment exclusively picked up the distribution rights to Assailant, which was released in March 2022, and Vendetta, which was released in May 2022.

=== Filmography ===
with Quiver Distribution

- The Fanatic (August 2019)
- Running with the Devil (September 2019)
- The Lost Husband (April 2020)
- Becky (June 2020)
- Chick Fight (November 2020)
- Bandit (September 2022)

with Vertical Entertainment

- Capone (May 2020)
- The Informer (December 2020)
- Shadow in the Cloud (January 2021)
- SAS: Red Notice (March 2021)
- American Traitor: The Trial of Axis Sally (May 2021)
- She Ball (August 2021)
- Black Site (May 2022)

with VMI Worldwide

- The Last Son (December 2021)

== See also ==
- DVD-by-mail
- Redbox Automated Retail LLC v. Universal City Studios LLLP
- Video rental shop
