= Kittitian Hill =

Resort in Saint Kitts and Nevis

Coordinates: 17°23′15″N 62°49′49″W

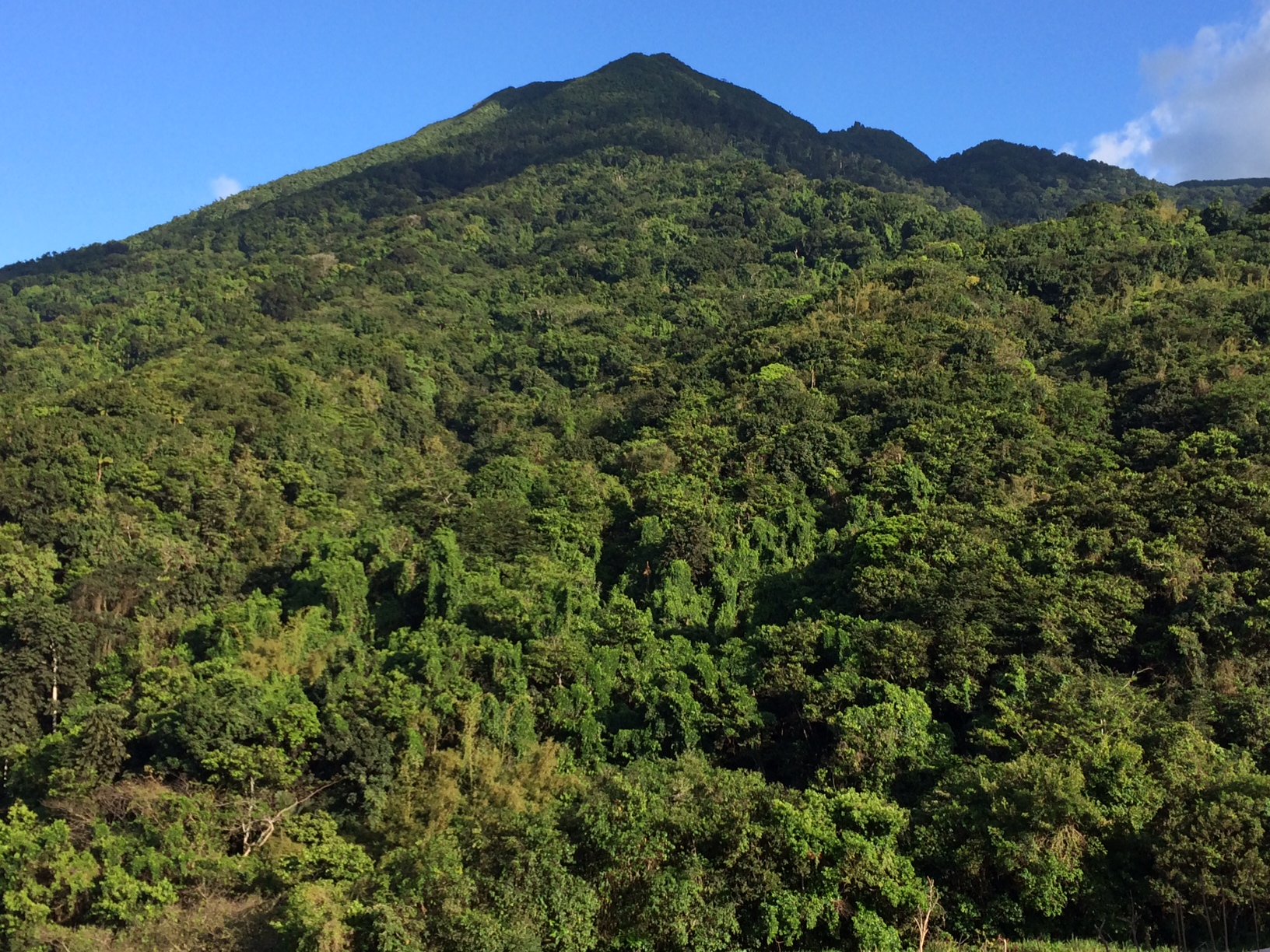
- Company type: Private Company
- Industry: Hospitality, Tourism, Real Estate
- Founded: 2006 Saint Paul Capisterre, Saint Kitts and Nevis
- Founder: Valimik Kempadoo
- Key people: Carlos Salazar (General Manager) Bill Bensley (Architect)
- Total assets: USD 600m
- Owners: Patrick Liotard-Vogt Valimik Kempadoo

The Kittitian Hill is a resort development in Saint Paul Capisterre Parish, Saint Kitts and Nevis. It is set on the hillside with 400 acres of steep contours and flat coastal plain on the north coast between Mount Liamuiga and the Caribbean Sea. It was designed by Bangkok-based architect Bill Bensley.

== History ==
Kittitian Hill was founded in 2006 by Val Kempadoo, a Trinidad-based entrepreneur and leader in sustainability. It was funded by the Sugar Industry Diversification Foundation (SIDF) in 2011.

In July 2013, the SIDF sold its stake to Swiss Entrepreneur Patrick Liotard-Vogt making Kittitian Hill a private company. This allowed them to invest just a few months later in Christophe Harbor, a marina project based in the south east peninsula.

== Amenities and facilities ==
Kittitian Hill is composed of various hospitality components

- Belle Mont Farm: five star sustainable luxury hotel set on a tropical farm.
- Yaya Grove: a collection of secluded villas.
- Village Inn: situated at the heart of the village, it consists of a range of-title condominium apartments within the Kittitian Hill Village.
- Golden Lemon: upscale beachfront property hotel on the beach at Dieppe Bay offering sea food restaurant, beach club and bar.
- Mango Walk Spa: a destination spa in a forest of giant mango trees offering indigenous treatments.
- Irie Fields: 18 hole Championship Golf Course designed by Ian Woosnam known as the most edible golf course in the world.

The first hotel, Belle Mont Farm is scheduled to open its doors in December 2014 along with The Kitchen Restaurant, The Mill Bar and the Red Rum Bar.
