= Niki Spiridakos =

Canadian actress (born 1975)

- Other name: Nikki Spiridakos
- Occupation: Actress

Niki Spiridakos is a Canadian actress and model.

== Filmography ==
=== Film ===
Year	Title	Role	Notes
2004	Dropped Frames	Lori Lane	
2005	Grub	Kruda	
2007	Agenda	Luna	Uncredited
2007	Who's Your Monkey?	Jillian	
2007	Hallows Point	Becky	
2007	Blonde Ambition	Nikolina	
2007	Real Premonition	Debbie	
2009	RoboDoc	Pontangpoo	
2013	The Pardon	Niki	
2013	Murder on Frog Pond Drive	Darlene	
2014	The Single Moms Club	Secretary	
2014	My Not So Irish Bride	Vanessa	
2014	Papou	Zoe Yannis	
2016	Indecent Justice	Maria	
2017	Moontrap: Target Earth	Mya	
2018	Cowboy & Indiana	Ann Shaw	
2019	Dream Killer	Vivian	
2020	Assassin 33 A.D.	Mary	
2021	Black Easter	Mary	
2022	Assailant	Erin	
2023	One Year Off	Megan Prince	
TBA	Black Noise	Laura	

=== Television ===
Year	Title	Role	Notes
2013	The Glades	Martha Cooley	Episode: "Yankee Dan"
2015	The Astronaut Wives Club	Hispanic Housekeeper	Episode: "Flashpoint"
2015	Complications	Natasha Decker	2 episodes
2016	The Detour	Amy	Episode: "The Beach"
2016, 2017	Days of Our Lives	Niki / Helena	2 episodes
2019	True Love Blooms	Partygoer	Television film
2021	Brutal Bridesmaids	Tabitha	Television film
2022	Life's Rewards	Maria	Episode: "No Spiders This Time"
TBA	BTS: The Web Series	Tanya Tietz	2 episodes
