= One Year Off =

Upcoming comedy film

- Film poster
- Directed by: Philippe Martinez
- Written by: Kate Wood; Stewart Thomson
- Produced by: Philippe Martinez
- Starring: Jeff Fahey; Nathalie Cox; Chad Michael Collins; Ray Fearon; Evgeniya Ahkremenko; Niki Spiridakos
- Cinematography: Ross W. Clarkson
- Edited by: Frederic Fournier
- Music by: Bruno Brugnano
- Production companies: MSR Media; Highfield Grange Studios; Goldfinch
- Distributed by: Grindstone Entertainment Group
- Release date: February 7, 2023 (United States)
- Running time: 100 minutes
- Country: United Kingdom
- Language: English

One Year Off is a 2023 British comedy film written by Kate Wood and Stewart Thompson and is directed by Philippe Martinez. The film stars Jeff Fahey, Nathalie Cox, Chad Michael Collins, Ray Fearon, Evgeniya Ahkremenko and Niki Spiridakos.

== Cast ==
- Jeff Fahey as Ben Katsman
- Nathalie Cox as Claire Chambers
- Chad Michael Collins as Harry Buchanan
- Ray Fearon as George Prince
- Evgeniya Ahkremenko as Alex Pudovkin
- Niki Spiridakos as Megan Prince
- Genevieve Capovilla as Ashley Rollins
- Lucas Livesey as Theo Cook
- Antonio Fargas as Charlie Brooks

== Production ==
Principal photography began on February 25, 2021, and concluded on March 25, 2021 in Saint Kitts and Nevis.
