= Coinstar =

American company with a network of coin-cashing machines

Coinstar, LLC
- Formerly: Coinstar, Inc. (1991–2013); Outerwall, Inc. (2013–2017)
- Type: Private
- Industry: Entertainment, DVD rental, coin counting machines, mobile product recycling
- Founded: February 1991; 35 years ago (as Coinstar, Inc.); Bellevue, Washington, US.
- Founders: Jens Molbak, Aaron Finch, Dan Gerrity
- Headquarters: Bellevue, Washington, US.
- Area served: North America, Europe
- Key people: Jim Gaherity (CEO)
- Services: Coin counting services E-payment services
- Revenue: US$ 1.85 billion (2011)
- Operating income: US$209 million (2011)
- Net income: US$104 million (2011)
- Total assets: US$1.48 billion (2011)
- Total equity: US$531 million (2011)
- Owner: Apollo Global Management (2016–present)
- Number of employees: 400+ (2020)

Coinstar, LLC (formerly Outerwall, Inc.) is an American company operating coin-cashing machines.

Coinstar's focus is the conversion of loose change into paper currency, donations, and gift cards via coin counter kiosks which deduct a fee for conversion of coins to banknotes; it processes $2.7 billion worth of coins annually as of 2019. The company also operates Coinstar Exchange for gift cards. Coinstar's kiosks are in the front of stores (between the cash registers and the exit/entrance). The company has more than 60,000 kiosks offering a variety of services in the US, UK, Canada, Puerto Rico, Mexico, and the Eurozone. Coinstar also produces machines that provide prepaid credit cards and e-payment kiosks.

On July 2, 2013, Coinstar changed its name to Outerwall and started trading on the NASDAQ as OUTR.

On September 27, 2016, Apollo Global Management, LLC acquired Outerwall, Inc. and de-listed from NASDAQ. After the acquisition, former components of Outerwall—Redbox, Coinstar, and ecoATM (which includes Gazelle)—became separate business entities.

== History ==
The company was founded in 1991 as Coinstar, Inc. and is headquartered in Bellevue, Washington.

Outerwall cooperated with the US Mint in the introduction of the Golden Dollar at the beginning of the millennium and encouraged people to use coins rather than notes.

In February 2009, Coinstar purchased all remaining shares of DVD rental kiosk company Redbox for $175 million from McDonald's Corporation, making Outerwall the sole owner. Prior to this, Coinstar and McDonald's each owned 47% of Redbox shares, with various other parties owning the remaining 6%.

In September 2009, Coinstar sold its entertainment business, which included skill cranes and bulk vending, to three entrepreneurs, a month after the business was renamed National Entertainment Network.

=== Outerwall ===
Outerwall logo

On June 28, 2013, shareholders voted to change the company name from Coinstar to Outerwall. On July 2, 2013, Outerwall acquired mobile phone recycling kiosk operator ecoATM, for $350 million (not including debt).

On October 7, 2013, Barry Rosenstein's hedge fund JANA Partners filed a 13D on shares of Outerwall (OUTR) and disclosed a new 13.5% ownership stake in OUTR with 3,777,995 shares. The activist 13D filing indicated that JANA expected to talk with management—in particular, that they wanted to focus on "a review of strategic alternatives including exploring a strategic transaction, selling or discontinuing certain businesses, or pursuing a sale." Subsequently, on December 9, 2013, Outerwall's former CEO, J. Scott Di Valerio, announced it would discontinue three new ventures: Redbox's Rubi, Crisp Market, and Star Studio, and lay off 8.5% of its workforce.

=== Coinstar ===
In late September 2016, Outerwall announced CEO Erik E. Prusch would be leaving the company as part of the company's acquisition by Apollo Global Management. Outerwall's subsidiaries, Redbox, and ecoATM, were separated into stand alone companies as was Coinstar.

== Coinstar kiosks ==
Former Coinstar logo, currently used exclusively for kiosks.

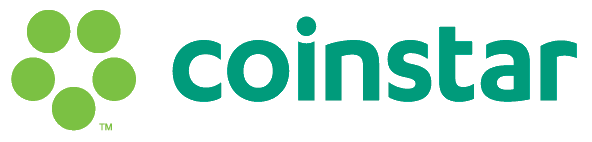
The new logo was launched in 2011.

The typical Coinstar coin-cashing kiosk is green (blue in the UK) and the size of a large vending machine. They are located at grocery stores, drug stores, larger merchants, banks or other retail locations. The coin-counting service is available in the US (including Puerto Rico), Canada, the UK, and the Eurozone.

To process coins, loose change is poured into the machine. In the United States, the machine accepts all denominations of coins from one-cent coins to one-dollar coins, its only restriction being 1943 steel cents and Eisenhower Dollars. Likewise in Canada, all denominations are accepted except 50 cent coins, Voyageur Dollars and nickels of tombac and chrome-plated steel (American pennies, nickels, dimes and quarters are also accepted at par.) When the machine finishes counting coins, it issues a scrip, called a voucher, which the user can redeem at the place of business providing the coin-counting service at face value for currency. The same mode of operation and redemption is provided on those Coinstar machines situated in Great Britain, Canada, Eurozone, and Puerto Rico.

The coin-counting processing fee, deducted from the total once coins have been counted, is 12.5% in the US, 11.9% in Canada, 10.9% in Ireland, and 10.9% in the UK, unless the kiosk is located inside a bank branch, in which case this fee will not apply for account holders and the money can be directly deposited into an account by a teller. Some machines may offer a lower rate; in this case the store hosting the machine has subsidized the rate.

A newer service enables users to use their coins to buy a gift card from merchants without the usual fee ("no fee")—including such retailers as Starbucks, Amazon.com, Banana Republic, Gap, Regal Entertainment Group, Old Navy, J.C. Penney, CVS Pharmacy, and Overstock.com. Select grocery retailers, including SuperValu and Stop & Shop, are also participating in the "no fee" offers. If the user chooses the fee-free option, the machine issues a plastic gift card or, in the case of online merchants like Amazon.com, a voucher with a redemption code valid only for a single use, where after any remaining balance is forfeit regardless of amount.

US and UK users also have the option of donating their change to a selected charity. By 2006, Outerwall has raised more than $20 million for charities including the American Red Cross Disaster Relief fund, Leukemia and Lymphoma Society, and UNICEF's Trick or Treat program.

Outerwall has processed more than 350 billion coins in its nearly two decades of operation, with an average transaction amount of about $38. The largest single transaction was $13,000 in pennies from a man in Alabama.

As of August 2021, more than 7,000 Coinstar kiosks in 46 states were equipped with Coinme, enabling customers to convert cash to cryptocurrency.

== Competition ==
In some sections of the UK, regional banks have begun offering free coin-counting services in the amount of a gift card. Refunds are often given in cash rather than in the form of a gift card. In some cases, it is not even necessary for the customer to have an account at the bank; the free service is offered as a way to attract new business from individuals who are not current account holders. TD Bank's "Penny Arcade" coin counters were free and available to both customers and non-customers in many branches, but as of November 2010, the bank charges a 6% fee for non-customers to use the machine. In May 2016, in the wake of a New York state lawsuit over accuracy, TD Bank said that it had suspended use of its Penny Arcade machines and would be removing them from all of its locations.

== Publicity ==
On May 9, 2006, Outerwall sued rival Coin X change over a patent dispute around the use of voucher-issuing machines, remote reporting of the coin machines' status and anti-counterfeiting technology for printed vouchers.

To generate publicity, Outerwall offered to cash in over 1.3 million pennies collected over four decades by Flomaton, Alabama resident Edmond Knowles after Knowles's bank refused to cash them in. The armored truck sent by Outerwall to Knowles's home sank into the mud in his yard after being loaded with the 4.5-ton collection, and needed to be rescued by a tow truck.

On March 14, 2008, an employee was arrested for stealing $441,000 from Coinstar machines in Washington, Oregon, and California. The employee was accused of illegally accessing the Coinstar machines' cash boxes ahead of armored car pickups.

On March 25, 2008, Roy Disney used his Shamrock Activist Value Fund of Burbank to ask for changes in Outerwall's corporate governance.

== Gallery ==
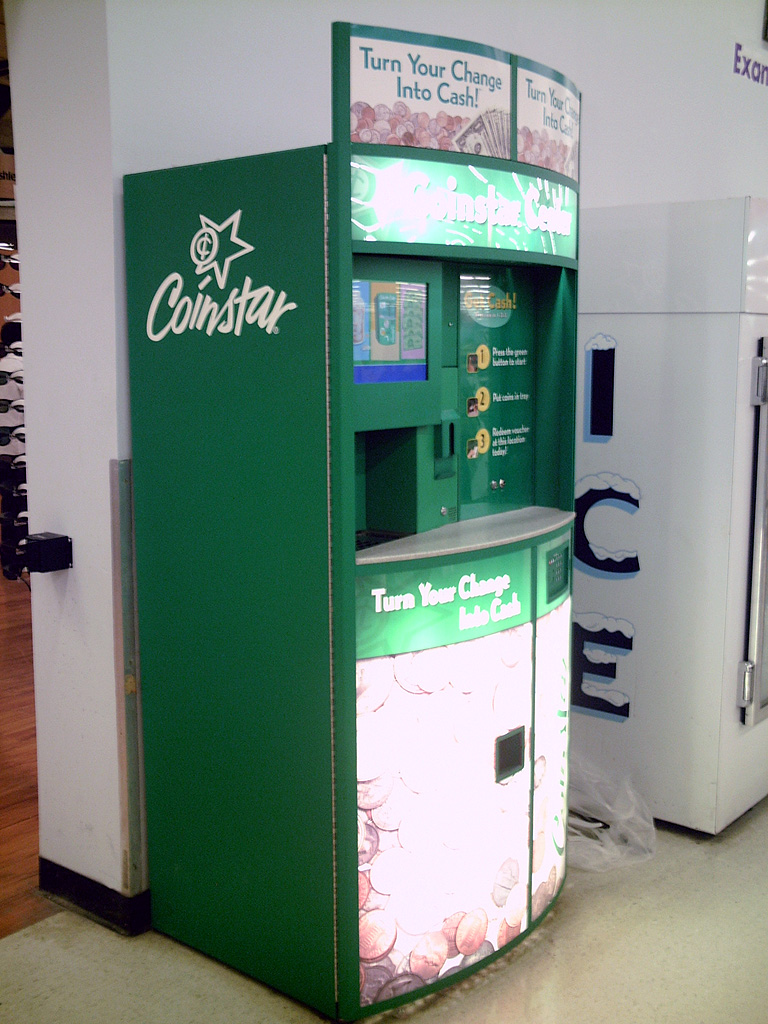
A Coinstar machine in the United States

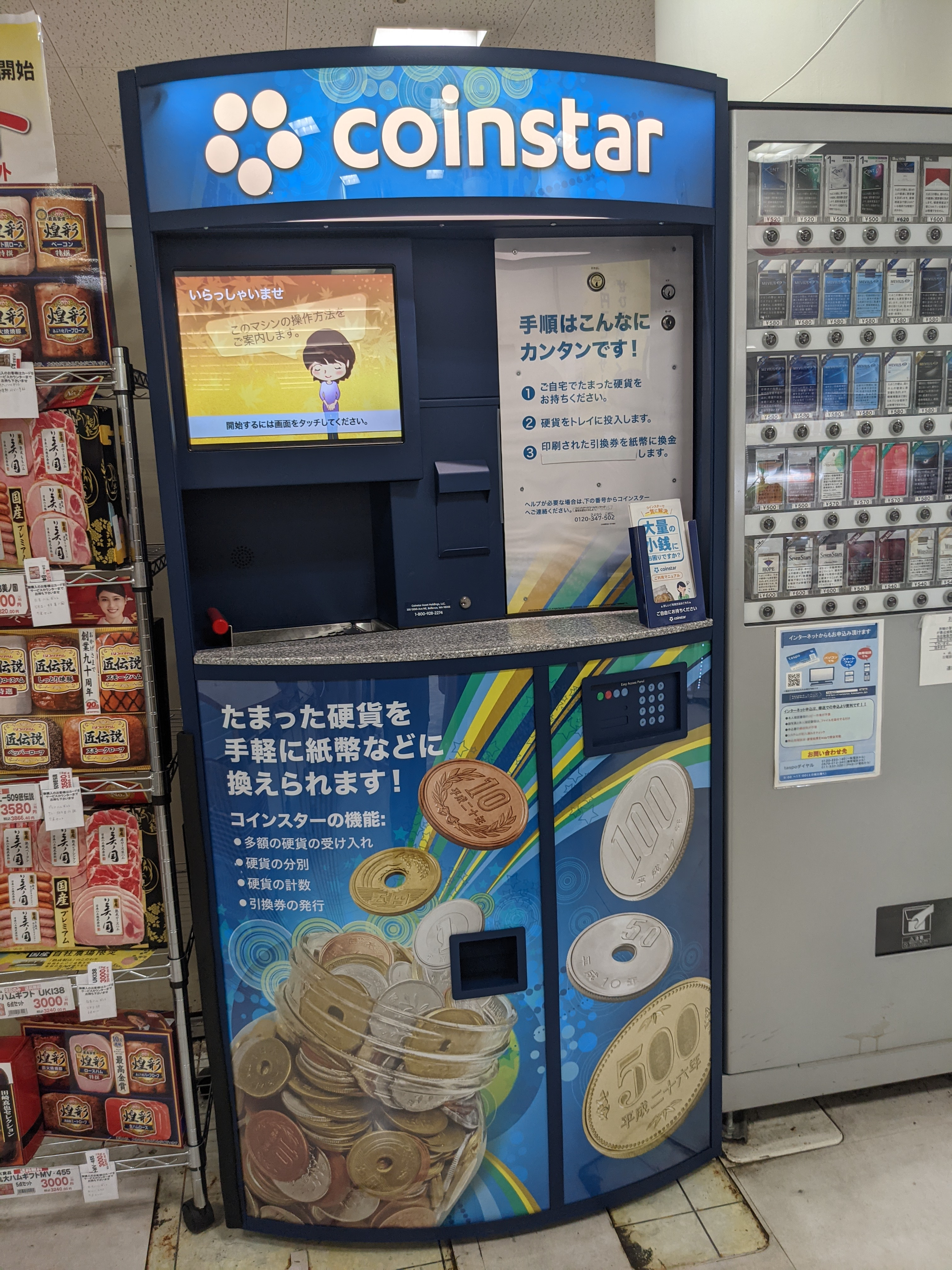
A Coinstar machine in Japan

Coinstar receipt
