= Rana Iqbal Ahmad Khan =

Rana Iqbal Ahmad Khan رانا اقبال احمد خان
- Born: Talwandi, Patiala State, British India (now Punjab, India)
- Education: Islamia College; University of the Punjab
- Occupations: Lawyer and politician
- Political party: Pakistan Peoples Party; Pakistan Awami Tehrik
- Parent: Rana Khurshid Ahmad Khan (father)

Rana Iqbal Ahmad Khan (Urdu/Punjabi: رانا اقبال احمد خان) is a Pakistani lawyer and former politician who previously served as a provincial cabinet minister in the Punjab government. A veteran member of the Pakistan Peoples Party (PPP), he began his legal career in the mid-1960s and also entered politics at around the same time. He is a practicing advocate in the Supreme Court and a member of the District Bar Association of Gujranwala. More recently, he has been associated with Tahir-ul-Qadri and his Pakistan Awami Tehreek movement.

== Background ==
Khan was born in the village of Talwandi in the Patiala State (now in eastern Punjab), in pre-partition British India. He belongs to a Rajput family and his father Rana Khurshid Ahmad Khan was a zamindar (landlord). Following the partition of India in 1947, his family migrated to Pakistan and settled in the village of Sanhara Geraya in Gujranwala District, Punjab. He is a resident of Satellite Town, Gujranwala.

== Education ==
Khan matriculated from the Government High School in Gujranwala in 1957, following which he studied at the Islamia College in Lahore, graduating in 1961. He later pursued a Master of Arts degree in Persian at the Punjab University in 1963, and completed a Bachelor of Laws at the same university in 1965.

== Legal and political career ==
Khan began his legal practice in 1965 at the District Court of Gujranwala. In 1968, he became an advocate in the Lahore High Court. He entered politics at a young age as one of the grassroots members of the Pakistan Peoples Party (PPP), establishing a working relationship with Zulfiqar Ali Bhutto and playing a key role in organising the party's early democratic movement. During his political career, Khan served as a chairman of the Pakistan Peoples Party in Gujranwala District and also chaired the Gujranwala Kissan Committee (farmers' committee). He also contested in elections on behalf of the PPP and became a member of the Provincial Assembly of the Punjab in December 1970.

He later became a minister in the cabinet of the PPP-led provincial Government of Punjab, serving in various departments. In recent times, Rana Iqbal has been affiliated with the Pakistan Awami Tehreek, led by the religious scholar and academic Tahir-ul-Qadri. He is a member of the District Bar Association in Gujranwala, and is now a senior advocate with the Supreme Court.

Political offices
Preceded by Unknown	Cabinet minister in Government of Punjab	Succeeded by Unknown
