= List of statutory instruments of the United Kingdom, 1990 =

This is a complete list of all 1,646 statutory instruments published in the United Kingdom in the year 1990.

== Statutory instruments ==
=== 1-499 ===
==== 1–100 ====
- Caseins and Caseinates (Scotland) Amendment Regulations 1990 (S.I. 1990/1)
- Personal Community Charge (Relief) (England) Regulations 1990 (S.I. 1990/2)
- Welfare Food Amendment Regulations 1990 (S.I. 1990/3)
- Civil Aviation Authority (Amendment) Regulations 1990 (S.I. 1990/9)
- Local Government Finance Act 1988 (Miscellaneous Amendments and Repeals) Order 1990 (S.I. 1990/10)
- Electrical Equipment for Explosive Atmospheres (Certification) Regulations 1990 (S.I. 1990/13)
- Merseyside Residuary Body (Winding Up) (Amendment) Order 1990 (S.I. 1990/17)
- Stock Transfer (Substitution of Forms) Order 1990 (S.I. 1990/18)
- Banking Act 1987 (Exempt Transactions) (Amendment) Regulations 1990 (S.I. 1990/20)
- Petty Sessional Divisions (Gwent) Order 1990 (S.I. 1990/26)
- Financial Services Act 1986 (Investment Advertisements) (Exemptions) Order 1990 (S.I. 1990/27)
- British Citizenship (Designated Service) (Amendment) Order 1990 (S.I. 1990/28)
- Export of Sheep (Prohibition) (No. 2) Amendment Order 1990 (S.I. 1990/30)
- Food Protection (Emergency Prohibitions) (England) Amendment Order 1990 (S.I. 1990/31)
- Food Protection (Emergency Prohibitions) Amendment Order 1990 (S.I. 1990/32)
- Food Protection (Emergency Prohibitions) (Wales) (No. 5) Amendment Order 1990 (S.I. 1990/34)
- Bournemouth and District, South West, Tendring Hundred and West Hampshire (Pipelaying and Other Works) (Codes of Practice) Order 1990 (S.I. 1990/36)
- Food Protection (Emergency Prohibitions) (Contamination of Feeding Stuffs) (England) Order 1990 Approved by both Houses of Parliament (S.I. 1990/37)
- Social Security Benefit (Persons Abroad) Amendment Regulations 1990 (S.I. 1990/40)
- Local Government (Politically Restricted Posts) Regulations 1990 (S.I. 1990/42)
- Food Protection (Emergency Prohibitions) (Contamination of Feeding Stuff) (Wales) Order 1990 (S.I. 1990/43)
- Act of Sederunt (Fees in the Scottish Record Office) 1990 (S.I. 1990/44)
- Insider Dealing (Recognised Stock Exchange) (No. 2) Order 1990 (S.I. 1990/47)
- Milk Quota (Calculation of Standard Quota) (Amendment) Order 1990 (S.I. 1990/48)
- River Tay Catchment Area Protection (Renewal) Order 1990 (S.I. 1990/49)
- River Earn Catchment Area Protection Order 1990 (S.I. 1990/50)
- Airports (Designation) (Removal and Disposal of Vehicles) Order 1990 (S.I. 1990/54)
- Education (Inner London Education Authority) (Staff Transfer) Order 1990 (S.I. 1990/59)
- Fife and Tayside Regions and North East Fife and Perth and Kinross Districts (Butterwell/Burnside) Boundaries Amendment Order 1990 (S.I. 1990/60) (S. 5)
- Income Tax (Sub-Contractors in the Construction Industry) (Amendment) Regulations 1990 (S.I. 1990/61)
- Registration of Births, Deaths and Marriages (Fees) Order 1990 (S.I. 1990/65)
- Relevant Population (England) Regulations 1990 (S.I. 1990/68)
- Charging Authorities (Notification of Population to Precepting Authorities) (England) Regulations 1990 (S.I. 1990/69)
- Levying Bodies (General) Regulations 1990 (S.I. 1990/70)
- Transport Levying Bodies Regulations 1990 (S.I. 1990/71)
- Internal Drainage Boards (Finance) Regulations 1990 (S.I. 1990/72)
- Social Security (Industrial Injuries and Diseases) Miscellaneous Provisions (Amendment) Regulations 1990 (S.I. 1990/73)
- Income Tax (Employments) (No. 19) Regulations 1990 (S.I. 1990/79)
- Registration of Births, Deaths, Marriages, Etc. (Prescription of Forms) (Scotland) Amendment Regulations 1990 (S.I. 1990/85)
- Self-Governing Schools etc. (Scotland) Act 1989 (Commencement) Order 1990 (S.I. 1990/86)
- Children's Homes (Control and Discipline) Regulations 1990 (S.I. 1990/87)
- Motor Vehicles (Type Approval) (Great Britain) (Amendment) Regulations 1990 (S.I. 1990/94)
- A3 Trunk Road (Robin Hood Way, Kingston upon Thames) (Prohibition of Use of Gap in Central Reservation) Order 1990 (S.I. 1990/95)
- Companies Act 1989 (Commencement No. 1) Order 1990 (S.I. 1990/98)

== 101–200 ==
- Industrial Training Levy (Plastics Processing) Order 1990 (S.I. 1990/101)
- Social Security Act 1989 (Commencement No. 3) Order 1990 (S.I. 1990/102)
- Disposal of Court Records (Scotland) Regulations 1990 (S.I. 1990/106)
- Community Charges (Deductions from Income Support) Regulations 1990 (S.I. 1990/107)
- The Gedling (Parishes) Order 1990 S.I. 1990/108
- Bovine Offal (Prohibition) (Scotland) Regulations 1990 (S.I. 1990/112)
- Community Charges (Deductions from Income Support) (Scotland) (Amendment) Regulations 1990 (S.I. 1990/113)
- Public Telecommunication System Designation (Cable North (Cumbernauld) Ltd) Order 1990 (S.I. 1990/114)
- Public Telecommunication System Designation (Cable North (Dumbarton) Ltd) Order 1990 (S.I. 1990/115)
- Public Telecommunication System Designation (Cable North (Motherwell) Ltd) Order 1990 (S.I. 1990/116)
- Electricity Act 1989 (Commencement No. 2) Order 1990 (S.I. 1990/117)
- National Rivers Authority (Levies) Regulations 1990 (S.I. 1990/118)
- Water Supply (Water Quality) (Scotland) Regulations 1990 (S.I. 1990/119)
- Controlled Waters (Lochs and Ponds) (Scotland) Order 1990 (S.I. 1990/120)
- Surface Waters (Classification) (Scotland) Regulations 1990 (S.I. 1990/121)
- Merchant Shipping (Formal Investigations) (Amendment) Rules 1990 (S.I. 1990/123)
- Education (Inner London Education Authority) (Property Transfer) Order 1990 (S.I. 1990/124)
- Local Government (Compensation for Premature Retirement) (Scotland) Amendment Regulations 1990 (S.I. 1990/125)
- Surface Waters (Dangerous Substances) (Classification) (Scotland) Regulations 1990 (S.I. 1990/126)
- Income-related Benefits Schemes Amendment Regulations 1990 (S.I. 1990/127)
- Export of Goods (Control) (Amendment) Order 1990 (S.I. 1990/128)
- Standard Community Charge (Multipliers) Order 1990 (S.I. 1990/129)
- Revenue Support Grant (Scotland) Order 1989S.I. 1990/130)
- Revenue Support Grant (Scotland) Order 1990 (S.I. 1990/131)
- Dairy Produce Quotas (Amendment) Regulations 1990 (S.I. 1990/132)
- Sea Fishing (Enforcement of Community Conservation Measures) (Amendment) Order 1990 (S.I. 1990/136)
- Sea Fishing (Enforcement of Community Quota Measures) Order 1990 (S.I. 1990/137)
- Third Country Fishing (Enforcement) Order 1990 (S.I. 1990/138)
- Free Zone (Liverpool) Designation (Variation) Order 1990 (S.I. 1990/139)
- Coroners' Records (Fees for Copies) (Amendment) Rules 1990 (S.I. 1990/140)
- Companies Act 1989 (Commencement No. 2) Order 1990 (S.I. 1990/142)
- Children (Admissibility of Hearsay Evidence) Order 1990 (S.I. 1990/143)
- Driving Licences (Community Driving Licence) Regulations 1990 (S.I. 1990/144)
- Non-Domestic Rating (Collection and Enforcement) (Miscellaneous Provisions) Regulations 1990 (S.I. 1990/145)
- Community Charges (Co-owners) Regulations 1990 (S.I. 1990/146)
- British Gas Corporation (Dissolution) Order 1990 (S.I. 1990/147)
- Pyramid Selling Schemes (Amendment) Regulations 1990 (S.I. 1990/150)
- Community Charges and Non-Domestic Rating (Demand Notices) (England) Regulations 1990 (S.I. 1990/156)
- Local Elections (Parishes and Communities) (Amendment) Rules 1990 (S.I. 1990/157)
- Local Elections (Principal Areas) (Amendment) Rules 1990 (S.I. 1990/158)
- Avon, Somerset and Wiltshire (County Boundaries) Order 1990 (S.I. 1990/159)
- Household Appliances (Noise Emission) Regulations 1990 (S.I. 1990/161)
- Standard Community Charge and Non-Domestic Rating (Definition of Domestic Property) Order 1990 (S.I. 1990/162)
- Electricity Supply Pension Scheme (Eligible Persons) Regulations 1990 (S.I. 1990/164)
- Gloucestershire and Wiltshire (County Boundaries) Order 1990 (S.I. 1990/170)
- The East Hertfordshire (Parishes) Order 1990 S.I. 1990/171
- Land Registration Fee Order 1990 (S.I. 1990/172)
- Drainage Rates (Forms) Regulations 1990 (S.I. 1990/173)
- National Health Service (Recognition of health service bodies) (Scotland) Order 1990 (S.I. 1990/177)
- Housing (Preservation of Right to Buy) (Amendment) Regulations 1990 (S.I. 1990/178)
- Housing (Extension of Right to Buy) Order 1990 (S.I. 1990/179)
- Education (School and Placing Information) (Scotland) Amendment Regulations 1990 (S.I. 1990/181)
- Local Authorities (Publicity Account) (Exemption) (Scotland) Amendment Order 1990 (S.I. 1990/182)
- College Councils (Scotland) Regulations 1990 (S.I. 1990/183)
- Electricity Act 1989 (Fees) Order 1990 (S.I. 1990/184)
- Buckinghamshire (District Boundaries) Order 1990 (S.I. 1990/185)
- Opencast Coal (Rate of Interest on Compensation) Order 1990 (S.I. 1990/188)
- Employment Act 1989 (Commencement and Transitional Provisions) Order 1990 (S.I. 1990/189)
- Railway Employment Exemption Regulations 1962 (Revocation) Order 1990 (S.I. 1990/190)
- Local Government and Housing Act 1989 (Commencement No. 4) Order 1990 (S.I. 1990/191)
- Electricity (Applications for Licences and Extensions of Licences) Regulations 1990 (S.I. 1990/192)
- Electricity (Class Exemptions from the Requirement for a Licence) Order 1990 (S.I. 1990/193)
- Electricity (Register) Order 1990 (S.I. 1990/194)
- Housing Support Grant (Scotland) Variation Order 1990 (S.I. 1990/195)
- Housing Support Grant (Scotland) Order 1990 (S.I. 1990/196)
- Electricity Act 1989 (Transfer Date) (Scotland) Order 1990 (S.I. 1990/197)
- London Government Reorganisation (Pensions etc.) (Amendment) Order 1990 (S.I. 1990/198)
- Official Secrets Act 1989 (Commencement) Order 1990 (S.I. 1990/199)
- Official Secrets Act 1989 (Prescription) Order 1990 (S.I. 1990/200)

== 201–300 ==
- Housing (Right to Buy) (Prescribed Forms) (Amendment) Regulations 1990 (S.I. 1990/207)
- East of Abercynon – East of Dowlais Trunk Road (A4060) (Phase 2 – Improvement between Pentrebach and Mountain Hare and Slip Roads) Order 1990 (S.I. 1990/209)
- Medicines (Fees Relating to Medicinal Products for Human Use) Amendment Regulations 1990 (S.I. 1990/210)
- LondonFolkestoneDover Trunk Road A20 (Court Wood to Dover Section) Order 1990 (S.I. 1990/211)
- London-Folkestone-Dover Trunk Road A20 (Dawkinge Wood to Court Wood Section and Slip Roads) Order 1990 (S.I. 1990/212)
- London-Folkestone-Dover Trunk Road A20 (Folkestone-Dover Section Detrunking) Order 1990 (S.I. 1990/213)
- Drainage Charges Regulations 1990 (S.I. 1990/214)
- Prevention of Terrorism (Temporary Provisions) Act 1989 (Commencement No. 2) Order 1990 (S.I. 1990/215)
- Offshore Installations (Safety Zones) Order 1990 (S.I. 1990/216)
- Food Protection (Emergency Prohibitions) (Contamination of Feeding Stuff) (England) (Revocation) Order 1990 (S.I. 1990/217)
- Statutory Maternity Pay (Compensation of Employers) and Statutory Sick Pay (Additional Compensation of Employers) Amendment Regulations 1990 (S.I. 1990/218)
- Food Protection (Emergency Prohibitions) (Contamination of Feeding Stuff) (Wales) (Revocation) Order 1990 (S.I. 1990/219)
- Criminal Justice Act 1988 (Commencement No. 10) Order 1990 (S.I. 1990/220)
- Education (Training Grants) (Amendment) Regulations 1990 (S.I. 1990/221)
- Bovine Spongiform Encephalopathy Compensation Order 1990 (S.I. 1990/222)
- General Drainage Charges (Anglian Region) Order 1990 (S.I. 1990/223)
- Electricity Act 1989 (Nominated Companies) (England and Wales) Order 1990 (S.I. 1990/224)
- Electricity Act 1989 (Transfer Date) (England and Wales) Order 1990 (S.I. 1990/225)
- Cambridgeshire, Norfolk and Suffolk (County Boundaries) Order 1990 (S.I. 1990/228)
- Superannuation (Children's Pensions) (Earnings Limit) Order 1990 (S.I. 1990/230)
- Electricity Council and Electricity Boards Regulations 1990 (S.I. 1990/231)
- Poultry (Seizure of Hatching Eggs) Order 1990 (S.I. 1990/232)
- Commons Regulation (Therfield) Provisional Order Confirmation Act 1888 (Amendment) Order 1990 (S.I. 1990/233)
- Protection of Wrecks (Designation No. 1) Order 1990 (S.I. 1990/234)
- Atomic Energy (Mutual Assistance Convention) Order 1990 (S.I. 1990/235)
- European Communities (Definition of Treaties) (European School) Order 1990 (S.I. 1990/236)
- European Communities (Privileges of the European School) Order 1990 (S.I. 1990/237)
- Security Service Act 1989 (Overseas Territories) Order 1990 (S.I. 1990/238)
- United Kingdom Forces (Jurisdiction of Colonial Courts) (Amendment) Order 1990 (S.I. 1990/239)
- United Kingdom Forces (Jurisdiction of Colonial Courts) (Amendment No. 2) Order 1990 (S.I. 1990/240)
- Visiting Forces (Designation) (Colonies) (Amendment) Order 1990 (S.I. 1990/241)
- Visiting Forces Act (Application to Colonies) (Amendment) Order 1990 (S.I. 1990/242)
- Census Order 1990 (S.I. 1990/243)
- Health Service Commissioner for England (Special Hospitals Service Authority) Order 1990 (S.I. 1990/244)
- Electricity Supply (Amendment) (Northern Ireland) Order 1990 (S.I. 1990/245)
- Employment (Miscellaneous Provisions) (Northern Ireland) Order 1990 (S.I. 1990/246)
- Health and Personal Social Services(Special Agencies)(Northern Ireland) Order 1990 (S.I. 1990/247)
- Outer Space Act 1986 (Guernsey) Order 1990 (S.I. 1990/248)
- Security Service Act 1989 (Channel Islands) Order 1990 (S.I. 1990/249)
- Naval, Military and Air Forces etc. (Disablement and Death) Service Pensions Amendment Order 1990 (S.I. 1990/250)
- Collision Regulations (Seaplanes) (Amendment) Order 1990 (S.I. 1990/251)
- Collision Regulations (Seaplanes) (Guernsey) Order 1990 (S.I. 1990/252)
- Mersey Channel (Collision Rules) (Amendment) Order 1990 (S.I. 1990/253)
- River Hull (Navigation) Rules (Amendment) Order 1990 (S.I. 1990/254)
- Guaranteed Minimum Pensions Increase Order 1990 (S.I. 1990/255)
- Social Security (Industrial Injuries) (Regular Employment) Regulations 1990 (S.I. 1990/256)
- Statutory Sick Pay (Rate of Payment) Regulations 1990 (S.I. 1990/257)
- The Stroud (Parishes) Order 1990 S.I. 1990/260
- Scottish Local Elections Amendment Rules 1990 (S.I. 1990/262)
- Electricity (Non-Fossil Fuel Sources) (England and Wales) Order 1990 (S.I. 1990/263)
- Electricity Act 1989 (Modifications of Section 32(5) to (8)) Regulations 1990 (S.I. 1990/264)
- Electricity (Imported Capacity) Regulations 1990 (S.I. 1990/265)
- Fossil Fuel Levy Regulations 1990 (S.I. 1990/266)
- Area Boards (Payments for Use of Tax Losses) Order 1990 (S.I. 1990/267)
- Local Government Finance (Capital Money) (Consequential Amendments) Order 1990 (S.I. 1990/268)
- M1 London – Yorkshire Motorway (The North of Edgware Bury – Aldenham Special Roads Scheme 1962) (Partial Revocation) Scheme 1990 (S.I. 1990/269)
- General Optical Council (Registration and Enrolment (Amendment) Rules) Order of Council 1990 (S.I. 1990/270)
- Hampshire (District Boundaries) Order 1990 (S.I. 1990/274)
- Education (Grants for Training of Teachers and Community Education Workers) (Scotland) Regulations 1990 (S.I. 1990/277)
- Co-operative Development Agency (Winding Up and Dissolution) Order 1990 (S.I. 1990/279)
- A41 London–Birmingham Trunk Road (Berkhamsted Bypass) Order 1985 Amendment Order and New Trunk Roads Order 1990 (S.I. 1990/283)
- A41 London–Birmingham Trunk Road (East of Bourne End to South of Kings Langley) Detrunking Order 1990 (S.I. 1990/284)
- A41 LondonBirmingham Trunk Road (East of Tring to East of Bourne End, Berkhamsted) Detrunking Order 1990 (S.I. 1990/285)
- A41 London – Birmingham Trunk Road (Kings Langley Bypass) Order 1985 Amendment Order and New Trunk Roads Order 1990 (S.I. 1990/286)
- Personal Community Charge (Relief) (Wales) Regulations 1990 (S.I. 1990/288)
- (A500) Hanford-Etruria Principal Road (Trunking) and (A34) Winchester-Preston Trunk Road (De-trunking from Hanford to Talke) Order 1990 (S.I. 1990/289)
- Firearms (Variation of Fees) Order 1990 (S.I. 1990/290)
- Petty Sessional Divisions (Avon) Order 1990 (S.I. 1990/291)
- Community Charges and Non-Domestic Rating (Demand Notices) (Wales) Regulations 1990 (S.I. 1990/293)
- Borders and Lothian Regions and Tweeddale and Midlothian Districts (Carlops) Boundaries Amendment Order 1990 (S.I. 1990/294) (S. 27)
- Schools (Safety and Supervision of Pupils) (Scotland) Regulations 1990 (S.I. 1990/295)
- Borders Regional Council (Galashiels Mill Lade) (Amendment) Water Order 1990 (S.I. 1990/296)

== 301–400 ==
- Petty Sessional Divisions (Hertfordshire) Order 1990 (S.I. 1990/303)
- Dangerous Substances (Notification and Marking of Sites) Regulations 1990 (S.I. 1990/304)
- Potteries etc. (Modifications) Regulations 1990 (S.I. 1990/305)
- Education (Grants) (Travellers and Displaced Persons) Regulations 1990 (S.I. 1990/306)
- Census Regulations 1990 (S.I. 1990/307)
- Hill Livestock (Compensatory Allowances) (Amendment) Regulations 1990 (S.I. 1990/308)
- Diseases of Animals (Approved Disinfectants) (Amendment) Order 1990 (S.I. 1990/309)
- Data Protection (Regulation of Financial Services etc.) (Subject Access Exemption) (Amendment) Order 1990 (S.I. 1990/310)
- Common Land (Rectification of Registers) Regulations 1990 (S.I. 1990/311)
- Social Security Act 1989 (Commencement No. 4) Order 1990 (S.I. 1990/312)
- Education (Inner London Education Authority) (Property Transfer) (Amendment) Order 1990 (S.I. 1990/313)
- Land Registration Rules 1990 (S.I. 1990/314)
- Value Added Tax (Cars) (Amendment) Order 1990 (S.I. 1990/315)
- Local Authorities (Capital Finance) (Rate of Discount) Regulations 1990 (S.I. 1990/316)
- Road Vehicles (Construction and Use) (Amendment) Regulations 1990 (S.I. 1990/317)
- Electricity Supply Pension Scheme (Transfer Date Amendments) Regulations 1990 (S.I. 1990/318)
- Smoke Control Areas (Authorised Fuels) Regulations 1990 (S.I. 1990/319)
- Social Security Benefits Up-rating Order 1990 (S.I. 1990/320)
- Social Security (Contributions) (Re-rating) Order 1990 (S.I. 1990/321)
- Social Security (Recoupment) Regulations 1990, S.I. 1990/322)
- Land Charges (Fees) Order 1990 (S.I. 1990/323)
- Caithness Salmon Fishery District Designation Order 1990 (S.I. 1990/324)
- Firearms (Variation of Fees) (Scotland) Order 1990 (S.I. 1990/325)
- Census (Scotland) Regulations 1990 (S.I. 1990/326)
- Land Charges Fees Rules 1990 (S.I. 1990/327)
- The Shepway (Parishes) Order 1990 S.I. 1990/329
- Local Government Act 1988 (Defined Activities) (Exemption) (England) Order 1990 (S.I. 1990/333)
- Fixed Penalty (Increase) Order 1990 (S.I. 1990/334)
- Fixed Penalty Offences Order 1990 (S.I. 1990/335)
- Magistrates' Courts (Witnesses' Addresses) Rules 1990 (S.I. 1990/336)
- River Ness Salmon Fishery District (Baits and Lures) Regulations 1990 (S.I. 1990/337)
- Certification Officer (Amendment of Fees) Regulations 1990 (S.I. 1990/339)
- City of London (Non-Domestic Rating Multiplier) Order 1990 (S.I. 1990/340)
- Smoke Control Areas (Exempted Fireplaces) Order 1990 (S.I. 1990/345)
- Electricity (Protected Persons) (England and Wales) Pension Regulations 1990 (S.I. 1990/346)
- Poultry Breeding Flocks and Hatcheries (Registration and Testing) (Amendment) Order 1990 (S.I. 1990/347)
- Poultry Laying Flocks (Testing and Registration etc.) (Amendment) Order 1990 (S.I. 1990/348)
- Financial Services Act 1986 (Restriction of Scope of Act and Meaning of Collective Investment Scheme) Order 1990 (S.I. 1990/349)
- Public Telecommunication System Designation (Norwich Cablevision Ltd) Order 1990 (S.I. 1990/350)
- Building Societies (Designation of Qualifying Bodies) (Amendment) Order 1990 (S.I. 1990/351)
- Building Societies (Designation of Qualifying Bodies) (Amendment) (No 2) Order 1990 (S.I. 1990/352)
- Education (School Financial Statements) (Prescribed Particulars etc.) Regulations 1990 (S.I. 1990/353)
- Companies Act 1989 (Commencement No. 3, Transitional Provisions and Transfer of Functions under the Financial Services Act 1986) Order 1990 (S.I. 1990/354)
- Companies Act 1989 (Commencement No. 4 and Transitional and Saving Provisions) Order 1990 (S.I. 1990/355)
- Central and Tayside Regions and Stirling and Perth and Kinross Districts (Loch Earn/Loch Tay) Boundaries Amendment Order 1990 (S.I. 1990/356) (S. 34)
- Public Telecommunication System Designation (United Cable Television (London South) Plc) (Merton & Sutton) Order 1990 (S.I. 1990/357)
- A339 Basingstoke to Newbury Trunk Road (Basingstoke Northern Bypass Trunking and Detrunking) Order 1990 (S.I. 1990/358)
- Blood Tests (Evidence of Paternity) (Amendment) Regulations 1990 (S.I. 1990/359)
- Education (Areas to which Pupils and Students Belong) (Amendment) Regulations 1990 (S.I. 1990/361)
- Education (Inner London Education Authority) (Horniman and Geffrye Museums) (Transfer of Functions) Order 1990 (S.I. 1990/362)
- Landlord and Tenant Act 1954 (Appropriate Multiplier) Order 1990 (S.I. 1990/363)
- Merchant Shipping (Light Dues) Regulations 1990 (S.I. 1990/364)
- Merchant Shipping (Load Lines) (Exemption) (Amendment) Order 1990 (S.I. 1990/365)
- Community Charges and Non-Domestic Rating (Demand Notices) (England) (Amendment) Regulations 1990 (S.I. 1990/366)
- Town and Country Planning (Assessment of Environmental Effects) (Amendment) Regulations 1990 (S.I. 1990/367)
- Lothian and Strathclyde Regions and West Lothian and Motherwell Districts (Westcraigs) Boundaries Amendment Order 1990 (S.I. 1990/368) (S. 35)
- Community Charges and Non-Domestic Rating (Demand Notices) (City of London) Regulations 1990 (S.I. 1990/369)
- Home Purchase Assistance (Winding Up of Scheme) Order 1990 (S.I. 1990/374)
- A663 Broadway (A627(M) to Manchester City Boundary) (Trunking) Order 1990 (S.I. 1990/375)
- Act of Sederunt (Fees of Messengers-at-Arms) 1990 (S.I. 1990/379)
- Act of Sederunt (Copyright, Designs and Patents) 1990 (S.I. 1990/380)
- Act of Sederunt (Fees of Sheriff Officers) 1990 (S.I. 1990/381)
- National Health Service (Superannuation) (Scotland) Amendment Regulations 1990 (S.I. 1990/382)
- Teachers' Superannuation (Scotland) Amendment Regulations 1990 (S.I. 1990/383)
- Employment Protection (Variation of Limits) Order 1990 (S.I. 1990/384)
- Sugar Beet (Research and Education) Order 1990 (S.I. 1990/385)
- Gaming Act (Variation of Fees) Order 1990 (S.I. 1990/386)
- Lotteries (Gaming Board Fees) Order 1990 (S.I. 1990/387)
- Assistance for Minor Works to Dwellings Regulations 1990 (S.I. 1990/388)
- Electricity Supply (Amendment) Regulations 1990 (S.I. 1990/390)
- Education Reform Act 1988 (Commencement No. 8 and Amendment) Order 1990 (S.I. 1990/391)
- Electricity Act 1989 (Requirement of Consent for Hydro-electric Generating Stations) (Scotland) Order 1990 (S.I. 1990/392)
- Electricity Act 1989 (Modification of Local Enactments) (Scotland) Order 1990 (S.I. 1990/393)
- Electricity Act 1989 (Scottish Nuclear Limited) Extinguishment of Loans Order 1990 (S.I. 1990/394)
- Potassium Bromate (Prohibition as a Flour Improver) (Scotland) Regulations 1990 (S.I. 1990/395)
- Rent Officers (Additional Functions) (Scotland) Order 1990 (S.I. 1990/396)
- Gaming Act (Variation of Fees) (Scotland) Order 1990 (S.I. 1990/397)
- City of Edinburgh, East Lothian and Midlothian Districts (Whitehill Mains) Boundaries Amendment Order 1990 (S.I. 1990/398) (S. 47)
- Potassium Bromate (Prohibition as a Flour Improver) Regulations 1990 (S.I. 1990/399)
- Immigration (Registration with Police) (Amendment) Regulations 1990 (S.I. 1990/400)

== 401–500 ==
- Police (Amendment) Regulations 1990 (S.I. 1990/401)
- Personal Community Charge (Relief) (England) (Amendment) Regulations 1990 (S.I. 1990/402)
- Local Government Act 1988 (Defined Activities) (Exemptions) (England) (No. 2) Order 1990 (S.I. 1990/403)
- Local Authorities (Capital Finance) (Prescribed Bodies) Regulations 1990 (S.I. 1990/404)
- London Residuary Body (Transfer of Property etc.) Order 1990 (S.I. 1990/419)
- Value Added Tax (Cash Accounting) (Amendment) Regulations 1990 (S.I. 1990/420)
- Personal Community Charge (Relief) (Scotland) Regulations 1990 (S.I. 1990/421)
- Local Government Superannuation (Scotland) Amendment Regulations 1990 (S.I. 1990/422)
- Education (National Curriculum) (Attainment Targets and Programmes of Study in English) (No. 2) Order 1990 (S.I. 1990/423)
- Education (National Curriculum) (Attainment Targets and Programmes of Study in Technology) Order 1990 (S.I. 1990/424)
- Oil Pollution (Compulsory Insurance) (Amendment) Regulations 1990 (S.I. 1990/425)
- Local Authorities (Capital Finance) (Approved Investments) Regulations 1990 (S.I. 1990/426)
- Rent Assessment Committees (England and Wales) (Amendment) Regulations 1990 (S.I. 1990/427)
- Rent Officers (Additional Functions) Order 1990 (S.I. 1990/428)
- Local Government and Housing Act 1989 (Commencement No. 5 and Transitional Provisions) Order 1990 (S.I. 1990/431)
- Local Authorities (Capital Finance) Regulations 1990 (S.I. 1990/432)
- Local Authorities (Goods and Services) (Public Bodies) Order 1990 (S.I. 1990/433)
- References to Rating (Housing) Regulations 1990 (S.I. 1990/434)
- Accounts and Audit (Amendment) Regulations 1990 (S.I. 1990/435)
- Companies (Unregistered Companies) (Amendment) Regulations 1990 (S.I. 1990/438)
- Insolvency Practitioners Regulations 1990 (S.I. 1990/439)
- Oversea Companies (Accounts) (Modifications and Exemptions) Order 1990 (S.I. 1990/440)
- Lyon Court and Office Fees (Variation) Order 1990 (S.I. 1990/441)
- Electricity and Pipe-line Works (Assessment of Environmental Effects) Regulations 1990 (S.I. 1990/442)
- Offshore Generating Stations (Exemption) Order 1990 (S.I. 1990/443)
- Housing (Prescribed Forms) Regulations 1990 (S.I. 1990/447)
- Goods Vehicles (Plating and Testing) (Amendment) Regulations 1990 (S.I. 1990/448)
- Motor Vehicles (Tests) (Amendment) Regulations 1990 (S.I. 1990/449)
- Public Service Vehicles (Conditions of Fitness, Equipment, Use and Certification) (Amendment) Regulations 1990 (S.I. 1990/450)
- Horticultural Development Council (Amendment) Order 1990 (S.I. 1990/454)
- Electricity (Applications for Consent) Regulations 1990 (S.I. 1990/455)
- New Towns (Defects Grants) (Payments to District Councils) (Extensions of Time) Order 1990 (S.I. 1990/456)
- Town and Country Planning General Development (Amendment) Order 1990 (S.I. 1990/457)
- Civil Aviation (Navigation Services Charges) (Fifth Amendment) Regulations 1990 (S.I. 1990/458)
- Police (Grant) (Amendment) Order 1990 (S.I. 1990/459)
- Wireless Telegraphy (Broadcast Licence Charges and Exemption) (Amendment) Regulations 1990 (S.I. 1990/460)
- Motor Vehicles (Type Approval and Approval Marks) (Fees) Regulations 1990 (S.I. 1990/461)
- Personal Community Charge (Exemption for the Severely Mentally Impaired) Order 1990 (S.I. 1990/462)
- M3 Motorway (Bar End-Compton Section) Scheme 1990 (S.I. 1990/463)
- M3 Motorway (Bar End—Compton Section) Connecting Roads Scheme 1990 (S.I. 1990/464)
- Town and Country Planning (Blight Provisions) Order 1990 (S.I. 1990/465)
- Fixed Penalty Offences (Scotland) Order 1990 (S.I. 1990/466)
- Fixed Penalty (Increase) (Scotland) Order 1990 (S.I. 1990/467)
- National Health Service (Charges for Drugs and Appliances) (Scotland) Amendment Regulations 1990 (S.I. 1990/468)
- Police (Scotland) Amendment Regulations 1990 (S.I. 1990/469)
- High Court of Justiciary Fees Amendment Order 1990 (S.I. 1990/470)
- Legal Aid (Scotland) (Fees in Civil Proceedings) Amendment Regulations 1990 (S.I. 1990/471)
- Sheriff Court Fees Amendment Order 1990 (S.I. 1990/472)
- Civil Legal Aid (Scotland) (Fees) Amendment Regulations 1990 (S.I. 1990/473)
- Criminal Legal Aid (Scotland) (Fees) Amendment Regulations 1990 (S.I. 1990/474)
- Scottish Land Court (Fees) Order 1990 (S.I. 1990/475)
- Court of Session etc. Fees Amendment Order 1990 (S.I. 1990/476)
- Lands Tribunal for Scotland (Amendment) (Fees) Rules 1990 (S.I. 1990/477)
- Measuring Instruments (EEC Requirements) (Fees) (Amendment) Regulations 1990 (S.I. 1990/478)
- Industrial Tribunals (Interest) Order 1990 (S.I. 1990/479)
- Education (Inner London Education Authority) (Schools Designation) (No. 2) Order 1990 (S.I. 1990/480)
- Education (Gloucestershire College of Arts and Technology (Higher Education) Higher Education Corporation) (Dissolution) Order 1990 (S.I. 1990/481)
- Education (Harrow College of Higher Education Higher Education Corporation) (Dissolution) Order 1990 (S.I. 1990/482)
- Pensions Increase (Review) Order 1990 (S.I. 1990/483)
- Civil Legal Aid (Assessment of Resources) (Amendment) Regulations 1990 (S.I. 1990/484)
- Land Charges (Amendment) Rules 1990 (S.I. 1990/485)
- Legal Advice and Assistance (Amendment) Regulations 1990 (S.I. 1990/486)
- Legal Advice and Assistance at Police Stations (Remuneration) (Amendment) Regulations 1990 (S.I. 1990/487)
- Legal Aid in Criminal and Care Proceedings (Costs) (Amendment) Regulations 1990 (S.I. 1990/488)
- Legal Aid in Criminal and Care Proceedings (General) (Amendment) Regulations 1990 (S.I. 1990/489)
- Matrimonial Causes (Costs) (Amendment) Rules 1990 (S.I. 1990/490)
- Register of County Court Judgments (Amendment) Regulations 1990 (S.I. 1990/491)
- Rules of the Supreme Court (Amendment) 1990 (S.I. 1990/492)
- Local Government Finance (Payments) (English Authorities) Regulations 1990 (S.I. 1990/493)
- Electricity (Non-Fossil Fuel Sources) (England and Wales) (Amendment) Order 1990 (S.I. 1990/494)
- National Health Service (Optical Charges and Payments) Amendment Regulations 1990 (S.I. 1990/495)
- Local Government, Reorganisation (Capital Money) (West Yorkshire) (Amendment) Order 1990 (S.I. 1990/496)
- Compulsory Purchase of Land (Vesting Declarations) Regulations 1990 (S.I. 1990/497)
- National Assistance (Charges for Accommodation) Amendment Regulations 1990 (S.I. 1990/498)

== 501–600 ==
- Merger (Prenotification) Regulations 1990 (S.I. 1990/501)
- Central Rating Lists (Amendment) Regulations 1990 (S.I. 1990/502)
- Local Government Superannuation (Funds etc.) Regulations 1990 (S.I. 1990/503)
- Sea Fish Licensing (Variation) Order 1990 (S.I. 1990/504)
- Valuation for Rating (Decapitalisation Rate) (Scotland) Regulations 1990 (S.I. 1990/505)
- Electricity Act 1989 (North of Scotland Specified Area) Order 1990 (S.I. 1990/506)
- Town and Country Planning (Appeals) (Written Submissions Procedure) (Scotland) Regulations 1990 (S.I. 1990/507)
- Town and Country Planning (General Development) (Scotland) Amendment Order 1990 (S.I. 1990/508)
- National Health Service (Optical Charges and Payments) (Scotland) Amendment Regulations 1990 (S.I. 1990/509)
- Electricity (Protected Persons) (Scotland) Pension Regulations 1990 (S.I. 1990/510)
- Housing and Planning Act 1986 (Commencement No. 14) Order 1990 (S.I. 1990/511)
- Compulsory Purchase by Non-Ministerial Acquiring Authorities (Inquiries Procedure) Rules 1990 (S.I. 1990/512)
- Education (Inner London Education Authority) (Staff Transfer) (No. 2) Order 1990 (S.I. 1990/513)
- Building Societies (Designation of Qualifying Bodies) (Amendment) (No 3) Order 1990 (S.I. 1990/514)
- Companies (Summary Financial Statement) Regulations 1990 (S.I. 1990/515)
- County Court (Amendment) Rules 1990 (S.I. 1990/516)
- County Court (Forms) (Amendment) Rules 1990 (S.I. 1990/517)
- Court Funds (Amendment) Rules 1990 (S.I. 1990/518)
- Representation of the People Act 1989 (Commencement No. 2) Order 1990 (S.I. 1990/519)
- Representation of the People (Amendment) Regulations 1990 (S.I. 1990/520)
- Local Government Reorganisation (Superannuation and Compensation) Regulations 1990 (S.I. 1990/521)
- Foreign Marriage (Amendment) Act 1988 (Commencement) Order 1990 (S.I. 1990/522)
- Finance Act 1985 (Interest on Tax) (Prescribed Rate) Order 1990 (S.I. 1990/523)
- Isles of Scilly (Water and Sewerage) (Miscellaneous Provisions) Order 1990 (S.I. 1990/524)
- Local Government Finance (Garden Squares) (Consequential Amendments) Order 1990 (S.I. 1990/525)
- Electricity Act 1989 (Consequential Modifications of Subordinate Legislation) Order 1990 (S.I. 1990/526)
- Electricity (Connection Charges) Regulations 1990 (S.I. 1990/527)
- Electricity Generating Stations and Overhead Lines (Inquiries Procedure) Rules 1990 (S.I. 1990/528)
- Local Authorities (Discretionary Expenditure Limits) Order 1990 (S.I. 1990/529)
- Poultry Flocks, Hatcheries and Processed Animal Protein (Fees) Order 1990 (S.I. 1990/530)
- Justices of the Peace Act 1979 (Amendment) Order 1990 (S.I. 1990/531)
- Education (Governing Bodies of Institutions of Higher and Further Education) Regulations 1990 (S.I. 1990/532)
- Community Charge Benefits (Permitted Total) Order 1990 (S.I. 1990/533)
- Housing Benefit (Permitted Totals) Order 1990 (S.I. 1990/534)
- Personal Injuries (Civilians) Amendment Scheme 1990 (S.I. 1990/535)
- Social Security (Refunds) (Repayment of Contractual Maternity Pay) Regulations 1990 (S.I. 1990/536)
- National Health Service (Charges for Drugs and Appliances) Amendment Regulations 1990 (S.I. 1990/537)
- National Health Service (Service Committees and Tribunal) Amendment Regulations 1990 (S.I. 1990/538)
- Industrial Assurance (Fees) Regulations 1990 (S.I. 1990/539)
- Building Societies (General Charge and Fees) Regulations 1990 (S.I. 1990/540)
- Friendly Societies (Fees) Regulations 1990 (S.I. 1990/541)
- Industrial and Provident Societies (Amendment of Fees) Regulations 1990 (S.I. 1990/542)
- Industrial and Provident Societies (Credit Unions) (Amendment of Fees) Regulations 1990 (S.I. 1990/543)
- Tobacco Products Regulations 1979 (Amendment) Regulations 1990 (S.I. 1990/544)
- Community Charges (Deductions from Income Support) (No. 2) Regulations 1990 (S.I. 1990/545)
- Housing Benefit (General) Amendment Regulations 1990 (S.I. 1990/546)
- Income Support (General) Amendment Regulations 1990 (S.I. 1990/547)
- National Health Service (Travelling Expenses and Remission of Charges) Amendment Regulations 1990 (S.I. 1990/548)
- Education (Grant-maintained Schools) (Finance) Regulations 1990 (S.I. 1990/549)
- Insurance (Fees) Regulations 1990 (S.I. 1990/550)
- National Health Service (Travelling Expenses and Remission of Charges) (Scotland) Amendment Regulations 1990 (S.I. 1990/551)
- Transport (Scotland) Act 1989 (Transfer of Shipping Companies) Appointed Day Order 1990 (S.I. 1990/552)
- Reserve Forces Act 1980 (Constitution of Associations) Order 1990 (S.I. 1990/553)
- Local Government Reorganisation (Capital Money) (Greater London) Order 1990 (S.I. 1990/554)
- Merchant Shipping (Fees) Regulations 1990 (S.I. 1990/555)
- Control of Asbestos in the Air Regulations 1990 (S.I. 1990/556)
- Industrial Training Levy (Construction Board) Order 1990 (S.I. 1990/557)
- Industrial Training Levy (Engineering Board) Order 1990 (S.I. 1990/558)
- Bankruptcy and Companies (Department of Trade and Industry) Fees (Amendment) Order 1990 (S.I. 1990/559)
- Insolvency Fees (Amendment) Order 1990 (S.I. 1990/560)
- Representation of the People (Northern Ireland) (Amendment) Regulations 1990 (S.I. 1990/561)
- European Parliamentary Elections (Northern Ireland) (Amendment) Regulations 1990 (S.I. 1990/562)
- Town and Country Planning (Fees for Applications and Deemed Applications)(Scotland) Regulations 1990 (S.I. 1990/563)
- General Drainage Charges (Forms) Regulations 1990 (S.I. 1990/564)
- Medicines (Exemption from Licences) (Wholesale Dealing) Order 1990 (S.I. 1990/566)
- Medicines (Exemptions from Licences) (Intermediate Medicated Feeding Stuffs) (Amendment) Order 1990 (S.I. 1990/567)
- Medicines (Veterinary Drugs) (Pharmacy and Merchants' List) (No.2) (Amendment) Order 1990 (S.I. 1990/568)
- Welfare Food Amendment (No. 2) Regulations 1990 (S.I. 1990/571)
- Companies (Forms) (Amendment) Regulations 1990 (S.I. 1990/572)
- Local Government Finance Act 1988 Commencement (Scotland) Amendment Order 1990 (S.I. 1990/573)
- Family Credit (General) Amendment Regulations 1990 (S.I. 1990/574)
- The Crewe and Nantwich (Parishes) Order 1990 S.I. 1990/576
- Electricity Act 1989 (Consequential Modifications of Enactments) Order 1990 (S.I. 1990/577)
- Social Fund (Miscellaneous Amendments) Regulations 1990 (S.I. 1990/580)
- Social Security (Attendance Allowance) Amendment Regulations 1990 (S.I. 1990/581)
- Non-Domestic Rating (Alteration of Lists and Appeals) Regulations 1990 (S.I. 1990/582)
- Renfrew and City of Glasgow Districts (Atholl Crescent, Southwold Road, Rosshall, Bullwood and Hurlet) Boundaries Amendment Order 1990 (S.I. 1990/584) (S. 74)
- Occupational Pension Schemes (Additional Voluntary Contributions) (Amendment) Regulations 1990 (S.I. 1990/585)
- Retirement Benefits Schemes (Tax Relief on Contributions) (Disapplication of Earnings Cap) Regulations 1990 (S.I. 1990/586)
- Anguilla Constitution (Amendment) Order 1990 (S.I. 1990/587)
- Copyright (Hong Kong) (Amendment) Order 1990 (S.I. 1990/588)
- Foreign Compensation (Financial Provisions) Order 1990 (S.I. 1990/589)
- Merchant Shipping (Liner Conferences) (Hong Kong) (Amendment) Order 1990 (S.I. 1990/590)
- Outer Space Act 1986 (Hong Kong) Order 1990 (S.I. 1990/591)
- Appropriation(Northern Ireland) Order 1990 (S.I. 1990/592)
- Companies (Northern Ireland) Order 1990 (S.I. 1990/593)
- Licensing (Northern Ireland) Order 1990 (S.I. 1990/594)
- Local Elections (Northern Ireland) (Amendment) Order 1990 (S.I. 1990/595)
- Outer Space Act 1986 (Isle of Man) Order 1990 (S.I. 1990/596)
- Outer Space Act 1986 (Jersey) Order 1990 (S.I. 1990/597)
- Foreign Marriage (Amendment) Order 1990 (S.I. 1990/598)
- Foreign Marriage (Armed Forces) (Amendment) Order 1990 (S.I. 1990/599)
- European Communities (Designation) Order 1990 (S.I. 1990/600)

== 601–700 ==
- Employment Code of Practice (Trade Union Ballots on Industrial Action) Order 1990 (S.I. 1990/601)
- Local Authorities (Discretionary Expenditure) (Relevant Population) Regulations 1990 (S.I. 1990/602)
- Social Security (Adjudication) Amendment Regulations 1990 (S.I. 1990/603)
- Social Security (Contributions) Amendment Regulations 1990 (S.I. 1990/604)
- Social Security (Contributions) Amendment (No. 2) Regulations 1990 (S.I. 1990/605)
- Social Security (Contributions) (Re-rating) Consequential Amendment Regulations 1990 (S.I. 1990/606)
- Milk and Milk Products (Protection of Designations) Regulations 1990 (S.I. 1990/607)
- Non-Domestic Rating (Transitional Period) Regulations 1990 (S.I. 1990/608)
- Local Government Finance (Payments) (Welsh Authorities) Regulations 1990 (S.I. 1990/609)
- Seeds (Fees) (Amendment) Regulations 1990 (S.I. 1990/610)
- Seeds (Registration, Licensing and Enforcement) (Amendment) Regulations 1990 (S.I. 1990/611)
- National Assistance (Charges for Accommodation) (Scotland) Regulations 1990 (S.I. 1990/612)
- Compulsory Purchase of Land Regulations 1990 (S.I. 1990/613)
- Housing and Planning Act 1986 (Commencement No. 15) Order 1990 (S.I. 1990/614)
- Langstone Harbour Revision Order 1990 (S.I. 1990/615)
- Diseases of Fish (Amendment of Definition of Infected) Order 1990 (S.I. 1990/616)
- Seeds (National Lists of Varieties) (Fees) Regulations 1990 (S.I. 1990/617)
- Plant Breeders' Rights (Fees) Regulations 1990 (S.I. 1990/618)
- Social Security (Industrial Injuries) (Dependency) (Permitted Earnings Limits) Order 1990 (S.I. 1990/619)
- Social Security (Invalid Care Allowance)Amendment Regulations 1990 (S.I. 1990/620)
- Social Security Benefit (Persons Abroad) Amendment (No. 2) Regulations 1990 (S.I. 1990/621)
- Statutory Maternity Pay (General) Amendment Regulations 1990 (S.I. 1990/622)
- Vaccine Damage Payments (Specified Disease) Order 1990 (S.I. 1990/623)
- Industrial Training Levy (Clothing and AlliedProducts) Order 1990 (S.I. 1990/624)
- Personal Community Charge (Relief) (Scotland) Amendment Regulations 1990 (S.I. 1990/625)
- Income Tax (Purchased Life Annuities) (Amendment) Regulations 1990 (S.I. 1990/626)
- Lloyd's Underwriters (Tax) (1987–88) Regulations 1990 (S.I. 1990/627)
- Motor Vehicles (Tests) (Amendment) (No. 2) Regulations 1990 (S.I. 1990/628)
- Representation of the People (Scotland) Amendment Regulations 1990 (S.I. 1990/629)
- Abolition of Domestic Rates (Domestic and Part Residential Subjects) (Scotland) Regulations 1990 (S.I. 1990/630)
- Civil Legal Aid (Scotland) Amendment Regulations 1990 (S.I. 1990/631)
- Advice and Assistance (Scotland) Amendment Regulations 1990 (S.I. 1990/632)
- Prevention of Terrorism (Temporary Provisions) Act 1989 (Continuance) Order 1990 (S.I. 1990/633)
- Social Security Benefits Up-rating Regulations 1990 (S.I. 1990/645)
- Unitary Development Plans (Greater London, Bradford and Barnsley) (Appointed Day) Order 1990 (S.I. 1990/652)
- Merchant Shipping (Passenger Counting and Recording Systems) Regulations 1990 (S.I. 1990/659)
- Merchant Shipping (Emergency Information for Passengers) Regulations 1990 (S.I. 1990/660)
- Act of Sederunt (Amendment of Sheriff Court Ordinary Cause, Summary Cause, and Small Claim, Rules) 1990 (S.I. 1990/661)
- Northern Police (Amalgamation) Amendment (No. 2) Scheme Order 1990 (S.I. 1990/662)
- Northern Combined Fire Area Administration (Amendment) (No.3) Scheme Order 1990 (S.I. 1990/663)
- Dairy Produce Quotas (Amendment) (No. 2) Regulations 1990 (S.I. 1990/664)
- Income-Related Benefits (Miscellaneous Amendments) Regulations 1990 (S.I. 1990/671)
- Mobility Allowance Amendment Regulations 1990 (S.I. 1990/672)
- Non-Domestic Rating (Caravan Sites) Regulations 1990 (S.I. 1990/673)
- Maentwrog—Bettws-y-Coed—East of Conway TrunkRoad (Llanrwst By-Pass and Other Diversions) (Part Revocation) Order 1990 (S.I. 1990/674)
- Northern Ireland (Emergency and Prevention of Terrorism Provisions) (Continuance) Order 1990 (S.I. 1990/675)
- Cable (Excepted Programmes) Order 1990 (S.I. 1990/676)
- Income Tax (Indexation) Order 1990 (S.I. 1990/677)
- Personal Equity Plan (Amendment) Regulations 1990 (S.I. 1990/678)
- Retirement Benefits Schemes (Indexationof Earnings Cap) Order 1990 (S.I. 1990/679)
- Inheritance Tax (Indexation) Order 1990 (S.I. 1990/680)
- Capital Gains Tax (Annual Exempt Amount) Order 1990 (S.I. 1990/681)
- Value Added Tax (Increase of Registration Limits) Order 1990 (S.I. 1990/682)
- Electrical Luminous Tube Signs (Scotland) Regulations 1990 (S.I. 1990/683)
- Community Charges (Levying, Collection and Payment) (Scotland) Amendment Regulations 1990 (S.I. 1990/684)
- Fishing Vessels (Acquisition and Improvement) (Grants) (Amendment) Scheme 1990 (S.I. 1990/685)
- Gas (Meters) (Variation of Fees) Regulations 1990 (S.I. 1990/686)
- European Parliamentary Elections (Amendment) Regulations 1990 (S.I. 1990/687)
- Workmen's Compensation (Supplementation) Amendment Scheme 1990 (S.I. 1990/688)
- Football Spectators Act 1989 (Commencement No. 1) Order 1990 (S.I. 1990/690)
- Returning Officers' Expenses Regulations 1990 (S.I. 1990/691)
- Financial Services Act 1986 (Listed Money Market Institutions and Miscellaneous Exemptions) Order 1990 (S.I. 1990/696)

== 701–800 ==
- References to Rating (Housing) (Amendment) Regulations 1990 (S.I. 1990/701)
- Public Trustee (Fees) (Amendment) Order 1990 (S.I. 1990/702)
- Highways (Road Humps) Regulations 1990 (S.I. 1990/703)
- Traffic Signs (Amendment) Regulations 1990 and the Traffic Signs (Amendment) General Directions 1990 (S.I. 1990/704)
- Act of Sederunt (Rules of the Court of Session Amendment No.1) (Miscellaneous) 1990 (S.I. 1990/705)
- Rate Support Grant (Scotland) Order 1990 (S.I. 1990/706)
- Offshore Installations (Life-saving Appliances and Fire-fighting Equipment) (Amendment) Regulations 1990 (S.I. 1990/707)
- Community Charges (Administration and Enforcement) (Amendment) Regulations 1990 (S.I. 1990/711)
- Personal Community Charge (Qualifying Courses of Education) Regulations 1990 (S.I. 1990/712)
- Companies Act 1989 (Commencement No. 5 and Transitional and Saving Provisions) Order 1990 (S.I. 1990/713)
- Isles of Scilly (Road Traffic Regulation) Order 1990 (S.I. 1990/714)
- Highland Regional Council (Loch Lannsaidh) Water Order 1990 (S.I. 1990/715)
- Act of Sederunt (Fees of Solicitors in the Sheriff Court) (Amendment) 1990 (S.I. 1990/716)
- Act of Sederunt (Rules of the Court of Session Amendment No.2) (Solicitors' Fees) 1990 (S.I. 1990/717)
- Act of Adjournal (Consolidation Amendment No. 1) (Drug Trafficking) 1990 (S.I. 1990/718)
- Public Airport Companies (Capital Finance) Order 1990 (S.I. 1990/719)
- Passenger Transport Executives (Capital Finance) Order 1990 (S.I. 1990/720)
- Social Security (Claims and Payments) Amendment Regulations 1990 (S.I. 1990/725)
- Football Spectators (Designation of Enforcing Authority) Order 1990 (S.I. 1990/730)
- Football Spectators (Designation of Football Matches in England and Wales) Order 1990 (S.I. 1990/731)
- Football Spectators (Designation of Football Matches outside England and Wales) Order 1990 (S.I. 1990/732)
- Sussex Police (Amalgamation) (Amendment) Order 1990 (S.I. 1990/733)
- Export of Goods (Control) (Amendment No. 2) Order 1990 (S.I. 1990/735)
- Devon and Cornwall Police (Amalgamation) (Amendment) Order 1990 (S.I. 1990/736)
- Dyfed-Powys Police (Amalgamation) (Amendment) Order 1990 (S.I. 1990/737)
- South Wales Police (Amalgamation) (Amendment) Order 1990 (S.I. 1990/738)
- Thames Valley Police (Amalgamation) (Amendment) Order 1990 (S.I. 1990/739)
- Education (The London Institute) (Designated Staff) Order 1990 (S.I. 1990/740)
- Public Telecommunication System Designation (Videotron London Limited) (Greenwich and Lewisham) Order 1990 (S.I. 1990/749)
- Value Added Tax (Charities) Order 1990 (S.I. 1990/750)
- Value Added Tax (Tour Operators) (Amendment) Order 1990 (S.I. 1990/751)
- Value Added Tax (Transport) Order 1990 (S.I. 1990/752)
- A614 Trunk Road (Bawtry to Austerfield Roundabout) (De-Trunking) Order 1990 (S.I. 1990/754)
- Superannuation (National Museums and Galleries on Merseyside) Order 1990 (S.I. 1990/757)
- Northern Ireland (Emergency Provisions) Act 1978 (Amendment) Order 1990 (S.I. 1990/758)
- Electricity (Restrictive Trade Practices Act 1976) (Exemptions) Order 1990 (S.I. 1990/759)
- Movement of Animals (Restrictions) Order 1990 (S.I. 1990/760)
- Local Government and Housing Act 1989 (Commencement No. 6 and Miscellaneous Provisions) Order 1990 (S.I. 1990/762)
- Local Government (Promotion of Economic Development) Regulations 1990 (S.I. 1990/763)
- Juvenile Courts (London) (Amendment) Order 1990 (S.I. 1990/766)
- Local Authorities (Borrowing) Regulations 1990 (S.I. 1990/767)
- Register of County Court Judgments (Amendment No. 2) Regulations 1990 (S.I. 1990/768)
- Non-Domestic Rating (Alteration of Lists and Appeals) (Amendment) Regulations 1990 (S.I. 1990/769)
- A12 Trunk Road (Eastern Avenue East, Havering) (Prohibition of Use of Gap in Central Reservation) Order 1990 (S.I. 1990/770)
- Combined Probation Areas (Gwent) Order 1990 (S.I. 1990/771)
- Education (Inner London Education Authority) (Property Transfer) (No. 2) Order 1990 (S.I. 1990/772)
- Education (Inner London Education Authority) (Transitional and Supplementary Provisions) Order 1990 (S.I. 1990/773)
- Education (Inner London Education Authority) (Transitional and Supplementary Provisions) (No. 2) Order 1990 (S.I. 1990/774)
- Education (Inner London Education Authority) (Repayment of Loans) Order 1990 (S.I. 1990/775)
- Local Government Finance (Repeals, Savings and Consequential Amendments) Order 1990 (S.I. 1990/776)
- General Rate Act 1967 and Related Provisions (Savings and Consequential Provision) Regulations 1990 (S.I. 1990/777)
- Local Authorities (Capital Finance) (Consequential Amendments) Order 1990 (S.I. 1990/778)
- Housing Corporation Advances (Increase of Limit) Order 1990 (S.I. 1990/779)
- The Wealden (Parishes) Order 1990 S.I. 1990/780
- Dairy Produce Quotas (Amendment) (No. 3) Regulations 1990 (S.I. 1990/784)
- Housing Benefit (Subsidy) Order 1990 (S.I. 1990/785)
- Regional Flood Defence Committees (Welsh Area) (Appointed Day) Order 1990 (S.I. 1990/786)
- National Health Service (Charges for Drugs and Appliances) (Scotland) Amendment (No.2) Regulations 1990 (S.I. 1990/787)
- Non-Domestic Rates (Levying) (Scotland) Regulations 1990 (S.I. 1990/788)
- Local Government (Promotion of Economic Development) (Amendment) Regulations 1990 (S.I. 1990/789)
- Meters (Approval of Pattern or Construction and Method of Installation) Regulations 1990 (S.I. 1990/791)
- Meters (Certification) Regulations 1990 (S.I. 1990/792)
- Sunderland (Castletown and Doxford Park) Enterprise Zones (Designation) Order 1990 (S.I. 1990/794)
- Sunderland (Hylton Riverside and Southwick) Enterprise Zone (Designation) Order 1990 (S.I. 1990/795)
- Education (Designated Institutions) (Amendment) Order 1990 (S.I. 1990/796)
- Housing and Planning Act 1986 (Commencement No. 16) Order 1990 (S.I. 1990/797)
- Act of Sederunt (Rules of the Court of Session Amendment No.2) (Shorthand Writers' Fees) 1990 (S.I. 1990/798)
- Act of Sederunt (Shorthand Writers' Fees) 1990 (S.I. 1990/799)
- Self-Governing Schools (Ballots and Publication of Proposals) (Scotland) Regulations 1990 (S.I. 1990/800)

== 801–900 ==
- National Health Service (General Medical and Pharmaceutical Services) Amendment Regulations 1990 (S.I. 1990/801)
- Road Traffic (Driver Licensing and Information Systems) Act 1989 (Commencement No. 2) Order 1990 (S.I. 1990/802)
- Town and Country Planning (Compensation for Restrictions on Mineral Working) (Amendment) Regulations 1990 Approved by both Houses of ParliamentS.I. 1990/803)
- Gas and Electricity Industries (Rateable Values) (Amendment) Order 1990 (S.I. 1990/804)
- Police Pensions (Amendment) Regulations 1990 (S.I. 1990/805)
- Combined Probation Areas (Avon) Order 1990 (S.I. 1990/806)
- Milk and Milk Products (Protection of Designations) (Scotland) Regulations 1990 (S.I. 1990/816)
- Docks and Harbours (Rateable Values) (Scotland) Order 1990 (S.I. 1990/817)
- Forth Ports Authority (Rateable Values) (Scotland) Order 1990 (S.I. 1990/818)
- Caledonian MacBrayne Limited (Rateable Values) (Scotland) Order 1990 (S.I. 1990/819)
- Industrial and Freight Transport (Rateable Values) (Scotland) Order 1990 (S.I. 1990/820)
- British Telecommunications plc. (Rateable Values) (Scotland) Order 1990 (S.I. 1990/821)
- British Alcan Primary and Recycling Ltd. (Rateable Values) (Scotland) Order 1990 (S.I. 1990/822)
- Mines and Quarries (Rateable Values) (Scotland) Order 1990 (S.I. 1990/823)
- Gas Safety (Installation and Use) (Amendment) Regulations 1990 (S.I. 1990/824)
- Pneumoconiosis etc. (Workers' Compensation) (Payment of Claims) (Amendment) Regulations 1990 (S.I. 1990/825)
- Redundancy Payments (Local Government) (Modification) (Amendment) Order 1990 (S.I. 1990/826)
- Combined Probation Areas (Gloucestershire) Order 1990 (S.I. 1990/829)
- Housing (Management of Houses in Multiple Occupation) Regulations 1990 (S.I. 1990/830)
- Authorities for London Post-Graduate Teaching Hospitals (Establishment and Constitution) Amendment Order 1990 (S.I. 1990/833)
- Community Charge Benefits (General) Amendment Regulations 1990 (S.I. 1990/834)
- Community Charge Benefits (General) Amendment No. 2 Regulations 1990 (S.I. 1990/835)
- Lochaber Power Company (Rateable Values) (Scotland) Order 1990 (S.I. 1990/836)
- British Gas plc. (Rateable Values) (Scotland) Order 1990 (S.I. 1990/837)
- Glasgow Underground (Rateable Values) (Scotland) Order 1990 (S.I. 1990/838)
- Civil Legal Aid (Financial Conditions) (Scotland) Regulations 1990 (S.I. 1990/839)
- Advice and Assistance (Financial Conditions) (Scotland) Regulations 1990 (S.I. 1990/840)
- Combined Probation Areas (North Yorkshire) Order 1990 (S.I. 1990/841)
- Motor Vehicles (Driving Licences) (Amendment) Regulations 1990 (S.I. 1990/842)
- Charities (Borough Lands Charity, Chippenham) Order 1990 (S.I. 1990/843)
- Combined Probation Areas (Hertfordshire) Order 1990 (S.I. 1990/844)
- Local Government Officers (Political Restrictions) Regulations 1990 (S.I. 1990/851)
- PARLIAMENT S.I. 1990/853)
- British Railways Board (Rateable Values) (Scotland) Order 1990 (S.I. 1990/854)
- British Waterways Board (Rateable Values) (Scotland) Order 1990 (S.I. 1990/855)
- Water Undertakings (Rateable Values) (Scotland) Order 1990 (S.I. 1990/856)
- Mercury Communications Ltd. (Rateable Values) (Scotland) Order 1990 (S.I. 1990/857)
- Business Expansion Scheme (Substitution of Permitted Maximum Amount) Order 1990 (S.I. 1990/862)
- Court of Protection (Enduring Powers of Attorney) (Amendment) Rules 1990 (S.I. 1990/864)
- Driver Information Systems (Exemption) Order 1990 (S.I. 1990/865)
- Merchant Shipping (Light Dues) (Amendment) Regulations 1990 (S.I. 1990/866)
- A12 Trunk Road (Leyton Way, Waltham Forest) (Prescribed Routes) Order 1990 (S.I. 1990/867)
- Thames Water Utilities Limited (Pipelaying and Other Works) (Code of Practice) Order 1990 (S.I. 1990/876)
- Copyright (Certification of Licensing Scheme for Educational Recording of Broadcasts) (Guild Sound and Vision Limited) Order 1990 (S.I. 1990/878)
- Copyright (Certification of Licensing Scheme for Educational Recording of Broadcasts and Cable Programmes) (Educational Recording Agency Limited) Order 1990 (S.I. 1990/879)
- Sludge (Use in Agriculture) (Amendment) Regulations 1990 (S.I. 1990/880)
- Town and Country Planning (Control of Advertisements) (Amendment) Regulations 1990 (S.I. 1990/881)
- Renfrew and City of Glasgow Districts (Atholl Crescent, Southwold Road, Rosshall, Bullwood and Hurlet) Boundaries Amendment (No. 2) Order 1990 (S.I. 1990/882) (S. 115)
- National Health Service (General Medical and Pharmaceutical Services) (Scotland) Amendment Regulations 1990 (S.I. 1990/883)
- Loch Moidart, North Channel Scallops Fishery Order 1990 (S.I. 1990/884)
- Skills Training Agency (Designation) (No. 1) Order 1990 (S.I. 1990/886)
- Fertilisers Regulations 1990 (S.I. 1990/887)
- Restrictive Trade Practices (Standards and Arrangements) Order 1990 (S.I. 1990/888)
- Wireless Telegraphy Apparatus (Approval) (Test Fees) Order 1990 (S.I. 1990/889)
- M42 Birmingham—Nottingham Motorway (Monkspath to Coleshill Section) and Connecting Roads Scheme (No. 2) 1978 (Revocation) Scheme 1990 (S.I. 1990/890)
- Pilotage Act 1987 (Hartlepool Pilots' Benefit Fund) Order 1990 (S.I. 1990/891)
- Merchant Shipping (Passenger Ship Construction and Survey) (Amendment) Regulations 1990 (S.I. 1990/892)
- Export of Goods (Control) (Amendment No. 3) Order 1990 (S.I. 1990/893)
- Offshore Installations (Safety Zones) (No. 2) Order 1990 (S.I. 1990/896)
- Offshore Installations (Safety Zones) (No: 3) Order 1990 (S.I. 1990/897)
- A23 Trunk Road (Purley Way, Croydon (Prescribed Routes) Order 1990 (S.I. 1990/899)

== 901–1000 ==
- National Health Service (Travelling Expenses and Remission of Charges) (Modification of Time Limit) (Scotland) Regulations 1990 (S.I. 1990/917)
- National Health Service (Travelling Expenses and Remission of Charges) (Modification of Time Limit) Regulations 1990 (S.I. 1990/918)
- Public Telecommunication System Designation (Bolton Telecable Ltd) Order 1990 (S.I. 1990/919)
- Public Telecommunication System Designation (Cable Haringey Ltd) Order 1990 (S.I. 1990/923)
- Public Telecommunication System Designation (Peterborough Cablevision Ltd) Order 1990 (S.I. 1990/924)
- Football Spectators Act 1989 (Commencement No. 2) Order 1990 (S.I. 1990/926)
- Guarantee Payments (Exemption) (No. 27) Order 1990 (S.I. 1990/927)
- Industrial Training (Transfer of the Activities of Establishment) Order 1990 (S.I. 1990/928)
- Skills Training Agency (Designation) (No. 2) Order 1990 (S.I. 1990/929)
- Local Elections (Principal Areas) (Declaration of Acceptance of Office) Order 1990 (S.I. 1990/932)
- Parking Act 1989 (Commencement) Order 1990 (S.I. 1990/933)
- Community Charges (Notices) (Substitute Charges) (England) Regulations 1990 (S.I. 1990/942)
- Milk Quota (Calculation of Standard Quota) (Scotland) Amendment Order 1990 (S.I. 1990/943)
- Crofters etc. Building Grants (Scotland) Regulations 1990 (S.I. 1990/944)
- Control of Pollution (Clyde River Purification Board Act 1972) Amendment Order 1990 (S.I. 1990/945)
- Injuries in War (Shore Employments) Compensation (Amendment) Scheme 1990 (S.I. 1990/946)
- Removal, Storage and Disposal of Vehicles (Prescribed Sums and Charges etc.) (Amendment) Regulations 1990 (S.I. 1990/955)
- Local Authorities (Councillors) (Declaration of Acceptance of Office) (Scotland) Order 1990 (S.I. 1990/956)
- County of Clwyd (Electoral Arrangements) Order 1990 (S.I. 1990/957)
- Seed Potatoes (Fees) Regulations 1990 (S.I. 1990/958)
- Local Government and Housing Act 1989 (Commencement No. 7) Order 1990 (S.I. 1990/961)
- London-Portsmouth Trunk Road A3 (Ham Barn-Petersfield Section Slip Roads) (Variation) Order 1990 (S.I. 1990/962)
- London–Portsmouth Trunk Road A3 (Liphook–Ham Barn Section Slip Roads) (Part 2) Order 1990 (S.I. 1990/963)
- London-Portsmouth Trunk Road A3 (Liphook-Ham Barn Section) (Parts 2: Headley Road to Queens Road) Order 1990 (S.I. 1990/964)
- London-Portsmouth Trunk Road A3 (Liphook-Petersfield Section Detrunking) Order 1990 (S.I. 1990/965)
- County Council of West Glamorgan (A4217 Cross-Valley Link at Pentrechwyth Classified Road) (Construction of Bridge Over Navigable Waters) Scheme 1989 Confirmation Instrument 1990 (S.I. 1990/972)
- Offshore Installations (Safety Zones) (No. 4) Order 1990 (S.I. 1990/973)
- Antarctic Treaty (Contracting Parties) Order 1990 (S.I. 1990/989)
- Marshall Scholarships Order 1990 (S.I. 1990/990)
- St. Helena Court of Appeal (Appeal to Privy Council) (Amendment) Order 1990 (S.I. 1990/991)
- Football Spectators (Corresponding Offences in Italy) Order 1990 (S.I. 1990/992)
- Football Spectators (Corresponding Offences in Scotland) Order 1990 (S.I. 1990/993)
- Transport (Amendment) (Northern Ireland) Order 1990 (S.I. 1990/994)
- Diving Operations at Work (Amendment) Regulations 1990 (S.I. 1990/996)
- Scotch Whisky Act 1988 (Commencement and Transitional Provisions) Order 1990 (S.I. 1990/997)
- Scotch Whisky Order 1990 (S.I. 1990/998)

== 1001–1100 ==
- Gipsy Encampments (District of Dover) Order 1990 (S.I. 1990/1001)
- Gipsy Encampments (Metropolitan District of Bradford) Order 1990 (S.I. 1990/1002)
- Design Right (Semiconductor Topographies) (Amendment) Regulations 1990 (S.I. 1990/1003)
- Land Registration (Execution of Deeds) Rules 1990 (S.I. 1990/1010)
- Solicitors Disciplinary Tribunal (Increase in Penalty) Order 1990 (S.I. 1990/1011)
- Nitrate Sensitive Areas (Designation) Order 1990 (S.I. 1990/1013)
- Sea Fish Licensing (Variation) (No. 2) Order 1990 (S.I. 1990/1014)
- Renfrew and City of Glasgow Districts (Cowan Park and Salterland Road) Boundaries Amendment Order 1990 (S.I. 1990/1016)
- Police (Discipline) (Senior Officers) (Scotland) Regulations 1990 (S.I. 1990/1017)
- Banking Act 1987 (Exempt Transactions) (Amendment No. 2) Regulations 1990.S.I. 1990/1018)
- Housing (Change of Landlord) (Payment of Disposal Cost by Instalments) Regulations 1990 (S.I. 1990/1019)
- Public Service Vehicles (Conduct of Drivers, Inspectors, Conductors and Passengers) Regulations 1990 (S.I. 1990/1020)
- West Yorkshire Residuary Body (Transfer of Property etc.) Order 1990 (S.I. 1990/1024)
- Blood Tests (Evidence of Paternity) (Amendment) (No. 2) Regulations 1990 (S.I. 1990/1025)
- Public Telecommunication System Designation (Diamond Cable (Nottingham) Ltd) Order 1990 (S.I. 1990/1026)
- Stock Transfer (Gilt-edged Securities) (Exempt Transfer) (Amendment) Regulations 1990 (S.I. 1990/1027)
- Housing (Change of Landlord) (Amendment) Regulations 1990 (S.I. 1990/1033)
- Legal Aid (Scotland) (Fees in Civil Proceedings) Amendment (No.2) Regulations 1990 (S.I. 1990/1034)
- Criminal Legal Aid (Scotland) (Fees) Amendment (No. 2) Regulations 1990 (S.I. 1990/1035)
- Civil Legal Aid (Scotland) (Fees) Amendment (No.2) Regulations 1990 (S.I. 1990/1036)
- Advice and Assistance (Scotland) Amendment (No. 2) Regulations 1990 (S.I. 1990/1037)
- Legal Aid (Scotland) (Fees in Criminal Proceedings) Amendment Regulations 1990 (S.I. 1990/1038)
- Inter-American Development Bank (Seventh General Increase) Order 1990 (S.I. 1990/1042)
- Manston Airport Licensing (Liquor) Order 1990 (S.I. 1990/1043)
- Manston Airport Shops Order 1990 (S.I. 1990/1044)
- National Health Service (General Ophthalmic Services) (Scotland) Amendment Regulations 1990 (S.I. 1990/1048)
- National Health Service (General Ophthalmic Services) Amendment Regulations 1990 (S.I. 1990/1051)
- Import and Export (Plant Health Fees) (England and Wales) (Amendment) Order 1990 (S.I. 1990/1052)
- Housing (Change of Landlord) (Prescribed Forms) (Amendment) Regulations 1990 (S.I. 1990/1059)
- Returning Officer's Expenses (Northern Ireland) Regulations 1990 (S.I. 1990/1065)
- Electricity Act 1989 (Variation of Section 34(1)(a)) Order 1990 (S.I. 1990/1066)
- Rent Book (Forms of Notice) (Amendment) Regulations 1990 (S.I. 1990/1067)
- Rent Officers (Additional Functions) (No. 2)Order 1990 (S.I. 1990/1068)
- Agriculture (Tractor Cabs) (Amendment) Regulations 1990 (S.I. 1990/1075)
- London Cab Order 1990 (S.I. 1990/1076)
- River Spey Salmon Fishery District (Baits and Lures) Regulations 1990 (S.I. 1990/1080)
- Education (National Curriculum) (Attainment Targets and Programmes of Study in Welsh) Order 1990 (S.I. 1990/1082)
- Water (Target Investment Limit) Order 1990 (S.I. 1990/1083)
- Preserved Sardines (Marketing Standards) Regulations 1990 (S.I. 1990/1084)
- Education (Recognised Awards) (Amendment) Order 1990 (S.I. 1990/1085)
- Building Societies (Designation of Qualifying Bodies) (Amendment) (No. 4) Order 1990 (S.I. 1990/1089)
- Local Authorities (Borrowing) (Amendment) Regulations 1990 (S.I. 1990/1091)
- Oil Fuel (Sulphur Content of Gas Oil) Regulations 1990 (S.I. 1990/1096)
- Motor Fuel (Sulphur Content of Gas Oil) (Amendment) Regulations 1990 (S.I. 1990/1097)

== 1101–1200 ==
- Road Transport (International Passenger Services) (Amendment) Regulations 1990 (S.I. 1990/1103)
- Heavy Goods Vehicles (Drivers' Licences) (Amendment) Regulations 1990 (S.I. 1990/1104)
- Public Service Vehicles (Drivers' Licences) (Amendment) Regulations 1990 (S.I. 1990/1105)
- Offshore Installations (Safety Zones) (No. 5) Order 1990 (S.I. 1990/1106)
- Self-Governing Schools etc. (Scotland) Act 1989 (Commencement No.2) Order 1990 (S.I. 1990/1108)
- Education (School Curriculum and Related Information) (Amendment) Regulations 1990 (S.I. 1990/1109)
- Inheritance Tax (Delivery of Accounts) Regulations 1990 (S.I. 1990/1110)
- Inheritance Tax (Delivery of Accounts) (Scotland) Regulations 1990 (S.I. 1990/1111)
- Inheritance Tax (Delivery of Accounts) (Northern Ireland) Regulations 1990 (S.I. 1990/1112)
- Motor Cars (Driving Instruction) (Amendment) Regulations 1990 (S.I. 1990/1113)
- Local Government Finance (Consequential Amendments) (Debt Administration) Order 1990 (S.I. 1990/1114)
- Motor Vehicles (Driving Licences) (Amendment) (No. 2) Regulations 1990 (S.I. 1990/1115)
- Gloucester Harbour Revision Order (Amendment) Order 1990 (S.I. 1990/1116)
- A16 Trunk Road (Great Grimsby Borough Boundary to Toll Bar Roundabout) (Detrunking) Order 1990 (S.I. 1990/1117)
- Export of Sheep (Prohibition) (No. 2) Amendment No. 2 Order 1990 (S.I. 1990/1120)
- Food Protection (Emergency Prohibitions) (England) Amendment No. 2 Order 1990 (S.I. 1990/1121)
- Medicines (Sale or Supply) (Miscellaneous Provisions) Amendment Regulations 1990 (S.I. 1990/1124)
- Farm and Conservation Grant (Amendment) Regulations 1990 (S.I. 1990/1125)
- Farm and Conservation Grant (Variation) Scheme 1990 (S.I. 1990/1126)
- Police (Amendment No. 2) Regulations 1990 (S.I. 1990/1127)
- York Waterworks (Constitution and Regulation) Order 1990 (S.I. 1990/1128)
- Medicines (Products Other Than Veterinary Drugs) (General Sale List) Amendment Order 1990 (S.I. 1990/1129)
- Public Telecommunication System Designation (United Artists Communications (London South) Plc) (Kingston and Richmond) Order 1990 (S.I. 1990/1130)
- Road Vehicles (Construction and Use) (Amendment) (No. 2) Regulations 1990 (S.I. 1990/1131)
- Preserved Sardines (Marketing Standards) (Scotland) Regulations 1990 (S.I. 1990/1139)
- Personal Pension Schemes (Advertisements) Regulations 1990 (S.I. 1990/1140)
- Personal and Occupational Pension Schemes (Miscellaneous Amendments) Regulations 1990 (S.I. 1990/1141)
- Personal and Occupational Pension Schemes (Miscellaneous Amendments) (No. 2) Regulations 1990 (S.I. 1990/1142)
- Personal and Occupational Pension Schemes (Perpetuities) Regulations 1990 (S.I. 1990/1143)
- Criminal Justice Act 1988 (Commencement No. 11) Order 1990 (S.I. 1990/1145)
- Company Auditors (Examinations) Regulations 1990 (S.I. 1990/1146)
- Town and Country Planning (Listed Buildings in Wales and Buildings in Conservation Areas in Wales) (Welsh Forms) Regulations 1990 (S.I. 1990/1147)
- Food Protection (Emergency Prohibitions) Amendment (No. 2) Order 1990 (S.I. 1990/1155)
- Bass (Specified Areas) (Prohibition of Fishing) Order 1990 (S.I. 1990/1156)
- Sea Fisheries Districts (Constitution of Committees) (Variation) Order 1990 (S.I. 1990/1157)
- National Dock Labour Board (Date of Dissolution) Order 1990 (S.I. 1990/1158)
- Insurance Companies (Legal Expenses Insurance) Regulations 1990 (S.I. 1990/1159)
- Insurance Companies (Legal Expenses Insurance) (Application for Authorisation) Regulations 1990 (S.I. 1990/1160)
- Food Protection (Emergency Prohibitions) (Wales) (No. 5) Amendment No. 2 Order 1990 (S.I. 1990/1161)
- London-Portsmouth Trunk Road A3 (Liphook-Ham Barn Section Slip Roads) (Part 1) Order 1988, Amendment Order 1990 (S.I. 1990/1162)
- Road Vehicles (Construction and Use) (Amendment) (No. 3) Regulations 1990 (S.I. 1990/1163)
- Highland Regional Council (River Einig, Oykel Bridge) Water Order 1990 (S.I. 1990/1165)
- Income Support (General) Amendment No. 2 Regulations 1990 (S.I. 1990/1168)
- Pleasure Craft (Arrival and Report) Regulations 1990 (S.I. 1990/1169)
- Home-Grown Cereals Authority (Rate of Levy) Order 1990 (S.I. 1990/1170)
- Public Telecommunication System Designation (Videotron London Limited) (Lambeth and Southwark) Order 1990 (S.I. 1990/1171)
- Public Telecommunication System Designation (Videotron London Limited) (Wandsworth) Order 1990 (S.I. 1990/1172)
- Law of Property (Miscellaneous Provisions) Act 1989 (Commencement) Order 1990 (S.I. 1990/1175)
- Swindon—Oxford Trunk Road (A420) (Kingston Bagpuize with Southmoor Bypass) Order 1990 (S.I. 1990/1176)
- Personal Community Charge (Exemptions) (Qualifying Courses of Education) (Scotland) Regulations 1990 (S.I. 1990/1178)
- Spirit Drinks Regulations 1990 (S.I. 1990/1179)
- Anglian, Hartlepools and Mid Kent (Pipelaying and Other Works) (Codes of Practice) Order 1990 (S.I. 1990/1180)
- Insurance Companies (Credit Insurance) Regulations 1990 (S.I. 1990/1181)
- Public Telecommunication System Designation (Cable and Satellite Television Holdings Ltd) (West Glamorgan) Order 1990 (S.I. 1990/1182)
- Unitary Development Plans (Rotherham) (Appointed Day) Order 1990 (S.I. 1990/1183)
- Agricultural Levies (Terms of Payment) Regulations 1990 (S.I. 1990/1185)
- Motor Vehicles (Tests) (Amendment) (No. 3) Regulations 1990 (S.I. 1990/1186)
- Nitrate Sensitive Areas (Designation) (Amendment) Order 1990 (S.I. 1990/1187)
- Value Added Tax (Refund of Tax) (Revocation) Order 1990 (S.I. 1990/1188)
- Housing Renovation etc. Grants (Reduction of Grant) Regulations 1990 (S.I. 1990/1189)
- Magistrates' Courts (Civilian Fine Enforcement Officers) Rules 1990 (S.I. 1990/1190)
- Goods Vehicles (Operators' Licences) (Temporary Use in Great Britain) (Amendment) Regulations 1990 (S.I. 1990/1191)
- Goods Vehicles (Community Cabotage Authorisations) (Fees) Regulations 1990 (S.I. 1990/1192)
- Spirit Drinks (Scotland) Regulations 1990 (S.I. 1990/1196)
- Companies (Fees) (Amendment) Regulations 1990 (S.I. 1990/1197)
- Antarctic Treaty Act 1967 (Isle of Man) (Variation) Order 1990 (S.I. 1990/1198)
- Drug Trafficking Offences Act 1986 (Designated Countries and Territories) Order 1990 (S.I. 1990/1199)
- Industrial Training(Northern Ireland) Order 1990 (S.I. 1990/1200)

== 1201–1300 ==
- Trial of the Pyx (Amendment) Order 1990 (S.I. 1990/1201)
- New Forest (Confirmation of Byelaws of the Verderers of the New Forest) Order 1990 (S.I. 1990/1202)
- European Economic Interest Grouping (Fees) (Amendment) Regulations 1990 (S.I. 1990/1203)
- Medicines (Fees Relating to Medicinal Products for Animal Use) Regulations 1990 (S.I. 1990/1205)
- Company Auditors (Recognition Orders) (Application Fees) Regulations 1990 (S.I. 1990/1206)
- Insurance Companies (Transfer of Long Term Business) Regulations 1990 (S.I. 1990/1207)
- Education (Welsh Medium Teacher Training Incentive Supplement) Regulations 1990 (S.I. 1990/1208)
- Medicines (Medicated Animal Feeding Stuffs) (Amendment) Regulations 1990 (S.I. 1990/1210)
- Stock Transfer (Gilt-edged Securities) (Exempt Transfer) Regulations 1990 (S.I. 1990/1211)
- Submarine Pipe-lines (Designated Owners) Order 1990 (S.I. 1990/1217)
- Submarine Pipe-lines (Designated Owners) (No. 2) Order 1990 (S.I. 1990/1218)
- Submarine Pipe-lines (Designated Owners) (No. 3) Order 1990 (S.I. 1990/1219)
- Submarine Pipe-lines (Designated Owners) (No. 4) Order 1990 (S.I. 1990/1220)
- Submarine Pipe-lines (Designated Owners) (No. 5) Order 1990 (S.I. 1990/1221)
- Submarine Pipe-lines (Designated Owners) (No. 6) Order 1990 (S.I. 1990/1222)
- British Railways Board (Central Wales Railway) Light Railway (Amendment) Order 1990 (S.I. 1990/1223)
- Agricultural or Forestry Tractors and Tractor Components (Type Approval) (Fees) (Amendment) Regulations 1990 (S.I. 1990/1231)
- Housing Renovation etc. Grants (Prescribed Forms and Particulars) Regulations 1990 (S.I. 1990/1236)
- Gipsy Encampments (District of Richmondshire) Order 1990 (S.I. 1990/1239)
- Slaughter of Animals (Humane Conditions) (Scotland) Regulations 1990 (S.I. 1990/1240)
- London Docklands Development Corporation (Vesting of Land) (London Borough of Southwark) Order 1989 Approved by both Houses of ParliamentS.I. 1990/1241)
- Slaughter of Animals (Humane Conditions) Regulations 1990 (S.I. 1990/1242)
- Slaughter of Poultry (Humane Conditions) (Amendment) Regulations 1990 (S.I. 1990/1243)
- The Mendip (Parishes) Order 1990 S.I. 1990/1244
- Merchant Shipping (Fees) (Amendment) Regulations 1990 (S.I. 1990/1254)
- Classification, Packaging and Labelling of Dangerous Substances (Amendment) Regulations 1990 (S.I. 1990/1255)
- Fees in the Department of the Registers of Scotland (Amendment) Order 1990 (S.I. 1990/1256)
- Act of Sederunt (Rules of the Court of Session Amendment No.4) (Solicitors' Fees) 1990 (S.I. 1990/1262)
- Inner London Juvenile Courts (Selection of Chairmen) Order 1990 (S.I. 1990/1265)
- Petty Sessional Divisions (Bedfordshire) Order 1990 (S.I. 1990/1266)
- London-Portsmouth Trunk Road A3 (Liphook-Ham Barn Section Slip Roads) (Part 3) Order 1990 (S.I. 1990/1269)
- Suppression of Terrorism Act 1978 (Designation of Countries) Order 1990 (S.I. 1990/1272)
- Local Authorities (Capital Finance) (Amendment) Regulations 1990 (S.I. 1990/1273)
- Local Government and Housing Act 1989 (Commencement No. 8 and Transitional Provisions) Order 1990 (S.I. 1990/1274)
- Petty Sessional Divisions (Berkshire) Order 1990 (S.I. 1990/1275)
- Corn Returns (Scotland) (Variation) Regulations 1990 (S.I. 1990/1276)
- School Boards (Financial Information) (Scotland) Regulations 1990 (S.I. 1990/1277)
- Higher Education (Wales) Regulations 1990 (S.I. 1990/1278)
- Education (School Teachers' Pay and Conditions) Order 1990 (S.I. 1990/1281)
- Housing (Right to Buy) (Designated Rural Areas and Designated Regions) (England) Order 1990 (S.I. 1990/1282)
- Local Government Superannuation (Scotland) Amendment (No.2) Regulations 1990 (S.I. 1990/1284)
- Local Government Finance (Miscellaneous Amendments and Repeal) Order 1990 (S.I. 1990/1285)
- Social Security (Local Councillors) Amendment Regulations 1990 (S.I. 1990/1286)
- Income Tax (Interest Relief) (Qualifying Lenders) Order 1990 (S.I. 1990/1298)
- Personal Injuries (Civilians) Amendment (No. 2) Scheme 1990 (S.I. 1990/1300)

== 1301–1400 ==
- Police (Dispensation from Requirement to Investigate Complaints) Regulations 1990 (S.I. 1990/1301)
- Leicester-Great Yarmouth Trunk Road (A47) (Etling Green Junction Improvement Slip Road) Order 1990 (S.I. 1990/1302)
- European Communities (Designation) (No. 2) Order 1990 (S.I. 1990/1304)
- Appropriation (No. 2)(Northern Ireland) Order 1990 (S.I. 1990/1305)
- Extradition (Suppression of Terrorism) (Amendment) Order 1990 (S.I. 1990/1306)
- Parliamentary Constituencies (England) (Miscellaneous Changes) Order 1990 (S.I. 1990/1307)
- Naval, Military and Air Forces etc. (Disablement and Death) Service Pensions Amendment (No. 2) Order 1990 (S.I. 1990/1308)
- Cable (Prescribed Diffusion Service) Order 1990 (S.I. 1990/1309)
- Nursing Homes Registration (Scotland)S.I. 1990/1310)
- Central Institutions (Recognition) (Scotland) Regulations 1990 (S.I. 1990/1311)
- Police (Scotland) Amendment (No. 2) Regulations 1990 (S.I. 1990/1312)
- Employment Subsidies Act 1978 (Renewal) (Great Britain) Order 1990 (S.I. 1990/1313)
- Home-Grown Cereals Authority Levy (Variation) Scheme (Approval) Order 1990 (S.I. 1990/1316)
- Home-Grown Cereals Authority Oilseeds Levy Scheme (Approval) Order 1990 (S.I. 1990/1317)
- Electricity (Restrictive Trade Practices Act 1976) (Exemptions) (No. 2) Order 1990 (S.I. 1990/1319)
- London North Circular Trunk Road (A406) and the London—Cambridge—King's Lynn Trunk Road (A10) (Enfield) (Speed Limits) Order 1990 (S.I. 1990/1320)
- Ungraded Eggs (Hygiene) Regulations 1990 (S.I. 1990/1323)
- National Health Service and Community Care Act 1990 (Commencement No. 1) Order 1990 (S.I. 1990/1329)
- Family Health Services Authorities (Membership and Procedure) Regulations 1990 (S.I. 1990/1330)
- Regional and District Health Authorities (Membership and Procedure) Regulations 1990 (S.I. 1990/1331)
- Petroleum (Production) (Seaward Areas) (Amendment) Regulations 1990 (S.I. 1990/1332)
- Insurance Companies (Amendment) Regulations 1990 (S.I. 1990/1333)
- A40 Trunk Road (Western Avenue, Hillingdon) (Prescribed Routes) Order 1990 (S.I. 1990/1334)
- Local Government and Housing Act 1989 (Commencement No. 8 and Transitional Provisions) (Amendment) Order 1990 (S.I. 1990/1335)
- Ungraded Eggs (Hygiene) (Scotland) Regulations 1990 (S.I. 1990/1336)
- Pilotage Act 1987 (Pilotage Commission: Transfer of Property, Rights and Liabilities) Order 1990 (S.I. 1990/1338)
- Thames Water Utilities Limited (Local Statutory Provisions) (Consequential Repeals) Order 1990 (S.I. 1990/1339)
- St Mary's Music School (Aided Places) Amendment Regulations 1990 (S.I. 1990/1345)
- Education (Assisted Places) (Scotland) Amendment Regulations 1990 (S.I. 1990/1346)
- Education Authority Bursaries (Scotland) Amendment Regulations 1990 (S.I. 1990/1347)
- Students' Allowances (Scotland) Amendment Regulations 1990 (S.I. 1990/1348)
- War Pensions Committees Regulations 1990 (S.I. 1990/1349)
- Corn Returns (Variation) Regulations 1990 (S.I. 1990/1351)
- Fodder Plant Seeds (Amendment) Regulations 1990 (S.I. 1990/1352)
- Seeds (National Lists of Varieties) (Amendment) Regulations 1990 (S.I. 1990/1353)
- Northumbria Regional Flood Defence Committee (Appointed Day) Order 1990 (S.I. 1990/1354)
- Southern Regional Flood Defence Committee (Appointed Day) Order 1990 (S.I. 1990/1355)
- South West Regional Flood Defence Committee (Appointed Day) Order 1990 (S.I. 1990/1356)
- Yorkshire Regional Flood Defence Committee (Appointed Day) Order 1990 (S.I. 1990/1357)
- Building (Procedure) (Scotland) Amendment Regulations 1990 (S.I. 1990/1358)
- Land Registration Act 1988 (Commencement) Order 1990 (S.I. 1990/1359)
- Land Registration (Matrimonial Homes) Rules 1990 (S.I. 1990/1360)
- Land Registration (Official Searches) Rules 1990 (S.I. 1990/1361)
- Land Registration (Open Register) Rules 1990 (S.I. 1990/1362)
- Common Agricultural Policy (Wine) Regulations 1990 (S.I. 1990/1363)
- Road Traffic Accidents (Payments for Treatment) Order 1990 (S.I. 1990/1364)
- Companies (Fees) (Amendment No. 2) Regulations 1990 (S.I. 1990/1368)
- Community Health Councils (Amendment) Regulations 1990 (S.I. 1990/1375)
- Enduring Powers of Attorney (Prescribed Form) Regulations 1990 (S.I. 1990/1376)
- Health and Safety (Training for Employment) Regulations 1990 (S.I. 1990/1380)
- Education (Individual Pupils' Achievements) (Information) Regulations 1990 (S.I. 1990/1381)
- Lands Tribunal (Amendment) Rules 1990 (S.I. 1990/1382)
- Food Safety Act 1990 (Commencement No. 1) Order 1990 (S.I. 1990/1383)
- Home Purchase Assistance (Recognised Lending Institutions) Order 1990 (S.I. 1990/1387)
- Housing (Right to Buy) (Priority of Charges)Order 1990 (S.I. 1990/1388)
- Mortgage Indemnities (Recognised Bodies)Order 1990 (S.I. 1990/1389)
- Food Protection (Emergency Prohibitions) (Lead in Cattle) (England) Order 1990 (S.I. 1990/1391)
- Companies Act 1989 (Commencement No. 6 and Transitional and Saving Provisions) Order 1990 (S.I. 1990/1392)
- Companies (Fair Dealing by Directors) (Increase in Financial Limits) Order 1990 (S.I. 1990/1393)
- Companies (Unregistered Companies) (Amendment No. 2) Regulations 1990 (S.I. 1990/1394)
- Definition of Subsidiary (Consequential Amendments) Regulations 1990 (S.I. 1990/1395)
- Motor Vehicles (Driving Licences) (Amendment) (No. 3) Regulations 1990 (S.I. 1990/1396)
- Copyright, Designs and Patents Act 1988 (Commencement No. 5) Order 1990 (S.I. 1990/1400)

== 1401–1500 ==
- Education (Student Loans) Regulations 1990 (S.I. 1990/1401)
- Public Telecommunication System Designation (East Coast Cable Ltd) (Ipswich and Colchester) Order 1990 (S.I. 1990/1402)
- A590 Greenodd to Barrow-in-Furness Trunk Road (Improvement at Melton Terrace) Order 1990 (S.I. 1990/1403)
- Greenodd to Barrow-in-Furness Trunk Road (A590 Dalton-in-Furness Bypass) Order 1990 (S.I. 1990/1404)
- Greenodd to Barrow-in-Furness Trunk Road (A590 Dalton-in-Furness Bypass) (Detrunking) Order 1990 (S.I. 1990/1405)
- Park Road (East of Oak Lea Road to North Road) (Trunking) Order 1990 (S.I. 1990/1406)
- National Health Service (Appointment of Consultants) Amendment Regulations 1990 (S.I. 1990/1407)
- A59 Trunk Road Mellor Brook (Detrunking) Order 1990 (S.I. 1990/1409)
- Samlesbury—Skipton Trunk Road (A59 Mellor Brook Bypass) Order 1990 (S.I. 1990/1410)
- Coal Industry (Restructuring Grants) Order 1990 (S.I. 1990/1411)
- Social Security Revaluation of Earnings Factors Order 1990 (S.I. 1990/1412)
- Community Charges (Administration and Enforcement) (Amendment) (No. 2) Regulations 1990 (S.I. 1990/1426)
- Copyright (Material Open to Public Inspection) (Marking of Copies of Plans and Drawings) Order 1990 (S.I. 1990/1427)
- Opencast Coal (Rate of Interest on Compensation) (No. 2) Order 1990 (S.I. 1990/1429)
- Food Hygiene (Amendment) Regulations 1990 (S.I. 1990/1431)
- Education (Reorganisation in Inner London) (Redundancy Payments) (Amendment) Order 1990 (S.I. 1990/1432)
- Education (Reorganisation in Inner London) (Compensation) (Amendment) Regulations 1990 (S.I. 1990/1433)
- Building Societies (Designation of Qualifying Bodies) Order 1990 (S.I. 1990/1434)
- Charge Limitation (England) (Maximum Amount) Order 1990 (S.I. 1990/1435)
- Charge Limitation (England) (Maximum Amount) (No. 2) Order 1990 (S.I. 1990/1436)
- Charge Limitation (England) (Maximum Amount) (No. 3) Order 1990 (S.I. 1990/1437)
- Church of England (Legal Aid) Rules 1990 (S.I. 1990/1438)
- Ecclesiastical Judges and legal Officers (Fees) Order 1990 (S.I. 1990/1439)
- Legal Officers (Annual Fees) Order 1990 (S.I. 1990/1440)
- Parochial Fees Order 1990 (S.I. 1990/1441)
- Northern Ireland Act 1974 (Interim Period Extension) Order 1990 (S.I. 1990/1442)
- Leicester—Great Yarmouth Trunk Road (A47)(Narborough Bypass) Order 1990 (S.I. 1990/1443)
- Welfare of Livestock Regulations 1990 Approved by both Houses of ParliamentS.I. 1990/1445)
- Social Security Act 1990 (Commencement No. 1) Order 1990 (S.I. 1990/1446)
- Local Government (Politically Restricted Posts) (No. 2) Regulations 1990 (S.I. 1990/1447)
- Police and Criminal Evidence Act 1984 (Application to Armed Forces) (Amendment) Order 1990 (S.I. 1990/1448)
- Glasgow to Carlisle Motorway (M74) (River Sark to Guards Mill Section) Scheme 1990 (S.I. 1990/1450)
- Inshore Fishing (Birch Point, Firth of Clyde) (Prohibition of Fishing) Order 1990 (S.I. 1990/1451)
- Portsmouth (Camber Dock and Flathouse Wharf) Harbour Revision Order 1990 (S.I. 1990/1452)
- Design Right (Proceedings before Comptroller) (Amendment) Rules 1990 (S.I. 1990/1453)
- Patent Agents (Non-recognition of Certain Agents by Comptroller) Rules 1990 (S.I. 1990/1454)
- Patents (Amendment) Rules 1990 (S.I. 1990/1455)
- Registered Designs (Amendment) Rules 1990 (S.I. 1990/1456)
- Register of Patent Agents Rules 1990 (S.I. 1990/1457)
- Register of Trade Mark Agents Rules 1990 (S.I. 1990/1458)
- Trade Marks and Service Marks (Amendment) Rules 1990 (S.I. 1990/1459)
- Supreme Court Fees (Amendment) Order 1990 (S.I. 1990/1460)
- Agricultural Holdings (Form of Award in Arbitration Proceedings) Order 1990 (S.I. 1990/1472)
- Department of Trade and Industry (Fees) (Amendment) Order 1990 (S.I. 1990/1473)
- Assured Tenancies and Agricultural Occupancies (Rent Information) (Amendment) Order 1990 (S.I. 1990/1474)
- Legal Advice and Assistance (Scope) (Amendment) Regulations 1990 (S.I. 1990/1477)
- Local Government Act 1988 (Defined Activities) (Competition and Specified Periods) (Scotland) Regulations 1990 (S.I. 1990/1484)
- Local Government Act 1988 (Defined Activities) (Exemptions) (Scotland) Amendment Order 1990 (S.I. 1990/1485)
- Abolition of Domestic Rates (Domestic and Part Residential Subjects) (No.2) (Scotland) Regulations 1990 (S.I. 1990/1486)
- Social Security (Unemployment, Sickness and Invalidity Benefit) Amendment Regulations 1990 (S.I. 1990/1487)
- Electricity (Restrictive Trade Practices Act 1976) (Exemptions) (No. 3) Order 1990 (S.I. 1990/1490)
- Financial Services Act 1986 (Electricity Industry Exemptions) Order 1990 (S.I. 1990/1492)
- Financial Services Act 1986 (Restriction of Scope of Act and Meaning of Collective Investment Scheme)(No. 2) Order 1990 (S.I. 1990/1493)
- Food Protection (Emergency Prohibitions) (England) Amendment No. 3 Order 1990 (S.I. 1990/1494)
- County Court (Amendment No. 2) Rules 1990 (S.I. 1990/1495)
- Patents County Court (Designation and Jurisdiction) Order 1990 (S.I. 1990/1496)
- Public Record Office (Fees) Regulations 1990 (S.I. 1990/1497)
- Local Government Act 1988 (Defined Activities) (Competition) (Wales) Regulations 1990 (S.I. 1990/1498)
- Local Government Act 1988 (Defined Activities) (Exemptions) (Wales) (Amendment) Order 1990 (S.I. 1990/1499)
- Highways (Road Humps) (Amendment) Regulations 1990 (S.I. 1990/1500)

== 1501–1600 ==
- Army, Air Force and Naval Discipline Acts (Continuation) Order 1990 (S.I. 1990/1501)
- British Nationality (Namibia) Order 1990 (S.I. 1990/1502)
- Child Abduction and Custody (Parties to Conventions) Order 1990 (S.I. 1990/1503)
- Companies (No. 2) (Northern Ireland) Order 1990 (S.I. 1990/1504)
- Copyright, Designs and Patents Act 1988 (Isle of Man) Order 1990 (S.I. 1990/1505)
- Education (Student Loans) (Northern Ireland) Order 1990 (S.I. 1990/1506)
- European Convention on Extradition Order 1990 (S.I. 1990/1507)
- Horse Racing (Northern Ireland) Order 1990 (S.I. 1990/1508)
- Pensions (Miscellaneous Provisions) (Northern Ireland) Order 1990 (S.I. 1990/1509)
- Planning and Building Regulations (Amendment) (Northern Ireland) Order 1990 (S.I. 1990/1510)
- Social Security (Northern Ireland) Order 1990 (S.I. 1990/1511)
- Copyright (Status of Former Dependent Territories) Order 1990 (S.I. 1990/1512)
- Films Co-Production Agreements (Amendment) Order 1990 (S.I. 1990/1513)
- Air Navigation (Noise Certification) Order 1990 (S.I. 1990/1514)
- Planning (Listed Buildings and Conservation Areas) Regulations 1990 (S.I. 1990/1519)
- National Health Service and Community Care Act 1990 (Commencement No.2) (Scotland) Order 1990 (S.I. 1990/1520)
- Food Protection (Emergency Prohibitions) (Wales)(No. 5) Amendment No. 3 Order 1990 (S.I. 1990/1523)
- Education (Special Educational Needs) (Amendment) Regulations 1990 (S.I. 1990/1524)
- Authorities for London Post-Graduate Teaching Hospitals (Constitution) Order 1990 (S.I. 1990/1525)
- Authorities for London Post-Graduate Teaching Hospitals Regulations 1990 (S.I. 1990/1526)
- Aerodromes (Designation) (Detention and Sale of Aircraft) Order 1990 (S.I. 1990/1527)
- Banking Act 1987 (Exempt Transactions) (Amendment No. 3) Regulations 1990 (S.I. 1990/1529)
- Occupational Pension Schemes (Transitional Provisions and Savings) Regulations 1990 (S.I. 1990/1530)
- Education (National Curriculum) (Attainment Targets and Programmes of Study in Technology) (Amendment) Order 1990 (S.I. 1990/1531)
- Assured Tenancies and Agricultural Occupancies (Forms) (Amendment) Regulations 1990 (S.I. 1990/1532)
- Rainhill Stoops to Queensway Trunk Road (A568 Widnes Eastern Bypass and Slip Roads) Order 1990 (S.I. 1990/1533)
- Education (Access Funds) (Scotland) Regulations 1990 (S.I. 1990/1534)
- Food Protection (Emergency Prohibitions) Amendment (No.3) Order 1990 (S.I. 1990/1535)
- Life Assurance (Apportionment of Receipts of Participating Funds) (Applicable Percentage) Order 1990 (S.I. 1990/1541)
- The Teignbridge (Parishes) Order 1990 S.I. 1990/1542
- Education (National Curriculum) (Assessment Arrangements for English, Mathematics and Science) Order 1990 (S.I. 1990/1543)
- Combined Probation Areas (Bedfordshire)Order 1990 (S.I. 1990/1544)
- Education (Assisted Places) (Amendment) Regulations 1990 (S.I. 1990/1546)
- Education (Assisted Places) (Incidental Expenses) (Amendment) Regulations 1990 (S.I. 1990/1547)
- Education (Grants) (Music and Ballet Schools) (Amendment) Regulations 1990 (S.I. 1990/1548)
- Social Security Benefits (Student Loans and Miscellaneous Amendments) Regulations 1990 (S.I. 1990/1549)
- Weights and Measures (Various Foods) (Amendment) Order 1990 (S.I. 1990/1550)
- School Pupil Records (Scotland) Regulations 1990 (S.I. 1990/1551)
- Local Government and Housing Act 1989 (Commencement No. 9 and Saving) Order 1990 (S.I. 1990/1552)
- Local Government (Committees and Political Groups) Regulations 1990 (S.I. 1990/1553)
- Justices of the Peace (Size and Chairmanship of Bench) Rules 1990 (S.I. 1990/1554)
- Education (Further and Higher Education Institutions Access Funds) Regulations 1990 (S.I. 1990/1555)
- Sheep Scab (National Dip) Order 1990 (S.I. 1990/1557)
- Social Security (Recoupment) Amendment Regulations 1990 (S.I. 1990/1558)
- Seed Potatoes (Fees) (Scotland) Regulations 1990 (S.I. 1990/1559)
- Further Education Student Records (Scotland) Regulations 1990 (S.I. 1990/1560)
- Education (Teachers) (Amendment) Regulations 1990 (S.I. 1990/1561)
- Town and Country Planning (Control of Advertisements) (Amendment) (No. 2) Regulations 1990 (S.I. 1990/1562)
- EEC Merger Control(Consequential Provisions) Regulations 1990 (S.I. 1990/1563)
- Local Government Act 1988 (Defined Activities) (Competition) (England) Regulations 1990 (S.I. 1990/1564)
- Local Government Act 1988 (Defined Activities) (Exemptions) (England) (Amendment) Order 1990 (S.I. 1990/1565)
- Central Rating Lists (Amendment) (No. 2) Regulations 1990 (S.I. 1990/1566)
- London Docklands Development Corporation (Planning Functions) Order 1990 (S.I. 1990/1567)
- Merseyside Development Corporation (Planning Functions) Order 1990 (S.I. 1990/1568)
- A20 Trunk Road (Sidcup Road, Greenwich) (Prohibition of Use of Gap in Central Reservation) Order 1990 (S.I. 1990/1569)
- Criminal Justice Act 1988 (Confiscation Orders) Order 1990 (S.I. 1990/1570)
- Police Cadets (Scotland) Amendment Regulations 1990 (S.I. 1990/1571)
- Police (Amendment No. 3) Regulations 1990 (S.I. 1990/1573)
- Police Cadets (Amendment) Regulations 1990 (S.I. 1990/1574)
- Police Federation (Amendment) Regulations 1990 (S.I. 1990/1575)
- Prevention of Terrorism (Temporary Provisions)(Designated Ports) Order 1990 (S.I. 1990/1579)
- Limited Partnerships (Unrestricted Size) No. 2 Regulations 1990 (S.I. 1990/1580)
- Partnerships (Unrestricted Size) No. 6 Regulations 1990 (S.I. 1990/1581)
- Industrial Training Levy (Road Transport) Order 1990 (S.I. 1990/1582)
- Redundancy Payments (Merchant Seamen Exclusion)Order 1973 (Revocation) Order 1990 (S.I. 1990/1583)
- Milk and Dairies and Milk (Special Designation) (Charges) Regulations 1990 (S.I. 1990/1584)
- Special Road (Glan Conwy to Conwy Morfa) Regulations 1990 (S.I. 1990/1586)
- General Medical Council Preliminary Proceedings Committee and Professional Conduct Committee (Procedure) (Amendment) Rules Order of Council 1990 (S.I. 1990/1587)
- Export of Goods (Control) (Amendment No. 4) Order 1990 (S.I. 1990/1588)
- Diseases of Animals (Approved Disinfectants)(Amendment) (No. 2) Order 1990 (S.I. 1990/1589)
- Meat and Livestock Commission Levy (Variation) Scheme (Confirmation) Order 1990 (S.I. 1990/1590)
- Control of Gold, Securities, Payments and Credits (Kuwait) Directions 1990 (S.I. 1990/1591)
- Plant Breeders' Rights (Amendment) Regulations 1990 (S.I. 1990/1592)
- Plant Breeders' Rights (Festulolium) Scheme 1990 (S.I. 1990/1593)
- Plant Breeders' Rights (Miscellaneous Ornamental Plants) Scheme 1990 (S.I. 1990/1594)
- Plant Breeders' Rights (Oil and Fibre Plants) (Variation) Scheme 1990 (S.I. 1990/1595)
- Plant Breeders' Rights (Trees, Shrubs and Woody Climbers) (Variation) Scheme 1990 (S.I. 1990/1596)
- Dartford—Thurrock Crossing Tolls Order 1990 (S.I. 1990/1597)
- Dartford—Thurrock Crossing (Amendment) Regulations 1990 (S.I. 1990/1598)
- Education (Bursaries for Teacher Training) (Amendment) Regulations 1990 (S.I. 1990/1599)

== 1601–1700 ==
- Control of Gold, Securities, Payments and Credits (Republic of Iraq) Directions 1990 (S.I. 1990/1616)
- Portsmouth Water (Constitution and Regulation) Order 1990 (S.I. 1990/1617)
- River Deveron Salmon Fishery District (Baits and Lures) Regulations 1990 (S.I. 1990/1618)
- A45 Trunk Road (Coventry Road and Daventry Road, Dunchurch) (De-Trunking) Order 1990 (S.I. 1990/1619)
- M45 Motorway (Thurlaston to Dunchurch Section) Connecting Roads Scheme 1990 (S.I. 1990/1620)
- Nurses, Midwives and Health Visitors (Midwives Training) Amendment Rules Approval Order 1990 (S.I. 1990/1624)
- Caribbean Territories (Control of Gold, Securities, Payments and Credits: Kuwait and Republic of Iraq)Order 1990 (S.I. 1990/1625)
- Potato Marketing Scheme (Amendment) Order 1990 (S.I. 1990/1626)
- Education (Mandatory Awards) Regulations 1990 (S.I. 1990/1628)
- Trade Effluents (Prescribed Processes and Substances) (Amendment) Regulations 1990 (S.I. 1990/1629)
- Gas (Alternative Method of Charge) Regulations 1990 (S.I. 1990/1634)
- Gas (Testing of Apparatus and Equipment) Regulations 1990 (S.I. 1990/1635)
- Local Government (Assistants for Political Groups) (Remuneration) Order 1990 (S.I. 1990/1636)
- College Councils (Scotland) (No.2) Regulations 1990 (S.I. 1990/1637)
- National Health Service (General Dental Services) (Miscellaneous Amendments) Regulations 1990 (S.I. 1990/1638)
- Education (National Curriculum)(Assessment Arrangements in English, Welsh, Mathematics and Science) (Wales) Order 1990 (S.I. 1990/1639)
- Export of Goods (Control) (Iraq and Kuwait Sanctions) Order 1990 (S.I. 1990/1640)
- Sea Fish Industry Authority (Levy Powers) Order 1990 (S.I. 1990/1641)
- Anglian Regional Flood Defence Committee (Appointed Day) Order 1990 (S.I. 1990/1642)
- Anglian Regional Flood Defence Committee Order 1990 (S.I. 1990/1643)
- North West Regional Flood Defence Committee (Appointed Day) Order 1990 (S.I. 1990/1644)
- Severn-Trent Regional Flood Defence Committee (Appointed Day) Order 1990 (S.I. 1990/1645)
- Wessex Regional Flood Defence Committee (Appointed Day) Order 1990 (S.I. 1990/1646)
- Wessex Regional Flood Defence Committee Order 1990 (S.I. 1990/1647)
- Cambridge, East Surrey, East Worcestershire and Yorkshire (Pipelaying and Other Works)(Codes of Practice) Order 1990 (S.I. 1990/1648)
- A12 Trunk Road (Eastern Avenue, Redbridge) (Prescribed Routes) Order 1990 (S.I. 1990/1649)
- Iraq and Kuwait (United Nations Sanctions) Order 1990 (S.I. 1990/1651)
- Iraq and Kuwait (United Nations Sanctions) (Dependent Territories) Order 1990 (S.I. 1990/1652)
- Education (Inner London Education Authority) (Transitional and Supplementary Provisions) (No. 3) Order 1990 (S.I. 1990/1653)
- Secretary of State's Traffic Orders (Procedure) (England and Wales) Regulations 1990 (S.I. 1990/1656)
- Income-Related Benefits Amendment Regulations 1990 (S.I. 1990/1657)
- Mid Kent Water (Constitution and Regulation) Order 1990 (S.I. 1990/1658)
- Portsmouth Flathouse Quay Harbour Revision Order 1990 (S.I. 1990/1659)
- Merger (Fees) Regulations 1990 (S.I. 1990/1660)
- National Health Service (Travelling Expenses and Remission of Charges) Amendment No. 2 Regulations 1990 (S.I. 1990/1661)
- National Health Service (Travelling Expenses and Remission of Charges) (Scotland) Amendment (No.2) Regulations 1990 (S.I. 1990/1665)
- Food Protection (Emergency Prohibitions) (Heavy Metal Poisoning) (England) Order 1990 (S.I. 1990/1666)
- Accounting Standards (Prescribed Body) Regulations 1990 (S.I. 1990/1667)
- Import and Export (Plant Health Fees) (Forestry) (Great Britain) Order 1990 (S.I. 1990/1668)
- Professions Supplementary to Medicine (Registration Rules) (Amendment) Order of Council 1990 (S.I. 1990/1669)
- Bristol, Rickmansworth, Sunderland and South Shields and Sutton (Pipelaying and Other Works) (Codes of Practice) Order 1990 (S.I. 1990/1670)
- Movements of Capital (Required Information) Regulations 1990 (S.I. 1990/1671)
- Telecommunication Apparatus (Approval Fees) (British Approvals Board for Telecommunications) Order 1990 (S.I. 1990/1679)
- Yorkshire Water Authority (Reconstitution of the Keyingham Level Drainage Board) Order 1989S.I. 1990/1680)
- Yorkshire Water Authority (Reconstitution of the Muston and Yedingham Drainage Board) Order 1989S.I. 1990/1681)
- Yorkshire Water Authority (Reconstitution of the Reedness and Swinefleet Drainage Board) Order 1990 (S.I. 1990/1682)
- Yorkshire Water Authority (Reconstitution of the Wilberfoss and Thornton Level Drainage Board) Order 1989S.I. 1990/1683)
- Yorkshire Water Authority (Reconstitution of the Winestead Level Drainage Board) Order 1989S.I. 1990/1684)
- Camden (Waiting and Loading Restriction) (Amendment No. 106) Order 1990 (S.I. 1990/1685)
- Rules of the Supreme Court (Amendment No. 2) 1990 (S.I. 1990/1689)
- Environmentally Sensitive Areas Designation (Wales) (Welsh Language Provisions) Order 1990 (S.I. 1990/1693)
- Protection of Wrecks (Designation No. 2)Order 1990 (S.I. 1990/1694)
- Building Societies (Transfer of Business) (Amendment) Regulations 1990 (S.I. 1990/1695)
- Agricultural Holdings (Units of Production) Order 1990 (S.I. 1990/1696)
- Patents (Fees) Rules 1990 (S.I. 1990/1697)
- Registered Designs (Fees) Rules 1990 (S.I. 1990/1698)
- Design Right (Proceedings before Comptroller)(Amendment) (No. 2) Rules 1990 (S.I. 1990/1699)
- New Towns (Transfer of Housing Stock) Regulations 1990 (S.I. 1990/1700)

== 1701–1800 ==
- A41 Trunk Road (Finchley Road, Camden) (Prescribed Routes) Order 1990 (S.I. 1990/1701)
- A41 Trunk Road (Finchley Road, Camden) (Box Junctions) Order 1990 (S.I. 1990/1702)
- Companies Act 1989 (Commencement No. 7 and Transitional and Saving Provisions) Order 1990 (S.I. 1990/1707)
- Section 19 Minibus (Designated Bodies) (Amendment) Order 1990 (S.I. 1990/1708)
- Local Government Superannuation (Amendment)Regulations 1990 (S.I. 1990/1709)
- Local Government Act 1985 (Thames Water Authority Regional Land Drainage Committee) (Revocation) Order 1990 (S.I. 1990/1710)
- Thames Regional Flood Defence Committee (Appointed Day) Order 1990 (S.I. 1990/1711)
- Thames Regional Flood Defence Committee Order 1990 (S.I. 1990/1712)
- Local Authorities (Allowances) (Scotland) Amendment Regulations 1990 (S.I. 1990/1713)
- Personal Community Charge (Relief) (No. 2) (Scotland) Regulations 1990 (S.I. 1990/1714)
- EEC Merger Control (Distinct Market Investigations)Regulations 1990 (S.I. 1990/1715)
- Set-Aside (Amendment) Regulations 1990 (S.I. 1990/1716)
- Local Government (Allowances) (Amendment) Regulations 1990 (S.I. 1990/1717)
- Prescription Pricing Authority Constitution Order 1990 (S.I. 1990/1718)
- Prescription Pricing Authority Regulations 1990 (S.I. 1990/1719)
- Petty Sessional Divisions (Lincolnshire) Order 1990 (S.I. 1990/1720)
- M5 Birmingham-Exeter Motorway (Strensham Junction 8) Connecting Roads Scheme 1990 (S.I. 1990/1722)
- M5 Birmingham-Exeter Motorway (Warndon Junction 6) Connecting Roads Scheme 1990 (S.I. 1990/1723)
- M5 Birmingham-Exeter Motorway (Warndon Junction 6) Line Order 1990 (S.I. 1990/1724)
- M5 Birmingham–Exeter Motorway (Whittington Junction 7) Connecting Roads Scheme 1990 (S.I. 1990/1725)
- A65 Trunk Road (Heber to Holme House)(De-Trunking) Order 1990 (S.I. 1990/1726)
- A65 Trunk Road (Gargrave Bypass) Order 1990 (S.I. 1990/1727)
- Tryptophan in Food Regulations 1990 (S.I. 1990/1728)
- Housing (Revocation and Modification of Clearance Orders) Order 1990 (S.I. 1990/1729)
- Housing (Prescribed Forms) (No. 2) Regulations 1990 (S.I. 1990/1730)
- Child Resistant Packaging (Safety) (Amendment) Regulations 1990 (S.I. 1990/1736)
- Plant Health (Great Britain) (Amendment) Order 1990 (S.I. 1990/1741)
- National Health Service (Service Committees and Tribunal) Amendment (No.2) Regulations 1990 (S.I. 1990/1752)
- National Health Service (Fund-holding Practices) (Applications and Recognition) Regulations 1990 (S.I. 1990/1753)
- National Health Service (Fund-Holding Practices) (Applications and Recognition) (Scotland) Regulations 1990 (S.I. 1990/1754)
- National Health Service (Determination of Regions and Districts) Amendment Order 1990 (S.I. 1990/1755)
- National Health Service (District Health Authorities) Order 1990 (S.I. 1990/1756)
- National Health Service (General Medical and Pharmaceutical Services) Amendment (No. 2) Regulations 1990 (S.I. 1990/1757)
- Regional and District Health Authorities (Membership and Procedure) Amendment Regulations 1990 (S.I. 1990/1758)
- Public Telecommunication System Designation (Cambridge Cable Limited) (Cambridge) Order 1990 (S.I. 1990/1759)
- Prison (Amendment) Rules 1990 (S.I. 1990/1762)
- Young Offender Institution (Amendment) Rules 1990 (S.I. 1990/1763)
- County Court (Amendment No. 3) Rules 1990 (S.I. 1990/1764)
- Local Government Reorganisation (Miscellaneous Provisions) Order 1990 (S.I. 1990/1765)
- Companies (Forms Amendment No. 2 and Company's Type and Principal Business Activities) Regulations 1990 (S.I. 1990/1766)
- Export of Goods (Control) (Amendment No. 5) Order 1990 (S.I. 1990/1767)
- Iraq and Kuwait (United Nations Sanctions) (Amendment) Order 1990 (S.I. 1990/1768)
- Iraq and Kuwait (United Nations Sanctions)(Bermuda) Order 1990 (S.I. 1990/1769)
- Iraq and Kuwait (United Nations Sanctions) (Dependent Territories) (Amendment) Order 1990 (S.I. 1990/1770)
- Iraq and Kuwait (United Nations Sanctions) (Channel Islands) Order 1990 (S.I. 1990/1771)
- National Health Service (General Dental Services) (Miscellaneous Amendments) (Scotland) Regulations 1990 (S.I. 1990/1772)
- Community Charge Benefits (General) Amendment (No. 3) Regulations 1990 (S.I. 1990/1773)
- Family Credit (General) Amendment No. 2 Regulations 1990 (S.I. 1990/1774)
- Housing Benefit (General) Amendment (No. 2) Regulations 1990 (S.I. 1990/1775)
- Income Support (General) Amendment No. 3 Regulations 1990 (S.I. 1990/1776)
- Income Support (Liable Relatives) Regulations 1990 (S.I. 1990/1777)
- Social Security (Contributions) Amendment (No. 3) Regulations 1990 (S.I. 1990/1779)
- Petty Sessional Divisions (Essex) Order 1990 (S.I. 1990/1780)
- Petty Sessional Divisions (Wigan) Order 1990 (S.I. 1990/1781)
- Local Government (Direct Labour Organisations) (Competition) (Scotland) Regulations 1990 (S.I. 1990/1782)
- Local Government (Direct Labour Organisations) (Specified Number of Employed Persons) (Scotland) Order 1990 (S.I. 1990/1783)
- Dolgellau—South of Birkenhead Trunk Road (A 494)(Mold By-Pass) Order 1990 (S.I. 1990/1786)
- Social Fund (Miscellaneous Provisions) Regulations 1990 (S.I. 1990/1788)
- Food Protection (Emergency Prohibitions) (Copper or Other Metal Poisoning) (England) Order 1990 (S.I. 1990/1789)
- A423 Trunk Road (Sandford on Thames) Detrunking Order 1990 (S.I. 1990/1790)
- Home Energy Efficiency Grants Regulations 1990 (S.I. 1990/1791)
- Tryptophan in Food (Scotland) Regulations 1990 (S.I. 1990/1792)
- National Health Service and Community Care Act 1990 (Commencement No.3 and Transitional Provisions) (Scotland) Order 1990 (S.I. 1990/1793)
- Public Telecommunications System Designation (Mid Downs Cable Limited) (Crawley, Horley and Gatwick Airport) Order 1990 (S.I. 1990/1797)
- Public Telecommunication System Designation (Herts Cable Limited) (West Hertfordshire) Order 1990 (S.I. 1990/1798)
- Trade Marks and Service Marks(Amendment) (No. 2) Rules 1990 (S.I. 1990/1799)
- Trade Marks and Service Marks (Fees) Rules 1990 (S.I. 1990/1800)

== 1801–1900 ==
- Trade Marks and Service Marks (Forms) (Amendment) Rules 1990 (S.I. 1990/1801)
- North West Regional Flood Defence Committee (Appointed Day) (No. 2) Order 1990 (S.I. 1990/1806)
- Cosmetic Products (Safety) (Amendment) Regulations 1990 (S.I. 1990/1812)
- Non-Domestic Rating (Alteration of Lists and Appeals) (Amendment) (No. 2) Regulations 1990 (S.I. 1990/1822)
- Assured and Protected Tenancies (Lettings to Students) (Amendment) Regulations 1990 (S.I. 1990/1825)
- Food Protection (Emergency Prohibitions) (Heavy Metal Poisoning) (England) (Revocation) Order 1990 (S.I. 1990/1827)
- Zebra Pedestrian Crossings (Amendment) Regulations 1990 (S.I. 1990/1828)
- Swansea—Manchester Trunk Road (A483) and the Shrewsbury—Dolgellau Trunk Road (A458) (Welshpool North—South Relief Road) (Variation) Order 1990 (S.I. 1990/1830)
- Motor Vehicles (Designation of Approval Marks)(Amendment) Regulations 1990 (S.I. 1990/1838)
- Motor Vehicles (Type Approval) (Great Britain) (Amendment) (No. 2) Regulations 1990 (S.I. 1990/1839)
- Enterprise and New Towns (Scotland) Act 1990 Commencement Order 1990 (S.I. 1990/1840)
- Firemen's Pension Scheme (Amendment) Order 1990 (S.I. 1990/1841)
- National Health Service (Audit of Accounts) (Transitional Provisions) Regulations 1990 (S.I. 1990/1842)
- Isles of Scilly (Variation) Order 1990 (S.I. 1990/1846)
- Goods Vehicles (Operators' Licences, Qualifications and Fees) (Amendment) Regulations 1990 (S.I. 1990/1849)
- Operation of Public Service Vehicles (Partnership) (Amendment) Regulations 1990 (S.I. 1990/1850)
- Public Service Vehicle Operators (Qualifications) Regulations 1990 (S.I. 1990/1851)
- Public Service Vehicles (Operators' Licences) (Amendment) Regulations 1990 (S.I. 1990/1852)
- Annual Close Time (Rivers Irvine and Garnock Salmon Fishery District) Order 1990 (S.I. 1990/1854)
- Authorities for London Post-Graduate Teaching Hospitals (Constitution) Amendment Order 1990 (S.I. 1990/1855)
- Education (Training Grants) Regulations 1990 (S.I. 1990/1857)
- Public Telecommunication System Designation (Devon Cablevision Limited) (South Devon) Order 1990 (S.I. 1990/1858)
- Electricity (Non-Fossil Fuel Sources) (England and Wales) (No. 2) Order 1990 (S.I. 1990/1859)
- A516 Trunk Road (Etwall Bypass) Order 1990 (S.I. 1990/1864)
- A516 Trunk Road (Etwall Bypass) (Detrunking) Order 1990 (S.I. 1990/1865)
- Bovine Animals (Identification, Marking and Breeding Records) Order 1990 (S.I. 1990/1867)
- Movement of Animals (Records) (Amendment) Order 1990 (S.I. 1990/1868)
- Tuberculosis (England and Wales) (Amendment) Order 1990 (S.I. 1990/1869)
- Time Off for Public Duties Order 1990 (S.I. 1990/1870)
- Social Security (Attendance Allowance and Claims and Payments) Amendment Regulations 1990 (S.I. 1990/1871)
- Cheshire County Council (Shropshire Union Canal Tunnel, Chester) Scheme 1990 Confirmation Instrument 1990 (S.I. 1990/1872)
- Industrial Training (Construction Board) Order 1964(Amendment) Order 1990 (S.I. 1990/1873)
- A12 Trunk Road (Eastern Avenue, Havering)(Prescribed Routes) Order 1990 (S.I. 1990/1874)
- Public Telecommunication System Designation (City Centre Communications Ltd) (North West London) Order 1990 (S.I. 1990/1888)
- Public Telecommunication System Designation (Leicester Communications Limited) (Leicester and Loughborough) Order 1990 (S.I. 1990/1889)
- Social Security (Categorisation of Earners) Amendment Regulations 1990 (S.I. 1990/1894)

== 1901–2000 ==
- Non-Domestic Rating (Payment of Interest) Regulations 1990 (S.I. 1990/1904)
- Special Hospitals Service Authority (Establishment and Constitution) Amendment Order 1990 (S.I. 1990/1905)
- Health and Safety (Fees) Regulations 1990 (S.I. 1990/1906)
- Tuberculosis (Scotland) Amendment Order 1990 (S.I. 1990/1908)
- Magistrates' Courts (Social Security Act 1986) (Transfer of Orders to maintain and Enforcement of Maintenance Orders) Rules 1990 (S.I. 1990/1909)
- Nuclear Installations Act 1965 (Repeal and Modifications) Regulations 1990 (S.I. 1990/1918)
- Combined Probation Areas (Lincolnshire)Order 1990 (S.I. 1990/1919)
- Oxfordshire County Council (Wallingford Bypass River Thames Bridge) Scheme 1989 Confirmation Instrument 1990 (S.I. 1990/1920)
- Gipsy Encampments (Borough of Hertsmere) Order 1990 (S.I. 1990/1927)
- Gipsy Encampments (District of East Cambridgeshire) Order 1990 (S.I. 1990/1928)
- Gipsy Encampments (London Borough of Harrow) Order 1990 (S.I. 1990/1929)
- Bovine Spongiform Encephalopathy (No. 2) Amendment Order 1990 (S.I. 1990/1930)
- Social Security (Contributions) Amendment (No.4) Regulations 1990 (S.I. 1990/1935)
- Export of Sheep (Prohibition) (No. 2) Amendment No. 3 Order 1990 (S.I. 1990/1936)
- Food Protection (Emergency Prohibitions) (England) Amendment No. 4 Order 1990 (S.I. 1990/1937)
- National Health Service (General Dental Services) (Miscellaneous Amendments) (No. 2) Regulations 1990 (S.I. 1990/1938)
- National Health Service (General Dental Services) (Miscellaneous Amendments) (Scotland) (No.2) Regulations 1990 (S.I. 1990/1940)
- Borough of Burnley (Electoral Arrangements) Order 1990 (S.I. 1990/1941)
- Social Security Act 1990 (Commencement No. 2) Order 1990 (S.I. 1990/1942)
- Value Added Tax (Cash Accounting) (Amendment) (No. 2) Regulations 1990 (S.I. 1990/1943)
- Food Protection (Emergency Prohibitions)(Wales) (No. 5) Amendment No. 4 Order 1990 (S.I. 1990/1948)
- Food Protection (Emergency Prohibitions) Amendment (No. 4) Order 1990 (S.I. 1990/1949)
- Local Government Reorganisation (Property)(West Midlands) Order 1990 (S.I. 1990/1954)
- Veterinary Surgeons and Veterinary Practitioners (Disciplinary Committee) (Procedure and Evidence) (Amendment) Rules Order of Council 1990 (S.I. 1990/1959)
- Import and Export (Plant Health Fees) (Scotland) Order 1990 (S.I. 1990/1960)
- East Anglian, Essex and York (Pipelaying and Other Works) (Codes of Practice) Order 1990 (S.I. 1990/1965)
- Partnership (Unrestricted Size) No. 7 Regulations 1990 (S.I. 1990/1969)
- Public Telecommunication System Designation(Derbyshire Cablevision Limited) (Derby) Order 1990 (S.I. 1990/1970)
- River Don Catchment Area (Part) Protection Order 1990 (S.I. 1990/1971)
- Act of Sederunt (Registration Appeal Court) 1990 (S.I. 1990/1972)
- British Railways (Penalty Fares) Act 1989 (Activating No. 1) Order 1990 (S.I. 1990/1973)
- Commission for the New Towns (Specified Date) (Tenancies) Order 1990 (S.I. 1990/1980)
- Road Vehicles (Construction and Use) (Amendment) (No. 4) Regulations 1990 (S.I. 1990/1981)
- Trustee Savings Banks Act 1985 (Appointed Day)(No. 7) Order 1990 (S.I. 1990/1982)
- Food Protection (Emergency Prohibitions) (Lead in Cattle) (England) (Revocation) Order 1990 (S.I. 1990/1983)
- Fire Safety and Safety of Places of Sport Act 1987 (Commencement No. 6) Order 1990 (S.I. 1990/1984)
- Merchant Shipping (Medical Examination) (Amendment) Regulations 1990 (S.I. 1990/1985)
- Personal Community Charge (Students)(Amendment) Regulations 1990 (S.I. 1990/1986)
- Iraq and Kuwait (United Nations Sanctions) (No. 2) Order 1990 (S.I. 1990/1987)
- Iraq and Kuwait (United Nations Sanctions) (Dependent Territories) (No. 2) Order 1990 (S.I. 1990/1988)
- Education (Grant) Regulations 1990 (S.I. 1990/1989)

== 2001–2100 ==
- London Cab (No. 2) Order 1990 (S.I. 1990/2003)
- Revenue Support Grant (Specified Bodies) Regulations 1990 (S.I. 1990/2004)
- Copyright (Certification of Licensing Scheme for Educational Recording of Broadcasts) (Guild Sound and Vision Limited) (Revocation) Order 1990 (S.I. 1990/2007)
- Copyright (Certification of Licensing Scheme for Educational Recording of Broadcasts) (Open University Educational Enterprises Limited) Order 1990 (S.I. 1990/2008)
- Public Telecommunication System Designation(Cable Television Limited) (Borough of Northampton) Order 1990 (S.I. 1990/2011)
- Welfare Food Amendment (No. 3) Regulations 1990 (S.I. 1990/2012)
- A421 Trunk Road (Wendlebury to Bicester Section, Slip Roads) Order 1990 (S.I. 1990/2015)
- Civil List (Increase of Financial Provision) Order 1990 (S.I. 1990/2018)
- Annual Close Time (River Tay Salmon Fishery District) Order 1990 (S.I. 1990/2020)
- Occupational Pension Schemes (Modification) Regulations 1990 (S.I. 1990/2021)
- Charging Authorities (Notification of Precept Population) (Wales) (Amendment) Regulations 1990 (S.I. 1990/2022)
- Charging Authorities (Population for Precepts) (Wales) (Amendment) Regulations 1990 (S.I. 1990/2023)
- National Health Service Trusts (Membership and Procedure) Regulations 1990 (S.I. 1990/2024)
- Non-Domestic Rating (Alteration of Lists and Appeals) (Amendment) (No. 3) Regulations 1990 (S.I. 1990/2025)
- Control of Substances Hazardous to Health (Amendment) Regulations 1990 (S.I. 1990/2026)
- Fees for Inquiries (Standard Daily Amount) Regulations 1990 (S.I. 1990/2027)
- Land Registration Fees (No. 2) Order 1990 (S.I. 1990/2029)
- Education (Eligibility of Primary Schools for Grant-maintained Status) Order 1990 (S.I. 1990/2031)
- Town and Country Planning General Development (Amendment) (No. 2) Order 1990 (S.I. 1990/2032)
- International Carriage of Perishable Foodstuffs (Amendment) Regulations 1990 (S.I. 1990/2033)
- Food Protection (Emergency Prohibitions)(Copper or Other Metal Poisoning) (England) (Revocation) Order 1990 (S.I. 1990/2034)
- Overhead Lines (Exemption) Regulations 1990 (S.I. 1990/2035)
- Value Added Tax (Insurance) Order 1990 (S.I. 1990/2037)
- Industrial Training (Clothing and Allied Products Board) (Revocation) Order 1990 (S.I. 1990/2038)
- Local Government Act 1988 (Defined Activities) (Exemption) (England) (No. 3) Order 1990 (S.I. 1990/2039)
- The South Hams (Parishes) Order 1990 S.I. 1990/2040
- Sea Fish (Specified Manx Waters) Licensing Order 1990 (S.I. 1990/2051)
- Sea Fishing (Specified Western Waters) (Restrictions on Landing) Order 1990 (S.I. 1990/2052)
- Deposit Protection Board (Increase of Borrowing Limit) (No. 2) Order 1990 (S.I. 1990/2064)
- Occupational Pension Schemes (Independent Trustee) Regulations 1990 (S.I. 1990/2075)
- London—Brighton Trunk Road (A23 Bolney Flyover Slip Roads) Order 1990 (S.I. 1990/2080)
- Local Government Act 1988 (Defined Activities) (Competition) (England) (Amendment) Regulations 1990 (S.I. 1990/2082)
- Police Cadets (Scotland) Amendment (No.2) Regulations 1990 (S.I. 1990/2083)
- Criminal Justice Act 1988 (Commencement No. 12) Order 1990 (S.I. 1990/2084)
- Jam and Similar Products (Amendment) Regulations 1990 (S.I. 1990/2085)
- Petty Sessional Divisions (Cornwall) Order 1990 (S.I. 1990/2099)
- Petty Sessional Divisions (Somerset) Order 1990 (S.I. 1990/2100)

== 2101–2200 ==
- Retirement Benefits Schemes (Continuation of Rights of Members of Approved Schemes) Regulations 1990 (S.I. 1990/2101)
- Testing in Primary Schools (Scotland) Regulations 1990 (S.I. 1990/2104)
- Act of Sederunt (Amendment of Sheriff Court Ordinary Cause, Summary Cause, and Small Claim, Rules) (No.2) 1990 (S.I. 1990/2105)
- Act of Adjournal (Consolidation Amendment No.2) (Miscellaneous) 1990 (S.I. 1990/2106)
- A1 Trunk Road (Gatenby Lane Junction, Leeming Slip Roads) Order 1990 (S.I. 1990/2112)
- Finance Act 1985 (Interest on Tax) (Prescribed Rate)(No. 2) Order 1990 (S.I. 1990/2113)
- A5 London—Holyhead Trunk Road (Little Brickhill Bypass and Slip Roads) Order 1990 (S.I. 1990/2114)
- A5 London—Holyhead Trunk Road (Little Brickhill) Detrunking Order 1990 (S.I. 1990/2115)
- Act of Sederunt (Applications under section 57C of the Social Security Pensions Act 1975) 1990 (S.I. 1990/2116)
- Offshore Installations (Safety Zones) (No. 6) Order 1990 (S.I. 1990/2117)
- Act of Sederunt (Rules of the Court of Session Amendment No.5) (Miscellaneous) 1990 (S.I. 1990/2118)
- Merchant Shipping (Load Line) (Amendment) Rules 1990 (S.I. 1990/2128)
- Value Added Tax (Charities) (No. 2) Order 1990 (S.I. 1990/2129)
- European Bank for Reconstruction and Development (Immunities and Privileges) Order 1990 (S.I. 1990/2142)
- European Communities (Designation) (No. 3)Order 1990 (S.I. 1990/2143)
- Iraq and Kuwait (United Nations Sanctions)(Second Amendment) Order 1990 (S.I. 1990/2144)
- Civil Aviation Act 1982 (Jersey) Order 1990 (S.I. 1990/2145)
- Education (Unrecognised Degrees) (Guernsey) Order 1990 (S.I. 1990/2146)
- Fishing Vessels (Life-Saving Appliances) (Guernsey) Order 1990 (S.I. 1990/2147)
- Fishing Vessels (Safety Provisions) (Guernsey)Order 1990 (S.I. 1990/2148)
- Local Government Boundaries Commissioner (Northern Ireland) Order 1990 (S.I. 1990/2149)
- Merchant Shipping (Safety Convention) (Guernsey) Order 1990 (S.I. 1990/2150)
- Prevention of Terrorism (Temporary Provisions) Act 1984 (Isle of Man) (Revocation) Order 1990 (S.I. 1990/2151)
- Double Taxation Relief (Taxes on Income) (Netherlands) Order 1990 (S.I. 1990/2152)
- Copyright (Application to Other Countries) (No. 2) (Amendment) Order 1990 (S.I. 1990/2153)
- Air Navigation (Amendment) Order 1990 (S.I. 1990/2154)
- Criminal Appeal (Amendment) Rules 1990 (S.I. 1990/2156)
- Crown Court (Amendment) Rules 1990 (S.I. 1990/2157)
- Credit Cards (Merchant Acquisition) Order 1990 (S.I. 1990/2158)
- Credit Cards (Price Discrimination) Order 1990 (S.I. 1990/2159)
- National Health Service Trusts(Membership and Procedure) Amendment Regulations 1990 (S.I. 1990/2160)
- Nursing Homes and Mental Nursing Homes (Amendment) Regulations 1990 (S.I. 1990/2164)
- Human Fertilisation and Embryology Act 1990 (Commencement No. 1) Order 1990 (S.I. 1990/2165)
- Channel Tunnel (Customs and Excise) Order 1990 (S.I. 1990/2167)
- Copyright, Designs and Patents Act 1988 (Commencement No. 6) Order 1990 (S.I. 1990/2168)
- Public Telecommunication System Designation(Coastal Cablevision of Dorset Ltd) (West Dorset)Order 1990 (S.I. 1990/2169)
- Courts and Legal Services Act 1990 (Commencement No. 1) Order 1990 (S.I. 1990/2170)
- Mid Southern, Northumbrian and Southern (Pipelaying and Other Works) (Codes of Practice) Order 1990 (S.I. 1990/2171)
- Newcastle and Gateshead Water (Constitution and Regulation) Order 1990 (S.I. 1990/2177)
- Sunderland and South Shields (Constitution and Regulation) Order 1990 (S.I. 1990/2178)
- Building Standards (Scotland) Regulations 1990 (S.I. 1990/2179)
- Jam and Similar Products (Scotland) Amendment Regulations 1990 (S.I. 1990/2180)
- Electricity (Amendment of Scottish Pension Schemes) Regulations 1990 (S.I. 1990/2181)
- River Nairn Salmon Fishery District (Baits and Lures) Regulations 1990 (S.I. 1990/2182)
- Road Vehicles (Registration and Licensing) (Amendment) Regulations 1990 (S.I. 1990/2185)
- Road Vehicles (Registration and Licensing) (Amendment) Regulations (Northern Ireland) 1990 (S.I. 1990/2186)
- Education (National Curriculum) (Exceptions) (Wales) Regulations 1990 (S.I. 1990/2187)
- Winchester—Preston Trunk Road (A34) (Stratford-upon-Avon) De-Trunking Order 1990 (S.I. 1990/2188)
- London-Portsmouth Trunk Road (A3 Milford Bypass and Slip Roads) Order 1990 (S.I. 1990/2189)
- London—Portsmouth Trunk Road (A3 Milford De-Trunking) (No. 2) Order 1990 (S.I. 1990/2190)
- London—Portsmouth Trunk Road (A3 Milford De-Trunking) Order 1990 (S.I. 1990/2191)
- Public Telecommunication System Designation (Jones Cable Group of South Hertfordshire Limited) Order 1990 (S.I. 1990/2192)

== 2201–2300 ==
- (A69) Carlisle-Sunderland Trunk Road (Derwenthaugh to Scotswood Road De-Trunking) Order 1986 Amendment Order 1990 (S.I. 1990/2201)
- Edinburgh College of Art (Amendment) Order 1990 (S.I. 1990/2202)
- Building Societies (Investigation of Complaints) Order 1990 (S.I. 1990/2203)
- Medicines (Pharmacies) (Applications for Registration and Fees) Amendment Regulations 1990 (S.I. 1990/2204)
- Social Security (Miscellaneous Provisions)Amendment Regulations 1990 (S.I. 1990/2208)
- Social Security (Severe Disablement Allowance) Amendment Regulations 1990 (S.I. 1990/2209)
- British Nationality (Hong Kong) Act 1990 (Commencement) Order 1990 (S.I. 1990/2210)
- British Nationality (Hong Kong) (Registration of Citizens) Regulations 1990 (S.I. 1990/2211)
- Road Vehicles (Construction and Use) (Amendment) (No. 5) Regulations 1990 (S.I. 1990/2212)
- Veterinary Surgery (Blood Sampling) (Amendment) Order 1990 (S.I. 1990/2217)
- National Health Service and Community Care Act 1990 (Commencement No. 4 and Transitional Provision) Order 1990 (S.I. 1990/2218)
- Housing (Change of Landlord) (Payment of Disposal Cost by Instalments) (Amendment) Regulations 1990 (S.I. 1990/2219)
- Environmental Protection Act 1990 (Commencement No. 1) Order 1990 (S.I. 1990/2226)
- Channel Tunnel (Fire Services, Immigration and Prevention of Terrorism) Order 1990 (S.I. 1990/2227)
- Road Traffic (Driver Licensing and Information Systems) Act 1989 (Commencement No. 3) Order 1990 (S.I. 1990/2228)
- National Health Service (Local Health Councils) (Scotland) Regulations 1990 (S.I. 1990/2230)
- Income Tax (Building Societies) (Dividends and Interest) Regulations 1990 (S.I. 1990/2231)
- Income Tax (Deposit-takers) (Interest Payments)Regulations 1990 (S.I. 1990/2232)
- Town and Country Planning (Isles of Scilly) Order 1990 (S.I. 1990/2233)
- Financial Services Act 1986 (Electricity Industry Exemptions) (No. 2) Order 1990 (S.I. 1990/2235)
- Land Registration (Solicitor to H M Land Registry) Regulations 1990 (S.I. 1990/2236)
- Planning (Listed Buildings and Conservation Areas) (Isles of Scilly) Order 1990 (S.I. 1990/2237)
- Act of Sederunt (Applications under the Social Security Act 1986) 1990 (S.I. 1990/2238)
- Rules of the Air Regulations 1990 (S.I. 1990/2241)
- Housing (Grants for Fire Escapes in Houses in Multiple Occupation) (Prescribed Percentage) (Scotland) Order 1990 (S.I. 1990/2242)
- Environmental Protection Act 1990 (Commencement No. 2) Order 1990 (S.I. 1990/2243)
- Local Authority Social Services (Complaints Procedure) Order 1990 (S.I. 1990/2244)
- Water Byelaws (Milngavie Waterworks, Loch Katrine, Loch Arklet, Glen Finglas) Extension Order 1990 (S.I. 1990/2250)
- Government Stock (Amendment)Regulations 1990 (S.I. 1990/2253)
- Education (Schools and Further Education) (Amendment) Regulations 1990 (S.I. 1990/2259)
- Magistrates' Courts (Civilian Fine Enforcement Officers) (No. 2) Rules 1990 (S.I. 1990/2260)
- Social Security (Industrial Injuries)(Prescribed Diseases) Amendment Regulations 1990 (S.I. 1990/2269)
- Public Telecommunication System Designation (Cable Hackney and Islington Limited) Order 1990 (S.I. 1990/2270)
- Public Telecommunication System Designation (Southdown Cablevision Limited) Order 1990 (S.I. 1990/2271)
- Offshore Installations (Safety Zones) (No. 7) Order 1990 (S.I. 1990/2275)
- Statutory Nuisance (Appeals) Regulations 1990 (S.I. 1990/2276)
- Occupational and Personal Pension Schemes (Levy) Regulations 1990 (S.I. 1990/2277)
- Register of Occupational and Personal Pension Schemes Regulations 1990 (S.I. 1990/2278)
- Education (Grant-maintained Schools) (Finance) (Amendment) Regulations 1990 (S.I. 1990/2279)
- Local Government Act 1988 (Defined Activities)(Competition) (Wales) (No. 2) Regulations 1990 (S.I. 1990/2280)
- Local Government Act 1988 (Defined Activities) (Competition) (Scotland) Amendment Regulations 1990 (S.I. 1990/2286)
- A47 Trunk Road (East Dereham to North Tuddenham Improvement) Order 1990 (S.I. 1990/2287)
- Child Abduction and Custody (Parties to Conventions) (Amendment) Order 1990 (S.I. 1990/2289)
- European Commission and Court of Human Rights (Immunities and Privileges) (Amendment) Order 1990 (S.I. 1990/2290)
- Protection of Trading Interests Act 1980 (Hong Kong) Order 1990 (S.I. 1990/2291)
- British Nationality (Hong Kong) (Selection Scheme) Order 1990 (S.I. 1990/2292)
- Copyright, Designs and Patents Act 1988 (Isle of Man) (No. 2) Order 1990 (S.I. 1990/2293)
- Horses (Protective Headgear for Young Riders) (Northern Ireland) Order 1990 (S.I. 1990/2294)
- Patents Act 1977 (Isle of Man) (Variation)Order 1990 (S.I. 1990/2295)
- Prevention of Terrorism (Temporary Provisions) Act 1984 (Guernsey) (Revocation) Order 1990 (S.I. 1990/2296)
- Judicial Committee (General Appellate Jurisdiction) Rules (Amendment) Order 1990 (S.I. 1990/2297)
- Parliamentary Constituencies (Scotland) (Miscellaneous Changes) Order 1990 (S.I. 1990/2298)
- A27 Trunk Road (Crossbush Bypass) Order 1990 (S.I. 1990/2299)
- A27 Trunk Road (Crossbush Bypass Detrunking) Order 1990 (S.I. 1990/2300)

== 2301–2400 ==
- A27 Trunk Road (Crossbush Bypass Slip Roads) Order 1990 (S.I. 1990/2301)
- Social Fund Cold Weather Payments (General) Amendment Regulations 1990 (S.I. 1990/2302)
- Crown Agents (Additional Powers) Order 1990 (S.I. 1990/2303)
- Plaice (Specified Sea Areas) (Prohibition of Fishing) Order 1990 (S.I. 1990/2304)
- Occupational Pensions (Revaluation) Order 1990 (S.I. 1990/2315)
- Portsmouth, Severn Trent and Wessex (Pipelaying and Other Works) (Codes of Practice) Order 1990 (S.I. 1990/2318)
- Crown Office Fees Order 1990 (S.I. 1990/2319)
- Income Support (General and Transitional) Amendment Regulations 1990 (S.I. 1990/2324)
- Control of Industrial Major Accident Hazards (Amendment) Regulations 1990 (S.I. 1990/2325)
- Medicines (Fees Relating to Medicinal Products for Human Use) Amendment (No. 2) Regulations 1990 (S.I. 1990/2326)
- Law Reform (Miscellaneous Provisions) (Scotland) Act 1990 Commencement (No.1) Order 1990 (S.I. 1990/2328)
- Non-Domestic Rating (Transitional Period) (Amendment and Further Provision) Regulations 1990 (S.I. 1990/2329)
- Guarantee Payments (Exemption) (No. 28)Order 1990 (S.I. 1990/2330)
- Motor Vehicles (Driving Licences) (Amendment) (No. 5) Regulations 1990 (S.I. 1990/2334)
- Care of Cathedrals Rules 1990 (S.I. 1990/2335)
- Agricultural or Forestry Tractors and Tractor Components (Type Approval) (Amendment) Regulations 1990 (S.I. 1990/2336)
- Conservation of Seals (Common Seals) (Shetland Islands Area) Order 1990 (S.I. 1990/2337)
- Conservation of Seals (England) Order 1990 (S.I. 1990/2338)
- M20 Motorway (A249 Sittingbourne Road) Connecting Roads Scheme 1990 (S.I. 1990/2341)
- M20 Motorway (Chrismill Bridge Section)Scheme 1990 (S.I. 1990/2342)
- M20 Motorway (Coldharbour Lane to Sandling Section) Connecting Roads Scheme 1990 (S.I. 1990/2343)
- M20 Motorway (Medway Bridge Section)Scheme 1990 (S.I. 1990/2344)
- Oil Pollution (Compulsory Insurance) (Amendment) (No. 2) Regulations 1990 (S.I. 1990/2345)
- A16 Trunk Road (Ludborough Bypass) Order 1990 (S.I. 1990/2346)
- Broadcasting Act 1990 (Commencement No. 1 and Transitional Provisions) Order 1990 (S.I. 1990/2347)
- Electricity (Restrictive Trade Practices Act 1976) (Exemptions) (No. 4) Order 1990 (S.I. 1990/2348)
- Peak Rail Light Railway Order 1990 (S.I. 1990/2350)
- Education (School Premises) (Amendment)Regulations 1990 (S.I. 1990/2351)
- International Monetary Fund (Increase in Subscription) Order 1990 (S.I. 1990/2352)
- Aberdeen Harbour Revision Order 1990 (S.I. 1990/2359)
- Public Lending Right Scheme 1982 (Commencement of Variations) Order 1990 (S.I. 1990/2360)
- Tax-exempt Special Savings Account Regulations 1990 (S.I. 1990/2361)
- Building Societies (Aggregation) Rules 1990 (S.I. 1990/2362)
- Building Societies (Non-Retail Funds and Deposits) Order 1990 (S.I. 1990/2363)
- Building Societies (Accounts and Related Provisions) (Amendment) Regulations 1990 (S.I. 1990/2364)
- Goods Vehicles (Authorisation of International Journeys) (Fees) (Amendment) Regulations 1990 (S.I. 1990/2365)
- New Towns (Transfer of Housing Stock) (Amendment) Regulations 1990 (S.I. 1990/2366)
- Local Statutory Provisions (Postponement of Repeal) (Scotland) Order 1990 (S.I. 1990/2370)
- Channel Tunnel (Amendment of Agriculture, Fisheries and Food Import Legislation) Order 1990 (S.I. 1990/2371)
- Food Safety Act 1990 (Commencement No. 2) Order 1990 (S.I. 1990/2372)
- Army Terms of Service (Amendment) Regulations 1990 (S.I. 1990/2373)
- Royal Air Force Terms of Service (Amendment) Regulations 1990 (S.I. 1990/2374)
- Public Telecommunication System Designation (Harrogate Telecommunications Complex Limited) Order 1990 (S.I. 1990/2375)
- Public Telecommunication System Designation (York Telecommunications Complex Limited) Order 1990 (S.I. 1990/2376)
- Electrical Equipment for Explosive Atmospheres (Certification) (Amendment) Regulations 1990 (S.I. 1990/2377)
- Employment Act 1990 (Commencement and Transitional Provisions) Order 1990 (S.I. 1990/2378)
- Funds for Trade Union Ballots (Amendment) Regulations 1990 (S.I. 1990/2379)
- Local Government (Compensation for Redundancy and Premature Retirement) (Amendment) Regulations 1990 (S.I. 1990/2380)
- A16 Trunk Road (Stickford Bypass) Order 1990 (S.I. 1990/2382)
- A16 Trunk Road (Stickford Bypass) (Detrunking) Order 1990 (S.I. 1990/2383)
- Patents Rules 1990 (S.I. 1990/2384)
- Motor Vehicles (Driving Licences) (Amendment) (No. 6) Regulations 1990 (S.I. 1990/2385)
- Central Institutions (Recognition) (Scotland) (No.2) Regulations 1990 (S.I. 1990/2386)
- Glasgow College of Technology and Robert Gordon's Institute of Technology (Change of Name) Regulations 1990 (S.I. 1990/2387)
- Broadcasting (Number of Houses in an Area for Purposes of Diffusion Service Licence) Order 1990 (S.I. 1990/2388)
- Broadcasting (Local Delivery Services) Order 1990 (S.I. 1990/2389)
- Housing (Right to Buy) (Priority of Charges) (No. 2) Order 1990 (S.I. 1990/2390)
- Mortgage Indemnities (Recognised Bodies)(No. 2) Order 1990 (S.I. 1990/2391)
- Cream (Heat Treatment) (Scotland) Amendment Regulations 1990 (S.I. 1990/2392)
- Cod (Specified Sea Areas) (Prohibition of Fishing) Order 1990 (S.I. 1990/2394)
- Public Telecommunication System Designation (Cable Communications (Wigan) Limited) Order 1990 (S.I. 1990/2397)
- Plant Health (Forestry) (Great Britain) (Amendment) Order 1990 (S.I. 1990/2398)
- Accommodation of Children (Charge and Control) Amendment Regulations 1990 (S.I. 1990/2399)
- Public Telecommunication System Designation (United Artists Communications (North Thames Estuary) Limited) Order 1990 (S.I. 1990/2400)

== 2401–2500 ==
- Anglian Harbours National Health Service Trust (Establishment) Order 1990 (S.I. 1990/2401)
- Bradford Hospitals National Health Service Trust (Establishment) Order 1990 (S.I. 1990/2402)
- Broadgreen Hospital National Health Service Trust (Establishment) Order 1990 (S.I. 1990/2403)
- Cardiothoracic Centre — Liverpool National Health Service Trust (Establishment) Order 1990 (S.I. 1990/2404)
- Central Middlesex Hospital National Health Service Trust (Establishment) Order 1990 (S.I. 1990/2405)
- Chester and Halton Community National Health Service Trust (Establishment) Order 1990 (S.I. 1990/2406)
- Christie Hospital National Health Service Trust (Establishment) Order 1990 (S.I. 1990/2407)
- Cornwall and Isles of Scilly Mental Handicap National Health Service Trust (Establishment) Order 1990 (S.I. 1990/2408)
- Cornwall Community Healthcare National Health Service Trust (Establishment) Order 1990 (S.I. 1990/2409)
- Croydon Community National Health Service Trust (Establishment) Order 1990 (S.I. 1990/2410)
- Doncaster Royal Infirmary and Montagu Hospital National Health Service Trust (Establishment) Order 1990 (S.I. 1990/2411)
- East Gloucestershire National Health Service Trust (Establishment) Order 1990 (S.I. 1990/2412)
- East Somerset National Health Service Trust (Establishment) Order 1990 (S.I. 1990/2413)
- Epsom Health Care National Health Service Trust (Establishment) Order 1990 (S.I. 1990/2414)
- First Community National Health Service Trust (Establishment) Order 1990 (S.I. 1990/2415)
- Freeman Group of Hospitals National Health Service Trust (Establishment) Order 1990 (S.I. 1990/2416)
- Guy's and Lewisham National Health Service Trust (Establishment) Order 1990 (S.I. 1990/2417)
- Hillingdon Hospital National Health Service Trust (Establishment) Order 1990 (S.I. 1990/2418)
- Homewood National Health Service Trust (Establishment) Order 1990 (S.I. 1990/2419)
- Kingston Hospital National Health Service Trust (Establishment) Order 1990 (S.I. 1990/2420)
- Leeds General Infirmary and Associated Hospitals National Health Service Trust (Establishment) Order 1990 (S.I. 1990/2421)
- Lifecare National Health Service Trust (Establishment) Order 1990 (S.I. 1990/2422)
- Lincolnshire Ambulance and Health Transport Service National Health Service Trust (Establishment) Order 1990 (S.I. 1990/2423)
- Manchester Central Hospitals and Community Care National Health Service Trust (Establishment) Order 1990 (S.I. 1990/2424)
- Mental Health Foundation of Mid Staffordshire National Health Service Trust (Establishment) Order 1990 (S.I. 1990/2425)
- Mid Cheshire Hospitals National Health Service Trust (Establishment) Order 1990 (S.I. 1990/2426)
- Mount Vernon Hospital National Health Service Trust (Establishment) Order 1990 (S.I. 1990/2427)
- Newcastle Mental Health National Health Service Trust (Establishment) Order 1990 (S.I. 1990/2428)
- Norfolk Ambulance National Health Service Trust (Establishment) Order 1990 (S.I. 1990/2429)
- North Hertfordshire National Health Service Trust (Establishment) Order 1990 (S.I. 1990/2430)
- North Middlesex Hospital National Health Service Trust (Establishment) Order 1990 (S.I. 1990/2431)
- Northern General Hospital National Health Service Trust (Establishment) Order 1990 (S.I. 1990/2432)
- Northumbria Ambulance Service National Health Service Trust (Establishment) Order 1990 (S.I. 1990/2433)
- Nuffield Orthopaedic Centre National Health Service Trust (Establishment) Order 1990 (S.I. 1990/2434)
- Royal Free Hampstead National Health Service Trust (Establishment) Order 1990 (S.I. 1990/2435)
- Royal Liverpool Children's Hospital and Community Services National Health Service Trust (Establishment) Order 1990 (S.I. 1990/2436)
- Royal Liverpool University Hospital National Health Service Trust (Establishment) Order 1990 (S.I. 1990/2437)
- Royal London Hospital and Associated Community Services National Health Service Trust (Establishment) Order 1990 (S.I. 1990/2438)
- Royal National Hospital for Rheumatic Diseases National Health Service Trust (Establishment) Order 1990 (S.I. 1990/2439)
- Royal National Orthopaedic Hospital National Health Service Trust (Establishment) Order 1990 (S.I. 1990/2440)
- Royal National Throat, Nose and Ear Hospital National Health Service Trust (Establishment) Order 1990 (S.I. 1990/2441)
- Royal Surrey County and St. Luke's Hospitals National Health Service Trust (Establishment) Order 1990 (S.I. 1990/2442)
- Rugby National Health Service Trust (Establishment) Order 1990 (S.I. 1990/2443)
- South Devon Health Care National Health Service Trust (Establishment) Order 1990 (S.I. 1990/2444)
- Southend Health Care Services National Health Service Trust (Establishment) Order 1990 (S.I. 1990/2445)
- St. Helens and Knowsley Hospital Services National Health Service Trust (Establishment) Order 1990 (S.I. 1990/2446)
- St. Helier National Health Service Trust (Establishment) Order 1990 (S.I. 1990/2447)
- St. James's University Hospital National Health Service Trust (Establishment) Order 1990 (S.I. 1990/2448)
- Taunton and Somerset National Health Service Trust (Establishment) Order 1990 (S.I. 1990/2449)
- United Bristol Healthcare National Health Service Trust (Establishment) Order 1990 (S.I. 1990/2450)
- Walsall Hospitals National Health Service Trust (Establishment) Order 1990 (S.I. 1990/2451)
- West Dorset Community Health National Health Service Trust (Establishment) Order 1990 (S.I. 1990/2452)
- West Dorset General Hospitals National Health Service Trust (Establishment) Order 1990 (S.I. 1990/2453)
- West Dorset Mental Health National Health Service Trust (Establishment) Order 1990 (S.I. 1990/2454)
- Weston Area National Health Service Trust (Establishment) Order 1990 (S.I. 1990/2455)
- Wirral Hospital National Health Service Trust (Establishment) Order 1990 (S.I. 1990/2456)
- Smoke Control Areas (Exempted Fireplaces) (No. 2) Order 1990 (S.I. 1990/2457)
- Liquor Licensing (Fees) (Scotland) Order 1990 (S.I. 1990/2458)
- Animals (Scientific Procedures) Act (Fees) Order 1990 (S.I. 1990/2459)
- Insurance Brokers Registration Council (Indemnity Insurance and Grants Scheme) (Amendment) Rules Approval Order 1990 (S.I. 1990/2461)
- Food Safety (Enforcement Authority) (England and Wales) Order 1990 (S.I. 1990/2462)
- Food Safety (Sampling and Qualifications) Regulations 1990 (S.I. 1990/2463)
- Local Government Act 1988 (Defined Activities) (Specified Periods) (Inner London) Regulations 1990 (S.I. 1990/2468)
- Petroleum Revenue Tax (Nomination Scheme for Disposals and Appropriations) (Amendment) Regulations 1990 (S.I. 1990/2469)
- Hampshire (Minley Interchange) (M3) Motorway Scheme 1989 Confirmation Instrument 1990 (S.I. 1990/2470)
- Enrolment of Deeds (Change of Name) (Amendment) Regulations 1990 (S.I. 1990/2471)
- Non-Domestic Rating Contributions (England) (Amendment) Regulations 1990 (S.I. 1990/2472)
- Town and Country Planning (Fees for Applications and Deemed Applications) (Amendment) Regulations 1990 Approved by both Houses of ParliamentS.I. 1990/2473)
- Town and Country Planning (Fees for Applications and Deemed Applications) (Scotland) Amendment Regulations 1990 (S.I. 1990/2474)
- Community Charges (Administration and Enforcement) (Amendment) (No. 3) Regulations 1990 (S.I. 1990/2475)
- Parish and Community Councils (Committees)Regulations 1990 (S.I. 1990/2476)
- Local Elections (Parishes and Communities)(Declaration of Acceptance of Office) Order 1990 (S.I. 1990/2477)
- Public Telecommunication System Designation (Fenland Cablevision Limited) Order 1990 (S.I. 1990/2478)
- Public Telecommunication System Designation (South Yorkshire Cablevision Limited) (the Boroughs of Doncaster and Rotherham) Order 1990 (S.I. 1990/2479)
- Local Government Superannuation (Investments) Regulations 1990 (S.I. 1990/2480)
- Sole (Specified Sea Areas) (Prohibition of Fishing) Order 1990 (S.I. 1990/2481)
- Civil Aviation (Route Charges for Navigation Services) (Second Amendment) Regulations 1990 (S.I. 1990/2482)
- Statutory Nuisance (Appeals) (Amendment) Regulations 1990 (S.I. 1990/2483)
- Courts and Legal Services Act 1990 (Commencement No. 2) Order 1990 (S.I. 1990/2484)
- Legal Services Ombudsman (Jurisdiction) Order 1990 (S.I. 1990/2485)
- Food Safety Act 1990 (Consequential Modifications) (England and Wales) Order 1990 (S.I. 1990/2486)
- Food Safety Act 1990 (Consequential Modifications) (No 2) (Great Britain) Order 1990 (S.I. 1990/2487)
- Food Labelling (Amendment) Regulations 1990 (S.I. 1990/2488)
- Food Labelling (Amendment) (Irradiated Food) Regulations 1990 (S.I. 1990/2489)
- Food (Control of Irradiation) Regulations 1990 (S.I. 1990/2490)
- Milk & Dairies (Semi-skimmed and Skimmed Milk) (Heat Treatment and Labelling) (Amendment) Regulations 1990 (S.I. 1990/2491)
- Milk (Special Designation) (Amendment) Regulations 1990 (S.I. 1990/2492)
- Fresh Meat Export (Hygiene and Inspection) (Amendment) Regulations 1990 (S.I. 1990/2493)
- Fresh Meat and Poultry Meat (Hygiene, Inspection and Examinations for Residues) (Charges) Regulations 1990 (S.I. 1990/2494)
- Meat Inspection (Amendment) Regulations 1990 (S.I. 1990/2495)
- Medicines (Veterinary Drugs) (Pharmacy and Merchants' List) (No. 2) (Amendment No. 2) Order 1990 (S.I. 1990/2496)
- National Health Service (General Dental Services) (Scotland) Amendment Regulations 1990 (S.I. 1990/2497)
- Local Government Act 1988 (Defined Activities) (Competition) (Scotland) Amendment (No.2) Regulations 1990 (S.I. 1990/2498)
- Non-Domestic Rating Contributions (Wales) (Amendment) Regulations 1990 (S.I. 1990/2499)
- Conservation of Seals (England) (No. 2) Order 1990 (S.I. 1990/2500)

== 2501–2600 ==
- National Health Service (General Dental Services) Amendment Regulations 1990 (S.I. 1990/2501)
- Marine, & c, Broadcasting (Offences) (Prescribed Areas of the High Seas) Order 1990 (S.I. 1990/2503)
- Radioactive Substances (Appeals) Regulations 1990 (S.I. 1990/2504)
- Food Labelling (Amendment) (Irradiated Food) (Scotland) Regulations 1990 (S.I. 1990/2505)
- Food Labelling (Scotland) Amendment Regulations 1990 (S.I. 1990/2506)
- Milk and Dairies (Scotland) Regulations 1990 (S.I. 1990/2507)
- Milk Labelling (Scotland) Amendment Regulations 1990 (S.I. 1990/2508)
- National Health Service (General Medical and Pharmaceutical Services) (Scotland) Amendment (No.2) Regulations 1990 (S.I. 1990/2509)
- National Health Service and Community Care Act 1990 (Commencement No. 5 and Revocation) (Scotland) Order 1990 (S.I. 1990/2510)
- National Health Service and Community Care Act 1990 (Commencement No. 6—Amendment, and Transitional and Saving Provisions) Order 1990 (S.I. 1990/2511)
- Radioactive Substances (Hospitals) Exemption Order 1990 (S.I. 1990/2512)
- National Health Service (General Medical and Pharmaceutical Services) Amendment (No. 3) Regulations 1990 (S.I. 1990/2513)
- Civil Aviation (Joint Financing) (Second Amendment) Regulations 1990 (S.I. 1990/2514)
- Registration of Births, Deaths and Marriages (Fees) (No. 2) Order 1990 (S.I. 1990/2515)
- Teachers' Pay and Conditions Act 1987(Continuation) Order 1990 (S.I. 1990/2516)
- Patents (Fees) (No. 2) Rules 1990 (S.I. 1990/2517)
- Education Support Grants Regulations 1990 (S.I. 1990/2518)
- Social Work (Representations Procedure) (Scotland) Order 1990 (S.I. 1990/2519)
- A41 Trunk Road (Hendon Way, Barnet) (Speed Limit) Order 1990 (S.I. 1990/2520)
- A27 Trunk Road (Westhampnett Bypass and Slip Roads) Order 1990 (S.I. 1990/2521)
- A27 Trunk Road(Westhampnett Bypass Detrunking) Order 1990 (S.I. 1990/2522)
- Public Telecommunication System Designation (Cable Communications (Barnsley) Limited) Order 1990 (S.I. 1990/2523)
- Lloyd's Underwriters (Schedule 19A to the Income and Corporation Taxes Act 1988) Regulations 1990 (S.I. 1990/2524)
- A17 Trunk Road (Wigtoft—Sutterton Bypass) and the A16 Trunk Road (Diversion at Blackitt's Farm) Order 1990 (S.I. 1990/2525)
- A16 Trunk Road (Blackitt's Farm to Sutterton) Detrunking Order 1990 (S.I. 1990/2526)
- A17 Trunk Road (Wigtoft—Sutterton Bypass) Detrunking Order 1990 (S.I. 1990/2527)
- Sea Fishing (Enforcement of Community Control Measures) (Amendment) Order 1990 (S.I. 1990/2528)
- Debts of Overseas Governments (Determination of Relevant Percentage) Regulations 1990 (S.I. 1990/2529)
- Air Navigation (Dangerous Goods) (Third Amendment) Regulations 1990 (S.I. 1990/2531)
- A1 Trunk Road (Haringey) (Bus Lanes) Red Route Experimental Traffic Order 1990 (S.I. 1990/2532)
- A1 Trunk Road (Haringey) Red Route Experimental Traffic Order 1990 (S.I. 1990/2533)
- A1 Trunk Road (Islington) (Bus Lanes)Red Route Experimental Traffic Order 1990 (S.I. 1990/2534)
- A1 Trunk Road (Islington) Red Route Experimental Traffic Order 1990 (S.I. 1990/2535)
- Broadcasting Act 1990 (Independent Radio Services: Exceptions) Order 1990 (S.I. 1990/2536)
- Broadcasting Act 1990 (Independent Television Services: Exceptions) Order 1990 (S.I. 1990/2537)
- Workmen's Compensation (Supplementation) (Amendment) and the Pneumoconiosis, Byssinosis and Miscellaneous Diseases Benefit (Amendment) Scheme 1990 (S.I. 1990/2538)
- Personal Community Charge (Relief) (Scotland) Amendment (No. 2) Regulations 1990 (S.I. 1990/2539)
- Broadcasting (Transfer Date and Nominated Company) Order 1990 (S.I. 1990/2540)
- A6 London—Inverness Trunk Road(Rothwell Interchange and Slip Roads) Order 1990 (S.I. 1990/2541)
- A43 Oxford—Market Deeping Trunk Road (South West Kettering to Weekley) Detrunking Order 1990 (S.I. 1990/2542)
- A604 Catthorpe—Harwich Trunk Road (Catthorpe to Rothwell Section and Slip Roads) Supplementary Order 1990 (S.I. 1990/2543)
- A604 Catthorpe—Harwich Trunk Road (Catthorpe to Rothwell Section and Slip Roads) Supplementary Order (No. 2) 1990 (S.I. 1990/2544)
- Life Assurance (Apportionment of Receipts of Participating Funds) (Applicable Percentage) (Amendment) Order 1990 (S.I. 1990/2546)
- Stock Transfer (Gilt-edged Securities) (Exempt Transfer) (No. 2) Regulations 1990 (S.I. 1990/2547)
- Value Added Tax (Imported Goods) Relief (Amendment) Order 1990 (S.I. 1990/2548)
- Industrial Training (Hotel and Catering Board) (Revocation) Order 1990 (S.I. 1990/2549)
- Housing Revenue Account General Fund Contribution Limits (Scotland) Order 1990 (S.I. 1990/2550)
- Special Schools (Scotland) Grant Regulations 1990 (S.I. 1990/2551)
- Income Tax (Stock Lending) (Amendment) Regulations 1990 (S.I. 1990/2552)
- Value Added Tax (Construction of Dwellings and Land) Order 1990 (S.I. 1990/2553)
- Sole (Western English Channel) (Prohibition of Fishing) Order 1990 (S.I. 1990/2554)
- Housing Benefit (General) Amendment No. 3 Regulations 1990 (S.I. 1990/2564)
- Environmental Protection Act 1990 (Commencement No. 3) Order 1990 (S.I. 1990/2565)
- Broadcasting Act 1990 (Commencement Date for Complaints under Part V) Order 1990 (S.I. 1990/2566)
- Folkestone, Mid-Sussex and West Kent (Pipelaying and Other Works) (Codes of Practice) Order 1990 (S.I. 1990/2567)
- Companies Act 1989 (Commencement No. 8 and Transitional and Saving Provisions) Order 1990 (S.I. 1990/2569)
- Companies (Revision of Defective Accounts and Report) Regulations 1990 (S.I. 1990/2570)
- Companies (Unregistered Companies) (Amendment No. 3) Regulations 1990 (S.I. 1990/2571)
- Public Telecommunication System Designation (Cable Thames Valley Limited) Order 1990 (S.I. 1990/2572)
- Protection of Wrecks (Designation No. 3) Order 1990 (S.I. 1990/2573)
- East Anglian Water (Constitution and Regulation) Order 1990 (S.I. 1990/2574)
- Damages for Bereavement (Variation of Sum)(England and Wales) Order 1990 (S.I. 1990/2575)
- Damages for Bereavement (Variation of Sum) (Northern Ireland) Order 1990 (S.I. 1990/2576)
- A604 Catthorpe—Harwich Trunk Road (Thrapston to Brampton Section and Slip Roads) Order (No. 2) Supplementary Order 1990 (S.I. 1990/2577)
- Broadcasting Complaints Commission and Control of Misleading Advertisements (Transitional Provisions) Order 1990cS.I. 1990/2579)
- Police and Criminal Evidence Act 1984 (Codes of Practice) (No. 2) Order 1990 (S.I. 1990/2580)
- Local Government and Housing Act 1989 (Commencement No. 10) Order 1990 (S.I. 1990/2581)
- Food Protection (Emergency Prohibitions) (Lead in Cattle) (England) (No. 2) Order 1990 (S.I. 1990/2582)
- National Health Service (Appointment of Consultants) (Wales) Amendment Regulations 1990 (S.I. 1990/2583)
- House of Commons Disqualification Order 1990 (S.I. 1990/2585)
- Consular Fees (Amendment) Order 1990 (S.I. 1990/2586)
- Registrar of British Ships (Gibraltar) (Revocation) Order 1990 (S.I. 1990/2587)
- Criminal Justice (Confiscation)(Northern Ireland) Order 1990 (S.I. 1990/2588)
- Misuse of Drugs Act 1971 (Modification) Order 1990 (S.I. 1990/2589)
- Double Taxation Relief (Taxes on Income) (Italy) Order 1990 (S.I. 1990/2590)
- Civil Jurisdiction and Judgments Act 1982 (Amendment) Order 1990 (S.I. 1990/2591)
- Foreign Marriage (Armed Forces) (Amendment No. 2) Order 1990 (S.I. 1990/2592)
- Trade Marks and Service Marks (Relevant Countries) (Amendment) Order 1990 (S.I. 1990/2593)
- Hovercraft (Application of Enactments) (Amendment) Order 1990 (S.I. 1990/2594)
- Merchant Shipping (Prevention and Control of Pollution) Order 1990 (S.I. 1990/2595)
- Ministerial and other Salaries Order 1990 (S.I. 1990/2596)
- Statistics of Trade Act 1947 (Amendment of Schedule) Order 1990 (S.I. 1990/2597)
- Transfer of Functions (Radioactive Substances) (Wales) Order 1990 (S.I. 1990/2598)
- Building (Amendment of Prescribed Fees) Regulations 1990 (S.I. 1990/2600)

== 2601–2700 ==
- Merchant Shipping (IBC Code) (Amendment) Regulations 1990 (S.I. 1990/2602)
- Merchant Shipping (BCH Code) (Amendment) Regulations 1990 (S.I. 1990/2603)
- Merchant Shipping (Control of Pollution by Noxious Liquid Substances in Bulk) (Amendment) Regulations 1990 (S.I. 1990/2604)
- Merchant Shipping (Dangerous Goods and Marine Pollutants) Regulations 1990 (S.I. 1990/2605)
- Road Traffic (Driver Licensing and Information Systems) Act 1989 (Commencement No. 4) Order 1990 (S.I. 1990/2610)
- Motor Vehicles (Driving Licences) (Heavy Goods and Public Service Vehicles) Regulations 1990 (S.I. 1990/2611)
- Motor Vehicles (Driving Licences) (Large Goods and Passenger-Carrying Vehicles) Regulations 1990 (S.I. 1990/2612)
- Land Registration (Charges) Rules 1990 (S.I. 1990/2613)
- Detention of Food (Prescribed Forms) Regulations 1990 (S.I. 1990/2614)
- Quick-frozen Foodstuffs Regulations 1990 (S.I. 1990/2615)
- A41 London—Birmingham Trunk Road (Berkhamsted Bypass Slip Road) Order 1990 (S.I. 1990/2616)
- Police Cadets (Amendment No. 2) Regulations 1990 (S.I. 1990/2618)
- Police (Amendment No. 4) Regulations 1990 (S.I. 1990/2619)
- Firearms (Amendment) Act 1988 (Commencement No. 3) Order 1990 (S.I. 1990/2620)
- Firearms (Removal to Northern Ireland) Order 1990 (S.I. 1990/2621)
- Roads (Scotland) Act 1984 (Commencement No.3) Order 1990 (S.I. 1990/2622)
- Road Humps (Scotland) Regulations 1990 (S.I. 1990/2623)
- Law Reform (Miscellaneous Provisions) (Scotland) Act 1990 (Commencement No. 2) Order 1990 (S.I. 1990/2624)
- Food Safety Act 1990 (Consequential Modifications) (Scotland) Order 1990 (S.I. 1990/2625)
- Weights and Measures (Local and Working Standard Capacity Measures and Testing Equipment) Regulations 1990 (S.I. 1990/2626)
- Welfare of Horses at Markets (and Other Places of Sale) Order 1990 (S.I. 1990/2627)
- Welfare of Animals at Markets Order 1990 (S.I. 1990/2628)
- Misuse of Drugs (Amendment) Regulations 1990 (S.I. 1990/2630)
- Misuse of Drugs (Designation) (Variation) Order 1990 (S.I. 1990/2631)
- Export of Goods (Control) (Amendment No. 6) Order 1990 (S.I. 1990/2632)
- Plant Breeders' Rights (Amendment) (No. 2) Regulations 1990 (S.I. 1990/2633)
- Plant Breeders' Rights (Miscellaneous Ornamental Plants) (Variation) Scheme 1990 (S.I. 1990/2634)
- Environmental Protection Act 1990 (Commencement No. 4) Order 1990 (S.I. 1990/2635)
- Marriage Fees (Scotland) Regulations 1990 (S.I. 1990/2636)
- Registration of Births, Deaths and Marriages (Fees) (Scotland) Order 1990 (S.I. 1990/2637)
- Registration of Births, Deaths, Marriages and Divorces (Fees) (Scotland) Regulations 1990 (S.I. 1990/2638)
- Health Education Board for Scotland Order 1990 (S.I. 1990/2639)
- Goods Vehicles (Operators' Licences, Qualifications and Fees) (Amendment) (No. 2) Regulations 1990 (S.I. 1990/2640)
- Public Service Vehicle Operators (Qualifications) (Amendment) Regulations 1990 (S.I. 1990/2641)
- Social Security (Widow's Benefit and Retirement Pensions) Amendment Regulations 1990 (S.I. 1990/2642)
- Combined Probation Areas (Somerset) Order 1990 (S.I. 1990/2643)
- Customs Duties (ECSC) (Quota and other Reliefs) Order 1990 (S.I. 1990/2645)
- Welsh Health Common Services Authority Constitution Order 1990 (S.I. 1990/2647)
- Welsh Health Common Services Authority Regulations 1990 (S.I. 1990/2648)
- A604 Catthorpe–Harwich Trunk Road (Thrapston to Brampton Section and Slip Roads) Order (No. 2) 1987 Variation Order and New Trunk Roads Order 1990 (S.I. 1990/2649)
- A604 Catthorpe-Harwich Trunk Road (Thrapston to Brampton Section and Slip roads) Order (No. 2) Supplementary Order (No 2) 1990 (S.I. 1990/2650)
- Community Charges and Non-Domestic Rating (Demand Notices) (England) (Amendment) (No. 2) Regulations 1990 (S.I. 1990/2656)
- Community Charges and Non-Domestic Rating (Demand Notices) (City of London) (Amendment) Regulations 1990 (S.I. 1990/2657)
- M6 Motorway: Widening between Junctions 20 and 21A (Thelwall Viaduct) and Connecting Roads Scheme 1990 (S.I. 1990/2659)
- Customs and Excise (Community Transit) (No.2) Regulations 1987 (Amendment) Regulations 1990 (S.I. 1990/2660)
- Public Telecommunication System Designation (Heartland Cablevision II (UK) Limited) (Nuneaton and Bedworth District and Part of North Warwickshire Borough) Order 1990 (S.I. 1990/2661)
- London—Great Yarmouth Trunk Road (A12) (Kessingland Bypass, Suffolk) Order 1990 (S.I. 1990/2662)

== See also ==
- List of statutory instruments of the United Kingdom
