= Parsa =

Parsa may refer to:

== Places ==
=== Nepal ===
- Parsa, Rupandehi, a village development committee in Rupandehi District, Lumbini Zone, Nepal
- Parsa, Sarlahi, a rural municipality in Sarlahi District, Nepal
- Parsa District, a district in Narayani Zone, Nepal
- Parsa National Park, south-central Nepal
- Parsa Bazar, a town east of Bharatpur, in Chitwan District, Nepal

=== Other places ===
- Persis, an exonym for the region in southwest Iran with the endonym "Parsa"
- Parsa (Vidhan Sabha constituency), an assembly constituency in Bihar, India
- Parsa, Ghazipur, a village in Ghazipur District, Uttar Pradesh, India
- Pārsa or Persepolis, a city built by Darius the Great, serving as capital of the Achaemenid Empire in Persia (Iran)
- Parsa, Mazandaran, a village in Mazandaran Province, Iran
- Parsa, Godda, a village in Jharkhand, India

== People ==
=== Given name ===
- Parsa Pirouzfar (born 1972), Iranian actor, theatre director, acting instructor, playwright, translator.

=== Surname ===
- Ahmad Parsa (1907–1997), Iranian botanist
- Ali Parsa (born 1965), British-Iranian healthcare entrepreneur and former investment banker
- Asghar Parsa (1919–2007), member of Iran's National Front
- Davood Parsa-Pajouh, Iranian scholar at the University of Tehran
- FakhrAfagh Parsa (1898–?), Iranian journalist during the Iranian Constitutional Revolution and a member of the Women's Movement in Iran
- Farrokhroo Parsa (1922–1980), Iranian physician, educator, parliamentarian and government minister
- Khwaja Abu Nasr Parsa (died 1460), a spiritual leader of the Naqshbandi order of Sufism
- Michael Parsa, Canadian politician who was elected to the Legislative Assembly of Ontario
- Nasrat Parsa (1968–2005), Afghan singer
- Niloofar Parsa, Iranian actress
- Reza Parsa, Swedish film director

== Other uses ==
- Parsa (TV series), a Pakistani drama TV series
- PARSA, an early name of Turismo Aéreo, today known as Air Panama
- Pars (disambiguation)
- Parsi (disambiguation)
- Fars (disambiguation)
- Persia (disambiguation)

== See also ==
- Parashah, section of the Hebrew Bible
