= List of Persia-related topics =

== Culture and history of Iran ==
=== Culture ===
- Cultural Heritage Organization of Iran
- Hamamni Persian Baths
- Golha Radio Program
- Khatam, a Persian style of marquetry
- Persian architecture
- Persian art
- Persian calendar
- Persian carpet
- Persian column
- Persian cuisine
- Persian dance
- Persian embroidery
- Persian handicrafts
- Persian Jewels
- Persian garden
- Persian literature
- Persian New Year
- Persian miniature
- Persian motifs
- Persian mythology
- Persian pickles
- Persian religions
  - Persian deities
  - Magus
- Persian traditional music
- Persian weave
- Persian weblogs
- Persian weights and measures
- Persianate cultures

=== Demographics ===
- Parsee
- Persian Canadians
- Persian Christians
- Persian Jews
- Persian women
- Persians

=== Language ===
- Dari-Persian
- Encyclopaedia of Persian Language and Literature
- The Persian Encyclopedia
- Persian alphabet
- Persian grammar
- Persian language
- Persian language in the Indian subcontinent
- Persian studies
- Persid languages
- Persian names
- Middle Persian
- Old Persian
- Tat Persian
- Turco-Persian
- Academy of Persian Language and Literature

=== History ===
- History of Persia
- Persian Constitutional Revolution
- Persian Corridor
- Persian Cossack Brigade
- Persian Gendarmerie
- Persian Gulf Service Command
- Persian Immortals (ancient military unit)
- Persian Kings
- Persian Expedition (disambiguation)
- South Persia Rifles
- Anglo-Persian Oil Company

=== Regions and political entities ===
- Greater Persia
- Persian Gulf
- Persis (Fars province)
- Persian Empire (550–330 BC)
  - Persepolis
- Safavid Persia (1501–1736)
- Afsharid Persia (1736–1796)

=== Wars ===
- Greco-Persian Wars
- Roman–Persian Wars
- Russo-Persian Wars
  - Russo-Persian War (1651-1653)
  - Russo-Persian War (1722–23)
  - Russo-Persian War (1796)
  - Russo-Persian War (1804–13)
  - Russo-Persian War (1826–28)
- Turko-Persian Wars
- Anglo-Persian War
- Persian Gulf Wars
  - Iran–Iraq War (1980–88), also known as the Persian Gulf War or the First Gulf War
  - Gulf War (1991), also known as the Persian Gulf War, the First Gulf War, Operation Granby, or Operation Desert Storm
  - Iraq War (2003–present), also known as the Second or Third Gulf War; an ongoing conflict

== Named after Persia ==
=== Colours ===
- Persian blue
- Persian green
- Persian red
- Persian rose
- Persian violet
- Persian orange
- Persian indigo
- Persian pink

=== Places ===
- Persia, Iowa, United States
- Persia, New York, United States
- Persian Creek, California, United States
- Persia, California, United States
- Persian Shia Cemetery, Saint Petersburg

=== Specia ===
- Persian barrenwort
- Persian buttercup
- Persian cat
- Persian bells
- Persian blue allium
- Persian berry
- Persian cornflower
- Persian crocodile
- Persian cumin
- Persian cucumber
- Persian cyclamen
- Persian darnel
- Persian epimedium
- Persian fallow deer
- Persian fire
- Persian fritillaria
- Persian fritillary
- Persian Greyhound
- Persian hogweed
- Persian horse conch
- Persian iris
- Persian ivy
- Persian jasmin
- 'Persian Jewels'
- Persian jird
- Persian lamb
- Persian leopard
- Persian lime
- Persian lynx
- Persian melon
- Persian mole
- Persian nepeta
- Persian nitro clover
- Persian onion
- Persian parrotia
- 'Persian Pearl'
- Persian pellitory
- Persian pine
- Persian ratsnake
- Persian rose
- Persian ryegrass
- Persian shield
- Persian silk tree
- Persian speedwell
- Persian stonecress
- Persian tiger
- Persian tobacco
- Persian trident bat
- Persian walnut
- Persian whites
- Persian wildrye
- Persian yellow rose
- Persian zatar
- Persian saffron
- Persian zafron

=== Works ===
- The Persians
- Persian Bayán
- Persian Letters
- Persian March
- "Pink Pearl of Persia", the first episode of animated series Batfink.
- Prince of Persia video game

=== Other ===
- Arsames of Persia
- Persian drill
- Persian Gulf illness
- Persian powder
- Persian Sibyl
- Persian wheel
- Persian waxing
- Persiana Jones

== Lists ==
- List of kings of Persia
- List of English words of Persian origin
- List of Persians
- List of ancient Persians
- List of Persian language authors
- List of Persian language poets
- List of Persian language television channels
- List of Persian War Victoria Cross recipients
- List of Persian painters
- List of French loanwords in Persian

== See also ==
- List of Iran-related topics
- List of extensive Iranian ground operations in the Iran-Iraq war
