= Far =

Far or FAR may refer to:

== Government ==
- Federal Acquisition Regulation, US
- Federal Aviation Regulations, US
- Florida Administrative Register, US

== Military and paramilitary ==
- Rebel Armed Forces (Spanish: Fuerzas Armadas Rebeldes), a defunct guerilla organization in Guatemala
- Cuban Revolutionary Armed Forces (Spanish: Fuerzas Armadas Revolucionarias)
- Royal Moroccan Armed Forces (French: Forces Armées Royales)
- Rwandan Armed Forces (French: Forces Armées Rwandaises)
- Revolutionary Anarchist Front (Spanish: Frente Anarquista Revolucionario)

== Music ==
- Far (band), California, US
- Far (album), by Regina Spektor
- Far, an EP by Tina Dico
- "Far", a song by George Hrab
- "Far", a song by Longpigs
- "Far", a song by Gunna from the album Wunna
- F.A.R. (album), by Japanese singer-songwriter Marie Ueda
- "Far", by C418 from Minecraft - Volume Beta, 2013
- "Far", a song by SZA from SOS (2022)

== Places ==
- Far`, a village in Saudi Arabia
- Far, Iran, a village in Markazi Province
- Far, West Virginia, US
- Far Mountain, a mountain in British Columbia, Canada
- Fargo (Amtrak station), North Dakota, US, station code
- Faroe Islands, IIGA country code
- Hector International Airport, in Fargo, North Dakota, US, IATA code and FAA LID

== Science, technology, and medicine ==
- Far Manager, a file manager for Microsoft Windows
- IPCC First Assessment Report, 1990
- Fuel–air ratio

== Other uses ==
- FAR (Tracteurs FAR), a former French truck manufacturer
- Far: Lone Sails, a 2018 video game
  - Far: Changing Tides, a sequel to Lone Sails
- Far Breton, a custard-based dessert
- FAR Rabat, a Moroccan football club
- Fataleka language, ISO 639-3 code
- Floor area ratio in real estate
- Fund for Armenian Relief
- Funlola Aofiyebi-Raimi, Nigerian actress
- The Ancient Roman name for the wheat emmer
- Financial Accounting and Reporting in the Uniform Certified Public Accountant Examination

== See also ==
- Fars (disambiguation)
