= Pars =

Pars may refer to:

- Fars province of Iran, also known as Pars Province
- Pars (Sasanian province), a province roughly corresponding to the present-day Fars, 224–651
- Pars, for Persia for Southern Iran, in the Persian language
- Pars News Agency, former name of Iranian news agency
- Pars-e Jonubi (disambiguation), villages in Iran
- FNSS Pars, a Turkish wheeled armoured vehicle
- Pars (surname)
- Pars interarticularis, in spinal anatomy
- The Pars, nickname for Dunfermline Athletic Football Club

PARS may refer to:

- Point-a-rally scoring in the game of squash
- Pakistan Amateur Radio Society
- Programmed Airline Reservations System
- Russian Mission Airport. Alaska, US, ICAO location indicator
- Pre-arrival Review System for import into Canada
- PARS 3 LR, a German anti-tank missile

== See also ==
- Parsa (disambiguation)
- Fars (disambiguation)
- Persia (disambiguation)
