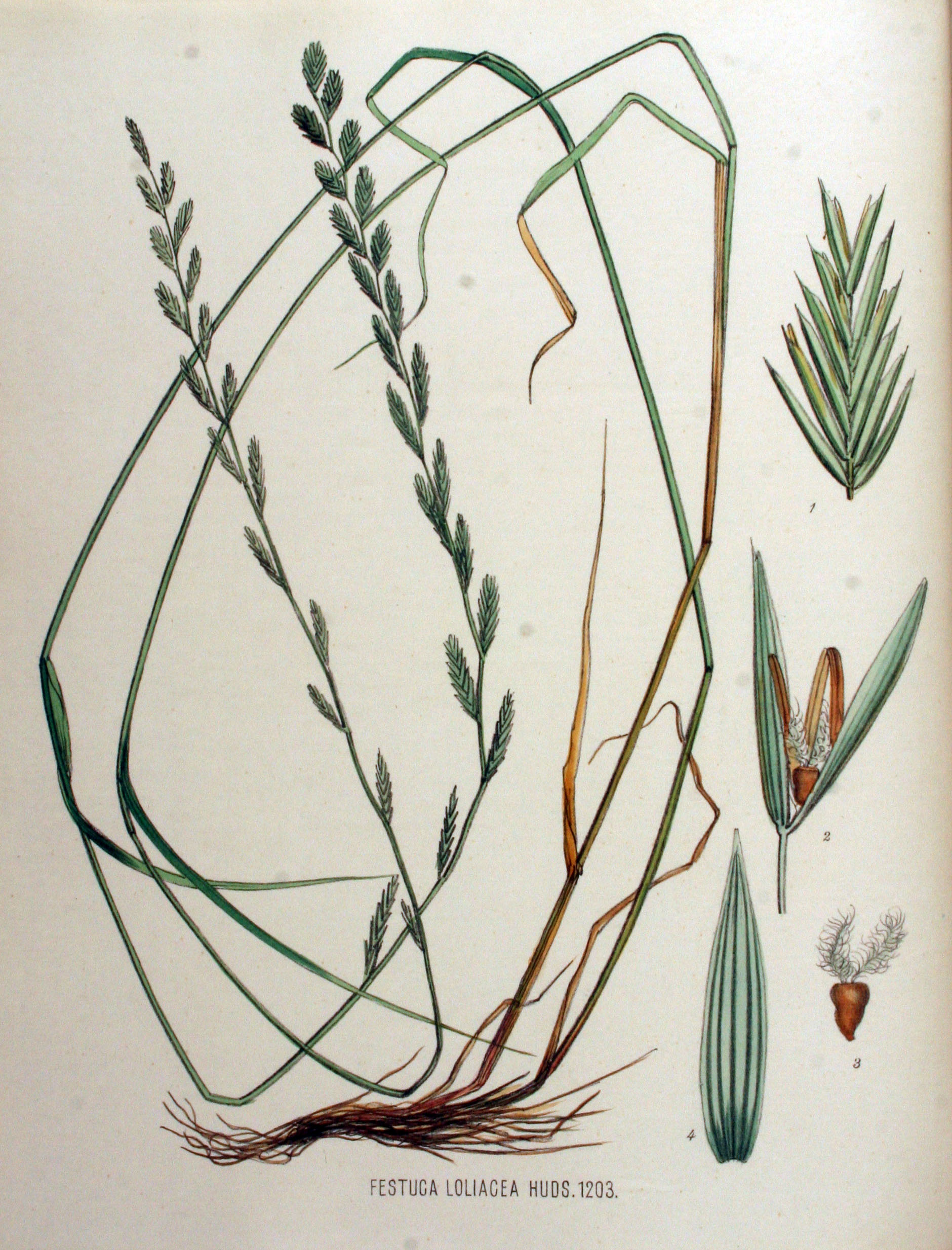

Scientific classification
- Kingdom: Plantae
- Clade: Embryophytes
- Clade: Tracheophytes
- Clade: Angiosperms
- Clade: Monocots
- Clade: Commelinids
- Order: Poales
- Family: Poaceae
- Subfamily: Pooideae
- Supertribe: Poodae
- Tribe: Poeae
- Subtribe: Loliinae
- Genus: × Festulolium; Asch. & Graebn.

Species
- See text

= × Festulolium =

Nothogenus of flowering plants

× Festulolium is a nothogenus of flowering plants in the grass family Poaceae. Naturally occurring hybrids, they are the result of crosses between species of two questionably distinct grass genera, Festuca (the fescues) and Lolium (the ryegrasses), and the hybrids show phenotypic similarities to both parents. This type of intergeneric hybridization is quite rare, and is indicated by a multiplication symbol before the name. The name Festulolium is an example of a portmanteau word, a combination of the two parents' names.

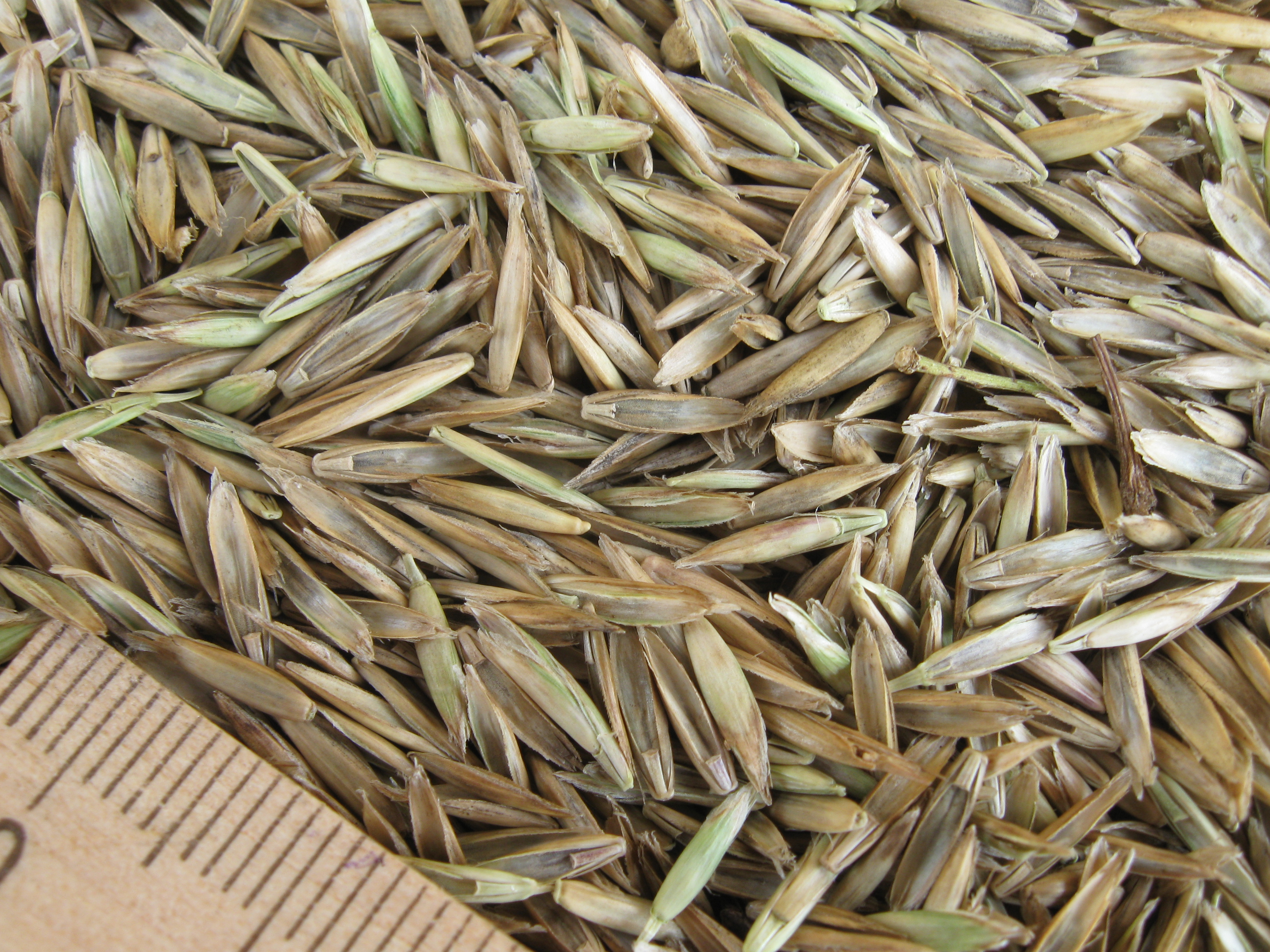
Семена фестулолиума сорт Аллегро

== Species ==
There are three accepted naturally occurring hybrid species found in Europe, where the parental ranges overlap, and a number of artificial crosses used in lawn applications.

- × Festulolium hercynicum (Wein) Banfi, Galasso, Foggi, Kopecký & Ardenghi (Festuca rubra × Lolium pratense)
- × Festulolium pseudofallax (Wein) Banfi, Galasso, Foggi, Kopecký & Ardenghi (Festuca ovina × L. pratense)
- × Festulolium wippraense (Wein) Banfi, Galasso, Foggi, Kopecký & Ardenghi (Festuca heterophylla × L. pratense)
