= Persia (disambiguation) =

Persia, or Fars, is a province in Southern Iran and the native homeland of the Persian people.

Persia or Persias, may also refer to:

== Places in the United States ==
- Persia, Iowa, a city
- Persia, New York, a town
- Persia, Tennessee, an unincorporated community

== People ==
- Persia gens, an ancient Roman family
- Persia Blue, Australian actress
- Persia Campbell (1898–1974), Australian-born American economist
- Persia White (born 1972), Bahamian-born American actress-musician
- Persia Woolley (1935–2017), American author

== Arts and entertainment ==
- Persia (EP), a 1984 EP by The Church
- Persia, the Magic Fairy, a 1984 anime series

== Transport ==
- RMS Persia, a steamship built in 1856
- SS Persia, various steamships by this name
- Peugeot Persia, Iranian sedan motorcar

== Other uses ==
- Persia (name), a Greek and Latin name for Iran
- Persia (trilobite)
- Persia Governorate, a client state of Tang Empire

== See also ==
- List of Persia-related topics
- Takis Persias (born 1957; Greek: Μελέτης "Τάκης" Περσίας, romanized: Meletis Persias), Greek footballer
- Alexander DiPersia (born 1982), American actor
- Persian (disambiguation)
- Persis (disambiguation)
- Persian Empire (disambiguation)
- Parsa (disambiguation)
