= Persian Empire (disambiguation) =

The Persian Empire typically refers to the Achaemenid Empire, which existed between 550 and 330 BC.

The Persian Empire may also refer to:

- Parthian Empire (247 BC–224 AD)
- Sasanian Empire (224–651)
- Main states of the Iranian Intermezzo (821–1055)
- Khwarazmian Empire (1077–1231)
- Ilkhanid Empire (1256–1335)
- Timurid Empire (1370–1507)
- Safavid Empire (1501–1736)
- Afsharid Empire (1736–1796)
- Zand Empire (1751–1794)
- Qajar Empire (1785–1925)
- Pahlavi Empire (1925–1979)

== See also ==
- List of monarchs of Iran
- History of Iran
  - Monarchism in Iran
- List of Persia-related topics
  - Persia (disambiguation)
  - Persian (disambiguation)
