= Perseis =

Perseis may refer to:

- Perseis (Paeonia), an ancient Macedonian city
- Perse (mythology), or Perseis, a figure in Greek mythology
- Perseis, a genus of moths, now known as Parachma
- Perseis, a disused synonym of a genus of sea cucumbers, Bohadschia

== See also ==
- Perseid (disambiguation)
- Perseus (disambiguation)
