= SS Persia =

A number of ships have been named Persia including

- RMS Persia (1856), a British paddle-steamer 1856–1868
- SS Persia (1881), an American-owned, British-flagged ocean liner, built as SS Coptic
- SS Persia (1883), a British cargo liner in service 1883–1909, then as a coaling ship until 1928
- SS Persia (1894), built by Harland and Wolff for Hamburg America Line, in service 1894–1898
- SS Persia (1900), a British ocean liner in service 1900–1915
- SS Persia (1902), an Austro-Hungarian, later Italian, passenger-cargo ship, in service 1902–1926
- Persia, a steam tug built 1902 and sunk in collision off the coast of Essex, England on 11 April 1908

== See also ==
- Persia (disambiguation)
- SS Persier
- SS Persic
