= Festuca elatior =

Festuca elatior L. is the former name of a species of grass, may refer to:

- Festuca elatior sensu lectotype is now a synonym of Festuca arundinacea Schreb.
- Festuca elatior auct. Amer. is now a synonym of Festuca pratensis Huds.
