= Perseid =

Perseid (archaically spelt Perseide) may refer to:

- Any meteor of the Perseids
- Any member of the Perseids (mythology)
- Perse (mythology), a figure in Greek mythology
- Hecate, daughter of Perses (son of Crius)
- The Perseid, a poem by Trinacrius mentioned in Ovid's Epistulae ex Ponto (4, 16, 25)
- The Perseid, an episode of Ovid's Metamorphoses devoted to Perseus

== See also ==
- Perséides (album), 2021 album by Cœur de pirate
- Perséides (film), 2023 film directed by Laurence Lévesque
- Perseis (disambiguation)
- Perseus (disambiguation)
