= Sounds of Rain =

- Genre: Family; Social
- Written by: Alireza Kazemipour; Saeed Jalali
- Directed by: Hossein Soheilizadeh
- Starring: Sam Derakhshani; Hamidreza Pegah; Elham Charkhandeh; Mehran Ahmadi; Niloofar Parsa; Azadeh Zarei; Siavash Kheirabi; Mobina Sadat Atashi
- Country of origin: Iran
- Original language: Persian
- No. of episodes: 40

Production
- Producer: Mohammad Hashemi
- Production locations: Tehran; Karaj; Turkey
- Production company: Tims Productions

Original release
- Network: IRIB TV3
- Release: December 5, 2013 – January 25, 2014

Sounds of Rain (Persian: آوای باران) also known as Ava-ye Baran, is an Iranian TV series directed by Hussein Soheilizadeh that airs on IRIB Channel 3. The series has produced 40 episodes, each 45 minutes long.

The series is about the life of a man named Taha Riahi. He is looking for his missing daughter, whose eating behavior was hoped to have been modified by medicine.

== Plot ==
Taha is a successful businessman and a widower living with his five year old daughter. On a business trip to Turkey, he is framed for smuggling drugs and sentenced to life in prison, so he entrusts everything he has, including his daughter, to his nephew. After 20 years, Taha is released and comes back home, but things are not exactly as he had left them. He soon realizes he may have put his trust in the wrong people.

== Cast ==
- Sam Derakhshani: Nader, Taha's nephew
- Hamidreza Pegah: Taha Riahi, a successful businessman and a widower living with his five year old daughter
- Elham Kharkhandeh as Zivar, Nader's wife
- Azadeh Zarei: Baran Riahi, Taha's daughter
- Mobina Sadat Atashi: Baran as a child
- Siavash Kheirabi: Farid, Nader and Zivar s son
- Niloofar Parsa: Bita, Nader and Zivar's daughter
