= Lolium mazzettianum =

Scientific classification
- Kingdom: Plantae
- Clade: Tracheophytes
- Clade: Angiosperms
- Clade: Monocots
- Clade: Commelinids
- Order: Poales
- Family: Poaceae
- Subfamily: Pooideae
- Genus: Lolium
- Species: L. mazzettianum

Binomial name
- Lolium mazzettianum Darbysh

Synonyms
- Festuca kunmingensis B.S.Sun in Fl. Yunnanica 9: 258 (2003); Festuca mairei Hack. ex Hand.-Mazz. in Symb. Sin. 7: 1288 (1936), nom. illeg.; Festuca mazzettiana E.B.Alexeev in Byull. Moskovsk. Obshch. Isp. Prir., Otd. Biol., n.s., 82(3): 99 (1977); Schedonorus mazzettianus (E.B.Alexeev) Holub in Preslia 70: 113 (1998)

Species of grass

Lolium mazzettianum is a species of grass in the family Poaceae. It is native in south-central of China. It is perennial and mainly grows on temperate biomes. Lolium mazzettianum was first published in 1993 by John M. Darby.
