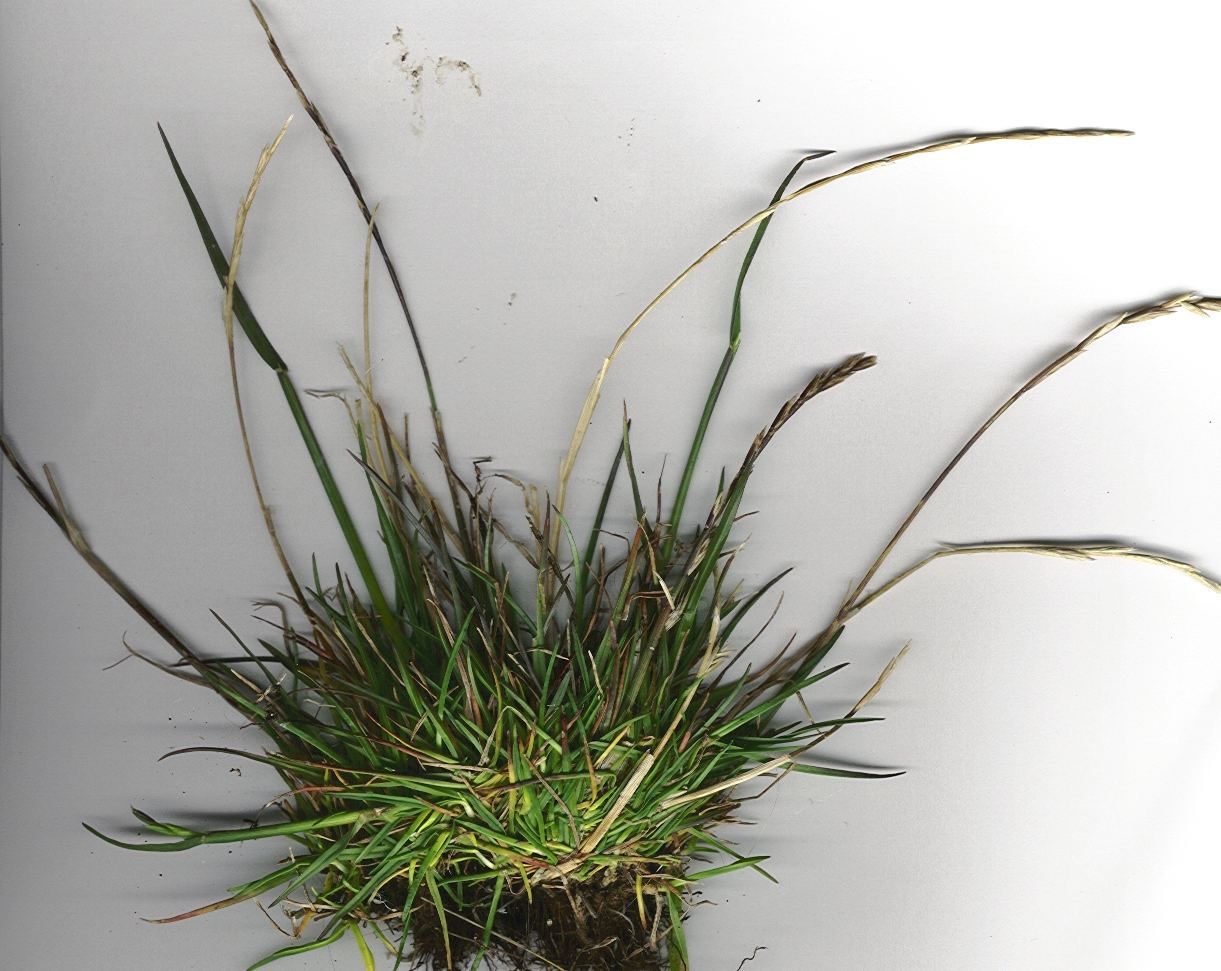
- Perennial ryegrass (Lolium perenne)

Scientific classification
- Kingdom: Plantae
- Clade: Tracheophytes
- Clade: Angiosperms
- Clade: Monocots
- Clade: Commelinids
- Order: Poales
- Family: Poaceae
- Subfamily: Pooideae
- Supertribe: Poodae
- Tribe: Poeae
- Subtribe: Loliinae
- Genus: Lolium; L.

Synonyms
- Arthrochortus Lowe; Bucetum Parn.; Craepalia Schrank; Crypturus Link; Drymonaetes Ehrh.; Gnomonia Lunell; Loliola Dubois; Micropyropsis Romero Zarco & Cabezudo; Schedonorus P.Beauv.

= Lolium =

Genus of plants (tufted grasses)

Lolium is a genus of tufted grasses in the bluegrass subfamily (Pooideae). It is often called ryegrass, but this term is sometimes used to refer to grasses in other genera.

They are characterized by bunch-like growth habits. Lolium is native to Europe, Asia and northern Africa, as well as being cultivated and naturalized in Australia, the Americas, and various oceanic islands. Ryegrasses are naturally diploid, with 2n=14, and are closely related to the fescues (Festuca).

Ryegrass should not be confused with rye, which is a grain crop.

== Species ==
As of February 2024 the species of Lolium listed by Plants of the World Online include:

- Lolium adzharicum (Tzvelev) Banfi, Galasso, Foggi, Kopecký & Ardenghi
- Lolium apenninum (De Not.) Ardenghi & Foggi
- Lolium arundinaceum (Schreb.) Darbysh.
- Lolium × aschersonianum (Dörfl.) Banfi, Galasso, Foggi, Kopecký & Ardenghi
- Lolium atlantigenum (St.-Yves) Banfi, Galasso, Foggi, Kopecký & Ardenghi
- Lolium × boucheanum Kunth
- Lolium × brinkmannii (A.Braun) Banfi, Galasso, Foggi, Kopecký & Ardenghi
- Lolium canariense Steud.
- Lolium chayuense (L.Liu) Banfi, Galasso, Foggi, Kopecký & Ardenghi
- Lolium × czarnohorense (Zapał.) Banfi, Galasso, Foggi, Kopecký & Ardenghi
- Lolium duratum (B.S.Sun & H.Peng) Banfi, Galasso, Foggi, Kopecký & Ardenghi
- Lolium × elongatum (Ehrh.) Banfi, Galasso, Foggi, Kopecký & Ardenghi
- Lolium × fleischeri (Rohlena) Banfi, Galasso, Foggi, Kopecký & Ardenghi
- Lolium font-queri (St.-Yves) Banfi, Galasso, Foggi, Kopecký & Ardenghi
- Lolium formosanum (Honda) Banfi, Galasso, Foggi, Kopecký & Ardenghi
- Lolium giganteum (L.) Darbysh.
- Lolium × holmbergii (Dörfl.) Banfi, Galasso, Foggi, Kopecký & Ardenghi
- Lolium interruptum (Desf.) Banfi, Galasso, Foggi, Kopecký & Ardenghi
- Lolium × krasanii (H.Scholz) Banfi, Galasso, Foggi, Kopecký & Ardenghi
- Lolium letourneuxianum (St.-Yves) Banfi, Galasso, Foggi, Kopecký & Ardenghi
- Lolium liangshanicum (L.Liu) Banfi, Galasso, Foggi, Kopecký & Ardenghi
- Lolium mairei (St.-Yves) Banfi, Galasso, Foggi, Kopecký & Ardenghi
- Lolium mazzettianum (E.B.Alexeev) Darbysh.
- Lolium mediterraneum (Hack.) Banfi, Galasso, Foggi, Kopecký & Ardenghi
- Lolium multiflorum Lam.
- Lolium perenne L.
- Lolium persicum Boiss. & Hohen.
- Lolium pluriflorum (Schult.) Banfi, Galasso, Foggi, Kopecký & Ardenghi
- Lolium × portalii D.Allen
- Lolium pratense (Huds.) Darbysh.
- Lolium remotum Schrank
- Lolium rigidum Gaudin
- Lolium saxatile H.Scholz & S.Scholz
- Lolium scabriflorum (L.Liu) Banfi, Galasso, Foggi, Kopecký & Ardenghi
- Lolium × schlickumii (Grantzow) Banfi, Galasso, Foggi, Kopecký & Ardenghi
- Lolium × subnutans (Holmb.) Banfi, Galasso, Foggi, Kopecký & Ardenghi
- Lolium subulatum Vis.
- Lolium temulentum L.
- Lolium tuberosum (Romero Zarco & Cabezudo) Banfi, Galasso, Foggi, Kopecký & Ardenghi

Formerly included

Several former Lolium species now regarded as part of other genera: Castellia, Enteropogon, × Festulolium, Hainardia, Lepturus, Melica, and Vulpia.

- Lolium bromoides - Vulpia bromoides
- Lolium canadense Michx. ex Roem. & Schult. 1817 not Bernh. ex Rouville 1853 - Melica mutica
- Lolium coelorachis - Lepturus repens
- Lolium cylindricum (Willd.) Asch. & Graebn. 1901. not K.Koch 1848 - Hainardia cylindrica
- Lolium distachyum - Enteropogon monostachyos
- Lolium elegans - Castellia tuberculosa
- Lolium × festucaceum - × Festulolium loliaceum
- Lolium × festucoides - × Festulolium loliaceum
- Lolium × grandispicum - × Festulolium braunii
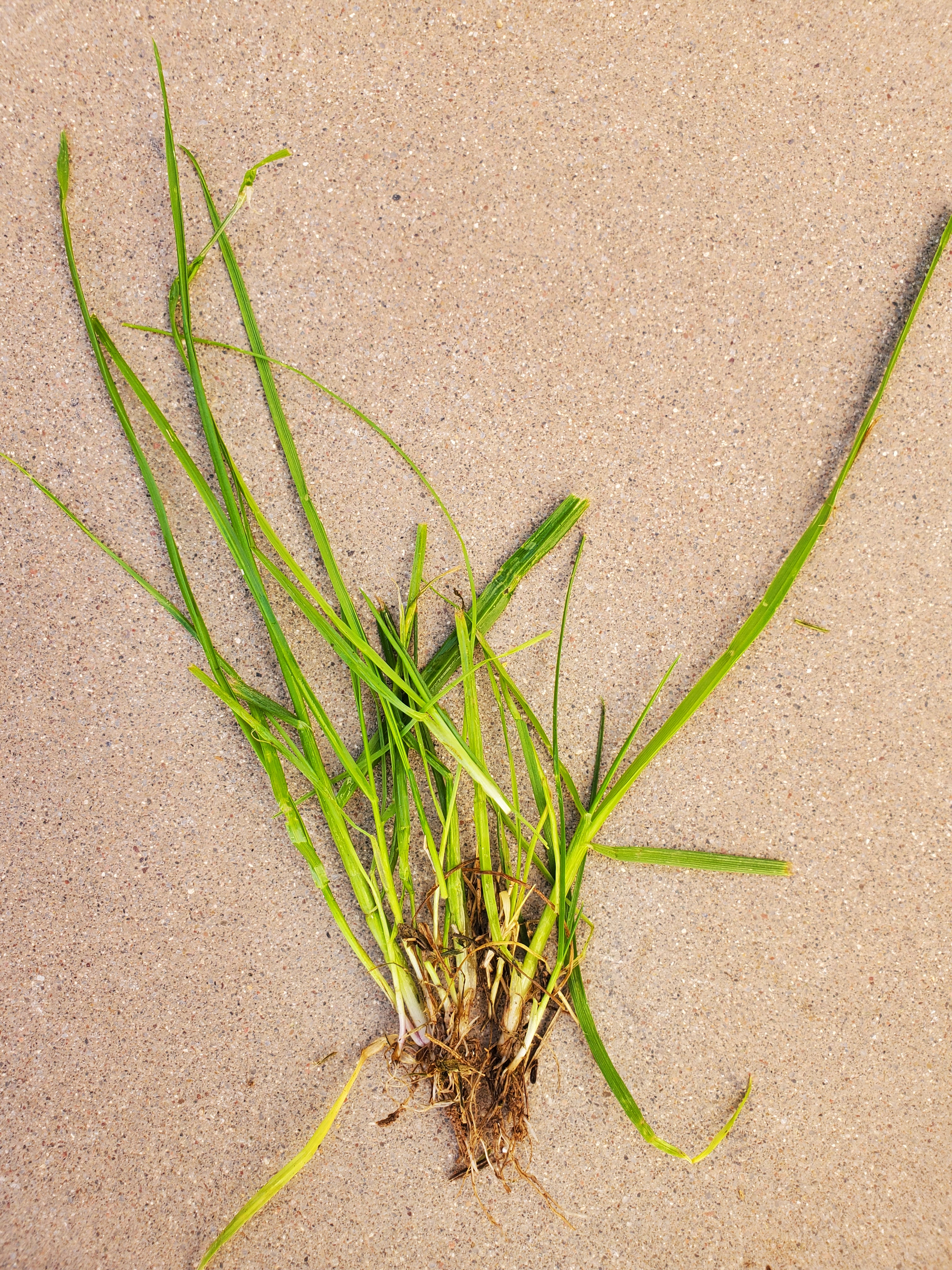
Perennial ryegrass, used as winter lawn.

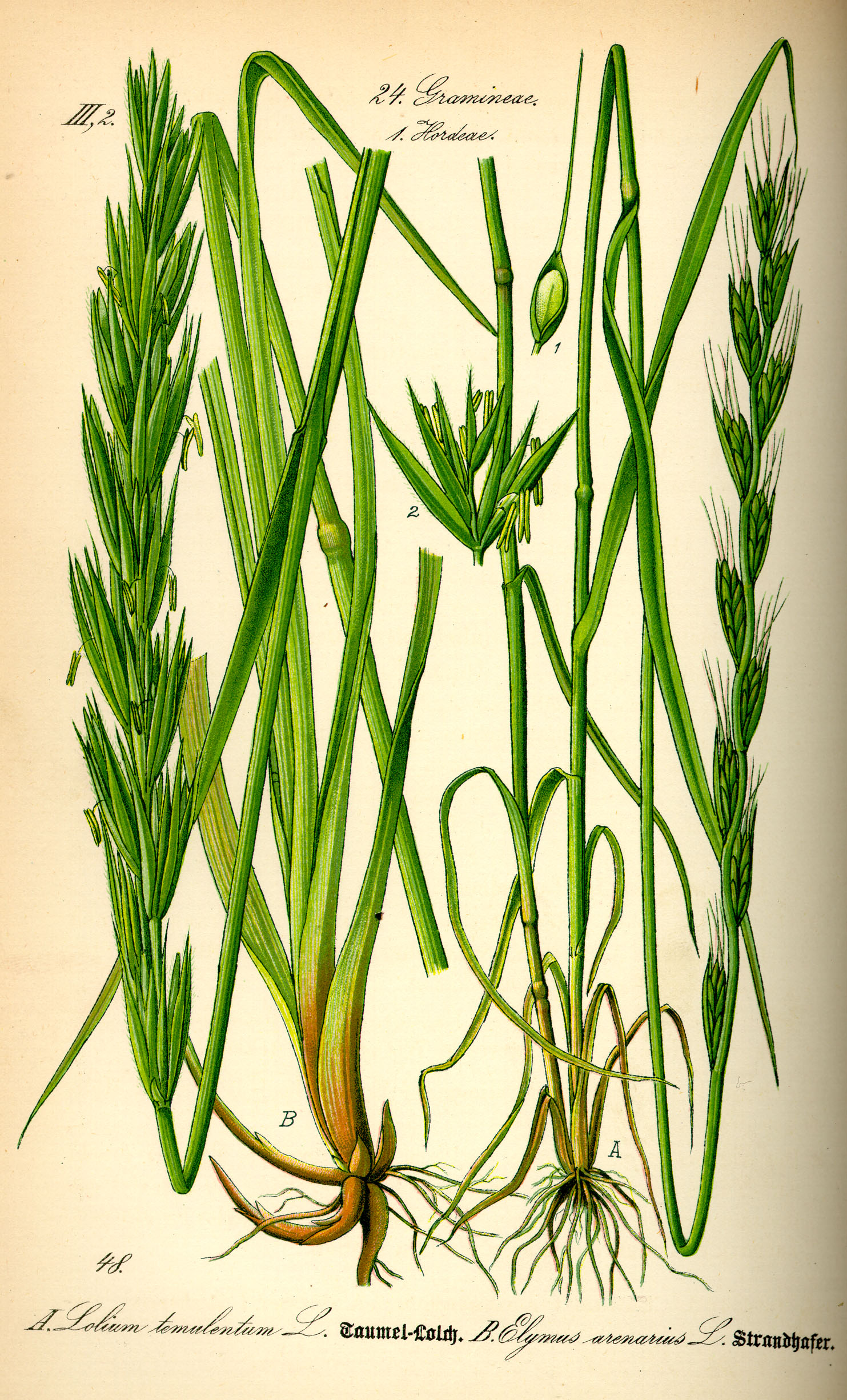
Poison darnel (Lolium temulentum)

== Cultivation and uses ==
Lolium contains some species which are important grasses for lawns, and as pasture and for grazing and hay for livestock, being a highly nutritious stock feed. Ryegrasses are also used in soil erosion control programs. It is the principal grazing grass in New Zealand where some 10 million kilograms of certified seed are produced every year. There is a large range of cultivars. The primary species found worldwide and used both for lawns and as a forage crop is perennial ryegrass (Lolium perenne). Like many cool-season grasses of the Poaceae, it harbors a symbiotic fungal endophyte, either Epichloë or its close relative Neotyphodium, both of which are members of the fungal family Clavicipitaceae.

Some species, particularly L. temulentum, are weeds which can have a severe impact on the production of wheat and other crops. Annual ryegrass (L. rigidum) is one of the most serious and costly weeds of cropping systems in southern Australia, and herbicide resistance is a frequent problem. Ryegrass pollen is also one of the major causes of hay fever. Tennis courts, including those at the All England Lawn Tennis and Croquet Club, the venue for Wimbledon, are planted with ryegrass. Glyphosate-resistant Lolium has been reported from Mississippi in 2006.
