= Perseus and Andromeda (disambiguation) =

Perseus and Andromeda is a story from Greek myth where Andromeda is saved by Perseus. Among many cultural depictions, it may refer to:

- Perseus and Andromeda (Titian), a painting by Titian of 1554-56
- Perseus and Andromeda (Rubens), a 1622 painting by Peter Paul Rubens
- Perseus and Andromeda (Lemoyne), 1723 painting by Francois Lemoyne
- Perseus and Andromeda (Leighton), an 1891 painting by Frederic Leighton, 1st Baron Leighton
- Perseus and Andromeda (video game), a 1983 video game released by Digital Fantasia
- Andromeda (TV series), a TV series from 2000 to 2005

== See also ==
- Perseus (disambiguation)
- Andromeda (disambiguation)
