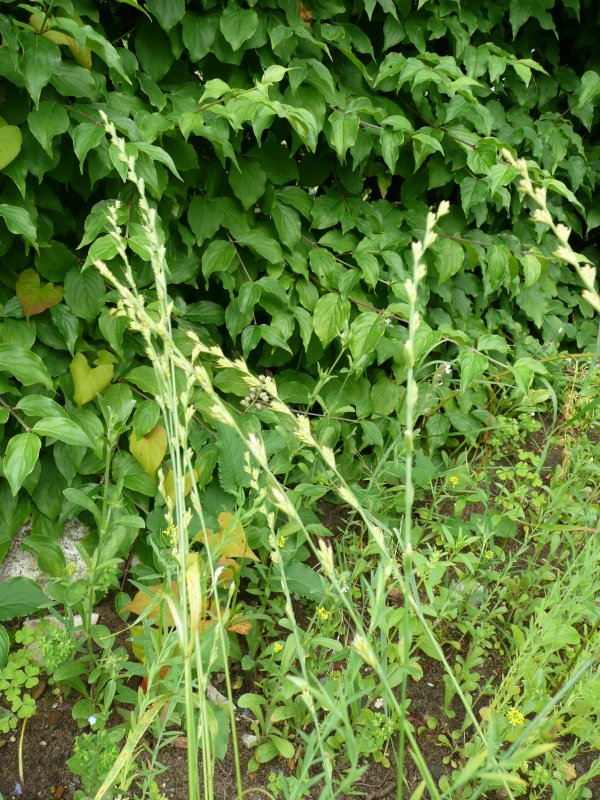

Scientific classification
- Kingdom: Plantae
- Clade: Tracheophytes
- Clade: Angiosperms
- Clade: Monocots
- Clade: Commelinids
- Order: Poales
- Family: Poaceae
- Subfamily: Pooideae
- Genus: Lolium
- Species: L. remotum

Binomial name
- Lolium remotum Schrank

= Lolium remotum =

Species of grass

Lolium remotum is a species of grass in the family Poaceae.

Its native range is Pakistan to Western Himalaya.
