= Perses =

Perses is a name from Ancient Greece. It may refer to:

== Terms ==
- Perses (mythology), several people in Greek mythology
- Perses (brother of Hesiod)
- Perses (band), a T-pop boygroup
- Perses Sumedang, Indonesian football club

== See also ==
- Perse (disambiguation)
- Perseus (disambiguation)
- Persis (disambiguation)
