= Persis (disambiguation) =

Persis or Fars is one of the thirty provinces of Iran.

Persis may also refer to:

- Persis (given name), a feminine given name
- PERSIS (organization), a religious organization in Indonesia
- Persis Solo, an Indonesian football team
- Persis or Perso "the destroyer", a fourth member of the Graeae mentioned by Hyginus

== See also ==
- Persi (disambiguation)
- Persia (disambiguation)
- Perses (disambiguation)
