= Lolium tuberosum =

Scientific classification
- Kingdom: Plantae
- Clade: Tracheophytes
- Clade: Angiosperms
- Clade: Monocots
- Clade: Commelinids
- Order: Poales
- Family: Poaceae
- Subfamily: Pooideae
- Genus: Lolium
- Species: L. tuberosum

Binomial name
- Lolium tuberosum (Romero Zarco & Cabezudo) Banfi, Galasso, Foggi, Kopecký & Ardenghi

Synonyms
- Micropyropsis tuberosa Romero Zarco & Cabezudo

Species of grass

Lolium tuberosum is a species of flowering plant in the family Poaceae, native to Spain and Morocco. It was first described in 1983 as Micropyropsis tuberosa. When placed in the genus Micropyropsis, it was the only species. Under its synonym, the species is listed as endangered.
