= Farrokhroo Parsa =

Iranian physician, educator and parliamentarian (1922–1980)

Farrohkroo Parsa
- فرخ‌رو پارسا
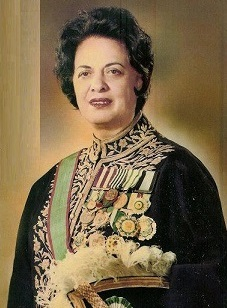
- Parsa in 1968

Minister of Education
- In office 27 August 1968 – 2 January 1971
- Monarch: Mohammad Reza Pahlavi
- Prime Minister: Amir Abbas Hoveida
- Preceded by: Hadi Hedayati
- Succeeded by: Ahmad Houshang Sharifi

Member of the Parliament of Iran
- In office 15 January 1963 – 25 August 1968
- Constituency: Tehran

Personal details
- Born: 24 March 1922 Qom, Qajar Iran
- Died: 8 May 1980 (aged 58) Tehran, Iran
- Cause of death: Execution by firing squad
- Party: Resurgence Party (1975–1978); New Iran Party (1963–1975)

Farrokhroo Parsa (Persian: فرخرو پارسا; 24 March 1922 – 8 May 1980) was an Iranian physician, educator, Member of the Parliament of Iran, and Minister of Education of Iran. She was a supporter of women's rights in Iran, and was executed by firing squad.

She served as minister of education from 1968 to 1971 under Prime Minister Amir Abbas Hoveyda and was the first female cabinet minister ever in Iran. Parsa was an outspoken supporter of women's rights in Iran.

At the outset of the Islamic Cultural Revolution, Parsa was executed by firing squad on 8 May 1980 in Tehran due to her feminist beliefs.

== Early years ==
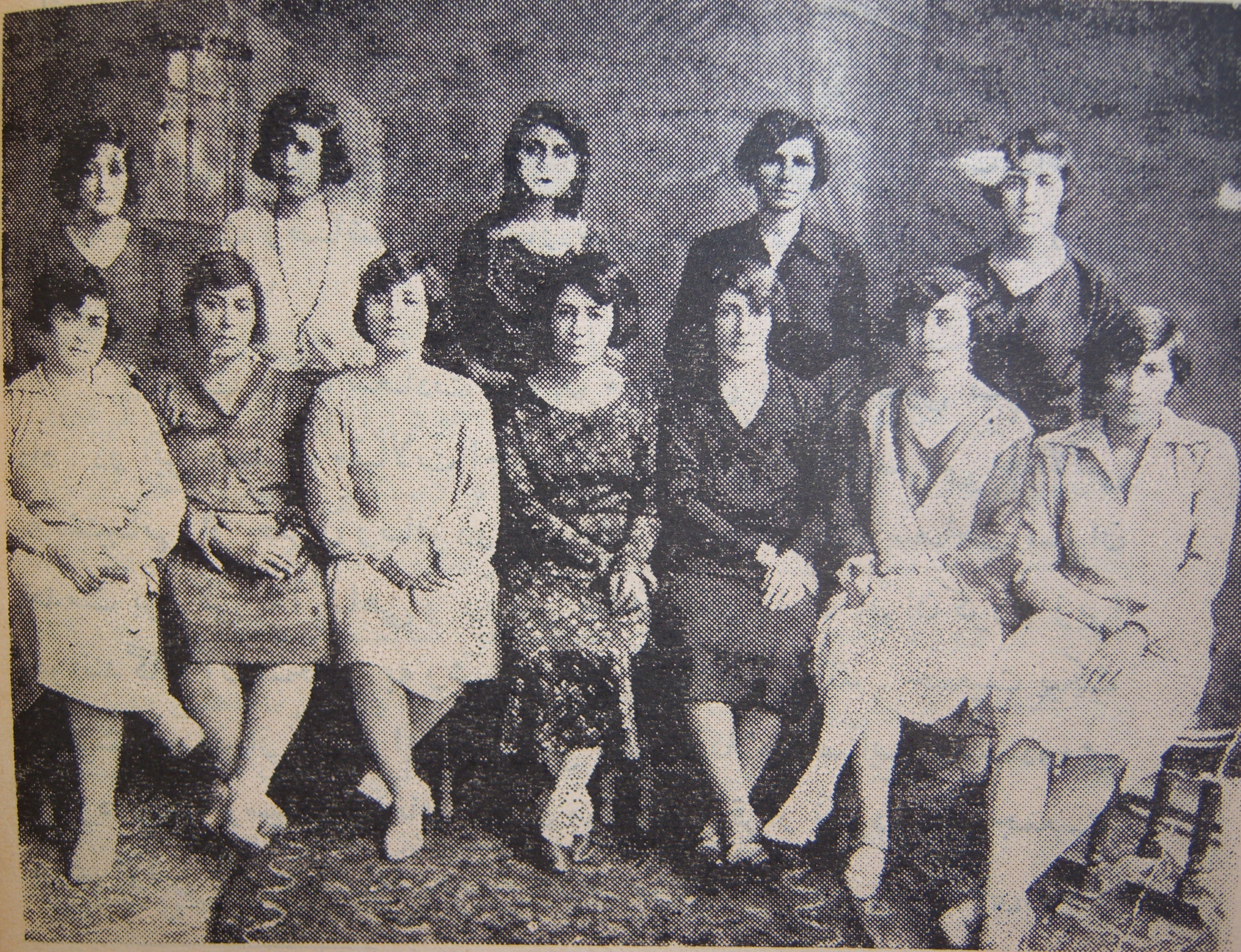
Board of Governors of the Association of Patriotic Women (Jam'iyat-e Nesvan-e Vatankhah), Tehran, 1922–1932. Sitting on the far left is FakhrAfagh Parsa, mother of Farrokhroo Parsa.

Farrokhroo Parsa was born on 24 March 1922 in Qom, Iran, to Farrokh-Din and FakhrAfagh Parsa. Her mother, FakhrAfagh, was the editor of the women's magazine Jahān-e Zan, and a vocal proponent for gender equality and educational opportunities for women. Her views on this subject met with opposition of the conservative sections of the Iranian society at the time, leading to the expulsion of the family by the government of Prime Minister Ahmad Qavām, from Tehran to Qom, where FakhrAfagh was placed under house arrest. It was here that Farrokhroo was born, some minutes past midnight on Iranian New Year's Eve 1922 (Nowruz, 1301 AH). Later, with the intervention of Prime Minister Hasan Mostowfi ol-Mamalek, her family was allowed to return to Tehran.

Upon obtaining a medical degree, Parsa became a biology teacher in Jeanne d'Arc High School in Tehran. At the school one of her students was Farah Diba, who would later become Shahbanu of Iran as the wife of Shah Mohammad Reza Pahlavi.

== Member of Parliament, and Minister of Education ==
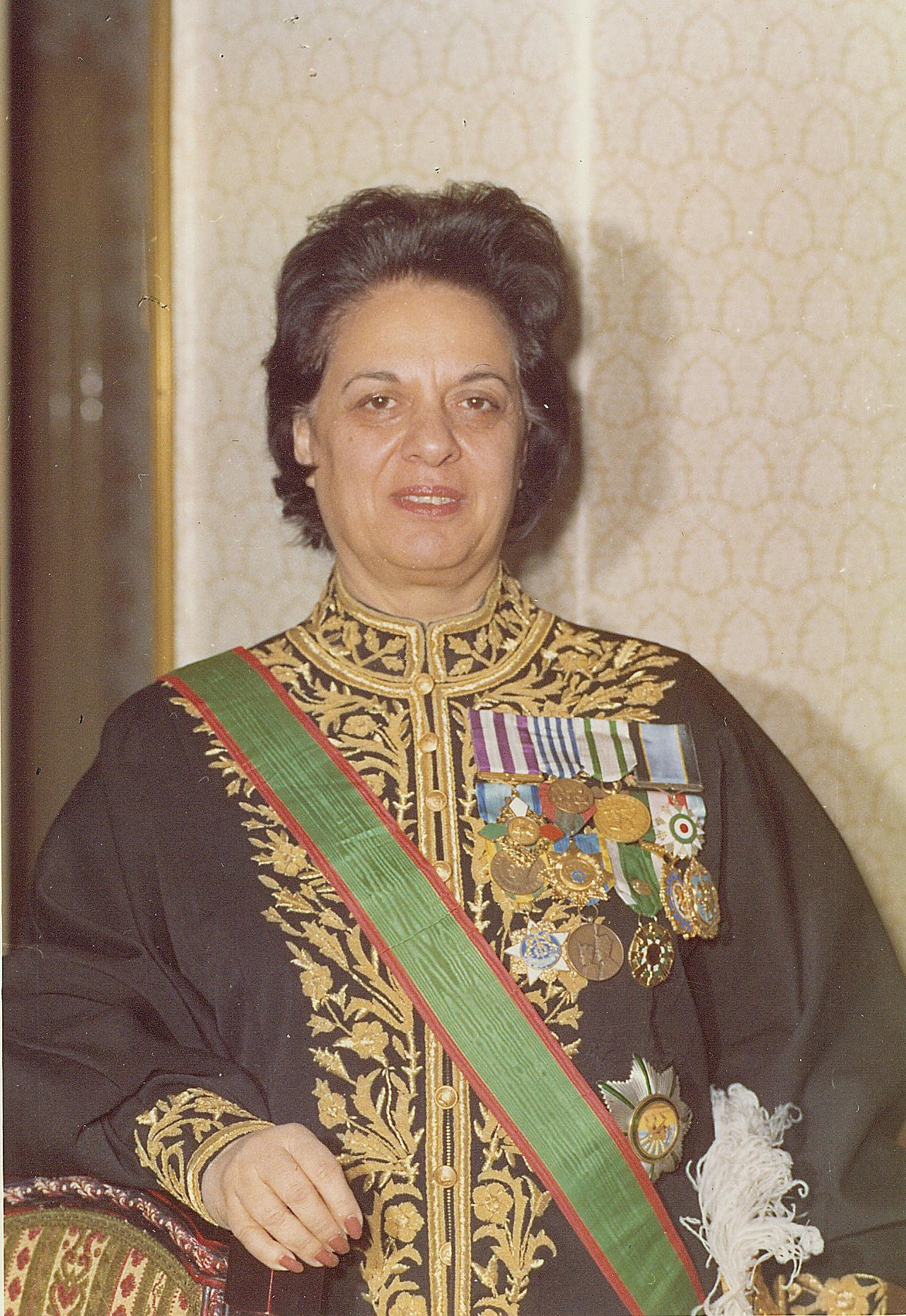
Parsa in 1977

In 1963, Parsa was elected to Iran's parliament (the Majles'; a position she held until 1968), and began petitioning Mohammad Reza Pahlavi for suffrage for women in Iran. She was also a driving force for legislation that amended the existing laws concerning women and family. In 1965 Parsa was appointed Deputy Minister of Education and on 27 August 1968 she became Minister of Education in the cabinet of Amir-Abbas Hoveyda. It was the first time in the history of Iran that a woman occupied a cabinet position.

== Execution ==
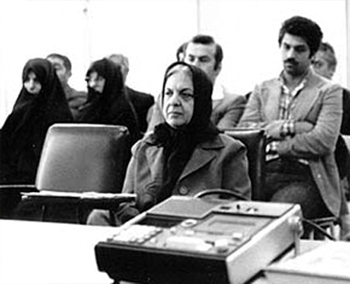
Farrokhroo Parsa, in Islamic Revolutionary Court, 1979

Following the Iranian Revolution, Parsa was arrested and tried by the Islamic Revolutionary Court for allegedly "plundering the national treasury," "causing corruption and spreading prostitution" in the Ministry of Education, "collaborating with SAVAK" and "dismissing combatant educators from the Ministry of Education," and "being involved in passing anti-people laws". She had argued that schoolgirls should not be required to wear the veil and had also supported the use of non-sexist teaching materials in schools. Although Parsa was allowed to make statements in her own defense in the second session of her trial, there was no indication that she was allowed to question those who testified against her, and there is no mention of defense witnesses. Parsa was executed by firing squad on 8 May 1980 in Evin Prison in Tehran.

In her last letter from prison, Farrokhroo Parsa wrote to her children:

"I am a doctor, so I have no fear of death. Death is only a moment and no more. I am prepared to receive death with open arms rather than live in shame by being forced to be veiled. I am not going to bow to those who expect me to express regret for fifty years of my efforts for equality between men and women. I am not prepared to wear the chador and step back in history."

=== Aftermath ===
Her successor as the Education Minister of Iran, Manouchehr Ganji, another minister before the Islamic revolution, expressed surprise at her execution: she was "a lady, ...Doctor, a competent physician who entertained good relations at the Ministry with revolutionaries like Mohammad Beheshti, Mohammad Javad Bahonar, and Rejaii." In fact, during her tenure as minister of education, Beheshti, Bahonar and Mofatteh were on the ministry's payroll. These three were to be major players in the Islamic Revolution several years later. With her ministry's funding, Beheshti established the Islamic Center of Hamburg, and Bahonar was able to set up a few Islamic public schools around Tehran.

== See also ==
- Women's rights movement in Iran
- Women's rights in Iran
- Women in Iran
- List of Iranian women politicians
