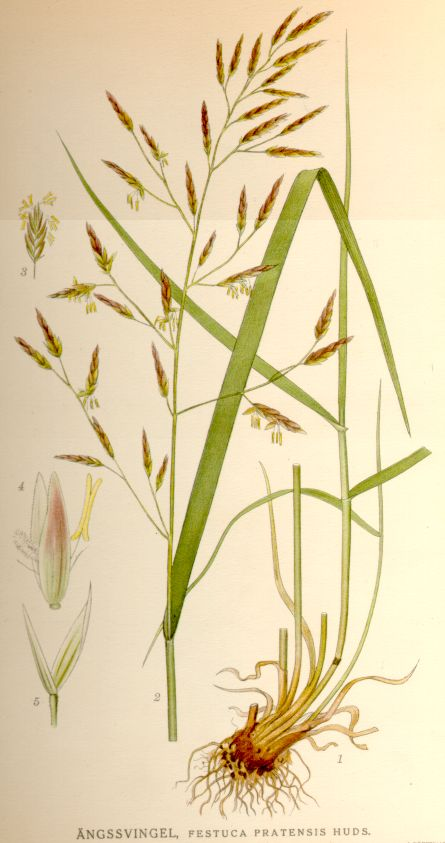

Scientific classification
- Kingdom: Plantae
- Clade: Tracheophytes
- Clade: Angiosperms
- Clade: Monocots
- Clade: Commelinids
- Order: Poales
- Family: Poaceae
- Subfamily: Pooideae
- Genus: Lolium
- Species: L. pratense

Binomial name
- Lolium pratense (Huds.) Darbysh.

Synonyms
- List: Bucetum pratense (Huds.) Parn.; Bromus pratensis (Huds.) Spreng.; Festuca elatior L. subsp. pratensis (Huds.) Hack.; Festuca fluitans L. var. pratensis (Huds.) Huds.; Lolium pratense (Huds.) Darbysh.; Schedonorus pratensis (Huds.) P.Beauv.); Tragus pratensis (Huds.) Panz. ex B.D.Jacks.

= Lolium pratense =

Meadow fescue

Species of grass

Lolium pratense, meadow fescue is a perennial species of grass, which is often used as an ornamental in gardens, and is also an important forage crop. It grows in meadows, roadsides, old pastures, and riversides on moist, rich soils, especially on loamy and heavy soils.

Most publications have used the names Festuca pratensis or, more recently, Schedonorus pratensis for this species, but DNA studies appear to have settled a long debate that it should be included within the genus Lolium instead.

== Description ==
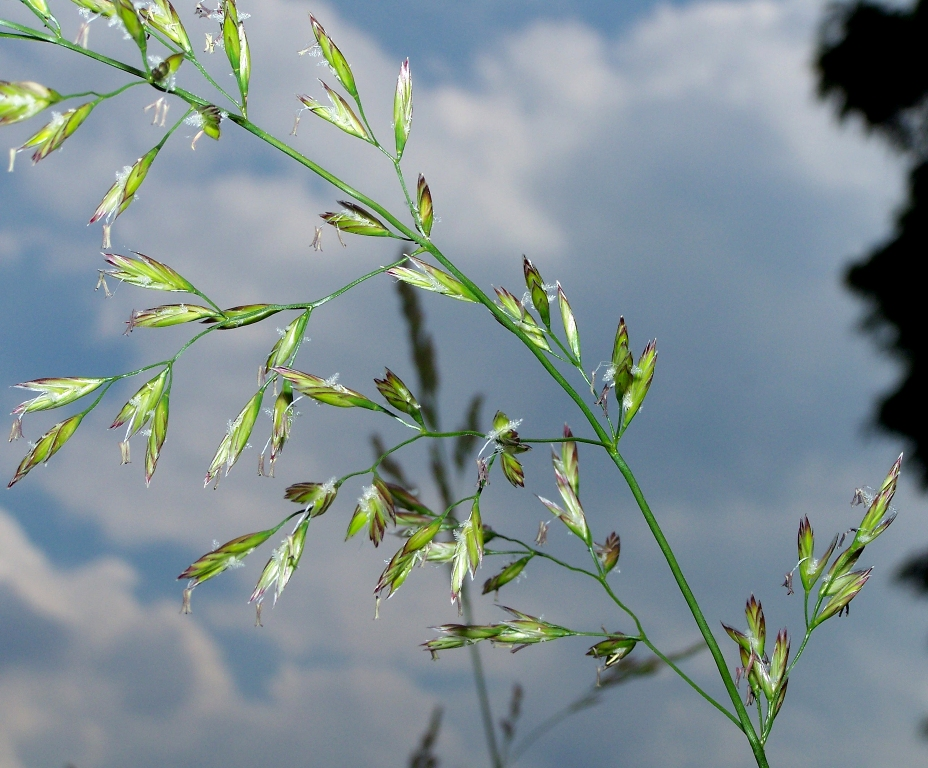
The inflorescence is a panicle.

Meadow fescue is a tuft-forming perennial (called a bunchgrass in the US), with erect to spreading hollow flowering stems up to about 1 m (3 ft) tall (exceptionally up to 120 cm) which are quite hairless (glabrous), including the leaf sheaths. At the top of the sheath is a short (1 mm) ligule and pointed auricles that can wrap slightly around the stem. The leaf blade is flat, up to about 8 mm wide, and also glabrous, but rough on the top and the margins. The tillers (non-flowering stems) are typically shorter but otherwise similar to the culms.

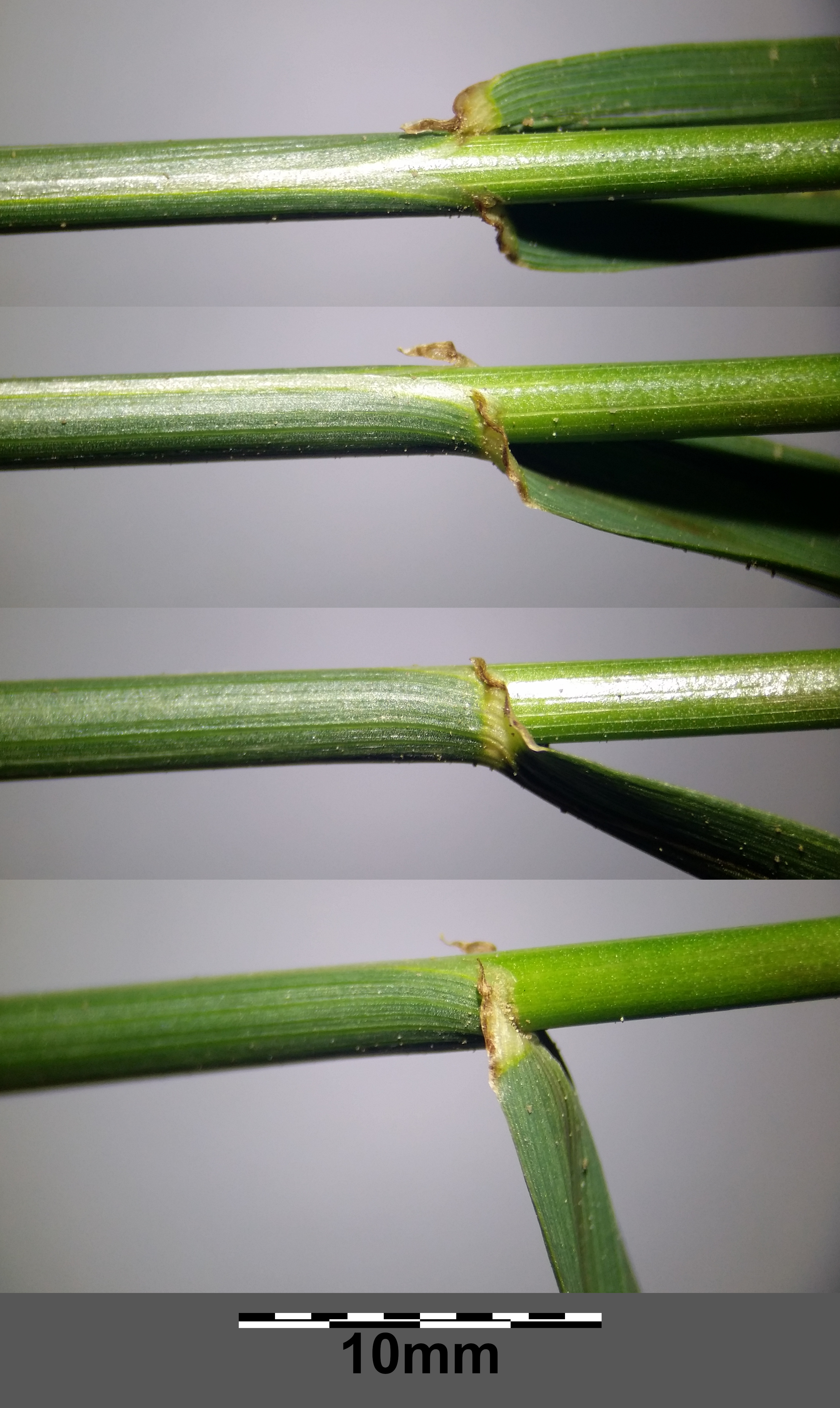
The leaf sheath, blade and auricles are glabrous

Flowering typically occurs from June until August, with an erect to slightly nodding open panicle about 30 cm (1 ft) long, which is more-or-less one-sided. The branches are normally in pairs, the shorter of which bears only 1 or 2 spikelets, whereas the larger one has 4 or more. The spikelets are 11–17 mm long and comprise 5-10 (sometimes up to 16) bisexual florets and two short, unequal glumes. The lower glume has only 1 nerve whereas the upper one has up to 3. The lemmas are awnless or just shortly pointed. Each floret has 3 stamens with anthers about 3 mm long. The fruit is a nut or caryopsis with the seed tightly enclosed by the hardened lemma and palea.

== Identification ==
It is most similar to tall fescue, from which it differs by having only 2 spikelets on the smaller branch at the lowest panicle node and not having minute hairs on the auricles.

== Taxonomy ==
This species was originally included within the genus Festuca, owing to the similarity of the flowers and inflorescences. However, there has been much debate since 1898 about its relationship to the genus Lolium, largely because of hybridization with Lolium perenne (species in separate genera are far less likely to form hybrids than those within the same genus). Recent DNA studies have shown that it should indeed be considered a ryegrass (Lolium) rather than a fescue (Festuca) because these species are more closely related to each other, despite the fact that ryegrasses have inflorescences of spikes rather than racemes.

Its chromosome number is 2n = 14.

It hybridises with Lolium perenne to produce the cross now called Lolium × elongatum (Ehrh.) Banfi, Galasso, Foggi, Kopecký & Ardenghi (formerly xFestulolium loliaceum) and with Lolium multiflorum to produce Lolium × subnutans (Holmb.) Banfi, Galasso, Foggi, Kopecký & Ardenghi (formerly xFestulolium braunii).

== Habitat and ecology ==
Meadow fescue is found in damp grasslands such as water-meadows, pastures and road verges, where it was formerly widely sown as a component of grass-clover seed mixes for improving the productivity of agricultural grasslands. The degree to which it has been planted obscures its natural distribution and has probably extended its range far beyond where it would previously have occurred.

The British National Vegetation Classification lists it as a component of all types of mesotrophic (MG) grasslands but it is not characteristic, or even a constant, in any of them. By contrast, it is not recorded in any calcareous (CG) or acid (U) grasslands. There is some evidence of it occurring in more natural habitats such as M22 blunt-flowered rush and M23 sharp-flowered rush communities by lakes and rivers.

Its Ellenberg values in Britain are L = 7, F = 6, R = 6, N = 6, and S = 1, which show that it favours damp, sunny places with neutral soils and moderate fertility, and that it can occur in slightly brackish situations.
