= Niloofar Parsa =

Iranian actress (born 1990)

- Born: April 16, 1990 (age 36); Tehran, Iran
- Occupation: Actress
- Years active: 2007–present

Niloofar Parsa (Persian: نیلوفر پارسا; born 16 April 1990) is an Iranian actress.

She is the wife of Milad Asadollahi. Niloofar Parsa is a bachelor's degree in IT engineering (information technology) who started in the theater and became famous in the series Sounds of Rain as Bita, and now she also works in music.

== Career ==
Parsa began her career with a few brief episodes in the TV series Would probably happen to you too.

== Filmography ==
=== TV series ===
- 2013 Would probably happen to you too episode There was no heart failure
- 2014 Sounds of Rain
- 2014 Would probably happen to you too episode Among collectors
- 2014 Would probably happen to you too episode Level
- 2014 Last Sultan
- 2017 The best lead in life
- 2017 Borna
- 2022 Unmarked
- 2025 Husband

=== Film ===
- 2014 Impost
- 2015 Shadows of rana
- 2016 Se harfi hasht amoodi
- 2017 Man o sharmin
- 2019 One Night in Tehran
