= Persian powder =

Insecticide powder

Persian powder is an insecticide powder with natural pyrethrin as the active agent. It is also known as Persian pellitory, insect powder and internationally as pyrethrum.

== Biological pest control ==
Persian powder is a green pesticide that has been used for centuries for the biological pest extermination of household insects, garden pests, and agricultural pests. It may first have been exported from Persia to Ancient Rome.

Pyrethrin and pyrethroids are used indoors, in gardens and the horticulture industry, and in agriculture.

It is produced from the powdered flowers of certain species of pyrethrum, plants in the genera Chrysanthemum and Tanacetum. In more recent times it has had formulations with brand names such as Zacherlin.

=== Synthetic forms ===
Pyrethroids are synthetic insecticides based on natural pyrethrum (pyrethrins), such as permethrin.

A common formulation of pyrethrin is in preparations containing the synthetic chemical piperonyl butoxide: this has the effect of enhancing the toxicity to insects and speeding the effects when compared with pyrethrins used alone. These formulations are known as synergized pyrethrins.

== Cultural references ==
In the novel Anna Karenina, the character Kitty used Persian powder to sanitize beds in an unclean hotel.

In Beatrix Potter's The Tale of Mr. Tod , Mr. Tod plans to use Persian powder on his mattress to disinfect it after the badger Tommy Brock sleeps on it, uninvited.

== See also ==
- List of pest-repelling plants
- Organic gardening
- Organic farming
