= Far, West Virginia =

Unincorporated community in West Virginia, US

Coordinates: 39°32′16″N 80°45′15″W

Far is an unincorporated community in Wetzel County, West Virginia, United States.

== History ==
A post office called Far was established in 1901, and remained in operation until 1934. The origin of the name "Far" is obscure.
