= Persian expedition =

Persian expedition or Persian campaign may refer to:

- Persian campaign (Alexander the Great) (334–333 BC)
- Julian's Persian expedition (363)
- Persian expedition of Stepan Razin (1669)
- Persian campaign of Peter the Great (1722–1723)
- Persian expedition of 1796 of Catherine the Great
- Persian campaign (World War I) (1914–1918)

== See also ==
- Anabasis (Xenophon), a written work, titled Persian Expedition in a well-known translation
- Persian War (disambiguation)
