= Farʽ =

Farʽ فرع
- Village
- Location in Saudi Arabia
- Coordinates: 23°49′N 38°52′E
- Country: Saudi Arabia
- Province: Al Madinah Province
- Governorate: Badr
- Time zone: UTC+3 (EAT)
  - Summer (DST): UTC+3 (EAT)

Farʽ (Arabic: فرع) is a village in the Badr Governorate of Al Madinah Province, in western Saudi Arabia.

== See also ==
- List of cities and towns in Saudi Arabia
- Regions of Saudi Arabia
