= Encyclopaedia of Persian Language and Literature =

The Encyclopaedia of Persian Language and Literature (Persian: دانشنامه زبان و ادب فارسی, Dāneshnāme-ye Zabān-o Adab-e Fārsi) is a Persian-language encyclopedia, published in Tehran, Iran.

"Dāneshnāme-ye Zabān-o Adab-e Fārsi" (Encyclopedia of Persian Language and Literature) is a reference collection in Persian published in Tehran and consisting of twelve volumes. This work operates in the subject area of Persian language, literature of the Persian land, and related branches such as grammar, lexicography, literary criticism, and literary history. The publication of this collection was made in response to the need of the Iranian scientific community for a modern and comprehensive reference for literary and linguistic research, and by collecting measured articles on the Persian language, literature, and culture, it makes a commendable contribution to the promotion and advancement of Iranian studies.

The encyclopedia is published in 12 volumes.
