= Pre-arrival Review System =

The Pre-arrival Review System (PARS) is a Canadian Federal Government customs program that allows importers, or customs brokers acting on their behalf, to submit cargo information to the Canada Border Services Agency (CBSA) for review and processing before their goods arrive in Canada.

PARS is intended to reduces border delays for the carrier at when entering Canada. When a PARS shipment arrives at a border port of entry the CBSA has already determined whether it will be immediately released or held for inspection.

For each shipment on their conveyance the carrier must provide to the CBSA officer a cargo control document (CCD) supplied with a unique identifier. This identifier is commonly referred to as the CCN or cargo control number. The CCN is actually an alpha-numeric string consisting of a four character carrier code, as assigned to the specific carrier by the CBSA.

The barcoded CCN is scanned at the point of entry by the CBSA. If that CCN has been approved then its cargo is immediately released for entry into Canada. If the CCN is not approved then the shipment is not released and instead is sent to secondary inspection. Shipments involving a good regulated by other government departments are a common cause of non-approved releases.

If a presented CCN is not found in the CBSA's automated system then the carrier may be subject to an Administrative Monetary Penalty (AMP) for non-compliance.

Pre-arrival Review System

When introduced PARS allowed importers to submit release on minimum documentation (RMD) information to the CBSA for review and processing before their goods arrived in Canada. The documentary requirements for PARS release have steadily increased in detail and since June 1, 2012 the PARS system requires an EDI transmission to the CBSA of a detailed accounting and tariff classification for the entire shipment.

The electronic transmission and exceptions to transmitting electronically when using the PARS release option are the same as for RMD. Goods that require permits, licences or certificates, including those commodities controlled by the Canadian Food Inspection Agency (CFIA), can be processed using PARS.

Cargo and conveyance data may be transmitted up to 90 days in advance. However, a PARS request may not be transmitted more than 30 calendar days prior to arrival. When the shipment arrives, the CBSA will release it within minutes unless an examination or further processing is required to meet another government department's regulation.

As of April 1, 2008, the CBSA no longer accepts paper versions of RMD or PARS requests.

'Release on minimum documentation (RMD)'

RMD allows importers to obtain release of their goods by presenting data for interim accounting. Full accounting data and payment are not required at the time of release but they are required within certain time frames. More information on accounting and payment can be found in Memorandum D17-1-5, Importing Commercial Goods.

The goal of the CBSA is to process complete and accurate release requests that do not require its officers to examine the goods or to review the permits, within the following times:
