= Shades of rose =

Varieties of the color rose

Rose is the color whose name is derived from the flower of the same name.

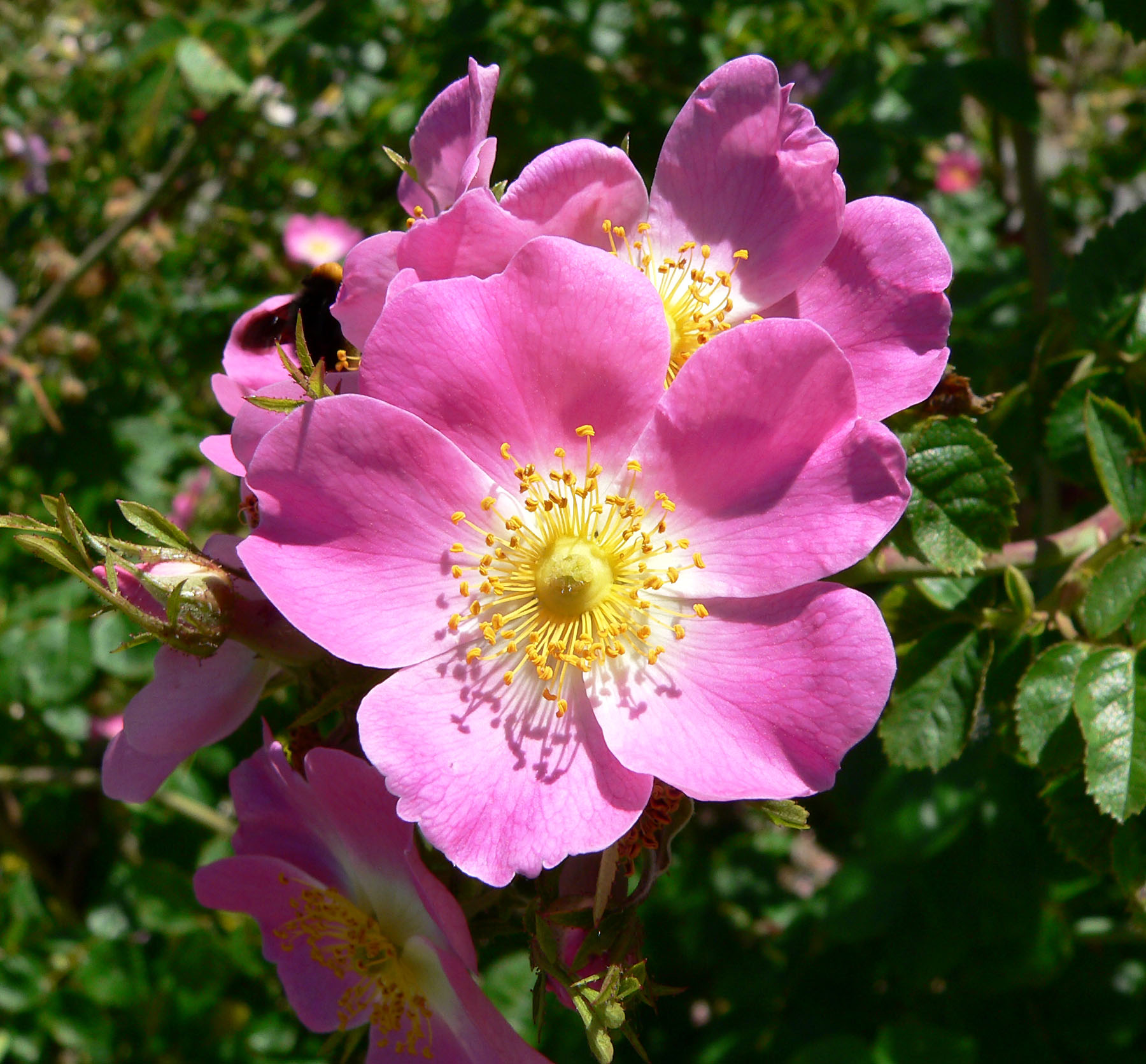
A rose

== Variations of rose ==
=== Brilliant rose ===
Brilliant rose

Color coordinates
- Hex triplet: #F653A6
- sRGB^{B} (r, g, b): (246, 83, 166)
- HSV (h, s, v): (329°, 66%, 96%)
- CIELCh_{uv} (L, C, h): (60, 102, 344°)
- Source: Crayola
- ISCC–NBS descriptor: Vivid purplish red
- B: Normalized to [0–255] (byte)

Brilliant rose
#f653a6

The color brilliant rose is a Crayola color formulated in 1949, but the name was changed in 1958 to magenta.

The original name is more accurate since this color, having a hue code of 329, is much closer to rose than (web color) magenta.

=== China rose ===
China rose

Color coordinates
- Hex triplet: #A8516E
- sRGB^{B} (r, g, b): (168, 81, 110)
- HSV (h, s, v): (340°, 52%, 66%)
- CIELCh_{uv} (L, C, h): (46, 56, 353°)
- Source: ISCC-NBS
- ISCC–NBS descriptor: Moderate purplish red
- B: Normalized to [0–255] (byte)

The color China rose is a deep tone of rose.

The first recorded use of China rose as a color name in English was in 1925.

=== Dogwood rose ===
Dogwood rose

Color coordinates
- Hex triplet: #D71868
- sRGB^{B} (r, g, b): (215, 24, 104)
- HSV (h, s, v): (335°, 89%, 84%)
- CIELCh_{uv} (L, C, h): (47, 118, 357°)
- Source: Colorhexa.com
- ISCC–NBS descriptor: Vivid red
- B: Normalized to [0–255] (byte)

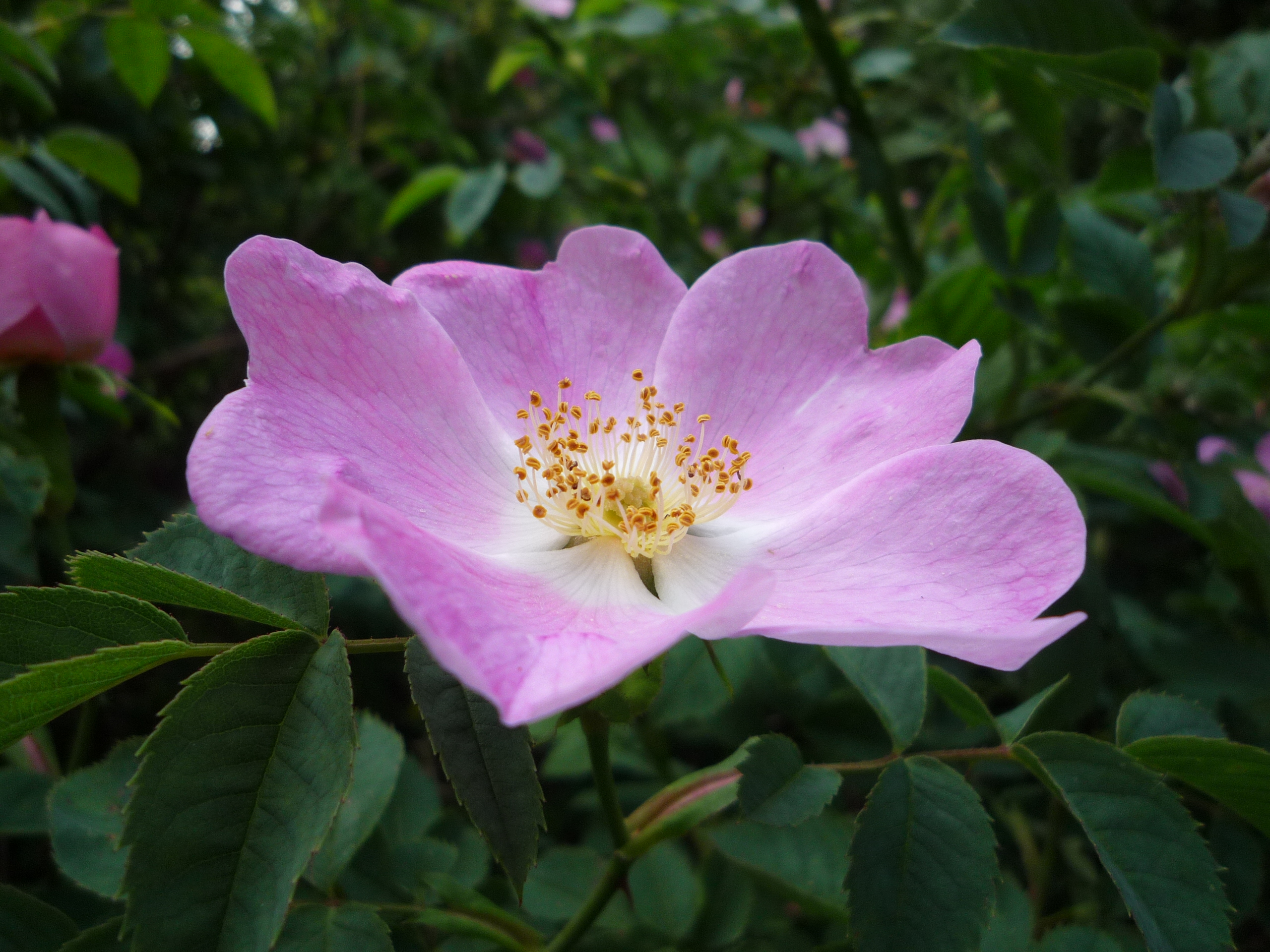
Pink dog rose

The color dogwood rose is sometimes called dogwood red. Dogwood rose in nature:

=== Folly ===
Folly

Color coordinates
- Hex triplet: #FF004F
- sRGB^{B} (r, g, b): (255, 0, 79)
- HSV (h, s, v): (341°, 100%, 100%)
- CIELCh_{uv} (L, C, h): (54, 162, 6°)
- Source: colors.artyclick.com
- ISCC–NBS descriptor: Reddish-Pinkish
- B: Normalized to [0–255] (byte)

This is the color Folly. It is currently unknown when and why the color was named.

=== French (Canada) Rose ===
French (Canada) Rose

Color coordinates
- Hex triplet: #ED438D
- sRGB^{B} (r, g, b): (237, 67, 141)
- HSV (h, s, v): (334°, 72%, 93%)
- CIELCh_{uv} (L, C, h): (56, 109, 351°)
- Source: https://perbang.dk/rgb/ED438D]
- ISCC–NBS descriptor: Brillant raspberry
- B: Normalized to [0–255] (byte)

French (Canada) rose is one of the brilliant raspberry colors.

=== French rose ===
French rose

Color coordinates
- Hex triplet: #F64A8A
- sRGB^{B} (r, g, b): (246, 74, 138)
- HSV (h, s, v): (338°, 70%, 96%)
- CIELCh_{uv} (L, C, h): (58, 113, 355°)
- Source: beaconfabric.com
- ISCC–NBS descriptor: Vivid purplish red
- B: Normalized to [0–255] (byte)

French rose
#f64a8a

The color French rose is also called France rose.

The first recorded use of France rose as a color name in English was in 1926.

Color sample of French rose—this color matches exactly the color sample shown as "France rose" in the 1930 book by Maerz and Paul A Dictionary of Color.

=== Fuchsia rose ===
Fuchsia rose

Color coordinates
- Hex triplet: #C74375
- sRGB^{B} (r, g, b): (199, 67, 117)
- HSV (h, s, v): (337°, 66%, 78%)
- CIELCh_{uv} (L, C, h): (49, 86, 354°)
- Source: Pantone TPX
- ISCC–NBS descriptor: Strong purplish red
- B: Normalized to [0–255] (byte)

Fuchsia rose
#c74375

Fuchsia rose is the color that was chosen as the 2001 Pantone color of the year by Pantone.

The source of this color is the "Pantone Textile Paper eXtended (TPX)" color list, color #17-2031 TPX—Fuchsia rose.

=== Lavender blush ===
Lavender blush

Color coordinates
- Hex triplet: #FFF0F5
- sRGB^{B} (r, g, b): (255, 240, 245)
- HSV (h, s, v): (340°, 6%, 100%)
- CIELCh_{uv} (L, C, h): (96, 9, 347°)
- Source: X11
- ISCC–NBS descriptor: Pinkish white
- B: Normalized to [0–255] (byte)

This is the web color lavender blush. It is a very pale shade of rose.

=== Liseran purple ===
Liseran Purple

Color coordinates
- Hex triplet: #DE6FA1
- sRGB^{B} (r, g, b): (222, 111, 161)
- HSV (h, s, v): (333°, 50%, 87%)
- CIELCh_{uv} (L, C, h): (61, 71, 345°)
- Source: ISCC-NBS
- ISCC–NBS descriptor: Deep purplish pink
- B: Normalized to [0–255] (byte)

The first recorded use of liseran purple as a color name in English was in 1912.

=== Misty rose ===
Misty rose

Color coordinates
- Hex triplet: #FFE4E1
- sRGB^{B} (r, g, b): (255, 228, 225)
- HSV (h, s, v): (6°, 12%, 100%)
- CIELCh_{uv} (L, C, h): (93, 17, 19°)
- Source: X11
- ISCC–NBS descriptor: Pinkish white
- B: Normalized to [0–255] (byte)

Misty rose
#ffe4e1

Misty rose is a pale shade of rose. It is also a web color.

=== Mulberry ===
Mulberry

Color coordinates
- Hex triplet: #C54B8C
- sRGB^{B} (r, g, b): (197, 75, 140)
- HSV (h, s, v): (328°, 62%, 77%)
- CIELCh_{uv} (L, C, h): (50, 77, 341°)
- Source: Crayola
- ISCC–NBS descriptor: Strong purplish red
- B: Normalized to [0–255] (byte)

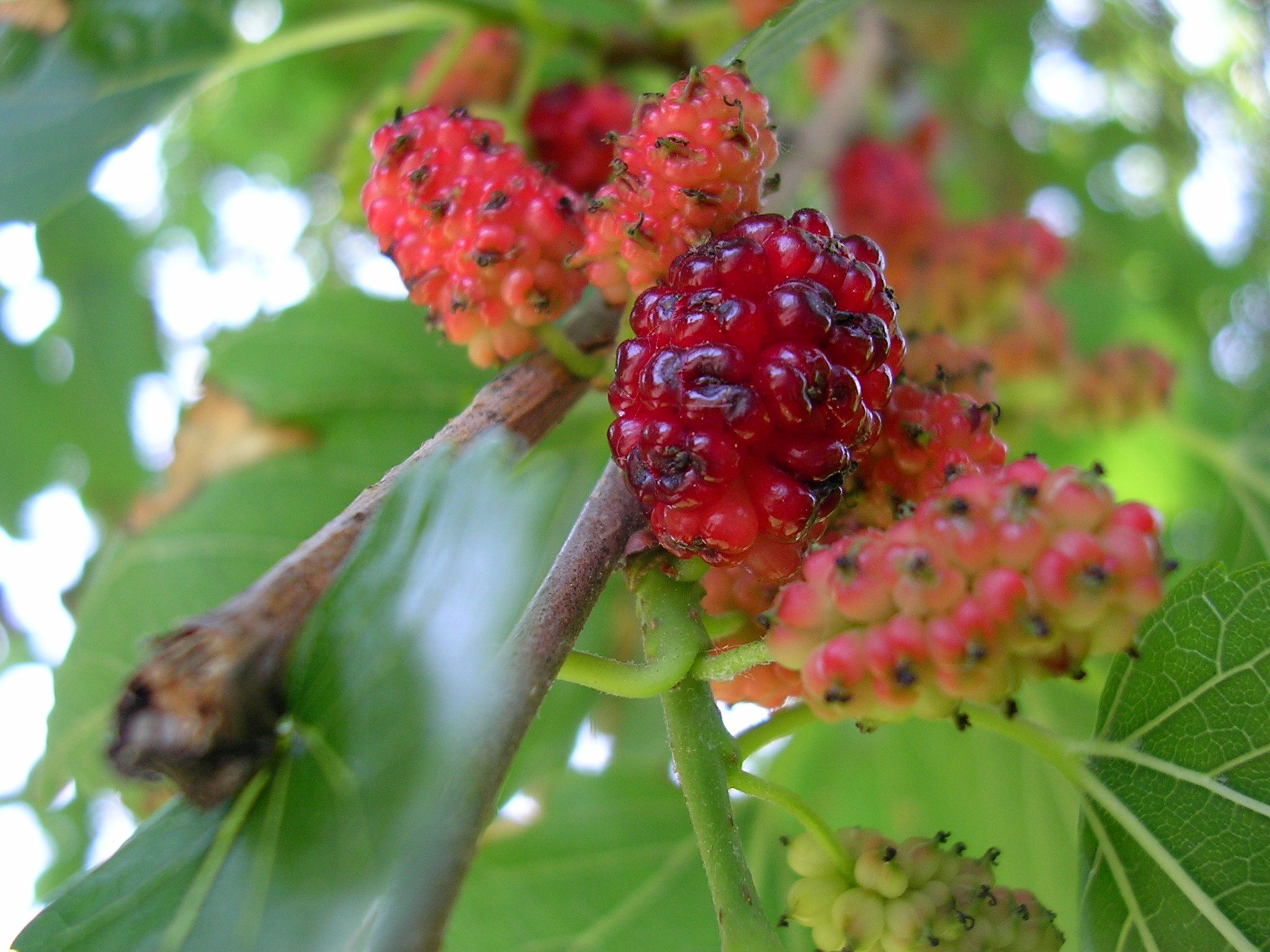
Mulberry fruits

The color mulberry is a representation of the color of mulberry jam or pie. This was a Crayola crayon color from 1958 to 2003.

The first recorded use of mulberry as a color name in English was in 1776.

=== Pearly purple ===
Pearly Purple

Color coordinates
- Hex triplet: #B768A2
- sRGB^{B} (r, g, b): (183, 104, 162)
- HSV (h, s, v): (316°, 43%, 72%)
- CIELCh_{uv} (L, C, h): (55, 54, 323°)
- Source: Crayola
- ISCC–NBS descriptor: Strong reddish purple
- B: Normalized to [0–255] (byte)

Pearly purple is one of the colors in the special set of metallic colored Crayola crayons called Silver Swirls, the colors of which were formulated by Crayola in 1990.

=== Persian pink ===
Persian pink

Color coordinates
- Hex triplet: #F77FBE
- sRGB^{B} (r, g, b): (247, 127, 190)
- HSV (h, s, v): (328°, 49%, 97%)
- CIELCh_{uv} (L, C, h): (69, 76, 339°)
- Source: Maerz and Paul
- ISCC–NBS descriptor: Deep purplish pink
- B: Normalized to [0–255] (byte)

Since the color rose is so well loved in Persia (Iran), some shades of rose are named after Persia, such as the light tone of rose of this color called Persian pink. This color is very popular in women's fashion.

The first recorded use of Persian pink as a color name in English was in 1922.

=== Persian rose ===
Persian rose

Color coordinates
- Hex triplet: #FE28A2
- sRGB^{B} (r, g, b): (254, 40, 162)
- HSV (h, s, v): (326°, 84%, 100%)
- CIELCh_{uv} (L, C, h): (57, 125, 344°)
- Source: Maerz and Paul
- ISCC–NBS descriptor: Vivid purplish red
- B: Normalized to [0–255] (byte)

Persian rose
#fe28a2

The first recorded use of Persian rose as a color name in English was in 1921.

This color matches the color of the Persian rose color sample in A Dictionary of Color—a highly saturated color close to the outer surface of the color sphere, just below the equator of the color sphere, about halfway between rose and magenta. The color Persian rose may also be described as a color close to the purple boundary of the CIE chromaticity diagram about halfway between rose and magenta.

=== Raspberry rose ===
Raspberry rose

Color coordinates
- Hex triplet: #B3446C
- sRGB^{B} (r, g, b): (179, 68, 108)
- HSV (h, s, v): (338°, 62%, 70%)
- CIELCh_{uv} (L, C, h): (45, 72, 354°)
- Source: ISCC-NBS
- ISCC–NBS descriptor: Moderate purplish red
- B: Normalized to [0–255] (byte)

Raspberry rose is a web color.

=== Razzmatazz ===
Razzmatazz

Color coordinates
- Hex triplet: #E3256B
- sRGB^{B} (r, g, b): (227, 37, 107)
- HSV (h, s, v): (338°, 84%, 89%)
- CIELCh_{uv} (L, C, h): (50, 123, 359°)
- Source: Crayola
- ISCC–NBS descriptor: Vivid red
- B: Normalized to [0–255] (byte)

Razzmatazz
#e3256b

The color Razzmatazz is a rich shade of crimson-rose.

Razzmatazz was a new Crayola crayon color chosen in 1993 as a part of the Name The New Colors Contest.

It was named by then 5-year-old Laura Bartolomei-Hill. She was the youngest winner of Crayola's "Name the New Colors Contest."

=== Razzle dazzle rose ===
Razzle dazzle rose

Color coordinates
- Hex triplet: #FF33CC
- sRGB^{B} (r, g, b): (255, 51, 204)
- HSV (h, s, v): (315°, 80%, 100%)
- CIELCh_{uv} (L, C, h): (60, 119, 328°)
- Source: Crayola
- ISCC–NBS descriptor: Vivid reddish purple
- B: Normalized to [0–255] (byte)

Razzle dazzle rose
#ff33cc

The color razzle dazzle rose is a vivid tone of rose tending toward magenta.

The color razzle dazzle rose was named by Crayola in 1990. Before that, from its formulation in 1972 to 1990, it had been named hot magenta.

=== Rose bonbon ===
Rose bonbon

Color coordinates
- Hex triplet: #F9429E
- sRGB^{B} (r, g, b): (249, 66, 158)
- HSV (h, s, v): (330°, 73%, 98%)
- CIELCh_{uv} (L, C, h): (59, 114, 347°)
- Source: Pourpre.com
- ISCC–NBS descriptor: Vivid purplish red
- B: Normalized to [0–255] (byte)

Rose bonbon
#f9429e

The name rose bonbon translates loosely from French into English as candy rose or candy pink, or more specifically as bonbon rose or bonbon pink – presumably referring to bonbons that are coated with icing that is colored rose bonbon.

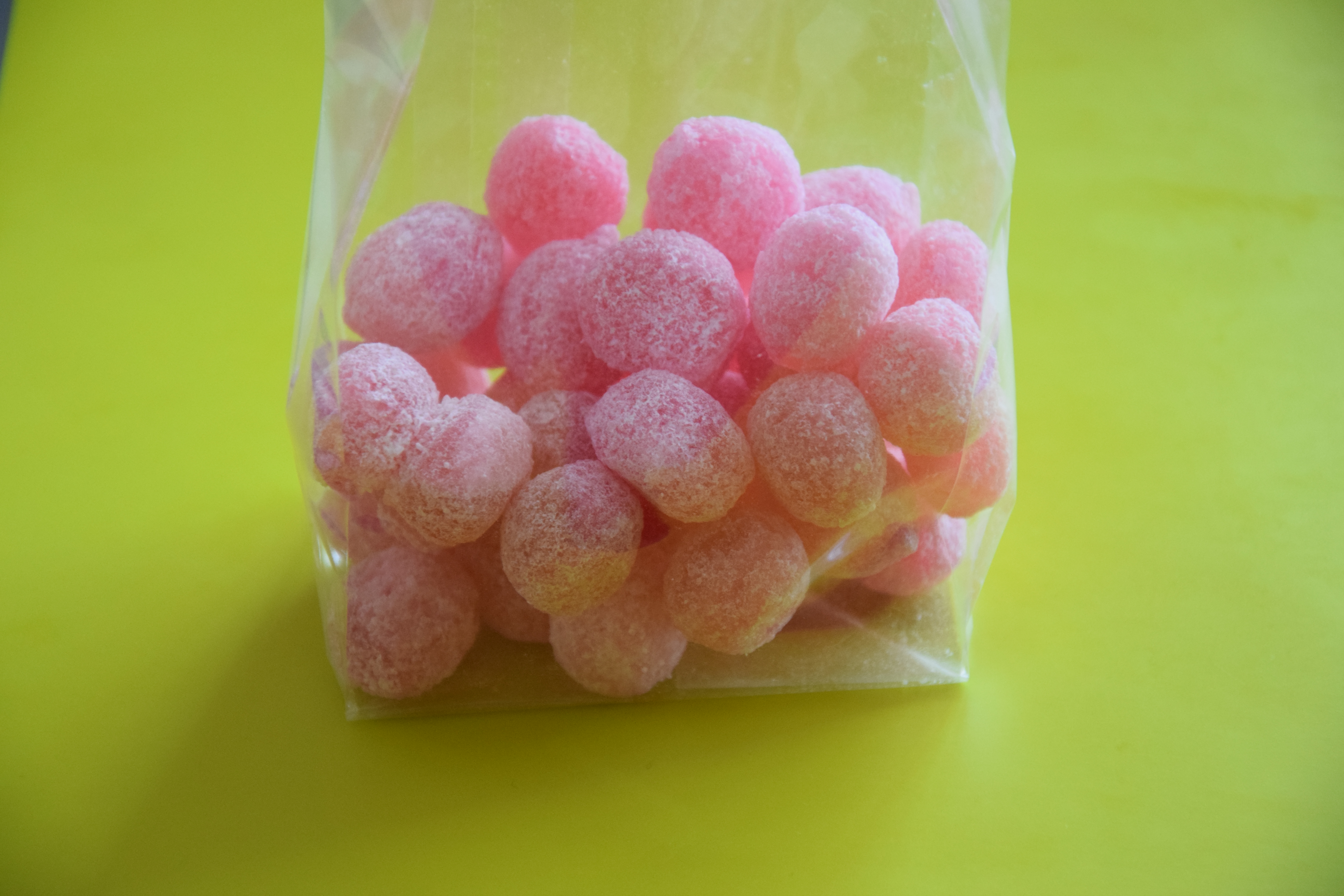
A bag of rose bonbons

Rose bonbon is a tone of rose that is popular in France.

=== Rose gold ===
Rose Gold

Color coordinates
- Hex triplet: #C88CA4
- sRGB^{B} (r, g, b): (200, 140, 164)
- HSV (h, s, v): (336°, 30%, 78%)
- CIELCh_{uv} (L, C, h): (65, 37, 345°)
- Source: Crayola
- B: Normalized to [0–255] (byte)

Rose gold
#c88ca4

Rose gold is one of the eight Metallic FX colors formulated by Crayola in 2019.

Although this is supposed to be a metallic color, there is no mechanism for displaying metallic colors on a computer.

=== Rose pink ===
Rose pink

Color coordinates
- Hex triplet: #FF66CC
- sRGB^{B} (r, g, b): (255, 102, 204)
- HSV (h, s, v): (320°, 60%, 100%)
- CIELCh_{uv} (L, C, h): (66, 97, 331°)
- Source: ColorHexa
- ISCC–NBS descriptor: Vivid reddish purple
- B: Normalized to [0–255] (byte)

The first recorded use of rose pink as a color name in English was in 1760.

=== Rose red ===
Rose red

Color coordinates
- Hex triplet: #C21E56
- sRGB^{B} (r, g, b): (194, 30, 86)
- HSV (h, s, v): (340°, 85%, 76%)
- CIELCh_{uv} (L, C, h): (43, 107, 0°)
- Source: Pantone TPX
- ISCC–NBS descriptor: Vivid red
- B: Normalized to [0–255] (byte)

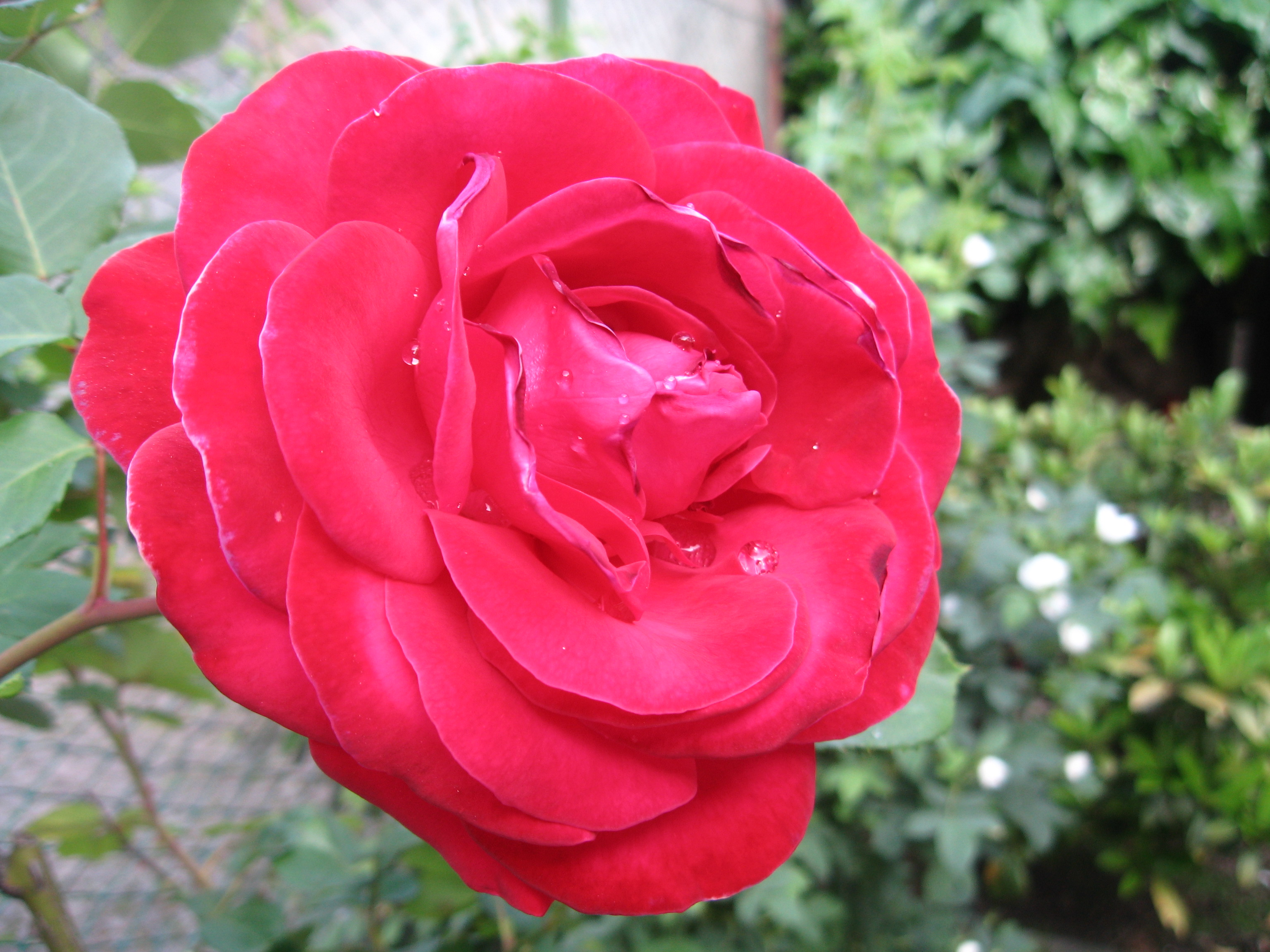
Red rose

The source of rose red is the "Pantone Textile Paper eXtended (TPX)" color list, color #18-1852 TPX—Rose red.

=== Ruby ===
Ruby

Color coordinates
- Hex triplet: #E0115F
- sRGB^{B} (r, g, b): (224, 17, 95)
- HSV (h, s, v): (337°, 92%, 88%)
- CIELCh_{uv} (L, C, h): (48, 130, 1°)
- Source: Maerz and Paul
- ISCC–NBS descriptor: Vivid red
- B: Normalized to [0–255] (byte)

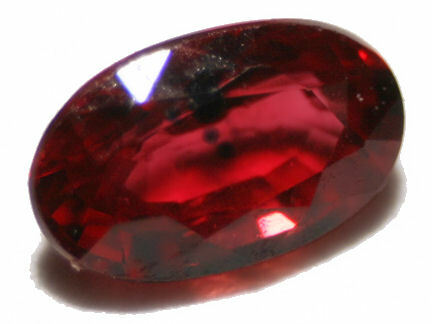
Ruby gemstone

Ruby is a color that is a representation of the color of the cut and polished ruby gemstone. Ruby as a color is more akin to rose than red.

=== Telemagenta ===
Telemagenta

Color coordinates
- Hex triplet: #CF3476
- sRGB^{B} (r, g, b): (207, 52, 118)
- HSV (h, s, v): (334°, 75%, 81%)
- CIELCh_{uv} (L, C, h): (48, 98, 353°)
- Source: RAL
- ISCC–NBS descriptor: Vivid purplish red
- B: Normalized to [0–255] (byte)

The color telemagenta is one of the colors in the RAL color matching system, a color system widely used in Europe. The RAL color list first originated in 1927, and it reached its present form in 1961.

=== Thulian pink ===
Thulian pink

Color coordinates
- Hex triplet: #DE6FA1
- sRGB^{B} (r, g, b): (222, 111, 161)
- HSV (h, s, v): (333°, 50%, 87%)
- CIELCh_{uv} (L, C, h): (61, 71, 345°)
- Source: ISCC-NBS
- ISCC–NBS descriptor: Deep purplish pink
- B: Normalized to [0–255] (byte)

Thulian pink
#de6fa1

The color Thulian pink is also called Thulite pink; the first recorded use of Thulite pink as a color name in English was in 1912.

The term Thulian pink refers to the land of Thule.

Another name for this color is first lady. The first use of first lady as a color name in English was when the Plochere Color System (widely used by interior designers) was inaugurated in 1948.

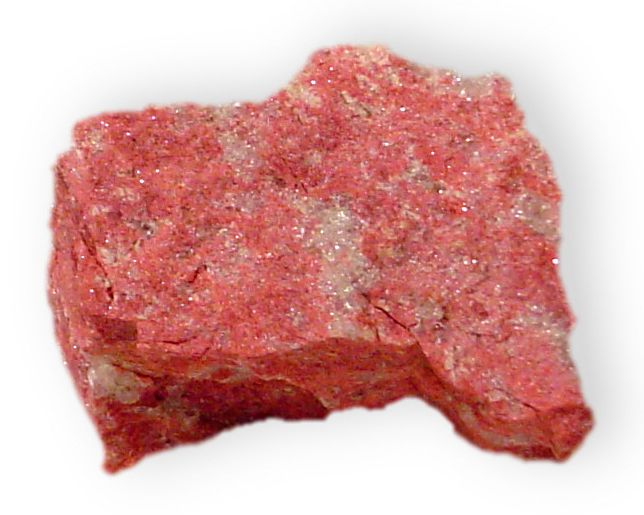
Thulite crystals

The hex code for Thulian pink is identical to that of China pink and Liseran purple.

=== Tickle me pink ===
Tickle me pink

Color coordinates
- Hex triplet: #FC89AC
- sRGB^{B} (r, g, b): (252, 137, 172)
- HSV (h, s, v): (342°, 46%, 99%)
- CIELCh_{uv} (L, C, h): (71, 74, 355°)
- Source: Crayola
- ISCC–NBS descriptor: Strong purplish pink
- B: Normalized to [0–255] (byte)

The color tickle me pink was formulated by Crayola in 1993.

== See also ==
- Amaranth (color)
- Cerise (color)
- Fuchsia (color)
- Toulouse: "La Ville rose"
- List of colors
