= Parsa, Rupandehi =

Coordinates: 27°35′N 84°0′E

Parsa पर्सा Parsa Chowk, Lumbini (Bazaar)
- Village development committee
- Interactive map of Parsa
- Country: Nepal
- Province: Lumbini Province
- District: Rupandehi District
- Time zone: UTC+5:45 (Nepal Time)

Parsa is a village development committee in Rupandehi District in Lumbini Province of southern Nepal. At the time of the 1991 Nepal census it had a population of 3380 people living in 507 individual households.
