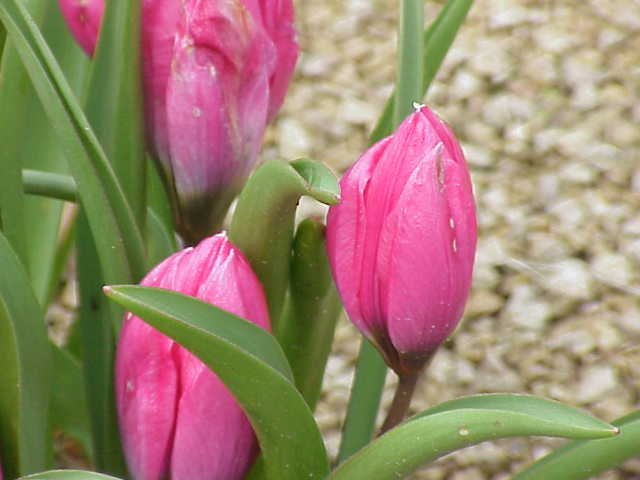

Scientific classification
- Kingdom: Plantae
- Clade: Tracheophytes
- Clade: Angiosperms
- Clade: Monocots
- Order: Liliales
- Family: Liliaceae
- Subfamily: Lilioideae
- Tribe: Lilieae
- Genus: Tulipa
- Species: T. pulchella

Binomial name
- Tulipa pulchella Fenzl et Regel

= Tulipa pulchella =

Species of flowering plant

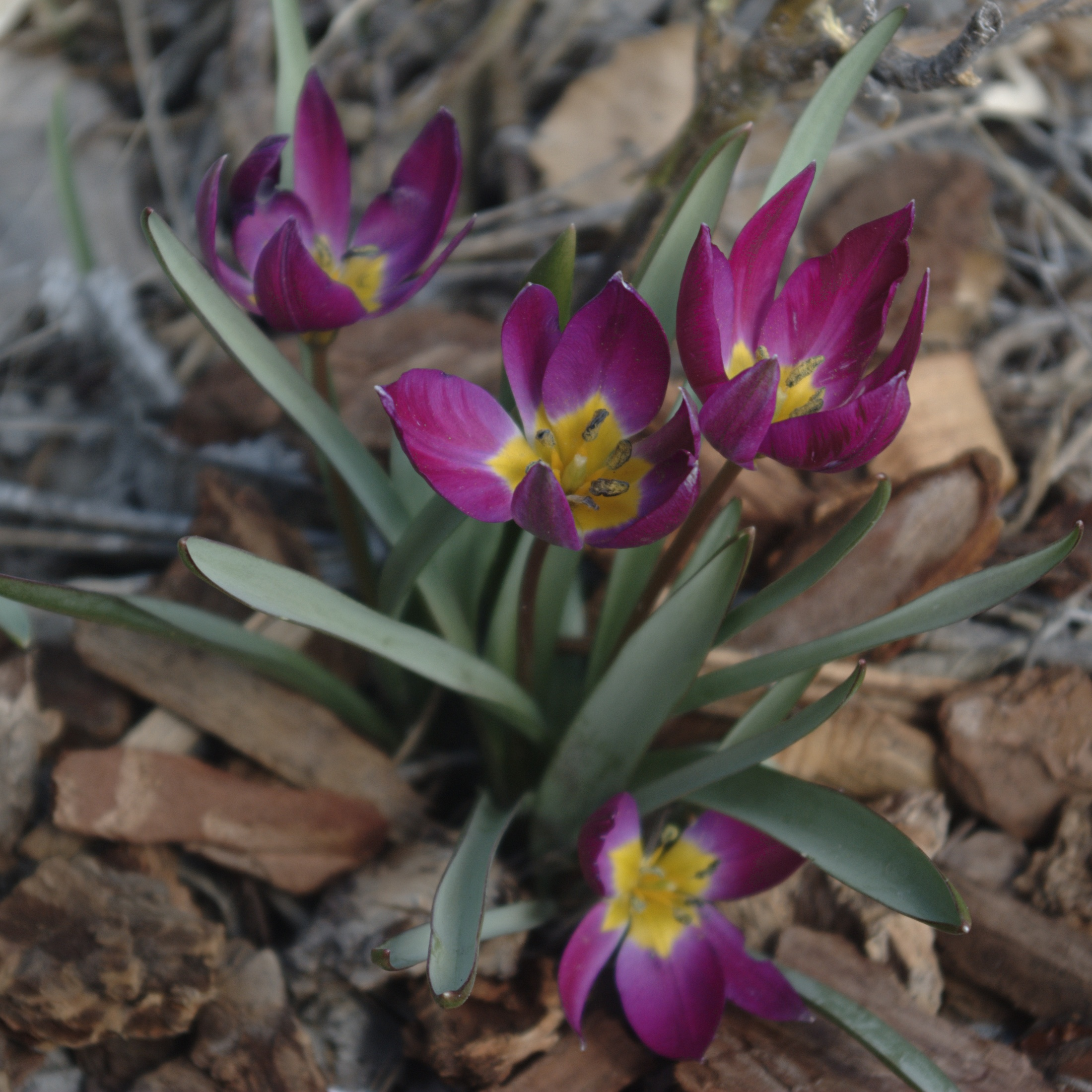
'Persian Pearl'

Tulipa pulchella (syn. Tulipa humilis Herb.) is a dwarf species of flowering plant in the family Liliaceae, native to Iran and Turkey. It grows from a bulb 1–2 cm diameter, which produces a flowering stem up to 20 cm tall. The leaves are glaucous-green, 10–15 cm long. The flowers are reddish-purple, with six tepals 3 cm long and 1.5 cm broad.

== Cultivation ==
In the early 19th century it was introduced to Europe, where a small number of cultivars are grown as ornamental plants in gardens. These include 'Persian Pearl' (purple inside, red outside), 'Eastern Star' (magenta with yellow base), and 'Obalisque' (red inside, purple out). Varieties include var. violacea (purple with black base).
