= Perseus (munition) =

Perseus is a 900 kg (2,000 lb) thermobaric bomb made in Greece.
