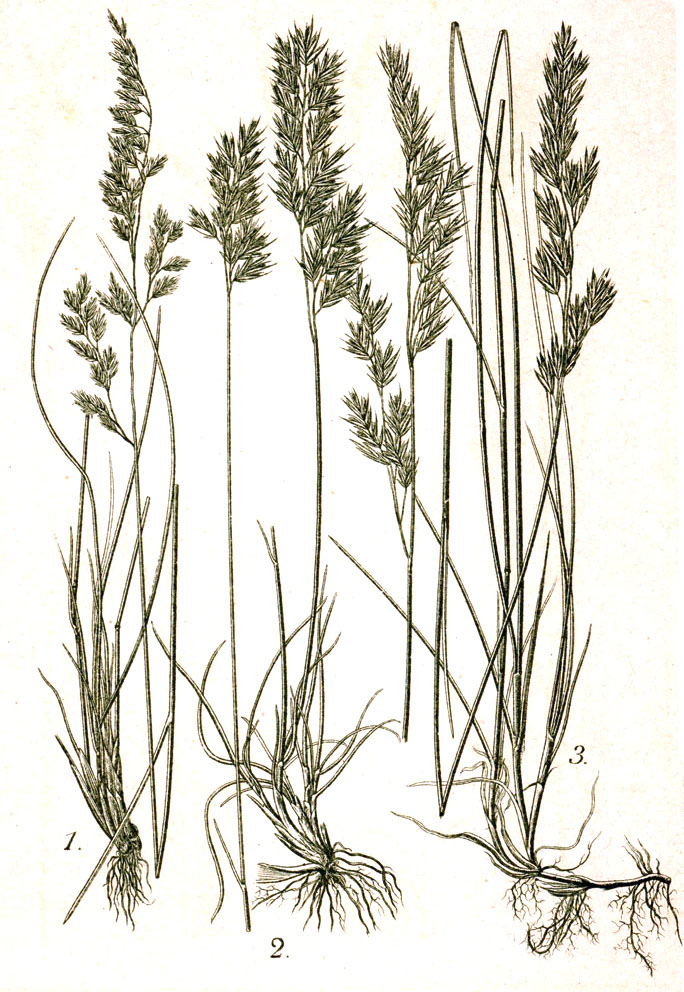

Scientific classification
- Kingdom: Plantae
- Clade: Tracheophytes
- Clade: Angiosperms
- Clade: Monocots
- Clade: Commelinids
- Order: Poales
- Family: Poaceae
- Subfamily: Pooideae
- Genus: Festuca
- Species: F. heterophylla

Binomial name
- Festuca heterophylla Lam.

= Festuca heterophylla =

Species of grass

Festuca heterophylla, the various-leaved fescue, is a species of perennial plant from family Poaceae that is native to southern Europe. It is also grows in Asia and in the US states of New York and Virginia.
