= FakhrAfagh Parsa =

Iranian journalist and women's rights activist (b. 1898)

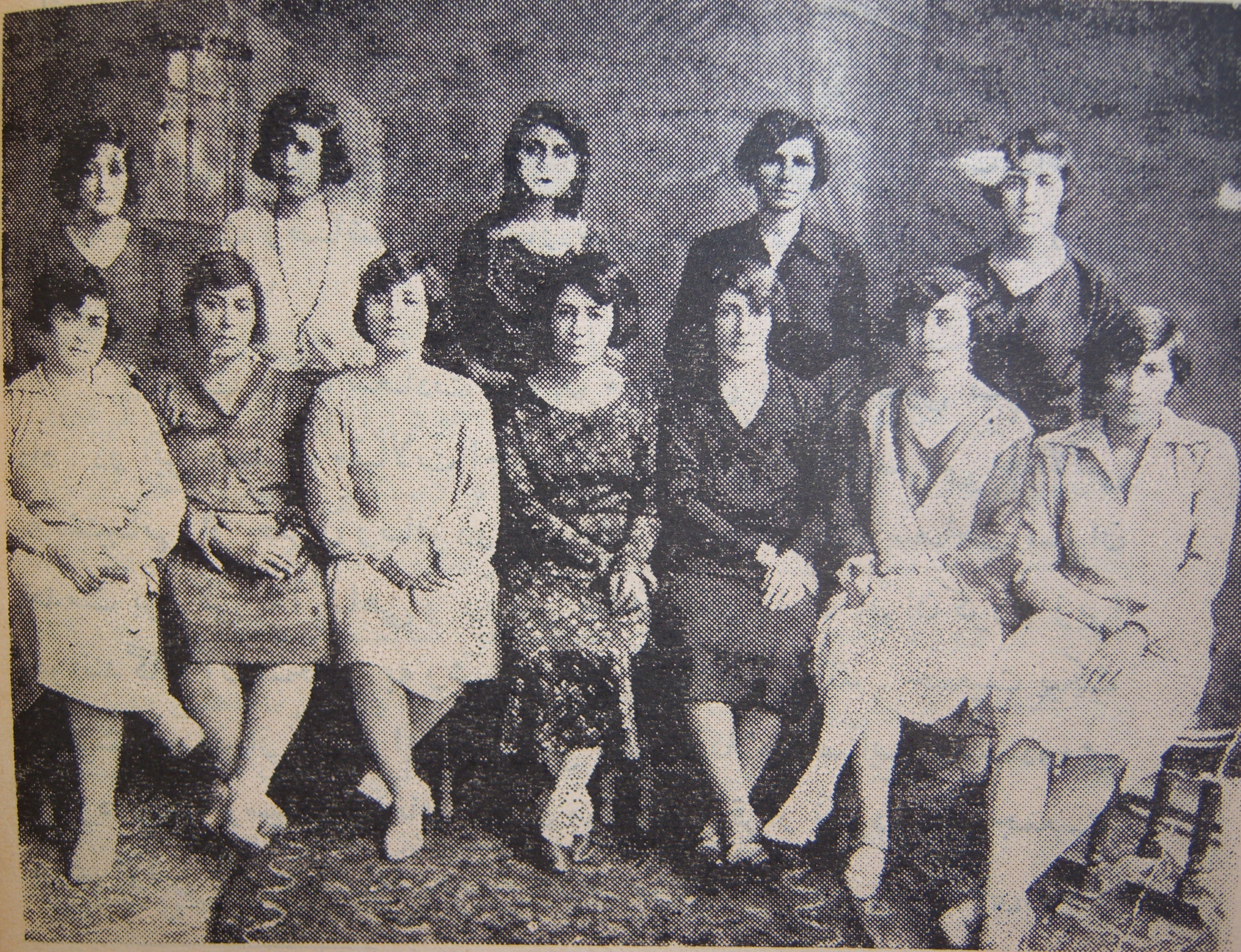
Board of Governors of Association of Patriotic Women [Jam'iyat-e Nesvan-e Vatankhah], Tehran, 1922–1932. FakhrAfagh Parsa is seated first from the left.

FakhrAfagh Parsa (Persian: فخرآفاق پارسا; born in Tehran in 1898), was a journalist during the Iranian Constitutional Revolution and a member of the Women's Movement in Iran. She was the mother of Farrokhroo Parsa, the first female minister in the cabinet of Amir-Abbas Hoveyda.

== Early life ==
She was the director of Women's World magazine and the first female journalist in Iranian history to be exiled. She was exiled for two years, but when she returned, she joined the Jam'iyat-e Nesvan-e Vatankhah.

== Jahan-e Zanan ==
Women's World was first published in 1920 (or 1922) with the aim of "understanding the need for women's education" and "familiarizing them with their rights" by Farrokhdin Parsa and his wife, FakhrAfagh Parsa, in Mashhad.

This magazine, which was initially published fortnightly, focused on subjects related to the freedom of women in European style and the equality of rights.

The first subject of the magazine, published by the management of FakhrAfagh Parsa, had a moderate tone about women's education and the need for them to be educated. But, after publishing an editorial about the equal rights of women and men, a number of men came up against her. Some thugs also looted her house in support of those who had condemned her against religion.

== Troublesome Articles ==
FakhrAfagh Parsa, in the fourth subject of the publication of Women's World magazine, wrote two articles that created a lot of troubles and problems. The two articles, titled "The Necessity of Girls' Education" and "Women's Spiritual Tolerance and the Need for Revision of the Marriage law", sparked the anger of the clergy, causing exile and many problems for her and her family.

== Exile ==
After publishing troublesome articles in Mashhad, the fifth subject of the magazine Women's World was published in Tehran. The publication of an article entitled "From Now" which was about inviting women to co-operate with men had grown so much excitement between the people that the editor and editor of the magazine (Farrokhdin and FakhrAfagh Parsa) were both banished to Arak on charges of opposition to religion.

After her exile, Arak clerics introduced her as the enemy of Islam, so FakhrAfagh, knowing the execution of several people, fled to Qom with her family for a religious cleansing in Arak, and, in coordination with the government officials there, she managed to exile in Qom.

== See also ==
- Women's rights movement in Iran
- Women's rights in Iran
- Women in Iran
- Jam'iyat-e Nesvan-e Vatankhah
- List of Iranian women journalists
