= William Hudson (botanist) =

British botanist and apothecary (1730–1793)

William Hudson FRS (1730 in Kendal – 23 May 1793) was a British botanist and apothecary based in London. His main work was Flora Anglica, published in 1762. He was elected a fellow of the Royal Society in 1761.

== Life and work ==
Hudson was born between 1730 and 1732 at the White Lion Inn, Kendal, which was kept by his father. He was educated at Kendal grammar school,

Hudson was subsequently apprenticed to an apothecary in London. He obtained the prize for botany given by the Apothecaries' Company which was a copy of Ray's Synopsis. However, he also paid attention to mollusca and insects and in Pennant's British Zoology he is mentioned as the discoverer of Trochus terrestris. From 1757 to 1768 Hudson was resident sub-librarian of the British Museum, and his studies in the Sloane herbarium enabled him to adapt the Linnean nomenclature to the plants described by Ray far more accurately than did John Hill in his Flora Britannica of 1760.

In 1761 Hudson was elected a Fellow of the Royal Society, and in the following year the first edition of his Flora Anglica appeared, which, according to Pulteney and J. E. Smith, "marks the establishment of Linnean principles of botany in England." Smith writes that the work was "composed under the auspices and advice of Benjamin Stillingfleet". Hudson, at the time of its publication, was practising as an apothecary in Panton Street, Haymarket, and from 1765 to 1771 acted as 'praefectus horti' to the Apothecaries' Company at the Chelsea Physic Garden. He communicated with Linnaeus and sent plants to him.

A considerably enlarged edition of the Flora appeared in 1778 and he planned a Fauna Britannica. However, in 1783 his house in Panton Street caught fire, his collections of insects and many of his plants were destroyed, and the people narrowly escaped with their lives. Hudson retired to Jermyn Street.

In 1791 he joined the newly established Linnean Society. He died in Jermyn Street from paralysis on 23 May 1793, being, according to the Gentleman's Magazine, in his sixtieth year. Hudson was buried in St James's Church in Westminster, London.

He bequeathed the remains of his herbarium to the Apothecaries' Company and some have subsequently been transferred to the herbaria at the Royal Botanic Gardens and the Natural History Museum in London.

Linnaeus gave the name Hudsonia to a North American genus of Cistaceae.

== Selected works ==
- Flora Anglica (1762) –1798 printing

== See also ==
- Category:Taxa named by William Hudson (botanist)
