= Revolutionary Anarchist Front =

Chilean urban guerrilla group

- Frente Anarquista Revolucionario
- The group stated that they do not wish to use any emblem, but if anyone else needs a symbol to represent them, they recommend using the anarchist symbol with a rifle.
- Dates active: 2007–14 January 2009
- Country: Chile
- Active regions: Santiago Metropolitan Area
- Ideology: Anarcho-communism; Anti-authoritarianism; Anti-capitalism; Anti-fascism; Anarchism without adjectives Insurrectionary anarchism Libertarian Marxism
- Political position: Far-left
- Status: Inactive

The Revolutionary Anarchist Front (Spanish: Frente Anarquista Revolucionario, FAR) was an urban guerrilla group that was active in the Santiago Metropolitan Area, responsible for various sabotage, arson and explosive attacks. The group gained media attention for the attacks it carried out and was awarded.

== Context ==
Since the mid-2000s there has been an outbreak of explosive attacks where they commonly attacked their targets with homemade explosives, commonly filled with gunpowder or any medium-strength explosive, causing material damage. About two-thirds of the bombs detonated, and the rest were deactivated. Targets include banks (about a third of the bombs), police stations, army barracks and offices, churches, embassies, the headquarters of political parties, company offices, courthouses and government buildings, as well as detonates late in the morning. Night, and there are seldom injuries among passers-by, none seriously.

== Attacks ==
In the group's first communiqué, it claimed responsibility for an explosion in a group of houses belonging to members of the Carabineros de Chile in the Lo Espejo commune, resulting in material damage according to the group, although it was not reported by the press. On 14 August 2008, the group set fire to the headquarters of the Christian Left Party, in the commune of Santiago Centro, this while the party leadership and some militants were still inside the building. The fire left significant damage to the party headquarters and neighboring buildings. The following day, the group claimed responsibility for the attack.

The group continued to issue statements during the month of September and October, calling for roadblocks and clashes against the Carabineros in the Lo Espejo and San Bernardo communes, where it claimed responsibility for having injured Carabinero Esteban Cheuqueñir Rivera, this during the riots of 11 September. On 7 October, the group placed an explosive of 400 grams of TNT in the offices of the Sociedad de Fomento Fabril (SOFOFA). Around two thousand people who worked in the building were evacuated. The GOPE managed to defuse the bomb a few minutes before it exploded. This was the group's most publicized incident. The next day the group claimed responsibility for the explosive, and also for an alleged sabotage in the Santiago Metro, although the latter was reported as a common failure in the electrical system of the tracks.

Days later, on 20 October, the group claimed the arson attack against the headquarters of the Christian Democratic Party, in the Recoleta commune, causing serious damage to the building, with damages that approach 20 million pesos. The attack caused outrage among the political class, especially because it was during the prelude to the 2008 Chilean municipal election. After this attack, the group claimed an alleged sabotage that neither the press nor the authorities confirmed.

On 26 November, the group claimed the fire of the Teletón Theater in Santiago, which left slight material damage, and also claimed the burning of a building belonging to Automotora Gomá, this in the city of Temuco, leaving it completely burned to the ground, while two vehicles and several others suffered considerable damage. The intensity of the fire required three fire companies to come to the scene to put out the flames.

At the end of 2008, the group was accused by other anarchist cells of executing a false flag attack, due to the complexity of some attacks, as well as the short time between the attacks. After this, the group produced a clarifying letter justifying its actions. The group's last statement was released on 14 January 2009, when they were awarded a false explosive in the offices of SERVIPAG, in the Lo Espejo commune, that the authorities and the press did not report.

== See also ==
- Anarchism in Chile
