= Perseus (disambiguation) =

Perseus is a figure in Greek mythology.

Perseus may also refer to:

== People ==
- Perseus (geometer), ancient Greek mathematician
- Perseus of Macedon, last king of Macedon
- Perseus of Pylos
- Perseus Karlström (born 1990), Swedish racewalker
- Perseus (spy), a Soviet spy at White Sands Missile Range

=== Fictional characters ===
- Perseus (Pantheon), a fictional character in Marvel Comics
- Perseus "Percy" Jackson, the main protagonist of the children's book series Percy Jackson & the Olympians
- Perseus, a fictional character in the light novel series Campione! and its derived works
- Perseus, a fictional factions in the video game call of duty series Black Ops Cold War
- Perseus, the code name for Dr. Howard Busgang in the TV Series Chuck

== Places ==
- Mount Perseus, an ice dome on Candlemas Island, South Sandwich Islands
- Mount Perseus (British Columbia), a mountain in Canada
- Perseus Crags, a group of nunataks in Palmer Land, Antarctica
- Perseus Peak, a summit in the Cook Mountains, Antarctica

== Astronomy ==
- Perseus (constellation), a constellation in the northern sky
- Perseus Arm, an arm of the Milky Way
- Perseus Cluster, a galaxy cluster
- Perseus–Pisces Supercluster, galaxy cluster chain
- Perseus molecular cloud, a giant gas and dust cloud
- Perseids, a prolific meteor shower associated with the comet Swift-Tuttle

== Ships ==
- HMS Perseus, any of several ships of the Royal Navy
- USNS Perseus (T-AF-64), a 1944 American stores ship
- USS Perseus (WPC-114), a U.S. Coast Guard ship built by Bath Iron Works (1932)
- Perseus (Soviet ship), a Soviet arctic research ship (1922–1941)
- Perseus (1799 ship), an English sailing ship

== Mythology ==
- Perseus (son of Nestor), a son of Nestor and Eurydice (or Anaxibia) who appears in the Odyssey

== Other uses ==
- Perseus (munition), a 900 kg (2,000 lb) bomb made in Greece
- "Perseus" (song), a song by Hitomi Shimatani
- Perseus Books Group, a publishing company
- Perseus Project, a digital library
- Perseus, a GWR Iron Duke Class steam locomotive
- Bristol Perseus, an aero engine
- CVS401 Perseus, a supersonic cruise missile concept
- Ferranti Perseus, a British vacuum tube (valve) computer
- UGM-89 Perseus, a cancelled project for an American missile
- Hero Perseus, a special unit in the video game Age of Empires
- perseus, the code name of the Xiaomi Mi MIX 3 smartphone

== See also ==
- Perses (disambiguation)
- Perseus and Andromeda (disambiguation)
