= Persia gens =

Families from Ancient Rome who shared the Persius nomen

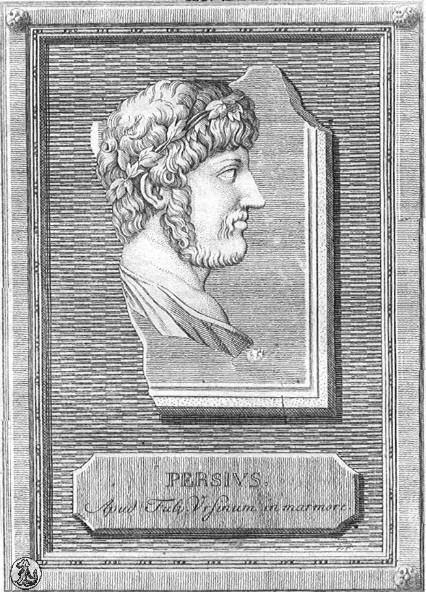
The poet, Aulus Persius Flaccus. Modern woodcut.

The gens Persia was a minor plebeian family at ancient Rome. Members of this gens are first mentioned during the Second Punic War, but they only occasionally occur in history. The most illustrious of the family was the satirist Aulus Persius Flaccus, who lived during the middle part of the first century.

== Origin ==
The Persii Flacci are known to have been from Volaterrae in Etruria, and a number of other Persii are found in inscriptions from Volaterrae, as well as the neighboring city of Populonia. It therefore appears that the Persii were originally an Etruscan family, some of whom had settled at Rome by the third century BC. One of the Persii living in Dalmatia bore the surname Etruscus, further indicating that the family claimed Etruscan descent.

== Praenomina ==
The chief praenomina of the Persii were Aulus, Gaius, and Lucius, all of which were common names throughout Roman history. A few other names are known from inscriptions, including Marcus, Quintus, and Titus, but they do not seem to have been regular praenomina of this gens.

== Branches and cognomina ==
The only families of the Persii known to have been distinguished by their surnames bore the cognomina Flaccus and Severus. Flaccus, a common surname that translates as "flabby", "droopy", or "flop-eared", was borne by the family of the poet. Severus, also a common surname, meaning "serious" or "stern", belonged to another family of Volaterrae. Of the other surnames found among the various Persii, Hybrida was used of the merchant Persius, because his father was Roman and his mother Greek; Etruscus signified the Etruscan descent of its bearer; and Lepidus, more famous from a family of the Aemilii, referred to someone who was pleasant or agreeable.

== Members ==
This list includes abbreviated praenomina. For an explanation of this practice, see filiation.

- Gaius Persius, an officer serving under Marcus Livius Macatus, commander of the Roman garrison at Tarentum during the Second Punic War. In 210 BC, Persius led a charge of 2,500 men against a Tarentine force of 4,000 that had been sent to forage in the nearby fields, utterly destroying and dispersing the Tarentines.
- Gaius Persius, a very learned man in the time of the Gracchi. Cicero reports that the satirist Lucilius did not want Persius to read his work, for fear that Persius would disapprove; and that some believed him the author of a famous speech delivered by Gaius Fannius Strabo against Gaius Gracchus.
- Persius Hybrida, a wealthy merchant at Clazomenae, was involved in a lawsuit with the praetor Publius Rupilius Rex in 43 BC. In one of his satires, Horace describes the invective that they hurled at one another, concluding with Persius' desire for the propraetor Brutus to rid the world of another "king".
- Persius Flaccus, father of the satirist, married Fulvia Sisennia. He died circa AD 40, and his widow married an eques named Fusius.
- Aulus Persius Flaccus, the satirist, was from an early age acquainted with a number of leading literary figures at Rome. He died while still a young man, during the reign of Nero. His extant work consists of six short satires, which were left in an unfinished state at his death, and edited by his friend, the poet Caesius Bassus.
- Persia, named in several inscriptions from Volaterrae in Etruria, probably referring to different women.
- Persia L. f., buried at Epora in Hispania Baetica.
- Persius M. f., a soldier in the tenth legion, buried at Asturica Augusta in Hispania Citerior, aged fifty, having served twenty-six years.
- Gaius Persius A. f., buried at Populonia in Etruria, with a monument dating to the reign of Augustus.
- Lucius Persius C. f., buried at Populonia during the reign of Augustus.
- Quintus Persius, named in a libationary inscription from Thignica in Africa Proconsularis.
- Lucius Persius Diallus, a collector of the tax on silversmiths, buried at Corduba in Hispania Baetica.
- Aulus Persius Etruscus, the husband of Novia Lepida, and father of Aulus Persius Lepidus, to whom he dedicated a monument at Salona in Dalmatia.
- Aulus Persius A. f. Lepidus, the son of Aulus Persius Etruscus and Novia Lepida, buried at Salona.
- Persia Meroe, buried at Aquileia in Venetia and Histria.
- Persia C. f. Polla, buried at Populonia during the reign of Augustus.
- Persia L. f. Secunda Patriciensis, buried at Corduba, aged twenty-two.
- Aulus Persius Severus, husband of Vergilia Saturnina, and father of Aulus Persius Severus, to whom he dedicated monuments at Volaterrae.
- Aulus Persius A. f. Severus, son of Aulus Persius Severus and Vergilia Saturnina, buried at Volaterrae, aged eight years, three months, and nineteen days.
- Lucius Persius L. f. Severus, buried at Thibilis in Numidia, aged eighty-one.
- Titus Persius Tertius, buried at Augusta Taurinorum in Cisalpine Gaul.
- Gaius Persius Victor, named in a libationary inscription from Thignica.

== See also ==
- List of Roman gentes

== Bibliography ==
- Marcus Tullius Cicero, Brutus, De Finibus Bonorum et Malorum, De Oratore.
- Quintus Horatius Flaccus (Horace), Satirae (Satires).
- Titus Livius (Livy), History of Rome.
- Marcus Valerius Probus, Vita Auli Persii Flacci de Commentario Probi Valerii Sublata (The Life of Aulus Persius Flaccus, with Commentary by Valerius Probus).
- Dictionary of Greek and Roman Biography and Mythology, William Smith, ed., Little, Brown and Company, Boston (1849).
- Theodor Mommsen et alii, Corpus Inscriptionum Latinarum (The Body of Latin Inscriptions, abbreviated CIL), Berlin-Brandenburgische Akademie der Wissenschaften (1853–present).
- Notizie degli Scavi di Antichità (News of Excavations from Antiquity, abbreviated NSA), Accademia dei Lincei (1876–present).
- René Cagnat et alii, L'Année épigraphique (The Year in Epigraphy, abbreviated AE), Presses Universitaires de France (1888–present).
- George Davis Chase, "The Origin of Roman Praenomina", in Harvard Studies in Classical Philology, vol. VIII (1897).
- Paul von Rohden, Elimar Klebs, & Hermann Dessau, Prosopographia Imperii Romani (The Prosopography of the Roman Empire, abbreviated PIR), Berlin (1898).
- Stéphane Gsell, Inscriptions Latines de L'Algérie (Latin Inscriptions from Algeria, abbreviated ILAlg), Edouard Champion, Paris (1922–present).
- T. Robert S. Broughton, The Magistrates of the Roman Republic, American Philological Association (1952).
