= Women's World (Iranian magazine) =

Iranian magazine

- Editor: FakhrAfagh Parsa
- Categories: Women's magazine
- Frequency: Weekly
- Founded: 1920
- First issue: 1922
- Final issue: 1923
- Country: Iran
- Based in: Mashhad, Tehran
- Language: Persian

Women's World, or Jahan-e Zanan (Persian: جهان زنان), was a Persian-language women's magazine published 1922–1923 and dedicated to women's rights and education. FakhrAfagh Parsa began publishing this magazine in Mashhad in 1920, and later continued its publication in Tehran. In spite of the intentional adoption of moderate tone when speaking on women's education, the publication of the magazine was not an unlucky one. After publishing the editor's letter about the discovery of veil and equal rights, in a number of magazines, the author was disgraced and condemned. Afagh Parsa was eventually exiled to Qom and the evaluation of Women's World was canceled.

== Women’s World Magazine ==
The magazine Women's World was first published in 1920 with the aim of "understanding the need for women's education” and "familiarizing them with their rights" by Farrokhdin Parsa and his wife, FakhrAfagh Parsa, in Mashhad.

The magazine, which was first published every two weeks, focused on subjects related to the freedom of women in European style and the equality of rights.

The first edition of the magazine, published by the management of FakhrAfagh Parsa, had a moderate tone about women's education and the need for them to be educated. But, after publishing an editorial about the equal rights of women and men, a number of men came up against her. Some thugs also looted her house in support of those who had condemned her against religion.

== Troublesome Articles ==
FakhrAfagh Parsa, in the fourth edition of the publication of Women's World Magazine, wrote two articles that created a lot of trouble and problems. The two articles, titled "The Necessity of Girls' Education” and “Women's Spiritual Tolerance and the Need for Revision of the Marriage Law”, sparked the anger of the clergy, causing exile and many problems for Parsa and her family.

After publishing troublesome articles in Mashhad, the fifth edition of Women's World was published in Tehran. The publication of an article entitled "From Now" which was about inviting women to co-operate with men had grown so much excitement between the people that the editor and editor of the magazine (Farrokhdin and FakhrAfagh Parsa) were both banished to Arak on charges of opposition to religion.

== Revived magazine ==
The magazine's title was briefly revived in Iran after the Iranian Revolution (see illustration).

== See also ==
- Women's rights in Iran
- FakhrAfagh Parsa
