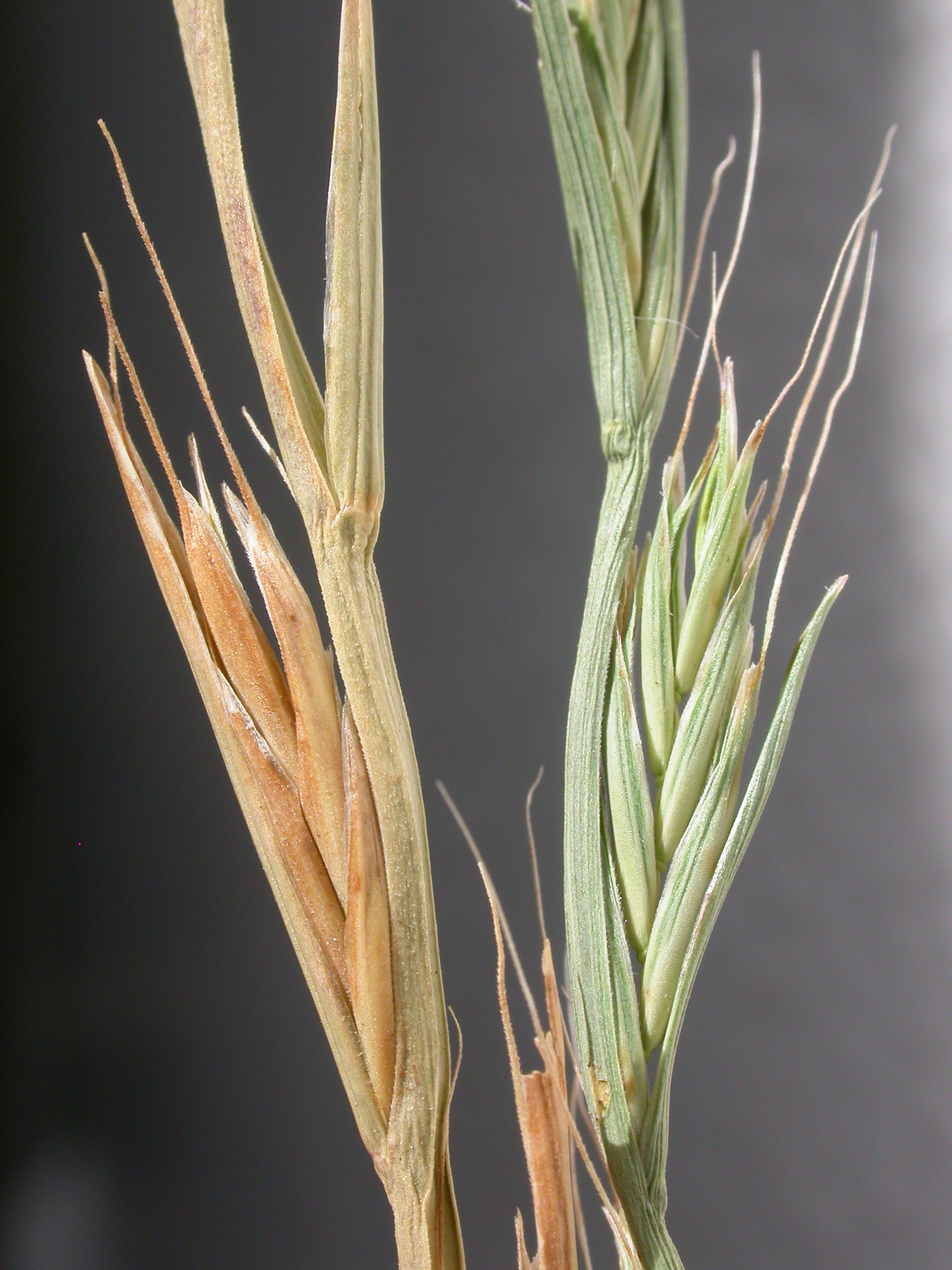

Scientific classification
- Kingdom: Plantae
- Clade: Tracheophytes
- Clade: Angiosperms
- Clade: Monocots
- Clade: Commelinids
- Order: Poales
- Family: Poaceae
- Subfamily: Pooideae
- Genus: Lolium
- Species: L. persicum

Binomial name
- Lolium persicum Boiss. & Hohen.

Synonyms
- Lolium dorei B.Boivin; Lolium dorei var. laeve B.Boivin

= Lolium persicum =

Species of plant in the grass family

Lolium persicum is a species of flowering plant in the family Poaceae. It is referred to by the common names Persian darnel or Persian ryegrass, and is an annual grass. It has an upright stem, branching from a reddish base, up to 45 cm (18 in) tall. Its leaves are lower surface glossy, dark green, 6 mm wide.
