= SS Persier =

Persier was the name of two ships operated by Lloyd Royal Belge.

- SS Persier (1910), bought in 1917, sunk by gunfire from U-35 later that year.
- SS Persier (1918), bought in 1919, to Compagnie Maritime Belge in 1930, torpedoed and sunk by U-1017 in 1945.
