= Fars =

Fars, FARs or FARS may refer to:

== Places ==
- Fars province, Iran
- Fars (territory), or Persia, a region and a pre-Islamic state
- Färs Hundred, a hundred in Sweden
- Fars (river), Republic of Adygea, southwest Russia
- Fars (East Syriac ecclesiastical province), a former ecclesiastical province in the Church of the East

== Iranian media ==
- Fars News Agency, an Iranian news agency
- The Fars, a newspaper based in Shiraz, Fars Province, first published in 1913
- Fars (newspaper), based in Shiraz, Fars Province, first published in 1872

== Acronyms ==
- Fatality Analysis Reporting System, a measure of traffic fatalities in the United States
- Federal Acquisition Regulations (FARs), the rules governing purchases made by the executive agencies of the United States government
- Federal Aviation Regulations (FARs), FAA regulations on aviation in the United States
- Revolutionary Armed Forces of the Sahara (French: Forces armées révolutionnaires du Sahara), a Toubou rebel group in Niger
- Feline Audiogenic Reflex Seizures, a type of epilepsy in cats triggered by sharp noises, particularly common in the Birman breed

== Other uses ==
- Fars Air Qeshm, an Iranian cargo airline based in Qeshm

== See also ==
- Far (disambiguation)
