= Fall of Herat =

2021 Taliban capture of Herat and battle

- Part of 2021 Taliban offensive of the War in Afghanistan (2001-2021) of the war on terror of the Afghan conflict
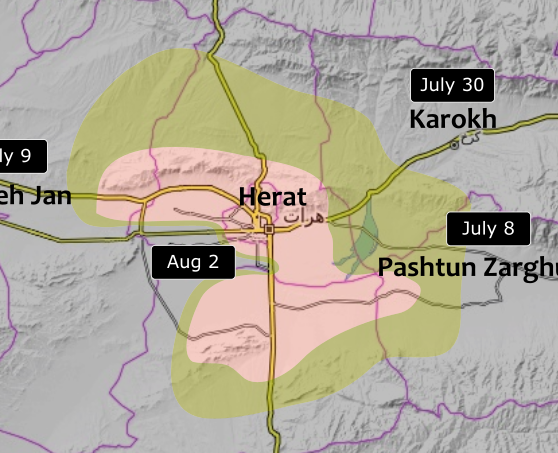
- Situation on 7 August; Pink: Controlled by the government Grey: Controlled by the Taliban; Green: Unclear
Date	28 July – 13 August 2021
Location	Herat, Islamic Republic of Afghanistan 34°20′31″N 62°12′11″E
Result	Taliban victory: Surrender of Afghan National Army's 207th Corps

Belligerents
Taliban	Afghanistan

Commanders and leaders
Abdul-Qayum Rauhani (Taliban commander); Abdul-Karim Jihadyar (Taliban commander); Abdul-Aziz Ansari (Taliban commander)	(Islamic Republic of Afghanistan) Mohammad Ismail Khan (surrendered) (Former Governor of Herat) (Islamic Republic of Afghanistan) Abdul Sabur Qaneh (surrendered) (Governor of Herat) (Islamic Republic of Afghanistan) Abdul Rahman Rahman (surrendered) (Deputy interior minister of Herat) (Islamic Republic of Afghanistan) Kamran Alizai (surrendered) (Herat Provincial Council Chairman) (Islamic Republic of Afghanistan) Hasib Sediqi (surrendered) (NDS Chief for Herat) (Islamic Republic of Afghanistan) Khyal Nabi Ahmadzai (surrendered) (207th Corps Commander) (Islamic Republic of Afghanistan) Colonel Abdul Hamid † (Commander of 1st regiment) (Islamic Republic of Afghanistan) Colonel Mohammad Nasir Alizai (Commander of a Commando unit)

Units involved
Taliban forces	Afghan National Security Forces (ANSF): 207th Corps (surrendered); 1st Regiment; Commando Corps; National Directorate of Security (NDS); Public uprising forces

Casualties and losses
Unknown	Thousands of government forces surrendered
- Location within Afghanistan

The Fall of Herat was a battle and subsequent capture of Herat by Taliban fighters. The attack on the city started around 28 July 2021, and ended in Taliban victory by 13 August of the same year. Several of the surrounding districts fell to the Taliban from June to mid-July, leaving only the city and two other districts in government hands by 10 July. The border crossings in Herat Province were captured by the Taliban on 9 July, raising prices of goods inside the city. Ismail Khan, former governor and warlord, led a public uprising force to assist the Afghan National Security Forces in defending the city.

After fighting started in the city around the end of July, the Taliban launched a significant attack on 30 July, shutting down the Herat International Airport and temporarily taking the road leading to the airport. A few days later, some Heratis chanted "Allahu Akbar" (God is Great) in support of the government forces. The Taliban insurgents launched another significant attack on the city on 12 August, taking the city by night after a two-week siege. Fall of the city forced Ismail Khan and other top government officials to retreat to the provincial airport and the army corps headquarters outside the city. The next day Ismail Khan and other senior security officials including a deputy for the interior ministry, an army corps commander and an intelligence director, along with thousands of government forces, surrendered to the Taliban.

== Background ==
Simultaneously with the withdrawal of most United States troops from Afghanistan, the Taliban had increased the intensity of their offensive in Afghanistan, taking at least 50 districts in May and June 2021. It seemed like the Taliban were capturing districts around provincial capitals, preparing to capture them once foreign forces left. At the end of June 2021, the Italian military pulled out from a base by Herat, allegedly destroying military equipment and not leaving any for the Afghan National Army. At that time, control of Herat International Airport was also handed over to Afghan forces. The last Italian troops arrived back in Italy late 29 June 2021.

=== Fall of districts in Herat Province ===
In January 2019, SIGAR considered all but one district of Herat Province, Shindand District, to be either under government control or government influenced (between government control and contested). On 11 June 2021, the Taliban claimed to have captured Farsi District to the southwest of the city. 6 days later Obe District, which is directly north of Farsi District, fell to Herat's west. By 6 July, Ghoryan District to Herat's east on the border with Iran was under Taliban control, along with Chishti Sharif District to the west.

On 9 July, the Taliban captured eight districts of Herat Province and two major border towns, Islam Qala and Torghundi, in a 24 hour period. Islam Qala is 120 kilometres (75 mi) from Herat and is one of the main border crossings to Iran, bringing in 1.5 billion Afghani annually for the Islamic Republic of Afghanistan. Soldiers fled to Iran for safety. Torghundi is one of two border crossings to Turkmenistan. The eight districts captured were Karukh, Kohsan, Gulran, Kushki Kuhna, Kushk, Shindand, Adraskan, and Pashtun Zarghun. According to reports, five districts fell without a fight. Zendeh Jan District, 43 kilometres (27 mi) from Herat, fell to the Taliban the day before. The attacks and captures of the districts only left 2 districts, Injil and Guzara, plus the city of Herat in government hands. Karokh District was retaken on 23 July, but was only held for a week. On 24 July, the government imposed a curfew for Herat Province and most of Afghanistan's other provinces. Karokh district was retaken on 30 July.

Map of the districts of Herat Province

=== Ismail Khan ===
Following the capture of 8 districts in the province in one day on 9 July, the Taliban advanced close to the city. That same day Ismail Khan, former warlord and prominent member of Jamiat-e Islami, called up his followers to secure and defend Herat and then recapture the surrounding districts. They coordinated their activities with security forces and were deployed by 13 July. The forces he commanded temporarily prevented the capturing of the city by the Taliban and slowed their advance.

== Battle ==
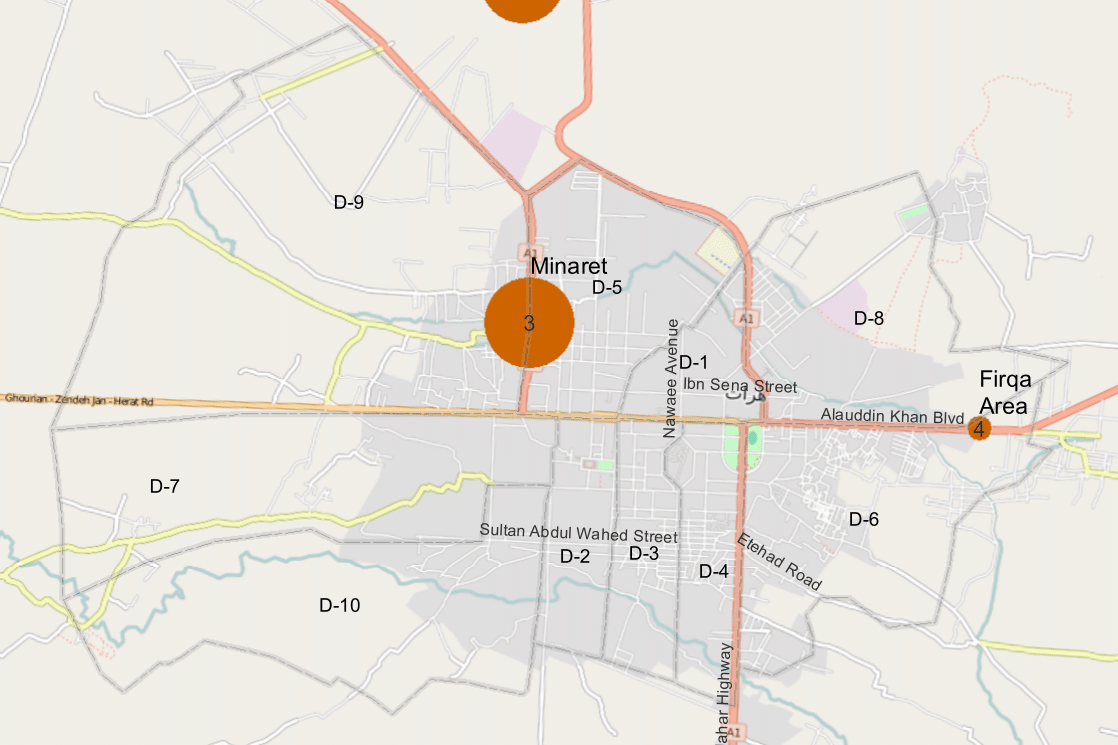
Map of districts of Herat city

Fighting began in the city around 28 July. The next day, fighting reached the Malan Bridge, which crosses the Hari river about 12 kilometres (7.5 mi) south of the city.

The battle was intense on 30 July. The portion of the Kandahar–Herat Highway leading to the airport was under heavy attack. The United Nations office in Herat was also attacked by gunfire and grenades, killing a security guard and wounding others. A Taliban spokesman released a statement saying the office had been caught in crossfire. The commander of the 207th Corps was captured and killed on this day as well. Due to the fighting, all flights were cancelled at Herat International Airport, located 10.5 kilometres (6.5 mi) south of the city. Government forces were able to retake the road going to the airport by the afternoon of the next day.

On 31 July the Malan Bridge was taken by the Taliban after two days of fighting. The next day reporters for Pajhwok Afghan News were briefly taken captive but were quickly released. On 2 August clashes occurred at least 2 kilometres (1.2 mi) from the city center between government aligned forces and the Taliban, mostly in districts 2, 3, 7, and 14. (Note: All districts of Herat numbered higher than 10 are not located on OCHA's map of the city, published in 2016.) Heratis also chanted "Allahu akbar" ("God is Great") in the streets in support of the government and allied forces. Two days later, August districts 2, 3, 10, and 11 were attacked by the Taliban. The police chief for district 10 was killed in the fighting. The Taliban were successfully pushed out of the city.

=== Surrender ===
On 12 August Herat was attacked from four sides. Governor Abdul Saboor Qani said that the Taliban faced a huge response from security forces. That same day in the early evening, Taliban fighters broke through the defensive lines, entered the city, and took control. People were running and screamed that the Taliban were there. Witnesses said there was occasional gunfire at one government building while the rest of the city went quiet. Officials and remaining government forces retreated to a military base and surrendered there the next morning. Shindand Air Base was also taken. According to Khalid Pashtoon, senior adviser to the Afghan high peace council, government troops surrendered in Herat which led to its fall.

== Aftermath ==
Residents reported that the Taliban were searching houses, looking for government workers, guns, and vehicles. Two alleged looters were paraded through the streets as a warning the day after the Taliban captured the city.

Ismail Khan was captured and put under house arrest. According to a member of the provincial council, Khan, the provincial governor, and other officials were handed over as part of an agreement with the insurgents. The capture provided the Taliban with a strong symbol of fading resistance in Herat in addition to claiming that Khan had defected to their side. According to sources close to him, on 16 August he left custody and went to Mashhad, Iran.

A few days after the city fell, some government offices in the city including the electricity department had reopened without female employees. Women also stayed off the streets and men wore more traditional Afghan clothing. On 18 August, girls returned to school. The Taliban handed out hijabs and headscarves at the entrance to the school.

== Significance ==
Herat is Afghanistan's third largest city (with a population of at least two million), lies on important trade routes, and is an important entrance into Iran. It is the largest city in Afghanistan's west, and partially because of that it is an economic hub. Together with the capture of Lashkargah in the Battle of Lashkargah and the fall of Kandahar in the 2021 Battle of Kandahar, their captures were the most significant gains yet in the 2021 Taliban offensive.

=== Effects ===
According to health officials, at least 8 civilians were killed and 260 were wounded in the two weeks of fighting. A hospital said it received 24 bodies and almost 200 wounded people. A Taliban attack on infrastructure in Islam Qala led to the loss of internet in mid-July.

Two weeks after the capture of Islam Qala, the price of cooking oil increased by roughly 50%. Most of the well-to-do in Herat left before Eid al-Adha, which dramatically reduced spending on Eid. According to one seller, his Eid revenues fell by 90%. A sweet maker had his orders cut in half compared to a normal year.

== See also ==
2021 Taliban offensive

- Capture of Zaranj
- Battle of Kunduz
- Battle of Kandahar
- Battle of Lashkargah
- Fall of Kabul
