= Farsi (disambiguation) =

Farsi (Persian: فارسی) is the indigenous name or endonym for Persian. It primarily refers to the Persian language.

Farsi may also refer to:

- Persian people
- Farsi, Afghanistan
- Farsi District in Herat province, Afghanistan
- Farsi Island, an Iranian island off the coast of Fars, Iran
- Farsi village, located in Hormozgan province, Iran
- Farsi1, a Persian-language TV channel
- Hijra Farsi, a Hindustani-based argot spoken by transgender communities in India and Pakistan

== See also ==
- Farsian (disambiguation)
- Persia (disambiguation)
- Persian (disambiguation)
- Iranian (disambiguation)
- Parsi (disambiguation)
