= Afghan rug =

Type of floor-covering

An Afghan rug (or Afghan carpet) is a type of handwoven floor-covering textile traditionally made in the northern and western parts of Afghanistan, mainly by Afghan Turkmens and Uzbeks. The industry has now been expanded to all 34 provinces of Afghanistan.

Afghan rugs have won a number of international awards. They are sold in rugs stores all across the country, particularly in the cities of Herat, Kabul, and Mazar-i-Sharif. Some of the most notable Afghan rugs markets in Kabul are in the Chaman-e-Hozori and Shahr-e Naw areas. The cities of Peshawar, Islamabad and Quetta in Pakistan as well as Dubai in the United Arab Emirates and Istanbul in Turkey are also notable for Afghan rugs markets.

== History ==
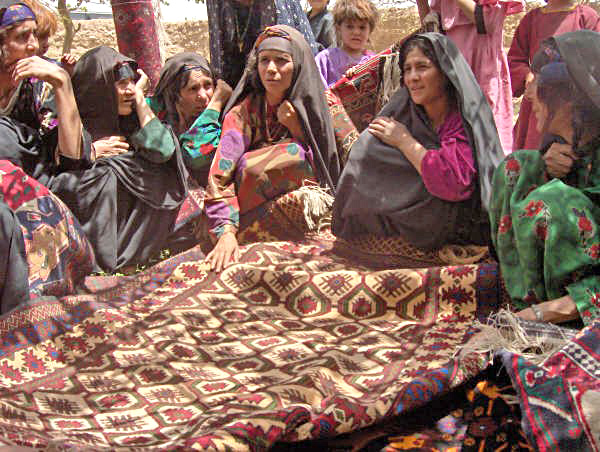
Afghan women showing their Adraskan rugs in western Afghanistan

Weaving rugs in Afghanistan is an ancient tradition and business, which probably existed for thousands of years. The weavers are usually females.

In 2008, 2013, and 2014 Afghan rugs won international awards at an international exhibition held every year in Hamburg, Germany. They also won first position at an exhibition in the United Arab Emirates in December 2014.

Around 1.2 million people are involved in the rug business in Afghanistan. Others have put the number at around 2 million people.

Afghanistan exported over 800,000 square meters of Afghan rug in 2021, which generated about $30 million. Over $8 million worth of Afghan rugs have been exported in the first six months of 2024 to Turkey, the United States, the United Arab Emirates, Italy, and Uzbekistan.

Some Afghan rugs are woven by the Afghan diaspora in Iran and Pakistan. And some Afghan rugs have been sent to Pakistan, where they are given the label "Made in Pakistan" and then exported to other countries. Rug weaving has been one of the jobs women have been able to continue to complete due to the possibility of segregating women workers from men; in Jalalabad, Jamila Saadat established an organisation that aimed to empower women through weaving Afghan rugs.

The Soviet invasion and subsequent wars affected production, both in terms of scale and down quality. According to official figures, as reflected by Parsons, more than 17,000 m2 were exported to Afghanistan in 1979, meaning between 8,000 and 9,000 carpets and rugs. In 1983 exports declined to about 13,000 m2, by 1988 less than 15,000 remained to be returned. In the 1980s, the company sold a lot of old carpets, rugs, and rugs to Afghan families, meaning it was mostly bought by non-residents.

== Types and varieties ==
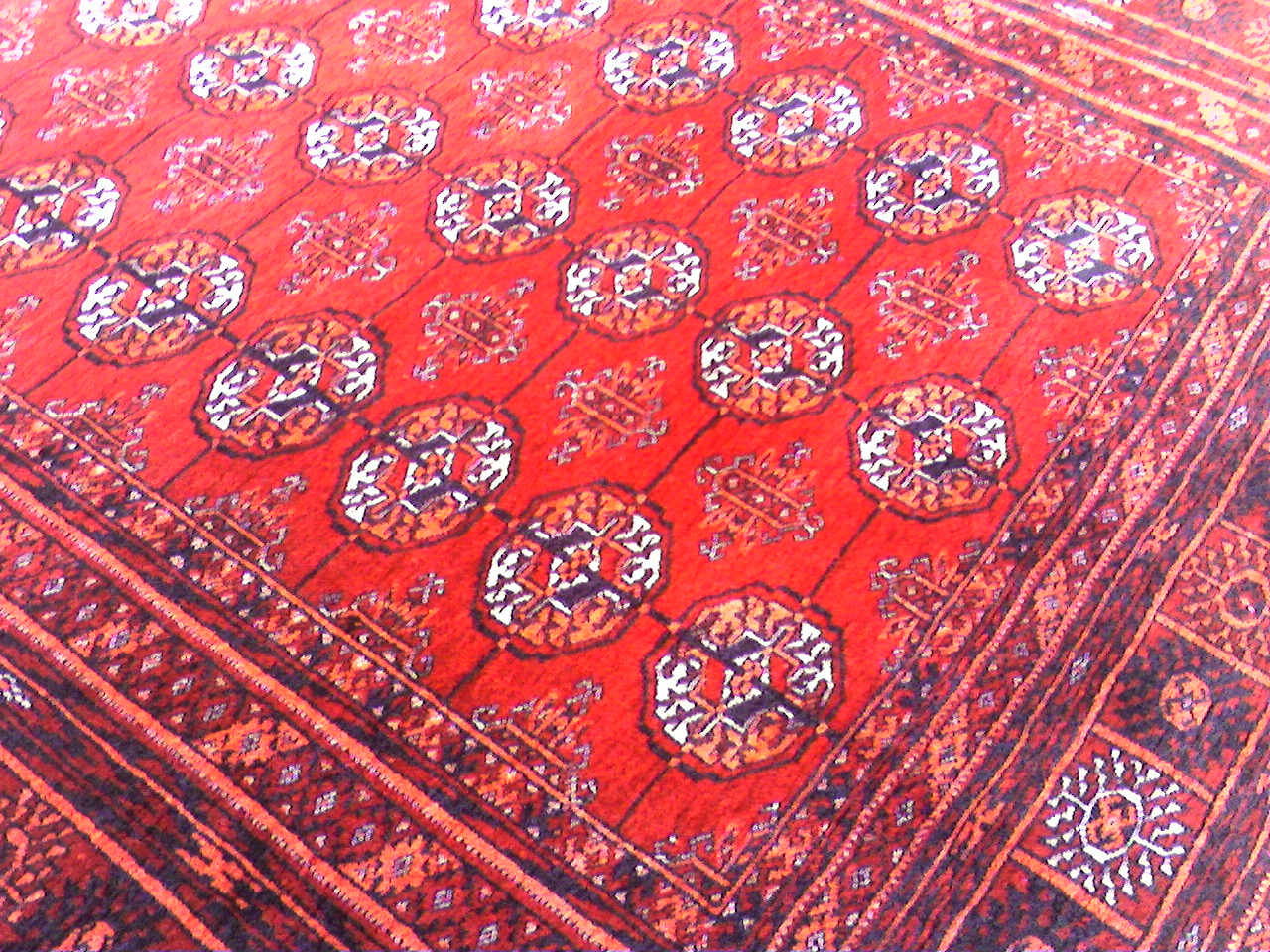
The famous Bukhara pattern

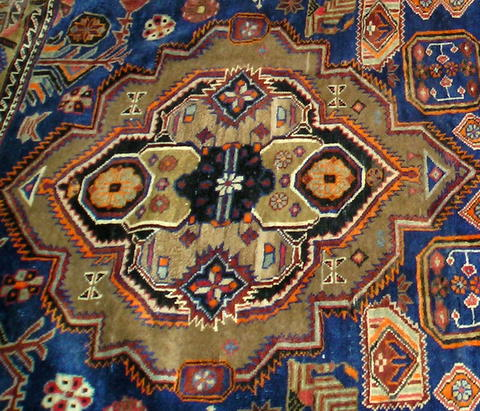
A different Afghan pattern

One of the most exotic and distinctive of all oriental rugs is the Shindand or Adraskan (named after local Afghan towns), woven in the Herat Province, in western Afghanistan. Strangely elongated human and animal figures are their signature look. The carpet can be sold across Afghanistan with the most based in Mazar-e Sharif.

Another staple of Afghanistan is Baluchi rugs, most notably Baluchi prayer rugs. They are made by Afghanistan's ethnic Baloch people in the south-western part of the country.

Various vegetable and other natural dyes are used to produce the rich colors. The rugs are mostly of medium sizes. Many patterns and colors are used, but the traditional and most typical is that of the octagonal elephant's foot (Bukhara) print, often with a red background. The weavers also produce other trappings of the nomadic lifestyle, including tent bags and ceremonial pieces.

Ahcha carpets are woven by the Erazi people in 2 provinces: Samangan and Kunduz. All of these rugs use scribble wool, which is dyed in shades of red, brown, indigo, and black. Usually Ahcha carpets are red, sometimes at the special request of customers are made in other tones, so for example, the central field is made in a color range from light brown to golden yellow shades or also with a dark blue central field and light yellow patterns. Some modern rugs use green for pattern details. In addition to Ahcha rugs, various Bezeheri patterns are also woven in Kunduz (the eastern carpet-producing province of Afghanistan). These common motifs include rows of stylized flowers or flower-shaped hexagons on a central field that run together in the center and are framed by decorated crochet and ram's horn patterns. The center field is usually light red, the pattern is dark red and orange with blue, green, white or black color borders (edging) to better highlight details.

=== Contemporary Afghan rugs ===
In addition to the classical weaving traditions, contemporary Afghan rugs have emerged as an important category within the country’s carpet industry. These pieces preserve many of the characteristics that made Afghan weaving renowned – hand-spun wool, natural vegetable dyes, and geometric or floral motifs – while also reflecting new cultural influences and international market demand. Since the late 20th century, workshops in Kabul, Mazar-e Sharif, Kunduz and other urban centers have experimented with modernized color palettes such as soft blues, greens, beige, and even pastel tones, moving beyond the traditional deep reds and browns.

The combination of heritage and innovation has allowed contemporary Afghan rugs to appeal both to collectors and to households abroad, where they are often marketed as versatile home décor items as well as cultural artifacts. This evolution has been supported by increased export activity to neighboring countries such as Turkey, and to European markets, creating opportunities for Afghan artisans to sustain their craft while adapting to changing tastes.

== See also ==
- Culture of Afghanistan
- Economy of Afghanistan
- Turkmen rug
