= Persian =

Persian may refer to:

- People and things from Iran, historically called Persia in the English language
  - Persians, the majority ethnic group in Iran, not to be conflated with the Iranic peoples
  - Persian language, an Iranian language of the Indo-European family, native language of ethnic Persians
    - Persian alphabet, a writing system based on the Arabic script
- People and things from the historical Persian Empire

== Other uses ==
- Persian Patience, a card game
- Persian (roll), a pastry native to Thunder Bay, Ontario
- Persian wine
- Persian, Indonesia, on the island of Java
- Persian cat, a long-haired breed of cat characterized by its round face and shortened muzzle
- The Persian, a character from Gaston Leroux's The Phantom of the Opera
- The Persians, an ancient Greek tragedy play written by the Athenian playwright Aeschylus in the 5th century BC
- The Persian (Star) - The name of the star Alpha Indi
- Persa (play) or The Persian, comedy by the Roman playwright Plautus
- Persian, a generation I Pokémon species
- Alpha Indi, star also known as "The Persian"

== See also ==
- Persian Empire (disambiguation)
- Persian expedition (disambiguation) or Persian campaign
- Persian Gulf (disambiguation)
- Persian invasion (disambiguation)
- Persian music (disambiguation)
- Persian Sea (disambiguation)
- Persian War (disambiguation)
- Persia (disambiguation)
- Farsi (disambiguation)
- Parsi (disambiguation)
- Parsian (disambiguation)
- Iranian (disambiguation)
- List of Persia-related topics
- List of Persian-language poets and authors
