= Battle of Kunduz =

Battle of Kunduz may refer to:

- Battle of Kunduz (2015)
- Battle of Kunduz (2016)
- Battle of Kunduz (2021)
