= Parsi (disambiguation) =

The Parsis are a Zoroastrian community of South Asia.

Parsi or Parsis may also refer to:

== Places ==
- Parsi, Iran, a village in Mazandaran Province, Iran
- Parsi, Bihar, a village in India
- Pärsi, village in Viljandi County in southern Estonia

== Other uses ==
- Parsi (Tati), Iranian ethnic group from the Caucasus (Tat people)
- Parsi language, the name of several languages
- Proposed unit of currency to replace the Iranian rial
- Socialist Party of Indonesia (Parsi)

== People with the name ==
- Parsee Rustomji (1861–1924), Indian-South African businessman, philanthropist and activist
- Albert Parsis (1890–1980), French footballer
- Arsham Parsi (b. 1981), Iranian LGBT Human Rights activist
- Héctor Campos Parsi (1922–1998), Puerto Rican composer
- Maria Rita Parsi (1947–2026), Italian psychotherapist, writer and television commentator
- Trita Parsi (b. 1974), Iranian policy analyst

== See also ==
- Farsi (disambiguation)
- Parsa (disambiguation)
- Persian (disambiguation)
- Persia (disambiguation)
- Parsian (disambiguation)
- Iranian (disambiguation)
- Irani (disambiguation)
