= Obe =

Obe or OBE may refer to:

== People ==
- Obe Blanc (born 1985), American wrestler
- Obe Geia (born 1989), Australian rugby league player
- Amir Obè, stage name of American rapper and producer Amir Obeid (born 1989)
- Tunde and Wunmi Obe, Nigerian show business couple
- Yumi Obe (born 1975), Japanese former football player and manager

== Places ==
- Obe (Afghanistan), a town in Herat Province
- Obe District, a district in the northeast of Herat Province, Afghanistan

== Education ==
- Outcome-based education, an educational philosophy
- Ottawa Board of Education, the public school board for Ottawa, Ontario, Canada

== Other uses ==
- Officer of the Order of the British Empire (post-nominal: OBE), a grade of the British order of chivalry
- Obe language, a language of Nigeria
- Off-budget enterprise, a type of government body
- Out-of-body experience, an altered state of sensory perception
- Out-of-box experience, an aspect of consumer experience of a product
- Original Black Entertainment TV, a British-based television network that operated between 2003 and 2011
- OBE, IATA airport code for Okeechobee County Airport, Florida, United States
