= Irani =

Irani may refer to the following:

- Anything related to Iran
- Irani (India), an ethno-religious group of Zoroastrian Iranian ancestry in the Indian subcontinent, one of the two Zoroastrian groups in India, the other being the Parsis
  - Irani café, cafes in India operated by them
- Irani, Santa Catarina
- Irani (footballer), Irani Pereira de Brito (1976–2020), Brazilian footballer

== People with the surname ==
- Adi Irani (born 1942), Indian actor
- Anosh Irani (born 1974), Indo-Canadian writer
- Ardeshir Irani (1886–1969), Indian filmmaker, director of India's first sound film
- Aruna Irani (born 1946), Indian actress
- Bakhtiyaar Irani (born 1979), Indian film and television actor, husband of Tannaz Irani
- Boman Irani (born 1959), Indian actor
- C R Irani (1931–2005), Indian journalist, editor-in-chief of The Statesman
- Daisy Irani (television personality), Indian television actress and director
- Daisy Irani (actress) (born 1950), Indian film actress, sister of Honey Irani
- Delnaaz Irani (born 1971), Indian actress
- Dinshah Irani (1881–1938), Indian lawyer, Zoroastrian benefactor in India and Iran
- Faredoon Irani, Indian cinematographer
- Firoz Irani, Indian actor and filmmaker
- Honey Irani (born 1950), Indian actress and screenwriter
- Jenni Irani (1923–1982), Indian cricketer
- Kaikhosrov D. Irani (1922–2017), Indian-American philosopher
- Kashmira Irani (born 1989), Indian film actress
- Kayoze Irani (born 1987), Indian actor, voice artist and film director, son of Boman Irani
- Meher Baba born Merwan Sheriar Irani (1894–1969), Indian spiritual leader
- Mehli Irani (1930–2021), Indian cricketer
- Nariman Irani (–1977), Indian cinematographer and film producer
- Oorvazi Irani (born 1977), Indian independent filmmaker
- Ray R. Irani (born 1935), former chairman and chief executive officer of Occidental Petroleum
- Ronnie Irani (born 1971), English cricketer
- Sanaya Irani (born 1983), Indian actress
- Shayesteh Irani (born 1979), Iranian actress
- Sheila F. Irani (1922–2003), Indian educator and humanitarian
- Smriti Irani (born 1976), Indian actress and politician
- Tannaz Irani (born 1971), Indian actress, wife of Bakhtiyaar Irani

== See also ==
- Iranian (disambiguation)
- Parsi (disambiguation)
