= Battle of Lashkargah =

2021 conflict at Lashkargah

- Part of the 2021 Taliban offensive of the War in Afghanistan (2001-2021) of the war on terror of the Afghan conflict (1978-present)
Date	29 July – 13 August 2021 (2 weeks and 1 day)
Location	Lashkargah, Helmand Province, Afghanistan 31°34′59″N 64°22′9″E
Result	Taliban victory

Belligerents
Taliban	Afghanistan

Commanders and leaders
Abdul-Ahad Talib (Taliban commander); Mawlawi Mubarak † (Red Group commander)	(Islamic Republic of Afghanistan) Sami Sadat (Commander of 215th 'Maiwand' Corps) (Islamic Republic of Afghanistan) Ezzatullah Tofan (Border soldiers commander)

Units involved
Taliban forces; Red Unit	Afghan National Army; 215th 'Maiwand' Corps; Commando Corps; Afghan Border Force; Afghan National Police; United States Air Force

Strength
Unknown	Unknown

Casualties and losses
5,000+ killed (Afghan government claim, denied by Taliban)	Unknown casualties 1,500 surrendered
- Civilian casualties: 104+ killed, 403+ injured
- Location within Afghanistan

The Battle of Lashkargah was fought between the Afghan National Security Forces (ANSF) and the Taliban for control of the city of Lashkargah. The United States supported Afghan forces with airstrikes. The fighting started in late July 2021, and clashes occurred around the governor's residence, NDS headquarters, police headquarters, and prison. The police headquarters was captured by the Taliban on 12 August 2021, and the last government forces evacuated or surrendered in the night from 12 to 13 August 2021. More than 40 civilians were also killed in the fortnight-long fighting.

== Background ==
Lashkargah, the capital of Helmand Province, was previously attacked by the Taliban in October 2020. According to the governor, their attack had been repulsed. Clashes occurred around the city in May 2021. In the weeks leading up to early June, the Taliban conducted several attacks on Lashkargah, mostly around districts 10 and 3 in the city. Those districts briefly fell to the Taliban.

In the weeks before the assault on Lashkargah, the local police forces had mostly deserted their posts. As a result, the defense of an area was mostly carried by local, ill-equipped border soldiers. They were mainly motivated by loyalty to their commanding officer Captain Ezzatullah Tofan, instead of allegiance to the central government.

By 22 July government forces were pulling troops from Majrah District and Garmsir District to reinforce Lashkargah, hastening the fall of those districts to the Taliban.

== Battle ==
The Taliban attacked the city from several directions on 29 July 2021. Around then, the fighting started in Lashkargah, although fighting had been ongoing around it for several weeks. Clashes occurred in the first and seventh district, with government forces holding the ninth. Government reinforcements arrived on 31 July. Taliban and security forces battled near the governor's residence, police headquarters, and NDS headquarters. On August 2 the Taliban captured the government TV building in Lashkargah. Only one district of the city remained in government control and only Kajaki District was under government control out of all the province's districts.

On 3 August, Major General Sami Sadat warned the citizens of Lashkar Gah to leave their homes before the ANA began clearing operations. On August 4 the Taliban advanced to the guard posts of the police headquarters. The Government deployed more soldiers, including commandos. Later that day, the clearance operation began. The Taliban had been contesting the governor's building, police headquarters, prison, and NDS headquarters. Two days later, an airstrike in Lashkargah killed Mawlawi Mubarak, a commander of the Taliban Red Group elite unit. By this point, the Taliban had seized nine districts. On 9 August, the main fighting was in districts one and two. The Government said its forces had cleared the Taliban from these areas.

The Taliban captured the police headquarters on 12 August after a suicide car bombing the previous day. This had been a crucial choke-point. Government security forces retreated to the governor's residence nearby, from where the remaining government forces evacuated by helicopter to Camp Shorabak or surrendered during the night to 13 August, leaving the Taliban in control of the city.

== Impact ==
Between 9 July and 10 August, 183 civilians were killed and 1,181 injured in Lashkargah, Kandahar, Herat, and Kunduz. 40 civilians had been killed on 3 August. The Emergency Surgical Center inside the city was at 90% capacity on 1 August. The capture of the city was likely a significant morale boost to the Taliban, and a source of income with the province's poppy fields.

== See also ==
2021 Taliban offensive

- Capture of Zaranj
- Battle of Kunduz
- Fall of Herat
- Battle of Kandahar
- Fall of Kabul
