= Shindand =

Town in Herat Province, Afghanistan

Shindand شينډنډ
- Location in Afghanistan
- Coordinates: 33°18′13″N 62°8′24″E
- Country: Afghanistan
- Province: Herat Province
- District: Shindand District
- Elevation: 3,497 ft (1,066 m)
- Time zone: UTC+4:30

Shīnḍanḍ (Pashto: شينډنډ), originally Sabzavār (Persian: سبزوار), is a town and the center of the Shindand District, Herat Province, Afghanistan. It is located at 33.3036°N 62.14°E at 1,066 m altitude on the Harut River. The Shindand Air Base is located about 15 miles northeast of the town.

Shindand is at the northern end of Zirko Valley, which is one of main centers of poppy production in western Afghanistan. The town is located south of Adriskan, where a large police training facility exists. The population includes Pashtuns, though Pashtuns make up the majority. The main languages spoken in the area are Pashto. During the Soviet–Afghan War (1979–1989) the 5th Guards Motor Rifle Division was headquartered in the town.

== Etymology ==
The name Shindand means "green pond" in Pashto, a translation of the original Persian name Sabzavār. The town was previously also known as Asfezar.

== History ==
Shindand was once a city of considerable size, and still possesses a fortress with sides of about 200 metres. In the 19th century the city was said to have a diverse population composed of Ghilzais, Durranis (Alakozais, Popalzais, Barakzais), Tajiks, Zuris, Timuris, Jews, and Hindus. By the early 20th century this fortress had been abandoned, and the town, at the centre of a group of villages, was fairly prosperous, with a bazaar of about 800 shops. The plains about Shindand were highly cultivated by the Nurzai Duranis, each village protected by its own little mud fort.

On August 10, 1990, an Antonov An-12 of the Democratic Republic of Afghanistan Air Force (DRAAF) crashed during initial climb after takeoff from Shindand Airport, killing all 83 onboard. This crash was Afghanistan's deadliest until the crash of Kam Air Flight 904 in 2005.

== Climate ==
With an influence from the local steppe climate, Shindand features a cold semi-arid climate (BSk) under the Köppen climate classification. The average temperature in Shindand is 16.5 °C, while the annual precipitation averages 168 mm.

July is the hottest month of the year with an average temperature of 29.4 °C. The coldest month January has an average temperature of 4.1 °C.

Climate data for Shindand
Month	Jan	Feb	Mar	Apr	May	Jun	Jul	Aug	Sep	Oct	Nov	Dec	Year
Mean daily maximum °C (°F)	11.1 (52.0)	13.3 (55.9)	19.4 (66.9)	24.1 (75.4)	30.1 (86.2)	35.8 (96.4)	37.7 (99.9)	36.3 (97.3)	31.9 (89.4)	25.8 (78.4)	18.4 (65.1)	13.1 (55.6)	24.8 (76.5)
Daily mean °C (°F)	4.1 (39.4)	6.6 (43.9)	12.1 (53.8)	16.5 (61.7)	21.8 (71.2)	27.1 (80.8)	29.4 (84.9)	27.4 (81.3)	22.5 (72.5)	16.2 (61.2)	9.4 (48.9)	5.2 (41.4)	16.5 (61.8)
Mean daily minimum °C (°F)	−2.8 (27.0)	−0.1 (31.8)	4.9 (40.8)	9.0 (48.2)	13.5 (56.3)	18.4 (65.1)	21.1 (70.0)	18.6 (65.5)	13.1 (55.6)	6.7 (44.1)	0.4 (32.7)	−2.6 (27.3)	8.4 (47.0)
Source: Climate-Data.org

== Shindand Air Base ==
The Shindand Air Base is located about 15 miles to the northeast of the town, which was occupied by Afghan and NATO's International Security Assistance Force. It is a former Soviet airfield, repaired by U.S. forces. The area is flat and arid, with foothills to the north and west. The Kandahar–Herat Highway, which is part of Afghanistan's Highway 1, passes next to the Shindand Air Base. A free medical clinic supported by the Afghan National Army (ANA) provided free medical care for the population of the town.

== Notable people ==
- Herat Province
- Amanullah Khan
- Ismail Khan

== See also ==
- Azizabad airstrike
