= Pariser =

Pariser is a surname. Notable people with the surname include:

- Eli Pariser (born 1980), American activist and writer
- Nicolas Pariser (born 1974), French film director
- Rudolph Pariser (1923–2021), physical and polymer chemist

== See also ==
- Parisian (disambiguation)
