= Arabian Gulf (disambiguation) =

Arabian Gulf may refer to:

- Persian Gulf, also referred to as the "Gulf of Basra", "Arabian Gulf", or "The Gulf"
  - Persian Gulf naming dispute
  - Arab states of the Persian Gulf, countries of the Arabian Peninsula bordering the Persian Gulf, often referred to as "Arab Gulf states"
- Red Sea, historically known as Sinus Arabicus (lit. Arabian Gulf)
- Arab's Gulf, a large bay near Alexandria, Egypt, also known as "Arab Gulf" or "Arabs' Gulf"

== See also ==
- Arabian Sea
- Persian Gulf (disambiguation)
