= Capture of Zaranj =

2021 Taliban capture of Zaranj

Coordinates: 30°58′N 61°52′E

- Part of 2021 Taliban offensive
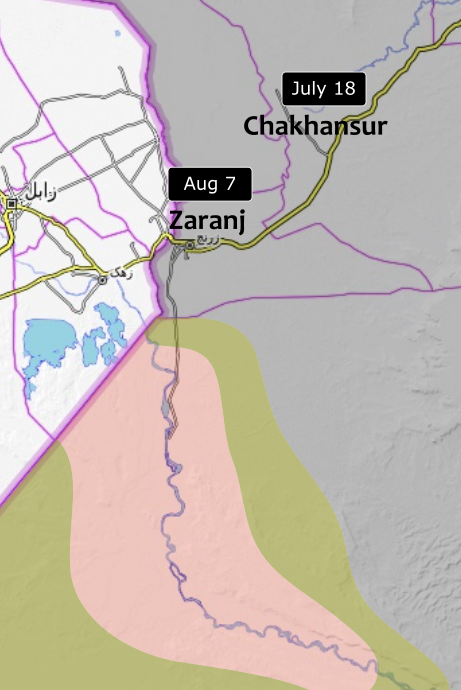
- Map of 2021 Taliban Offensive around Zaranj on 7 August; Grey: Taliban-controlled territory Pink: Territory controlled by the Afghan government Yellow: Unclear/contested
Date	6 August 2021
Location	Zaranj, Afghanistan
Result	Taliban victory: Afghan government officials and security forces either surrendered or fled to Iran and other neighbouring provinces

Belligerents
Taliban	Afghanistan

Commanders and leaders
Abdul Khaliq † (Taliban's governor for Nimruz province); Abdul-Haq Abid (Taliban commander); Muhammad Ayubi (Taliban commander)	(Islamic Republic of Afghanistan) Unknown

Units involved
Taliban forces	Afghan National Security Forces (ANSF): Afghan National Army's 215th Corps; Afghan Air Force; National Directorate of Security (NDS)

Casualties and losses
Minor casualties (according to the Taliban)	NDS personnel defending the city surrendered

The capture of Zaranj, the capital of Nimruz Province, Afghanistan, by the Taliban occurred on 6 August 2021. According to local officials, only the National Directorate of Security (NDS) and its forces had put up a fight against the Taliban, but they too eventually surrendered to the Taliban. Local officials had been requesting reinforcements but received no response. Zaranj was the first provincial capital to be taken by the Taliban in their 2021 offensive and the first one to be captured since Kunduz in 2016.

The Taliban faced little to no resistance while capturing the city of Zaranj. The Afghan government officials and security forces either surrendered or fled to Iran or neighbouring Afghan provinces.

== Background ==
Zaranj had minimal government presence prior to its capture by the Taliban and had never been the target of international military operations. Due to lack of security it was Afghanistan's migrant hub and smuggling center with frequent kidnappings. The government did not have much power inside Zaranj and no presence outside of it in 2017.

Simultaneously with the withdrawal of most United States troops from Afghanistan, the Taliban had increased the intensity of their offensive in Afghanistan, taking at least 50 districts in May and June 2021. It seemed like the Taliban were capturing districts around provincial capitals, preparing to capture them once foreign forces left. In Zimruz province, Chakhansur District and Delaram District were captured close to the Taliban's preexisting strength in Khash Rod District.

Local leaders had been requesting reinforcements without a response for over a week. The army division responsible for defending the area, the 215th corps of the Afghan National Army, decided to focus on defending Lashkargah, capital of Helmand Province, leaving Zaranj weakly defended and vulnerable.

=== August 2021 ===
On 5 August 2021, Kang District close to the city was captured, prompting a flight of government officials from the city and a lowering of morale of the Afghan government forces. An alleged executing of 30 soldiers by the Taliban after taking Kang District might also have reduced morale. Lack of attention from the central government lowered morale further. The night before the capture, an estimated 20,000 Nimruz Province residents fled across the border to Iran.

Some officials said a deal had been struck with the Taliban, letting officials flee to Iran with their families. The head of the provincial council responded, saying officials decided to leave to minimize civilian casualties, denying the making of a deal with the Taliban.

== Battle ==
There was little resistance to the Taliban attack when they arrived around 2:00 pm on August 6. Fighting was brief; without reinforcements from the central government, government forces fought for two to three hours before retreating to the district center of Chahar Burjak District to the south, the last district in the province under government control. Fighting was concentrated by the governor's office and local police and intelligence headquarters. Only the National Directorate of Security and its forces put up a fight against the Taliban.

After the battle was over, the Afghan Air Force dropped airstrikes on the police headquarters and border brigade. One airstrike hit a gathering of Taliban, reportedly killing 14, including Nimruz Province shadow governor Abdul Khaliq.

== Aftermath ==
After the capture, the Taliban broke into the provincial prison and freed 350 inmates, 40 of which were Taliban. People stayed inside their homes, especially government officials fearing revenge attacks. Social media posts showed looting from government buildings. According to a government official, the Taliban had been going house to house searching for government officials. Iran closed the border due to the fighting, turning away fleeing Afghans. Soldiers fled into Iran to escape.

The Taliban continued their offensive, capturing Sheberghan the next day after weeks of intense fighting. Zaranj fell within a day because of a lack of connection to the government in Kabul and international businessmen as local power brokers.

== Significance ==
The Taliban victory boosted the morale of Taliban fighters as it is the first provincial capital they have captured of the 2021 offensive and the first one to be captured since briefly taking Kunduz in 2016, marking a symbolic victory. As the city is very close to a border checkpoint and its importance to Afghan-Iranian trade, it has strategic significance in addition to symbolic significance.

The city of 160,000 is a regional hub and is a significant border crossing with Iran– 420 vehicles carrying migrants traveled from Zaranj to the border each day in July 2021. It is the center of illegal migration in Afghanistan, a place where business and illegal interests govern the province. The capture provides the Taliban with another source of revenue from custom fees; the Afghan government collects 175 million U.S. dollars per year.

It was the last crossing under governmental control, meaning the Taliban gained complete control over Afghanistan-Iran trade. Two other crossings, Islam Qala and Dogaron, were taken in early July and the Milak crossing was already in Taliban hands.

== See also ==
2021 Taliban offensive

- Battle of Kunduz
- Fall of Herat
- Battle of Kandahar
- Battle of Lashkargah
- Fall of Kabul
