= Rostam Giv =

Iranian politician

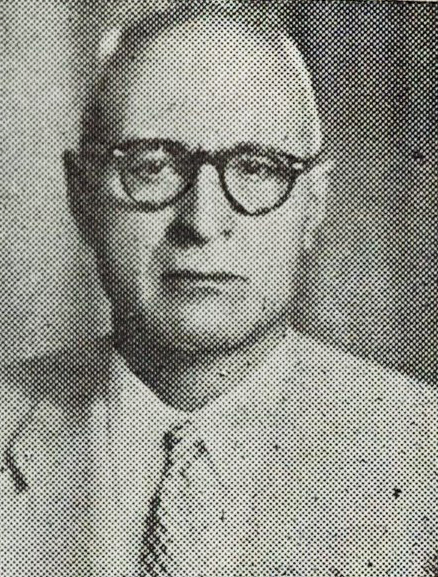
- Rostam Giv the founder of Giv charity foundation

Member of the Senate of Iran
- In office 12 May 1961 – 11 February 1979

Member of the National Consultative Assembly
- In office 6 March 1944 – 12 May 1961
- Preceded by: Keikhosrow Shahrokh
- Succeeded by: Esfandiar Yeganegi
- Constituency: Zoroastrians

Personal details
- Born: 1888 Yazd, Iran
- Died: 7 October 1980 (aged 91–92) Whittier, California
- Spouse: Morvarid
- Parents: Shapour (father); Khorman (mother)
- Occupation: Politician

Rostam Giv or Lord Rostam Giv (Persian: رستم گیو alternative spellings: Rustam Guiv) (1888, in Yazd – October 7, 1980 in Whittier), was the founder of Giv charity foundation, the 3rd representative of Iranian Zoroastrians in Iranian parliament, and a senator of the Iranian Senate.

== Life ==
Giv was born in 1888 in Yazd. His mother's name was Kharman and his father was named Shahpour.

Giv completed his elementary education at Kay Khosravi school and learned English language in Yazd. In 1939, Giv was elected as the Zoroastrian's Representative in Iranian National Assembly after the death of Keikhosrow Shahrokh. He founded "Giv's Charity Foundation" in 1958 for supporting people in need. He was also selected as the senator of the Iranian senate in 1963, due to his charity work for the Iranian people.

== Rostam Bagh ==
Rostam Bagh, is a large apartment complex which is located in the Tehran Pars suburb of Tehran. Rostam Bagh was built by Arbab Rostam Guiv in 1957 for Zoroastrian people and their families who were living in need. The complex has an area of about 25,000 square meters, including residential buildings, a meeting hall, two schools, a sports ground, library and a Zoroastrian fire temple.

== Ab Anbar ==
Construction of a 4000-cubic meter capacity ab anbar (a type of water reservoir) in Yazd to provide clean and safe water for people is another one of Giv's charity works.

== Building Schools ==
Arbab Rustam Guiv has built several schools in Iran, including Giv's Elementary School, Ostad Khdobabakhsh Elementary School, and Ostad Pourdavoud Elementary School, constructed for boys and girls in Tehran. He has also donated 15,000 square meters of land to the Ministry of Education in Damavand County, Tehran.

== Endowments outside Iran ==
A few months before the Iranian Revolution, Rostam and his wife emigrated to the United States where he established his charity foundations. They donated 4 million dollars towards the building of Zoroastrian charities all over the world, including in New York City, Chicago, Toronto, Vancouver, and Sydney, all outside of Iran.

== Gallery ==
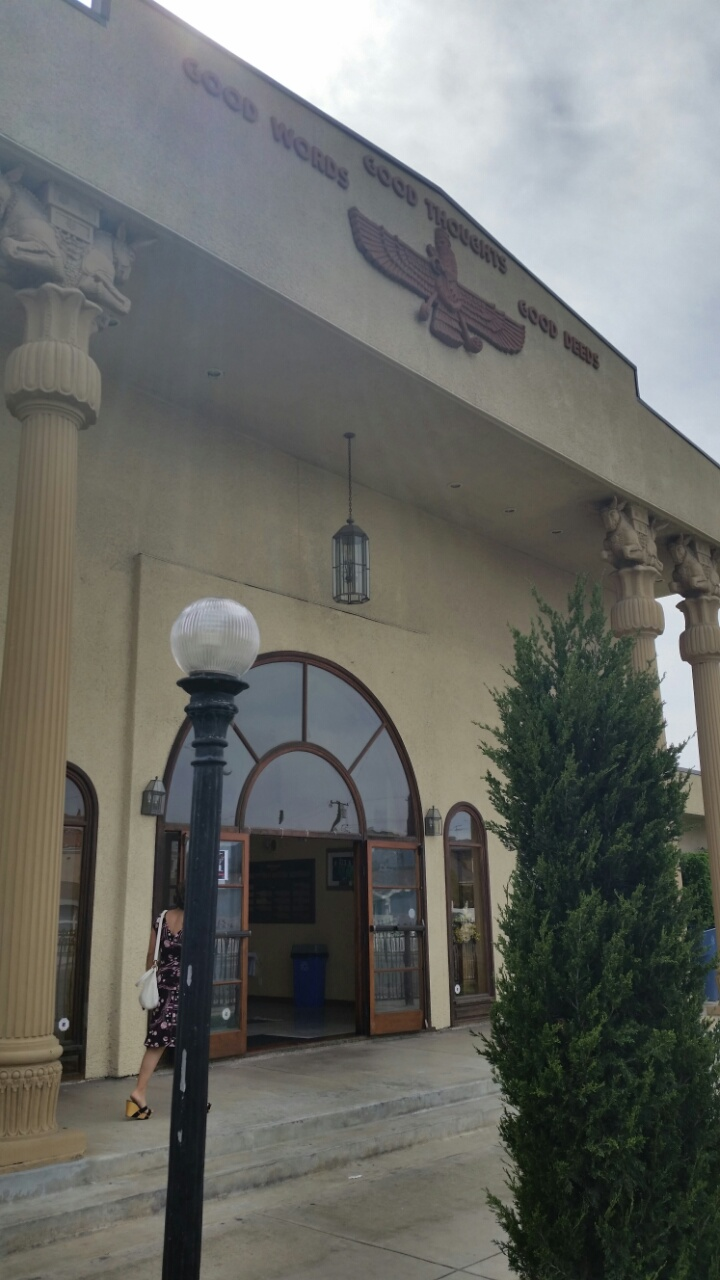
Giv's Darb-e-mehr in Orange County

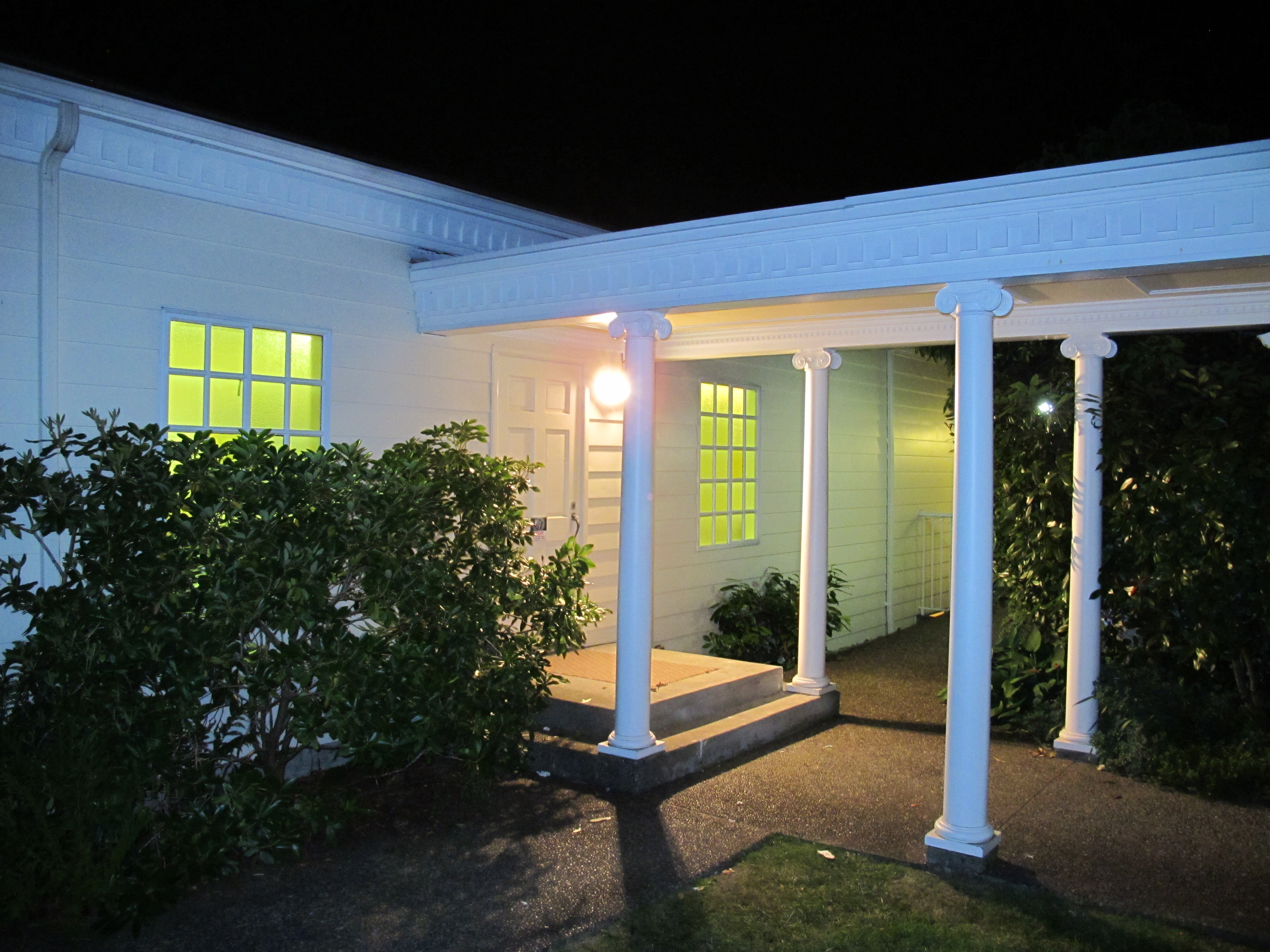
Giv's Darbe Mehr in Vancouver

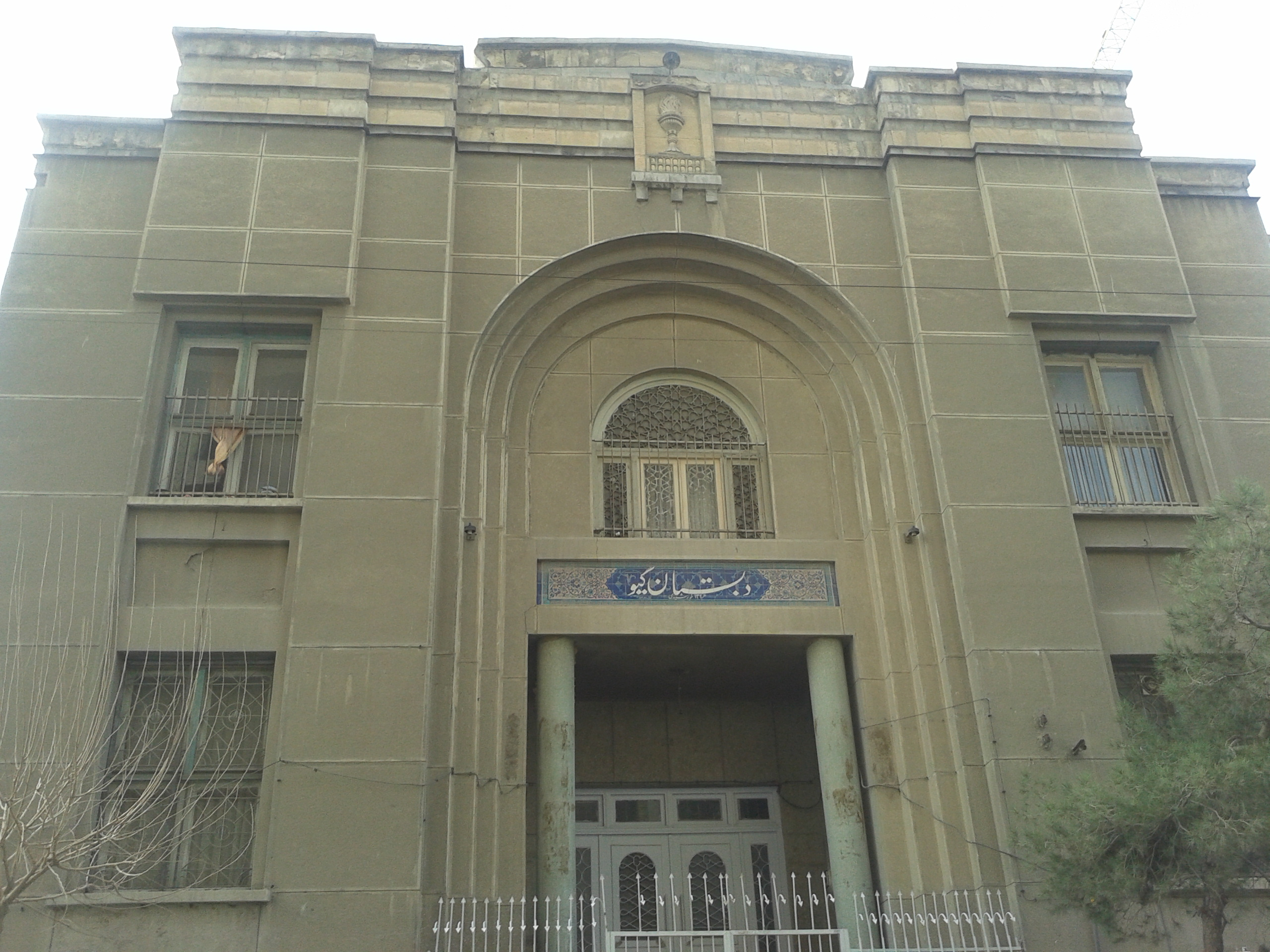
Giv's elementary School in Tehran

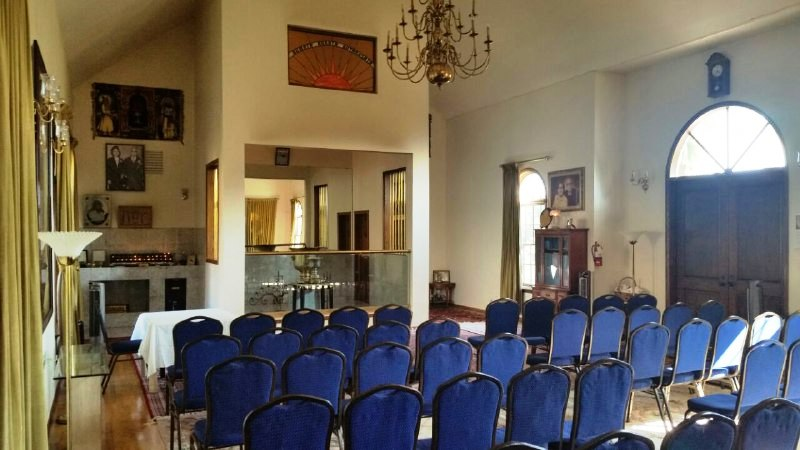
Giv's Darbe Mehr
in San Jose

== See also ==
- Keikhosrow Shahrokh
