= Battle of Kandahar (2021) =

2021 conflict in Kandahar

- Part of the 2021 Taliban offensive of the War in Afghanistan (2001-2021) of the war on terror of the Afghan conflict
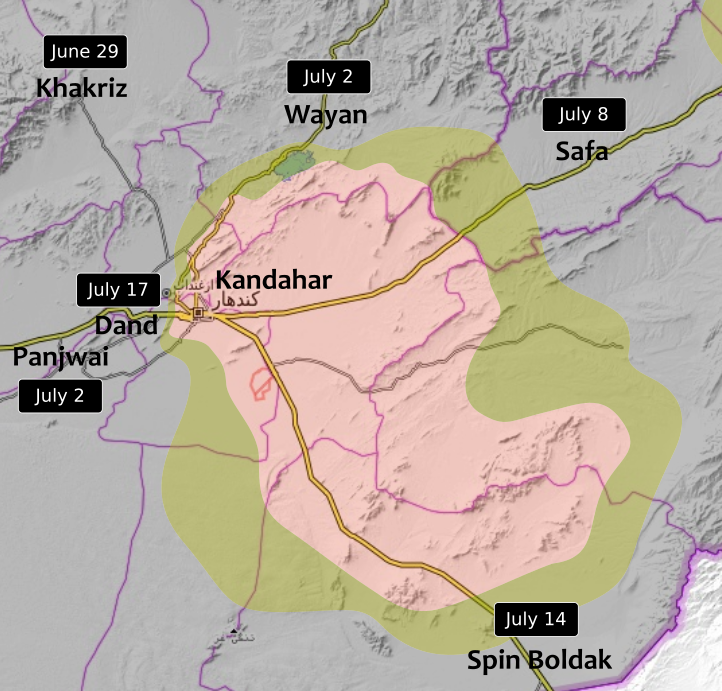
- Kandahar and surrounding regions before capture as of 12 August 2021
Date	9 July – 16 August 2021 (1 month and 1 week)
Location	Kandahar, Afghanistan 31°36′48″N 65°42′59″E
Result	Taliban victory: Successful evacuation of Afghan government officials and military personnel from Kandahar Airport

Belligerents
Taliban	Afghanistan; United States

Commanders and leaders
Haji Yousaf Wafa (Taliban's governor for Kandahar province); Mullah Yaqoob (Chief of Taliban's military commission); Ibrahim Sadar (Mullah Yaqoob's second-in-command)	(Islamic Republic of Afghanistan) Rohullah Khanzada (surrendered) (Governor of Kandahar province) (Islamic Republic of Afghanistan) Ata Mohammad Khan (Head of NDS in Kandahar) (Islamic Republic of Afghanistan) Gen. Sami Sadat (Commander of 215th Corps) (Islamic Republic of Afghanistan) Colonel Sharifullah Sartayib (Police chief of Kandahar province) (Islamic Republic of Afghanistan) Gen. Tadin Khan Achakzai (former Police chief of Kandahar province) (Islamic Republic of Afghanistan) Mohammad Iqbal Nuristani (Unit 03 commander)

Units involved
Taliban forces	Afghan National Security Forces (ANSF): Afghan National Army (ANA); 205th Corps; 215th Corps; Commando Corps; Unit 03; Afghan Air Force; Afghan National Police; National Directorate of Security (NDS); United States Armed Forces: United States Air Force

Casualties and losses
- 100+ civilians killed or wounded
- Location within Afghanistan

The Battle of Kandahar began on 9 July 2021, as Taliban insurgents assaulted the city to capture it from the Afghan National Security Forces (ANSF). After heavy fighting for weeks the city's defenses had started to dissolve in August. This allowed the Taliban to enter and overrun most of the city on 12 August 2021, including the Sarposa prison, which included the release of over 1,000 prisoners, and ultimately the capture of the city. However, the siege for the nearby airport continued, where government loyalists held out until being evacuated on 16 August.

== Background ==
Kandahar, the second-largest city of Afghanistan and the capital of Kandahar Province, was a heavily defended city guarded by Afghan National Army (ANA) forces. However, amidst the 2021 Taliban offensive, the Taliban had led brutal attacks on the city, wearing down the defenses and causing many in the ANA ranks to desert and flee due to fear of being captured by the Taliban. Kandahar continued to be held by a mixed garrison of regular army soldiers, special police, and commandos.

Simultaneously with the withdrawal of most United States troops from Afghanistan, the Taliban attacks had been ferocious, with many provincial capitals falling to the group, ANA forces had to concentrate elsewhere, weakening the defenses of the city. These combined had allowed the Taliban to capture many surrounding districts of Kandahar, including Spin Boldak, Panjwai, and Zhari.

== Battle ==
The battle for the city began on 9 July 2021, as Taliban militants began to raid the urban areas in Kandahar's Seventh Police District and seized several houses. The militants were mainly opposed by commandos and other special forces. The commandos were forced to transfer prisoners from Kandahar prison to prevent an outbreak. The government forces' ability to repulse Taliban infiltrators was hampered by the presence of civilians caught in the crossfire. By mid-July, heavy clashes took place across the city, forcing over 11,000 families to move from Kandahar into refugee camps. The Taliban also captured Kandahar District (also called Dand District), where Kandahar's airport was located. The airport remained government-held, however, allowing the Afghan Air Force to continue its bombing raids on the advancing rebels. However, these aerial attacks had little effect. In response to the unabated rebel attacks, the government imposed a curfew on the city on 16 July, while sending more commandos to assist the defense of Kandahar.

Despite these reinforcements, the insurgents steadily captured more police districts, pushing the government loyalists towards the city center. The Afghan Air Force, assisted by the United States Air Force, continued to bomb the Taliban to no avail. By 22 July 2021, Kandahar was being essentially besieged by the rebels. All surrounding districts save for Daman District had fallen under Taliban control, and only Kandahar's air field remained under full government control. According to the FDD's Long War Journal, the potential fall of Daman District to the insurgents would make it extremely difficult for the government forces to hold onto Kandahar city. At some point in late July, rebels captured Nazar Mohammad in Kandahar, a popular comedian known for his opposition to the Taliban. The insurgents murdered him. The Afghan Intelligence agency, the National Directorate of Security (NDS), also arrested four Afghan journalists in Kandahar. Their arrest was condemned by Amnesty International and other watchdog organisations.

Khalil Ahmad Mujahid, a lawmaker from Kandahar, accused the government of not paying attention to the situation in the province. He blamed the favouritism in appointment of security officials in Kandahar as the reason for collapse of districts in the province.

In early August 2021, the Taliban besiegers were strengthened by reinforcements, allowing them to increase their pressure and forcing the government to send even more troops to hold onto Kandahar. A major attack on the city center was repelled by the commandos with aerial assistance. The Taliban consequently focused on the airport, bombarding it with rockets to reduce the Afghan Air Force's ability to intervene in the fighting. As the city was destroyed by the fighting, the government advised all civilians to evacuate on 5 August 2021. As the battle for Kandahar raged, however, the government was increasingly pressured in other parts of the country as well. Taliban armies captured Herat and Kunduz as a part of their offensive in August.

The government failed to properly supply the besieged troops in Kandahar. The defenders were suffering from a lack of weapons as well as ammunition, while troops deserted to protect their families in rural districts recently overrun by Taliban. Most important, however, was the lack of food. For weeks, local policemen only received half-rotten potatoes; worn down by constant fighting and fed up with the catastrophic food rations, morale in one police unit broke on 11 August. The loyalists' defenses at Kandahar prison then collapsed, allowing the insurgents to free hundreds of inmates and depriving the government of a crucial stronghold, and swelling the attackers' numbers as they enlisted the ex-prisoners. The prison's fall made a continued defense of the city extremely difficult. Local leaders also pressured the governor and military commanders to accept a Taliban ultimatum to retreat. At this point, the frontlines across the city began to fall apart. New York Times reporters consequently argued that the failure of Kandahar's defense ultimately "came down to potatoes".

By late 12 August 2021, Taliban had broken through most of the defensive positions, whereupon the government forces mostly retreated to the governor's palace. In the next hours, most policemen and commandos fled the city, allowing the Taliban to enter Kandahar and solidify their rule in the region. The governor's palace was initially still held by the elite Unit 03, but these troops retreated after being called by the city's governor who informed them that he had agreed to surrender Kandahar to the Taliban. Many soldiers surrendered after the Taliban promised to not harm them; these troops were consequently issued with documents to get through rebel checkpoints and peacefully leave the city. In contrast, the rebels reportedly began to round up civil servants in Kandahar.

However, remnants of the garrison continued to hold onto Kandahar Airport after the city had fallen, including Unit 03. Commanded by Lt. Col. Mohammad Iqbal Nuristani, these troops remained besieged by the insurgents. Iqbal called upon the government, U.S. American military officers, and the Central Intelligence Agency to aid the besieged troops. The defenders hoped to evacuated by air. On 14 August, Lockheed C-130 Hercules transport planes arrived to begin rescuing the remaining troops at the airport, while the rebels continued to bombard it with mortars. Not all could be flown out at once; Nuristani consequently coordinated the evacuation, taking the first flight to Kabul and then returning to Kandahar Airport to help his remaining men. By 15 August, the besieged soldiers were almost out of ammunition and water. That day, they were informed of the capture of Kabul and collapse of the Afghan government. The Taliban gave the airport's defenders a final ultimatum, stating that they could surrender until midnight or die fighting. The besieged troops also ran out of ammunition, but did not surrender; they were rescued on 16 August by Unit 03 soldiers who personally organized aircraft at the U.S.-defended Hamid Karzai International Airport to evacuate them.

== Aftermath ==
The Taliban victory had increased the number of provincial capitals under their control to 13, and foreshadowed the rapid collapse of the Afghan government and Fall of Kabul.

=== Reaction from locals ===
The take over of Kandahar was welcomed by many locals. Hundreds of locals took their motorbikes to the streets to celebrate the takeover of Kandahar by the Taliban. Residents of Kandahar said that shops and markets in Kandahar are open and the situation is now totally normal with people allowed to visit other part of the province without constraint.

== Significance ==
Kandahar is the second largest city of Afghanistan and one of the most strategic, as a key hub to the south of the country. The capture of Kandahar is expected to give the Taliban a major morale boost, as the movement was founded in the city in 1994 during the 1992–1996 Afghan Civil War.

== See also ==
2021 Taliban offensive

- Capture of Zaranj
- Battle of Kunduz
- Fall of Herat
- Battle of Lashkargah
- Fall of Kabul
