= Adraskan =

- Location in Afghanistan
- Coordinates: 33°38′33″N 62°16′2″E
- Country: Afghanistan
- Province: Herat
- District: Adraskan
- Elevation: 4,472 ft (1,363 m)
- Time zone: + 4.30

Adraskan (Pashto: ادرسکن) is a historical town in western Afghanistan near the Harut River.

It was mentioned in 13th and 14th century geographies as one of four prominent towns in the district of Shindand, the Green Place, which, is still called Shindand (Pashto equivalent of Green Field/ Blue Dam). Now the town is the center of Adraskan District in Herat Province, Afghanistan. It is located on 33.6425°N 62.2672°E at 1343 m altitude. The main Kandahar–Herat Highway passes through the town.

During the Soviet–Afghan War, the 68th Guards Separate Engineer Battalion, 5th Guards Motor Rifle Division, 40th Army, appears to have been located here.

== Climate ==
With an influence from the local steppe climate, Adraskan features a cold semi-arid climate (BSk) under the Köppen climate classification. The average temperature in Adraskan is 14.2 °C, while the annual precipitation averages 216 mm.

July is the hottest month of the year with an average temperature of 26.6 °C. The coldest month January has an average temperature of 1.7 °C.

Climate data for Adraskan
| Month | Jan | Feb | Mar | Apr | May | Jun | Jul | Aug | Sep | Oct | Nov | Dec | Year |
|---|---|---|---|---|---|---|---|---|---|---|---|---|---|
| Mean daily maximum °C (°F) | 8.4 (47.1) | 10.9 (51.6) | 16.7 (62.1) | 21.7 (71.1) | 27.4 (81.3) | 32.9 (91.2) | 34.8 (94.6) | 33.7 (92.7) | 39.5 (103.1) | 23.6 (74.5) | 16.0 (60.8) | 10.8 (51.4) | 23.0 (73.5) |
| Daily mean °C (°F) | 1.7 (35.1) | 4.4 (39.9) | 9.7 (49.5) | 14.4 (57.9) | 19.4 (66.9) | 24.4 (75.9) | 26.6 (79.9) | 25.1 (77.2) | 20.1 (68.2) | 14.3 (57.7) | 7.5 (45.5) | 3.4 (38.1) | 14.3 (57.7) |
| Mean daily minimum °C (°F) | −5.0 (23.0) | −2.0 (28.4) | 2.8 (37.0) | 7.1 (44.8) | 11.4 (52.5) | 16.0 (60.8) | 18.5 (65.3) | 16.5 (61.7) | 10.8 (51.4) | 5.0 (41.0) | −1.0 (30.2) | −3.9 (25.0) | 6.3 (43.4) |
Source: Climate-Data.org

== See also ==
- Herat Province
