= Battle of Kunduz (2021) =

2021 conflict in Kunduz

- Part of 2021 Taliban offensive
Date	21 June – 11 August 2021 (1 month and 3 weeks)
Location	Kunduz, Kunduz province, Afghanistan 36.728611°N 68.868056°E
Result	Taliban victory

Belligerents
Taliban	Afghanistan

Commanders and leaders
Muhammad Aka (Taliban commander for Kunduz)	(Islamic Republic of Afghanistan) Ehsanullah Omarzad (surrendered) (Governor of Kunduz) (Islamic Republic of Afghanistan) Najibullah Omarkhel (surrendered) (Acting Governor of Kunduz) (Islamic Republic of Afghanistan) Mohammad Ali Yazdani (surrendered) (Commander of 217th Pamir Corps) (Islamic Republic of Afghanistan) Zabardast Safi (surrendered) (Police Chief of Kunduz) (Islamic Republic of Afghanistan) Taj Mohammad (leader of Afghan commandos)

Units involved
Taliban forces: Red Unit	Afghan National Security Forces (ANSF): Afghan National Army; 217th Pamir Corps; Afghan Commandos; Afghan Air Force; Afghan National Police; National Directorate of Security (NDS) Local anti-Taliban Militia

Strength
21 June–8 August: Unknown; 8–11 August: Additional reinforcements from neighbouring areas; Taliban fighters freed from Kunduz prison	21 June–8 August: Unknown; 8–11 August: 2,000 soldiers

Casualties and losses
Afghan military claim: Heavy casualties	Unknown casualties Hundreds of soldiers surrendered Weapons: A number of military vehicles, equipment and ScanEagle drones captured 1 tank captured, 3 tanks destroyed Two UH-60 Black Hawk destroyed One Mil Mi-24 captured
- Civilian casualties: 39+ killed, 354+ injured
- Kunduz within Afghanistan

The Battle of Kunduz took place between the Afghan National Security Forces (ANSF) and the Taliban for control of the city of Kunduz. The fighting started in late June and lasted until the city was overrun by the Taliban on 8 August. The Afghan government forces, defending the city, withdrew to 217th Pamir Corps headquarters and airport within the city. After resisting for three days, an entire 217th Pamir Corps had surrendered, allowing Taliban to take control of the airport and a number of military vehicles and tanks stationed inside the headquarters.

== Background ==
Kunduz is the strategic city located in northern Afghanistan with routes to Kabul and other major cities in Afghanistan and also Tajikistan. The city was the stronghold of the Taliban before they took over Afghanistan in 1990s.

The city was also briefly occupied by the Taliban forces in 2015 and 2016 before being driven out of the city by Afghan government forces and United States Air Force.

== Battle ==
On 21 June, Taliban captured the entrance to the Kunduz city before dispersing throughout its neighborhoods.

By 23 June, Taliban had laid the siege of Kunduz city after capturing districts in vicinity of the city and the main border crossing with Tajikistan.

On 24 June, an airstrike by an Afghan Air Force in Eighth Police District of Kunduz City killed two Afghan police officers and wounded eight others. The friendly fire incident allowed the Taliban to capture the district.

On 26 June, Afghan government officials said that around 24 Taliban fighters were killed while 15 others were injured in clash with Afghan government forces in Kunduz city.

On 5 July, Abdul Hadi Nazari, an Afghan army spokesman said that around 15 Taliban fighters were killed in an Afghan Air Force airstrike targeting Taliban fighters gathering outside the city.

By mid-July, the Taliban were inside four out of nine municipal districts of Kunduz city, battling for control with the government forces. All the districts surrounding the city including the roads that lead outside the city were also under Taliban control. Lt. Col. Masound Nijrabi, commander of Afghan commandos, expressed contempt for the regular Afghan army soldiers who fail to hold territory and later the Afghan army commandos are forced to retake the territory from the Taliban forces.

On 23 July, Afghan police chief Zabardast Safi said that Afghan government forces had evicted Taliban fighters from villages around the city. Around ten Taliban fighters were killed and five others were injured during the operation.

On 7 August, Taliban forces had captured a large part of the city. The Taliban spokesman said that they had taken over the city. However, Afghan Interior Ministry spokesman, Mirwais Stanekzai, announced that a joint operation by Afghan National Security and Defense Forces (ANSDF) is underway with many areas of the city recaptured and many Taliban fighters killed or wounded.

By 8 August, Taliban had overrun most part of the city with government control reduced to a military base near the airport. Taliban assault on the city was also aided by reinforcements from neighbouring areas and Jowzjan province which fell to the Taliban forces on 7 August. After entering the city, the Taliban attacked the city prison, overpowered the prison guards and released hundreds of prisoners. Some of those freed prisoners were Taliban fighters and commanders who then aided the Taliban in launching attacks on the main government compounds in central Kunduz. Later that day, an airstrike was also carried out targeting local headquarters of National Directorate of Security which had fallen to the Taliban earlier. Afghanistan's Ministry of Defense also announced that operations to retake Kunduz were underway.

On 11 August, after resisting for three days, an entire 217th Pamir Corps surrendered, allowing Taliban to take control of the Pamir Corps headquarters and the airport. Taliban also captured a number of military vehicles, equipment, ScanEagle drones and one battle tank stationed inside the headquarters and also a Mil Mi-24 helicopter at the airport.

Zargul Alemi, a member of the Kunduz provincial council, said that there were around 2,000 soldiers in 217th Pamir Corps headquarters before surrender and desertions. Alemi said, "I don't know why the commanders did not gather their forces and fight until the last drop of their blood, with all the guns, resources and ammunition they had in the airport and the corps".

On 12 August, Ehsanullah Omarzad, Najibullah Omarkhel and Zabardast Safi had also surrendered to the Taliban.

== Key factors ==
Exhausted government forces, lack of reinforcements and delay in targeting of Taliban by Afghan Air Force, were described by Sayed Jawad Hussaini, the deputy police chief of a district in Kunduz city, as the key factors that benefited the Taliban and allowed them to capture the city.

Afghan politicians from Kunduz and Jawzjan provinces accused the Afghan government of not paying enough attention to the security situation in northern Afghanistan. Rabbani Rabbani, a member of Kunduz's provincial council, says that the Taliban knew the importance of Kunduz while the Afghan government saw it as a small village.

== Aftermath ==
Afghan army chief, Gen. Wali Ahmadzai, was sacked following the fall of the Kunduz city.

== See also ==
2021 Taliban offensive:

- Capture of Zaranj
- Fall of Herat
- Battle of Kandahar
- Battle of Lashkargah
- Fall of Kabul
