= Abdul Saboor Qani =

Afghan politician

Lieutenant General Abdul Saboor Qani
- عبدالصبور قانع،

Governor of Herat
- In office 15 June 2021 – 13 August 2021
- Preceded by: Wahid Qatali
- Succeeded by: vacant

Senior Deputy Minister of the Interior
- In office 18 January 2020 – 13 June 2021

Abdul Saboor Qani (Dari: عبدالصبور قانع،) is an Afghan politician and former governor of Herat Province. Appointed 15 June 2021, he was the governor during the 2021 Taliban offensive and surrendered to the Taliban on 13 August 2021 after the Fall of Herat. The day before, he said that Taliban attacks had been pushed back. Qani was previously the senior deputy minister for the Ministry of Interior Affairs for a year and a half.
