= Parsian =

Parsian may refer to:

- Parsian Bank, a bank in Iran
- Parsian, Iran, a city in Iran
- Parsian County, an administrative subdivision of Iran
- Parsian, Bandar Abbas, a village in Iran

== See also ==
- Parisian (disambiguation)
- Persian (disambiguation)
- Farsian (disambiguation)
- Parsi (disambiguation)
