= Farsian (disambiguation) =

Farsian, Farseyan, and Farsiyan (Persian: فارسيان) may refer to:

- Farsan, a city in Chaharmahal and Bakhtiari Province
- Farsian, Azadshahr, a village in Golestan Province
- Farsian, Galikash, a village in Golestan Province
- Farsian, Hamadan, a village in Hamadan Province
- Farzian, a village in Lorestan Province
- Farsian, Qazvin, a village in Qazvin Province

== See also ==
- Parsian (disambiguation)
- Farsi (disambiguation)
