= Afghanistan United Front =

Afghan military organization opposed to the Taliban

- Pashto: افغانستان متحده جبهه
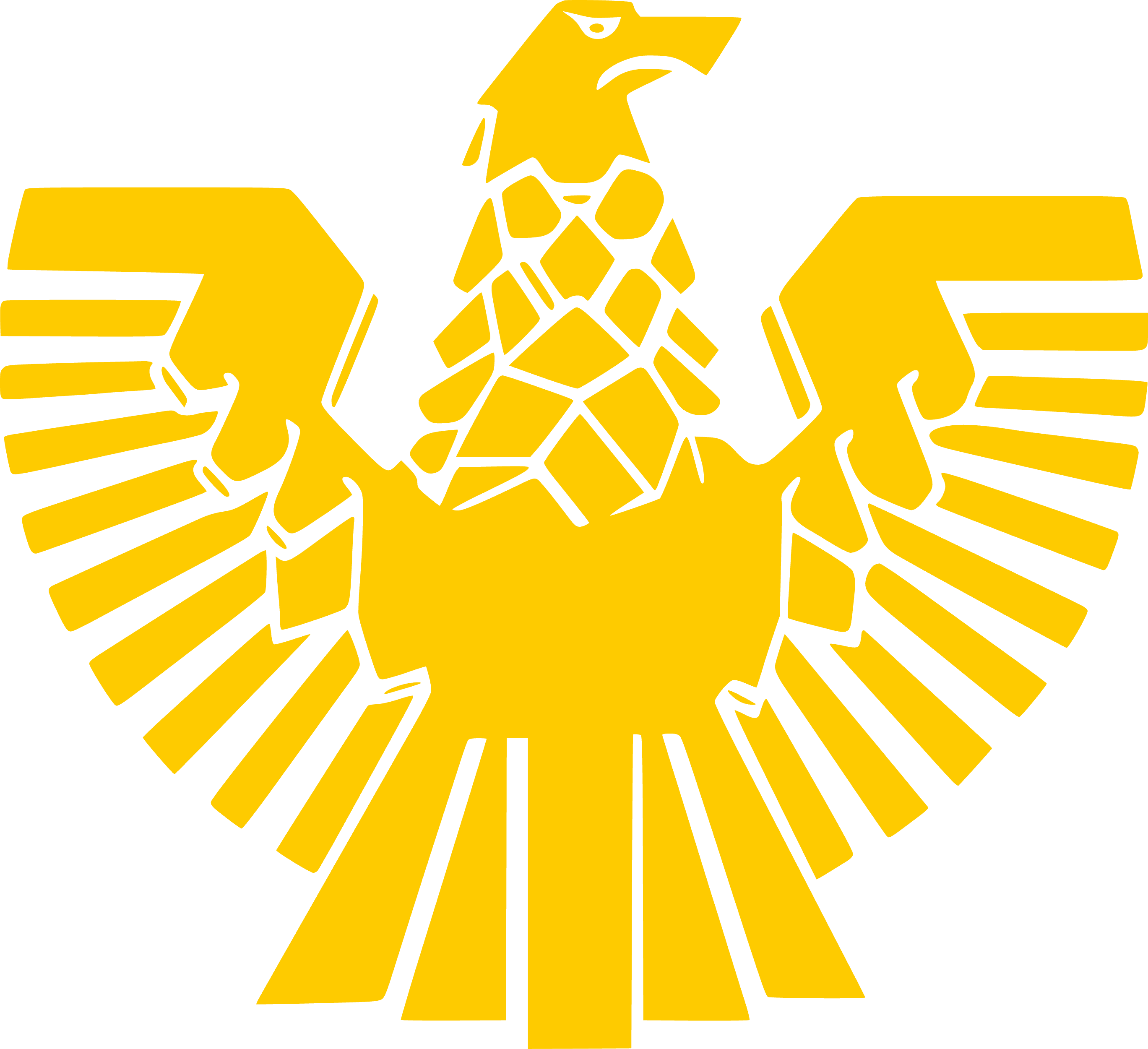
- Founder: Sami Sadat
- Founded: October 2023
- Active regions: Kandahar, Helmand, Uruzgan, Kabul, Khost, Nangarhar, Ghazni, Badghis, Ghor and Faryab
- Ideology: Republicanism; Constitutionalism; Anti-Taliban
- Status: Active
- Wars: Afghan conflict; Republican insurgency
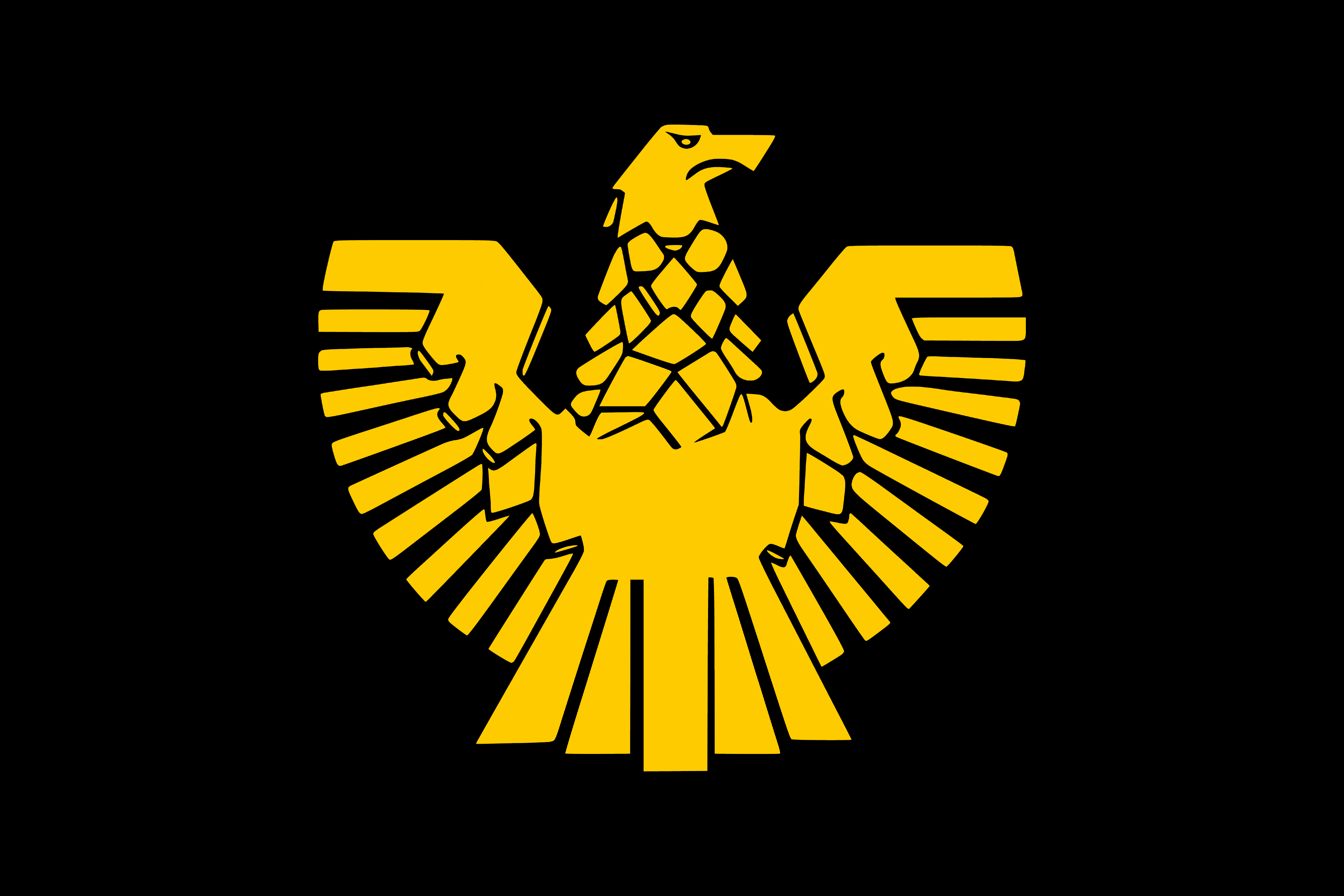
- Flag
- Website: afghanistanunitedfront.org

The Afghanistan United Front (AUF; Pashto: افغانستان متحده جبهه), sometimes known as the Afghan United Front, is an Afghan military organization fighting the Taliban in the republican insurgency in Afghanistan. The group was founded by former Afghan National Army (ANA) Lieutenant General Sami Sadat.

== History ==
=== Establishment ===
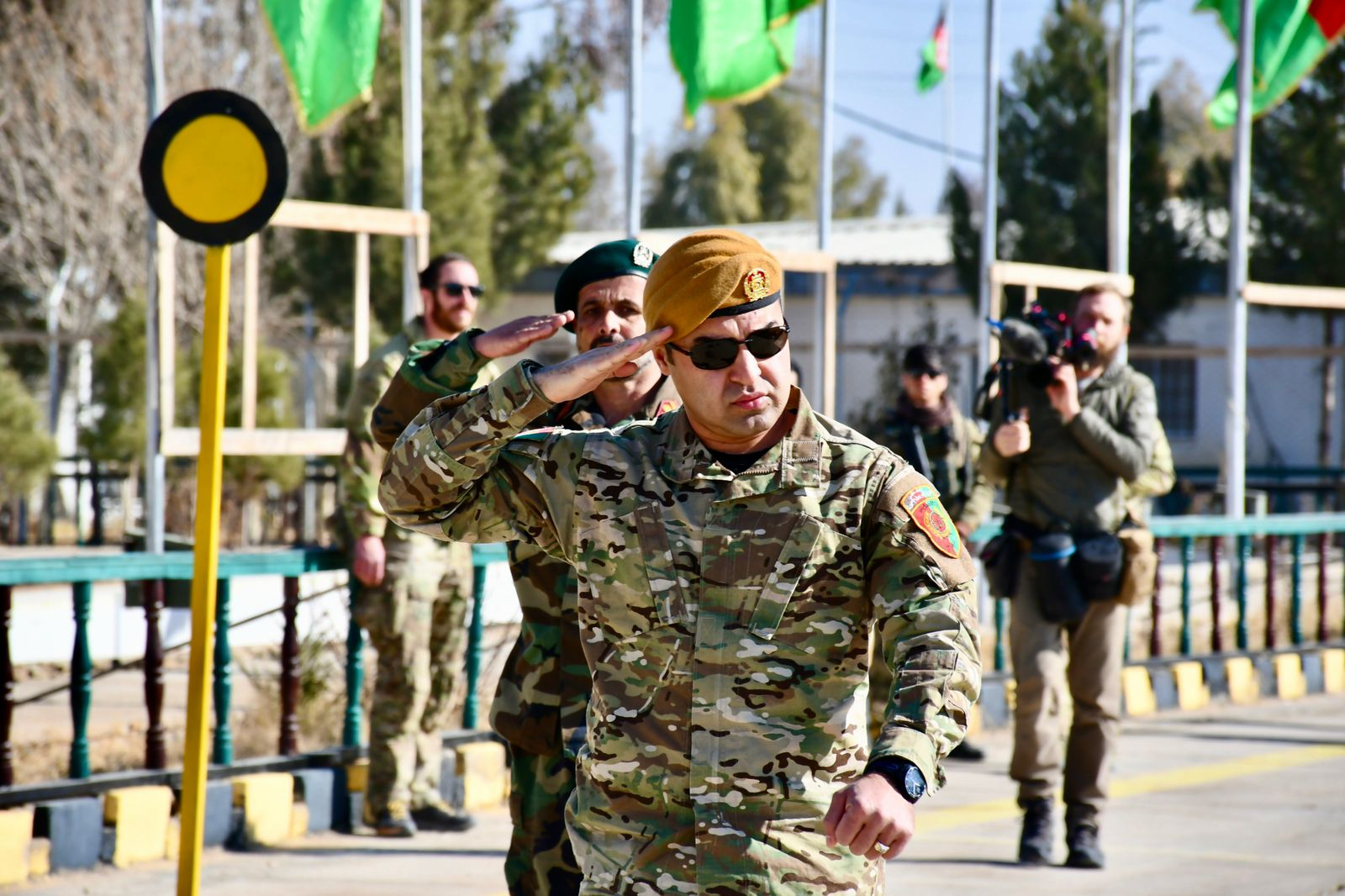
Sadat, the AUF's leader and founder.

The AUF was founded in October 2023 by Sami Sadat in the United States. Sadat, an ethnic Pashtun whose family is of sayyid lineage, previously served as a Lieutenant General in the ANA prior to the fall of the Republican government to Taliban forces in 2021. Following the Fall of Kabul, Sadat fled Afghanistan and went into exile in Europe and the US. Whilst in exile, he vowed to continue opposition to the Taliban in spite of its attempts to assassinate him. He initially attempted to join the National Resistance Front (NRF), but was blocked as the NRF feared a power struggle with Sadat who held opposing views. The AUF spent its time building advocacy networks in the US.

Initially, up until 2026, AUF avoided military confrontation with the Taliban government by dedicating itself to political resistance within Afghanistan and also abroad in other countries. When founding the AUF, Sadat stated he was committed to forming a legitimate Afghan government "through dialogue and participation of the Taliban in elections", but warned that the AUF would achieve its goals by force if necessary.

Sadat has stated that he views the AUF as the legitimate continuation of the ANA. The AUF is largely based around Mason Neck, Virginia where Sadat resides. The organisation is also largely self-funded by him.

=== Conflict against the Taliban ===
The AUF began its military campaign against the Taliban government in August 2026, around the fifth anniversary of the Taliban returning to power, under 'Operation Muharib'. On 1 August 2026, Sadat claimed the AUF's first attack in Kandahar which killed two Taliban fighters. A second attack occurred in Lashkar Gah, Helmand. On August 2, it claims to have killed in Badghis Province two Taliban members it claims were involved in torturing former Afghan security force personnel, and whilst carrying out an attack in Ghor Province in retaliation for the death of a woman who was a former Afghan National Police officer. On August 3, it claims an attack on a police centre in Kandahar that killed two Taliban guards in retaliation of torture. On August 4, it claims to have killed a member of the Taliban's intelligence centre in the Qaysar district of Faryab Province. On August 6, it claims two separate attacks again in Kandahar Province that killed Taliban intelligence officers in Spin Boldak and Kandahar City. On August 26, AUF fighters targeted a Taliban checkpoint at Daman district, Kandahar.

Sadat described the beginning of fighting against the Taliban as part of a national effort to restore order in Afghanistan according to the 2004 constitution. He said the beginning of the campaign would target Taliban soldiers, senior leaders and military bases. Sadat cited the failure of seeking a solution through politics and diplomacy as leaving armed resistance as the only option to restore a 'free' Afghanistan. Himself having ties overseas, Sadat said the AUF would seek political and material support from the international community, but that fighting would be achieved solely by Afghans.

Sadat stated the AUF's focus on Kandahar as deliberate in expanding resistance to the Taliban beyond their historic stronghold in the north and also inciting greater resistance among Pashtuns, whom most Taliban members are part of. Besides the Taliban, the AUF is opposed to Al-Qaeda, Islamic State and Tehreek-e-Taliban.

On August 28, the AUF reported a fatwa was issued by 180 scholars from across Afghanistan to conduct operations against the Taliban.

== Locations ==
While the AUF is mostly located in the US, its fighters are known to operate in Helmand and Kandahar.

== See also ==
- Republican insurgency in Afghanistan
