= Iranians =

Iranians, people of Iran, or Iranian people may refer to:

- Iranian peoples, a collection of ethno-linguistic groups identified by their native usage of any of the Iranian languages in Eastern Europe, West Asia, and Central/South Asia
  - Persians, an Iranian people comprising most of the population of the country of Iran
- Citizens and nationals of Iran
  - Ethnic groups in Iran (including Persians)
  - Iranian diaspora

== See also ==
- Iranian (disambiguation)
