= Pashtun Zarghun =

Poshte Zerghun پشتون زرغون
- Location in Afghanistan
- Coordinates: 34°17′0″N 62°37′0″E
- Country: Afghanistan
- Province: Herat
- District: Pashtun Zarghun
- Elevation: 1,042 m (3,419 ft)
- Time zone: UTC+4:30

Pashtun Zarghun (Persian: پشتون زرغون) is located at 1042 m altitude at the center of the Pashtun Zarghun District and is situated in its central part.

== See also ==
- Herat Province
