= Persian Sea =

Persian Sea may refer to:

- Arabian Sea, a sea in the northern Indian Ocean
- Persian Gulf, a gulf between the Arabian Peninsula and Iran
- Gulf of Oman, a gulf between the Arabian Sea and Persian Gulf
- Erythraean Sea, an obsolete term for waters in and near the Gulf of Aden

== See also ==
- Persian Gulf naming dispute, concern since the 1960s with the name of the body of water between the Arabian Peninsula and Iran
- Persian Gulf (disambiguation)
