= Farsi District =

Farsi
- District
- Location within Afghanistan
- Coordinates: 33°41′51″N 63°05′32″E
- Country: Afghanistan
- Province: Herat Province

Population (2012)
  - Total: 29,800

Farsi (Dari: ولسوالی فارسی) is a district the west of Herat Province, Afghanistan. It borders on Obe District to the north, Adraskan District to the west, Shindand District to the south and Ghor Province to the south and east. The population was estimated at 29,800 in 2012. The district center is the village of Farsi.

== Infrastructure ==
The district contains 130 km (81 mi) of unpaved roads with an access rate of 19.6% in all seasons.
