= Parsi, Bihar =

Parsi
- Village
- Location within Bihar
- Coordinates: 27.108°N 84.464°E
- Country: India
- State: Bihar
- District: West Champaran district

Languages
  - Official: Hindi
- Time zone: UTC+5:30 (IST)
- ISO 3166 code: IN-BR

Parsi is a village in West Champaran district in the Indian state of Bihar.

== Demographics ==
As of the 2011 census of India, Parsi had a population of 1954 in 324 households. Males constitute 53.9% of the population and females 46%. Parsi has an average literacy rate of 39.8%, lower than the national average of 74%: male literacy is 71.1%, and female literacy is 28.8%. In Parsi, 22.5% of the population is under 6 years of age.
