= Malan Bridge =

Bridge in Herat, Afghanistan

Malan Bridge د مالان پل پل مالان
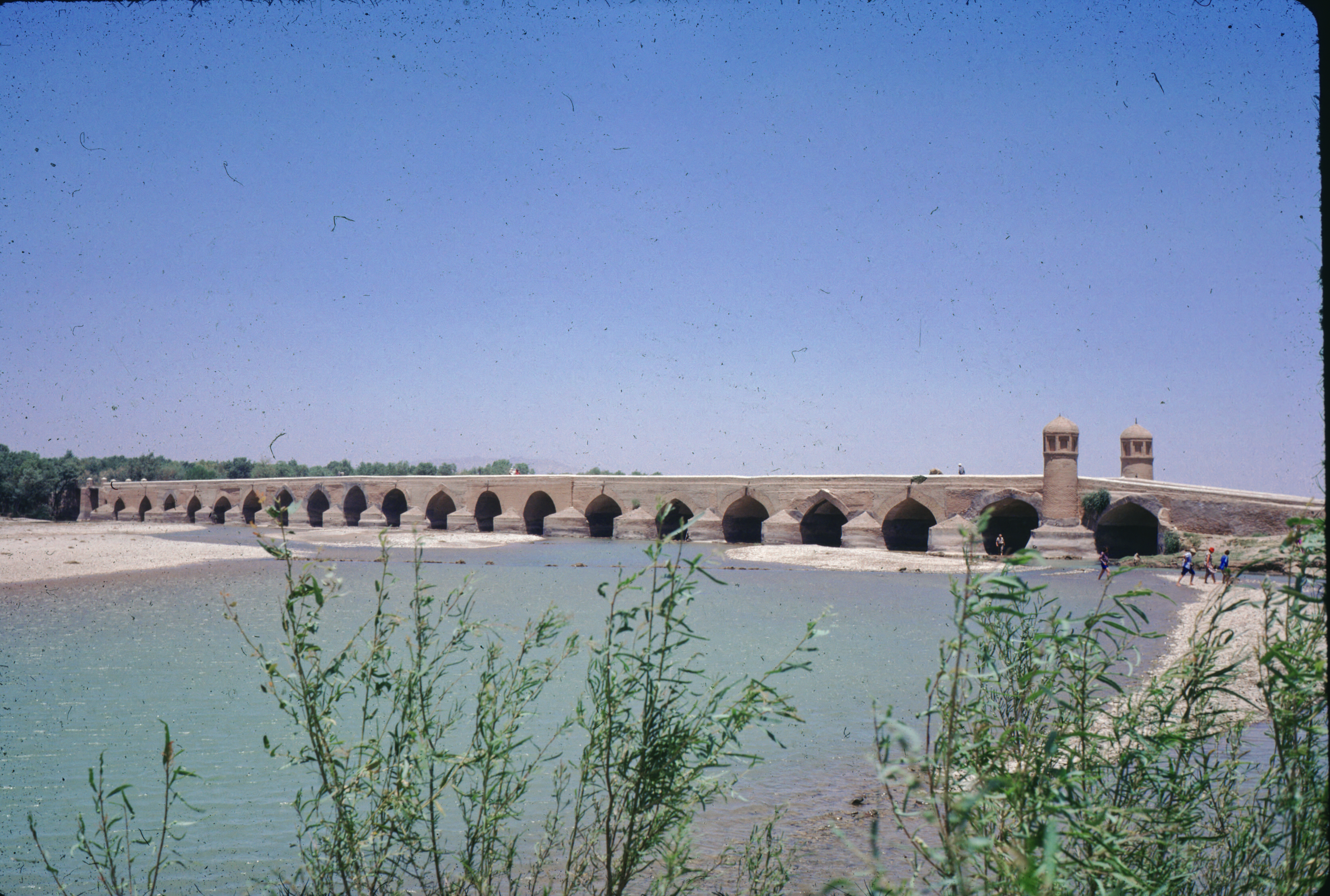
- Malan Bridge in 1975
- Coordinates: 34°17′10.4″N 62°11′28.8″E
- Crosses: Hari River
- Locale: Herat
- Other name(s): Da Malan Pal; Pul-i Malan
- Preceded by: Da Pushtu Pal; Pul-i Pushtu

Characteristics
- Design: Arch bridge
- Material: Concrete, baked bricks
- Total length: 230 m (750 ft)
- Width: 8 m (26 ft)
- Height: 10 m (33 ft)

History
- Opened: 1110–1112
- Rebuilt: 1995

Location
- Interactive map of Malan Bridge

Malan Bridge (Note: Pashto: د مالان پل Dari: پل مالان) is a two-lane arched bridge over the Hari River, connecting Injil District with Guzara District, both in the Herat Province of Afghanistan. It was built around 1110 AD. The bridge is located 12 km (7.5 mi) south of Herat's old city and downstream or west from the Pushtu Bridge. It currently consists of 22 arches and has survived several floods that have washed away other bridges across the Hari. It is 230 m (750 ft) long, 8 m (26 ft) wide, and 10 m (33 ft) high.

== History ==
The Malan Bridge at the outskirt of Herat, Afghanistan, 2025

A common legend about its creation says the mythical princesses Bibi Nur and Bibi Hur built the bridge around AD 900. They were followers of Zoroastrianism. The sisters had poultry, so they mixed eggshells with clay and, with much effort, constructed a bridge stronger than steel.

The bridge was built during the reign of Seljuk Sultan Ahmad Sanjar in 1110–1112 AD. The Mughal emperor Babur included it in his visit to the city in 1506. A tourist, Alexander Hamilton wrote that the bridge had 17 arches in the late 19th century; the bridge currently has 22. The bridge was also reported to be neglected and falling into decay in the late 19th century. By 1972, part of the bridge had been washed out and was impassable.

A modern bridge was built upstream in 1961–62 (SH 1340). Before that construction, the Malan Bridge was the only bridge connecting Herat and Kandahar and was considered important for that reason. The bridge was partially destroyed during the Soviet–Afghan War, with two guard towers crumbled and 5 arches demolished. The Danish Committee for Aid to Afghan Refugees rebuilt the bridge using concrete and baked bricks, strengthening the foundation and roadway in the process. The bridge reopened for crossing in 1995.
