= Jamila Saadat =

Afghan human rights activist

- جمیله سعادت
- Born: Jalalabad, Nangarhar Province, Afghanistan
- Education: Women's rights activist

Jamila Saadat (Dari: جمیله سعادت) is an Afghan human rights activist. She is known for her advocacy for the rights of women and girls living in Nangarhar Province.

== Activism ==
In 2006, after graduating with a degree in disaster management, Saadat began working for the newly established Independent Election Commission's office in Jalalabad, the capital of Nangarhar Province and the fifth-largest city in Afghanistan. She was a member of the commission's female voter registration team; by the time elections were held in 2010, Saadat and her team had successfully registered hundreds of women in Jalalabad to vote.

Also in 2006, Saadat established the Handicraft and Carpet Weaving Institute, in which she taught women various crafts and skills linked to the textiles industry, one of the employment opportunities more readily available and acceptable for women due to the ability to segregate workers by genders. Saadat stated her intent to use textiles and textile art to "rebel" against gender oppression and to support women's access to education and work, as well as their participation in civil society. Through the institute, Saadat also completed outreach work, including challenging cultural beliefs that prohibited women from studying or working by meeting with families. Saadat went on to establish other humanitarian organisations, including the Vocational Training and Carpet Weaving Company and the Nangarhar Women Business Association, which offered support and training to homeless and displaced women in Bagh-e-Zanana.

In 2012, Saadat was named as one of two female members of the Provincial Peace Council for Nangarhar Province, alongside Zarghuna Zewar, which contributed to the Afghan peace process. In 2015, she was among the signatories of a six-point proposal to ensure the participation of women in the peace process, signed by the female members of the country's 34 Provincial Peace Councils.

As of 2024, Saadat was living in exile following the Taliban takeover of Afghanistan.
