= Arab's Gulf =

Coordinates: 30°55′N 29°05′E

Upper: The World-Wide Atlas (1897). Lower: Harmsworth's New Atlas of the World (circa 1922)

The Arab's Gulf, also known as the Arab Gulf or Arab Bay (all translating the Arabic name Khalij el-Arab, خليج العرب), is a large bay to the west of Alexandria in Egypt. It is not to be confused with the "Arabian Gulf" (a historic name for the Red Sea) or the Arabian Sea.

It contains the southernmost point of the Levantine Sea, which lies about 92 km west-southwest of the center of Alexandria.

Geologically, the Gulf is the result of the Arab Gulf Synclinal Basin, one of a succession of synclines along the northern coast of Africa.

Just west of the apex of the Gulf is a community, developed as an oil port but now a resort, which had little significance before the Second World War: El Alamein, site of the famous 1942 battles.
