= Obe, Afghanistan =

Obe اوبه
- Location in Afghanistan
- Coordinates: 34°22′11″N 63°10′35″E
- Country: Afghanistan
- Province: Herat
- District: Obe
- Elevation: 1,277 m (4,190 ft)
- Time zone: UTC+4:30

Obe (Persian: اوبه) is a town and the administrative center of Obe District, Herat Province, Afghanistan. It is located at 34.3697°N 63.1764°E at 1277 m altitude in the valley of the Hari River, northeast of Herat.

== Climate ==
Obe features a hot-summer humid continental climate (Köppen climate classification: Dsa). Precipitation is low, and mostly falls in spring and winter. The average annual temperature is 10.5 °C (50.9 °F).

Climate data for Obe, Herat Province
| Month | Jan | Feb | Mar | Apr | May | Jun | Jul | Aug | Sep | Oct | Nov | Dec | Year |
|---|---|---|---|---|---|---|---|---|---|---|---|---|---|
| Daily mean °C (°F) | −2 (28) | −0.3 (31.5) | 5.0 (41.0) | 10.5 (50.9) | 15.8 (60.4) | 21.2 (70.2) | 23.4 (74.1) | 21.8 (71.2) | 16.5 (61.7) | 10.4 (50.7) | 4.0 (39.2) | 0.2 (32.4) | 10.5 (50.9) |
| Average precipitation mm (inches) | 50.1 (1.97) | 54.1 (2.13) | 69.3 (2.73) | 41.4 (1.63) | 15.7 (0.62) | 0.0 (0.0) | 0.0 (0.0) | 0.0 (0.0) | 0.0 (0.0) | 5.5 (0.22) | 17.5 (0.69) | 34.6 (1.36) | 288.2 (11.35) |
| Average relative humidity (%) | 61 | 68 | 56 | 47 | 37 | 24 | 21 | 22 | 23 | 33 | 48 | 50 | 41 |
Source 1: ClimateCharts(1988-2017)
Source 2: World Weather Online (humidity)

== See also ==
- Herat Province
