= Dinshah Irani =

Indian lawyer

Sir Dinshah Jijibhoy Irani (also transliterated as Dinshaw Jijiboy Irani, and commonly known as D.J. Irani) (4 November 1881 – 3 November 1938) was an Indian lawyer and distinguished benefactor of the Zoroastrian communities of both India and Iran.

== Biography ==
Dinshah was born on 4 November 1881 in Mumbai. His family moved from Iran to India as part of a wave of migration that began during the 18th century. His paternal grandfather, Bomes, left Yazd with his son Jijibhoy to settle in India in the mid-nineteenth century. His mother, Piroja Bānu, was allegedly the granddaughter of Golestān Bānu, one of the original Iranian Zoroastrian migrants of the late 18th century. He was distantly related to Keikhosrow Shahrokh. In 1901, he received a bachelor's degree in English and Persian literature at the University of Mumbai's Elphinstone College. The following year, he was appointed as a teaching fellow in Persian at St. Xavier's College in Mumbai; however, soon he abandoned his academic career. In 1904, he obtained a Bachelor of Laws and embarked on a legal career.

Dinshah (also transliterated as Dinshaw) Irani is most famous for founding the 'Iranian Zoroastrian Anjuman' in 1918 and of the 'Iran League' in 1922. Both organizations, like the earlier 'Persian Zoroastrian Amelioration Fund' established in 1854 by Dinshaw Maneckji Petit, were founded with the aim of improving the conditions for the less fortunate Zoroastrian co-religionists in Iran. Dinshah's efforts to improve the conditions for that community were recognized in 1932 when he – along with fellow Indian Rabindranath Tagore – was invited to Iran as a special guest of the then Shahanshah Reza Shah Pahlavi. Irani was also an academic and published numerous works including a translation of the Gathas.

He was the father of Indian-American philosopher and academic Kaikhosrov D. Irani who was very active in the Zoroastrian community in New York City.
