= Persian invasion =

Persian invasion may refer to:

- Persian invasion of Scythia, 513 BC
- Greco-Persian Wars
  - First Persian invasion of Greece, 492–490 BC
  - Second Persian invasion of Greece, 480–479 BC
- Persian Invasion of Daghestan, 1741–1743 AD
