= Keikhosrow Shahrokh =

Iranian politician (1864–1939)

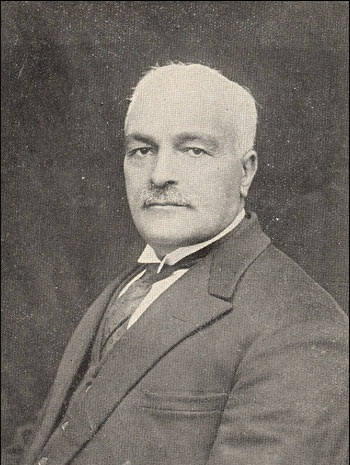
Keikhosrow Shahrokh

Keikhosrow Shahrokh (Persian: کیخسرو شاهرخ) (1864 in Kerman, Sublime State of Persia – 1939) was the mastermind and designer of the mausoleum for Persian poet Ferdowsi at his burial site in the city of Tus. He is often credited with sparking the Persian nationalist movement which took place under the Pahlavi dynasty. Shahrokh helped reinstate Aryan pride in Iran through excavations of ancient relics near the Iranian city of Kerman. During his tenure in Iran's Revival Party he bolstered Iranian nationalism with numerous speeches and rallies across Shiraz, Kerman, and Tehran. As elected representative of the Zoroastrian community, he was an active member of the Iranian parliament. He is best known for his role in the 1925 transition of the official calendar from the Islamic calendar of Hejri Ghamarei to the Iranian civil calendar, also known as Hejri shamsi.

Shahrokh often credited his pride of Persian descent to his hometown of Kerman which avoided miscegenation over thousands of years due to natural barriers such as the Lut desert and nearby mountains. Shahrokh was distantly related to Dinshah Irani, the Indian lawyer and benefactor of the Zoroastrian communities of both India and Iran. Shahrokh and Irani shared a late 18th-century ancestor, most of whose children migrated to India, and from which Dinshah Irani's family descended. Shahrokh was a scion of another branch, descending from the elder son - who had remained in Iran - of that ancestor.

== See also ==
- Qajar dynasty
- Iranian calendar
- Zoroastrians in Iran
