= Parisian =

Parisian may refer to:

- a native or inhabitant of Paris
- Standard French, based on the dialect of Paris
- Parisian (department store chain), a department store chain bought by Belk, based in Birmingham, Alabama
- The Parisian Macao, a casino resort on the Cotai Strip, Macau
- Parisian stitch, an embroidery stitch
- Josh Parisian (born 1989), American mixed martial artist
- Pontiac Parisienne, a full-size rear-wheel drive vehicle
- a font designed by Morris Fuller Benton in 1928
- SS Parisian, a steamship in the Allan Line

== See also ==
- Parsian (disambiguation)
- Paris (disambiguation)
