= Farsi, Afghanistan =

Farsi
- Location in Afghanistan
- Coordinates: 33°47′5″N 62°7′10″E
- Country: Afghanistan
- Province: Herat Province
- Elevation: 7,467 ft (2,276 m)
- Time zone: UTC+4:30

Farsi (Qal'a Farsi) is a village and the center of Farsi District in Herat Province, Afghanistan.

== See also ==
- Herat Province
