= Kaikhosrov D. Irani =

Philosopher specializing in Kant and philosophy of science

Kaikhosrov D. Irani (May 1, 1922 – June 29, 2017) was a philosopher specializing in Kant and the philosophy of science. Born in Bombay, India, he was the eldest son of Sir Dinshah Irani and Banu Mithibai Sethna. He studied at Princeton University and was a student of Albert Einstein. He taught for 41 years in the philosophy department at City College of New York, where he served as Chairman for nine years. He was a member of the Academy of Science in New York, the American Philosophical Association, the Philosophy of Science Association, and the American Academy of Religion. He was a judge for the Templeton Prize given to individuals for "affirming life's spiritual dimension." He was active in New York's Zoroastrian community.

== Publications ==
- Social Justice in the Ancient World (Greenwood Press, 1995)
- Rationality in Thought and Action (Greenwood Press, 1986)
- Emotion: Philosophical Studies (Haven Pub. Corp., 1983)
- Pathology and Consciousness (Haven Pub. Corp., 1978)
