= Pashtun Zarghun District =

Pashtun Zarghun District ولسوالی پشتون زرغون
- Location in Afghanistan
- Coordinates: 34°17′0″N 62°37′0″E
- Country: Afghanistan
- Province: Herat

Population (2008)
  - Total: 90,817
- Time zone: UTC+4:30

Pashtun Zarghun District (Persian: ولسوالی پشتون‌ زرغون), formerly known as Posht-e Zirghān or Posht-e Zirghūn (Persian: پشت زرغون), is situated in the central part of Herat Province, Afghanistan in the valley of the Hari River. The district center is Pashtun Zarghun.

== Geography ==
Pashtun Zarghun District borders Karukh District to the North, Obe District to the east, Adraskan District to the south and Guzara District to the west.

== Population ==
The estimated population of Khoshi District in 2008 was roughly 90,817. According to the official census, Pashtuns constitute the absolute majority of the population of this district, and most of them have lost their language and speak Dari.

== Education ==
In 2008, there were around 4 high schools and 20 secondary schools in the district.
