= Zerkoh Valley =

Valley in Afghanistan

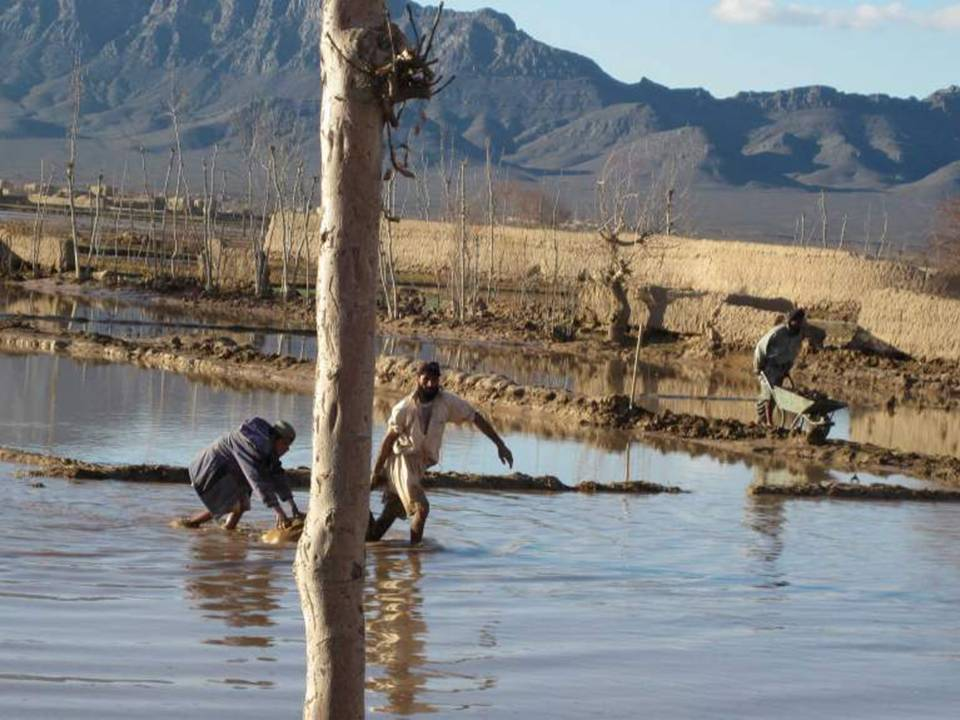
Zerkoh Valley during early 2011 flooding

Zerkoh Valley (alternately Zirko, Zer-e-koh, Zir Koh) runs for 30 miles through Shindand District, Herat Province, Afghanistan.

== Civilian deaths in Coalition airstrikes ==
On 29 April 2007, a number of Afghan civilians in Zerkoh were killed in airstrikes conducted in support of US Special Operations Forces. Estimates of the number of dead vary, with the Afghan government claiming 42 killed, with no sign of Taliban forces. Initial Coalition media reports stated that 87 Taliban were killed with no reports of civilian casualties. Human Rights Watch reported the civilian dead as at least 25.
