= Sami Sadat =

Afghan army general (born 1985)

Sayed Sami Sadat دگرجنرال سیدسمیع سادات
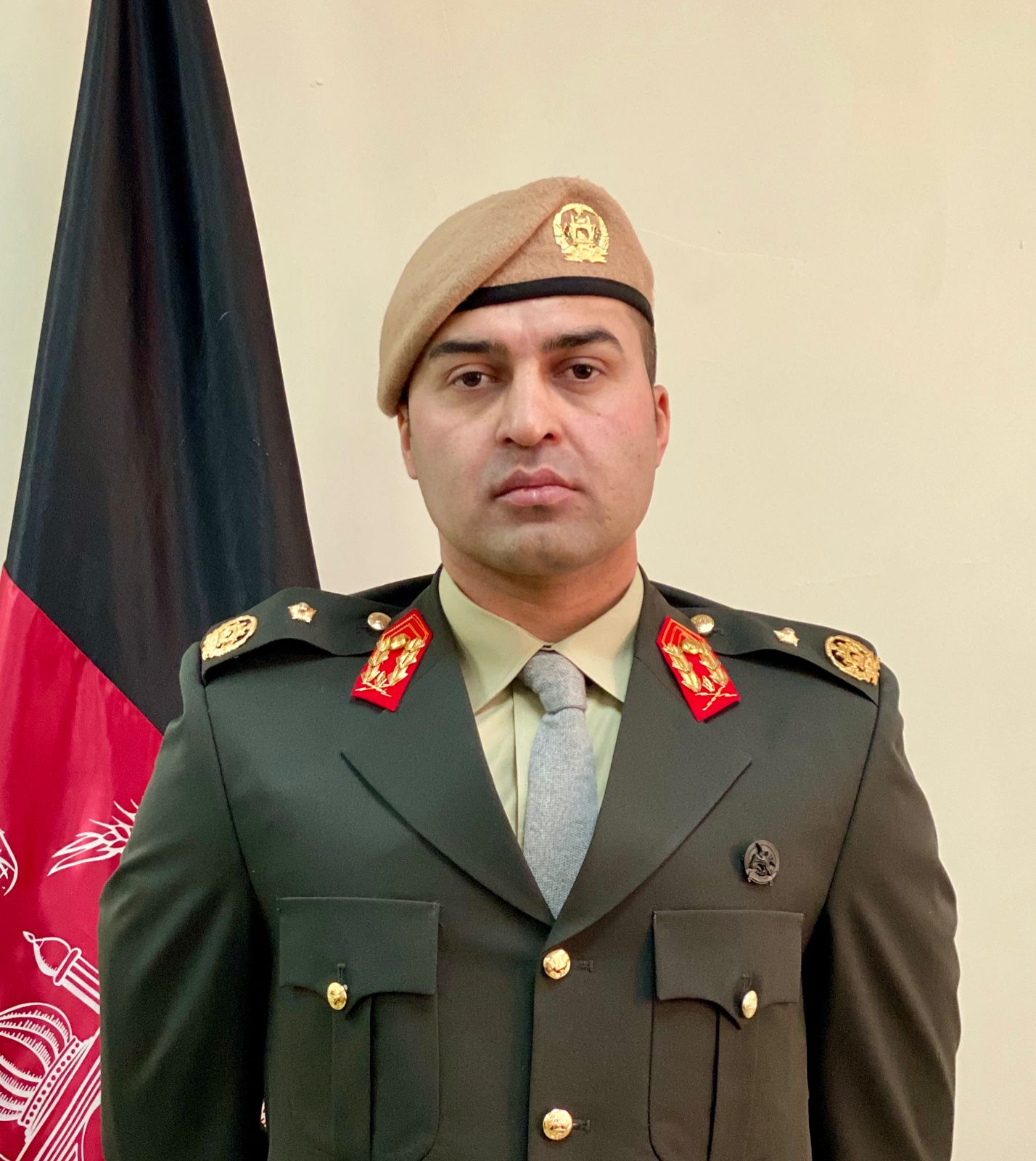
- Sami Sadat in 2019 During his mission as an intelligence advisor to the Minister of Defense of Afghanistan

Deputy Chief of the Afghan Army
- In office 13 July 2021 – 15 August 2021
- President: Hamid Karzai; Ashraf Ghani

Personal details
- Born: Sayed Sami Sadat; 17 March 1985 (age 41) Kabul, Afghanistan
- Relations: Hikmat Sadat (brother); Khtera Sadat (sister)

Military service
- Allegiance: Islamic Republic of Afghanistan; Afghan United Front (2023–present)
- Branch/service: Afghan National Army (2007–2021)
- Years of service: 2007–2021 (Afghan National Army); 2023–present (Afghan United Front)
- Rank: Lieutenant General
- Commands: Deputy Director of Public Relations of the Ministry of Interior.; Deputy of the 40th Director General (Directorate of National Security); Head of Covert Action 76 Department at (NDS); Military Advisor to the Minister of National Defense; The Commander of the Afghan government's joint special operations unit against terrorism (JSOC); The Commander of 215th 'Maiwand' Army Corps; Special Operations Corps Commander; Afghan United Front
- Battles/wars: War in Afghanistan; Republican insurgency in Afghanistan

Sayed Sami Sadat (Note: Pashto: سیدسمیع سادات) (born 17 March 1985) is an Afghan military officer who served as Deputy Chief of the Afghan Army in 2021. He is the leader of the Afghan United Front (AUF), an armed group conducting an insurgency against Taliban rule in Afghanistan.

== Early life and public service ==
Sadat was born on born 17 March 1985 in the Khair Khāna neighbourhood of Kabul in the Democratic Republic of Afghanistan. He belongs to the Pashtun ethnic group and his family has Arab roots. He finished school in Kabul and graduated from the Joint Services Command and Staff College at the Defence Academy in the class of 2011 (ACSC 14). He then attended the Polish Defence Academy, where he completed the Battalion Command Course, and the NATO Military Academy in Munich, Germany. He also holds an Master's degree in Strategic Management and Leadership from the Chartered Management Institute.

Sadat began government service in the Ministry of the Interior. He was a Deputy Director for Strategic Commuinications and Policy Advisor.

Sadat also served as a senior director in the NDS. He Served as Director of covert action program from 2013 to 2015.

=== Military career ===
Sadat was in command of a counter-terrorism unit known as CTU until 2018, his team was in charge of operations against Al-Qaeda in Afghanistan and Pakistan.

Sadat has been responsible for the Afghan Army more effectively from 2017 to 2021 in various parts of the country. He led the Afghan National Army's special forces unit and Kabul garrison during the Fall of Kabul in 2021.

=== Afghanistan United Front ===
Since October 2023, Sadat has led the Afghanistan United Front.

In August 2026, Sadat released a video appealing for support from the US and NATO, claiming his group was fighting the Taliban government, Al Qaeda, the Islamic State, and Tehrik-e-Taliban Pakistan in Kandahar province.

== Commands held ==
- The commander of (JSOC) the Afghanistan Government's Joint special operations unit against terrorism. (2019-2020)
- Corps Commander of 215th 'Maiwand' Afghanistan (2020-2021)
- Corps Commander ANDSF Corps (Afghanistan) (May 2021-Aug 2021)
- Garrison Commander and In-Charge Kabul Security (May 2021-Aug 2021)
- Afghan United Front (2023-Present)

== Publications ==
Sadat has published a memoir entitled The Last Commander.
