= Iranian =

Iranian (Persian: ایرانی) may refer to:

- Something of, from, or related to Iran
  - Iranian diaspora, Iranians living outside Iran
  - Iranian architecture, architecture of Iran and parts of the rest of West Asia
  - Iranian cuisine, cooking traditions and practices

== Other uses ==
- Iranian peoples, the speakers of the Iranian languages. The term Iranic peoples is also used for this term to distinguish the pan-ethnic term from Iranian, used for the people of Iran
- Iranian languages, a branch of the Indo-Iranian languages
- Iranian.com, also known as The Iranian and The Iranian Times

== See also ==
- Persian (disambiguation)
- Iranians (disambiguation)
- Languages of Iran
- Ethnicities in Iran
- Demographics of Iran
- Indo-Iranian languages
- Irani (disambiguation)
- List of Iranians
