= Persian Gulf (disambiguation) =

Persian Gulf is a mediterranean sea in Western Asia.

Persian Gulf may also refer to:

- Iranian destroyer Persian Gulf, a warship
- Persian Gulf University, Bushehr Province, Iran
- Persian Gulf (missile), an Iranian anti-ship munition
- Persian Gulf forever, song by Ebi
- Persian Gulf (horse) (1940–1964), a British thoroughbred racehorse

== See also ==
- Persian Gulf War (disambiguation)
- Persian Gulf naming dispute
- Arabian Gulf (disambiguation)
