= Adraskan District =

Adraskan ادرسکن
- District
- Location within Afghanistan
- Coordinates: 33°47′24″N 61°49′30″E
- Country: Afghanistan
- Province: Herat

Area
  - Total: 10,070 km^{2} (3,890 sq mi)

Population (2012)
  - Total: 52,200

Adraskan (Pashto: ادرسکن) is a district in the central part of Herat Province in Afghanistan. It is bordered to the west by Iran, to the north by Ghoryan District, Zinda Jan District, Guzara District, Pashtun Zarghun District and Obe District, to the east by Farsi District and to the south by Shindand District.

The population was estimated at 52,200 in 2012. The district is large; the eastern part is much more populated than the west. The Harut River (also known as the Adraskan River) flows from east to south through Adraskan. The main road from Herat to Kandahar passes in a north–south direction through the district center, the ancient town of Adraskan.

Its population are predominantly Pashtuns.

== See also ==
- Districts of Afghanistan
