= Obe District =

Obe اوبه
- District
- Location within Afghanistan
- Coordinates: 34°22′24″N 63°11′43″E
- Country: Afghanistan
- Province: Herat

Population (2012)
  - Total: 73,600

Obe District (Persian: ولسوالی اوبه) is a district in the northeast of Herat Province, Afghanistan. It borders on the north with Badghis Province, on the east with Chishti sharif District, on the southeast with Farsi District, on the south with Adraskan District, and on the west with Pashtun Zarghun and Karukh districts.

The population of the district was estimated at 73,600 in 2012. The district center is the town of Obe (Owbi). The Hari River flows through the district.

== Agriculture ==
The following table demonstrates the total amount of irrigated and rain-fed lands in the district.

Total (Jerib)	Irrigated (Jerib)	Rainfed (Jerib)	Forest (Hectare)
79,879	77,799	151,981	81,550
