= Battle of Kunduz (2016) =

Afghan/Taliban battle

- Part of the War in Afghanistan (2001–2021)
Date	3–12 October 2016 (1 week and 2 days)
Location	Kunduz, Kunduz Province, Afghanistan 36.728611°N 68.868056°E
Result	Afghan victory

Belligerents
Islamic Republic of Afghanistan; Supported by: RS: United States	Taliban

Commanders and leaders
(Afghanistan) Gen. Kassim Jangal Bagh (Kunduz provincial police chief)	Abdul Salam Baryali

Strength
(Afghanistan) 100 special forces (Afghanistan) 1,000 soldiers Unknown number of police forces	Unknown

Casualties and losses
40+ killed unknown wounded	90+ killed and dozens injured
- 200 civilian casualties 24,000 people displaced
- Kunduz within Afghanistan

The Battle of Kunduz occurred on 3 October 2016 in the Afghan city of Kunduz between Afghan National Security Forces and Taliban insurgents. It occurred exactly a year after the 2015 battle when the Taliban briefly controlled the city.

== Battle ==
According to the Taliban, a four pronged attack was launched on Kunduz on the morning of 3 October 2016. They later claimed to have seized several checkpoints and the city's roundabout. Afghanistan special forces were flown in from Kabul to assist in securing the city. By the evening the local police chief, Kassim Jangal Bagh, told the press that the city center was in government hands, a statement later backed by the NATO–led Resolute Support Mission. He also said that a full counteroffensive had been launched to clear the area. It was reported that fighting persisted near the governor's compound, the local police headquarters, and the local National Directorate of Security headquarters. The Ministry of the Interior stated that at least one police officer was killed and four more were wounded. A member of parliament who represented the area say that Taliban had overrun parts of the city and taken control of the city center.

On 4 October, Afghan forces managed to regain control of the city center.

On 12 October, Afghan security forces cleared Kunduz of Taliban fighters after more than a week of fighting.

== Casualties ==
According to the Kunduz provincial health director, at least 151 were wounded and one was killed.

== See also ==
- Taliban insurgency
