= Shindand District =

Shindand شينډنډ
- District
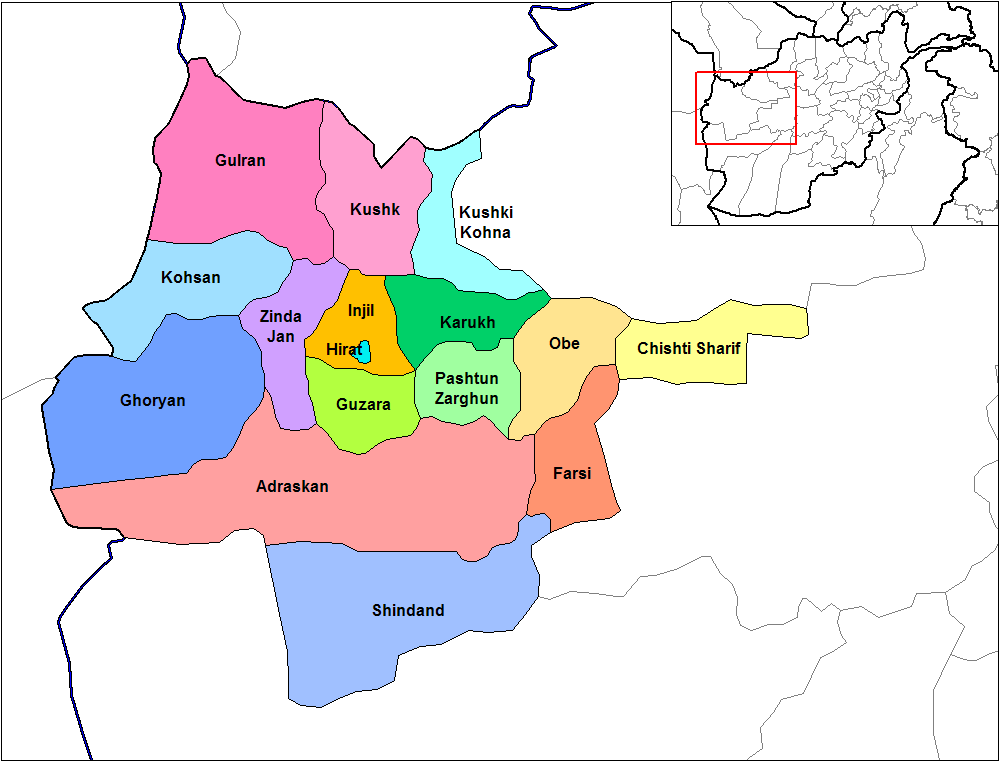
- Shindand District (in south) on Herat province map

- Location within Afghanistan
- Coordinates: 33.3036°N 62.1400°E
- Country: Afghanistan
- Province: Herat Province
- Capital: Shindand

Population (2021)
  - Total: 49,024
- Time zone: UTC+4:30

Shinḍanḍ District (Pashto: شينډنډ) is located in the southern part of Herat Province in Afghanistan, bordering Adraskan District to the north, Ghor Province to the east and Farah Province to the south and west. It is one of the 16 districts of Herat Province. The name Shindand is Pashto and relates to lush green farming area.

The population of Shindand District is around 49,024. The district center is the town of Shindand, which has an active market area. Shindand Air Base is located near the town. The Kandahar–Herat Highway passes through the district. The Zerkoh Valley is in the district.

== History ==
The name 'Shindand' comes from the Pashto language terms 'Shin' (blue) and 'Dand' (river). Amalgamated, it would come to literally mean 'Blue River'. The ancient name of Shindand is believed to be Esfezar. Notable historical sites in Shindand include Qala-Dokhtar and Qala Rustam-Zal.

== Divisions ==
Shindand District is divided into five bigger districts, namely Zawol, Zerkoh, Poshteh-Koh, Kooh-Zoor and Qasaba. Shindand District is one of the most diverse and wide districts in Afghanistan, representing thirty different Afghan tribes which include both Pashtun sub-tribes. Ismail Khan, the country's former Minister of Energy and Water,

== Demography ==
The estimated population of Shindand District was 49,024 (as of April 2021). Another source has put at 173,800 (2011). In terms of tribal and ethnic groups, Shindand is one of the most diverse districts in Herat Province. Around 60 percent of the population is Pashtun and 40 percent Tajik, Aimaq Hazara, Baloch and others. However, sixty percent of Tajiks live within the town of Shindand, which includes Qasaba and surrounding districts. The main languages spoken in the district are Pashto and Dari.

== Climate ==
Shindand is sunny and windy all year long. Though the winds pick up during the months of May through September, called Badayeh-Sado-Bist Roozeh (120 Day Winds). The rainy season is from November/December to March/April, though the rains are scattered.
