= Spring green =

Color

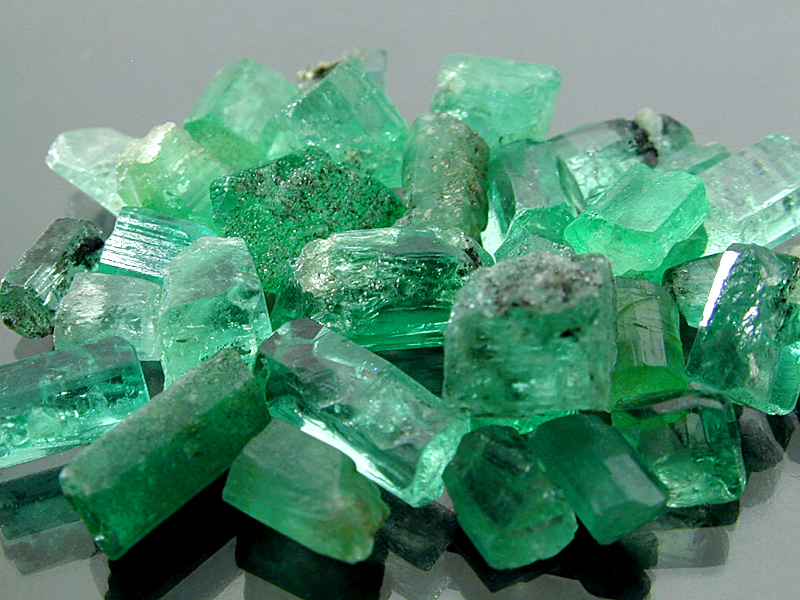
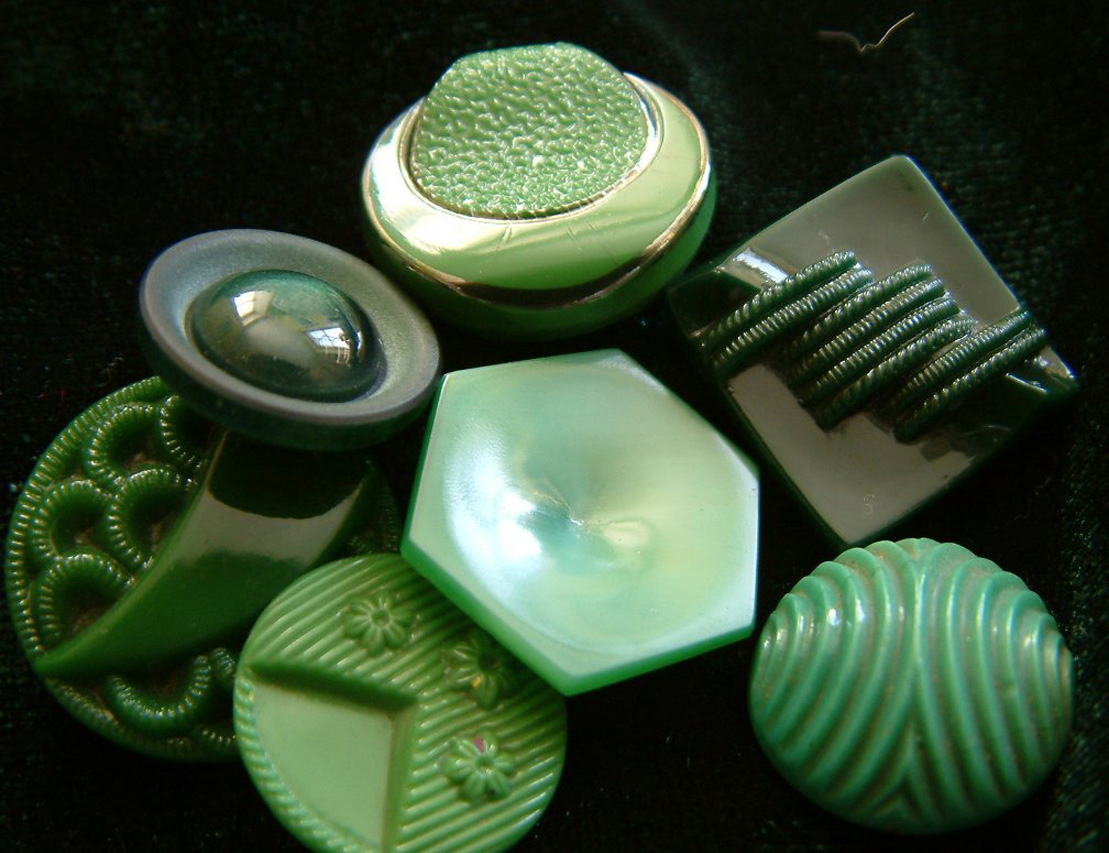
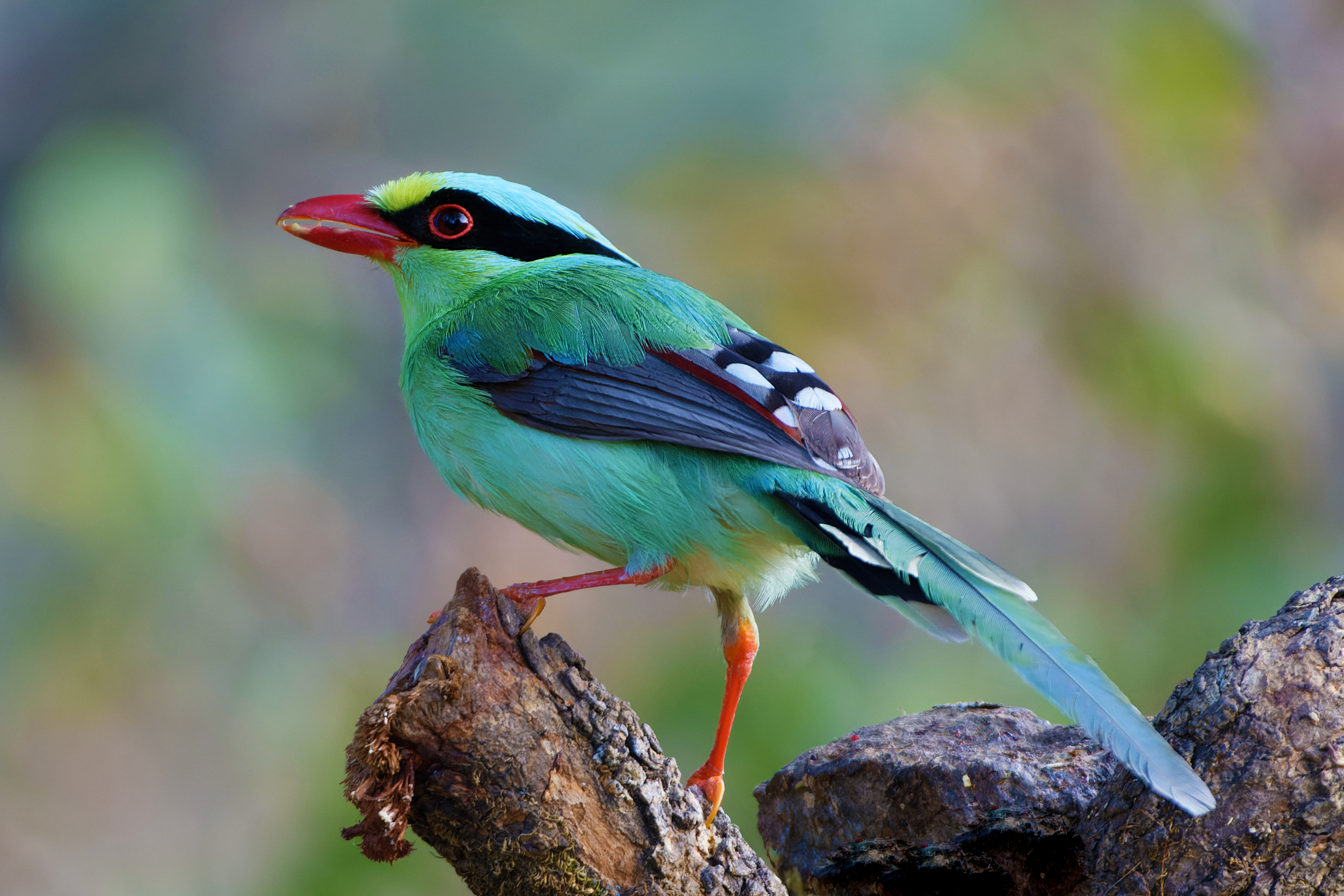
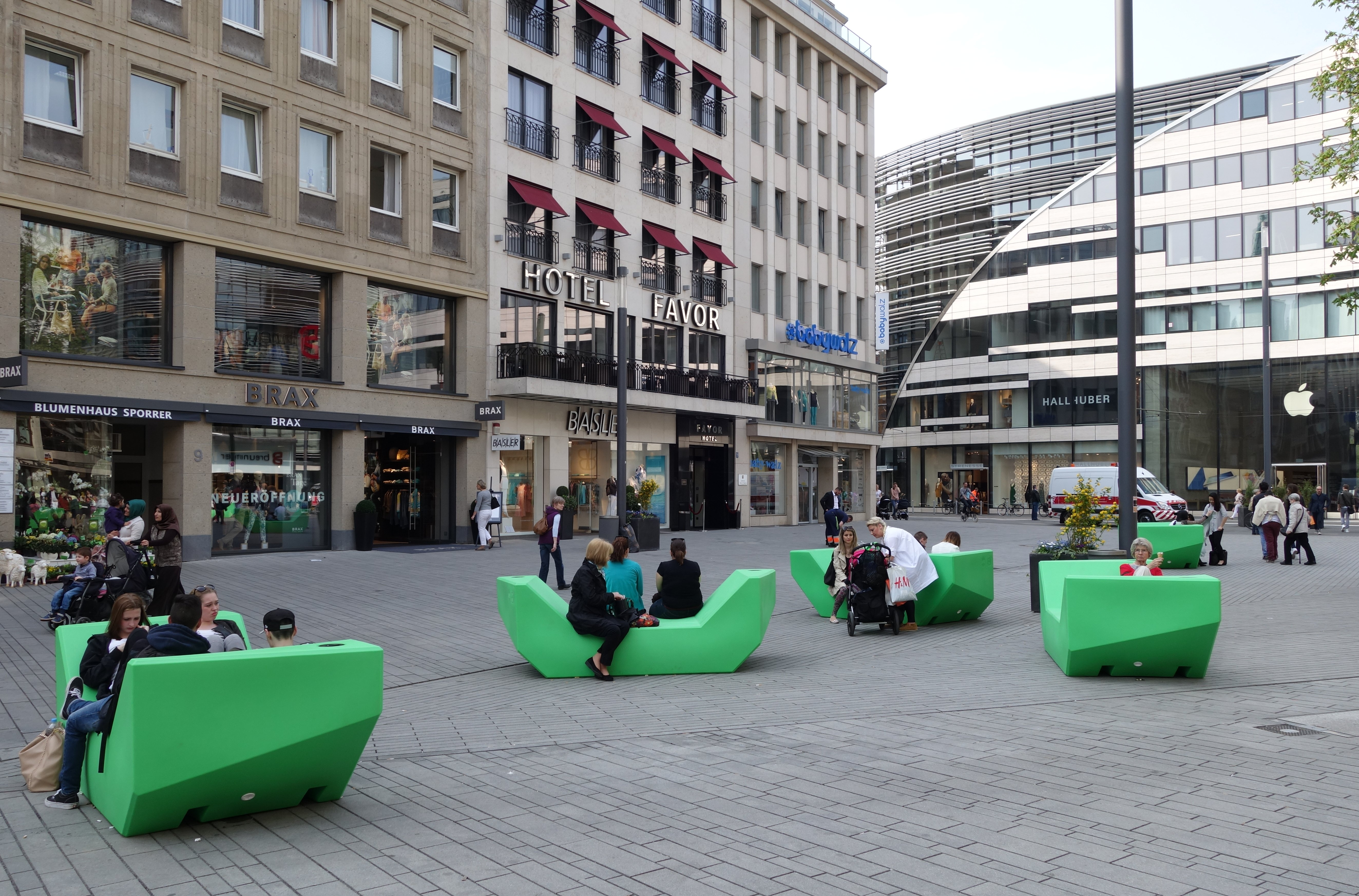
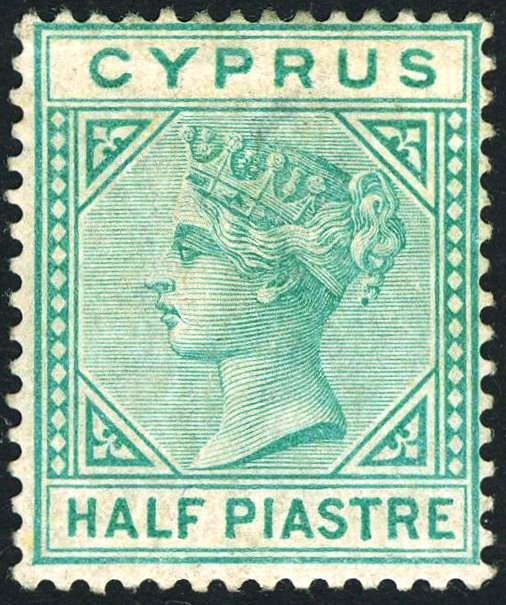
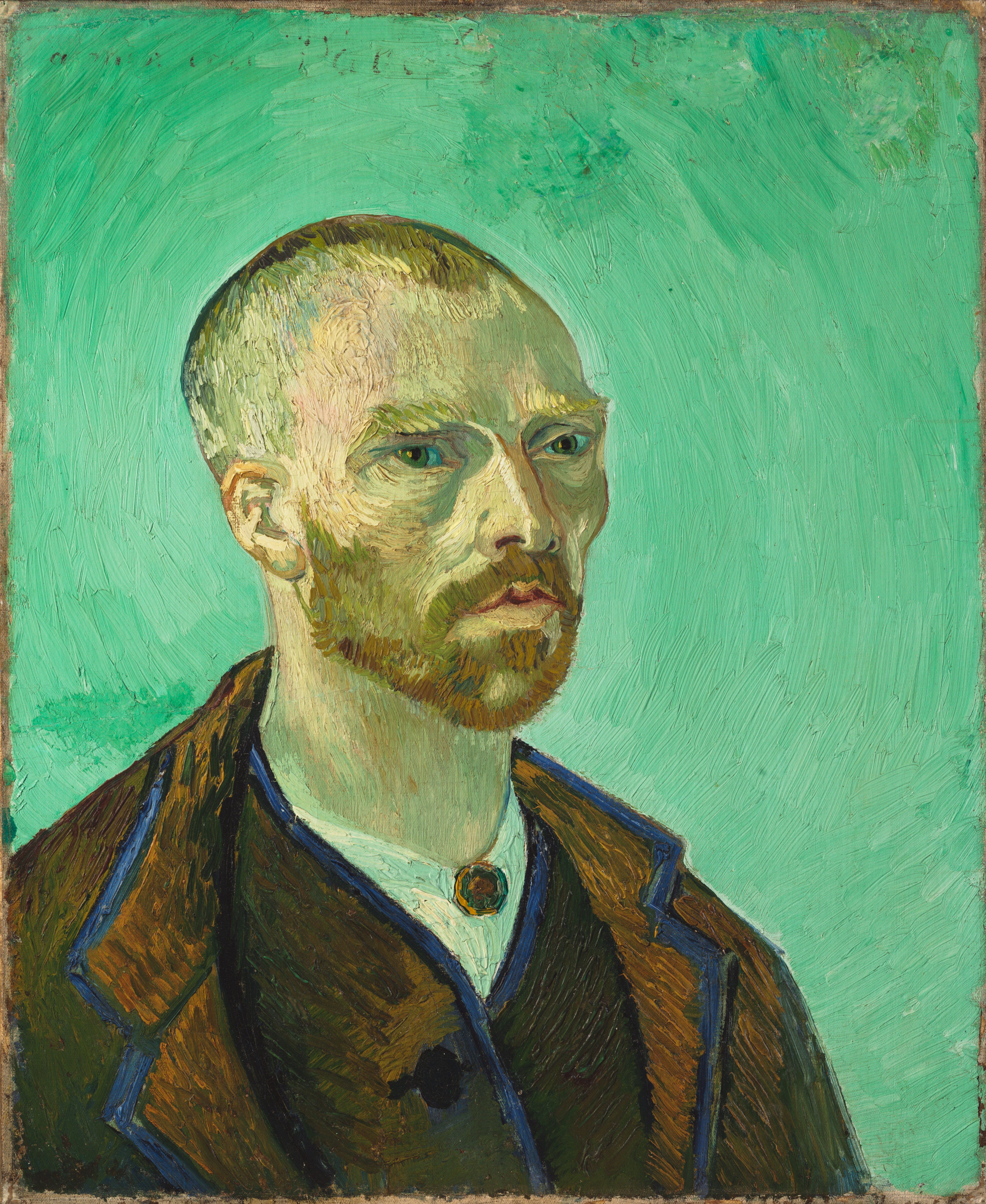
- Clockwise, from top left: Emerald crystals; Vintage buttons; Benches in Düsseldorf; Self-portrait by Vincent van Gogh; Stamp from Cyprus; Common green magpie.

Color coordinates
- Hex triplet: #00FF80
- sRGB^{B} (r, g, b): (0, 255, 128)
- HSV (h, s, v): (150°, 100%, 100%)
- CIELCh_{uv} (L, C, h): (88, 109, 137°)
- Source: RGB and CMYK color systems. The colour halfway between green and cyan on the RGB color wheel has a hex code of 00FF80.
- B: Normalized to [0–255] (byte); H: Normalized to [0–100] (hundred)

The RGB color wheel

Spring green is a color that was traditionally considered to be on the yellow side of green, but in modern computer systems based on the RGB color model is halfway between cyan and green on the color wheel.

The modern spring green, when plotted on the CIE chromaticity diagram, corresponds to a visual stimulus of about 505 nanometers on the visible spectrum. In HSV color space, the expression of which is known as the RGB color wheel, spring green has a hue of 150°. Spring green is one of the tertiary colors on the RGB color wheel, where it is the complementary color of rose.

The first recorded use of spring green as a color name in English was in 1766, referring to roughly the color now called spring bud.

== Spring green (computer) ==
=== Spring green (HTML) ===
Spring green

Color coordinates
- Hex triplet: #00FF80
- sRGB^{B} (r, g, b): (0, 255, 128)
- HSV (h, s, v): (150°, 100%, 100%)
- CIELCh_{uv} (L, C, h): (88, 109, 137°)
- Source: X11
- ISCC–NBS descriptor: Vivid bluish green
- B: Normalized to [0–255] (byte)

Spring green is a web color, common to X11 and HTML.

=== Medium spring green ===
Medium spring green

Color coordinates
- Hex triplet: #00FA9A
- sRGB^{B} (r, g, b): (0, 250, 154)
- HSV (h, s, v): (157°, 100%, 98%)
- CIELCh_{uv} (L, C, h): (87, 95, 143°)
- Source: X11
- ISCC–NBS descriptor: Vivid yellowish green
- B: Normalized to [0–255] (byte)

Displayed at right is the color medium spring green.

Medium spring green is a web color. It is close to but not right on the color wheel and it is a little closer to cyan than to green.

=== Dark spring green ===
Dark spring green

Color coordinates
- Hex triplet: #177245
- sRGB^{B} (r, g, b): (23, 114, 69)
- HSV (h, s, v): (150°, 80%, 45%)
- CIELCh_{uv} (L, C, h): (42, 43, 142°)
- Source: X11
- ISCC–NBS descriptor: Deep yellowish green
- B: Normalized to [0–255] (byte)

At right is displayed the web color dark spring green.

=== Additional variations of web spring green ===
==== Mint cream ====
Mint cream

Color coordinates
- Hex triplet: #F5FFFA
- sRGB^{B} (r, g, b): (245, 255, 250)
- HSV (h, s, v): (150°, 4%, 100%)
- CIELCh_{uv} (L, C, h): (99, 6, 153°)
- Source: X11
- ISCC–NBS descriptor: Very pale green
- B: Normalized to [0–255] (byte)

Displayed at right is the web color mint cream, a pale pastel tint of spring green.

The color mint cream is a representation of the color of the interior of an after dinner mint (which is disc shaped with mint flavored buttercream on the inside and a chocolate coating on the outside).

==== Sea green ====
Sea green

Color coordinates
- Hex triplet: #2E8B57
- sRGB^{B} (r, g, b): (46, 139, 87)
- HSV (h, s, v): (146°, 67%, 55%)
- CIELCh_{uv} (L, C, h): (52, 50, 141°)
- Source: HTML/CSS
- ISCC–NBS descriptor: Strong yellowish green
- B: Normalized to [0–255] (byte)

Flag of a proposed "British Republic" used by Chartists and Radicals in the nineteenth century. Sea green colors were often used by the Chartists and earlier Levellers. A group of 'English republican' intellectuals used a version of this tricolor with blue at the top.

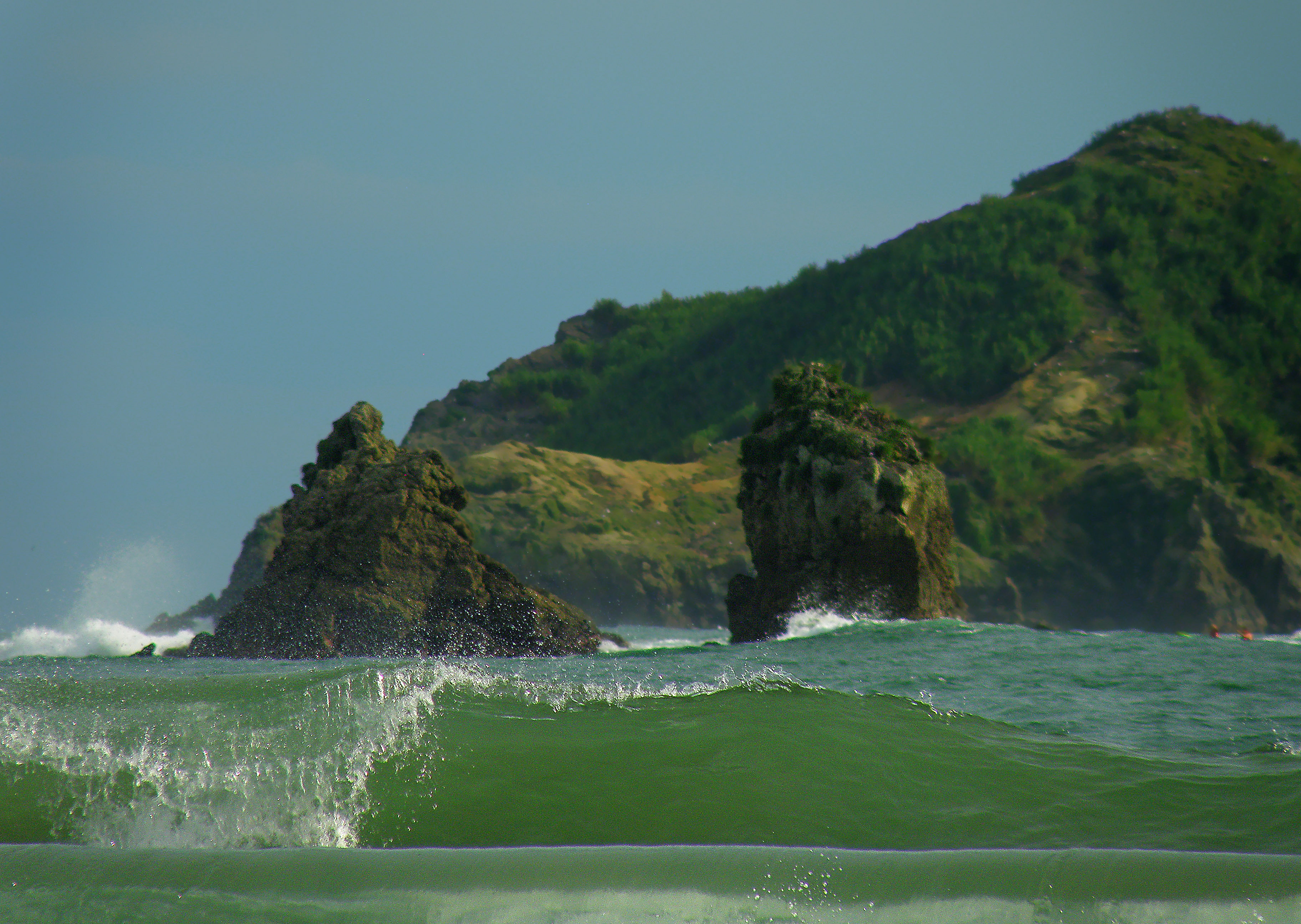
Green sea at Manuel Antonio Beach, Costa Rica

Sea green is a shade of cyan color that resembles the hue of shallow seawater as seen from the surface.

Sea green is notable for being the emblematic color of the Levellers party in the politics of 1640s England. Leveller supporters would wear a sea-green ribbon, in a similar manner to the present-day red AIDS awareness ribbon.

==== Medium sea green ====
Medium sea green

Color coordinates
- Hex triplet: #3CB371
- sRGB^{B} (r, g, b): (60, 179, 113)
- HSV (h, s, v): (147°, 66%, 70%)
- CIELCh_{uv} (L, C, h): (65, 64, 141°)
- Source: X11
- ISCC–NBS descriptor: Strong yellowish green
- B: Normalized to [0–255] (byte)

At right is displayed the web color medium sea green, a medium shade of spring green.

==== Aquamarine ====
Aquamarine

Color coordinates
- Hex triplet: #7FFFD4
- sRGB^{B} (r, g, b): (127, 255, 212)
- HSV (h, s, v): (160°, 50%, 100%)
- CIELCh_{uv} (L, C, h): (92, 60, 158°)
- Source: X11
- ISCC–NBS descriptor: Brilliant green
- B: Normalized to [0–255] (byte)

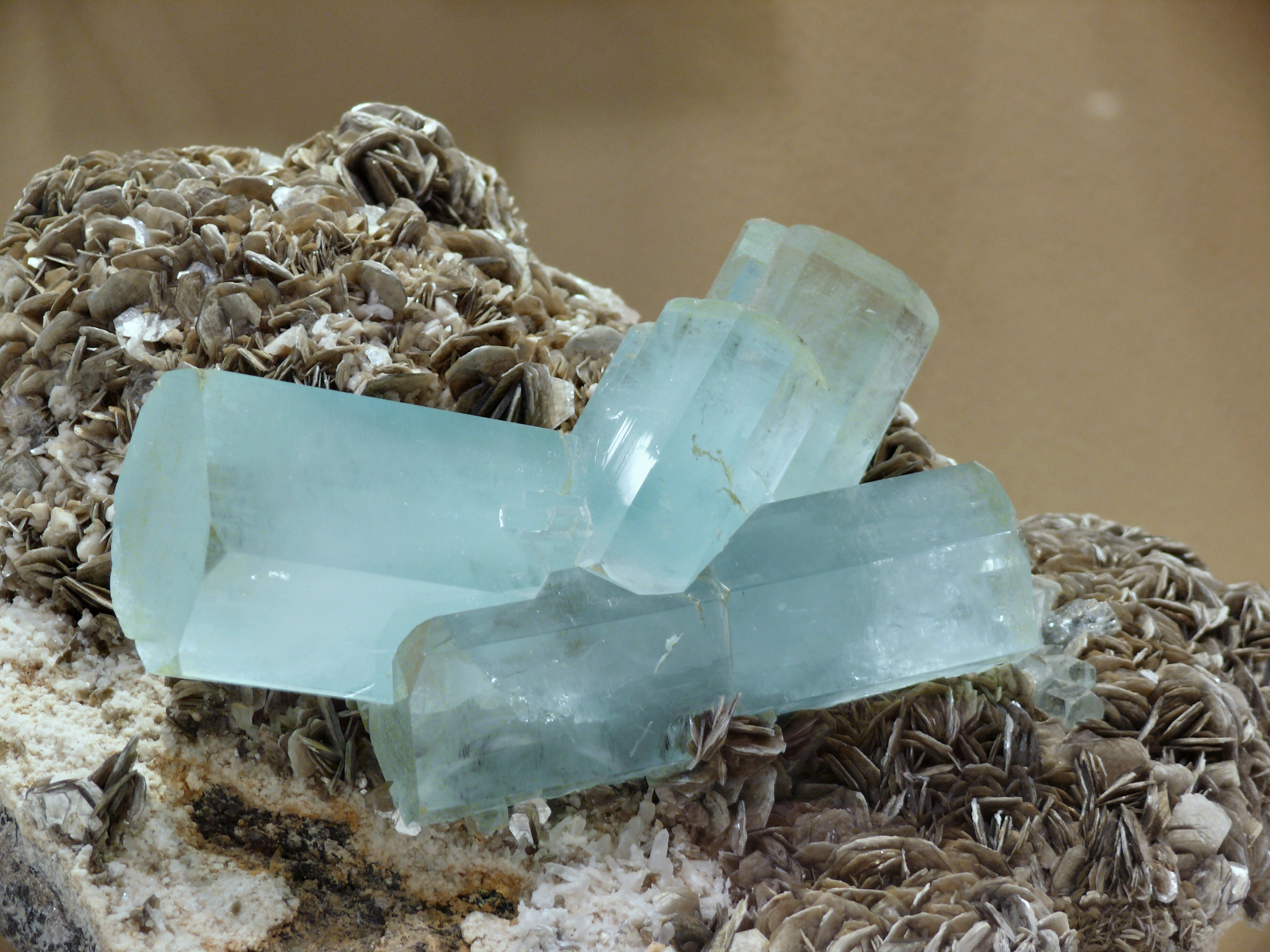
Aquamarine crystals on muscovite

Aquamarine is a color that is a pale bright tint of spring green toned toward cyan. It represents the color of the aquamarine gemstone. Aquamarine is the birthstone for those born on January 21 to February 20 in tropical zodiac, and February 14 to March 15 in sidereal zodiac.

== Spring green (traditional) ==
=== Spring bud ===
Spring Bud

Color coordinates
- Hex triplet: #A7FC00
- sRGB^{B} (r, g, b): (167, 252, 0)
- HSV (h, s, v): (80°, 100%, 99%)
- CIELCh_{uv} (L, C, h): (91, 114, 112°)
- Source: Maerz and Paul
- ISCC–NBS descriptor: Vivid yellow green
- B: Normalized to [0–255] (byte)

Spring bud is the color that used to be called spring green before the X11 web color spring green was formulated in 1987 when the X11 colors were first promulgated. This color is now called spring bud to avoid confusion with the web color.

The color is also called soft spring green, spring green (traditional), or spring green (M&P).

The first recorded use of spring green as a color name in English (meaning the color that is now called spring bud) was in 1766.

=== Emerald ===
Emerald

Color coordinates
- Hex triplet: #50C878
- sRGB^{B} (r, g, b): (80, 200, 120)
- HSV (h, s, v): (140°, 60%, 78%)
- CIELCh_{uv} (L, C, h): (72, 71, 137°)
- Source: Maerz and Paul
- ISCC–NBS descriptor: Vivid yellowish green
- B: Normalized to [0–255] (byte)

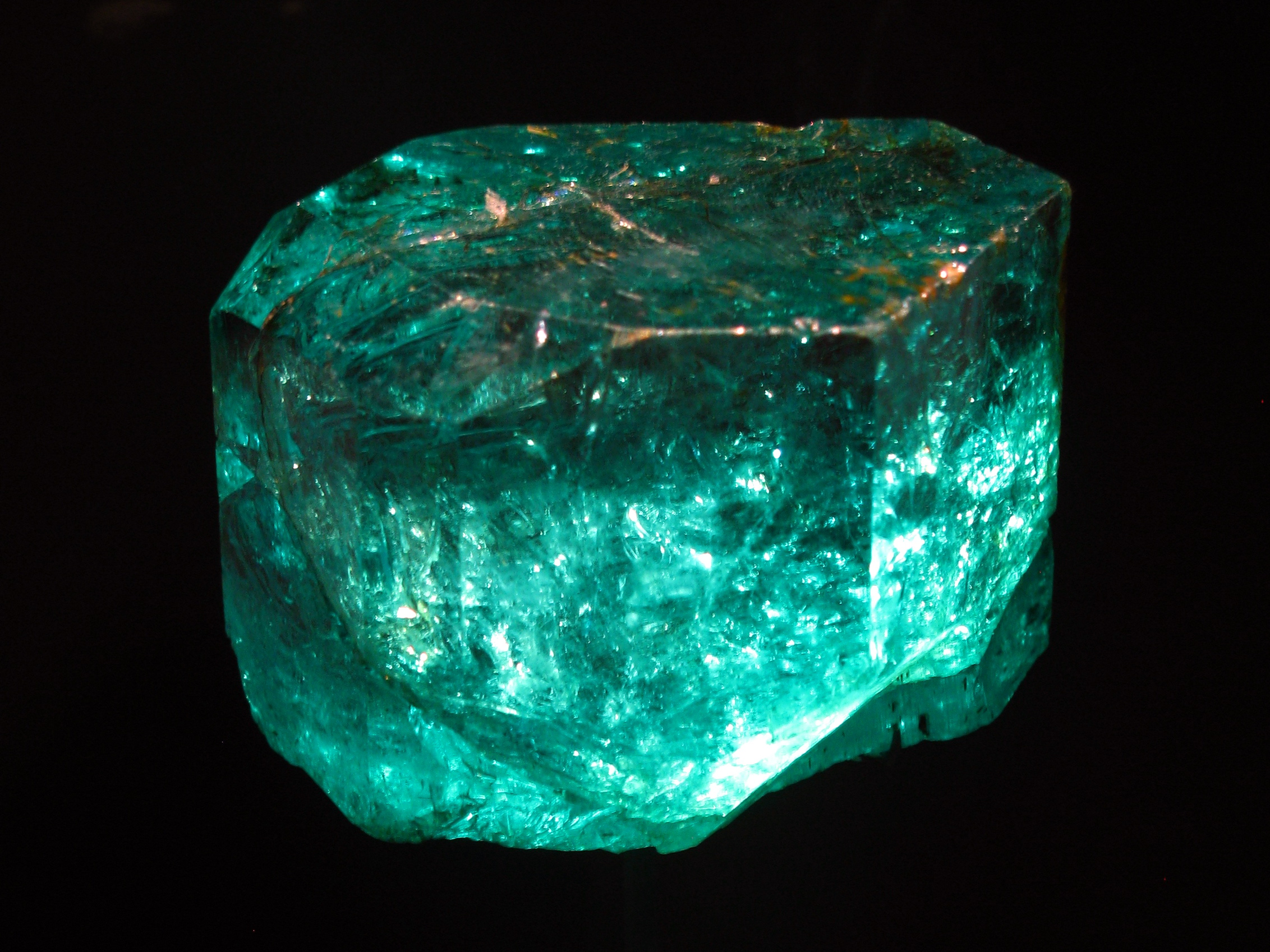
The emerald in the image is the Gachalá Emerald.

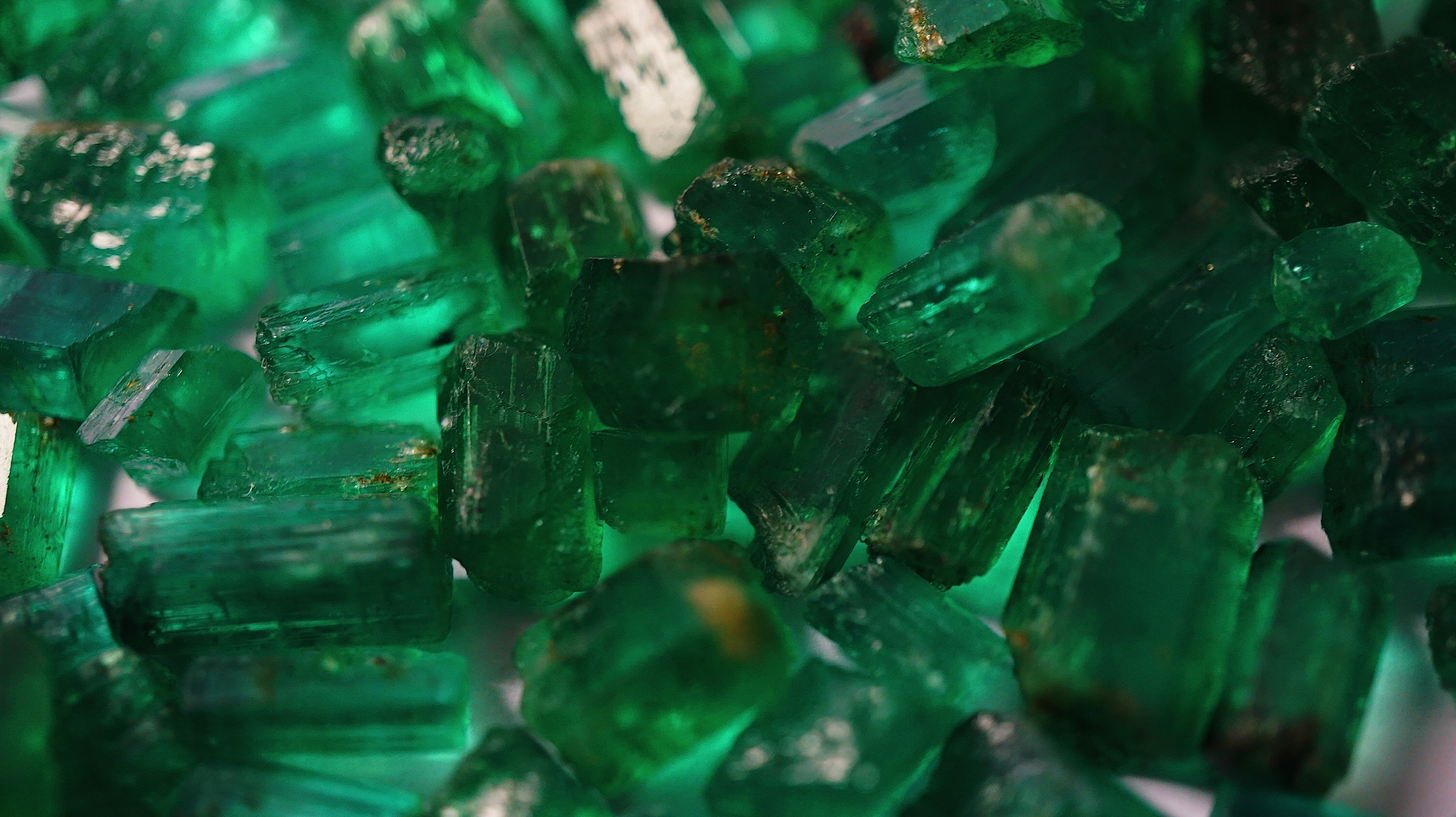
Emerald crystals

Emerald, also called emerald green, is a tone of green that is particularly light and bright, with a faint bluish cast. The name derives from the typical appearance of the emerald gemstone.

The first recorded use of emerald as a color name in English was in 1598. Ireland is sometimes referred to as the Emerald Isle due to its lush greenery. The May birthstone is emerald. Seattle is sometimes referred to as the Emerald City, because its abundant rainfall creates lush vegetation. In the Middle Ages, The Emerald Tablet of Hermes Trismegistus was believed to contain the secrets of alchemy. "Emerald City", from the story of The Wonderful Wizard of Oz, by L. Frank Baum, is a city where everything from food to people are emerald green. However, it is revealed at the end of the story that everything in the city is normal colored, but the glasses everyone wears are emerald tinted. The Green Zone in Baghdad is sometimes ironically and cynically referred to as the Emerald City. The Emerald Buddha is a figurine of the sitting Buddha, made of green jade (rather than emerald), clothed in gold, and about 45 cm tall. It is kept in the Chapel of the Emerald Buddha (Wat Phra Kaew) on the grounds of the Grand Palace in Bangkok. The Emerald Triangle refers to the three counties of Mendocino, Humboldt, and Trinity in Northern California, United States because these three counties are the biggest marijuana producing counties in California and also the US. A county-commissioned study reports pot accounts for up to two-thirds of the economy of Mendocino. Emerald Cities: Urban Sustainability and Economic Development is a book published in 2010 by Joan Fitzgerald, director of the law, policy and society program at Northeastern University, about ecologically sustainable city planning.

Emerald was invented in Germany in 1814. By taking acetic acid, mixing and boiling it with vinegar, and then by adding some arsenic, a bright blue-green hue was formed. During the 19th century, the arsenic-containing dye Paris green was marketed as emerald green. It was notorious for causing deaths due to it being a popular color used for wallpaper. Victorian women used this bright color for dresses, and florists used it on fake flowers.

=== Viridian ===
Viridian

Color coordinates
- Hex triplet: #40826D
- sRGB^{B} (r, g, b): (64, 130, 109)
- HSV (h, s, v): (161°, 51%, 51%)
- CIELCh_{uv} (L, C, h): (50, 31, 160°)
- Source: Maerz and Paul
- ISCC–NBS descriptor: Moderate green
- B: Normalized to [0–255] (byte)

At right is displayed the color viridian, a medium tone of spring green.

The first recorded use of viridian as a color name in English was in the 1860s (exact year uncertain).

== Other variations of spring green ==
=== Green (CMYK) (pigment green) ===
Green (CMYK) (pigment green)

Color coordinates
- Hex triplet: #00A550
- sRGB^{B} (r, g, b): (0, 165, 80)
- HSV (h, s, v): (149°, 100%, 65%)
- CIELCh_{uv} (L, C, h): (59, 74, 137°)
- Source: CMYK
- ISCC–NBS descriptor: Vivid yellowish green
- B: Normalized to [0–255] (byte)

The color defined as green in the CMYK color system used in printing, also known as pigment green, is the tone of green that is achieved by mixing process (printer's) cyan and process (printer's) yellow in equal proportions. It is displayed at adjacent.

Cyan, magenta, and yellow are the three subtractive primary colors used in printing.

The purpose of the CMYK color system is to provide the maximum possible gamut of color reproducible in printing.

The color indicated is only approximate as the colors of printing inks may vary.

=== Green (NCS) (psychological primary green) ===
Green (NCS)

Color coordinates
- Hex triplet: #009F6B
- sRGB^{B} (r, g, b): (0, 159, 107)
- HSV (h, s, v): (160°, 100%, 62%)
- CIELCh_{uv} (L, C, h): (58, 58, 148°)
- Source: sRGB approximation to NCS 2060-G
- ISCC–NBS descriptor: Strong yellowish green
- B: Normalized to [0–255] (byte)

The color defined as green in the NCS or Natural Color System is shown at adjacent (NCS 2060-G). The natural color system is a color system based on the four unique hues or psychological primary colors red, yellow, green, and blue. The NCS is based on the opponent process theory of vision.

Approximations within the sRGB gamut to the primary colors of the Natural Color System, a model based on the opponent process theory of color vision.

The Natural Color System is widely used in Scandinavia.

=== Green (Munsell) ===
Green (Munsell)
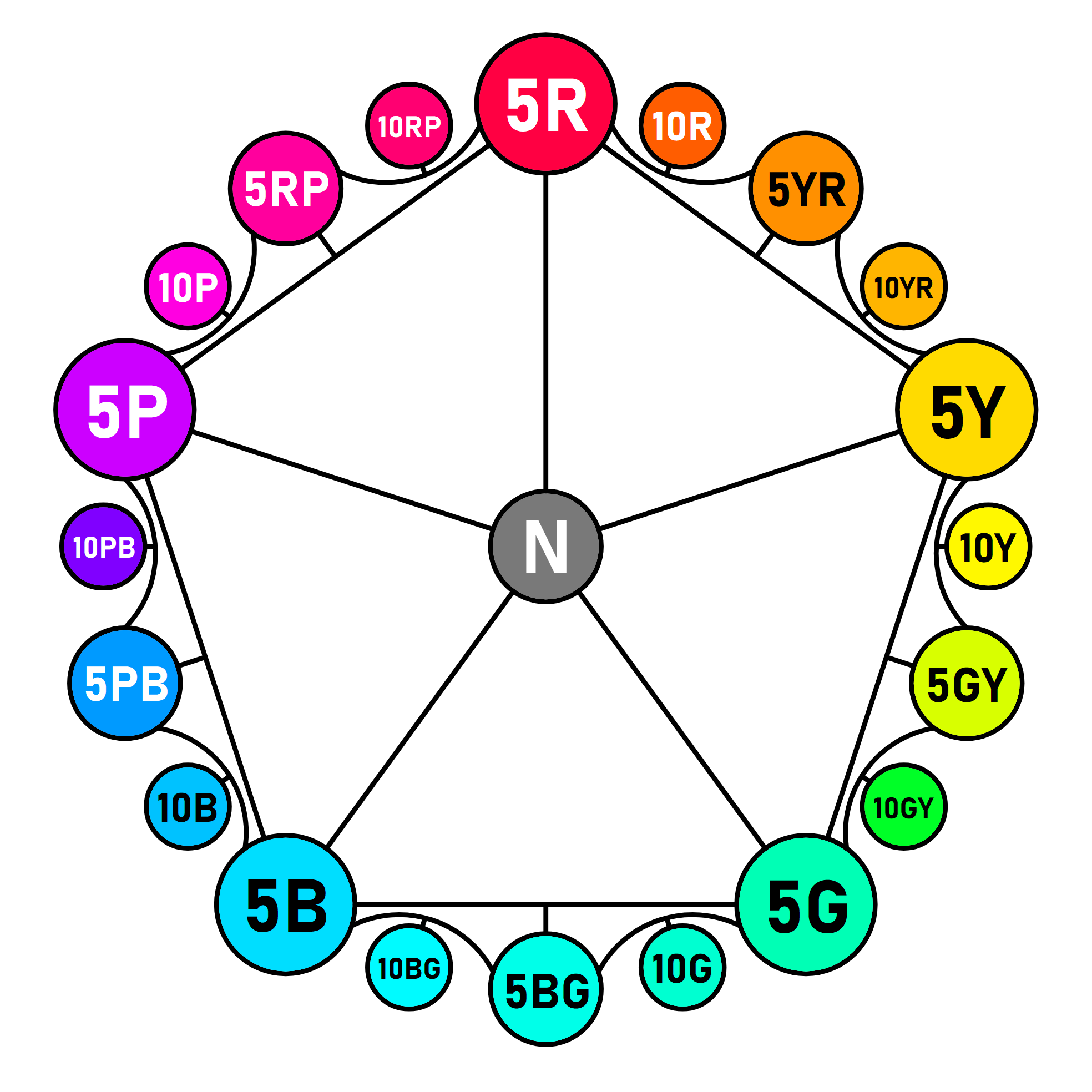
- The hues of the Munsell color system, at varying values, and maximum chroma to stay in the sRGB gamut

Color coordinates
- Hex triplet: #00FFB5
- sRGB^{B} (r, g, b): (0, 255, 181)
- HSV (h, s, v): (163°, 100%, 100%)
- CIELCh_{uv} (L, C, h): (89, 87, 151°)
- Source: https://pteromys.melonisland.net/munsell/
- ISCC–NBS descriptor: Brilliant green
- B: Normalized to [0–255] (byte)

The Munsell color system is a color space that specifies colors based on three color dimensions: hue, value (lightness), and chroma (colorfulness), spaced uniformly (in terms of human perception) in three dimensions in the Munsell color solid. In order for all the colors to be spaced uniformly, it was found necessary to use a color wheel with five, non-arbitrary, equally spaced primary colors: red, yellow, green, blue, and purple.

The color of the sample is the most chromatic (colorful) green in the sRGB gamut that falls in the hue of 5G (primary green) in the Munsell color space.

=== Green (Pantone) ===
Green (Pantone)

Color coordinates
- Hex triplet: #00AD83
- sRGB^{B} (r, g, b): (0, 173, 131)
- HSV (h, s, v): (165°, 100%, 68%)
- CIELCh_{uv} (L, C, h): (63, 58, 157°)
- Source: Pantone TPX
- ISCC–NBS descriptor: Brilliant green
- B: Normalized to [0–255] (byte)

Green (Pantone) is the color that is called green in Pantone.

The source of this color is the "Pantone Textile Paper eXtended (TPX)" color list, color # green C, EC, HC, PC, U, or UP—green.

=== Green (Crayola) ===
Green (Crayola)

Color coordinates
- Hex triplet: #1CAC78
- sRGB^{B} (r, g, b): (28, 172, 120)
- HSV (h, s, v): (158°, 84%, 67%)
- CIELCh_{uv} (L, C, h): (63, 60, 149°)
- Source: Crayola
- ISCC–NBS descriptor: Strong yellowish green
- B: Normalized to [0–255] (byte)

Green (Crayola) is the color called green in Crayola crayons.

Green was one of the original Crayola crayons introduced in 1903.

=== Erin ===
Erin

Color coordinates
- Hex triplet: #00FF40
- sRGB^{B} (r, g, b): (0, 255, 64)
- HSV (h, s, v): (135°, 100%, 100%)
- CIELCh_{uv} (L, C, h): (88, 129, 130°)
- Source: Maerz and Paul
- ISCC–NBS descriptor: Vivid yellowish green
- B: Normalized to [0–255] (byte)

Adjacent is displayed the color erin. The first recorded use of erin as a color name was in 1922.

=== Bright mint ===
Bright mint

Color coordinates
- Hex triplet: #4FFFB0
- sRGB^{B} (r, g, b): (79, 255, 176)
- HSV (h, s, v): (153°, 69%, 100%)
- CIELCh_{uv} (L, C, h): (90, 84, 146°)
- ISCC–NBS descriptor: Vivid yellowish green
- B: Normalized to [0–255] (byte)

Displayed adjacent is the color bright mint.

=== Dark green ===
Dark green

Color coordinates
- Hex triplet: #013220
- sRGB^{B} (r, g, b): (1, 50, 32)
- HSV (h, s, v): (158°, 98%, 20%)
- CIELCh_{uv} (L, C, h): (17, 17, 150°)
- Source: Encycolorpedia
- ISCC–NBS descriptor: Very dark yellowish green
- B: Normalized to [0–255] (byte)

Dark green is a dark shade of green. A different shade of green has been designated as "dark green (X11)" for certain computer uses.

=== Dark pastel green ===
Dark pastel green

Color coordinates
- Hex triplet: #03C03C
- sRGB^{B} (r, g, b): (3, 192, 60)
- HSV (h, s, v): (138°, 98%, 75%)
- CIELCh_{uv} (L, C, h): (68, 96, 131°)
- Source: Encycolorpedia
- ISCC–NBS descriptor: Vivid yellowish green
- B: Normalized to [0–255] (byte)

Adjacent is the color dark pastel green.

=== Screamin' green ===
Screamin' green

Color coordinates
- Hex triplet: #76FF7A
- sRGB^{B} (r, g, b): (118, 255, 122)
- HSV (h, s, v): (122°, 54%, 100%)
- CIELCh_{uv} (L, C, h): (90, 100, 128°)
- Source: Crayola
- ISCC–NBS descriptor: Vivid yellowish green
- B: Normalized to [0–255] (byte)

The color screamin' green is shown adjacent.

This color was renamed from ultra green by Crayola in 1990.

This color is a fluorescent color.

=== Caribbean green ===
Caribbean green

Color coordinates
- Hex triplet: #00CC99
- sRGB^{B} (r, g, b): (0, 204, 153)
- HSV (h, s, v): (165°, 100%, 80%)
- CIELCh_{uv} (L, C, h): (73, 68, 155°)
- Source: Crayola
- ISCC–NBS descriptor: Vivid green
- B: Normalized to [0–255] (byte)

Adjacent is displayed the color Caribbean green. This is a Crayola color formulated in 1997.

=== Magic mint ===
Magic mint

Color coordinates
- Hex triplet: #AAF0D1
- sRGB^{B} (r, g, b): (170, 240, 209)
- HSV (h, s, v): (153°, 29%, 94%)
- CIELCh_{uv} (L, C, h): (90, 38, 154°)
- Source: Crayola
- ISCC–NBS descriptor: Very light green
- B: Normalized to [0–255] (byte)

Adjacent is displayed the color magic mint, a light tint of spring green.

The color magic mint is a light tint of the color mint.

Ceramic tiles in a similar color, often with a contrasting black border, were a popular choice for bathroom, kitchen and upmarket hotel swimming pool décor during the 1930s.

This is a Crayola color formulated in 1990 (later retired in 2003).

=== Mint ===
Mint

Color coordinates
- Hex triplet: #00FF40
- sRGB^{B} (r, g, b): (0, 255, 64)
- HSV (h, s, v): (135°, 100%, 100%)
- CIELCh_{uv} (L, C, h): (88, 129, 130°)
- Source: ISCC-NBS
- ISCC–NBS descriptor: Brilliant green
- B: Normalized to [0–255] (byte)

The color mint, also known as mint leaf, is a representation of the color of mint.

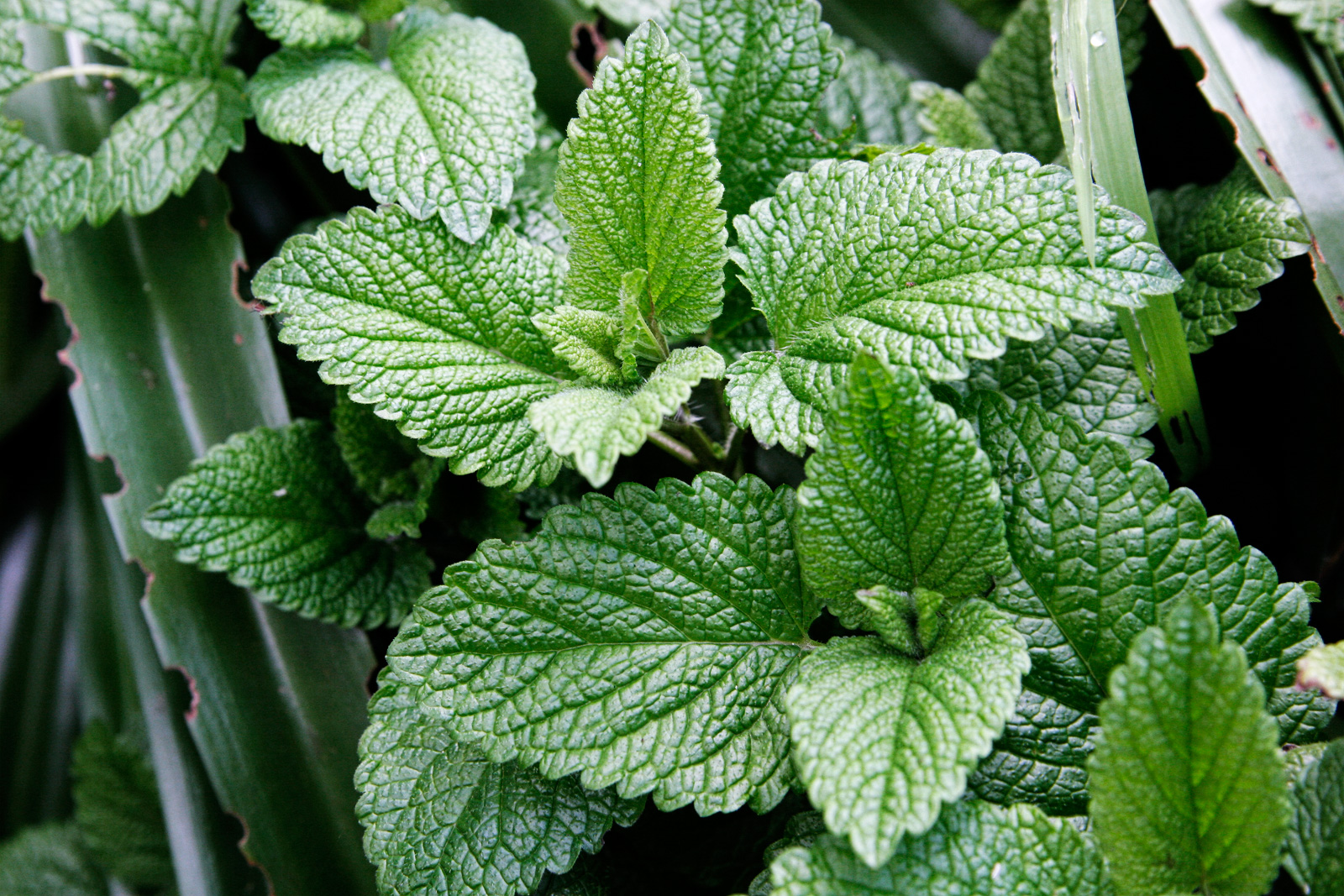
Mint leaves

The first recorded use of mint as a color name in English was in 1920.

=== Mountain meadow ===
Mountain meadow

Color coordinates
- Hex triplet: #30BA8F
- sRGB^{B} (r, g, b): (48, 186, 143)
- HSV (h, s, v): (161°, 74%, 73%)
- CIELCh_{uv} (L, C, h): (68, 57, 156°)
- Source: Crayola
- ISCC–NBS descriptor: Brilliant green
- B: Normalized to [0–255] (byte)

Displayed adjacent is the color mountain meadow.

Mountain meadow is a Crayola crayon color formulated in 1998.

=== Persian green ===
Persian green

Color coordinates
- Hex triplet: #00A693
- sRGB^{B} (r, g, b): (0, 166, 147)
- HSV (h, s, v): (173°, 100%, 65%)
- CIELCh_{uv} (L, C, h): (61, 50, 174°)
- Source: ISCC-NBS
- ISCC–NBS descriptor: Brilliant bluish green
- B: Normalized to [0–255] (byte)

Persian green is a color used in pottery and Persian carpets in Iran.

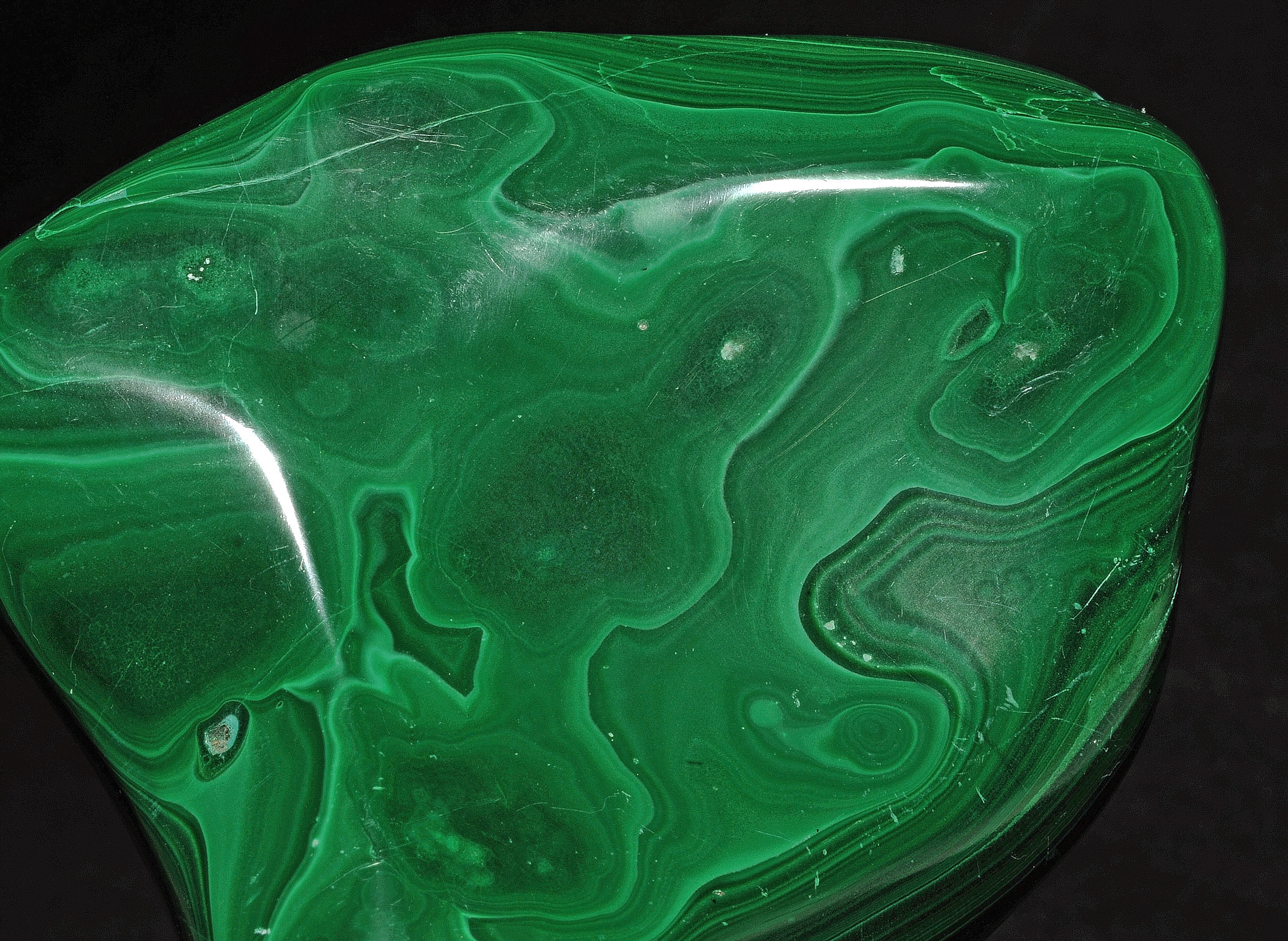
Malachite is Persian green in color.

Other colors associated with Persia include Persian red and Persian blue. The color Persian green is named from the green color of some Persian pottery and is a representation of the color of the mineral malachite. It is a popular color in Iran because the color green symbolizes gardens, nature, heaven, and sanctity. The first recorded use of Persian green as a color name in English was in 1892.

=== Sea foam green ===
Sea foam green

Color coordinates
- Hex triplet: #9FE2BF
- sRGB^{B} (r, g, b): (159, 226, 191)
- HSV (h, s, v): (149°, 30%, 89%)
- CIELCh_{uv} (L, C, h): (85, 39, 148°)
- Source: Crayola
- ISCC–NBS descriptor: Very light green
- B: Normalized to [0–255] (byte)

This is the Crayola version of the above color, a much brighter and lighter shade. It was introduced in 2001.

The New York Liberty of the WNBA use this shade as a team color.

=== Shamrock green (Irish green) ===
Shamrock green

Common connotations
- St. Patrick's Day

Color coordinates
- Hex triplet: #009E60
- sRGB^{B} (r, g, b): (0, 158, 96)
- HSV (h, s, v): (156°, 100%, 62%)
- CIELCh_{uv} (L, C, h): (57, 62, 143°)
- Source: Maerz and Paul
- ISCC–NBS descriptor: Strong yellowish green
- B: Normalized to [0–255] (byte)

Shamrock green is a tone of green that represents the color of shamrocks, a symbol of Ireland.

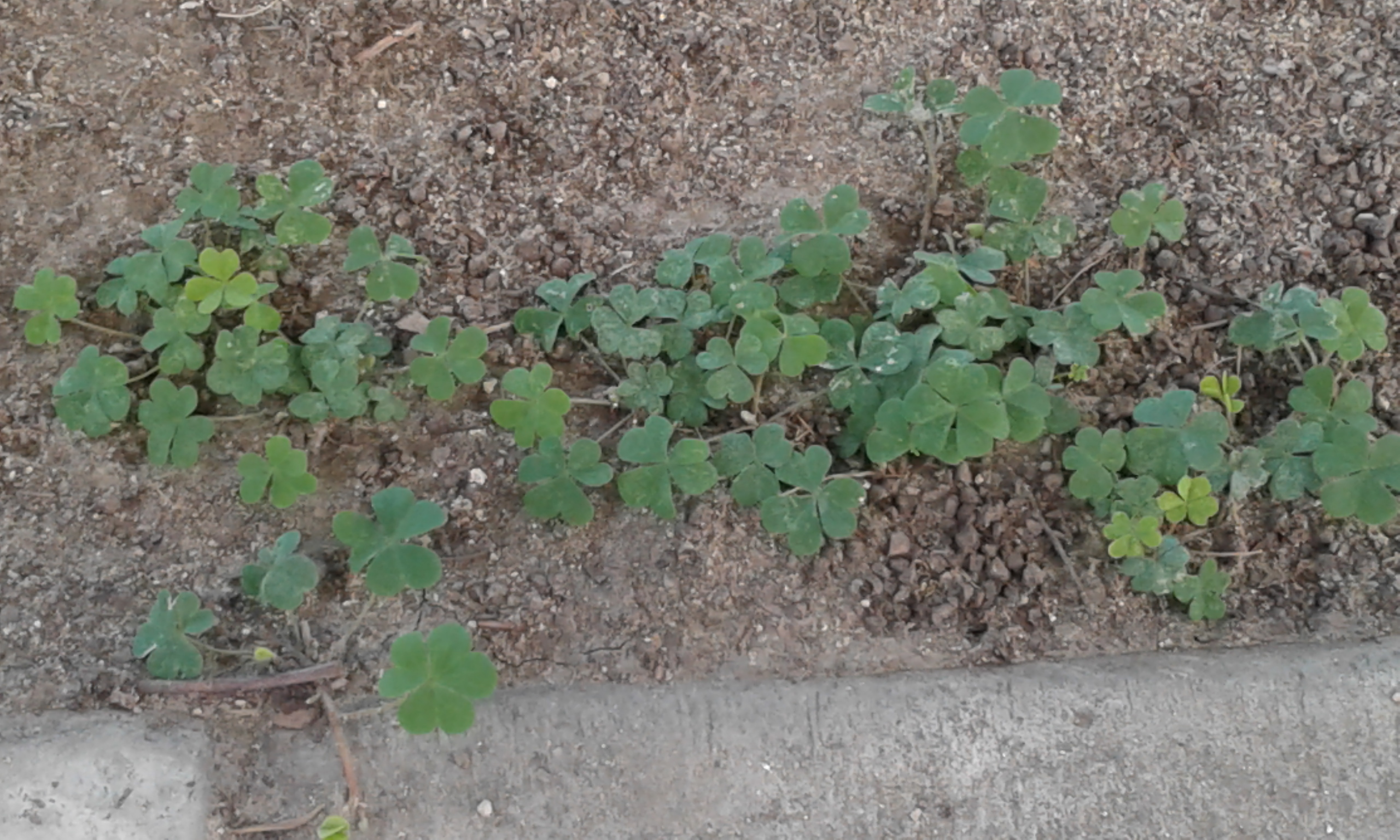
Shamrocks

The first recorded use of shamrock as a color name in English was in the 1820s (exact year uncertain).

This green is also defined as Irish green Pantone 347.

This green is used as the green on the national flag of Ireland.

It is customary in Ireland, Australia, New Zealand, Canada, and the United States to wear this or any other tone of green on St. Patrick's Day, 17 March.

The State of California uses this shade of green of the grass under the bear on their state flag.

The Boston Celtics of the National Basketball Association use this shade for their uniforms, logos, and other memorabilia.

=== Sap green ===
Sap green

Color coordinates
- Hex triplet: #123524
- sRGB^{B} (r, g, b): (18, 53, 36)
- HSV (h, s, v): (151°, 66%, 21%)
- CIELCh_{uv} (L, C, h): (19, 15, 146°)
- Source: The Mother of All HTML Colo(u)r Charts
- ISCC–NBS descriptor: Very dark yellowish green
- B: Normalized to [0–255] (byte)

Sap green is a green pigment that was traditionally made of ripe buckthorn berries. However, modern colors marketed under this name are usually a blend of other pigments, commonly with a basis of Phthalocyanine Green G. Sap green paint was frequently used on Bob Ross's TV show, The Joy of Painting.

=== Jade ===
Jade

Color coordinates
- Hex triplet: #00A86B
- sRGB^{B} (r, g, b): (0, 168, 107)
- HSV (h, s, v): (158°, 100%, 66%)
- CIELCh_{uv} (L, C, h): (61, 64, 145°)
- ISCC–NBS descriptor: Strong yellowish green
- B: Normalized to [0–255] (byte)

Jade, also called jade green, is a representation of the color of the gemstone called jade, although the stone itself varies widely in hue.

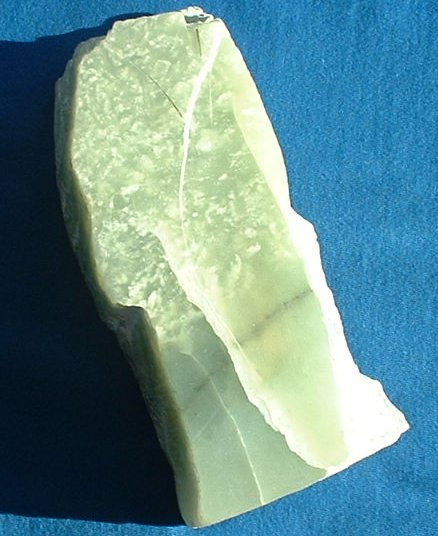
A slab of jade

The color name jade green was first used in Spanish in the form piedra de ijada in 1569. The first recorded use of jade green as a color name in English was in 1892.

=== Malachite ===
Malachite

Color coordinates
- Hex triplet: #0BDA51
- sRGB^{B} (r, g, b): (11, 218, 81)
- HSV (h, s, v): (140°, 95%, 85%)
- CIELCh_{uv} (L, C, h): (77, 104, 132°)
- Source: Maerz and Paul
- ISCC–NBS descriptor: Vivid yellowish green
- B: Normalized to [0–255] (byte)

Malachite, also called malachite green, is a color that is a representation of the color of the mineral malachite.

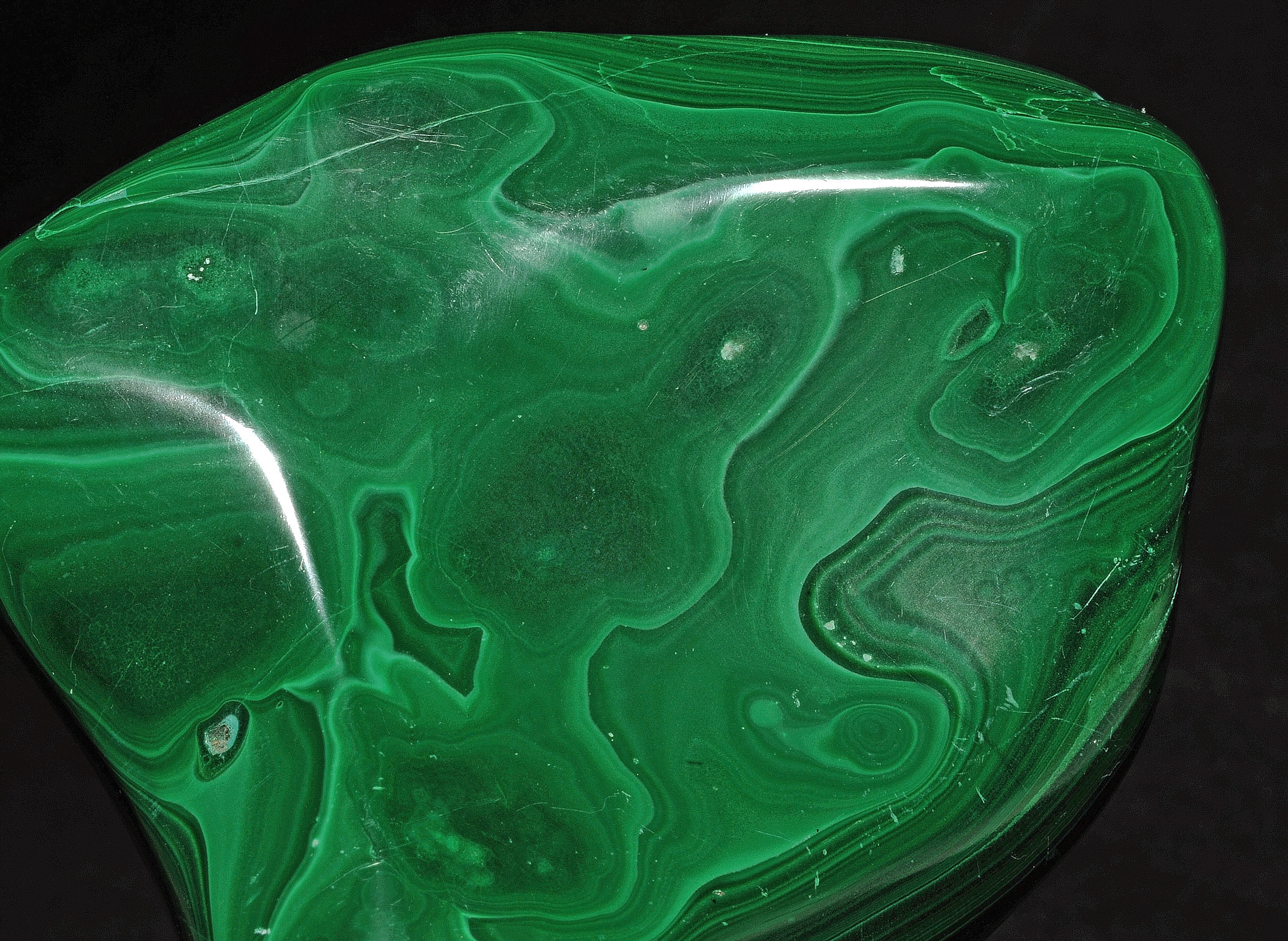
Polished malachite

The first recorded use of malachite green as a color name in English was in the 1200s (exact year uncertain).

=== Brunswick green ===
Brunswick green

Color coordinates
- Hex triplet: #1B4D3E
- sRGB^{B} (r, g, b): (27, 77, 62)
- HSV (h, s, v): (162°, 65%, 30%)
- CIELCh_{uv} (L, C, h): (29, 21, 160°)
- ISCC–NBS descriptor: Dark green
- B: Normalized to [0–255] (byte)

Brunswick green is a common name for green pigments made from copper compounds, although the name has also been used for other formulations that produce a similar hue, such as mixtures of chrome yellow and Prussian blue. The pigment is named after Braunschweig, Germany (also known as Brunswick in English) where it was first manufactured. It is a deep, dark green, which may vary from intense to very dark, almost black.

The first recorded use of Brunswick green as a color name in English was in 1764. Another name for this color is English green. The first use of English green as a synonym for Brunswick green was in 1923.

Deep Brunswick green is commonly recognized as part of the British racing green spectrum, the national auto racing color of the United Kingdom.

A different color, also called Brunswick green, was the color for passenger locomotives of the grouping and then the nationalized British Railways. There were three shades of these colors and they are defined under British Standard BS381C – 225, BS381C – 226, and BS381C – 227 (ordered from lightest to darkest). The Brunswick green used by the Nationalised British Railways – Western Region for passenger locomotives was BS381C – 227 (rgb(30:62:46)). RAL6005 is a close substitute to BS381C – 227. A characteristic of these colors was the ease for various railway locations to mix them by using whole pots of primary colors – hence the ability to get reasonably consistent colors with manual mixing half a century and more ago.

The color used by the Pennsylvania Railroad for locomotives was often called Brunswick green, but officially was termed dark green locomotive enamel (DGLE). This was a shade of green so dark as to be almost black, but which turned greener with age and weathering as the copper compounds further oxidized.

=== Castleton green ===
Castleton green

Color coordinates
- Hex triplet: #00563B
- sRGB^{B} (r, g, b): (0, 86, 59)
- HSV (h, s, v): (161°, 100%, 34%)
- CIELCh_{uv} (L, C, h): (32, 31, 151°)
- Source: Castleton Colors
- ISCC–NBS descriptor: Dark yellowish green
- B: Normalized to [0–255] (byte)

Castleton green is one of the two official colors of Castleton University in Vermont. The official college colors are green (PMS 343) and white. The Castleton University Office of Marketing and Communications created the Castleton colors for web and logo development and has technical guidelines, copyright and privacy protection; as well as logos and images that developers are asked to follow in the college's guidelines for using official Castleton logos. If web developers are using green on a university website, they are encouraged to use Castleton green. It is prominently used for representing Castleton's athletic teams, the Castleton Spartans.

=== Bottle green ===
Bottle green

Color coordinates
- Hex triplet: #006A4E
- sRGB^{B} (r, g, b): (0, 106, 78)
- HSV (h, s, v): (164°, 100%, 42%)
- CIELCh_{uv} (L, C, h): (39, 36, 155°)
- Source: Encycolorpedia
- ISCC–NBS descriptor: Dark green
- B: Normalized to [0–255] (byte)

Bottle green is a dark shade of green, similar to pine green. It is a representation of the color of green glass bottles.

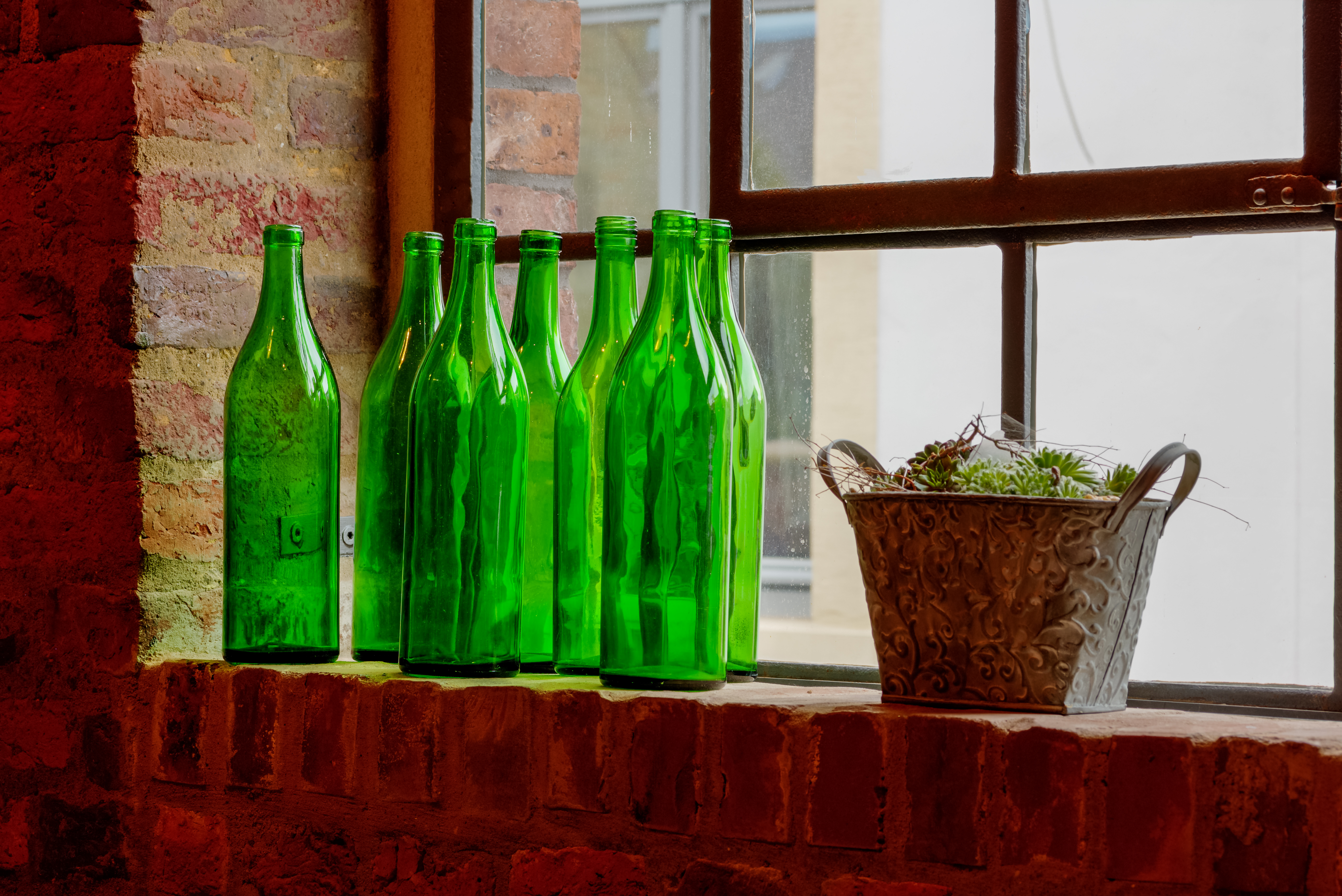
Green bottles on a windowsill

The first recorded use of bottle green as a color name in English was in 1816.

Bottle green is a color in Prismacolor marker and pencil sets. It is also the color of the uniform of the Police Service of Northern Ireland replacing the Royal Ulster Constabulary's "rifle green" colored uniforms in 2001. It is also the green used in uniforms for South Sydney High School in Sydney.

Bottle green is also the color most associated with guide signs and street name signs in the United States.

Bottle green is also the background color of the Flag of Bangladesh, as defined by the government of Bangladesh. Another name for this color is Bangladesh green.

=== Dartmouth green ===
Dartmouth green

Color coordinates
- Hex triplet: #00693E
- sRGB^{B} (r, g, b): (0, 105, 62)
- HSV (h, s, v): (155°, 100%, 41%)
- CIELCh_{uv} (L, C, h): (39, 42, 143°)
- Source: Dartmouth Brand Guide
- ISCC–NBS descriptor: Deep yellowish green
- B: Normalized to [0–255] (byte)

Dartmouth green is the official color of Dartmouth College, adopted in 1866. It was chosen for being the only decent primary color that had not been taken already. It is prominently used as the name of the Dartmouth College athletic team, the Dartmouth Big Green. The Dartmouth athletic teams adopted this new name after the college officially discontinued the use of its unofficial mascot, the Dartmouth Indian, in 1974.

Dartmouth green and white are the main colors of Lithuanian basketball club Žalgiris Kaunas.

=== GO Transit green ===
GO green

Color coordinates
- Hex triplet: #00AB66
- sRGB^{B} (r, g, b): (0, 171, 102)
- HSV (h, s, v): (156°, 100%, 67%)
- CIELCh_{uv} (L, C, h): (62, 68, 143°)
- Source: Legislative Assembly of Ontario
- ISCC–NBS descriptor: Vivid yellowish green
- B: Normalized to [0–255] (byte)

GO green was the color used for the brand of GO Transit, the regional commuter service in the Greater Toronto Area.

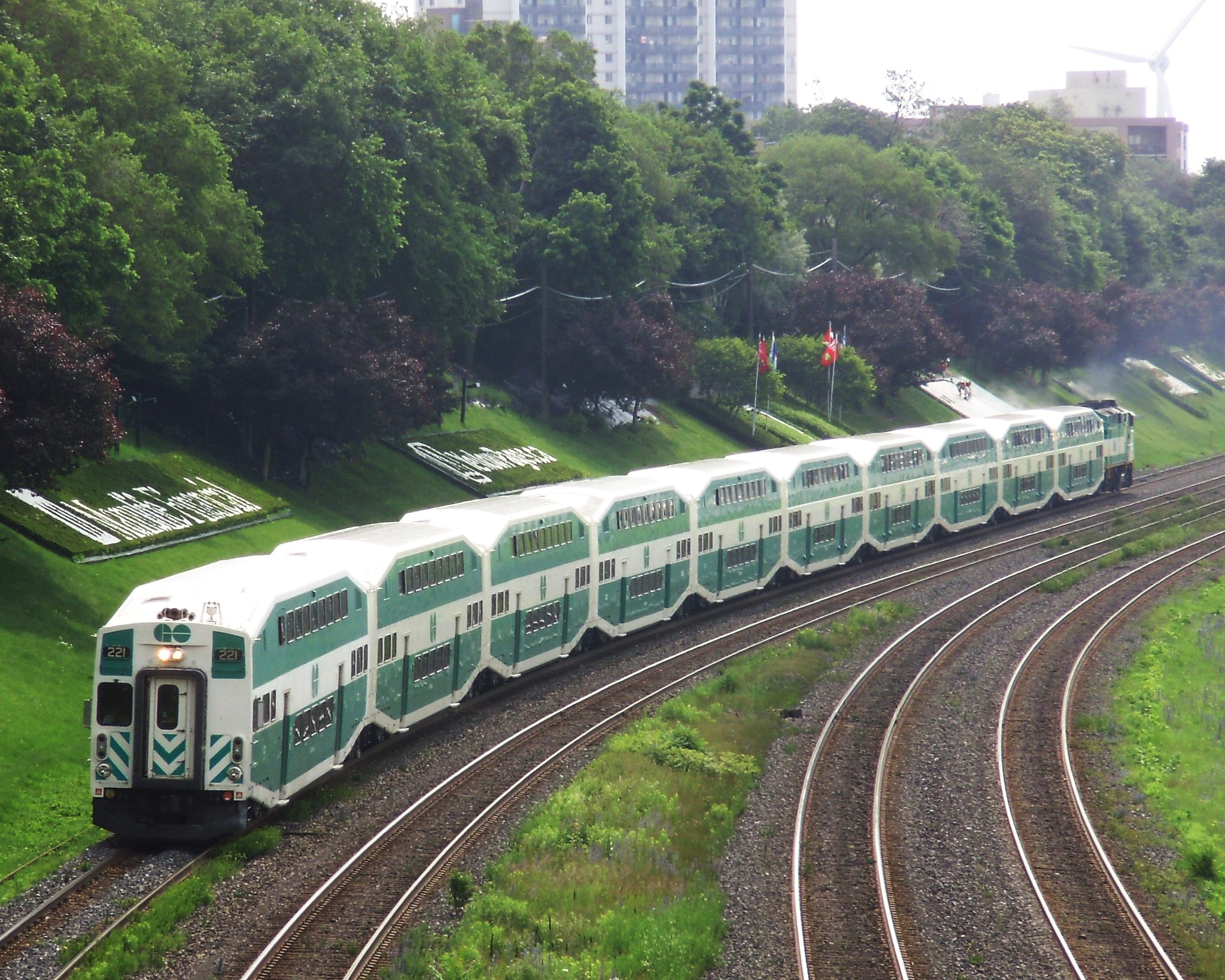
A GO Transit train on the Lakeshore West line in Toronto, Canada

Between 1967 and 2013, the brand and color that has adorned each of its trains, buses, and other property generally remained unchanged. It also matched the shade of green used on signs for highways in Ontario. In July 2013, GO Transit updated its look to a two-tone color scheme.

=== Gotham green ===
Gotham green

Color coordinates
- Hex triplet: #00573F
- sRGB^{B} (r, g, b): (0, 87, 63)
- HSV (h, s, v): (163°, 100%, 34%)
- CIELCh_{uv} (L, C, h): (32, 30, 155°)
- ISCC–NBS descriptor: Dark yellowish green
- B: Normalized to [0–255] (byte)

Gotham green is the official color of the New York Jets as of 4 April 2019. The name is a reference to one of the Nicknames of New York City.

=== Pakistan green ===
Pakistan green

Color coordinates
- Hex triplet: #01411C
- sRGB^{B} (r, g, b): (1, 65, 28)
- HSV (h, s, v): (145°, 98%, 25%)
- CIELCh_{uv} (L, C, h): (23, 28, 137°)
- ISCC–NBS descriptor: Deep yellowish green
- B: Normalized to [0–255] (byte)

Pakistan green is a shade of dark green, used in web development and graphic design. It is also the background color of the national flag of Pakistan. It is almost identical to the HTML/X11 dark green in sRGB and HSV values.

=== Sacramento State green ===
Sacramento State green

Color coordinates
- Hex triplet: #043927
- sRGB^{B} (r, g, b): (4, 57, 39)
- HSV (h, s, v): (160°, 93%, 22%)
- CIELCh_{uv} (L, C, h): (20, 19, 152°)
- Source: Sacramento State
- ISCC–NBS descriptor: Very dark yellowish green
- B: Normalized to [0–255] (byte)

In 2004, California State University, Sacramento rebranded itself as Sacramento State, while keeping the official name as the long form. In the process of rebranding a new logo was selected, and in 2005 it formalized the colors which it would use.

=== Paris green ===
Paris green

Color coordinates
- Hex triplet: #50C878
- sRGB^{B} (r, g, b): (80, 200, 120)
- HSV (h, s, v): (140°, 60%, 78%)
- CIELCh_{uv} (L, C, h): (72, 71, 137°)
- ISCC–NBS descriptor: Vivid yellowish green
- B: Normalized to [0–255] (byte)

Paris green is a color that ranges from pale and vivid blue green to deeper true green. It comes from the inorganic compound copper (II) acetoarsenite and was once a popular pigment in artists' paints.

=== Spanish green ===
Spanish green

Color coordinates
- Hex triplet: #009150
- sRGB^{B} (r, g, b): (0, 145, 80)
- HSV (h, s, v): (153°, 100%, 57%)
- CIELCh_{uv} (L, C, h): (53, 61, 140°)
- Source: Gallego and Sanz
- ISCC–NBS descriptor: Strong yellowish green
- B: Normalized to [0–255] (byte)

Spanish green is the color that is called "verde" (the Spanish word for "green") in the Guía de coloraciones (Guide to colorations) by Rosa Gallego and Juan Carlos Sanz, a color dictionary published in 2005 that is widely popular in the Hispanophone realm.

=== UNT green ===
UNT green

Color coordinates
- Hex triplet: #00853E
- sRGB^{B} (r, g, b): (0, 133, 62)
- HSV (h, s, v): (148°, 100%, 52%)
- CIELCh_{uv} (L, C, h): (48, 60, 136°)
- Source: University of North Texas Identity Guide
- B: Normalized to [0–255] (byte)

UNT green is one of three official colors used by the University of North Texas. It is the primary color that appears on branding and promotional material produced by and on behalf of the university.

=== UP forest green ===
UP forest green

Color coordinates
- Hex triplet: #014421
- sRGB^{B} (r, g, b): (1, 68, 33)
- HSV (h, s, v): (149°, 99%, 27%)
- CIELCh_{uv} (L, C, h): (24, 29, 139°)
- Source: University of the Philippines
- ISCC–NBS descriptor: Very dark yellowish green
- B: Normalized to [0–255] (byte)

Adjacent is one of the official colors used by the University of the Philippines, designated as "UP forest green". It is based on the approved color specifications to be used for the seal of the university.

=== Hooker's green ===
Hooker's green

Color coordinates
- Hex triplet: #49796B
- sRGB^{B} (r, g, b): (73, 121, 107)
- HSV (h, s, v): (162°, 40%, 47%)
- CIELCh_{uv} (L, C, h): (47, 23, 164°)
- Source: Winsor & Newton
- ISCC–NBS descriptor: Moderate green
- B: Normalized to [0–255] (byte)

Hooker's green is a dark green color created by mixing Prussian blue and gamboge. It is displayed adjacent. Hooker's green takes its name from botanical artist William Hooker (1779–1832) who first created it particularly for illustrating leaves.

== See also ==
- List of colors
