= Isfahan University of Medical Sciences =

University in Isfahan, Iran

Coordinates: 32°36′51″N 51°39′42″E

- دانشگاه علوم پزشکی و خدمات بهداشتی درمانی اصفهان
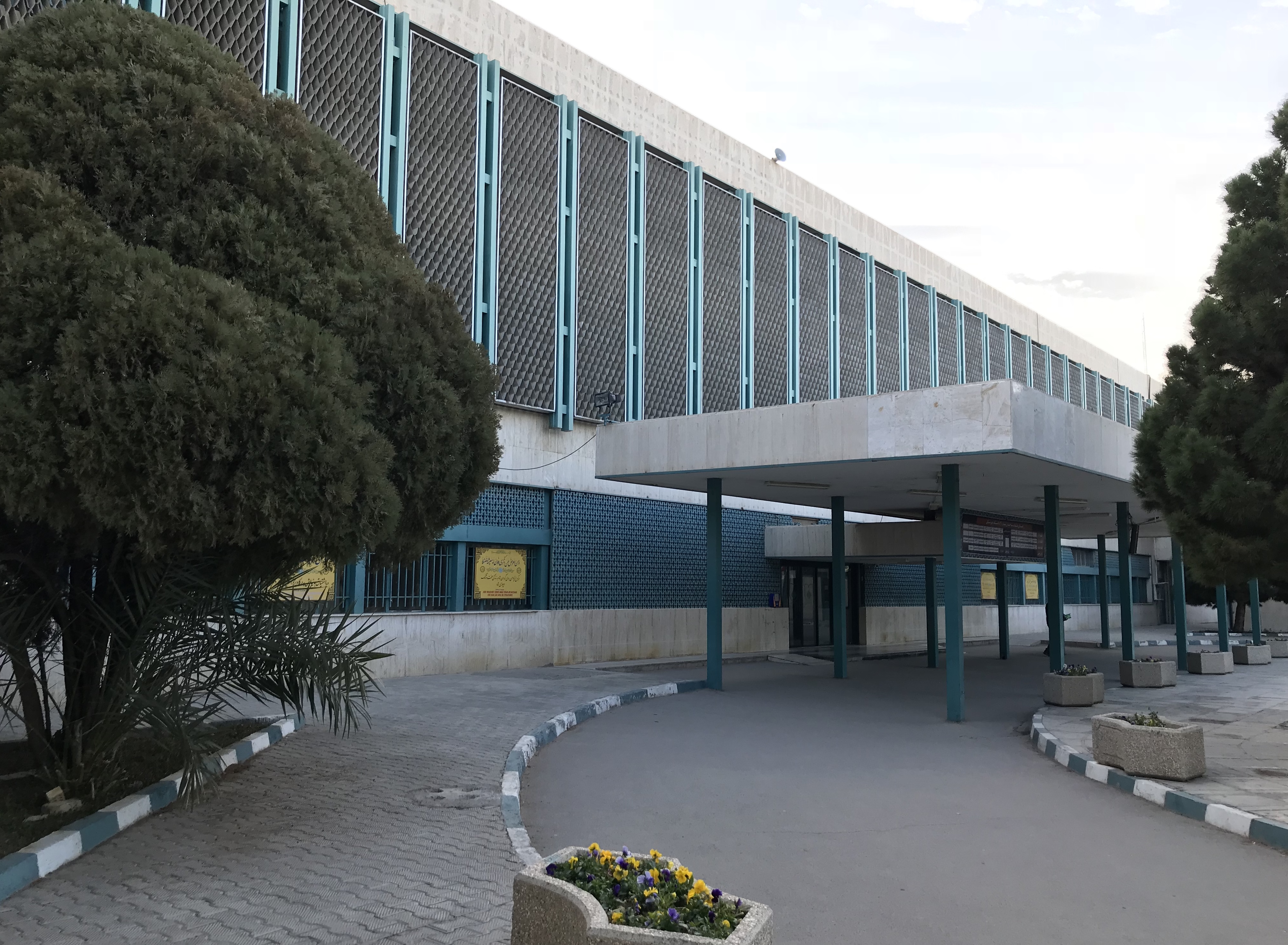
- Motto: دانشگاهی پیشرو، جامعه ای سالم، ایرانی پایدار
- Motto in English: "A Leading University, a Healthy Society, a Sustainable Iran"
- Type: Public
- Established: 1946
- President: Shahin Shirani
- Faculty: 939
- Students: 10000
- Location: Isfahan, Iran
- Campus: Urban
- Colours: Persian green
- Website: www.mui.ac.ir

Isfahan University of Medical Sciences also known as Medical University of Isfahan (MUI) (Persian: دانشگاه علوم پزشکی و خدمات بهداشتی درمانی اصفهان, Daneshgah-e Olum-e Pezeshki vâ Xadâmat-e Behdashti Dârmani-ye Esfehan) is a university specializing in basic medical sciences, clinical science, and health services, located in Isfahan, Iran.

Isfahan University of Medical Sciences, established in 1946, traces its origins to a historical medical institution founded in Isfahan in 1024/1025 by the renowned physician Avicenna.

Isfahan University of Medical Sciences provides undergraduate, graduate and postgraduate programs in 10 faculties and 75 main departments. The student body consists of about 10,000 students from all 31 provinces of Iran and some foreign countries. Funding for Isfahan University of Medical Sciences is provided by the government (via the ministry of health and medical education) and through some private investments.

== History ==
The first classes were held at the old Sa'di High School (now the Soureh Institute). On October 29, 1950, the first series of classes were held at the new campus, named the University of Isfahan.

The school was founded in 1946 as part of the University of Isfahan, initially offering a general physician program. Over the decades the university began offering programs in human sciences, engineering and medical sciences. In 1985, following the reorganization of Iran's higher medical education system, it became an independent entity under the newly established Isfahan University of Medical Sciences.

With 12 hospitals and 75 departments, the university is a regional health care provider and the main medical center in Isfahan Province and central Iran.

== Schools ==
- School of Health
- School of Nursing and Midwifery
- School of Medicine
- School of Nutrition & Food Sciences
- School of Pharmacy & Pharmaceutical Sciences
- School of Dentistry
- School of Rehabilitation Sciences
- School of Advanced Technologies in Medical Sciences
- School of Allied Medical Sciences
- School of Management & Medical Information Sciences

=== Medicine ===
Isfahan School of Medicine
- دانشکده پزشکی اصفهان
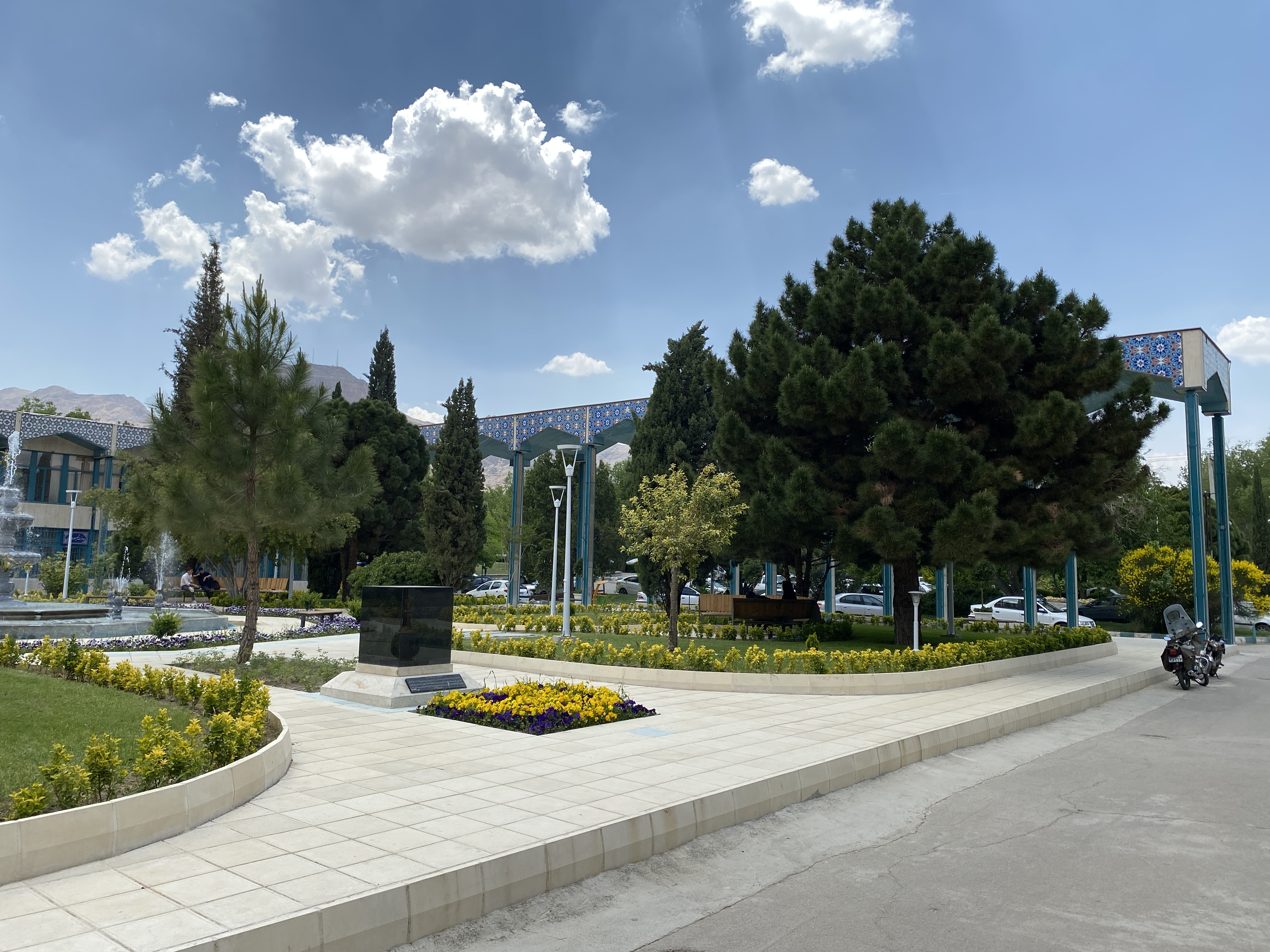
- Type: Public
- Established: 1946
- Parent institution: Isfahan University of Medical Sciences
- President: Bijan Iraj
- Provost: Mehrdad Zeinalian
- Faculty: 522
- Undergraduates: 2139
- Postgraduates: 1458
- Location: Isfahan, Iran
- Campus: Urban
- Colours: Persian green
- Website: www.med.mui.ac.ir

Isfahan Medical School (Persian: دانشکده پزشکی اصفهان) is one of the oldest and most prominent institutions of medical education in Iran. Established in 1946, it operates under the umbrella of Isfahan University of Medical Sciences, and has played an important role in training physicians, specialists, and medical researchers. The school is located in Isfahan, a historic city renowned for its scientific and cultural heritage. The academic body consists of 522 academic staff Bijan Iraj is the current dean of Isfahan medical school.

==== Faculty building and architecture ====
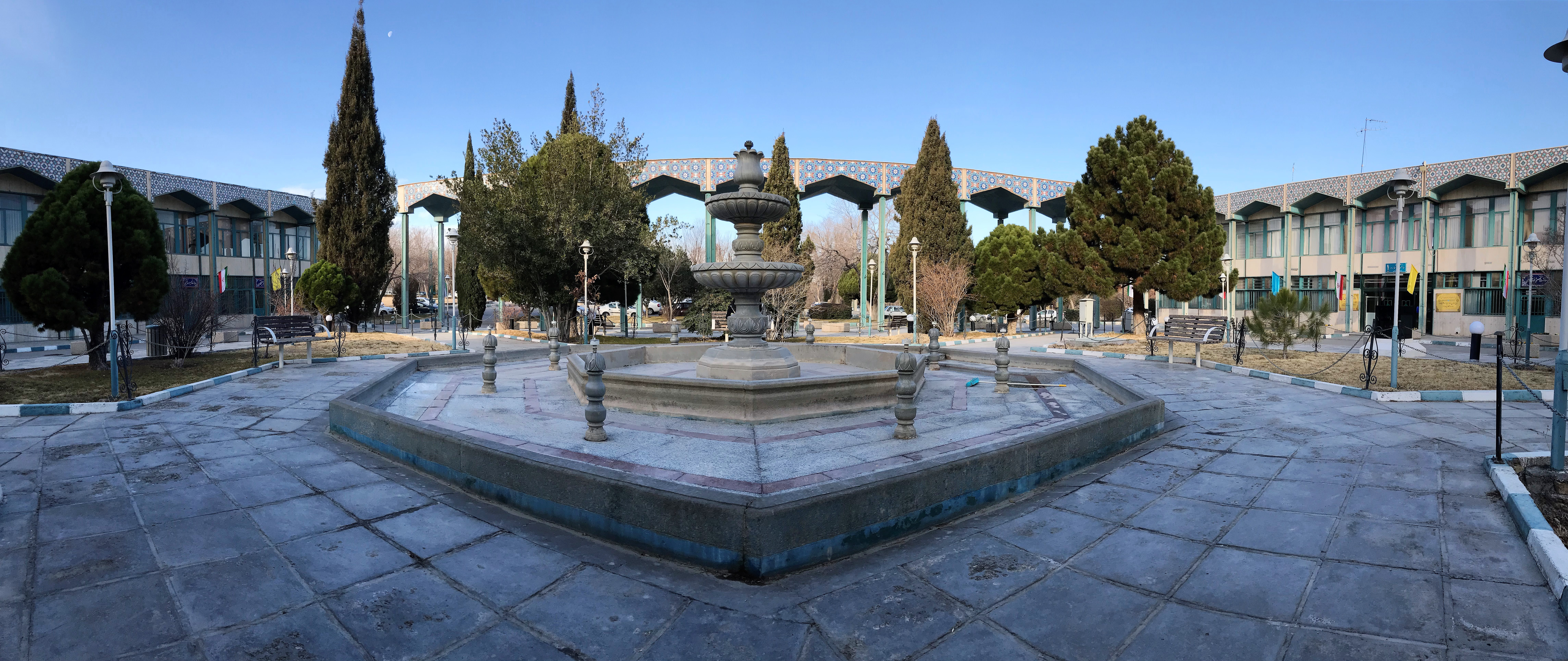
Main campus

The Medical School building spans a total floor area of 27,000 square meters and is constructed across three floors. The walls of the faculty are painted in Persian green, a color emblematic of traditional Persian architecture. The School of Paramedical Sciences is also housed within the building.

==== Academic Programs ====
The school offers a range of undergraduate and postgraduate programs, including:

- Doctorate in Medicine (MD): A seven-year program combining basic sciences, clinical training, and internships.
- Specialized Residency Programs: Training in fields such as internal medicine, surgery, pediatrics, neurology, ophthalmology, orthopedics surgery, urology, and radiology.
- Subspecialty Fellowship programs: Training in subspecial fields including nephrology, cardiology, gastroenterology, subspecialty surgical, ophthalmic, neurology, and pediatrics fellowships.
- PhD Programs: Research-focused degrees in medical specialties like anatomy, physiology, and biochemistry.
- Continuing Medical education (CME): Workshops and courses for healthcare professionals.

== Research ==
International cooperation with partners is of special importance.

== MUI Journals ==
Isfahan University of Medical Sciences (IUMS) publishes 14 peer reviewed journals in different fields of basic and clinical, medical and paramedical sciences.

== Hospitals ==
MUI governs 39 training hospitals which provide health services for the people of Isfahan province and also neighboring provinces. Students, Externs, interns and residents are trained in these hospitals by attending faculty of MUI training hospitals.

The medical school oversees training at major teaching hospitals, including:

- Al-Zahra Hospital: A tertiary referral hospital with advanced facilities.
- Kashani Hospital: Specializing in trauma management, neurosurgery, orthopedic surgery, and subspecialty care.
- Seyed Al-Shohada (Omid) Hospital: Focused on hemato-oncology services.
- Imam-Hossein pediatric hospital: Specialized in pediatric care.
- Khorshid Hospital: Offering subspecialized internal medicine care.
- Amin Hospital: focused on general and subspecialty surgery training, along with trauma management.

== See also ==
- Education in Iran
- Higher Education in Iran
- International rankings of Iran
- Science and technology in Iran
- List of universities in Iran
- List of medical schools in the Middle East
- List of Iranian scientists and scholars
- Ministry of Health and Medical Education
- Health care in Iran
