= Persian green =

Color

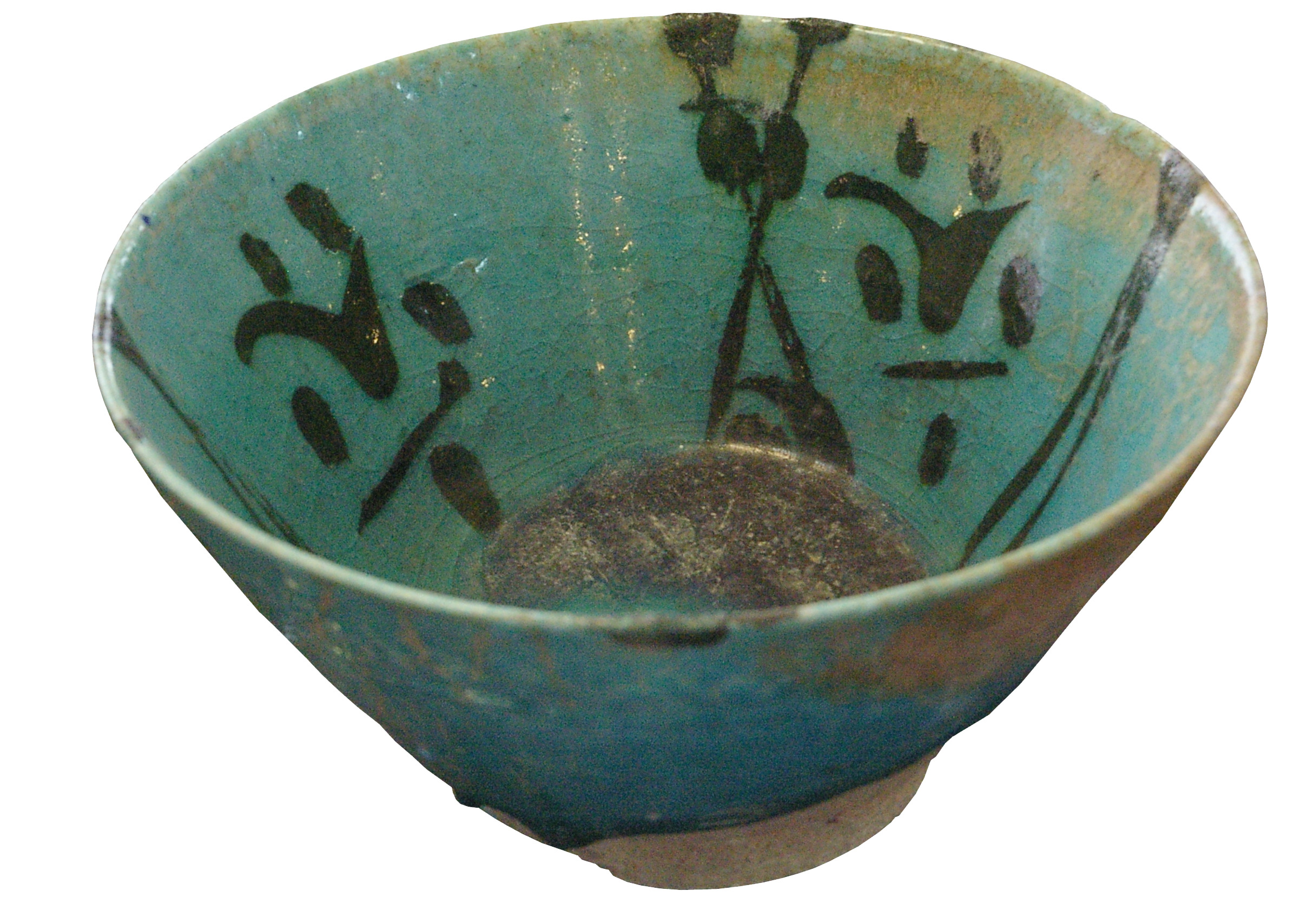
- 13th century Gorgan ceramic

Color coordinates
- Hex triplet: #00A693
- sRGB^{B} (r, g, b): (0, 166, 147)
- HSV (h, s, v): (173°, 100%, 65%)
- CIELCh_{uv} (L, C, h): (61, 50, 174°)
- Source: ISCC-NBS
- ISCC–NBS descriptor: Brilliant bluish green
- B: Normalized to [0–255] (byte)

Persian green is a color used in pottery and Persian carpets in Iran. It is also utilized in the architecture of religious places.

Other colors associated with Persia include Persian pink, Persian rose, Persian orange, Persian red and Persian blue.

The color Persian green is named from the green color of some Persian pottery and is a representation of the color of the mineral malachite. It is a popular color in Iran because the color green symbolizes gardens, nature, heaven, and sanctity. The first recorded use of Persian green as a color name in English was in 1891, due to Persian traditional architecture.
