= Persian red =

Color

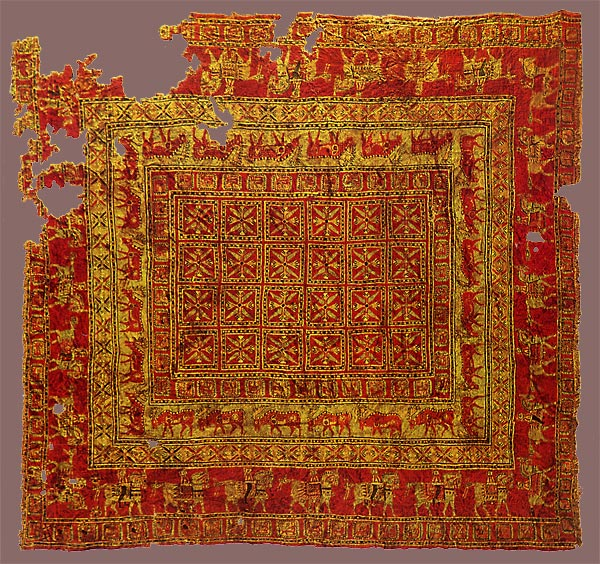

Color coordinates
- Hex triplet: #CC3333
- sRGB^{B} (r, g, b): (204, 51, 51)
- HSV (h, s, v): (0°, 75%, 80%)
- CIELCh_{uv} (L, C, h): (46, 119, 12°)
- Source: ColorHexa
- ISCC–NBS descriptor: Vivid red
- B: Normalized to [0–255] (byte)

Persian red is a deep reddish orange earth or pigment from the Persian Gulf composed of a silicate of iron and alumina, with magnesia. It is also called artificial vermillion.

The first recorded use of Persian red as a color name in English was in 1895.

Other colors associated with Persia include Persian pink, Persian rose, Persian orange, Persian blue and Persian green.

== In human culture ==
Architecture

- Henry Hobson Richardson insisted upon a ground of Persian red for the murals John LaFarge executed lining the interior of Trinity Church, Boston.

Agricultural Equipment

• Allis-Chalmers and its successor, AGCO, used Persian orange as the color of their tractors manufactured starting with Allis-Chalmers Model U. Allis-Chalmers updated the Persian orange color with the introduction of its 100 series. The color was phased out when Allis-Chalmers sold its agricultural division to form Deutz-Allis, but the color was brought back with the management buyout to form AGCO. The color was abandoned when AGCO stopped producing its own brand of tractors.

== See also ==
- List of inorganic pigments
