= Persian blue =

Blue colour associated with Persian pottery

Persian Blue
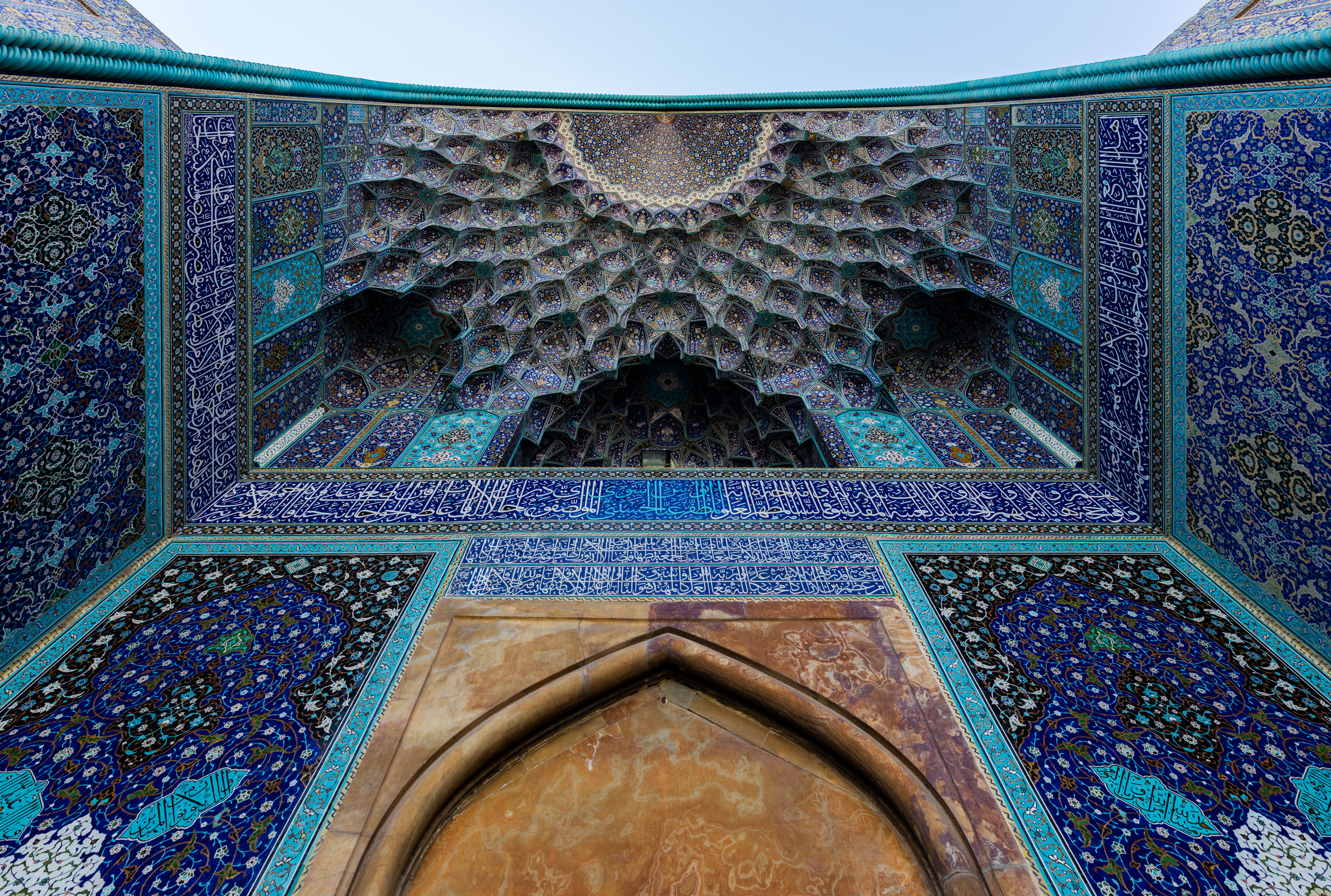

Common connotations
- Lapis lazuli; Celestial sphere; Heaven

Color coordinates
- Hex triplet: #1C39BB
- sRGB^{B} (r, g, b): (28, 57, 187)
- HSV (h, s, v): (229°, 85%, 73%)
- CIELCh_{uv} (L, C, h): (31, 94, 263°)
- Source: and Maerz and Paul
- ISCC–NBS descriptor: Vivid blue
- B: Normalized to [0–255] (byte)

Persian blue comes in three major tones: Persian blue proper: a bright medium blue; medium Persian blue (a medium slightly grayish blue that is slightly indigoish); and a kind of dark blue which is referred to as Persian indigo, dark Persian blue, or regimental, that is much closer to the web color indigo.

Other colors associated with Persia include Persian pink, Persian rose, Persian red, Persian orange and Persian green.

== Persian blue ==
The color Persian blue is named from the blue color of some Persian pottery and the color of tiles used in and on mosques and palaces in Iran and in other places in the Middle East. Persian blue is a representation of the color of the mineral lapis lazuli which comes from Persia and Afghanistan. The color azure is also named after the mineral lapis lazuli.

The first recorded use of Persian blue as a color name in English was in 1669.

== Variations ==
=== Medium Persian blue ===
Medium Persian Blue

Color coordinates
- Hex triplet: #0067A5
- sRGB^{B} (r, g, b): (0, 103, 165)
- HSV (h, s, v): (203°, 100%, 65%)
- CIELCh_{uv} (L, C, h): (42, 64, 246°)
- Source: ISCC-NBS
- ISCC–NBS descriptor: Strong blue
- B: Normalized to [0–255] (byte)

The medium tone of Persian blue shown at right is the color called Persian blue in color sample #178 of the ISCC-NBS color list.

=== Persian indigo ===
Persian Indigo

Color coordinates
- Hex triplet: #32127A
- sRGB^{B} (r, g, b): (50, 18, 122)
- HSV (h, s, v): (258°, 85%, 48%)
- CIELCh_{uv} (L, C, h): (18, 56, 272°)
- Source: 99colors.net/Maerz and Paul
- ISCC–NBS descriptor: Vivid purplish blue
- B: Normalized to [0–255] (byte)

The color Persian indigo is displayed at right. Another name for this color is regimental because in the 19th century it was commonly used by many nations for navy uniforms, though it is seldom used in modern times.

Persian indigo is named for an association with a product from Persia: Persian cloth dyed with indigo.

The first recorded use of regimental (the original name for the color now called Persian indigo) as a color name in English was in 1912.

== In human culture ==
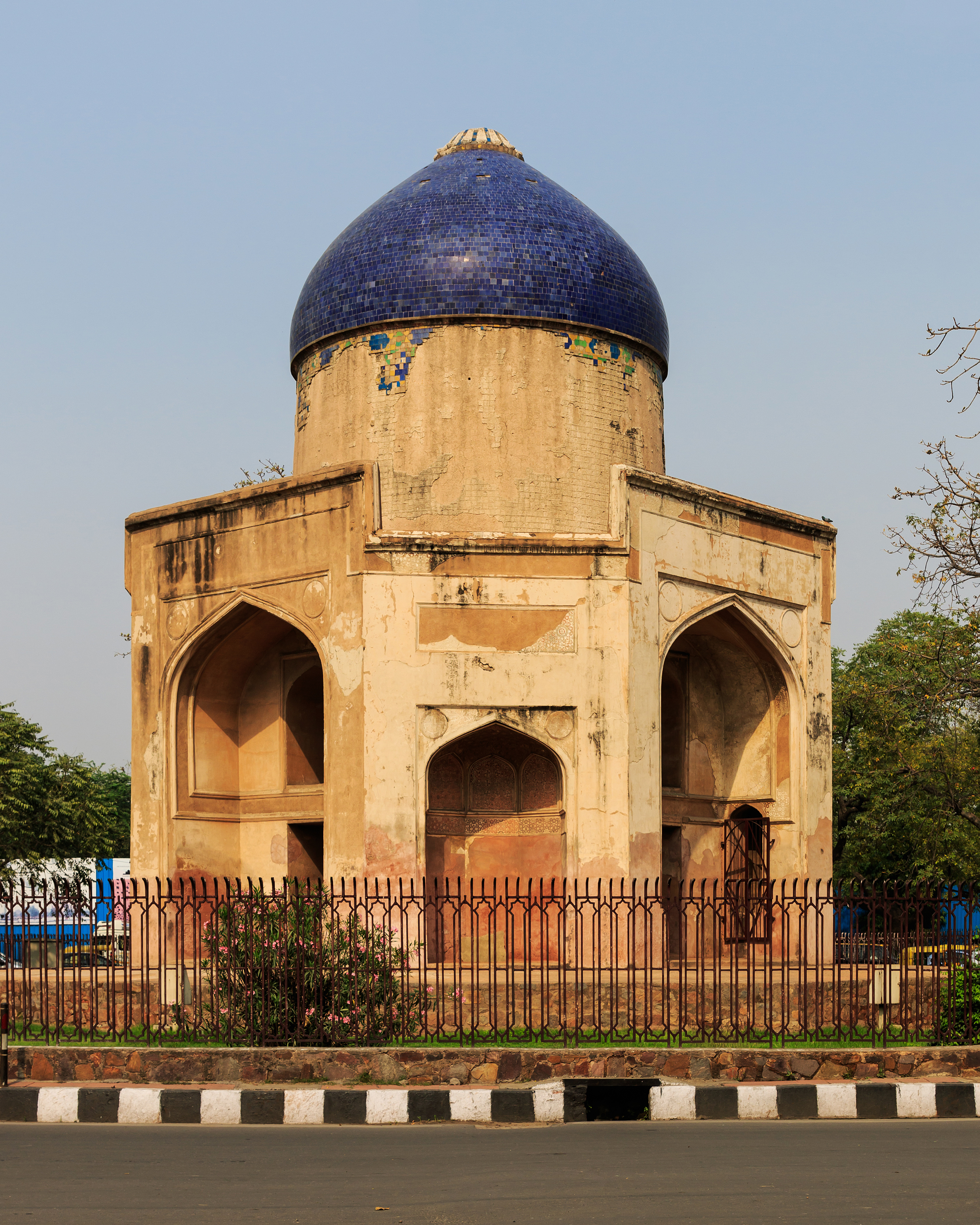
This Persian-influenced dome in Delhi, India has Persian-blue colored tiles on its outer surface.

Architecture

- Many mosques in Iran, such as the enormous Shah Mosque in Isfahan, have interiors that are faced with tiles that are Persian blue or close variations of it.

Military

- The color Persian indigo, which as noted above was originally called regimental, was called by that name because it used to be the color of the navy uniforms of a number of different nations in the late 19th and early 20th centuries due to the fact that it was easy and inexpensive to use indigo dye to dye navy uniforms.

New Age Metaphysics

- New Age Prophetess Alice A. Bailey wrote metaphysical books on topics such as the seven rays and said she channeled the information from the ascended master Djwal Khul, and these were published by the Lucis Trust and called by her followers the Alice A. Bailey material, and were originally bound in matte medium Persian blue in earlier editions up to and including the 1970s, and bound in glossy Persian blue since the 1980s.

Persian carpets

- When blue Persian carpets are produced in Iran, medium Persian blue is one of the most commonly used tones of blue.
