= Second Karzai cabinet =

Second cabinet of Hamid Karzai

- Date formed: 19 November 2009
- Date dissolved: 29 September 2014

People and organisations
- Head of state: Hamid Karzai
- Head of government: Hamid Karzai
- No. of ministers: 25
- Total no. of members: 25

History
- Predecessor: First Karzai cabinet
- Successor: Ghani cabinet

The second Karzai cabinet was the cabinet of Afghanistan that led the government from the re-election of president Hamid Karzai in 2009 until the end of his term in 2014. The cabinet consisted of the president, his two vice-presidents, 18 ministers who received approval from the Afghan Parliament, and 7 acting ministers who have not been approved.

== First list of candidates ==
Under the Afghan constitution the president nominates the ministers, but the Lower House of Parliament needs to approve them. After the fraud-plagued re-election of Karzai in the fall of 2009 and after reports about widespread corruption in the highest circles of the government, Karzai desperately needed to restore his legitimacy at home and abroad. During his inauguration speech, Karzai pledged to "end the culture of impunity and violation of law and bring to justice those involved in spreading corruption and abuse" and make it "obligatory for senior government officials to identify the sources of their assets and to declare their properties in a transparent manner". Western officials publicly said his lineup of minister candidates would be a first vital test to show whether he was serious about combating corruption, which undermined his government's credibility and fed the Taliban insurgency.

So Karzai was under pressure to exclude ineffective or corrupt officials, but at the same time powerful Afghans who helped deliver his re-election were promised or demanding positions, including the Uzbek warlord, Abdul Rashid Dostum.

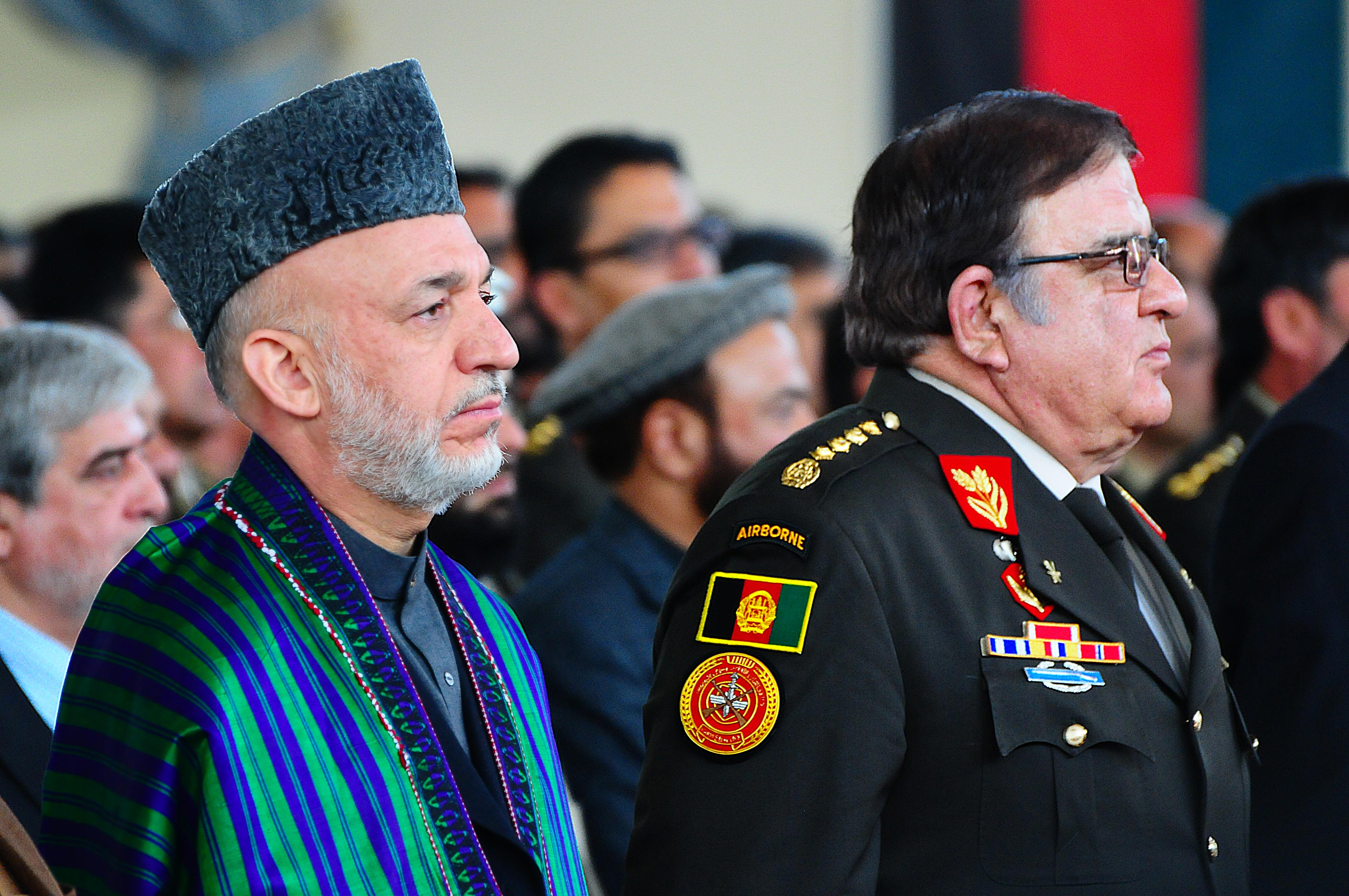
Afghan President Hamid Karzai and Abdul Rahim Wardak, the Defense Minister of Afghanistan.

=== Renaming incumbent ministers ===
On 19 December 2009 Karzai presented his list of 25 proposed cabinet members. There was no candidate named for the position of Foreign Minister, since Karzai wanted to keep to disputed foreign minister Rangin Dadfar Spanta until the International Conference on Afghanistan in London on 28 January 2010. Furthermore, Karzai retained the heads of high-profile ministries of Defense and Interior, who were regarded in Washington as experienced professionals. The finance, justice, education, water and energy, women's affairs, agriculture, counter-narcotics and telecommunication ministers were renamed. The most important portfolios were given a U.S. approval by Secretary of State Hillary Rodham Clinton, when she attended Karzai's inauguration in November 2009.

=== Influence of power-brokers ===
Although only one warlord, Ismail Khan, was offered a cabinet position, the list proposed by Karzai mirrored the fact that he had to give in to demands of the main power-brokers that had helped him secure his re-election. The newly appointed minister of Haj, Enayatullah Baleegh, is a senior member of the Ettehad-e Islami of Abdul Rasul Sayyaf; the proposed minister of Public Welfare, Mirza Husain Abdullahi, is an ally of Mohammad Mohaqeq, as is the candidate for the ministry of commerce, Ghulam Mohamad Eylaghi. Vice-president Mohammad Fahim has two loyals on the list with the nomination of Wais Barmak and Enayatullah Nazari, as has vice-president Karim Khalili with the renomination of Sarwar Danish and General Khodaidad. Pir Seyyed Gailani is represented by the nomination of his son, Seyyed Hamed Gailani, as Minister of Border and Tribal Affairs. Seyyed Mohammad Amin Fatemi, the incumbent minister for public health, is affiliated with the Nejat-e Melli of Sibghatullah Mojaddedi. Finally, the Jombesh-e Melli, of strongman Abdul Rashid Dostum has two high-ranking members on the list with the deputy head of the party, Mohammad Ismail Munshi, named as Minister of Labour and Social Affairs and Dr. Mohammadullah Batash, a former Secretary of the Jombesh General Council as Minister of Transport and Civil Aviation.

=== Dual citizenship ===
Shortly before Karzai presented his list of nominees, the Wolesi Jirga, the Lower House of the Afghan Parliament, after three days of debating, decided against giving trust vote to ministers with dual citizenship. However, Karzai's appointee for Minister of Finance, Dr. Hazrat Omar Zakhilwal, also holds the Canadian citizenship. In the end the parliament dropped the issue and voted upon Zakhilwal's candidacy.

=== Controversy and new ministries ===
By presenting his list of candidates, Karzai asked the parliament to create a new Ministry for Martyred and Disabled Affairs, for which he named Taj Ali Saber, a member of the Khost Provincial council, as minister. The Parliament however didn't agree and voted only upon the candidacy of Munshi as minister of Labour, Social Affairs and Disabled.

Karzai received harsh criticism for only including one woman, Husna Banu Ghazanfar, in his team. Furthermore, the incumbent minister of Women's Affairs was considered weak. So on 23 December, at a news conference with the Belgian prime minister Leterme, he announced that he planned to create from part of the ministry of education a "ministry to fight illiteracy", and that he intended to nominate a woman to head it. Female politicians would also be appointed to preside several independent commissions and deputy minister's posts.

The same day Karzai changed the candidacy of Gul Agha Sherzai, initially mentioned as Minister of Reconstruction, into the candidacy of incumbent minister Yusuf Pashtun. Wazhma Zurmati was named as Minister of Illiteracy, but just like the new ministry of the Martyrs and Disabled, the parliament didn't agree with its creation and didn't vote upon her candidacy. The parliament also didn't vote upon the candidacy of Anwar Jegdelek, a former mayor of Kabul, as minister of Parliamentary affairs. Since this ministry is designed to merely coordinate the relations of Parliament with the other pillars of the State, this is not a position that requires parliamentary approval.

=== Voting on the first list of candidates ===
The Wolesi Jirga or Lower House of the Afghan parliament voted on the list on 2 January. Since the session was attended by 232 of the 249 Parliamentary members, 117 votes (50%+1) were necessary for acceptance. But a crisis emerged, when the count of the votes made clear that the parliament had rejected two-thirds of the nominated persons. Of the 24 nominees, only seven were accepted. The rules of the wolesi jirga prevented nominees from being put forward again and since the parliament was scheduled to begin a 45-day winter vacation 3 days later, it seemed that Karzai would have to go into the international conference of Afghanistan with a largely incomplete cabinet. But On 4 January, Karzai requested the parliament to delay its winter recess, so members could consider a new list of nominees. The parliament decided to take a short break of three days and demanded Karzai to come up with a list of names, including a candidate for the post of Foreign Affairs.

=== Accepted candidates ===
Of the seven candidates that were approved by the parliament, five were incumbent ministers who had been nominated for the same post. The other two approved ministers, Wahidullah Shahrani and Sayed Makhdum Raheen, were respectively an incumbent minister on another post and a former minister. Seven other incumbent ministers were rejected, most notable the only woman on the list, Hosn Banu Ghazanfar, and the powerful warlord Ismail Khan.

Ministry	Name candidate	Previous Function	Approved/Rejected	Aye	Nay	Abstain	Invalid
Foreign Minister	not named						
Defense Minister	Abdul Rahim Wardak	Defence Minister	approved	124	100	8	
Interior Minister	Mohammad Hanif Atmar	Interior Minister	approved	147	77		8
Finance Minister	Hazrat Omar Zakhilwal	Finance Minister	approved	141	84	6	
Economic Minister	Anwarul Haq Ahadi	Presidential Candidate	rejected	91	103	7	3
Justice Minister	Mohammad Sarwar Danish	Justice Minister	rejected				
Information and Cultural Affairs Minister	Dr. Sayed Makhdoom Raheen	Ambassador to Idia	approved	120	93	14	4
Education Minister	Ghulam Farooq Wardak	Education Minister	approved	155	73	3	
Higher Education Minister	Dr. Obaidullah Obaid	dean of Kabul Medical University	rejected	94	121	12	5
Trade and Commerce Minister	Ghulam Muhammad Eeilaqi	Acting Director of the Chambre of Commerce	rejected	76	138	13	4
Water and Energy Minister	Ismail Khan	Water and Energy Minister	rejected	111	109	5	5
Transportation and Aviation Minister	Mohammadullah Batash	Adviser to the Independent Directorate of Local Governance	rejected	82	138	10	3
Women's Affairs Minister	Hosn Bano Ghazanfar	Women's Affairs Minister	rejected	115	108	8	1
Haj and Islamic Affairs Minister	Enayatullah Baligh	lecturer Sharia Law at Kabul University	rejected	108	115	6	2
Public Welfare Minister	Mirza Hussain Abullahi	Director of Civil Service Reform in the Civil Service Commission	rejected	33	179	17	2
Public Health Minister	Syed Mohammad Amin Fatimi	Minister of Public Health	rejected	102	120	5	3
Agriculture Minister	Mohammad Asif Rahimi	Agriculture Minister	approved	136	89	3	2
Mines Minister	Wahidullah Shahrani	Commerce minister	approved	140	78	13	1
Telecommunications Minister	Amirzai Sangin	Telecommunications minister	rejected	92	130	8	1
Rural Rehabilitation and Development Minister	Eng. Owais Ahmad Barmak	Deputy Minister of Rural Rehabilitation and Development	rejected	90	127	4	9
Labour and Social Affairs Minister	Mohammad Ismail Monshi	Adviser to the Independent Directorate of Local Governance	rejected	39	176	14	2
Border Affairs and Tribal Affairs Minister	Sayed Hamed Gilani	Deputy Speaker of the Meshrano Jirga	rejected	70	149	11	2
Reconstruction Minister	Engineer Mohammad Yousuf Pashtun	Urban Reconstruction Minister	rejected	88	127	15	1
Counter Narcotics Minister	General Khodaidad	Counter-Narcotics Minister	rejected	36	176	17	3
Refugees and Returnees Minister	Enayatullah Nazari	Former Minister of Refugees	rejected	82	133	11	3
Martyrs and Disabled Minister	Taj Ali Saber	Lecturer at Khost University	not voted upon				
Literacy Minister	Wazhma Zurmati		not voted upon				
Minister of Parliamentary Affairs	Anwar Jegdelek	Head of the National Olympic Committee	does not need the vote of confidence				

== Second list of Candidates ==
After only seven candidates from the first list were formally named minister, on 9 January 2010, Second Vice-president Karim Khalili read out a second list of 16 nominees to the parliament. None of the rejected ministers were on this list. This time, a candidate for the foreign ministry had been named, by putting forward the candidacy of Zalmai Rassoul, then the head of the national security agency. However, two other posts - that of the minister for communications and for water and energy - were left vacant. For those two postings the incumbent ministers, Amirzai Sangeen and Ismail Khan, had been rejected in the first round of voting.

=== Candidates ===
Since no women had been approved in the first round and Karzai had faced criticism for not including enough women in his team, this second list contained the names of three female candidates: Amina Afzali for Social Affairs, Suraya Dalil for Public Health and Palwasha Hassan for Women's Affairs.

Zaraar Ahmad Moqbel was named as anti-narcotics minister. He had been Afghanistan's interior minister in 2008 and early 2009 but was removed from that post by Karzai under pressure from the UN special representative in Afghanistan, Kai Eide.

In a later state, before the vote, the list was expanded with a seventeenth candidate, Abdul Qodus Hamidi for the post of Telecommunications.

=== Criticism ===
There was also harsh criticism of this second list. While most comments on the first list were aimed at suspected links of candidates to warlords, this time lawmakers complained that many on the list lacked the experience needed to take on cabinet posts. According to Wolesi Jirga member Fawzai Kofi, "this list is much weaker than the previous one."

=== Voting ===
Parliament again confirmed seven ministers, bringing the total to fourteen, leaving 11 ministriess without an approved minister. Among the confirmed ministers was Zarar Moqbel, a prominent leader of the Jamiat-e Islami who had received harsh allegations of corruption and unsavoury appointments during his tenure as Minister of Interior. However, he played an important role in Karzai's re-election campaign and is said to have played the game of patronage and payoffs well. He received the large number of 161 votes of confidence.

Arsala Jamal had a similar story. He had to leave his post of Governor of Khost due to allegations of corruption and also served as member of Karzai's re-election campaign team. He, however, is allied with the Hezb-e Islami and was not confirmed by parliament.

The only woman that was appointed is Amina Afzali, a former Minister of Youth and affiliated with the Jamiat-e Islami. Palwasha Hassan and Suraya Dalil, the other two female candidates who had extensive careers in Afghan NGOs, were both rejected.

With Zalmai Rassoul confirmed, Afghanistan received a new and Minister of Foreign Affairs, who was close to Karzai, just before the start of the important London Conference. Rassoul also had good connections with the former royal family of king Zahir Shah. That was also the case for Habibullah Ghaleb, a member of the Afghan National Liberation Front of former president Sibghatullah Mojaddedi, who was confirmed as Minister of Justice.

Engineer Abdul Rahim, a senior member of the Jamiat-e Islami and close associate to former President Burhanuddin Rabbani did not receive enough votes to become the minister of refugees. His nephew, Jarullah Mansouri, also a member of Jamiat but said to be closer to Vice-president Mohammad Faheem, did however gather enough votes and was approved as minister of Rural Rehabilitation and Development.

Dr Yusuf Niazi became the new Minister of Haj, and the leader of the (officially registered branch of) Hezb-e Islami, Abdul Hadi Arghandiwal, was confirmed as Minister of Economy.

Ministry	Name candidate	Previous Function	Appointed/Rejected	Aye	Nay	Abstain	Invalid
Foreign Minister	Zalmai Rasoul	National security advisor	approved	132	82	0	0
Economic Minister	Abdul Hadi Arghandiwal	leader of the Hezb-i Islami faction in Kabul	approved	120	94	6	2
Justice Minister	Habibullah Ghaleb	Chairman of the Legal Consultative Board to the president of Afghanistan	approved	115	99	8	1
Higher Education Minister	Mohammad Hashim Esmatullahi	lecturer at the Journalism Department of Kabul University and head of the Union of Afghan Journalists	rejected	100	108	12	2
Trade and Commerce Minister	Zahir Waheed	worked for the ministries of Public Works, Mines, Commerce, Higher Education, the National Bank, AISA (Afghanistan Investment Support Agency) and Oxfam	rejected	69	127	12	3
Water and Energy Minister	No name put forward						
Transportation and Aviation Minister	Abdul Rahim Horas	acting head of Third Political Division at the Foreign Ministry	rejected	87	123	12	1
Women's Affairs Minister	Pelwasha Hassan	project coordinator and consultant of the Center for Human Rights and Democratic Development	rejected	56	150	15	4
Haj and Islamic Affairs Minister	Mohammad Yasouf Neyazi	adviser to the Ministry of Education	approved	132	80	10	1
Public Welfare Minister	Mohammad Bashir Lali	Engineer in the United States	rejected	78	129	15	1
Public Health Minister	Suraya Dalil	Chief of the Health and Nutrition Program of UNICEF/Somalia	rejected	86	116	17	3
Telecommunications Minister	Abdul Qadus Hamidi	deputy minister of Sectoral Affairs	rejected	105	104	14	0
Rural Rehabilitation and Development Minister	Jarullah Mansouri	deputy head of the Environmental Agency	approved	113	102	6	1
Labour, Social Affairs, Martyres and Disabled Minister	Amina Afzali	President of the Government High Commission for Children and Youth and Boardmember of the Red Crescent Society	approved	117	94	10	1
Border Affairs and Tribal Affairs Minister	Arsala Jamal	active member of President Karzai's election campaign team	rejected	94	116	10	3
Reconstruction Minister	Sultan Hussain Nasery	active as a lecturer and an architect	rejected	80	128	12	3
Counter Narcotics Minister	Zarar Ahmad Moqbel	former Minister of Interior and head of Karzai's re-election campaign in Parwan	approved	161	56	4	1
Refugees and Returnees Minister	Abdul Rahim	adviser to the Ministry of Telecommunication	rejected	82	128	15	0

=== Aftermath: acting ministers ===
Karzai decided not to push for a third list before the international conference to fill the vacant positions, but instead to keep some of the candidates on as 'acting ministers' who were leading their ministry without official approval of Parliament. The following persons functioned as acting minister until at least July 2010.

Ministry	Name candidate	Previous Function	Rejected in voting round nr.
Higher Education Minister	Dr. Sarwar Danesh	Justice Minister	1
Trade and Commerce Minister	Dr. Ghulam Mohammad Eelaqi	Acting Director of the Chambre of Commerce	1
Water and Energy Minister	Mohammad Ismael Khan	Water and Energy Minister	1
Transportation and Aviation Minister	Mohammadulla Batash	Adviser to the Independent Directorate of Local Governance	1
Women's Affairs Minister	Mrs. Husn Banu Ghazanfar	Women's Affairs Minister	1
Public Welfare Minister	Dr. Sohrab Ali Saffary	Public Welfare Minister	never proposed
Public Health Minister	Dr. Suraya Dalill	Chief of the Health and Nutrition Program of UNICEF/Somalia	2
Telecommunications Minister	Amirzai Sangin	Telecommunications minister	1
Border Affairs and Tribal Affairs Minister	Arsala Jamal	Former Governor of Khost	2
Urban Reconstruction Minister	Sultan Hussain	Lecturer and architect	2
Refugees and Returnees Minister	Abdul Rahim	Adviser to the ministry of Telecommunication	2

== Third list of candidates ==
In June 2010, Interior Minister Hanif Atmar resigned following a Taliban attack on the national peace conference in Kabul together with Amrullah Saleh, the head of the National Directorate of Security (NDS). There was widespread speculation in Kabul that Atmar resigned because he disagreed with Karzai's plan to negotiate with the Taliban.

Since the Interior Ministry is an important post Karzai couldn't let this ministry be left vacant or run by an acting, not approved minister. Therefore, on 26 June 2010 he announced that he would present a third list of candidates to the Wolesi Jirga.

=== Candidates ===
This third list contained the names of seven candidate ministers. The other five ministries that still didn't have an approved minister are still run by their acting ministers. This third list included Anwarul Haq Ahadi, who had been rejected in January for the post of Ministry of Economic Affairs; Abdul Qadus Hamidi, who had been rejected for the post of Telecommunications Minister; and Sarwar Danish, who had been rejected for the post of Justice Minister and had been acting minister of Higher Education ever since.

General Bismullah Mohammadi, the Chief of Staff of the Afghan National Army, was named the new Interior Minister. The governor of Kandahar, Assadullah Khalid, was named Minister of Border and Tribal Affairs. Daud Ali Najafi, who oversaw Afghanistan's election commission during the flawed presidential elections of 2009, was on the list as Minister of Transport and Aviation.

=== Voting ===
Five of the seven candidates were approved by the Wolesi Jirga. Only Sarwar Danish and Daud Ali Najafi were rejected. Since then Karzai has kept Danish and Najafi as acting ministers.

Ministry	Name candidate	Previous Function	Appointed/Rejected	yes	no	abstain	invalid
Higher Education Minister	Sarwar Danish	Acting Minister of Higher Education	rejected	95	101	11	5
Interior Minister	General Bismullah Mohammadi	Chief of Staff of the Afghan National Army	approved	150	55	3	4
Trade and Commerce Minister	Anwarul Haq Ahadi	Leader of the Afghan Social Democratic Party (Afghan Mellat)	approved	147	57	5	3
Transportation and Aviation Minister	Daud Ali Najafi	Chief Electoral Officer of the Independent Election Commission of Afghanistan	rejected	87	106	14	5
Public Works Minister	Abdul Qadus Hamidi	Deputy Minister of Sectoral Affairs in Ministry of Mines	approved	160	45	4	3
Border Affairs and Tribal Affairs Minister	Assadullah Khalid	Governor of Kandahar Province	approved	140	62	8	2
Refugees and Returnees Minister	Jamahir Anwari	Head of Medicine Affairs at the General Directorate of Pharmacy in the Ministry of Public Health	approved	120	85	5	2

== Fourth list of candidates ==
In February 2012 the Lower House of the Parliament (Wolesi Jirga) once again criticized the government for not nominating the remaining cabinet members so that a vote of confidence could be taken in the Lower House. The MPs stated that they wouldn't approve next year's budget until President Karzai nominated the remaining Cabinet Ministers. On 15 February Karzai nominated candidates for the 7 remaining ministries that still had an acting minister as head, as well as new candidates for the ministries of Rural Development and Public Works. Previously, a cabinet pick could not be re-introduced for the same slot under the Wolesi Jirga rules. But the procedure was recently relaxed: since the candidates were rejected by the Wolesi Jirga before the elections, the president is now allowed to refer his previously rejected candidates to the new Wolesu Jirga. On the 5th of March, all 9 cabinet members received approval from the Wolesi Jirga.

Ministry	Name candidate	Previous Function	Appointed/Rejected	yes	no	blank	invalid
Higher Education Minister	Obaidullah Obaid	Ambassador to Iran	approved	199	22	13	4
Transportation and Aviation Minister	Daud Ali Najafi	Acting minister of Transportation	approved	179	41	15	5
Water and Energy Minister	Mohammad Ismail Khan	Acting minister of Water and Energy Minister	approved	175	35	19	11
Women's Affairs Minister	Husan Bano Ghazanfar	Acting Women's Affairs Minister	approved	191	34	13	2
Public Works Minister	Najibullah Awzhang		approved	207	17	12	4
Public Health Minister	Suraya Dalil	Acting minister of Health	approved	199	28	10	3
Telecommunications Minister	Amirzai Sangin	Acting Minister of Communication & Information Technology	approved	190	27	11	4
Urban Development Affairs Minister	Mirza Hassan Abdullahi		approved	207	22	7	4
Rural Rehabilitation and Development Minister	Wais Barmak	Deputy Rural Development Affairs minister	approved	212	9	9	5

== Changing the power ministries ==
On 4 August 2012, the Wolesi Jirga called Minister of Defence Abdul Rahim Wardak and Minister of Interior Bismillah Khan Muhammadi to a session of Parliament to answer for 'unacceptable passivity' with regard to the continued Pakistani cross-border shelling in Kunar province. The two ministers that were considered heavyweights in the cabinet were unable to answer questions to the satisfaction of the Parliament and lost a subsequent vote of confidence.

Since President Karzai had also sacked the head of the National Directorate of Security (NDS), in September 2012 he came up with a list of new names for three of the major power positions. The sacked Minister of Interior, General Bismillah Khan Muhammadi, was named as the new Minister of Defence. Ghulam Mujtaba Patang, Deputy Interior Minister and former policeman, was named as Interior Minister. Assadullah Khaled, then Minister of Border and Tribal Affairs, was named as the new head of the NDS. His candidacy was controversial, since he has a contested human rights record and has been accused of personally torturing prisoners. Haji Din Muhammad, former governor of Nangarhar and Kabul Province, and Karzai's 2009 campaign manager, was named as Minister of Tribes and Borders.

On August 15, 2012, the Wolesi Jirga voted on the candidates. Except for Haji Azizullah Din Mohammad, all candidates were accepted.

Ministry	Name candidate	Previous Function	Appointed/Rejected	Aye	Nay	Abstain	Invalid
Defence Minister	Bismillah Khan Muhammadi	Interior Minister	appointed	124	98	11	8
Interior Minister	Ghulam Mujataba Patang	Deputy Interior Minister	appointed	129	92	11	9
Borders and Tribal Affairs Minister	Haji Azizullah Din Mohammad	president's ministerial advisor on tribal affairs	rejected	117	108	8	8
Director of the National Directorate of Security	Assadullah Khaled	Border and Tribal Affairs Minister	appointed	143	78	11	9

Half a year later, in April 2013, the Wolesi Jirga again summoned ministers to answer for alleged mismanagement. Eleven ministers were summoned to parliament because the MPs believed, based on a report by the Supreme Audit Office, that they had spent less than half of the development budgets allocated to them. However, this charge turned out to be wrong, and after the deliberations, all eleven had received a vote of confidence. There was a great deal of politicking and alleged corruption in how the ministers managed to secure their votes.

== Pre-election cabinet reshuffles ==
In a sudden turn of events, in July 2013, the minister of interior, Mujtaba Patang, was voted out of office by Parliament. The MPs had summoned Patang several times during the last three months before to answer their questions, but he had always sent one of his deputies instead. Members of the Wolesi further criticized Patang for the deterioration of security on highways between Kabul and Bamyan and Kabul and Ghazni. The MPs also demanded answers regarding the charges of corruption that Patang had made against the MPs. In the end, 136 of the 205 MPs present voted against him.

However, President Karzai did not immediately accept the vote of no confidence. The president asked the Supreme Court to check the validity of the reasons given for the sacking. In the meantime, Patang continued as acting minister, until Karzai dropped him on 3 September 2013, before anything had come out of the Supreme Court.

Instead, Karzai named Muhammad Omar Daudzai as new Interior Minister. Daudzai had been chief of staff to Karzai and ambassador to Iran and then Pakistan and had declared his “possible” intention to run in the 2014 Presidential election. By accepting the new post as minister, Daudzai withdrew as a presidential candidate.

One day earlier, Karzai named Rahmatullah Nabil acting head of the Afghan Intelligence Service. The old intelligence chief, Assadullah Khaled, had been injured in a suicide attack in 2012. The ministers appeared for approval by the Wolesi Jirga together with Mohammad Akram Khpelwak, who was named as minister of Border en Tribal Affairs, since Karzai's previous choice, Haji Din Mohammad, had not won the vote of confidence and the ministry was left without a formally appointed head.

In October 2013, 27 Afghanis registered as presidential candidates, each with two candidates for vice presidents. In order to run for president or vice president, a number of ministers resigned. Foreign Affairs Minister Zalmay Rassul and Commerce Minister Anwar-ul-Haq Ahady registered as presidential candidates (although the candidacy of Ahady was rejected by the Independent Election Commission). Energy Minister Ismail Khan resigned to become first deputy to Ustad Sayyaf. Mines Minister Wahidullah Shahrani became first deputy to Qayyum Karzai.

Later that month, President Karzai named their successors. The controversial Counter-Narcotics minister Zarar Ahmad Moqbel Usmani was named as new Minister of Foreign Affairs. Ex-ministers Muhammad Aref Nurzai and Muhammad Shakir Kargar also gained seats in the cabinet, as did the relative newcomers Haji Akbar Barakzai and Din Muhammad Mubarez Rashedi.

=== Vote of confidence ===
Daudzai and Khpalwak were confirmed on 25 September 2013. The other five ministers were all approved on December 29, 2013.

Ministry	Former minister	New minister	Previous Function	Approved/rejected	Votes in favor	Votes against	Null votes
Minister of the Interior	Mujtaba Patang	Mohammad Omar Daudzai	Former ambassador to Pakistan	approved	153	55	5
Minister of Border and Tribal Affairs	Haji Din Mohammad	Akram Khpalwak	Governor of Farah	approved	132	69	4
Minister of Foreign Affairs	Zalmai Rassoul	Zarar Ahmad Moqbel Usmani	Minister of Counter-Narcotics	approved	173		
Minister of Water and Power	Ismail Khan	Muhammad Aref Nurzai	Former Deputy head of commission organising the 2011 consultative loya jirga	approved	177		
Minister of Mines and Petrolium	Wahidullah Shahrani	Haji Akbar Barakzai	Deputy Minister of Public Works	approved	164		
Minister of Commerce	Anwar-ul-Haq Ahady	Muhammad Shakir Kargar	Ambassador to Azerbaijan	approved	163		
Minister of Counter-Narcotics	Zarar Ahmad Moqbel Usmani	Mohammad Mubarez Rashedi	Deputy minister for publication at the ministry of information and culture	approved	166		

== Death of Fahim ==
In March 2014, at the age of 57, vice president Mohammad Fahim died of a heart attack, just a few months before his term would end. President Karzai nominated Yunus Qanuni to replace Fahim as first vice president. Qanuni was Minister of the Interior following the fall of the Taliban government in 2001 and subsequently Minister of Education in the Afghan Transitional Administration from 2002 until 2004. In 2004 Qanuni had run as presidential candidate against Karzai in the presidential election. In 2005 he had been elected to the Afghan Lower House and became speaker of the house. Like Fahim, Qanuni is an ethnic Tajik and has a background as leader of the Shura-e Nazar. On March 25, the nomination of Qanuni was unanimously approved by Parliament.

On 20 March, Justice Minister Habibullah Ghalib died, having suffered a brain hemorrhage.

Ministry	Former minister	New minister	Previous Function
First Vice-president	Marshal Muhammad Fahim	Yunus Qanooni	Former Speaker of the House

Preceded by First Karzai cabinet	Second Karzai cabinet 2009–2014	Succeeded by Ghani cabinet
