= Ghani cabinet =

- Date formed: 29 September 2014
- Date dissolved: 15 August 2021

People and organisations
- Head of state: Ashraf Ghani
- Head of government: Ashraf Ghani
- Total no. of members: 28

History
- Predecessor: Second Karzai cabinet
- Successor: Caretaker Cabinet of the Islamic Emirate

President Ashraf Ghani's cabinet was the cabinet of Afghanistan from 29 September 2014 until 15 August 2021.

== Cabinet ==
Portfolio	Name	Years	Status
President	Ashraf Ghani	2014-2021	Chosen by electorate
First Vice President	Abdul Rashid Dostum	2014-2020	Chosen by electorate
Second Vice President	Sarwar Danish	2014-2021	Chosen by electorate
Foreign Affairs Minister	Salahuddin Rabbani	2015-2021	Acting (First Approved by the National Assembly, but later Rejected by them)
National Defense Minister	Tariq Shah Bahrami	2017-2021	Approved by the National Assembly
Interior Affairs Minister	Wais Barmak	2017-2021	Approved by the National Assembly
Finance Minister	Eklil Ahmad Hakimi	2015-2021	Approved by the National Assembly
Economy Minister	Mohammad Mustafa Mastoor	2017-2021	Approved by the National Assembly
Agriculture Minister	Nasir Ahmad Durrani	2017-2021	Approved by the National Assembly
Energy and Water Minister	Ali Ahmad Osmani	2015-2021	Approved by the National Assembly
Justice Minister	Abdul Basir Anwar	2015-2021	Approved by the National Assembly
Information and Culture Minister	Abdul Bari Jahani	2015-2021	Approved by the National Assembly
Education Minister	Shinwari	2017-2021	Acting
Higher Education Minister	Najibullah Khwaja Omari	2017-2021	Approved by the National Assembly
Trade and Commerce Minister	Humayoon Rasaw	2015-2021	Approved by the National Assembly
Transportation and Aviation Minister	Muhammad Hamid Tahmasi	2017-2021	Approved by the National Assembly
Women's Affairs Minister	Delbar Nazari	2015-2021	Approved by the National Assembly
Haj and Religious Affairs Minister	Faiz Mohammad Osmani	2015-2021	Approved by the National Assembly
Public Health Minister	Ferozuddin Feroz	2015-2021	Approved by the National Assembly
Public Works Minister	Yama Yari	2017-2021	Approved by the National Assembly
Mines Minister	Nargis Nehan	2017-2021	Acting
Ministry of Communications and Information Technology	Shahzad Gul Ayoubi	2017-2021	Approved by the National Assembly
Rural Rehabilitation and Development Minister	Mujiburrahman Karimi	2017-2021	Approved by the National Assembly
Minister of Labor, Social Affairs, Martyrs and Disabled	Faizullah Zaki	2017-2021	Approved by the National Assembly
Frontiers, Nations, and Tribal Affairs Minister	Gul Agha Sherzai	2017-2021	Approved by the National Assembly
Urban Development and Housing Minister	Sayed Sadat Mansur Naderi	2015-2018	Approved by the National Assembly
Counter Narcotics Minister	Salamat Azimi	2015-2021	Approved by the National Assembly
Refugees and Repatriation Minister	Sayed Hussain Alemi Balkhi	2015-2021	Approved by the National Assembly
Attorney General	Mohammad Farid Hamidi	2016-2021	
Director of the National Directorate of Security	Mohammed Masoom Stanekzai	2016-2021	Approved by the National Assembly
State Minister for Martyred and Disabled Affairs	Laluddin Aryubi	2018-2021	Appointed by Ashraf Ghani
National Security Advisor	Mohammad Hanif Atmar	2015-2021	Appointed by Ashraf Ghani
State Ministry for Peace (SMP)	Sayed Sadat Mansoor Naderi	2020-2021	Approved by the National Assembly

Preceded by Second Karzai cabinet	Ghani cabinet 2014–2021	Succeeded by Caretaker Cabinet of the Islamic Emirate
