= Enayatullah Nazari =

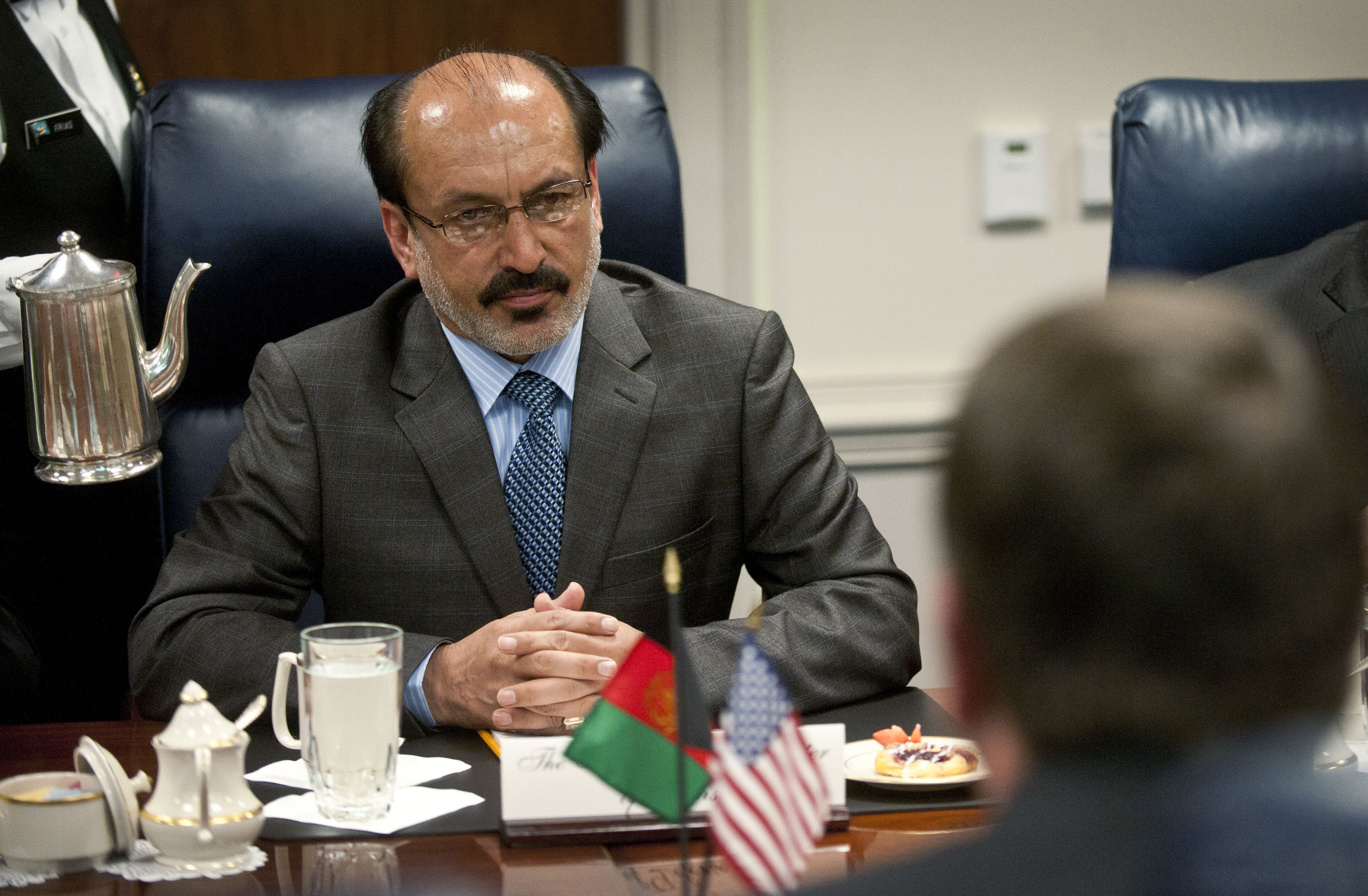

Minister of Defense (Acting)
- In office 08 August 2012 – 15 September 2012
- President: Hamid Karzai
- Preceded by: Abdul Rahim Wardak
- Succeeded by: Bismillah Khan Mohammadi

Minister of Refugees and Returnees
- In office 2002–2004

Personal details
- Born: 1954 (age 71–72) Parwan Province, Kingdom of Afghanistan

Enayatullah Nazari was the acting minister of defense of Afghanistan from 8 August 2012 to 15 September 2012 serving for a transitional period. He took over from Abdul Rahim Wardak who resigned after a no-confidence vote by the Afghan parliament. Nazari previously served as Wardak's deputy defense minister. On September 15, 2012, Bismillah Khan Mohammadi took over as the new Defense Minister.

Born in Parwan Province into a Tajik family in 1954, Nazari went on to study Political Science and Law in the capital city Kabul. Nazari worked for the Afghan Attorney General's Office and the Ministry of Justice during the communist and later the post-communist Islamic State period. When the Taliban rose to power, he kept working with the anti-Taliban Islamic State administration of Burhanuddin Rabbani. After the fall of the Taliban regime, Nazari served as the Minister of Refugees. He was appointed to the position of Deputy Minister of Defense in 2010, a post he filled until becoming the acting defense minister. Nazari is said to be loyal to Afghan Vice President Mohammad Fahim.
