= Sayed Hamid Noori =

Afghan journalist (born 1965)

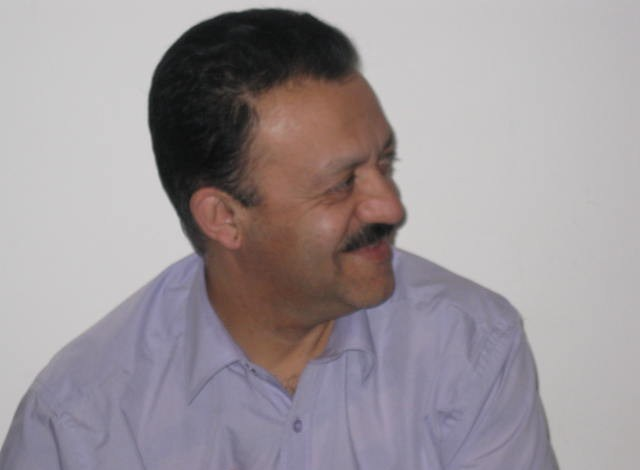
- Born: 1965; Kabul
- Died: 5 September 2010; Kabul
- Occupation: Journalist

Sayed Hamid Noori (1965-2010) was one of the leading journalists in Afghanistan.

== Life ==
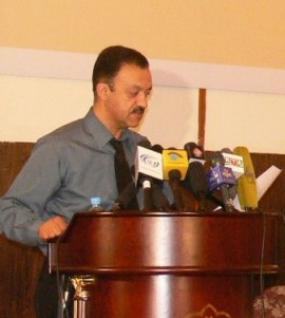

Sayed Hamid Noori was born and raised in Kabul. He attended the University of Kabul and graduated with a degree in journalism. According to his family he always enjoyed literature and the Afghan languages Dari and Pashto. He was a poet and had some of his work published. He had the opportunity to leave Afghanistan in 2009 when "reporters without borders" offered him the opportunity to work in Europe, but he didn't want to leave Afghanistan.

His vision was a democratic Afghanistan with the freedom of speech and expression.

== Work ==
He was anchor for Afghan state television, vice-president of Afghanistan's Independent Journalists Association (AIJA), newspaper editor and teacher of young journalists.

Sayed Hamid Noori was known as the most recognized journalist of Afghanistan. He never minced his words and didn't fear warlords or powerful people. Before his death he had been working on a documentary film about Afghanistan.

== Death ==
On Sunday,5 September 2010, Sayed Hamid Noori was stabbed to death in front of his house in Kabul. His ten-year-old son witnessed his father death, according to Khalilullah Dastyar, deputy Kabul police chief. On the night of his murder Noori had received a series of phone calls that prompted him to leave his apartment.

Sayed Hamid Noori was famous in Afghanistan for his critical reporting about warlords and potentates, but as well about the afghan government. For that reason he had a lot of powerful enemies in Afghanistan.

The Afghan President Hamid Karzai has told the interior minister Bismillah Khan Mohammadi to investigate. Foreign minister of France Bernard Kouchner expressed his regret over the death of Noori. The people responsible for his death are yet to be caught.
