= Abdul Rahim Sayed Jan =

Afghan politician

Engineer Abdul Rahim Sayed Jan is an Afghan politician who was appointed the Afghan Communications Minister of the Afghan Interim Administration—the first post-Taliban government in 2002. Abdul Rahim is a close confident of former president Burhanuddin Rabbani.

He was replaced by Masoom Stanakzai when President Hamid Karzai appointed the Cabinet of the Afghan Transitional Administration.

== Early life ==
Eng. Abdul Rahim Sayedjan was born in Darwaz district of northeastern Badakshan Province. He is of Tajik descent, born to a farming family in Badakhshan. He is a relative of high ranking Jamiat-e Islami official Yunus Qanuni. His early years were spent in Kabul where he was sent to finish his schooling and pursue higher education. He was among the first members of his village to attain university education.

He completed his education at a local technical institute and received his bachelor's degree in civil engineering from the Polytechnic University in Kabul. Soon after, he worked as an engineer at the Ministry of Water and Energy.

Rahim is married, and has three sons and two daughters. His eldest son, Shoaib Rahim, has served as the acting Mayor of Kabul. His nephew Jarullah Mansouri, a close affiliate of former Vice President and leading Jamiat-e Islami official Mohammad Qasim Fahim, was the Minister of Rural Rehabilitaion and Development from 2010 to 2012.

== Political career ==
Rahim served as a representative of Jamiat-i-Islami in Pakistan, primarily involved in efforts to provide humanitarian, educational, and political relief for Afghan refugees as a result of the Soviet Invasion of Afghanistan. He extensively participated in delegations across Europe to garner international support for the Afghan resistance to the Soviet Invasion. From 1993 to 1995, he was the Chargé d'Affaires of Afghanistan in Washington and New York, coordinating American assistance to Afghanistan. Upon the completion of this service, Rahim was assigned as Chargé d'Affaires of Afghanistan in Islamabad, Pakistan until 1996.

During the Taliban rule of Kabul, Rahim was appointed as the Chargé d'Affaires in Beijing, China for over a year and then moved to become Chargé d'Affaires in Dushanbe, Tajikistan to be closer to the affairs of Afghanistan until 1997. Due to strong involvement with and assistance of over a million refugees in Iran, Rahim was appointed as Afghanistan's Consul General in Mashhad, Iran from 1997 until 2001. During his mission the prime focus was towards assisting the immigrant with basic necessity and secondary educational opportunity of the refuges.

== Modern Afghanistan ==
=== Transitional government ===
Under the Afghan Interim Administration, the first post-Taliban government in 2016, Rahim was part of the three-member Jamiat-i-Islami's delegation to the Second Bonn Meeting and appointed as the Afghanistan Minister of Communication and Post. During his leadership in the Ministry, Rahim focused on uniform phone charges, and ensuring compliance to regulation by private telephone companies.

Most notably, he led the ministry to support the launch of Afghan Wireless Communications, a joint venture between the government and Afghan-American businessman Ehsan Bayat. This was lauded as a critical step in redevelopment of Afghanistan's infrastructure, connecting Afghanistan to the world as well as providing jobs within the country.

=== Interim Minister of Refugees and Repatriation ===
Rahim was nominated for the post of Minister of Refugees and Repatriations by President Hamid Karzai after the 2015 elections. However, he did not receive enough votes in the parliamentary approval proceedings to secure the position. He worked as the acting minister, bringing attention to the plight of both internally displaced persons and treatment of Afghan refugees in neighboring countries and the west.

=== Diplomatic missions ===
After the dissolution of the interim government, Rahim served as the Ambassador of Afghanistan to Indonesia from 2018 to 2019.

He served as Ambassador and Representative of Afghanistan to the Organisation of Islamic Cooperation (OIC) in Jeddah, Saudi Arabia from 2017 to 2018.
