= Najibullah Awzhang =

Former Afghan Minister of Public Works

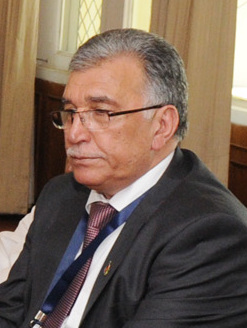
Najibullah Awzhang (2013)

Engineer Najibullah Awzhang is a former Minister of Public Works in the Afghan government.

Awzhang was born in Kabul in 1947 and received a bachelor's degree from the Civil and Industrial Constructions Department at Kabul Poly-Technique Institute in 1974. After his studies he worked as a design engineer for the Afghan Ministry of Construction Affairs. In 1986 he received a master's degree in construction engineering from Kabul Poly-Technique Institute and between 1987 and 1990 he was General Director of PAMA, the Central Institute of Building Projects.

During the civil war of the 1990s, Awzhang left Afghanistan and worked as a design engineer in the Netherlands. After the fall of the Taliban, Awzhang returned to Afghanistan and served as chief of the technical board of the Ministry of Rural Rehabilitation and Development before he became Design Director for an Afghan construction company.

In 2012 he was named Minister of Public Works in the second Karzai government.
