= Abdullah Habibi =

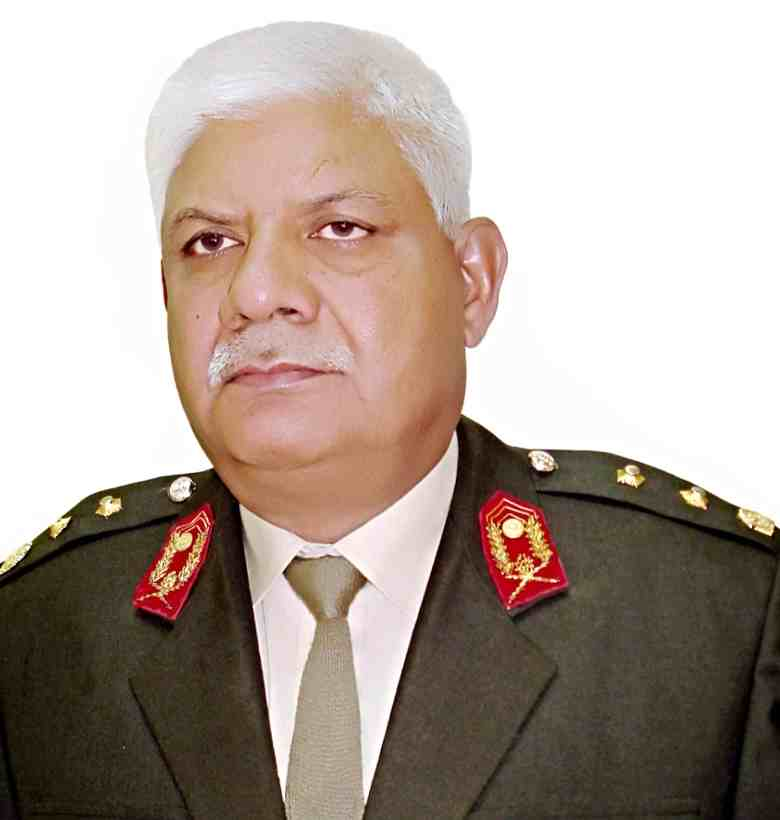

Minister of Defense
- In office 2016–2017
- President: Ashraf Ghani
- Preceded by: Bismillah Khan Mohammadi
- Succeeded by: Tariq Shah Bahrami

Personal details
- Born: 1952 (age 73–74) Chawkay, Kunar Province, Kingdom of Afghanistan

Military service
- Branch/service: Afghan National Army
- Rank: Lieutenant General

Lieutenant General Abdullah Khan Habibi is a four star general of the Afghan National Army. He was the Minister of Defense of Afghanistan from 20 June 2016 to 24 April 2017. He also served as Afghan Ambassador to Jordan from 2017 to 2019.

== Early life and education ==
Abdullah Habibi, a Pashtun and the son of Ghulam Habibullah, was born in Sawki district of Kunar province in 1952. After completion of primary education in 1963, he enrolled in grade 6 of the Military school and graduated in 1969.

In 1969, he was admitted to the Artillery Faculty of Military University and received a bachelor's degree and second lieutenant commission in 1972.

In 1976, Habibi lived abroad for four years to pursue higher education. He returned to Afghanistan after successfully completing and receiving a master's degree in military sciences.

== Military career ==
In a 1990 presidential decree, Habibi was promoted to the rank of major general, and in a 2015 presidential decree he was promoted to lieutenant general. Subsequently, he was promoted to four-star general. In 2003, as per evaluation of concerned commission, he achieved academic rank (professor).

- 1972: Air force 88 artillery
- 1974: Instructor - Military university
- 1981: Lived outside Afghanistan to get higher education
- 1982: 17th Division
- 1984: Operation Director- Border Forces
- 1986: Deputy Intelligence Head - Border Forces (Major General)
- 1987: General Commander of Border forces (Lt. General)
- 1995: First Deputy of Minister of Defense, Education
- 2003: after the transitional government of Afghanistan and recreating Afghan National Army (ANA), worked as Director of Audit and General Staff.
- 2005: Director of Personnel- General Staff (Major General)
- 2008: Military Assistant to the Defense Minister (Major general)
- 2010: Corps Commander, 201st Selab Military Corps
- 2012: Director of Personnel, General Staff (Major General)
- 2015: Chief of Staff, (Lt. General)

== Political career ==
Abdullah Habibi was the Minister of Defense of Afghanistan from 20 June 2016 to 24 April 2017. He resigned after the 2017 Camp Shaheen attack.

== Awards ==
Appreciation Letters, Cash Rewards, Two Star Medals of First Level, Red Flag Medal, Baryal Third Grade Medal, High Government Medal of "Ghazi Mohammad Ayoub Khan", the Conqueror of Maiwand, and other rewards.

== Personal life ==
General Habibi is married and has five children.
