= Ghulam Mujtaba Patang =

Afghan police officer and government minister

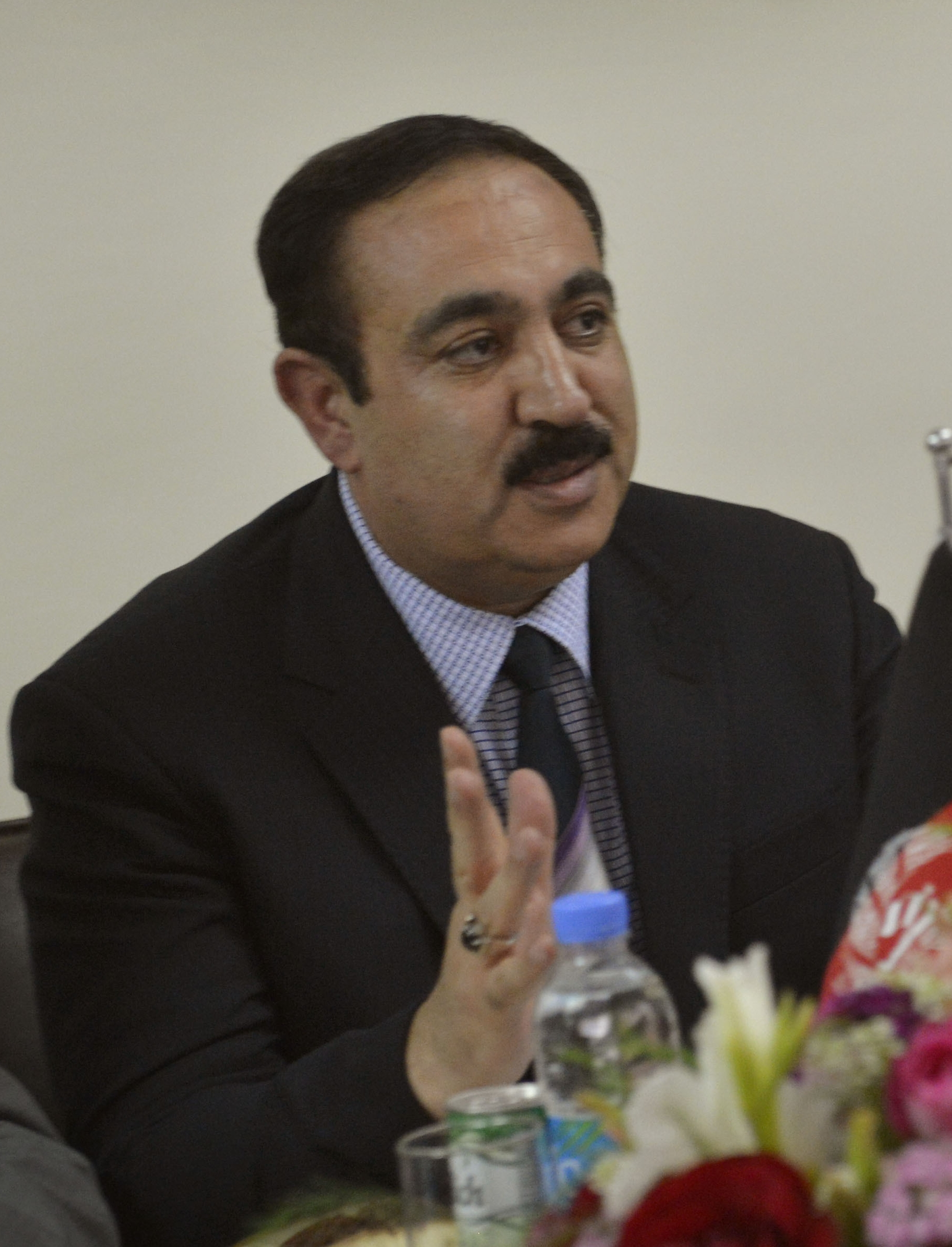
- Patang at the Interior Ministry in Kabul in May 2013.

Interior Minister Islamic Republic Of Afghanistan
- In office 15 September 2012 – 22 July 2013
- President: Hamid Karzai
- Preceded by: Bismillah Khan Mohammadi
- Succeeded by: Mohammad Omar Daudzai

Personal details
- Born: 1963 (age 62–63) Logar Province, Afghanistan
- Other political affiliations: PDPA (until 1992)

Military service
- Allegiance: Afghanistan
- Branch/service: Afghan National Police
- Years of service: 1980–present
- Rank: Major general

Major General Ghulam Mujtaba Patang (born 1963) is an Afghan police officer and the former Minister of Interior of Afghanistan.

== Career ==
Patang entered the service of the Afghan Police in 1980, in the midst of the Soviet–Afghan War. He graduated from the Afghan Police Academy in 1980, and started work as a Second Lieutenant in the Kabul Police HQ. Patang undertook a series of roles under the Democratic Republic of Afghanistan, receiving four promotions and leaving the DRA era as a colonel.

From 1994 to 2002 Patang served as police trainer, operations director, and brigade commander. Patang was appointed as chief of staff of the General Department for Development of Fundamental Regulations in 2002. In 2003 he was appointed general director of PRT Central Office, as police chief of Takhar province in 2006, and later as commander of the Pamir regional command.

In 2010 Patang was appointed commander of the Afghan Interior Ministry's Education and Training General Command, in which role he worked towards improving the quality and quantity of ANP training. During this time the Afghan Police Academy became a member of the world police academies.

On 6 August 2012 Patang became the deputy minister for the Afghan Public Protection Force, and was later appointed Afghan Interior Minister on 15 September 2012. Patang was later sacked from this position by the Afghan parliament on 22 July 2013 due to dissatisfaction with the rising instability in Afghanistan and Patang's perceived failure to curb corruption in the Afghan Interior Ministry.
