= Mohammad Ayub Salangi =

Afghan police officer (born 1965)

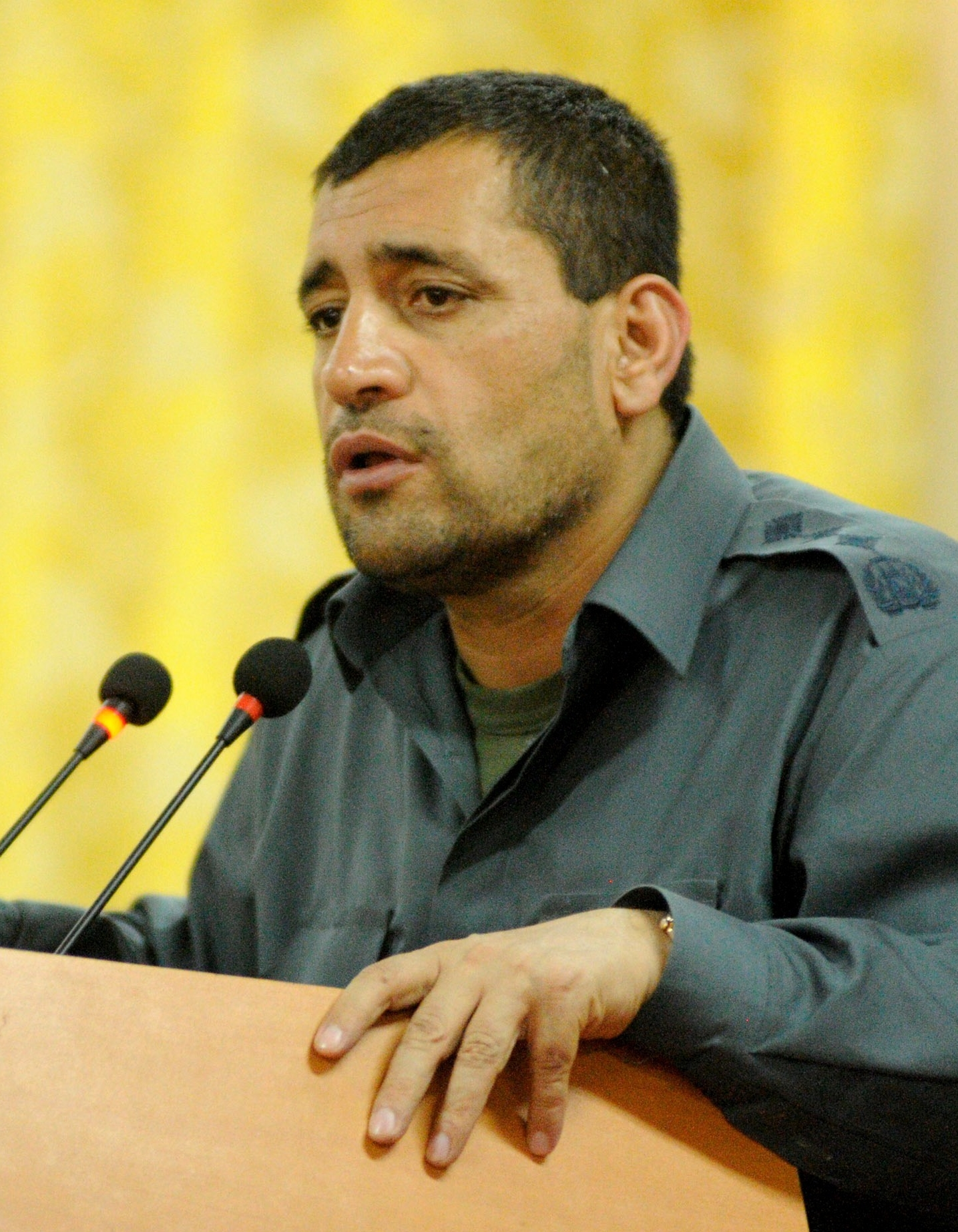
- Lt. Gen. Mohammad Ayub Salangi in 2013.

Interior Minister Afghanistan (acting)
- In office 9 December 2014 – 27 January 2015
- Preceded by: Mohammad Omar Daudzai
- Succeeded by: Nur ul-Haq Ulumi

Personal details
- Born: 1965 (age 60–61) Salang District, Parwan Province, Afghanistan

Military service
- Allegiance: Afghanistan
- Branch/service: Afghan National Police

General Mohammad Ayub Salangi born in Parwan, Afghanistan, is the former Police Chief of Kabul and the Deputy Minister for Security in the Ministry of Interior of Afghanistan.

== Career ==
He has held a number of different security positions throughout Afghanistan. In late 2003 he was described as a "high-ranking Kabul garrison officer" and the "Kabul military commander". At a meeting of security chiefs in January 2004, he was labeled the Commander of Kabul Garrison. In 2005, sometime between March 17 and March 27, he was named the Provincial Police Chief of Kandahar Province replacing Gen. Khan Mohammad Khan. He was later moved to western Afghanistan, where he became the Provincial Police Chief of Herat Province on July 4, 2005, succeeding Gen. Abdul Wahid Baba Jan. He was officially introduced in a ceremony on July 19. This transfer, so soon after his appointment, was attributed to the growing instability in Kandahar, which also played a role in the transfer of Gen. Khan Mohammad Khan, whom he had replaced.

Around April 2007, reports indicate that he had been named the Police Chief of Kunduz Province. However, the following spring 2008, Kabul Police Chief Muhammad Salim Ehsas was suspended and then dismissed after militants were able to launch an assault against President Hamid Karzai during the Mujahideen's Victory Day parade. Salangi was chosen as his replacement, and was installed on July 6, 2008. He was replaced by Lt. Gen. Abdorrahman Rahman in early February 2009, though at the transition ceremony was awarded a letter of appreciation from the Ministry of the Interior. This was one of a number of personnel changes in the Kabul police ranks, though members of parliament were at odds over whether this shakeup would be beneficial to the security climate. Regardless, Salangi soon appeared as the Former Title::Provincial Police Chief of Nangarhar Province, where he stayed for well over a year. In June 2010, Salangi got involved in a dispute with journalists at a press conference after he allegedly refused to answer their questions and proceeded to speak unprofessionally, including making threats against them.

Salangi was then transferred back to Kabul in late 2010, and was replaced in Nangarhar soon after by Ali Shah Paktiawal. Shortly after coming into office, Salangi stated that the police force still needed 5 to 10 years of further training, and that the number of police in Kabul needed to rise from above 10,000 to between 20,000 and 25,000.
