= Dawood Ali Najafi =

Afghan politician (born 1968)

Daoud Ali Najafi داودعلی نجفی

Minister of Transport and Civil Aviation, Afghanistan
- In office March 5, 2012 – Circa 2021

Minister of Transport and Civil Aviation, Afghanistan (Acting)
- In office June 2010 – March 2012
- Preceded by: Abdul Rahim Horas

Personal details
- Born: Dawood Ali; 17 February 1968 (age 58) Afghanistan
- Education: University of Balochistan; University of Peshawar
- Occupation: Politician
- Profession: Doctor
- Ethnicity: Hazara

Dawood Ali Najafi (Dari: داودعلی نجفی; born February 17, 1968) is a politician in Afghanistan. He served as Minister of Transport and Civil Aviation, a position he held since June 2010. Son of Salman Ali, Najafi lived in Pakistan as an Afghan refugee. He received a MBBS from University of Balochistan and an MA in Islamic Studies from University of Peshawar. He also has some working experience with an agency of the United Nations in Pakistan. Najafi returned to Afghanistan in recent years to work for the government. He is fluent in Dari-Persian, Urdu, Pashto and English. Najafi belongs to the Hazara ethnic group.

== See also ==
- List of Hazara people
- Cabinet of Afghanistan
- Ministry of Transport and Civil Aviation (Afghanistan)

Preceded by Abdul Rahim Horas	Minister of Transport and Civil Aviation, Afghanistan; June 2010–present	Succeeded by Incumbent
