= Wais Barmak =

Afghan politician

Wais Ahmad Barmak

Minister of Interior Affairs
- In office 13 August 2017 – 23 December 2018
- President: Ashraf Ghani
- Preceded by: Taj Mohammad Jahid
- Succeeded by: Amrullah Saleh

Personal details
- Born: 1972 (age 53–54) Panjshir, Afghanistan

Wais Ahmad Barmak (born 1972) is an Afghan politician who served as the Minister of Interior. Prior to that, he served as Minister for Disaster Management and Humanitarian Affairs of Afghanistan and as Minister of Rural Rehabilitation and Development.

== Early years and education ==
Barmak was born in 1972 in Panjshir, Afghanistan. He had graduated from the Department of Architecture at Kabul University. He then went on to receive an MSc degree from the School of Oriental and African Studies (SOAS) at the University of London (2004).

== Career ==
In the 1990s, Barmak started working as a field assistant of the ICRC and as a program officer at the Agency Co-ordinating Body for Afghan Relief, and later as a program officer of the United Nations Assistance Mission in Afghanistan (UNAMA).

Barmak was Senior Advisor to the Department of Disaster Management and Preparedness and became a high-level civil servant in the Afghan Ministry of Rural Rehabilitation and Development (MRRD) in 2004.

He was subsequently Senior Advisor on Capacity Development and Programmes, Senior Advisor/Chief Coordinator of the National Rural Access Programme and Executive Director of the National Solidarity Program. From 2008 onward he was Deputy Minister of Programmes at the MRRD.

Barmak is said to be an ally of former vice-president Mohammad Fahim. He was nominated for the position of Minister of Rural Rehabilitation and Development in January 2010, but his nomination was rejected by the Lower House of Parliament and instead Jarullah Mansouri obtained the position. Two years later, then-President Hamid Karzai nominated Barmak for the same position and this time his nomination was approved.

Under his leadership, the National Solidarity Program of the ministry supported 70,000 rural infrastructure projects, such as roads, bridges, retaining walls, protection walls, irrigation schemes, the schools, clinics.

In 2014, after the Karzai administration was replaced by the Ashraf Ghani administration, Barmak began serving President Ghani's Special Representative on Humanitarian Affairs. He became Ghani's advisor in the Northern Zone, tasked to evaluate performance of officials and government agencies and fight corruption.

In October 2015 Barmak became a minister again, when he was appointed to lead the Afghanistan National Disaster Management Authority, which was being upgraded to ministry.

On 13 August 2017, Barmak was appointed as Afghanistan's Minister of Interior.

Political offices
| Preceded by Taj Mohammad Jahid | Minister of Interior; 2017–2018 | Succeeded by |
| Preceded by | Minister of Disaster Management and Humanitarian Affairs; 2014–2017 | Succeeded by |
| Preceded by Jarullah Mansouri | Minister of Rural Rehabilitation and Development; 2012–2014 | Succeeded by Mohammad Tariq Ismati |
