= Mohammad Omar Daudzai =

Afghan politician and diplomat

Mohammad Umer Daudzai
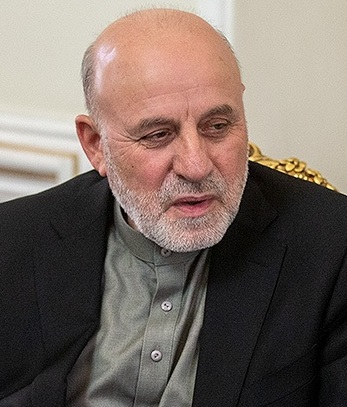
- Daudzai in 2019

Minister of Interior Islamic Republic of Afghanistan
- In office 1 September 2013 – December 2014
- President: Hamid Karzai
- Preceded by: Ghulam Mujtaba Patang
- Succeeded by: Mohammad Ayub Salangi (acting)

Afghan Ambassador to Pakistan
- In office 18 April 2011 – 31 August 2013

Chief of Staff of the President
- In office 2007 – April 2011
- President: Hamid Karzai
- Preceded by: Jawed Ludin

Afghan Ambassador to Iran
- In office 2005–2007
- Preceded by: Mohammad Najibullah
- Succeeded by: Yahya Maroofi

Afghan Chief of Staff
- In office 2003–2005
- Preceded by: Said Tayeb Jawad
- Succeeded by: Jawed Ludin

Personal details
- Born: October 12, 1957 (age 68) Qarabagh District, Kabul
- Party: Independent, Former Hezbi Islami
- Occupation: Politician, Diplomat, Former Aid Worker
- Website: umerdaudzai.com

Mohammad Umer Daudzai (Pashto: محمد عمر داودزی - born October 12, 1957) is a politician in Afghanistan, who most recently served as President Ashraf Ghani's Special Envoy for Regional Consensus Building on Peace and as Head of the High Peace Council (HPC) Secretariat for a few months. He was later appointed President Ghani's Campaign Manager for the 2019 Presidential elections. After a career with international non-governmental organizations including the United Nations Development Program in Geneva, Daudzai started work as two term Chief of Staff of Afghan President Hamid Karzai from 2003 to 2005 and then from 2007 to around 2010. From 2005 until 2007, President Karzai appointed him as Afghan Ambassador in Iran. He then served as the Afghan Ambassador to Pakistan, tasked with advancing efforts to reach a political solution to the war in Afghanistan. In September 2013, Daudzai was asked to serve as Afghan Minister of Interior in Kabul and ensure security for the challenging 2014 presidential elections.

Daudzai also continues to work in Afghanistan's politics through supporting youth groups, and mobilizing politically influential people and organizations in support of strengthening the country's democratic order.

== Early life and education ==
Daudzai was born on 12 October 1957 in the Qarabagh District of the Kabul Province in Afghanistan. He grew up and completed his primary education in his home district of Qarabagh. In order to continue his higher education, Omar moved to the capital city Kabul.

== 80s and 90s: Anti-Soviet Jihad and Association with Hezbi Islami ==
During the 1980s Daudzai became active in the resistance against the Soviet-occupation and joined the Mujahideen group of Gulbuddin Hekmatyar: Hezbi Islami. While still influential with the former cadre of Hebi Islami who are active in Afghanistan's politics, Daudzai has ended his official ties with the party reportedly after the Soviet withdrawal in 1989 and remains politically independent.

== 1996-2003: UN Employee ==
During the Taliban era Daudzai decided to settle in Peshawar, Pakistan, and began working for the organization Save the Children. While working there through a scholarship program, he was able to go to the Victoria University in the United Kingdom for his master's degree in Science. After completing his Masters he came back to work for the Swedish Committee in Jalalabad, Afghanistan. In 1996 he moved to Islamabad, Pakistan, where he started working for the United Nations Development Program (UNDP). In 2001 he moved to Geneva, Switzerland, where he assumed the role of "Area Development Specialist" in UNDP Geneva.

== 2003-2005: Afghan Chief of Staff ==
In November 2003 Daudzai was approached by the Afghan Transitional Administration to assume the office of the Chief of Staff of the President and took the position. At that time, the key challenge was establishing the Afghan state amidst an environment full of traditional power holders and illegal militias. Commenting on how only few militias have disarmed, he said: "Any force not part of the Afghan National Army is a challenge, but this is reality, so we ought to deal with it diplomatically and peacefully. I hope we will succeed."

Daudzai served as Hamid Karzai's Chief of Staff until 2005 when he moved to Tehran as the Afghan Ambassador to Iran.

== 2007-2011: Return as Chief of Staff ==
In 2007, he replaced Jawed Ludin and resumed the position of the Chief of Staff for Afghan President Hamid Karzai.

=== Peace Talks and the Taliban Imposer Episode ===
In the summer of 2010, outside Daudzai's influence, Karzai sat down with a man believed to be former Taliban Cabinet minister Akhtar Muhammad Mansour to discuss peace between the Taliban and the Afghan Government. According to Daudzai, it later turned out the man wasn't Mansour at all, but an imposter who was just a shopkeeper in Quetta. Daudzai blamed the British for this debacle, because he said that they brought the man in front of Karzai. "International partners should not get excited so quickly with those kinds of things," Daudzai said, adding that the incident shows that the Afghan peace talks should be "Afghan-led and fully Afghanized." According to Wikileaks Cables Daudzai also believed that the Norwegians might have been fooled into meeting self-proclaimed members of the Taliban who may in fact not have been Taliban members at all. Daudzai claimed that he had never heard anything about contact between the Taliban and Norwegian authorities.

The Atlantic profiled him as: "A soft-spoken former aid worker, Daudzai served as the president’s liaison to the many warlords and strongmen he had to keep in check—both to ensure stability and to secure his reelection in 2009. While Daudzai was once associated with the conservative Hizb-e-Islami party, the 56-year-old...is more pragmatic in his worldview. When Karzai made an ultimately unsuccessful push for reconciliation with the Taliban in 2011, he dispatched Daudzai as his ambassador to Pakistan. To express his displeasure with the Americans, who tried to oust him during his 2009 reelection campaign, Karzai replaced Daudzai as chief of staff with Abdul Karim Khurram, a conservative former culture minister with an anti-American reputation."

=== Cash Aid from Iran to Hamid Karzai's Office ===
In 2010, there were rumors that then President Hamid Karzai's office was receiving bags filled, with cash from Iranian officials. Karzai acknowledged and accepted the fact that the Government of Iran has been providing millions of dollars directly to his office. Karzai told reporters he had instructed Daudzai to accept the money from Tehran. "It is official and by my order," Karzai said. Iranians also stated that the report was indeed true. Two weeks after the controversy about the Iranian money Daudzai came out to the Afghan Media for an open interview. In the interview Daudzai showed piles of files that proved that every cent of the money coming from Iran were spent on government expenses only and that he had record for all the money that came from Iran. He also claimed that Iranian money had been coming to Afghanistan since 2002 but the issue was brought out only now in order to pressure the Karzai government for political reasons and that since 2002 also the US, the UK and Japan had provided the presidential office with cash assistance. According to Newsweek, nearly every encounter between Afghan and Iranian officials ends up with the Iranians proffering a sack of cash.

According to wikileaks cables Daudzai told deputy US ambassador Francis Ricciardone already in February 2010 that certain Afghan officials were on Tehran's payroll, including some people nominated for cabinet positions. Daudzai claimed that some of these officials had been relieved of their duties because 'you can't be an honest Afghan if you receive a package from Iran.' Daudzai had told Ricciardone, and he said that his government preferred the US' sustained cash support to the 'occasional and unpredictable' payments from Iran.

== 2013-2014: Minister of Interior ==
In 2014, Daudzai served as Minister of Interior during the challenging presidential elections, and he managed to successfully deliver on the difficult task of maintaining security during the elections.

== Dec 2018: Special Envoy for Regional Consensus Building on Peace and Head of HPC ==
In December 2018, Daudzai was appointed as President Ashraf Ghani's Special Envoy for Regional Consensus Building on Peace and as Head of the High Peace Council (HPC) Secretariat for a few months, until he took on the role of President Ghani's Campaign Manager for the 2019 Presidential elections.
