= Tariq Shah Bahramee =

Afghan general

His Excellency Tariq Shah Bahramee طارق شاه بهرامی
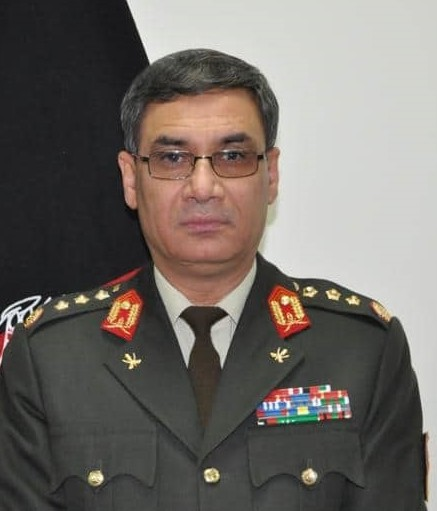

Minister of Defense Islamic Republic of Afghanistan
- In office 24 April 2017 – 23 December 2018
- President: Mohammad Ashraf Ghani
- Preceded by: Abdullah Habibi
- Succeeded by: Asadullah Khalid (acting)

Afghan Ambassador to Jordan
- Incumbent
- Assumed office September 2019

Personal details
- Born: Laghman, Afghanistan
- Website: afghanembassy.com.pl

Military service
- Allegiance: Republic of Afghanistan (1987-1992); Islamic State of Afghanistan (1992-1996); Islamic Republic of Afghanistan (2002-2021)
- Branch/service: Afghan National Army
- Rank: Lieutenant General

Tariq Shah Bahramee (born 1967) is a general in the Afghan National Army and current ambassador of the Islamic Republic of Afghanistan to the Hashemite Kingdom of Jordan.

== Early life and education ==
He was born into a Pashtun family in Qarghayi District of Laghman Province, Afghanistan. He entered and district’s Primary and Secondary schools, then graduated from Sayed Noor Mohmmad Shah High School, in Kabul. Bahramee graduated from Military University in 1987. In 2014, he attended the Defense Academy of Advanced Command Staff College in the United Kingdom.

== Military activities ==
Bahramee started his military service in 1987 and served as deputy to Company Commander, then he served as deputy Battalion Commander in 1988, then Battalion Commander in 1989, and Chief of Documents and Planning Department at the Ministry of National Defense in 1990.

Bahramee re-joined the Afghan Armed Forces in 2002 after the civil war and became the Military Assistant to Central Corps Commander (201 Corps) from 2003-2008. Bahramee also held a series of positions in the Afghan National Army Central Command. In 2009, he took command of 444 Commando Unit (Regiment) during efforts to secure the east part of the country from insurgents, later on, he became Chief of Planning and Operations at the General Directorate of Police Special Unite (GDPSU).

Bahramee oversaw all training and education for the army's infantry, armor, and cavalry force. He commanded soldiers and organizations in wartime including Commander, Combined, and Joint Inter-Agency Task Force in Kabul, Afghanistan. He served as the Director of Office of the Commander–in–Chief and of the National Security Office of Afghanistan until 2017, and then was appointed as Senior Deputy Minister of Interior. Bahramee then succeeded LT. General Abdullah Habibi as the National Defense Minister, position that he would hold until December 2018. He remained on active duty as a lieutenant general while serving as National Defense Minister. In 2018, he was assigned as an Ambassador Plenipotentiary of the Islamic Republic of Afghanistan to the Hashemite Kingdom of Jordan.
