= Mohammad Amin Fatemi =

Afghan politician

Mohammad Amin Fatemi (Pashto: سيد محمد امين فاطمي, born 1952 in Nangarhar Province) is an Afghan physician, politician and former ambassador. He has served as an advisor to the World Health Organization in Geneva, Switzerland for Mediterranean countries. He was the Public Health Minister of Afghanistan, appointed during a cabinet reshuffle in 2004, having previously served in the same role from 1993 to 1995. Suraya Dalil became acting Minister in 2010 and Minister of Public Health (MoPH) in 2012.

Fatemi served as Afghanistan's ambassador to Japan from 2010 to April 20, 2017, when he returned to Afghanistan.
