= Suraya Dalil =

Afghan physician and politician

Suraya Dalil ثریا دلیل
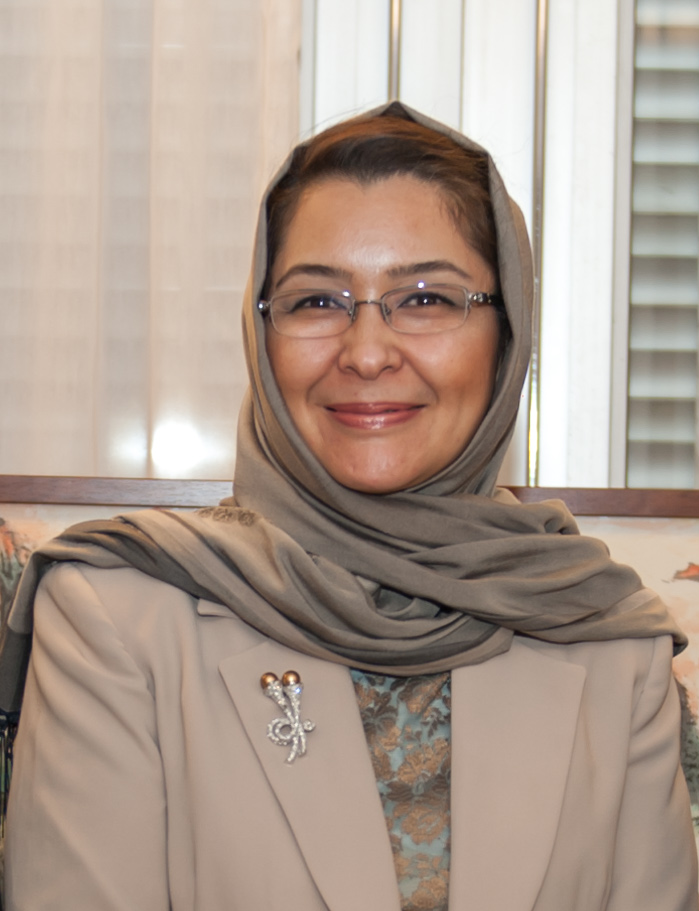
- Suraya Dalil in 2017

Personal details
- Citizenship: Afghanistan
- Occupation: Physician
- Ethnicity: Uzbek

Suraya Dalil (Uzbek/Dari: ثریا دلیل), (born 1970) is an Afghan physician and politician who served as Minister of Public Health from 2010 to 2014 and was the country's Permanent Representative to the United Nations from November 2015 until March 2019.

== Early life and education ==
Dalil was born in Kabul in February 1970. Her father was a teacher and encouraged her education despite it being unusual at the time. She attended the Zarghona High School and graduated from Kabul Medical University in 1991. Her family then moved to Mazar-i-Sharif after her father was injured during the civil war.

In 2004, Dalil was awarded a Presidential Scholarship to attend the Harvard School of Public Health and graduated with a master's degree in public health in 2005.

== Career ==
Dalil worked with Médecins Sans Frontières providing health care to Tajik refugees in northern Afghanistan in 1992 and 1993. She then worked with the International Organization for Migration providing medical assistance to Afghan refugees returning from Pakistan and Iran.

Dalil began working with UNICEF in Afghanistan in 1994, overseeing a large scale measles and polio immunization project. When the Taliban reached Mazar-i-Sharif in 1998, she fled on foot with her family to Pakistan, where she resumed working for the UNICEF Afghanistan office which had been relocated there. After the fall of the Taliban, she returned to Kabul in 2002 with her family. She worked there until 2007, when UNICEF appointed her Chief of Health and Nutrition Program in Somalia, where she worked until December 2009.

In January 2010, Dalil was assigned as Acting Minister of Public Health by President Hamid Karzai, and she was appointed Minister in March 2012. She initiated various strategies to reduce child and maternal mortality rates.

In November 2015, President Ashraf Ghani appointed Dalil as Permanent Representative of the Government of the Islamic Republic of Afghanistan to the United Nations in Geneva, the first woman in the position. She concluded in the role in March 2019.

At the end of 2017, Dalil was named President of the Anti-Personnel Mine Ban Convention (Ottawa Treaty), which bans the use, production, transfer and stockpiling of anti-personnel mines. Afghanistan is one of the countries most affected by these weapons.

Since 2020, Dalil has been Director of the Special Programme on Primary Health Care for the World Health Organization. Since the Taliban's return to power in 2021, she has spoken out about "gender apartheid" and stressed the need for "clear and consistent" engagement with the regime in delivering humanitarian aid and seeking accountability for human rights violations.

== Other activities ==
- International Gender Champions (IGC), Member

== Awards and honours ==
In 2012, Dalil was awarded a prize by the Vaccination World Union for her achievements in implementing country-wide vaccination. In 2014, she accepted a Resolve Award Special Mention from the Global Leaders Council for Reproductive Health recognising Afghanistan's efforts to prioritise reproductive, maternal and child health.

== Selected publications ==
- Dalil, Suraya (2000). "Psychosocial assessment of children exposed to war-related violence in Kabul". Violence and Health: Proceedings of a WHO Global Symposiurn: 174–1.
- Dalil, Suraya; UNICEF (2002). Assessment of services and human resource needs for the development of the safe motherhood initiative in Afghanistan. Afghan Digital Libraries.
- Bartlett, L.; Mawji, S.; Whitehead, S.; Crouse, C.; Dalil, S. (2005). "Where giving birth is a forecast of death: maternal mortality in four districts of Afghanistan, 1999–2002". The Lancet. 365 (9462): 864–870. doi:10.1016/S0140-6736(05)71044-8. PMID 15752530. S2CID 581020.
- Dalil, Suraya; et al. (2014). "Aid effectiveness in rebuilding the Afghan health system: a reflection". Global Public Health. 9.sup1 (Suppl 1): S124–S136. doi:10.1080/17441692.2014.918162. PMC 4136664. PMID 24922192.
- Dalil, Suraya (2015). "Security for Our Shared Home". In Julio Frenk; Steven Hoffman (eds.). To Save Humanity:What Matters Most for a Healthy Future. Oxford University Press. pp. 97–98. ISBN 9780190221553.

== Personal life ==
Dalil's native language is Uzbeki, and she also speaks Dari, Pashto, and English. Her husband is also a medical doctor, and they have three children.
