= Abdul Rahim Wardak =

Afghan politician (born 1945)

Abdul Rahim Wardak عبدالرحیم وردک
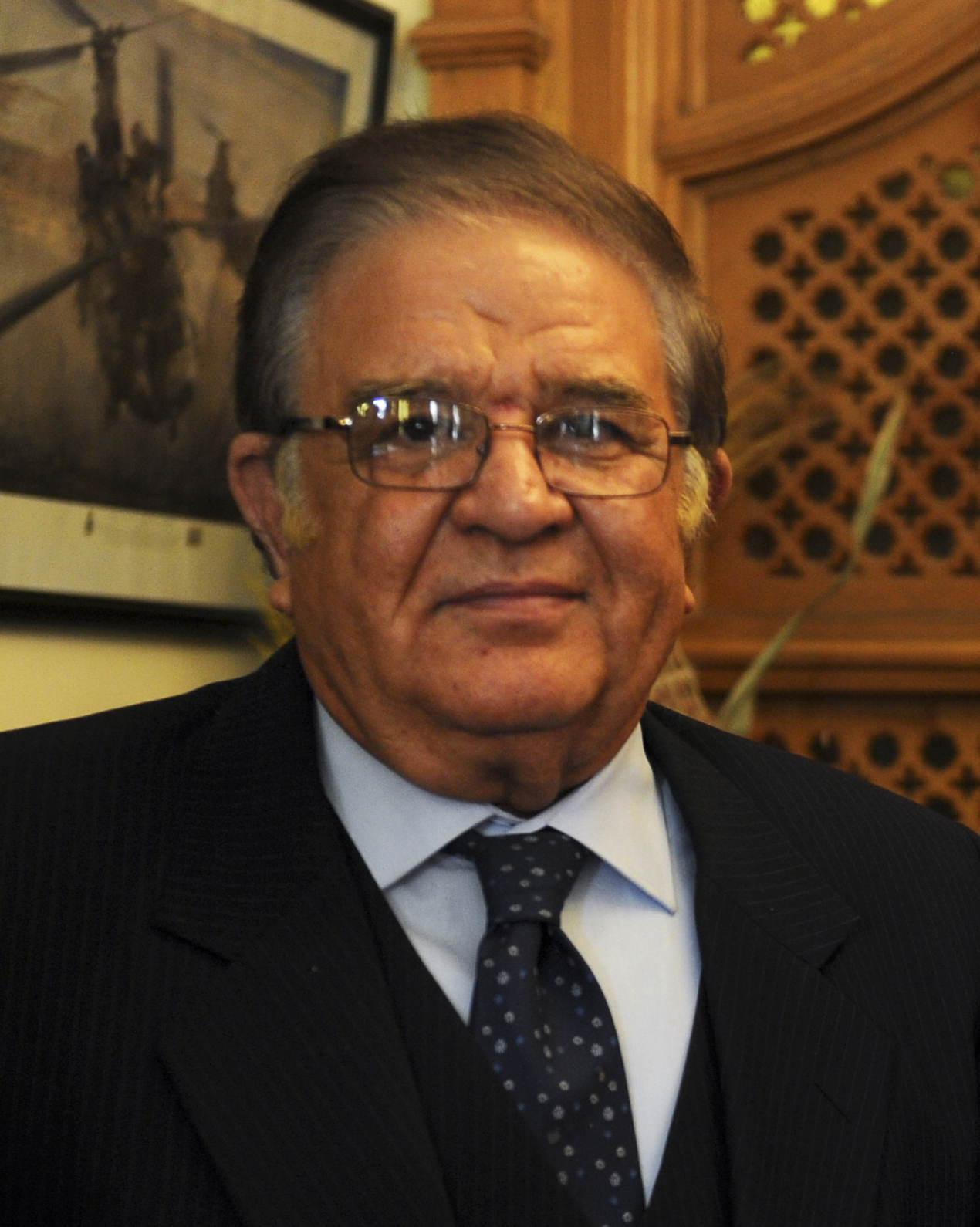

Minister of Defence
- In office 23 December 2004 – 7 August 2012
- President: Hamid Karzai
- Preceded by: Mohammed Fahim
- Succeeded by: Bismillah Khan Mohammadi

Personal details
- Born: 1945 (age 80–81) Maidan Wardak, Kingdom of Afghanistan
- Party: National Islamic Front of Afghanistan (formerly)
- Education: National Military Academy of Afghanistan
- Occupation: Politician, former Mujahideen leader

General Abdul Rahim Wardak (/ˈɑːbˈdɑːl rɔːˈhiːm wɑːˈdɑːk/; Pashto: عبدالرحیم وردک; born 1945) is an Afghan politician and former Defense Minister of Afghanistan. He was appointed on December 23, 2004, by Afghan President Hamid Karzai. Before this appointment, Wardak was the deputy Defense Minister to the former minister, Mohammed Fahim. During the 1980s Soviet–Afghan War, Wardak had been a national Mujahideen resistance leader who fought the Soviet forces. He is an ethnic Pashtun from the Wardak province. Fluent in Pashto, Dari (Persian), and English, his diplomacy has been instrumental in promoting ethnic reconciliation due to his lineage from tribal chieftains with strong Pashtun relationships with all ethnic groups of the country.

General Wardak has testified in front of the U.S. Congress, on how to stabilize the Afghanistan-Pakistan region. He met with Richard Holbrooke in 2009, the U.S. special envoy to Afghanistan and Pakistan, to discuss security with NATO's defense ministers and NATO's supreme allied commander for Europe, U.S. General John Craddock. In 2009, General Wardak spoke at a Washington think tank, Center for a New American Security, where he said "changing course, adopting a new strategy of containment or dropping the idea of a strong central government will be falling into the trap the enemy has laid, helping them to achieve their evil objectives." He signed an accord with NATO commanders for improved cooperation and coordination in counter-terrorism operations. In August 2012, Wardak resigned after receiving a vote of no confidence from the Afghan Parliament. He was also a candidate in the 2014 presidential election.

== Early life and career ==
Wardak, an ethnic Pashtun and son of Abdul Ghani, was born in the Maidan Wardak Province of Afghanistan in 1945. He attended Habibia High School in Kabul, and after graduating there he joined the Cadet University. He completed further studies in the United States and at the Ali Naser Academy in Cairo, Egypt. He has served as a lecturer in the Cadet University and was Assistant of Protocol of the Ministry of Defense. He then served with the Mujahideen, as a military assistant officer in the Mahaz-e-Milli, as military assistant of the Trilateral Unity, and as a member of Itehad-e-Mujahidin and commander of the Jihadi fronts of Mahaz-e-Milli.

He joined one of the seven parties as a member of the military committee composed of "military advisers and senior staff officers from each Party." Pir Sayyed Ahmad Gailani led the National Islamic Front of Afghanistan party of which then Colonel Wardak was a member. Gailani and Mujaddadi were the two moderate leaders of the group of seven. Wardak, as a notable Mujahideen commander, witnessed the "occupation and destruction of the key Resistance complexes at Zhawar in Paktia Province in Eastern Afghanistan by Soviet and DRA forces in the spring of 1986" and described the attacks as "the heaviest since the invasion." He testified several times before the U.S Congress during the war against the Soviets. In 1989, he was wounded by a Scud missile and received treatment in the United States.

After the fall of the Najibullah regime in 1992, Wardak was a member of the Security Committee of Kabul City, Chief of the Army Staff, Director of the Military Officers' Society, Director of the Education Commission, member of the National Army Commission, Deputy Defence Minister, Director of Disarmament Programme and Director of Reform of the National Army.

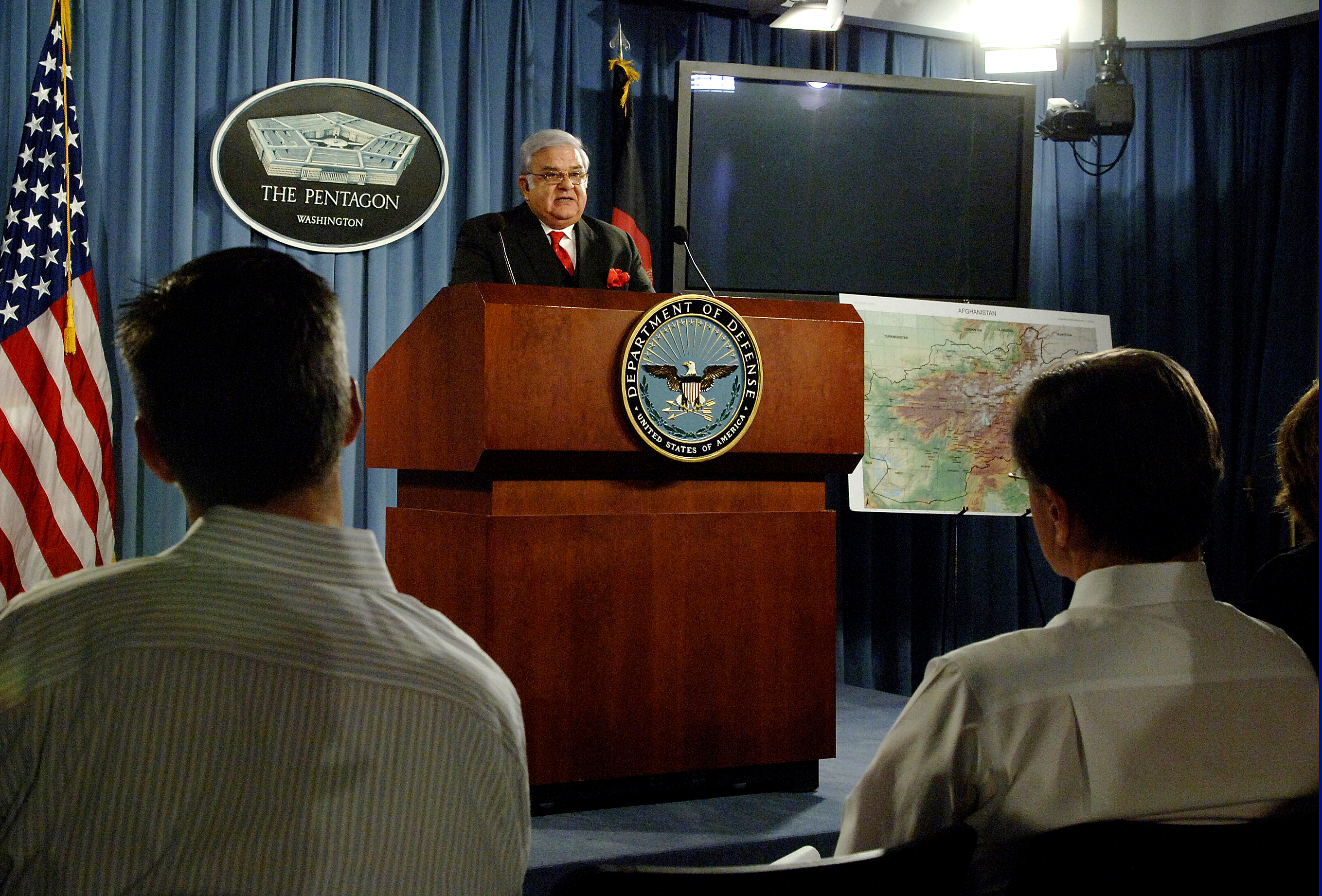
Abdul Rahim Wardak speaking at the Pentagon in 2006.

Wardak's Posts
| Lecturer | Cadet University |
| Assistant of Protocol | Afghan Ministry of Defense |
| Military Assistant | National Islamic Front of Afghanistan |
| Military Assistant | Tri-lateral Unity |
| Commander of the Jihadi Fronts | National Islamic Front of Afghanistan |
| Member | Itehad-e-Mujahiddin |
Member of the Security Committee of Kabul City
Chief of the Army Staff
| Director | Military Officers Society |
| Director | Education Committee |
| Commission Member | National Army Rehabilitation Commission |
| Director | Disarmament Program |
| Director | National Army Reform |
| Deputy Minister of Defense | Afghan Ministry of Defense |
| Minister of Defense | Afghan Ministry of Defense |

== Security sector reform and state building ==
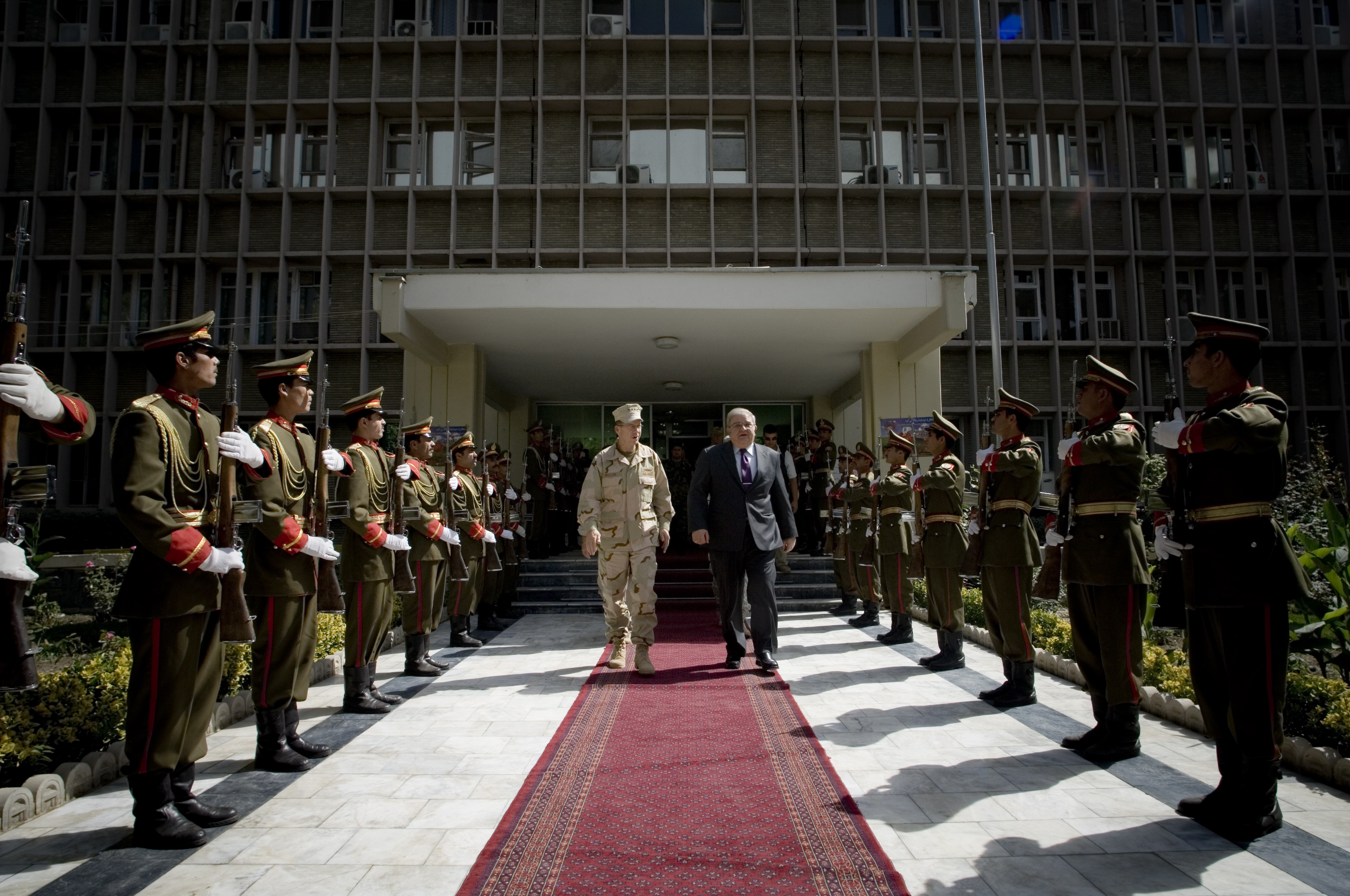
Wardak escorting Mike Mullen, Chairman of the Joint Chiefs of Staff, following their October 2007 meeting in Kabul, Afghanistan.

In April 2005, just 3 years after the fall of the Taliban regime, the Afghan Minister of Defense, General Abdul Rahim Wardak addressed a group of listeners at the International Institute for Strategic Studies in London. In his address the Minister focused on the importance of the Afghan National Army in recreating Afghanistan, some of the requirements for international community engagement, and finally a summary of the current administration's vision to "create a stable, secure and prosperous Afghanistan."

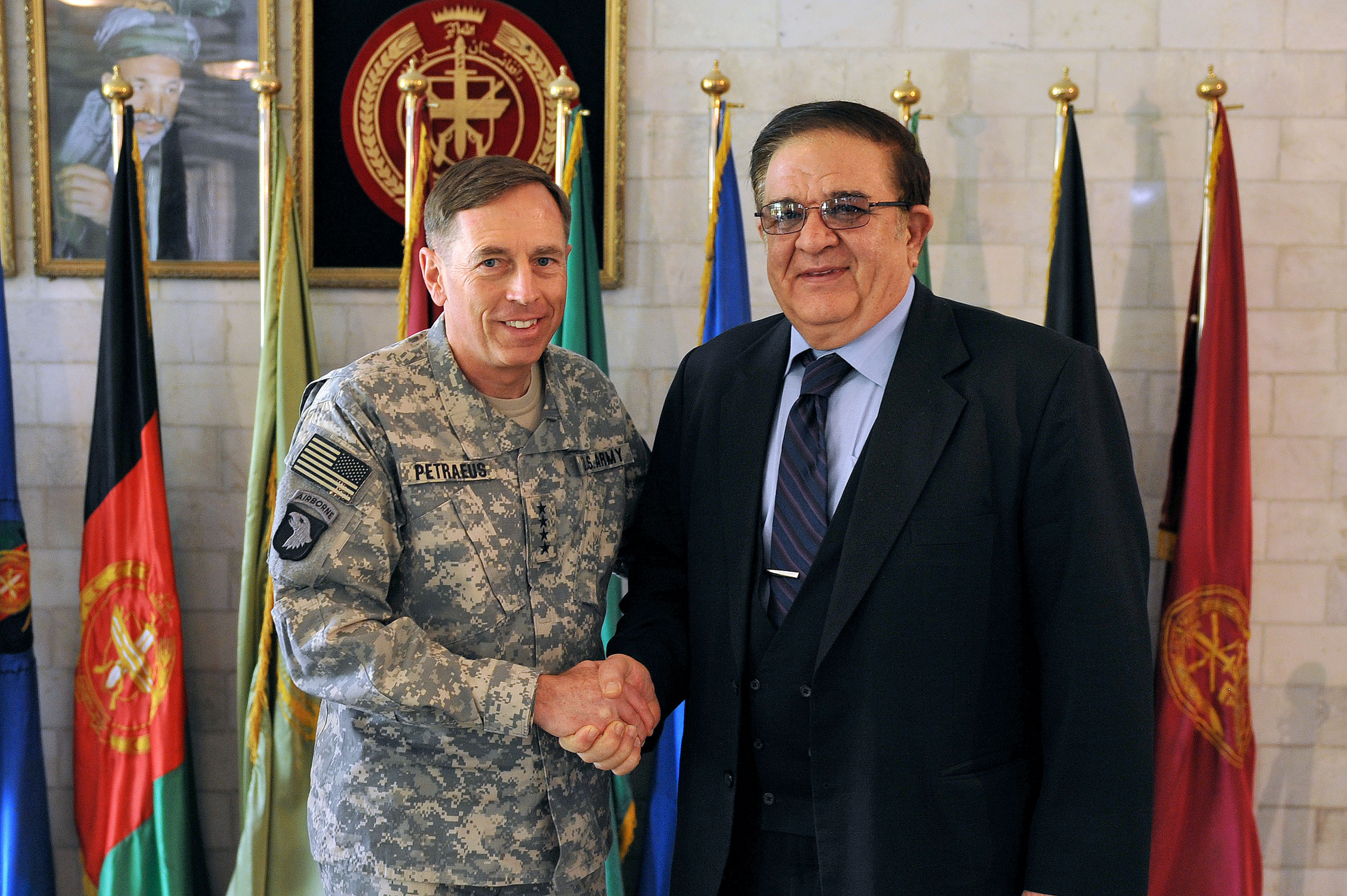
U.S. Army Gen. David H. Petraeus with Wardak in 2010.

On February 28, 2011, General Abdul Rahim Wardak was interviewed by Charlie Rose from 1 to 2 p.m. on a plethora of subjects regarding present and future problems affecting Afghanistan. It was an overview of the progress and future tasks that will have to be accomplished to ensure a stable Afghanistan Central Government, including the reintegration of certain Taliban elements tired of fighting, and reconciliation with Taliban leaders and their integration into the Central government for a unified Afghanistan. It also covered the development of a strong and stable Afghanistan military and police forces. Wardak argued that the future requires the cooperation of Afghanistan's neighbors in denying safe haven to the Taliban, so that they would come to the table and join a peaceful future in Afghanistan.

=== Assassination attempts ===
Wardak survived an assassination attack at the gate of Kabul International Airport in September 2005. It occurred when he had just left his car to enter the airport for a trip to Panjshir Province. "Four gunmen were arrested following the attack on the minister's convoy. It is clear that it was an assassination attempt on the defense minister," an Afghan defense ministry spokesman said.

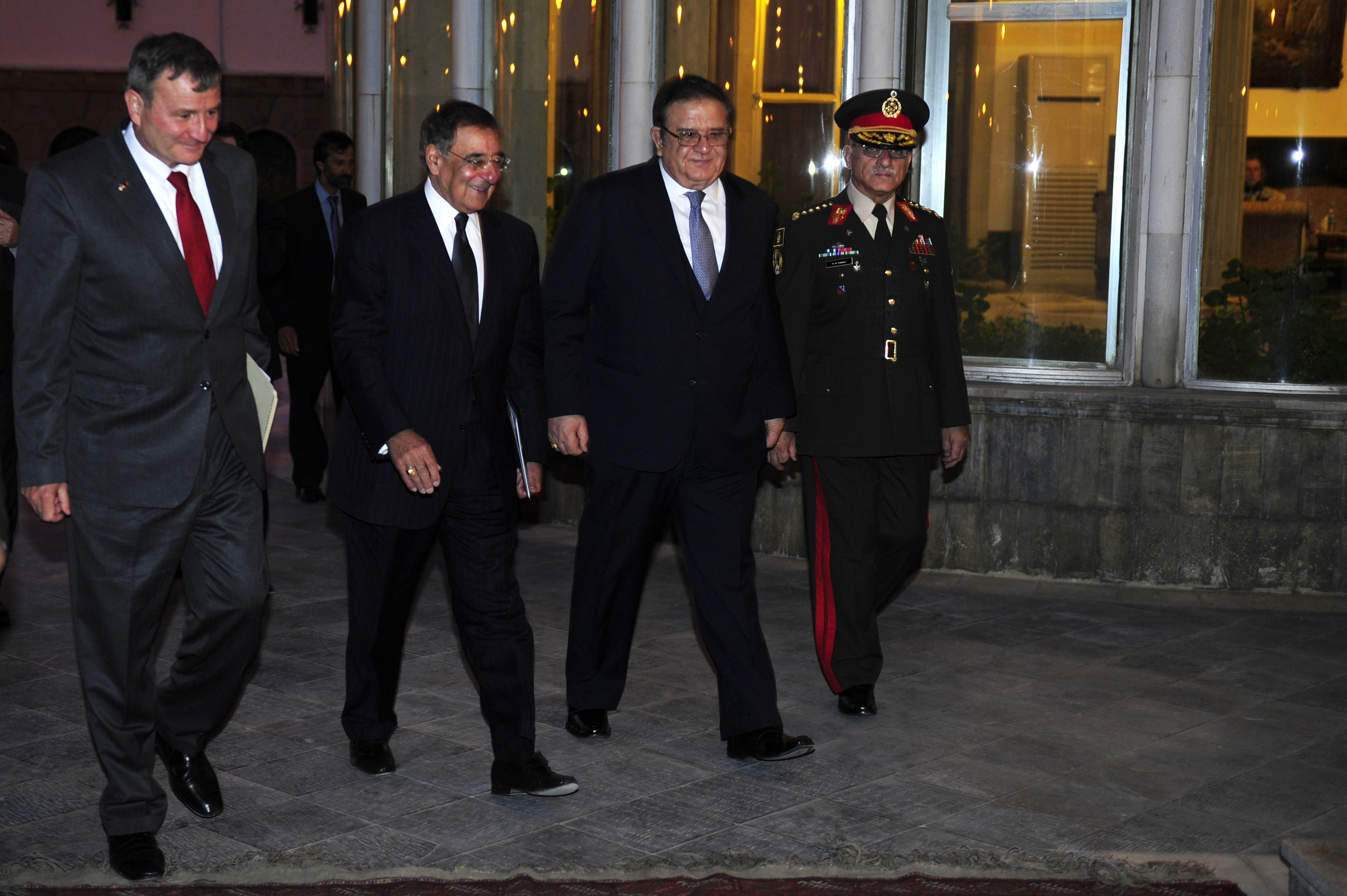
Wardak with U.S. Secretary of Defense Leon Panetta, U.S. Ambassador Karl Eikenberry and Sher Mohammad Karimi, Chief-of-staff of the Afghan National Army.

== Family ==
A son, Hamed Wardak, who was 3 years old when he arrived in the US, headed the firm NCL Holdings. NCL Holdings was investigated in connection with the DoD's investigation into a $2.2 billion Host Nation Trucking contract-scam. NCL Holdings reportedly "brought in more than $360 million in U.S. government contracts for protecting supply lines in Afghanistan." Hamed Wardak also commissioned Patton Boggs LLP "to push for an extended US presence in Afghanistan." In 2019, it was reported that he had been arrested "numerous times", for "his illegal and relentless pursuit" of Sarah Goolden, a New York-based model.

In 2021, a younger son, Daoud Wardak (b. 1977), bought a $20.9 million Beverly Hills mansion. Previously, he owned a $5.2 million condo at The St. Regis Bal Harbour resort in Florida.

Political offices
| Preceded by Mohammed Fahim | Minister of Defence; 2004–2012 | Succeeded by Bismillah Khan Mohammadi |
