= Bismillah Khan Mohammadi =

Afghan politician and general (born 1961)

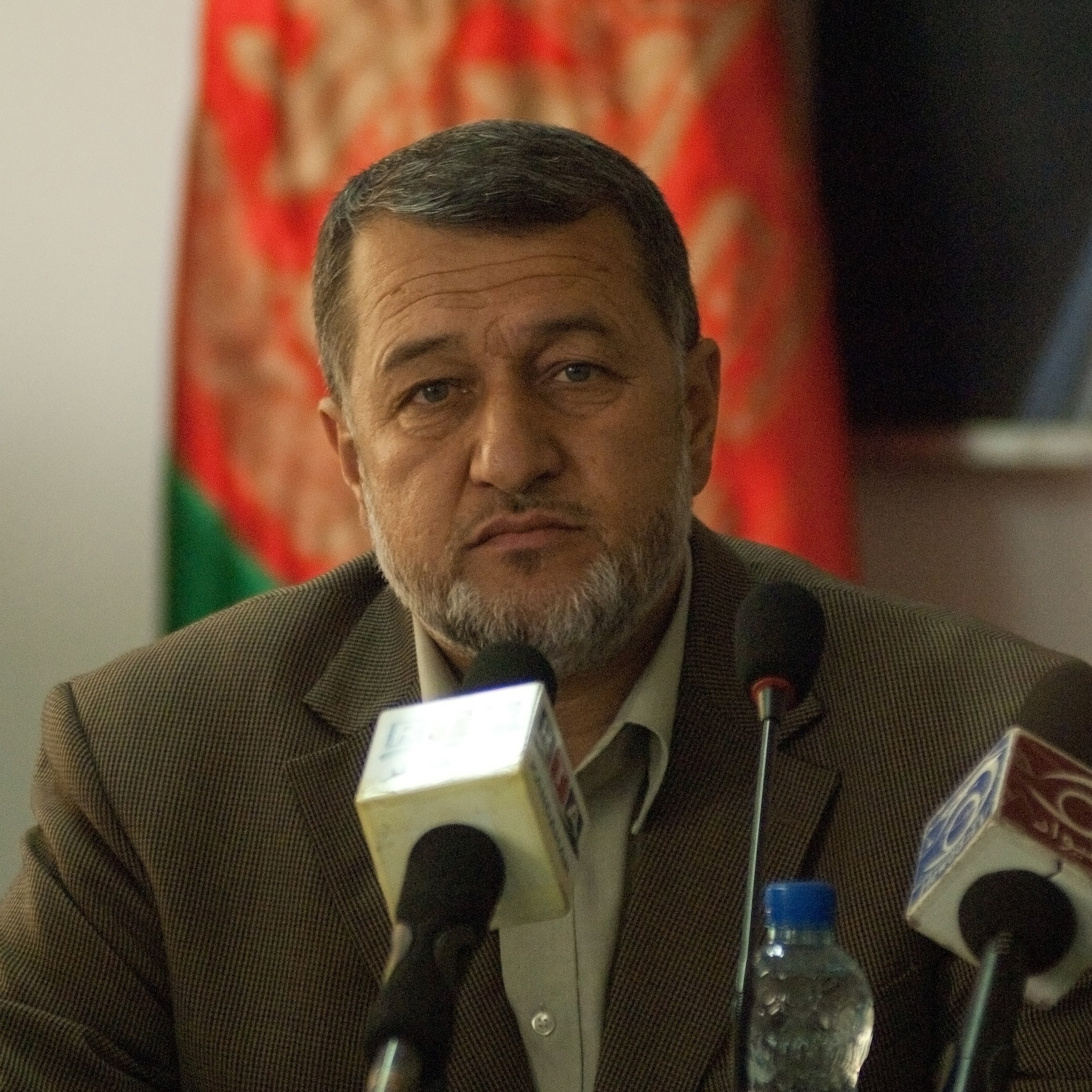
- Bismillah Khan in 2011

Minister of Defense
- In office 19 June 2021 – 15 August 2021
- President: Ashraf Ghani
- Preceded by: Asadullah Khalid
- Succeeded by: Mullah Yaqoob
- In office 15 September 2012 – 24 May 2015
- President: Hamid Karzai; Ashraf Ghani
- Preceded by: Abdul Rahim Wardak
- Succeeded by: Abdullah Habibi

Minister of Interior
- In office 6 January 2010 – 15 September 2012
- President: Hamid Karzai
- Preceded by: Mohammad Hanif Atmar
- Succeeded by: Mujtaba Patang

Personal details
- Born: 1961 (age 64–65) Panjshir, Kingdom of Afghanistan
- Party: Jamiat-e Islami

Military service
- Allegiance: Shura-e Nazar; United Islamic Front; Islamic Republic of Afghanistan
- Branch/service: Afghan mujahideen Afghan National Army
- Years of service: 1979–2010
- Rank: General
- Commands: Chief of the General Staff
- Battles/wars: Soviet–Afghan War; Afghan Civil War; War in Afghanistan; 2001 invasion of Afghanistan; Fall of Kabul (2001); Battle of Tora Bora; Taliban insurgency; Operation Avalanche; 2006 Taliban offensive; 2021 Taliban offensive; Panjshir conflict

Bismillah Khan Mohammadi (Dari: بسم‌الله خان محمدی; born 1961, in Panjshir Province), or Bismillah Khan, is an Afghan politician who served as the defense minister of Afghanistan from 2012 to 2015 and for two months in 2021. From 2002 to 2010, he served as Chief of Staff of the Afghan National Army, and from 2010 to 2012 he held the post of Interior Minister of Afghanistan. He has an anti-Taliban background and once served as a senior commander under Ahmad Shah Massoud. Despite the fall of Kabul to the Taliban in August 2021, Mohammadi claims to remain the minister of defense as part of the government of the National Resistance Front of Afghanistan.

== Early years and career ==
Bismillah Khan Mohammadi was born in 1961 in the Panjshir Province of Afghanistan. An ethnic Tajik, he is the son of Ghausuddin of the Panjshir Valley. After graduating from 14th grade in Abu Hanifa Seminary he enrolled at Kabul Military University.

Bismillah Khan was a former PDPA Parcham member, but after the Soviet invasion of Afghanistan he aligned himself with mujahideen resistance commander Ahmad Shah Massoud, joining his resistance in the Panjshir Valley in 1979.

When the Taliban gained control over large parts of Afghanistan in 1996 establishing their Islamic Emirate of Afghanistan, Bismillah Khan served as Deputy Minister of Defense of the anti-Taliban and still recognized Islamic State of Afghanistan. He was a senior commander in the anti-Taliban resistance, the United Front (Northern Alliance), led by Ahmad Shah Massoud. After the attacks on 11 September 2001, and the subsequent fall of the Taliban regime through United Front ground troops and the U.S. Air Force, Bismillah Khan was appointed commander of Kabul's police force and became a member of the Kabul Security Commission. During that period the security situation in Kabul was better than in other parts of Afghanistan.

== Chief of Staff of the Afghan National Army ==
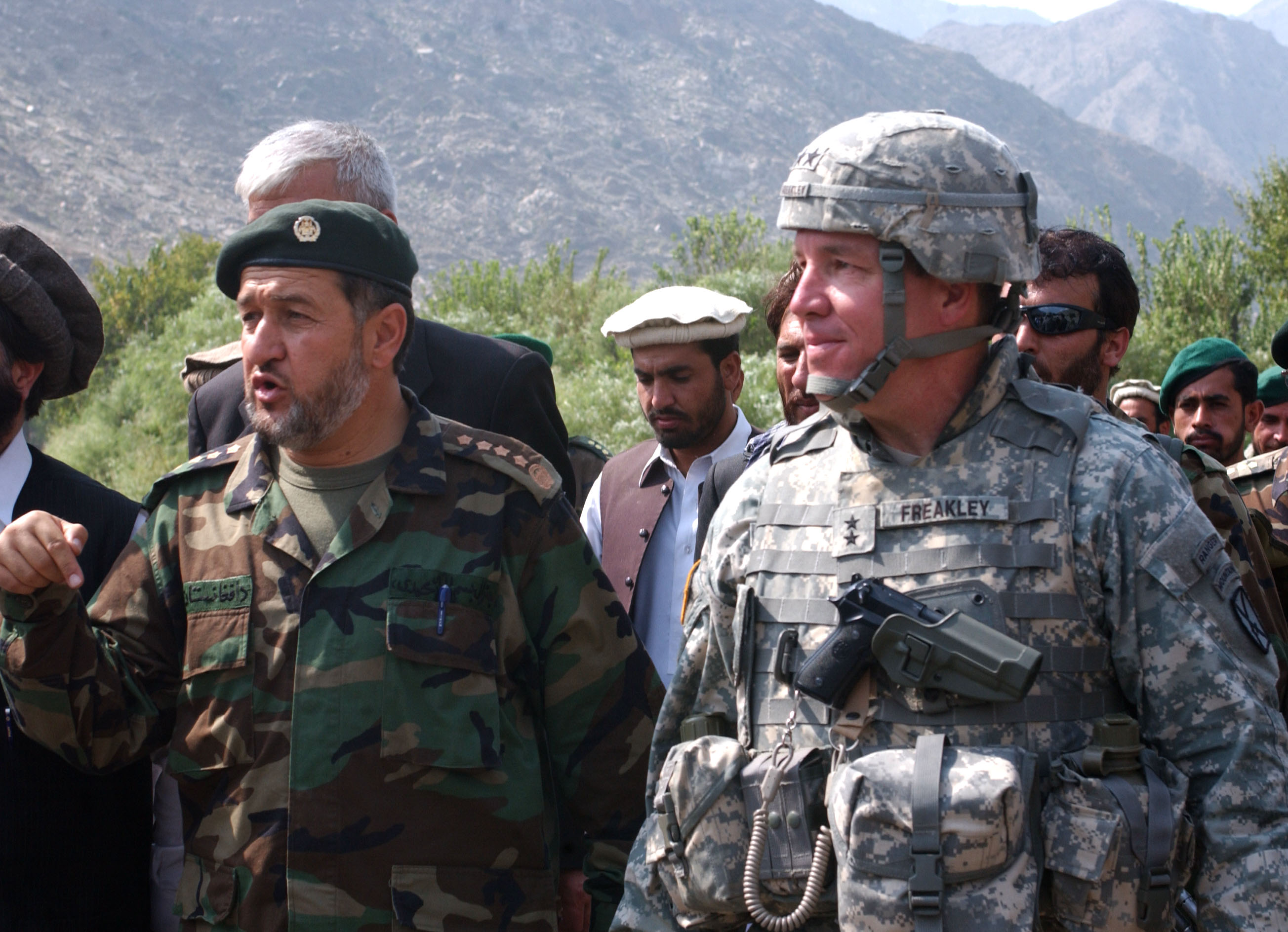
Bismillah Khan as Army Chief of Staff during the inauguration ceremony for a new bridge in Afghanistan's Kunar province

Bismillah Khan was appointed Chief of the General Staff of the Afghan National Army in November 2002 by defense minister Mohammed Fahim. He led a network of Tajik officers associated with Shura-e Nazar, the Northern Alliance political cell, who represented the largest faction within the ANA.

== Interior Minister ==
In June 2010, Bismillah Khan was transferred from his position as Army Chief of Staff to the post of Interior Minister by President Hamid Karzai. As Interior Minister, Mohammadi loudly deplored ethnic fractiousness within the Afghan security forces, stressing national unity and Islamic ethics in the Afghan National Police.

== Minister of Defense ==
Despite the fall of Kabul to the Taliban in August 2021, Mohammadi continued to claim the title of Minister of Defense.

== Awards ==
Bismillah Khan Mohammadi received the Sayed Jamaluddin Afghani, Ghazi Amanullah Khan and Ahmad Shah Baba awards for his efforts in bolstering the Afghan National Army.

Military offices
Position created	Chief of the General Staff of the Afghan National Army; 2002–2010	Succeeded by Sher Mohammad Karimi
Political offices
Preceded by Mohammad Hanif Atmar	Interior Minister of Afghanistan; 2010–2012	Succeeded by Mujtaba Patang
Preceded by Abdul Rahim Wardak	Defense Minister of Afghanistan; 2012–2015	Succeeded by Abdullah Habibi
Preceded by Asadullah Khalid	Defense Minister of Afghanistan; 2021	Succeeded by Mullah Yaqoob
