= Mohammad Qasim Fahim =

Afghan politician (1957-2014)

- محمد قسیم فهیم
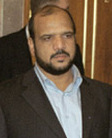
- Fahim in 2001

First Vice President of Afghanistan
- In office 19 November 2009 – 9 March 2014
- President: Hamid Karzai
- Preceded by: Ahmad Zia Massoud
- Succeeded by: Yunus Qanuni

Minister of Defence
- In office 13 November 2001 – 23 December 2004
- President: Burhanuddin Rabbani; Hamid Karzai
- Preceded by: Ahmad Shah Massoud
- Succeeded by: Abdurrahim Wardak

Directors of KHAD
- In office April 1992 – April 1996
- President: Sibghatullah Mojaddedi; Burhanuddin Rabbani
- Preceded by: Osman Sultani
- Succeeded by: Position abolished

Personal details
- Born: 1957 Omarz, Panjshir, Kingdom of Afghanistan
- Died: 9 March 2014 (aged 56 or 57) Kabul, Islamic Republic of Afghanistan
- Citizenship: Afghanistan
- Children: 12

Military service
- Allegiance: Jamiat-e Eslami
- Branch: Afghanistan National Army
- Service years: 1978–2002
- Rank: Marshal
- Commands: Northern Alliance; State Security Agency
- Conflicts: Soviet–Afghan War; Afghan Civil War; War against the Taliban; Fall of Kabul (2001)

Marshal Mohammad Qasim Fahim (Dari: مارشال محمد قسیم فهیم; c. 1957 – 9 March 2014) was an Afghan military commander and politician and the 2nd Marshal of Afghanistan who served as Vice President of Afghanistan from June 2002 until December 2004 and from November 2009 until his death. He was considered a powerful and influential figure during the Karzai Administration.

Affiliated with Ahmad Shah Massoud's Jamiat Islami (Shura-e Nazar) party, Fahim captured the Afghan capital Kabul in the fall of 2001 from the Taliban government as a military commander of the Northern Alliance. Between December 2001 and December 2004, he served as Defense Minister under the Afghan Transitional Administration. In 2004, President Hamid Karzai provided Fahim the honorary title Marshal and a year later, he became member of the House of Elders. He later became a recipient of the Ahmad Shah Baba Medal. Fahim died due to natural causes in 2014; the president declared three days of national mourning in honor of him.

== Early years ==
Fahim was born in Omarz, a small village in the Panjshir Province of Afghanistan and is of Tajik ethnicity. He was the son of Qala Dar from the Panjshir Valley. He is reported to have finished his studies in Islamic Sharia law at an Arabic institute in Kabul in 1977. Most reports show that he had been fighting the Communist rulers since the late 70s. A TOLOnews video chronicling his life reports that Fahim joined the Muslim Youth Movement of Afghanistan while he was still in college. He fled Afghanistan after the Communist coup of 1978, he became a refugee in Peshawar. He returned to Panjshir and began to work under Commander Ahmad Shah Masood.

== Careers ==
When the Soviet-backed Afghan government collapsed in 1992, Fahim became a key member in the new government. He was appointed head of the Afghan intelligence service KHAD, under interim president Sibghatullah Mojaddedi. He continued to serve as the country's head of intelligence under president Burhanuddin Rabbani.

In 1996, Fahim personally offered to evacuate former President Mohammad Najibullah, then in custody in Kabul, from the advancing Taliban forces, but Najibullah refused to be evacuated and was captured and executed by a Taliban mob. Fahim continued to serve as head of the Intelligence and Minister of National Security of the internationally recognised United Islamic Front Government, even when it was ousted and the Taliban took the power over most provinces of Afghanistan in the second half of the 1990s. During this time of Taliban rule in Afghanistan Fahim was active as military commander for the United Islamic Front in the north of Afghanistan, especially in Panjshir and Mazar-i-Sharif.

=== As Defense Minister ===
On 9 September 2001, Ahmad Shah Massoud, Afghanistan's most important resistance leader and Defense Minister of the ousted but international recognized government, was assassinated by al-Qaeda operatives posing as journalists. Two days later, Fahim was confirmed as the new defence minister of the United Islamic Front (Northern Alliance), succeeding Massoud. Fahim was a close ally and protégé of Massoud.

In the wake of building pressure of the US against the Taliban regime after September 11, 2001, as general commander of the mujahideen resistance forces, Fahim became America's main proxy in the fight against the Taliban. He was anxious to start a military offensive and even pledged to launch an attack against the Taliban, without waiting for US military action, saying: "Today we have a chance to defeat the Taliban and the terrorists, and we will use it whatever the cost." On 7 October, the day the US started bombing Taliban targets, he proclaimed an offensive on the northern and western fronts.

On October, 20, a US team of Green Berets landed in Afghanistan and teamed up with Fahim. On 30 October, Fahim met with American General Tommy Franks where they discussed the idea to launch the first major strike of the war against Mazar-e-Sharif, a city that Fahim a month earlier named as the first city that he would conquer.

Mazar-e Sharif was captured by opposition forces on 9 and 10 November and only a few days later, the Taliban evacuated Kabul. US President George W. Bush had requested that opposition forces would not enter the city before a new, broad-based, multi-ethnic government was formed. But Fahim went into the city with a group of specially trained security personnel, although he made sure to leave the main body of his troops outside the city.

At the end of November, forces loyal to Fahim captured the city of Kunduz. That brought Fahim in charge of two of the five biggest cities, since other main cities were captured by militias of Gul Agha Sherzai and Hamid Karzai (Kandahar), Ismail Khan (Herat) and Abdul Rashid Dostum (Mazar-e-Sharif).

In the first days after the fall of Kabul, a supreme military council, headed by Fahim, was set up to administer the captured parts of the country. The military council gave itself a three-month mandate in which they proclaimed not to hand over the power to United Islamic Front president Burhanuddin Rabbani.

=== Formation of an interim government in Bonn ===
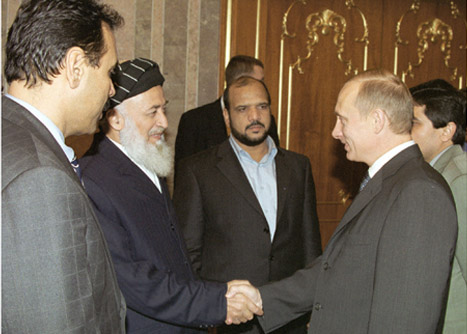
Marshal Fahim (center) standing next to former Afghan President Burhanuddin Rabbani and Russian President Vladimir Putin in October 2001.

During these three months, the international community sponsored a conference on Afghanistan in Bonn to decide about the future leadership of the country. With crucial US military help, the opposition forces had captured virtually all of Afghanistan from the Taliban in the beginning of December 2001, and in Bonn the formation of an interim administration was discussed.

As the US started bombing Afghanistan in the fall of 2001, it became clear that the United Islamic Front of Fahim would play an important role in the transition government that would emerge after the Taliban was ousted. However, since Fahim lacked Massoud's magnetism, his role as opposition leader was generally seen as temporary. When in the first weeks of US bombardments Fahim's forces did not make any large breakthroughs, it was speculated that he was struggling with his role and he appeared wooden and awkward in front of his troops. But although Fahim was described as colorless, it was clear that as the leader of the main military forces that were fighting the Taliban, Fahim had to play a central role in any possible government that would succeed the Taliban.

In the talks in Bonn Fahim took a leading role, together with two other young and moderate Tajik leaders from the United Islamic Front (UIF), Yunus Qanuni and dr. Abdullah. After the death of Massoud, this trio had de facto been leading the United Islamic Front. Fahim was reportedly advocating a broad-based government headed by someone outside the leadership of the United Islamic Front. According to sources Fahim lobbied for Hamid Karzai as the next Afghan president instead for his formal leader Rabbani.

The Bonn conference bypassed President Rabbani and appointed Hamid Karzai as Interim President. Qanuni, Abdullah and Fahim all got crucial posts in the new government. Initially there was some fear that the trivium of former Massoud-aides could overshadow Karzai, but at the same time, they were praised for giving away the chairmanship while they controlled Afghanistan militarily.

As commander of Afghans largest military force, Fahim was appointed Defence minister of Afghanistan. At the same time, he was one of the five vice-chairs of the Interim Administration. Together with Abdullah and Qanuni, one of the most dominant figures in the interim administration.

=== Vice-Chairman of the Interim Administration ===
In the interim administration, Karzai much needed the support of Fahim. Karzai was the official chairman of the executive committee of the government, but as commander of the most effective military force commanding the capital, Fahim had the real power.

Since Fahim was afraid a large international peace keeping force would take away his power base, he argued for a limited number of foreign troops in Afghanistan. Karzai, however, was less afraid of international involvement, and might even fear a Tajik hegemony of Afghanistan without them.

After the inauguration ceremony on 22 December 2001, where Fahim was installed as minister of Defence and vice-chair of the interim government, he requested that international forces leave the capital. He "would no longer accept foreign troops in Afghanistan operating without a UN mandate," Fahim said. Later he demanded that 100 British servicemen who just had entered the country leave Bagram Air Base. "The British forces perhaps have an agreement with the UN but not with us," said Fahim. He also stated that a UN force should not exceed 1,000 men and should play a very limited role in Afghan politics and that his own forces could eradicate sources of instability. His own Northern Alliance forces should police Kabul, said Fahim, because he said that his troops in Kabul were security troops, not military.

Fahim discussed the deployment of foreign troops with US Generals and Defense Secretary Donald Rumsfeld who demanded the presence of a large international force. Fahim was in charge of the meetings with the British General John McColl to establish the exact task, length of stay and size of international forces. Reportedly, Fahim refused to meet McColl until Rumsfeld pressured him and told him to meet the British general.

In the end, it was decided that an international security force of a few thousand troops would be deployed, but that they would agree to Fahim's demands to not take control of Kabul and not start immediately disarming Afghan militias. Of the approximately 3,000 men that would be deployed, 2,000–3,000 men would be deployed in a garrison in the center of Kabul. Of the 30,000 men, only a third would be deployed for security reasons, the others would receive logistical and humanitarian tasks. Another important task for the British and Americans would be the training of the Afghan troops. Fahim expressed the wish to build an Afghan army of around 250,000 men. After the negotiations, The Telegraph described Fahim as someone who is popularly known as "the village and Pansher valley idiot," but who actually very shrewd.

When the first foreign troops of the peacekeeping mission arrived on 20 December 2001, Fahim said "They won't be needed for security." "They are here because they want to be," and because the United Nations Security Council sent them to Afghanistan to prevent another civil war, Fahim said, but insisted that their presence was merely symbolic and that the foreign troops were not supposed to use force. "Some ministers in the new government who have always lived outside the country are worried about security and they feel they need the peacekeepers for protection, but when they arrive here they will see that the situation is OK and that it is not necessary" Fahim added, possibly hinting at Chairman Karzai who lived for years in Pakistan. The heavily armed units of northern alliance soldiers who swept into Kabul will be withdrawn from the streets, Fahim added, but they will not leave the capital.

There was not only a disagreement between Fahim and Karzai about the size of the peacekeeping force, but also about the duration they were supposed to stay in Afghanistan. Fahim indicated that the international forces should leave after six years, but Karzai said that they would stay "as long as we need them, six years as a minimum".

As Defense Minister, Fahim had the task to unite the country's disparate armed groups. A daunting task, since Fahim's own troops had so far shied away from vast stretches of southern and eastern lawless lands under the sway of armed former Taliban warriors, most of them members of the dominant Pashtun ethnic group. Still, although a sometimes bumbling and awkward figure in public, and especially unpopular with the Uzbek minority, Fahim quietly had gained control of the Northern Alliance's fractious military commanders. He continued to hold this control, even when Abdul Rashid Dostum, the most powerful Uzbek warlord who had taken control of the city of Mazar-e-Sharif and who was very critical of the Bonn Agreement, was appointed his deputy. But the cooperation between the two strongmen didn't start easy, already after a month forces of Dostum were clashing with forces of Fahim over control of a district in Kunduz Province. The dispute erupted after his forces tried to disarm soldiers from a rival military unit. When those troops resisted, a firefight broke out, killing three soldiers.

On 29 December, Fahim urged the Americans to stop their bombing campaign on Afghanistan, because bin Laden had probably fled Afghanistan and moved to Peshawar in Pakistan. "Osama is out of our control," Fahim said. A day later, however, foreign minister Abdullah Abdullah stated that they did not know where bin Laden was and that air raids will continue "for as long as it takes to finish off the terrorists."

=== Relations with other states ===
As Minister of Defence in his first months, Fahim traveled extensively to neighbouring countries to build relations between the new government and Afghanistan's most influential neighbours. When US-envoy to Afghanistan Zalmay Khalilzad said in January 2002 that Iran might be backing Afghan fighters in an attempt to unsettle the Karzai-government, Fahim, who visited the Iranian minister of Defense half January, stated that there was no sign of Iran "creating insecurity". At the end of January 2002, Fahim set in on a meeting of Karzai met with United Nations Secretary General Kofi Annan and spoke with the two of them about security issues.

=== First term as Vice President ===
During the 2002 loya jirga, where a new transitional government was formed, Fahim supported the candidacy for president of Karzai. In turn he retained as vice-president and defense minister.

In the summer of 2002, American officials are said to have picked up intelligence that Fahim was considering an attempt to assassinate Karzai, as a result of which, in July 2002, US Special Forces wrested presidential bodyguard duties away from soldiers loyal to Fahim. The move followed the assassination earlier in the month of one of Karzai's vice presidents, Abdul Qadir, a powerful Pashtun warlord and Karzai ally.

As Defense Minister, he toured army bases in the United Kingdom, negotiated security issues with US General Tommy Franks and Canadian Defense Minister John McCallum, NATO Secretary General George Robertson, visited Moscow and Washington, DC. He also replaced 15 ethnic Tajik generals with officers from the Pashtun, Uzbek and Hazara ethnic groups, although he was accused of delaying reforms that would have required him to replace his Tajik generals with a more ethnically balanced officer corps. The reform was a precondition for carrying out a $200 million UN-sponsored plan to pay off and disarm 100,000 militiamen loyal to the warlords.

While holding the position, he continued to command his own militia which he inherited from the United Front or more commonly known as the Northern Alliance. However, on 10 December 2003, he ordered part of his militia to transport their weapons to an Afghan National Army installation near Kabul.

On 12 September 2003, Miloon Kothari, appointed by the United Nations Commission on Human Rights to investigate housing rights in Afghanistan, announced that many of the government ministers including Fahim and Education Minister Yunus Qanuni were illegally occupying land and should be removed from their posts. However, three days later, Kothari sent a letter to Lakhdar Brahimi, the head of the UN in Afghanistan, saying he had gone too far in naming the ministers.

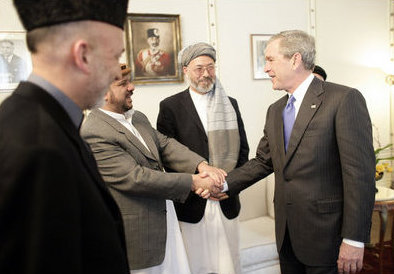
Marshal Fahim greeting former U.S. President George W. Bush in 2006. Others to the side are Afghan President Hamid Karzai and 2nd Vice Afghan President Karim Khalili with the turban.

In 2004, many expected Karzai to name Fahim or Qanuni as candidate for vice-president in the upcoming presidential election, but he named Ahmad Zia Massoud instead. Subsequently, Fahim backed the candidacy of his fellow Tajik, Yunus Qanuni for president.

After Karzai's victory, Fahim was not reappointed Defense Minister and was succeeded by his deputy Abdul Rahim Wardak. Karzai dropped Fahim from his cabinet to rebalance the Ministry of Defence, and as a result of intense pressure from various foreign organizations who viewed Fahim as a major bottleneck in the disarmament process. He was dismissed in August 2004. Fahim also had no higher education, and article 72 of Afghanistan's constitution states that an appointed Minister to the President's cabinet should have a higher education. In a decree made in December 2004, Karzai, who called Fahim his "close friend and confidant" confirmed that Fahim would hold the rank of Marshal, Afghanistan's highest, for life. Years after his death, at a gathering of Fahim's supporters and Afghan politicians, Marking the 5th anniversary of his death, Hazara leader Muhammad Mohaqiq, defending Fahim's military title arguing "When he was given the title of Afghanistan's Marshal by the former president, he deserved it. Because the Mujahideen had won the war against the occupier forces."

Although Fahim lost his formal role in the government, he remained a powerful and influential figure in Afghanistan. In 2006, Karzai, faced with a resurgent Taliban, returned Marshal Fahim to Government as an advisor.

Some Afghan analysts attest that, despite losing his military position, Fahim remained a very powerful figure in the country. "[He] is particularly popular among people in the north, because he had fought Soviet Russia, and later the Taliban and Al-Qaeda. He spent many years fighting aggressors." (Erada, 2005)

Later in the year 2006, Karzai said, "Marshal Fahim is one of the sons of our [mujahedin], a patriot and [a man who loves] his country. I have a great deal of respect for Marshal Fahim. He has been my close friend and confidant. He has his own unique place in Afghanistan. He has been a respectable military man. He is a five-star general. And he is a senator." Regarding his decision in appointing Marshal Fahim as one of his advisors, Karzai added that "I hope that officially as my adviser, he will continue to cooperate with me. He comes to all of the National Security Council meetings. He is my dear brother. No one can ever reduce the respect that Marshal Fahim has earned for himself." (Azadi Radio, 5 April 2006) Throughout his time as a public figure, he has had persistent accusations of corruption and human rights abuses. When he died, the American-led coalition simply expressed condolences to Fahim's family.

Fahim was a member of the (now defunct) political party United National Front, a broad coalition of former and current strongmen, mainly with a basis in the United Islamic Front.

=== Second term as Vice President ===
In 2009, Fahim was chosen by incumbent President Karzai as candidate for first Vice President in the 2009 presidential election. Fahim by then had a reputation as one of Afghanistan's most powerful, brutal and corrupt warlords. Karzai's decision to include him on his ticket therefore dismayed international observers. Many in Kabul alleged Marshal Fahim was at the time involved in criminal activities, including kidnapping for ransom. By choosing Fahim as his vice-president, Karzai was said to have stained his own credibility even further.

But for Karzai such considerations were trumped by Fahim's status as a leading member of Afghanistan's Tajik minority (the second largest ethnic grouping after Karzai's Pashtun community), which helped to split the Tajik vote which might otherwise have gone to Karzai's Tajik rival, Abdullah Abdullah.

The election was won by Karzai and from 19 November on, Fahim again served as vice president.

== Assassination attempts ==
Fahim survived several assassination attempts. His convoy was targeted when a mine exploded underneath the central car in Fahim's convoy. He had been on an official visit to the eastern city of Jalalabad "to discuss a new government campaign to stop farmers growing poppies for the opium trade and other issues with local commanders and tribal leaders." (BBC, 8 April 2002)

Fahim survived another attack later in 2002. This time, the man behind the attack was arrested by the intelligence agency. The alleged person carried with him "22 pounds of explosives in the pockets of his jacket, attached to wires and apparently ready to explode." (The New York Times, 24 November 2002)

In June 2003, a bomb was found in front of his home. Later in the year, the head of his personal security died at the hands of a suicide bomber.

Fahim survived another assassination attempt in the northern Kunduz province. Only 26 July 2009, as the running mate of President Karzai for the 2009 elections, his convoy was attacked in an ambush staged by the Taliban. The Taliban attacked Fahim's convoy using automatic rifles and rocket propelled grenades.

== Peace negotiations of 2010 ==
On the celebrations of Nowruz, New Year's Day, of 1389 (21 March 2010) in Mazar-i-Sharif in Northern Afghanistan, Fahim reached out to militants. He declared that, with their input, a coming national conference would lay the foundations for a peace that would end the Taliban insurgency. He called on resistance forces to participate in a jirga, or assembly, planned for late April or early May. He pledged that the Afghan government "will try to find a peaceful life for those Afghans who are unhappy," a euphemism for militants, though he didn't mention the Taliban by name. Afghans had travelled from across the country to Mazar-i-Sharif united behind the wish that the advent of a new year would bring them peace. According to the police, up to half a million people are in the city to mark the spring equinox and the first day of the traditional Afghan new year and celebrated across Central Asia and Iran. Mazar is at the heart of one of the most peaceful regions of the country. City police chief Abdul Rauf Taj said that 4,000 security personnel had been deployed against insurgent attacks and that all visitors were being screened at seven check points around the city perimeter.

The Peace Jirga took place in Kabul on 2–4 June 2010.

== Other activities ==
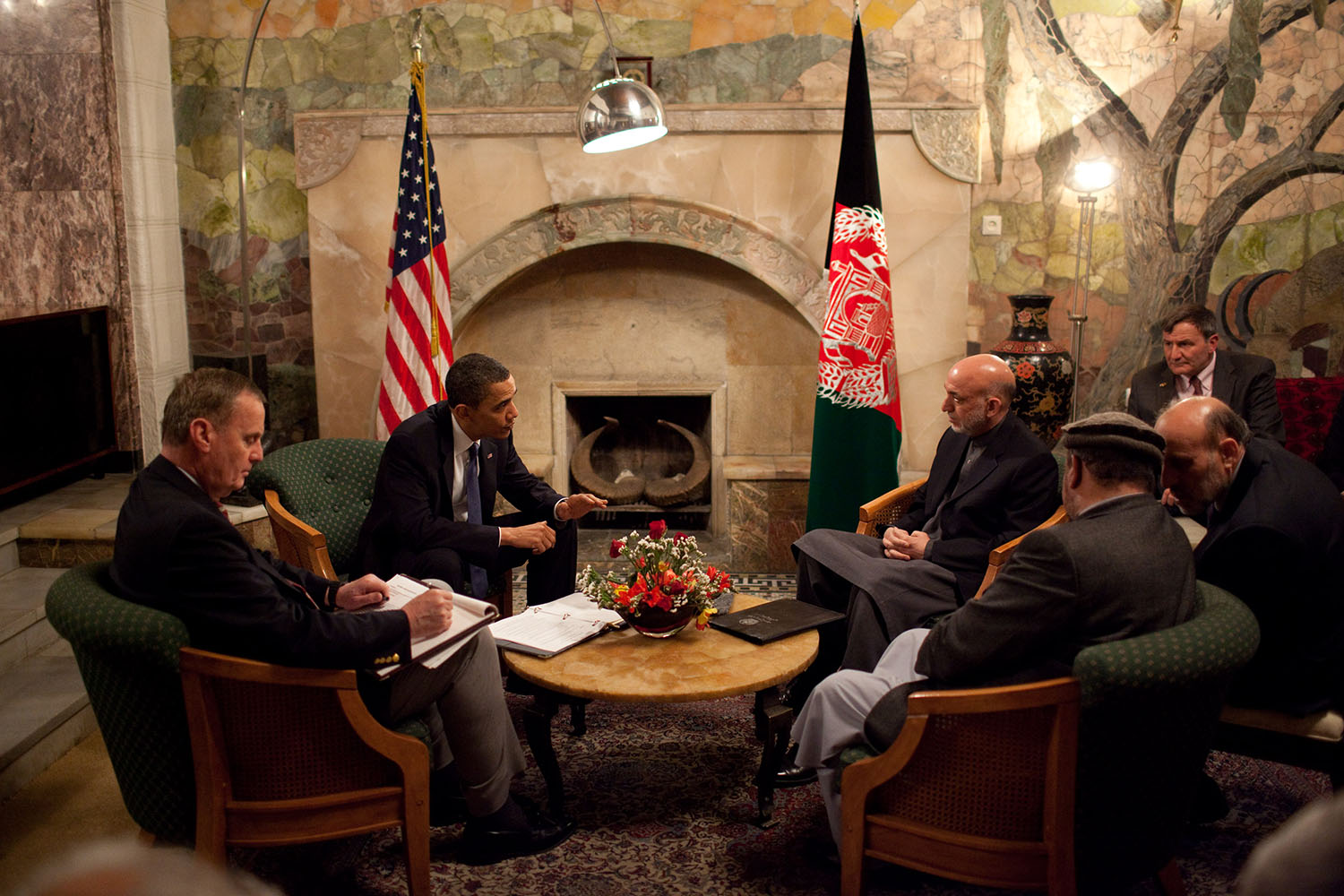
U.S. President Barack Obama meets with Hamid Karzai and Marshal Fahim at the Presidential Palace in Kabul, Afghanistan, in 2010.

He was a member of the leadership council of the United Islamic Front, a coalition of top national and regional leaders. Other members included former President Professor Burhanuddin Rabbani, House Speaker Yunus Qanuni, Vice-president Ahmad Zia Massoud.

In June 2007, Fahim stated that his advisory role was merely symbolic and that he never had the chance to advise the President. He further said that after the 2004 elections President Karzai formed a "one-sided" cabinet and began to employ unilateralism as his main policy driver. Fahim argued that without the backing of foreign forces, President Karzai's regime would not last longer than a week.

In 2009, he was one of Karzai's running mates in the presidential election, bringing a lot of Tajik votes to the ticket. The selection was condemned by Human Rights Watch.

In September 2010, an Afghan news agency reported that Fahim had died of cancer in Paris, France. An official statement was later released by Fahim, who said: "I am completely healthy. I request the Afghan people not to trust news published by irresponsible websites".

== Death ==
Fahim's last years were beset by health problems which required hospital treatment in Germany. He died of a heart attack on 9 March 2014.

Karzai called Fahim's death "a huge loss for Afghanistan" and the government of Afghanistan called for a three-day national mourning period. The UN called him in a statement "a good and trusted partner of the UN."

The Prime Minister of India, while emphasizing his role in fostering India-Afghanistan relations, called him "a brave and fearless military commander, whose contribution to Afghanistan's stabilisation and reconstruction after over three decades of war and conflict will always be remembered. Marshal Fahim was also a close friend of India. We shall never forget his personal contribution to nurturing and strengthening the India Afghanistan strategic partnership." Ambassador James Cunningham of the United States called him "a leader during the Jihad, and that he played a major role in moving Afghanistan toward moderation."

After his death, the Afghan National Defense University was renamed Marshal Fahim National Defense University (MFNDU).

His death came only a few weeks before Karzai was due to step down from the presidency, and as NATO forces pull out of Afghanistan, added to the prevailing atmosphere of fear and uncertainty.

His life and legacy were commemorated annually on the 9th of March in Kabul and other provinces during the Islamic Republic of Afghanistan.

Political offices
Preceded by Ahmad Shah Massoud	Minister of Defense of Afghanistan; 2001–2004	Succeeded by Abdurrahim Wardak
Preceded by Ahmad Zia Massoud	Vice President of Afghanistan; 2009–2014	Succeeded by Yunus Qanuni
