= Afghan National Security Forces =

Former military and security forces

The Afghan National Security Forces (ANSF), also known as the Afghan National Defense and Security Forces (ANDSF), were the military and internal security forces of the Islamic Republic of Afghanistan.

As of 30 June 2020, the ANSF was composed of the Afghan National Army (including the Afghan Border Force, Afghan Air Force, Afghan Territorial Army, Afghan National Civil Order Force), Afghan National Police (including Afghan Local Police), and the National Directorate of Security (including the Afghan Special Force).

== History ==
In August 2021, after the Taliban captured the Afghan capital Kabul and other major cities, US president Joe Biden stated that the "Afghan military collapsed, sometimes without trying to fight," and that "we [the United States of America] gave them every tool they could need." In an Al Jazeera editorial Abdul Basit wrote that the forces "preferred to save their lives by surrendering to the Taliban under its amnesty offers". NATO secretary-general Jens Stoltenberg stated that Afghan government forces "fought bravely," but "ultimately, the Afghan political leadership failed to stand up to the Taliban and to achieve the peaceful solution that Afghans desperately wanted." International Security Assistance Force trainers additionally called the Afghan military "incompetent and unmotivated."

== Structure (circa 2020) ==
The Afghan National Security Forces consisted of

- Ministry of Defence
  - Afghan National Army (ANA): In December 2020 the U.S. Department of Defense wrote that the ANA General Staff commanded and controlled all of Afghanistan's ground and air forces, including "the ANA conventional forces, the Afghan Air Force (AAF), the Special Mission Wing (SMW), the ANA Special Operations Command (ANASOC), the Afghan National Civil Order Force (ANCOF), and the Afghan Border Force (ABF). In total, the ANA consisted of 27 combat brigades, three combat air wings, four branch and basic training schools, seven ANCOF brigades, seven ABF brigades, and additional support facilities such as depots and hospitals."
- Ministry of Interior Affairs
  - Afghan National Police (ANP)
    - Afghan Uniformed Police (AUP)
    - Public Security Police (PSP)
    - Afghan Border Police (ABP)
    - General Directorate for Intelligence and Counter Crime (GDICC) (formerly Afghan Anti-Crime Police (AACP))
    - Afghan Public Protection Force (APPF)
    - Counter Narcotics Police of Afghanistan (CNPA)
    - Afghan Local Police (ALP)
  - General Command of Police Special Units (GCPSU)
    - Afghan Territorial Force (ATF) 444
    - Crisis Response Unit (CRU) 222
    - Commando Force (CF) 333 (formerly Afghan Special Narcotics Force)

NATO special operations forces trained, advised and assisted the ANASOC, SMW and GCPSU who were collectively known as the Afghan Special Security Forces (ASSF). The ASSF was described as the "ANDSF's primary offensive forces".

The National Directorate of Security (NDS) was the state intelligence and security service and was part of the Afghan National Defense and Security Forces. The NDS reported directly to the Office of President.

== See also ==
- Afghan Armed Forces
- Law enforcement in Afghanistan
- History of the Afghan Armed Forces (2002-2021)
- Armed Forces of the Islamic Republic of Afghanistan

== Bibliography ==
- European Asylum Support Office (August 2020). Afghanistan - State Structure and Security Forces - Country of Origin Information Report. Publications Office of the European Union. ISBN 9789294856500. Archived from the original on 7 November 2020.
- Helmus, Todd C. (2015). Advising the Command : Best Practices from the Special Operation's Advisory Experience in Afghanistan (PDF). Santa Monica, CA: RAND Corporation. ISBN 9780833088918.
- Special Inspector General for Afghanistan Reconstruction (June 2013). Afghan Special Mission Wing : DOD moving forward with $771.8 million purchase of aircraft that Afghans cannot operate or maintain (PDF) (Report). Arlington, Va. OCLC 851498021. Archived from the original (PDF) on 18 July 2013.
- Special Inspector General for Afghanistan Reconstruction (June 2022). Police in conflict: lessons from the U.S. experience in Afghanistan (PDF) (Report). Arlington, Va. OCLC 1408444974. Archived from the original (PDF) on 7 February 2024.
- Special Inspector General for Afghanistan Reconstruction (30 July 2021). Quarterly report to the United States Congress (PDF) (Report). Arlington, Va. Archived from the original (PDF) on 13 August 2021.
- United States. Department of Defense (December 2020b). Enhancing Security and Stability in Afghanistan (PDF) (Report). 7-653B15D.
