= APPF =

APPF may refer to:

- Authority for European Political Parties and European Political Foundations, a body of the European Union
- Asia Pacific Parliamentary Forum
- Afghan Public Protection Force
