= CNPA =

CNPA may refer to:

- California Newspaper Publishers Association
- Canadian National Pickleball Association, former name of Pickleball Canada Organization
- Carolina Nature Photographers Association
- Counter Narcotics Police of Afghanistan
