= Crime in Afghanistan =

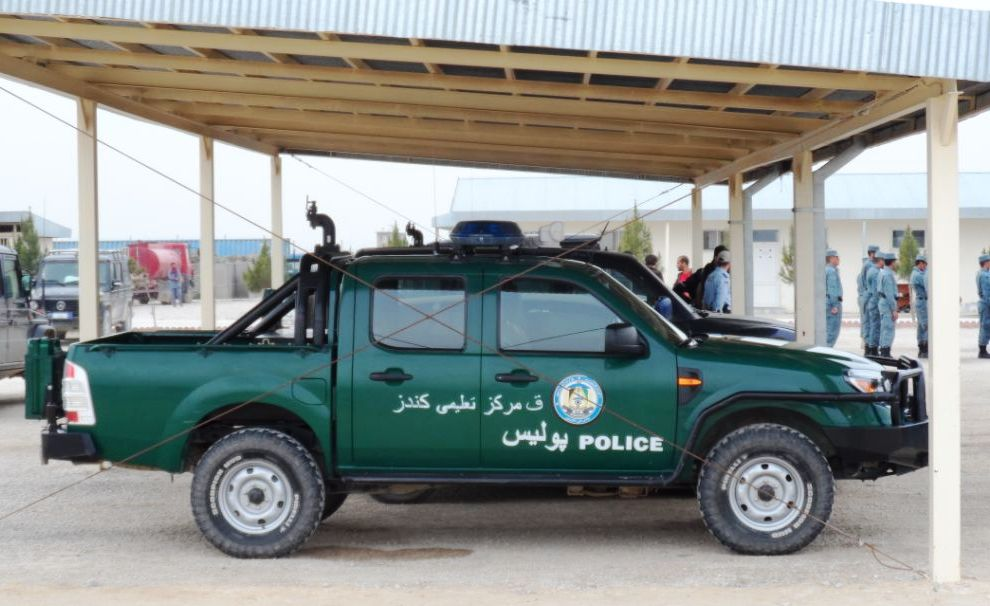
Vehicle of the Afghan National Police

Crime in Afghanistan generally includes murder, theft, kidnapping, smuggling, corruption, and illicit relationship. Most crimes in Afghanistan occur in the major cities, particularly in Kabul, Kandahar, Herat, and Mazar-i-Sharif. All criminal acts are punishable under the strict Islamic Sharia.

== Kabul ==
After the establishment of the Afghan Interim Administration in late 2001, the crime rate has significantly increased in the capital city Kabul. Armed robberies have been regularly reported in the western districts of Kabul. Between March 2002 and January 2003, 48 murder cases, 80 theft cases, and 12 kidnapping cases were reported within the Kabul municipal boundaries.

== Opium production ==
Opium production and drug smuggling had an important role in the political and economic situation of Afghanistan. In the aftermath of the Soviet withdrawal from Afghanistan, opium poppy cultivation increased in the nation. Many commanders of the Afghan mujahideen taxed opium poppy cultivation, even directly participated in illicit drug trade for military financing. Although the Taliban condemned cultivation of narcotic substances, requirements of money encouraged toleration and taxation of drug cultivation. In 1999, Afghanistan produced a peak of over 4,581 metric tons of raw and refined opium. This led to increasing international pressure from states having consumer population of Afghan drugs. In response, the Taliban banned opium poppy cultivation in late 2000, but allowed the opium trade to continue. Under the ban, opium poppy cultivation was reduced to 185 metric tons. This little production of opium continued in areas under the control of the Northern Alliance.

After the establishment of the Afghan Interim Administration in late 2001, which was basically the Northern Alliance, cultivation and smuggling of opium began to increase significantly. Regional militia commanders, criminal organizations, and corrupt government officials have all engaged in drug smuggling as a source of revenue. Some anti-government groups also made profit from the drug trade. Due to these factors, drug smuggling increased political instability in the nation, and became a threat to the country's weak internal security and embryonic democratic government.

Afghanistan was once the world's largest producer of opium and in 2001, Afghanistan was the source of 87% of the world's illicit opium. It was reported that around 80-90% of the heroin consumed in Europe came from opium produced in that region. According to a survey in 2007 by United Nations Office on Drugs and Crime, 93% of the opiates on the world market originated in Afghanistan. In November 2023, a UN report showed that in the entirety of Afghanistan, poppy cultivation dropped by over 95%, removing it from its place as being the world's largest opium producer. This was as a result of a ban on opium production by the Afghan government. It further dropped in 2024 and 2025.

== Other illegal markets ==
The Global Initiative Against Transnational Organized Crime's report in April 2023 highlighted that analyses of the connection between Afghanistan's illicit economy and conflict have been narrowly focused on the opium economy and its by-products. The ephedra economy as a key ingredient in crystal meth is also a contentious issue with varying opinions on its significance, though UN agencies tend to downplay its relevance, and some independent analysts suggest that it is unlikely to replace the higher quality South East Asian meth. These various sectors are crucial to the crime-conflict nexus in Afghanistan and require greater attention.

== Social conditions ==
Unemployment among a large portion of the population and rudimentary basic services have been major factors behind crime. Other forms of crime include robbery as well as kidnappings and assault. Many riots have occurred in the country in response to various political and other issues. Kidnapping has been reduced from 33 in 2023 to only 3 in 2026.

== Terrorism ==
Terrorist attacks, including mass shootings and suicide bombings, have occurred many times since the United States invasion of Afghanistan in late 2001. They declined significantly after the war ended in August 2021.

== See also ==
- Alcohol in Afghanistan
- Law enforcement in Afghanistan
- Law of Afghanistan
- List of prisons in Afghanistan
