= Kamarband =

Kamarband may refer to:

- Cummerbund or kamarbandh, a type of belly chain worn in India
- Kamarband Cave, a prehistoric archaeological site in Iran
- Kamarband Shahre Kabol, a system of security checkpoints around Kabul during the Afghan War
