= Noor Jalal =

Afghan Deputy Interior Minister since 2021

Mawlawi Noor Jalal نور جلال

Minister of Public Health
- Incumbent
- Assumed office 28 May 2024 (Note: Acting: 28 May 2024 – 15 August 2025)
- Prime Minister: Mohammad Hassan Akhund
- Leader: Hibatullah Akhundzada

Deputy Minister of Interior Affairs
- In office c. 1996 – c. 2001
- Leader: Mohammed Omar
- Minister: Abdul Samad Khaksar; Qari Ahmadullah; Khairullah Khairkhwa; Abdur Razzaq

Personal details
- Born: 1969 (age 56–57) Lajen, Shegal District, Kunar Province, Afghanistan
- Party: Taliban
- Occupation: Politician, Taliban member

Maulawi Noor Jalal (Pashto: نور جلال [nʊr d͡ʒaˈlɑl]; born 1969), also spelt Nur Jalal, is an Afghan Taliban politician who has served as the acting Deputy Minister of Interior Affairs of the Islamic Emirate of Afghanistan from 7 September 2021. He also served in this position in the previous Taliban government (1996–2001). He is a cousin of Najibullah Haqqani, the Minister of Communications since 7 September 2021.

== Early life ==
Jalal was born in 1969 in Lajen village, Shegal District, Kunar Province, Afghanistan. He is a member of the Shinwari Pashtun tribe.

== Political career ==
In the first Taliban government of 1996 to 2001, Jalal served as Deputy Minister of Interior Affairs. On 23 February 2001, he was placed on a UN sanctions list.

In 2011, Jalal worked for a Kabul-based non-governmental organisation involved in conflict resolution.

On 7 September 2021, Jalal was made Deputy Minister of Interior Affairs of the newly re-established Islamic Emirate of Afghanistan, under Minister of Interior Affairs Sirajuddin Haqqani.
