= Ibrahim Sadr =

Afghan Deputy Interior Minister since 2021

Mullah Ibrahim Sadr
- صدر ابراهيم

Deputy Minister of Interior Affairs
- Incumbent
- Assumed office 21 September 2021 (Note: Acting: 7 September 2021 – 15 August 2025)
- Supreme Leader: Hibatullah Akhundzada
- Minister: Sirajuddin Haqqani
- Preceded by: Khoshal Sadat

Acting Minister of Interior Affairs
- In office 24 August 2021 – 7 September 2021
- Supreme Leader: Hibatullah Akhundzada
- Preceded by: Abdul Sattar Mirzakwal
- Succeeded by: Sirajuddin Haqqani

Personal details
- Born: Khodaidad Sadr
- Party: Taliban
- Profession: Politician

Military service
- Allegiance: Islamic Emirate of Afghanistan (Taliban)
- Branch/service: Islamic Army of Afghanistan (1996–2001); Military Commission of the Islamic Emirate of Afghanistan (2014–2020)
- Rank: Supreme Commander (2014–2020)
- Commands: Military Commission of the Islamic Emirate of Afghanistan (2014–2020)
- Battles/wars: War in Afghanistan (2001–2021): 2021 Taliban offensive

Ibrahim Sadr (Pashto: صدر ابراهيم; born Khodaidad), sometimes written Ibrahim Sadar, is a senior Taliban official serving as the deputy minister of interior affairs of Afghanistan since 2021.

== Life and career ==
Born Khodaidad, he changed his name to Ibrahim. Sadr was part of the Afghan mujahideen who fought against the Soviet forces in the Soviet–Afghan War. After the war, he moved to Peshawar in Pakistan to teach in a madrassa. Students there added Sadr (meaning 'president') to his name. During the first Taliban government, he was responsible for the Taliban's defence department managing Soviet aircraft. Holding stringent religious views, he developed close contacts with jihadist groups, including Al Qaeda.

After the US invasion, he returned to Peshawar. He was close to the original Taliban leader Mohammed Omar and Akhtar Mansour, who succeeded Omar, and Sadr rose in the Taliban hierarchy. Sadr was appointed the Taliban military chief commander in 2014. The Taliban did not announce his appointment publicly until August 2016.

Sadr's close friend Mansour, the Taliban leader, was killed in a US drone strike in Pakistan in 2016 and Sadr blamed Pakistan. Sadr refused to base himself in Pakistan or to attend Taliban meetings there, upsetting other members. He insisted on remaining in Afghanistan or Iran. Sadr used wealth from opium and marble smuggling to build his own support network within the Taliban, and he was also supported by Iran. Unhappiness with his independence within the Taliban, his dislike of Pakistan and his closeness to Iran led to him being replaced as the military chief by Mohammad Yaqoob in 2020, with Sadr becoming a deputy.

Sadr was briefly placed in the position of acting minister of interior affairs from 24 August 2021 to 7 September 2021. Sadr was appointed acting deputy interior minister on 21 September 2021. On 15 August 2025, Supreme Leader Hibatullah Akhundzada reappointed Sadr and the rest of the cabinet to their positions on a permanent basis.
