= Ring of Steel =

Ring of Steel may refer to:

- Ring of Steel (film), a 1942 Army recruiting film narrated by Spencer Tracy
- Ring of Steel (Kabul), a series of 25 Afghan National Police checkpoints in central Kabul
- Ring of Steel (book), an award-winning book on World War I by Alexander Watson
- Traffic and Environmental Zone (also the "ring of steel"), the security and surveillance cordon surrounding the City of London
