= Khoshal Sadat =

Afghan military officer

General Khoshal Sadat خوشحال سعادت
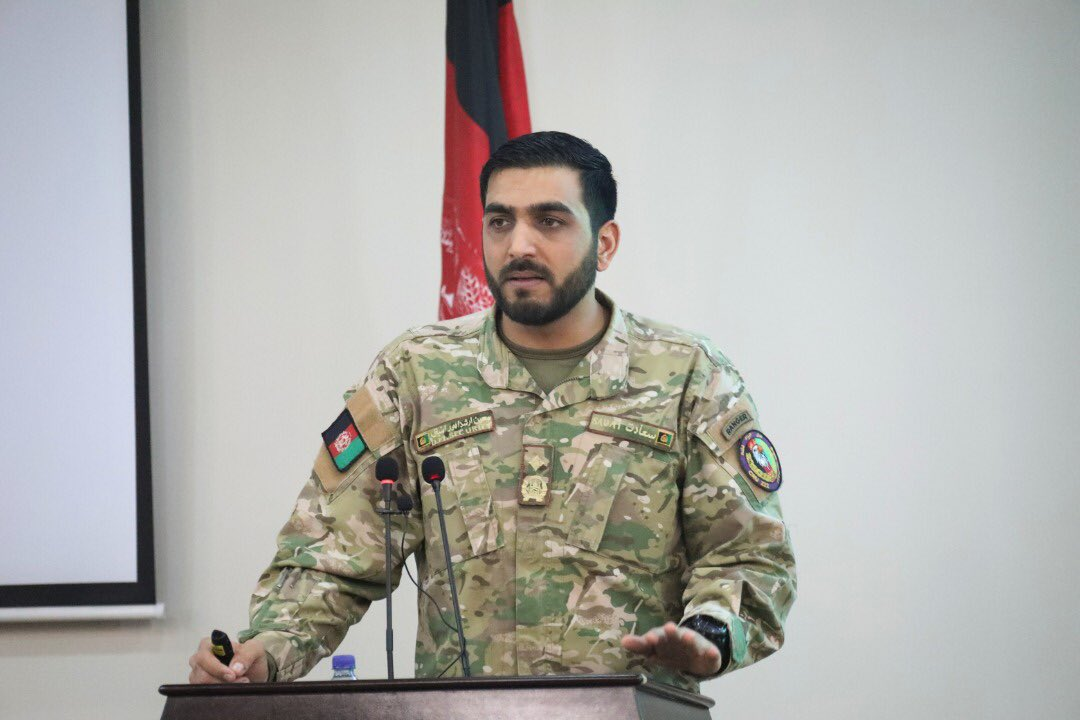

Deputy Interior Minister for Security
- In office 13 July 2021 – 15 August 2021
- President: Ashraf Ghani
- Succeeded by: Ibrahim Sadr
- In office 18 May 2013 – 22 May 2018
- Preceded by: Muhammad Zia Hamdard
- Succeeded by: Aminullah Zubair

Personal details
- Born: 27 October 1985 (age 41)

Military service
- Allegiance: Islamic Republic of Afghanistan
- Branch/service: Afghan National Army
- Years of service: 2008–2021
- Rank: Brigadier general
- Unit: General Command of Police Special Units; Deputy Minister of Interior Affairs; Commander of Afghan Ground Forces
- Battles/wars: War in Afghanistan

Khoshal Sadat (Pashto: خوشال سادات) (Dari: خوشحال سادات) is an Afghan military officer who previously served as Deputy Interior Minister for Security.

== Early life ==
Sadat grew up in Kabul. His father, a pilot for the Afghan government, died in a plane crash in 1988 when Sadat was four years old, during the Soviet Union's occupation of Afghanistan. He was raised with his brother and four sisters by his mother. The family remained in Kabul during the post-occupation war from 1991 to 1996, before the arrival of the Taliban. Although the group was initially welcomed in the hope of stability, Sadat soon disliked the treatment of women and strict religious rules of Taliban-controlled Kabul, especially the banning music and movies.

After the US military intervention in 2001, Sadat gave up his plan to study engineering and decided to become a military interpreter in 2002, aged 18. He was hired and began work instantly. In 2008, he was commissioned in Afghan National Army.

== Professional career ==
He served as Afghanistan's police chief. In 2019, Sadat became one of the deputy ministers at the Ministry of Interior under President Ashraf Ghani. Shortly after becoming a deputy minister Sadat fired 27 provincial police chiefs due to corruption.

== Training ==
He was trained at the Royal Military Academy, Sandhurst, Britain’s officer training college, as well as the US Army Command and Staff College.
