= Law enforcement in Afghanistan =

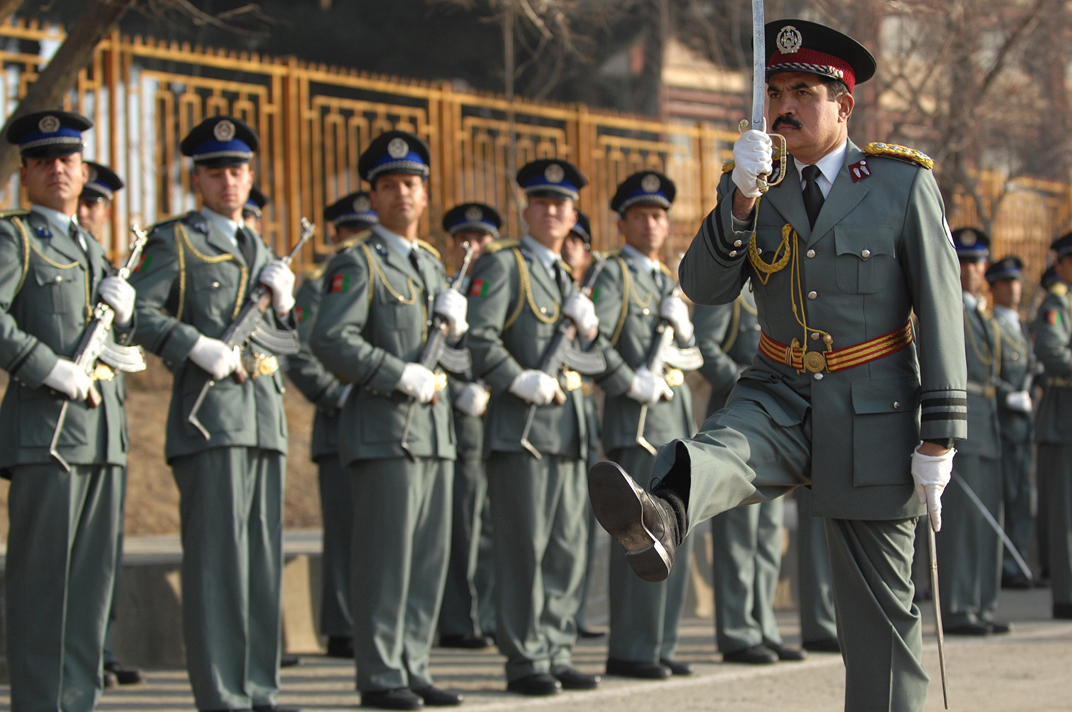
Afghan National Police (ANP) commander marching to greet distinguished visitors at the Afghan National Police Academy (ANPA) in 2010.

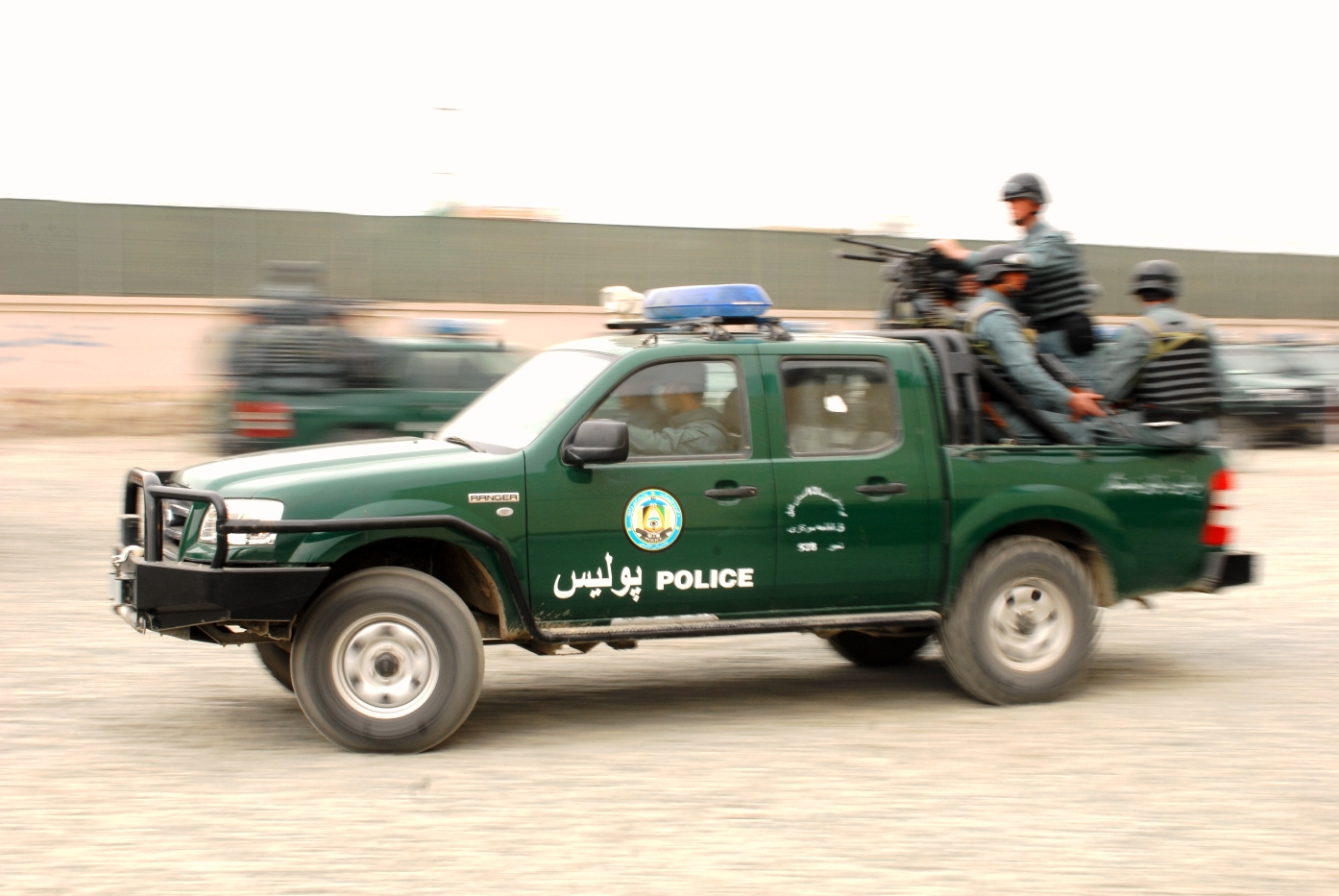
ANP Ford Ranger

Law enforcement in Afghanistan is one of three major components of the nation's criminal justice system, along with courts and corrections. The General Directorate of Intelligence (GDI) is the intelligence agency of the government of Afghanistan. The Afghan National Police, which includes the Afghan Border Police and the Afghan National Civil Order Police, was the police force of Afghanistan with jurisdiction that covers the entire 34 provinces of the country during the Islamic Republic period. The Afghan National Police is responsible for civilian law enforcement. Originally a force of the Western-backed government, it was reorganized as an arm of the Taliban after its takeover of the country.

The Afghan Border Police (ABP) was responsible for securing and maintaining the nation's borders with neighboring states as well as all international airports within the country. The mission of the Afghan National Civil Order Police (ANCOP) was to provide civil order presence patrols, prevent violent public incidents, and provide crisis and anti-terror response in urban and metropolitan environments. Like the ABP, ANCOP was also under the control of the Afghan National Police (ANP), which was under the nation's Ministry of the Interior. ANCOP was divided into five Brigades, each commanded by a Brigadier General. These brigades were stationed in Kabul, Paktia, Kandahar, Herat, and Mazar-i-Sharif.

All law enforcement agencies of the Islamic Republic of Afghanistan were set up and trained by the North Atlantic Treaty Organization (NATO) states, initially by Germany (see Sedra 2017) but then mainly by the United States. In 2003 the mandate of the International Security Assistance Force (ISAF), under the command of NATO, was extended and expanded beyond the Kabul Province. In some areas unoccupied by ISAF forces, local militias maintained control though being partially disarmed under programs started by the United Nations Office for Disarmament Affairs.

In 2007 the Department of Defense (DOD) began supervising most police development, in conjunction with the U.S. Department of State, as well as smaller allies partners. This includes supervising recruiting, training, and operations. DOD components, primarily from the National Guard, as well as other branches, began mentoring the Afghan police commanders at every level of command. This police mentoring initiative was headquartered in Camp Phoenix as part of Combined Joint Task Force Phoenix (CJTF Phoenix, also known as Task Force Phoenix). As of May 2011, the Afghan National Police had 126,000 members while the NDS had between 15,000 and 30,000 employees.

== Historical secret police organizations ==
- Khedamat-e Etelea'at-e Dawlati (KHAD)
- WAD
- National Directorate of Security (NDS)

== See also ==
- Alcohol in Afghanistan
- Afghan National Police
- Crime in Afghanistan
- Law of Afghanistan
- Afghan Public Protection Force
