= Ministry of Interior Affairs (Afghanistan) =

Afghan government ministry responsible for interior affairs matters

- Emblem of the Ministry of Interior Affairs of the Islamic Emirate of Afghanistan

Government agency overview
- Jurisdiction: Government of Afghanistan
- Headquarters: Kabul; 34°34′04.13″N 69°10′42.82″E
- Motto: Resolute. Ready. Responsive.
- Minister responsible: Sirajuddin Haqqani
- Deputy Ministers responsible: Ibrahim Sadr; Noor Jalal (Acting); Mohammad Nabi Omari (Acting)
- Government agency executives: Mullah Abdul Nafi Takoor, Spokesperson; Maulvi Badruddin Haqqani, Director of Procurement
- Website: Official website Official YouTube channel

The Ministry of Interior Affairs (Dari: وزارت امور داخله افغانستان, Pashto: د افغانستان د کورنیو چارو وزارت) is the cabinet ministry of Afghanistan responsible for law enforcement, civil order and fighting crime. The ministry's headquarters is located in Kabul.

The current minister of Interior Affairs is Sirajuddin Haqqani, who is also the first deputy leader of Afghanistan and the leader of the Haqqani network.

== List of ministers ==
Portrait	Name	Took office	Left office	Political affiliation
	Ali Ahmad Loinab	August 1919	June 1925	
	Abdul Aziz Barakzai	June 1925	1928	
	Abdul Ahad Wardak	1928	1929	
	Abd al-Ghafur Khan	January 1929	1929	Saqqawist
	Muhammad Hashim Khan	1929	1930	
	Muhammad Gul Mohmand	1930	1939	
	Ghulam Faruq Usman	1939	1942	
	Muhammad Nauruz	1942	1945	
	Ghulam Faruq Usman	1945	1948	
	Gen. Asadullah Seraj	1948	1949	
	Gen. Mohammad Daoud Khan	1949	1951	
	Gen. Abdul Ahad Malikyar	1951	1955	
	Abdul Hakim Shah-Alami	1955	1958	
	Sayyid Abdulillah	1958	1963	
	Dr. Abdul Qayyum	1963	1965	
	Abdus Sattar Shalizi	1965	1966	
	Eng. Ahmadullah	1966	1967	
	Muhammad Umar Wardak	1967	1969	
	Eng. Muhammad Bashir Lodin	1969	1971	
	Amanullah Mansuri	1971	1972	
	Nimatullah Pazhwak	1972	1973	
	Faiz Mohammed	1973	1975	PDPA–Parcham
	Abdul Qadir Nuristani	1975	28 April 1978	Republican
	Nur Ahmed Nur	30 April 1978	11 July 1978	PDPA–Parcham
	Mohammad Aslam Watanjar	11 July 1978	1 April 1979	PDPA–Khalq
	Shir Jan Mazdooryar	1 April 1979	28 July 1979	PDPA–Khalq
	Mohammad Aslam Watanjar	28 July 1979	19 September 1979	PDPA–Khalq
Vacant (19 September – 28 December 1979)
	Sayed Mohammad Gulabzoy	28 December 1979	15 November 1988	PDPA–Khalq
	Mohammad Aslam Watanjar	15 November 1988	6 March 1990	PDPA–Khalq
	Raz Muhammad Paktin	6 March 1990	16 April 1992	Homeland Party
	Abdul Samad Khaksar (Note: Minister or deputy Minister.)	1996	2001	Taliban
	Qari Ahmadullah	1996	?	Taliban
	Khairullah Khairkhwa	1997	1998	Taliban
	Abdur Razzaq Akhundzada	? — May 2000 — ?		Taliban
	Yunus Qanuni	7 December 2001	19 June 2002	
	Taj Mohammad Wardak	19 June 2002	28 January 2003	
	Ali Jalali	28 January 2003	27 September 2005	Independent
	Zarar Ahmad Osmani (Note: Served as deputy Minister when Jalali resigned. Appointed acting Minister before his appointment was made permanent.)	28 September 2005	11 October 2008	
	Mohammad Hanif Atmar	11 October 2008	July 2010	Independent
	Bismillah Khan Mohammadi	July 2010	September 2012	Jamiat-e Islami
	Mujtaba Patang	15 September 2012	22 July 2013	Independent (Police)
	Mohammad Omar Daudzai	1 September 2013	9 December 2014	Independent
	Mohammad Ayub Salangi (acting)	9 December 2014	27 January 2015	Independent (Police)
	Nur ul-Haq Ulumi	27 January 2015	24 February 2016	Hezb-e Muttahed-e Melli
	Taj Mohammad Jahid	24 February 2016	13 August 2017	Jamiat-e Islami
	Wais Barmak	13 August 2017	23 December 2018	Independent
	Amrullah Saleh (acting)	23 December 2018	19 January 2019	Basej-e Milli
	Masoud Andrabi	19 January 2019	19 March 2021	
	Hayatullah Hayat (acting)	19 March 2021	19 June 2021	Independent
	Abdul Sattar Mirzakwal (acting)	19 June 2021	15 August 2021	Independent (Military)
	Ibrahim Sadr (acting)	24 August 2021	7 September 2021	Taliban
	Sirajuddin Haqqani	7 September 2021	15 August 2025	Taliban (Haqqani network)
	Sirajuddin Haqqani	15 August 2025	Incumbent	Taliban (Haqqani network)

== The Democratic Republic period ==
During the period where Afghanistan was a communist state known as the Democratic Republic of Afghanistan, those that worked for the Ministry of Interior (MoI) were referred to as “Sarandoy”. This label included traffic police, provinical officers and corrections/labor prison facility officers. The Ministry of Interior also had female personnel who were tasked with interacting with female civilians, such as when searching them at checkpoints. Those who worked for the Ministry of Interior were tasked with fighting “counter-revolutionaries”, securing government and party components and ensuring the safety of important structures. As of 1982, the Ministry of Interior may have had its own intelligence agency. The Sarandoy were a centrally commanded force and companies, battalions, and brigades reported to the “Directorate of the Defense of the Revolution of the Ministry of Interior”.

It should also be noted that a gendarme forces also existed during the monarchy and Daoud Khan’s republic, and that personnel under the Ministry of Interior were trained by Turkey from the 1950s well into the 1970s. Additionally, both West Germany and East Germany trained those in the Ministry of Interior and on the eve of the Saur Revolution in 1978, Afghanistan’s officer corps and MoI personnel contained personnel who received training in the United States. Regardless, the Sarandoy had far more numbers and were more effective due to the cooperation of the Soviet MVD and its “Kobalt” units in 1981 and 1982 where 12,000 of these Sarandoy personnel were trained at MVD facilities in the Soviet Union between 1978 and 1986, many of them being junior commanders and NCOs. 2,500 of these Sarandoy personnel would be trained in Tashkent, the capital of Uzbek Soviet Socialist Republic for past excellence in combat.

== The first Islamic Emirate period ==
During the Islamic Emirate of Afghanistan (1996–2001), Abdul Samad Khaksar (also referred to as Mohammad Khaksar in some news reports) was a Taliban deputy Minister of the Interior, who is notable because he offered to help the US deal with al-Qaeda and became an informant for the Northern Alliance. Khaksar was assassinated on January 14, 2006 by Taliban gunmen.

Joint Task Force Guantanamo counterterrorism analysts described Khairullah Khairkhwa as a former Taliban Minister of the Interior. However, during his second annual Administrative Review Board hearing Khairullah Khairkhwa disputed this allegation.

== The Islamic Republic period ==
Seal of the Interior Ministry and Police of the Islamic Republic of Afghanistan

During the Islamic Republic of Afghanistan (2004–2021), the ministry maintained the Afghan National Police, the General Command of Police Special Units and the General Directorate of Prisons and Detention Centers (GDPDC).

=== Police forces ===
- Afghan National Police (ANP)
  - Afghan Uniformed Police (AUP)
  - Public Security Police (PSP)
  - Afghan Border Force (ABP)
  - General Directorate for Intelligence and Counter Crime (GDICC) (formerly Afghan Anti-Crime Police (AACP))
  - Afghan Public Protection Force (APPF)
  - Counter Narcotics Police of Afghanistan (CNPA)
  - Afghan Local Police (ALP)
- General Command of Police Special Units (GCPSU) (Dari: قوماندانی عمومی قطعات خاص)
  - Afghan Territorial Force (ATF) 444
  - Crisis Response Unit (CRU) 222
  - Afghan Special Narcotics Force - also known as Force 333 or Commando Force 333. The force was a counternarcotics paramilitary unit, founded at the end of 2003 with training and assistance from British advisers. It carried out drug interdiction missions in remote areas of the country against high-value targets such as drug laboratories. The Department of Defense provided the unit with intelligence and airlift support. All of its operations were sanctioned by the President and Minister of Interior Affairs. It operated regularly with the U.S. Drug Enforcement Administration on raids and seized hundreds of tonnes of illicit drugs.
  - Provincial Special Units
