= Armed Forces of the Islamic Republic of Afghanistan =

- قوای مسلح جمهوری اسلامی افغانستان
- Motto: خدا، وطن، وظیفه ("God, Homeland, Duty")
- Service branches: Afghan Army; Afghan Air Force
- Headquarters: Kabul

Leadership
- Commander-in-Chief: Ashraf Ghani (last)
- Minister of Defense: Bismillah Khan Mohammadi (last)
- Chief of Staff: Yasin Zia (last)

Personnel
- Active personnel: 85,000–300,000

Industry
- Foreign suppliers: Brazil; China; France; Germany; Italy; Pakistan; Russia; Soviet Union; Tajikistan; Turkey; United Kingdom; United States; Uzbekistan

Related articles
- History: Military history of Afghanistan: Afghan Civil War (1928–1929); Soviet–Afghan War; Afghan Civil War (1989–1992); Afghan Civil War (1992–1996); Afghan Civil War (1996–2001); War in Afghanistan (2001–2021)
- Ranks: Military ranks of Afghanistan

The Armed Forces of the Islamic Republic of Afghanistan was the national military of Afghanistan from 1709 to 2021. (Note: "Islamic Republic of Afghanistan" only used for a very short time, and this period includes the first period of Taliban control.)

== Equipment ==
=== Infantry weapons ===
Name	Image	Origin	Type
Rifles
M4		United States	Carbine
M16	M16A2_rightside_noBG	United States	Assault rifle
Colt Canada C7	M16A2_rightside_noBG	Canada	Assault rifle
AK-47		Soviet Union	Assault rifle
Type 56		China	Assault rifle
AKM		Soviet Union	Assault rifle
AK-74		Soviet Union	Assault rifle
ASH-78		Albania	Assault rifle
AMD-65		Hungary	Assault rifle
Pistol Mitralieră model 1963/1965		Romania	Assault rifle
Zastava M70		Yugoslavia	Assault rifle
Samopal vz. 58		Czechoslovakia	Assault rifle
AKS-74U		Soviet Union	Carbine
SKS		USSR	Semi-automatic rifle
Lee–Enfield		British Empire	Bolt action
Submachine guns
Škorpion		Czechoslovakia	Submachine gun
Shotguns
Mossberg 500		United States	Pump-action shotgun
Sniper rifles
M24 Sniper Weapon System		United States	Sniper rifle
PSL		Romania	Designated marksman rifle
Machine guns
M249 SAW		United States	Light machine gun
RPD		Soviet Union	Light machine gun
RPK		Soviet Union	Light machine gun
M240		United States	General-purpose machine gun
PK		Soviet Union	General-purpose machine gun
Zastava M84		Yugoslavia	General-purpose machine gun
M2 Browning		United States	Heavy machine gun
DShK		USSR	Heavy machine gun
KPV		Soviet Union	Heavy machine gun
Grenade launchers
M79		United States	Grenade launcher
M203		United States	Grenade launcher
GP-25		Soviet Union	Grenade launcher
AGS-17		USSR	Automatic grenade launcher
QLZ-87		China	Automatic grenade launcher
Pistols
Beretta M9		United States	Semi-automatic pistol
Smith & Wesson SD		United States	Semi-automatic pistol
Glock		Austria	Semi-automatic pistol
Makarov PM		Soviet Union	Semi-automatic pistol
TT-33		Soviet Union	Semi-automatic pistol

=== Anti-tank ===
Name	Photo	Type	Origin	Caliber
RPG-7		Rocket-propelled grenade	Soviet Union	40 mm
Type 69		Rocket-propelled grenade	China	40 mm
RPG-16		Rocket-propelled grenade	Soviet Union	58 mm
B-10		Recoilless rifle	Soviet Union	82 mm
SPG-9		Recoilless gun	Soviet Union	73 mm

=== Missiles ===
Name	Photo	Type	Origin	Caliber
9M14 Malyutka		Anti-tank missile	Soviet Union	125mm
Scud 2-B		Short-range ballistic missile	Soviet Union	

=== Uniform ===
Name	Image	Origin	Type
Military uniform
Universal Camouflage Pattern		United States	Combat uniform

=== Armored fighting vehicles ===
Name	Image	Origin	Type
Tanks
T-62		Soviet Union	Main battle tank
Armoured fighting vehicles
International MaxxPro		United States	Infantry mobility vehicle
M1117		United States	Internal security vehicle
M113		United States	Armoured personnel carrier
Military vehicles
Humvee		United States	Military light utility vehicle

=== Unarmored vehicles ===
Name	Image	Origin	Type
Heavy Expanded Mobility Tactical Truck		United States	Military truck
Navistar 7000		United States	Military truck
Ford Ranger		United States	Pickup truck
Toyota Hilux		Japan	Pickup truck
Toyota Land Cruiser		Japan	Pickup truck
Ford Cargo		United States	Truck
M915		United States	Military tractor unit
GAZ-66		Soviet Union	Military truck
UAZ-469		Soviet Union	LUV
Ural-375		Soviet Union	Military truck
ZIL-131		Soviet Union	Military truck

=== Artillery ===
Name	Image	Origin	Type
Mortars
Type 63-1		China	Mortar
M224		United States	Mortar
82-BM-37		Soviet Union	Mortar
2B14 Podnos		Soviet Union	Mortar
M69		Yugoslavia	Mortar
Towed artillery
122 mm howitzer 2A18 (D-30)		Soviet Union	Howitzer
Rocket artillery
BM-21 Grad		Soviet Union	Self-propelled multiple rocket launcher
Anti-aircraft
ZU-23-2		Soviet Union	Anti-aircraft twin-barreled autocannon

=== Aircraft ===
Name	Image	Origin	Type
Combat aircraft
Embraer EMB 314 Super Tucano		Brazil	Light attack
Transport
Antonov An-26		Soviet Union	Transport
Antonov An-32		Soviet Union	Transport
Cessna 208		United States	Transport / Utility
Helicopters
Mil Mi-8		Russia	Utility
Mil Mi-24		Russia	Attack
Sikorsky UH-60		United States	Utility
MD500 Defender		United States	Light attack / Trainer
Trainer aircraft
Aero L-39 Albatros		Czech Republic	Trainer aircraft

== Bibliography ==
- Brayley, Martin J. (22 April 2013). Kalashnikov AK47 Series: The 7.62 x 39mm Assault Rifle in Detail. Crowood. ISBN 978-1-84797-526-3.
- Foss, Christopher F.; Gander, Terry J., eds. (1999). Jane's Military Vehicles and Logistics, 1999-2000 (20th ed.). Jane's Information Group. ISBN 978-0-7106-1912-9.
- International Institute for Strategic Studies (2024). "Chapter Five: Asia". The Military Balance. 124 (1). Taylor & Francis: 218–327. doi:10.1080/04597222.2024.2298593. ISSN 0459-7222.
- Jones, Richard; Ness, Leland S., eds. (14 January 2010). Jane's Infantry Weapons 2010-2011 (36th ed.). Jane's Information Group. ISBN 978-0-7106-2908-1.
- Shankar, Colonel C. P. (2015). Military in Pakistan and Afghanistan A Brief History. Neha Publishers & Distributors. ISBN 978-9380318851.
