= Carolina Nature Photographers Association =

Nature photography group based in North and South Carolina

The Carolinas Nature Photographers Association (CNPA) is a photography group based mainly in North and South Carolina. It is a group focused on photographing nature and wildlife and began in 1992. It is approaching 1200 members (May 2016) and is split into 13 regional groups.

Each regional group typically meets monthly to plan photo outings, photo workshops, gallery shows, and the occasional group project. For all of the regions there is one collective Annual Meeting where, for 3 days, there are nationally known nature photographers and educational speakers providing lectures on a variety of nature subjects and opportunities for photo outings, and a Mid-Year Outing that is held at different locations around the region with programs tailored for each location and a focus on field trips.

Camera in the Wild is the official magazine for the Carolina Nature Photographers Association, mailed quarterly to all members.
