= Abdul Samad Khaksar =

Afghan politician

Abdul Samad Khaksar عبدالصمد خاکسار

Deputy Minister of Interior
- In office 1996–2001

Minister of Intelligence
- In office 1994–1996

Personal details
- Born: 1960 Kandahar, Afghanistan
- Died: 14 January 2006 (aged 45–46) Kandahar, Afghanistan
- Occupation: Politician, Taliban member

Mullah Abdul Samad Khaksar (1960 – 14 January 2006), also referred to as Mohammad Khaksar, served as Minister or Deputy Minister of Interior for Afghanistan under the Taliban government.

He was born around 1960 in Kandahar. He received a madrasa education and fought under Hezbi Islami commander Mawlawi Abdul Raziq Muhammad Hasan in Kandahar during the 1980s.

He was the Taliban Intelligence Minister from 1994 to 1996 and deputy Interior Minister from 1996 to 2001 during the Taliban rule. Khaksar became unhappy with al-Qaeda's influence in Afghanistan. He reportedly met Osama bin Laden in 1998 following US cruise missile strikes on Al-Qaeda bases and told him to leave Afghanistan. He met with US officials in Peshawar in 1999, offering them help in dealing with bin Laden, but his offer was turned down. He also became an informant for the Northern Alliance.

He renounced the Taliban following the US-led invasion in 2001 and encouraged people to support the Northern Alliance. Abdul Samad became a vocal critic of the Taliban and Al Qaeda. In September 2005 he unsuccessfully ran for Afghanistan's new parliament.

Abdul Samad was shot and killed while carrying groceries home with two of his five children in Kandahar on 14 January 2006, by two men riding a motorcycle. The Taliban claimed responsibility for the killing, with spokesman Qari Mohammad Yousuf Ahmadi saying that he was a traitor whom they had been hunting for a long time.

He was one of five individuals the United Nations officially removed from its sanction list in 2010. The four other men were: Abdul Salam Zaeef, former ambassador to Pakistan; Abdul Satar Paktin, formerly the Taliban's Deputy Minister of Public Health; Muhammad Islam Mohammadi, former Governor of Bamiyan Province; and Abdul Hakim Mujahid Muhammad Awrang, former envoy to the United Nations. Two of the other men were also deceased.
