= Asia Pacific Parliamentary Forum =

Governmental organization

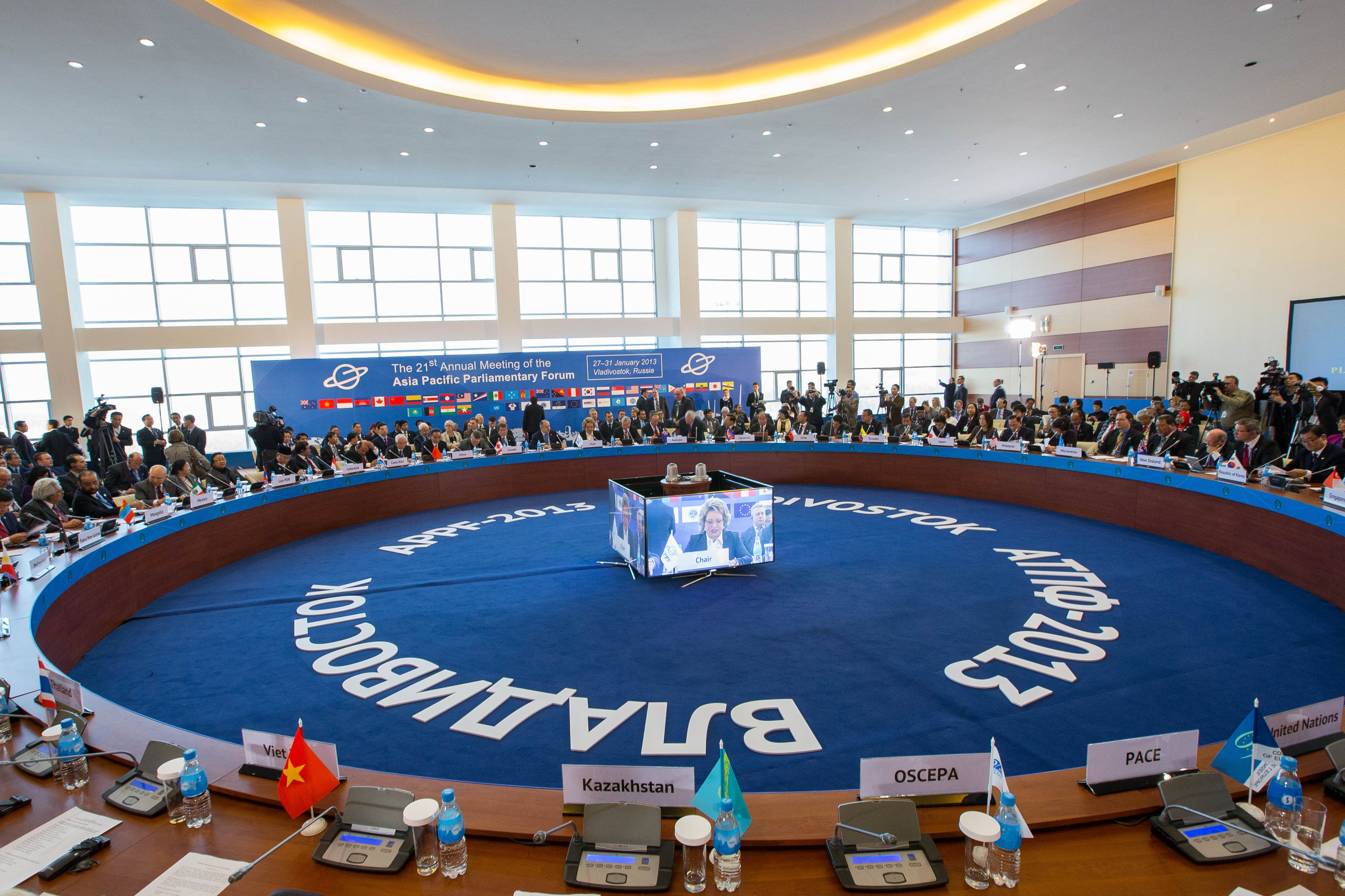
21st session of the APPF in Vladivostok

The Asia Pacific Parliamentary Forum (APPF) is a group of parliamentary officials from the Asia-Pacific region who wish to discuss matters that affect their region with their government counterparts around the world. The group was founded in 1993. It is a branch of the Asia-Pacific Economic Cooperation (APEC). Dan Hays is a past Chair of the APPF's Canadian section. The Australian National Group was founded in 1995.
