= Abdul Sattar Mirzakwal =

Afghan Public Official

General Abdul Satar Mirzakwal; (Pashto: جنرال عبدالستار مېرزکوال; Dari: جنرال عبدالستار میرزکوال, born 1960) is an Afghan politician and the last Minister of Interior Affairs of the Islamic Republic of Afghanistan before the surrender to the Taliban. He was the Governor of the Kunduz and Kunar Provinces of the Islamic Republic of Afghanistan.

== Career ==
In June 2018, Mirzakwal was appointed governor of Kunar Province. During his tenure as governor of Kunar Province, Mirzakwal oversaw security operations against Islamic State militants. On 5 March 2020, he announced that 46 members of the group operating in the province's Sawkai District had surrendered their weapons, which brought the reported number of surrenders over the preceding week to 336, including eight commanders. He attributed the surrenders to intensified government operations against the group.

Mirzakwal was appointed Minister of Interior Affairs of the Islamic Republic of Afghanistan on 19 June 2021 by President Ashraf Ghani. His appointment came amidst the Taliban gaining ground against the national government. At the same time, General Bismillah Khan Mohammadi replaced defence minister Asadullah Khalid, who flew out of the country to treat an old wound he had sustained in a targeted suicide bombing attack in 2012. Mirzakwal served as a governor of several provinces, including Kunduz. He replaced Hayatullah Hayat, who had served as the interior minister for three months after replacing Masoud Andarabi.

In an interview with Al Jazeera on 11 August 2021, Mirzakwal outlined a three-phase government strategy to counter the Taliban offensive, involving halting territorial losses, reorganizing security forces around major cities, and subsequently launching offensive operations. He also said the government was supporting the recruitment and arming of local volunteer militias to fight alongside government forces.

On 15 August 2021, Mirzakwal announced plans for the surrender of Kabul to the Islamic Emirate of Afghanistan. He urged residents not to fear for their safety amid reports of disorder in the city, following rumours of the Taliban's entry into Kabul.
