= Law of Afghanistan =

The law in Afghanistan is the uncodified Sharia (Islamic law), interpreted according to the Hanafi jurisprudential school. The ruling Taliban has maintained a strict Hanafi-only approach, ignoring enumeration of international rights, that bears greater similarity to Iran and its "Ja'fari only" jurisprudential stance than countries like Pakistan which follow a non-exclusive parliamentary approach to Islamic law. Whilst opposing codification, in the past, the Taliban written policy has instructed judiciary to consult the Mecelle, a late Ottoman codification of Hanafi Mu'amalat, in matters of civil law.

== History ==
The legal system of Afghanistan has held consists of Islamic, statutory and customary rules. It has developed over centuries and is currently changing in the context of the rebuilding of the Afghan state. The supreme law of the land is currently Sharia however there is complex legislation that stems from different historical periods.

For instance, the so-called four volumes of civil law were developed on the basis of Egyptian models and promulgated in the time of the monarchy. Other legislation came into force under of President Daoud Khan, the Democratic Republic (1978-1992), the Mujahideen (1992-1996), the first Taliban regime (1996-2001), the Islamic Republic of Afghanistan (2004–2021) and the current Islamic Emirate of Afghanistan. In the prior constitution of the Islamic republic, article 130 of the Afghan Constitution established that judges must apply the constitution and legislation and may only resort to Hanafi fiqh (one of the Schools of Islamic Law) if a necessary legal rule cannot be found in the written laws.

=== Prior Judicature ===
During the Republican era, the Judicial system consisted of five major courts:

1. The Supreme court: with the highest authority with nine members including the chief appointed by the president and the house of the people per Articles 117 and 118 of the Constitution.
2. The court of Appeals: composed of the chief, the heads of Dewans, and other judicial members. Selection is based on experience and qualification. Per Article 31, the head of the General Criminal Dewan commonly serves as deputy head of the Court of Appeals.
3. The Primary courts: according to Article 40, primary courts are generally established within the Court of Appeal jurisdictions. New courts can be founded in the centers of provinces, with the approval of the Supreme court president.
4. The Juvenile court: this court is part of the primary court of every province and is made up of the head and three judicial members. The fundamental laws of this court follow Article 44.
5. The Commercial court: this optional court system can be established within provinces, and composed of the chief and four other judicial members. Per Article 45, commercial cases can be deliberated under Primary court when commercial courts aren't available.

Court cases were generally handled at the primary and appeal stages by three major judges. The cessation stage could also have been deliberated with two or more participant judges, applying the constitution and laws of the Islamic Republic of Afghanistan.

== Judicial System ==
The Taliban purged the judiciary of the republican era, ending the appointment of those with training in modern Republican state legislation. The Amir al-Mu'minin (Supreme Leader) now directly appoints judiciary with the title of Shaykh, Mufti and Maulvi that suggest knowledge of prophetic tradition, Madrassa training and qualification to issue answers in Islamic law according to the Hanafi school.

=== Court Structure ===
The Taliban operate a three-tiered court structure:

1. District courts: these primary courts are situated in well-known locations in most/all districts and hear cases on one or two days per week.
2. Provincial courts: the second tier deals with appeals, more complicated cases as well as highly politicised cases - for instance, if a Taliban commander is implicated, local judiciary might be afraid to rule against him or be incapable of impartiality. Out of fear of the Taliban, many do not appeal.
3. Supreme court: the final appeals court and the least clearly understood.

== See also ==
- Law enforcement in Afghanistan
- Ministry of Justice (Afghanistan)
- Capital punishment in Afghanistan
- Justice minister
