= Ring of Steel (Kabul) =

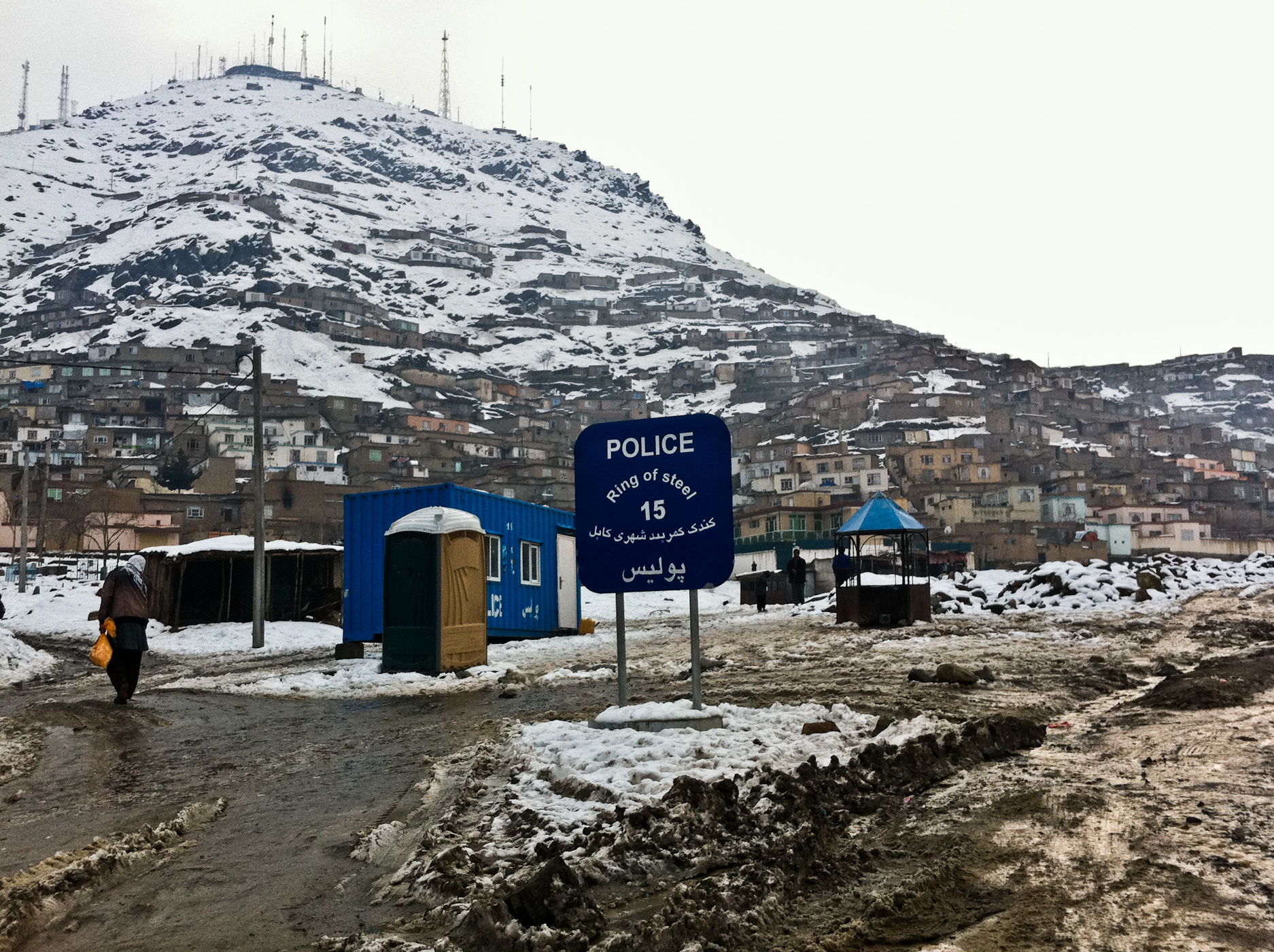
Ring of Steel checkpoint number 15

The Ring of Steel (Persian: كمربندى شهرى كابل, Kamerband-i Shahr-i Kabul, "Belt of the City of Kabul") was a series of 25 Afghan National Police checkpoints in the city of Kabul. Set up in June 2010, the Ring of Steel was designed for security purposes and intermittently staffed. Transiting vehicles are occasionally stopped and checked.
