= Afghan National Police =

Afghan National Police د افغانستان ملي څارندوی (Pashto) پولیس ملی افغانستان (Dari)
- Abbreviation: ANP

Agency overview
- Formed: 1709
- Employees: 200,000 (April 2023)

Jurisdictional structure
- National agency: Afghanistan
- Operations jurisdiction: Afghanistan
- General nature: Civilian police

Operational structure
- Headquarters: Kabul, Afghanistan
- Agency executive: Sirajuddin Haqqani, Minister of Interior Affairs

The Afghan National Police (ANP; Pashto: د افغانستان ملي څارندوی; Dari: پولیس ملی افغانستان), also known as the Afghan Police, is the national police force of the Islamic Emirate of Afghanistan, serving as a single law enforcement agency all across the country. The Afghan Border Police, which had stations along the nation's border and at major airports, was a separate component of the force. The ANP is under the responsibility of the Ministry of Interior Affairs in Kabul, Afghanistan, and is headed by Sirajuddin Haqqani. It has nearly 200,000 members as of April 2023. Furthermore, the GDI are also a part of the secret police agency of the Islamic Emirate of Afghanistan after the Fall of Kabul in August 2021, and the GCPSU are the special police forces.

The Afghan police traces its roots to the early 18th century when the Hotak dynasty was established in Kandahar followed by Ahmad Shah Durrani's rise to power. It became a strong organized force after 1880 when Emir Abdur Rahman Khan established diplomatic relations with British India. In the 1980s it began receiving training and equipment from the former Soviet Union.

During the presidency of Hamid Karzai, several government agencies from the United States as well as Germany's Bundespolizei (BPOL) and the United Kingdom's Ministry of Defence Police began providing training. In 2007, the EU-led mission (EUPOL Afghanistan) was heading the civilian policing in Kabul while the United States began establishing training programs in all provinces of Afghanistan. The Afghan police have received basic training from U.S.-led NATO forces. After the fall of Kabul in August 2021, the Afghan police was reorganized and Taliban including members of the Islamic Emirate of Afghanistan's secret police were integrated into its ranks.

== History ==
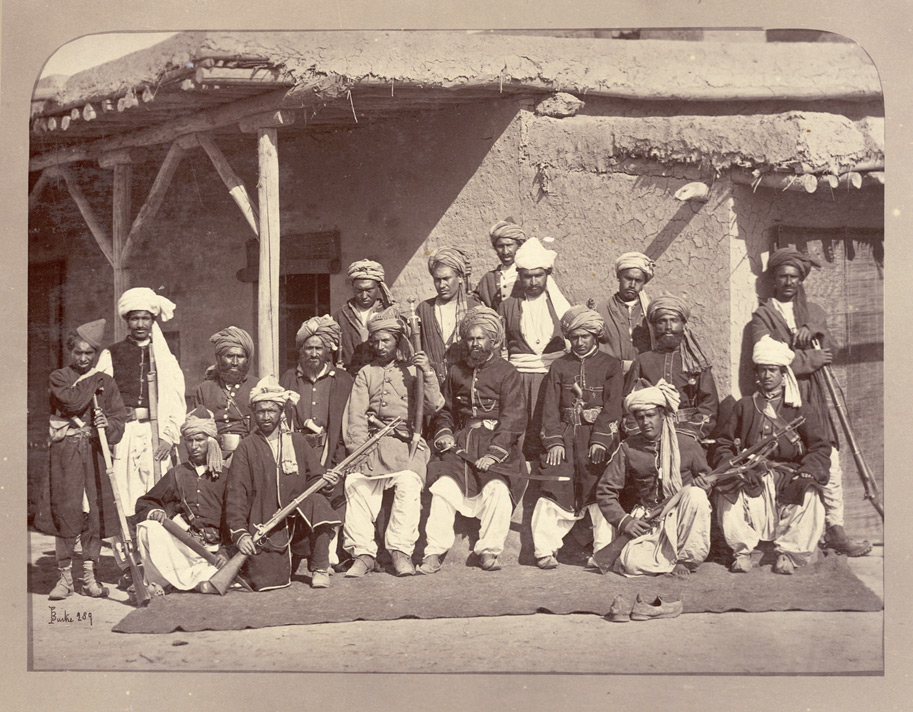
Members of the Afghan Local Police in c. 1879, who are historically known as members of the Arbaki.

The national police force of Afghanistan has its origins in the Hotak and Durrani empires in the early 18th century, which had jurisdiction over parts of neighboring countries until the 1893 Durand Line was established between Mortimer Durand of British India and Abdur Rahman Khan of Afghanistan.

In the 1950s, a group of army officers were reassigned to the police forces to develop a new cadre and modernize the police organization. And in the early 1960s, six of the top police students from the Kabul police academy were sent to Munich, Germany to get their master's degrees in criminology and police work. Among those were Abdul Latif Wared, Farouq Barakzai, Farouq Yaqobi, Assadullah Ahmadzai, Sidique Wahidi, Saadullah Yusufi, and some others.

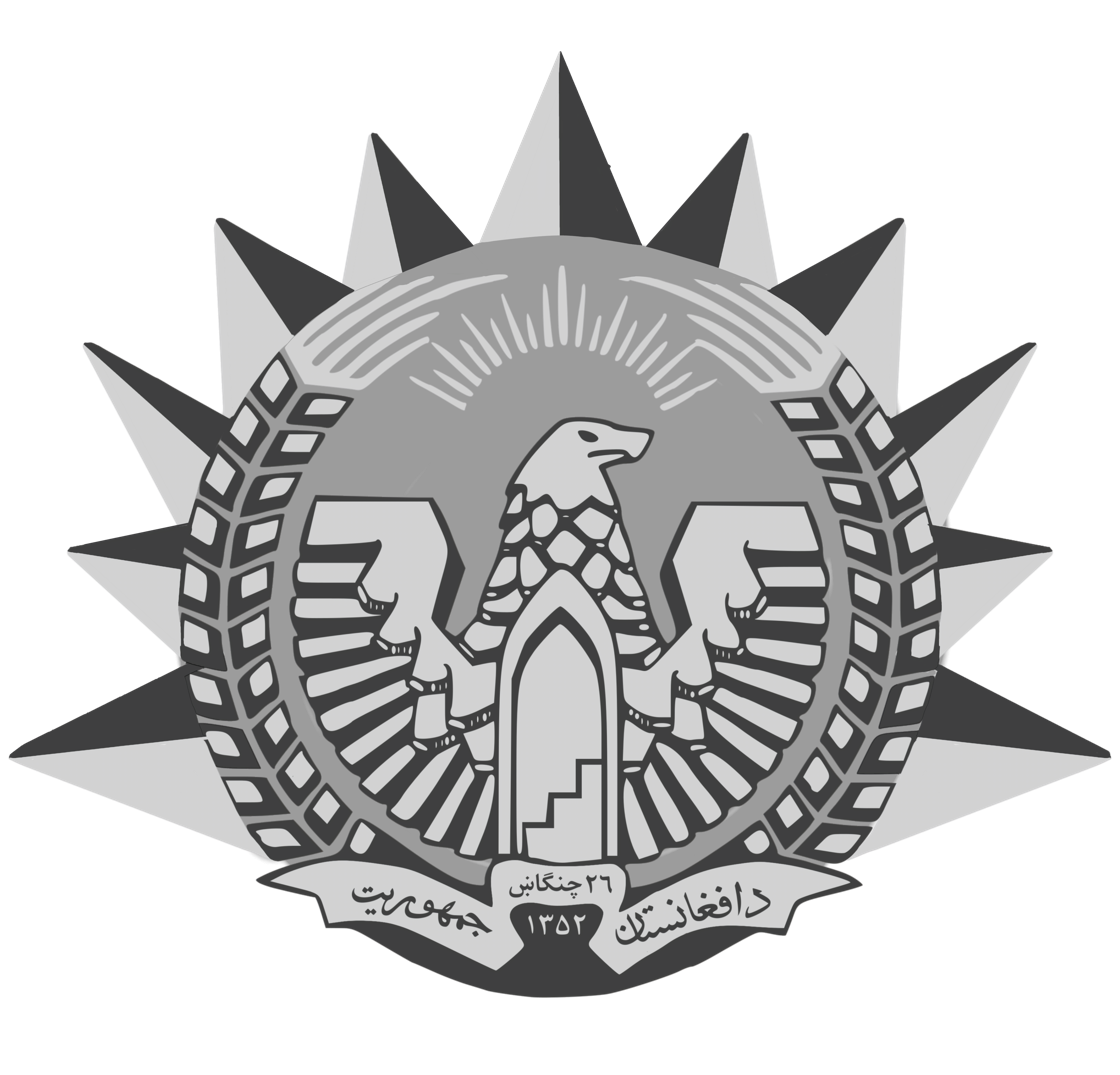
The emblem of the Afghan police force under the Republic of Afghanistan from 1974–1978

The Afghan police force remained strong throughout the Soviet occupation of the 1980s, with West Germany building a police academy in Kabul in 1989. The police force began disintegrating during the Battle of Kabul which lasted from 1992 to 1996, with the German-built academy also shutting down. The country at that point descended into civil war and then came under the heel of the Taliban government.

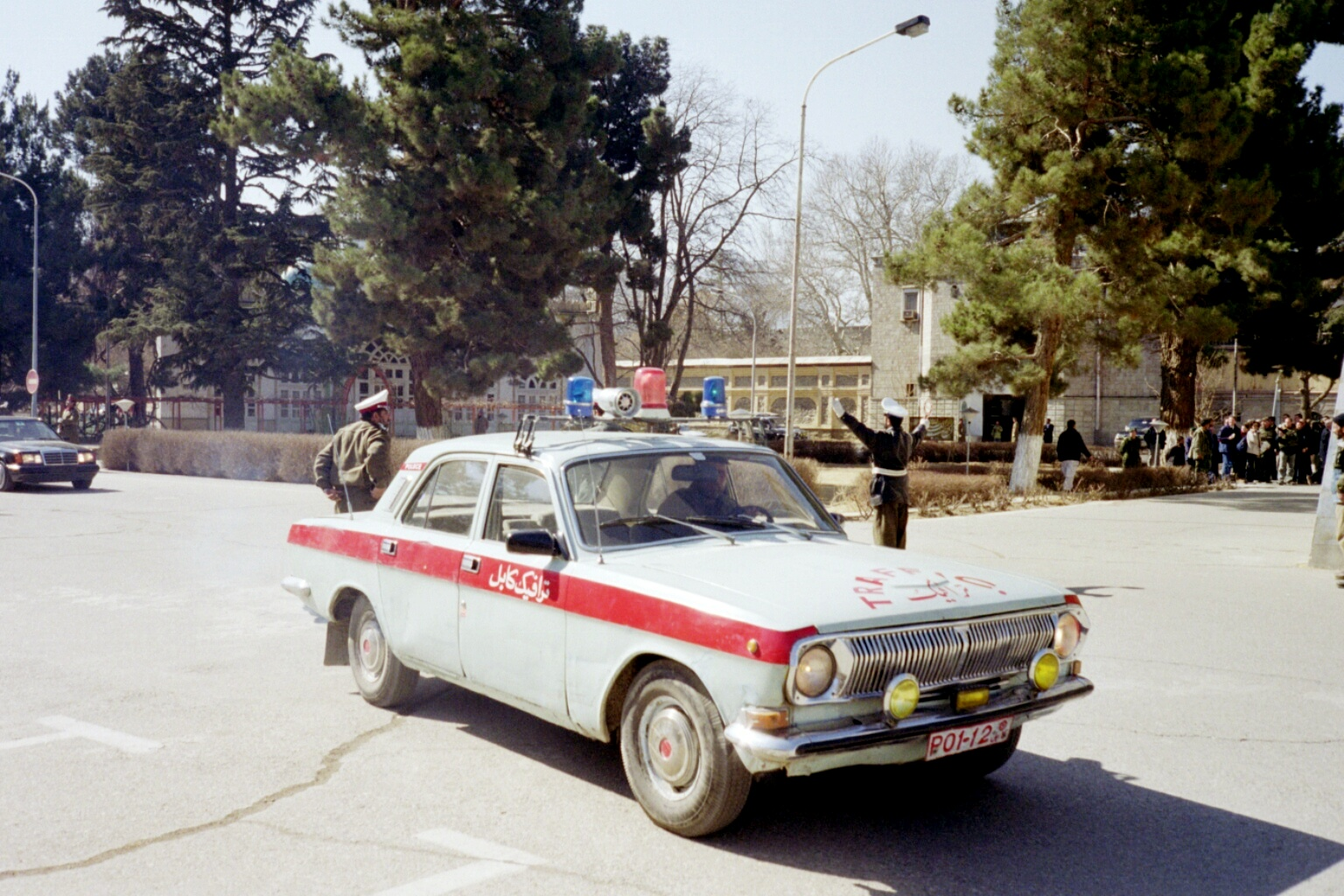
An old Soviet GAZ-24 (Volga) vehicle from the Kabul traffic police, 2002

After the collapse of the Taliban government in late 2001, there was little in the nation resembling a functional police department as private armed militias of warlords quickly filled the vacuum left behind by a lack of central governance. The Ministry of Interior in Kabul, under the new Karzai government of the Islamic Republic of Afghanistan, exercised little control over provincial police structures and was unable to effectively secure the remote provinces. Most of these problems had originally started after the Soviet-backed government of Mohammad Najibullah fell apart in 1992 and the country entered into a civil war. From 1978 to 1992 the Afghan police had firm control over the country, much thanks to the Soviet Union and other factors related to the Democratic Republic of Afghanistan or the Soviet war in the country. Traditionally, police officers were poorly paid, recruited or conscripted from the poorest classes of society and frequently held in contempt by the communities they served. Compounding these factors, over two decades of unrest had also resulted in an illiteracy rate conservatively estimated at over 70% for police recruits.

=== NATO training programs ===
Although early efforts had trained 35,000 officers in basic recruit schools during 2003 and 2004, this training was insufficient to strengthen the structures and senior command levels needed to create an effective police force. Germany, as lead nation for police under the Bonn II Agreement, concentrated its efforts on setting up the Kabul Police Academy and drafted the long range blueprint for restructuring the police services. Except for Kunduz Province which had a Provincial Reconstruction Team (PRT), Germany's program had only limited reach into the provinces. As the US Department of State International Narcotics and Law Enforcement Affairs Bureau's (INL) activity at this time was limited in resources and scope, the US Departments of Defense and State, in 2005, decided to shift the implementation of the police training and equipment program to the Office of Security Cooperation-Afghanistan (OSC-A), under the authority of the Commanding General, Combined Forces Command (CFC-A). In 2006, OSC-A became the Combined Security Transition Command – Afghanistan (CSTC-A) keeping the OSC-A mission.

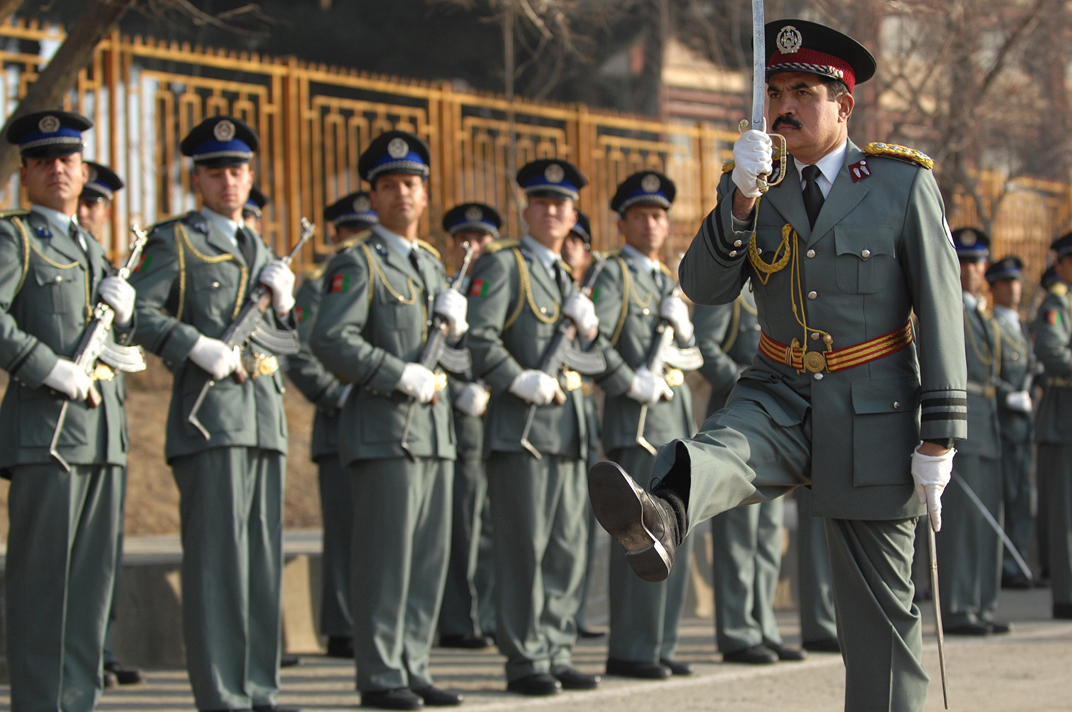
ANP commander marching to greet distinguished visitors at the Afghan National Police Academy (ANPA) in 2010.

The 2005 changes led to an increased impetus to implement significant reform programs, particularly the reform of higher staff levels at the Ministry of the Interior, the placement of police mentors throughout the country, substantial pay increases in the police salary plan and an impending, complete restructuring of the police payroll system. A nationwide reassessment of infrastructure and equipment needs was also undertaken, followed with the distribution of critically needed weapons, ammunition, vehicles, and office/dorm furniture. Although progress has been made in the areas of infrastructure, equipment and payroll distribution, these programs would take some time to reach fruition.

Headquarters of the ANP in Panjwayi, Kandahar Province.

In the late 2000s the number of ANP officers getting killed in the line of duty jumped very sharply, with over 1,600 officers being killed in the years 2008 and 2009. By 2012, Afghan officials estimated that about 200 police officers are killed in the line of duty each month.

In the meantime, ANP members have been accused of massacres and corruption. In 2012, one ANP from Paktia and two from Logar were arrested for kidnapping children. The police confessed to the crime, while one of the kidnapped boys said, "I received a phone call from the policemen who introduced themselves as my friends. They offered me a ride. I went unconscious after they dragged me into a car." In January 2013, a police commander in Uruzgan Province was accused of killing 121 local people. He fled to Ghazni Province and authorities said they will soon arrest the fugitive.

In early 2012, the Ministry of Interior provided 300 armoured vehicles to the 1st border police brigade stationed around the porous Durand Line, in Nangarhar province. Col. Mohammad Ayub Hussainkhel, the 3rd Border Police Brigade Commander, said "the border police are now capable of maintaining better security for the Durand Line and to prevent infiltration of militants into the province from Pakistan." In February 2012, the United States promised that it would support the government of Afghanistan to protect its sovereignty and effectively control its borders. At a 2012 meeting with Danish Prime Minister Helle Thorning-Schmidt in Chicago, US President Barack Obama said, "We are going to be consulting with not only Denmark but our other allies in making sure that is a smooth transition and one that is sustained, where we continue to help the Afghan government support its own sovereignty and effectively control its borders." In April 2013, the Ministry of Interior announced a strategy to strengthen and make the ANP professional with support from the international community. It is a ten-year plan designed to make the ANP become more closer to a Western standards police force.

=== General Directorate of Intelligence ===
Following the fall of Kabul in August 2021, the Taliban under the Islamic Emirate of Afghanistan established the secret police and security surveillance agency known as the General Directorate of Intelligence (GDI). The ANP has undergone a reorganization after the de facto reassertion of Taliban military control over Afghanistan.

The Afghan National Police under the Taliban have additionally reformed its special units subordinate to the General Command of Police Special Units (GCPSU), under the direct control of the Ministry of Interior Affairs. There are two known formations with one based in Herat, the 555th Operational Unit, with another being the 333rd Special Forces or “National Unit”.

== Structure ==
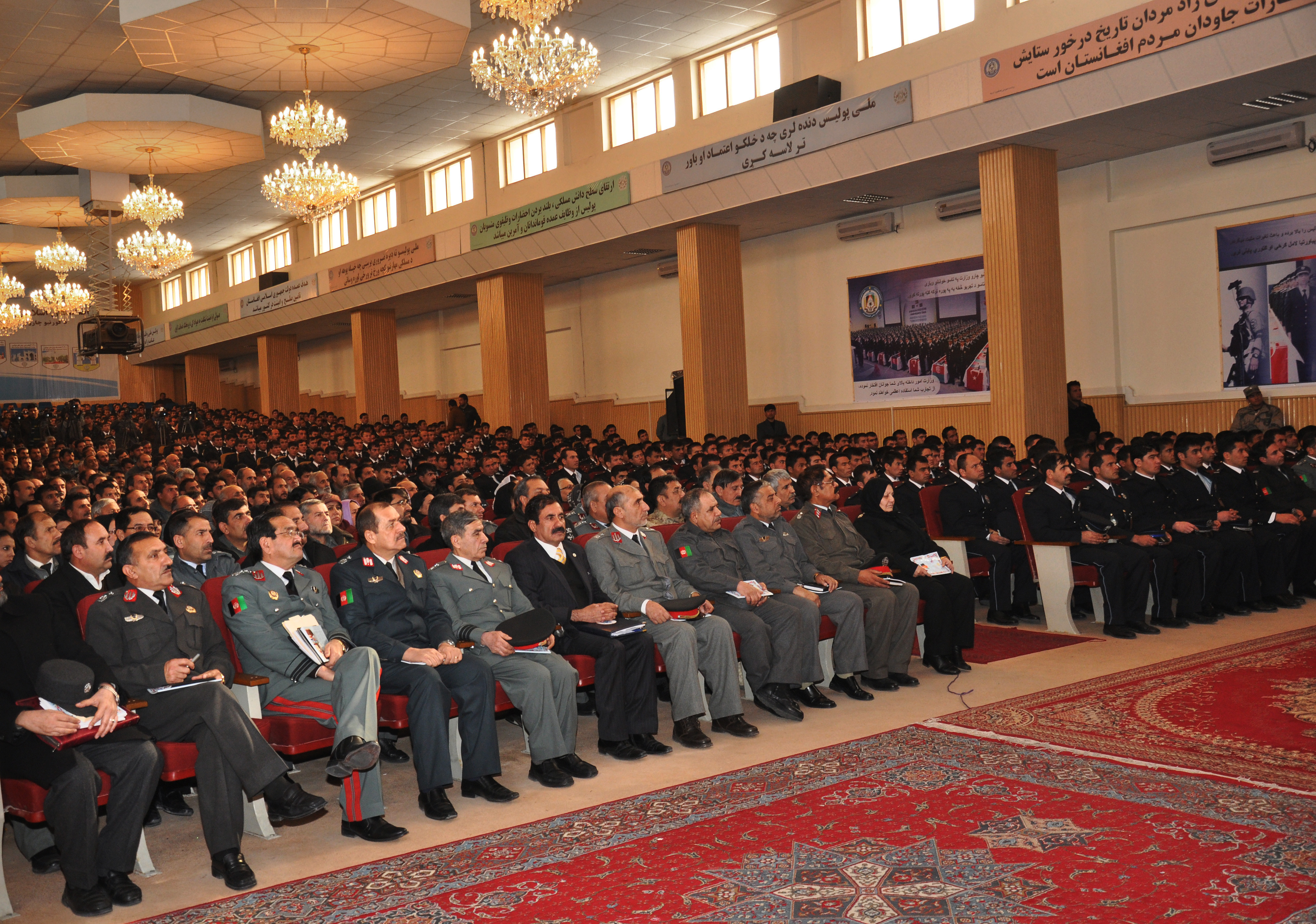
Graduation day at the Ministry of the Interior in 2012

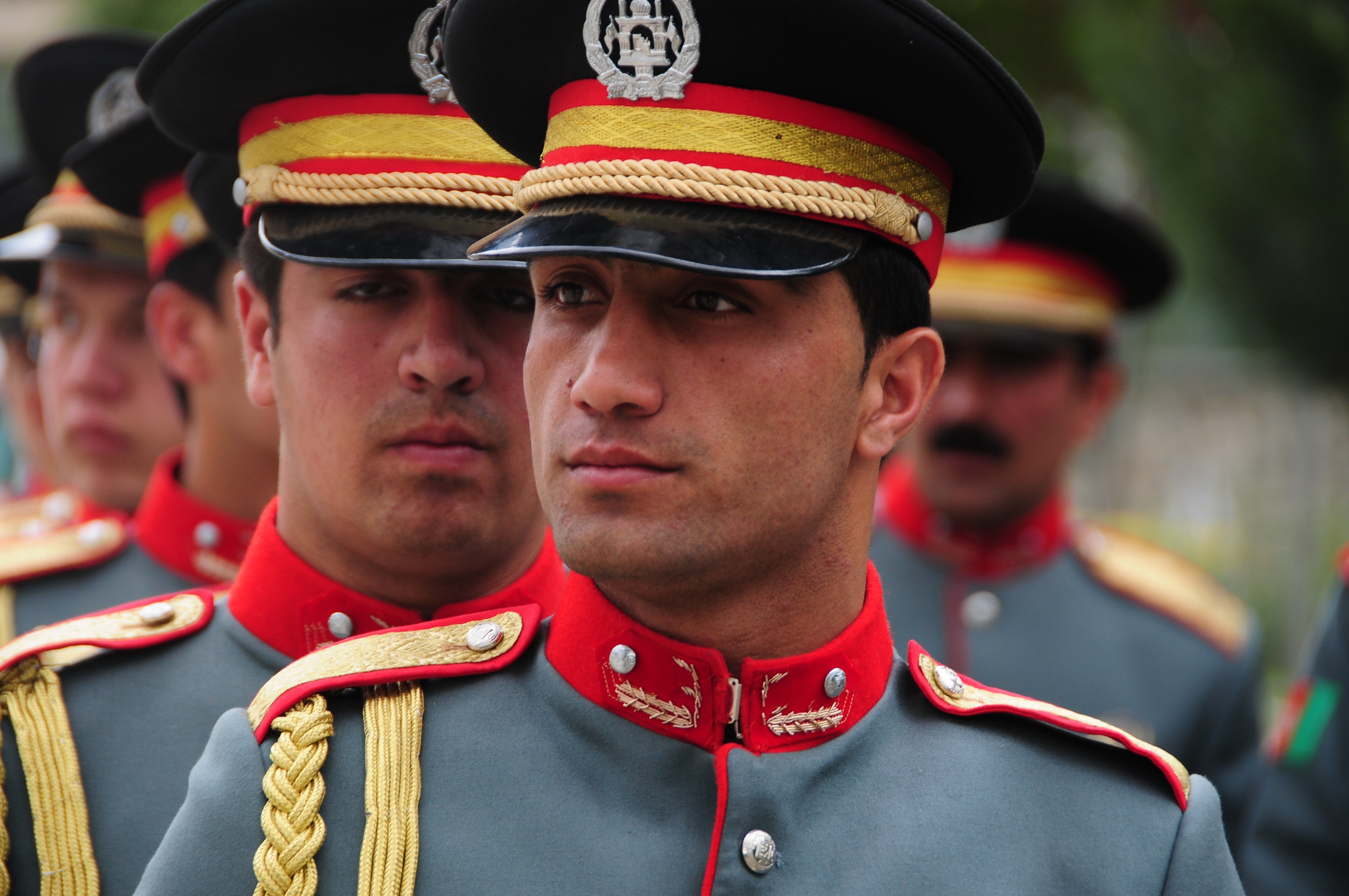
An Afghan National Civil Order Police (ANCOP) honor guard stands in formation at the Ministry of the Interior in 2010.

The Afghan National Police (ANP) is an organization that falls under the control and responsibility of the Afghan Ministry of Interior, along with the Counter-Narcotics Police of Afghanistan (CNPA) and the Counter Terrorism Department. The ANP is composed of the following sub-agencies:

1. Afghan Uniform Police
2. Public Security Police
3. Afghan Highway Police
4. Afghan Border Police
5. Criminal Investigation Department
6. Afghan Local Police (ALP) Now part of ANP

=== Uniform police ===
The Afghan Uniform Police (AUP) is the primary civil law enforcement agency in Afghanistan. The ANP is divided into five regional commands (north, south, east, west and central). Other forces falling under the command and control of the ANP include local traffic police departments as well as the fire department.

=== Public Security Police ===
The Public Security Police (PSP) was a gendarmerie responsible for civil order and counterinsurgency. The PSP was formed in March 2018 from part of the ANP Afghan National Civil Order Police (ANCOP) with the majority of the ANCOP transferring to the Afghan National Army to form the Afghan National Civil Order Force (ANCOF).

=== Highway police ===
The Afghan Highway Police (AHP) was a sub-department of the national police that is currently dissolved with only speculation of return. Their primary responsibility was to provide traffic safety and overall security of the "Ring Road" highway that connects most of the major population centers in Afghanistan. Most of the personnel, equipment and facilities that comprise the highway police were reorganized under the uniform police.

=== Border police ===
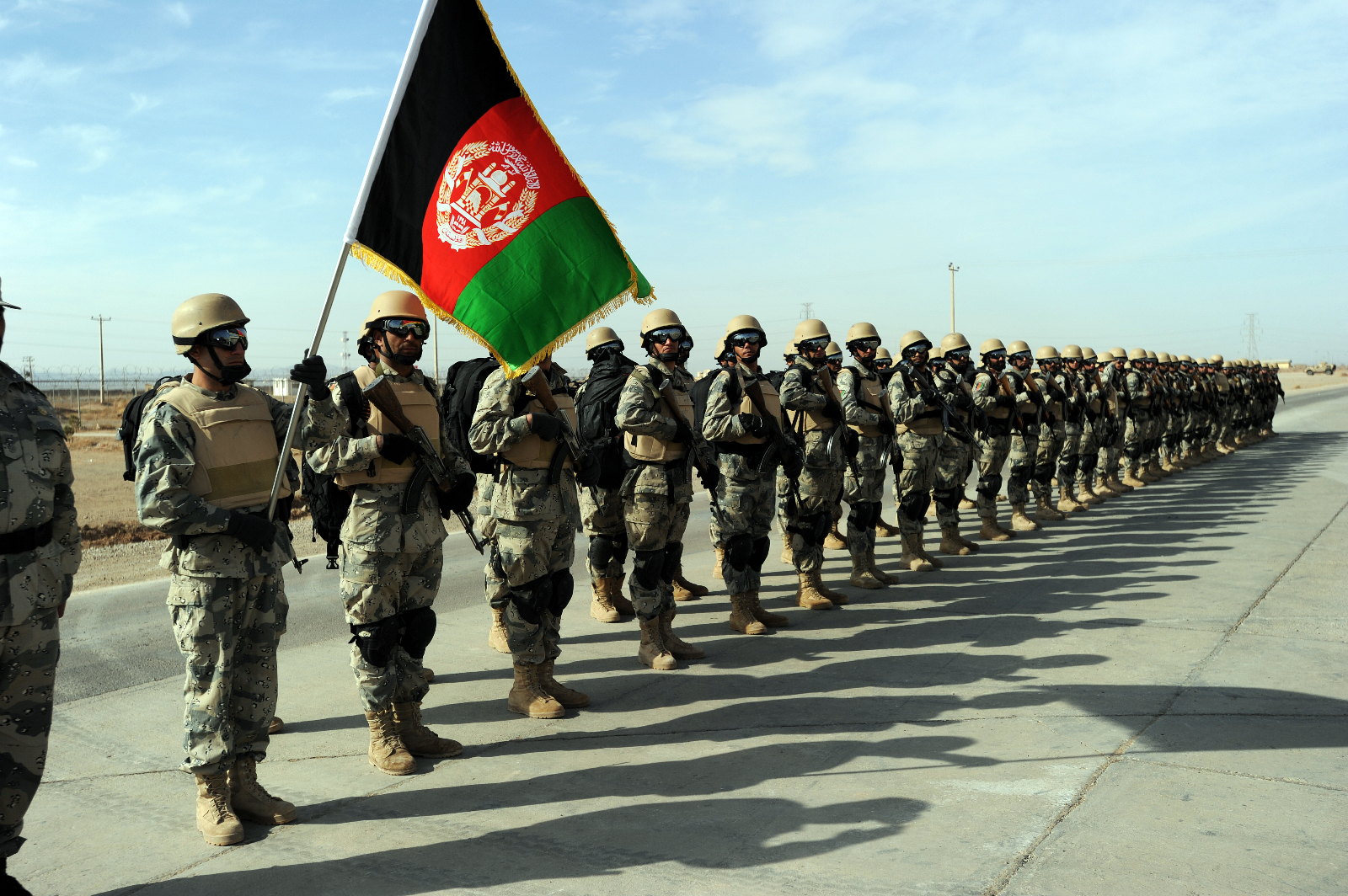
Afghan Border Police (ABP) at Islam Qala in western Herat Province.

The Afghan Border Police (ABP) were responsible for securing all the borders with neighboring countries and international airports of Afghanistan against the illegal entry of persons as well as the smuggling of contraband. The ABP is divided into six regional zones, with headquarters in Mazar-i-Sharif, Fayzabad, Jalalabad, Gardez, Kandahar, and Herat. As of January 2011, there were at least 25 U.S. Immigration and Customs Enforcement and Customs and Border Protection officers providing training to the Afghan Border Police. Homeland Security Secretary Janet Napolitano stated that the number could reach 65 or more by the end of 2011. Napolitano visited the Torkham border crossing with Pakistan and was satisfied with the progress being made there. The ABP specific duties included the following:

- Provided border security patrols within a security zone that extends 55 km into the territory of Afghanistan.
- Provided immigration / visa services and investigate immigration violations.
- Established and maintained border crossing points, to include all international airports within the country.
- Provided perimeter, building, aircraft and passenger security of international airports.
- Arrested and deported illegal persons.

=== Criminal Investigation Department ===
The Criminal Investigation Department (CID) is staffed with 4,148 investigators spread over the nation with the majority in Kabul. They are tasked with investigation, crime scene forensic procedures, documentation of crime, and assisting other agencies to include assistance through the crime lab housed at the Ministry of Interior Affairs.

=== Police Districts ===
There are a number of police districts throughout Afghanistan for example Police District 9 covers about 24 km^{2} of Eastern Kabul.

== Training facilities and district headquarters ==
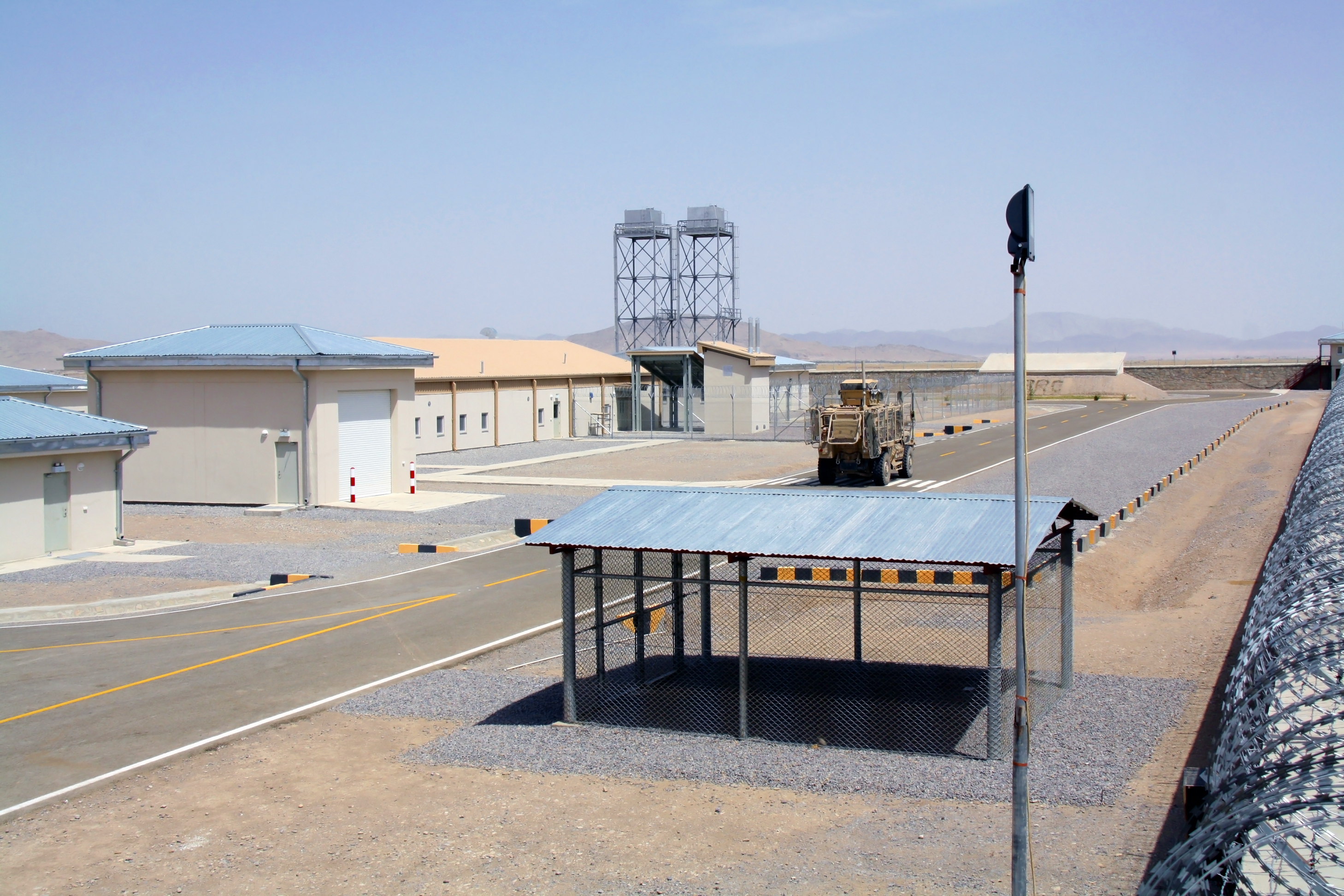
Inside the Afghan National Civil Order Police (ANCOP) garrison in Kandahar Province

The United States Army Corps of Engineers built nearly 200 modern police stations for the Afghan National Police. The total cost of the project was reported to be over $600 million US dollars, and each police station is said to cost about $6 million.

The main ANP training facility in Kabul was established by the German police mission and was subsequently led by the United States.

Regional ANP training facilities have been established in:

- Wardak (led by ISAF)
- Gardez (led by USA)
- Kandahar (led by USA)
- Herat (led by Italy)
- Mazar-e-Sharif (initially led by Germany), handed over to Afghan Control on 1 April 2012
- Khost (led by USA)

== Rank structure ==
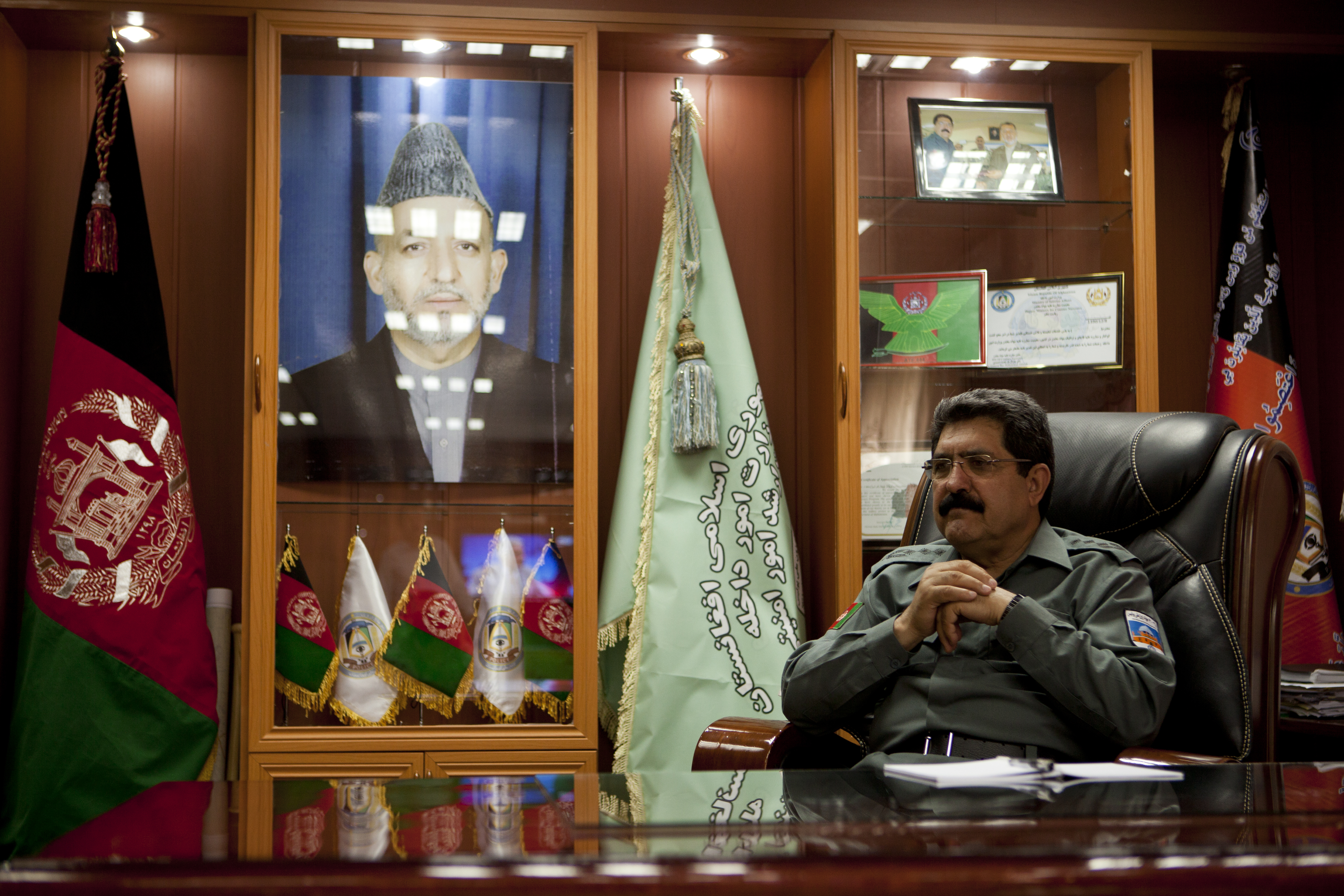
Col. Abdul Eliam, Chief of Police of Helmand province.

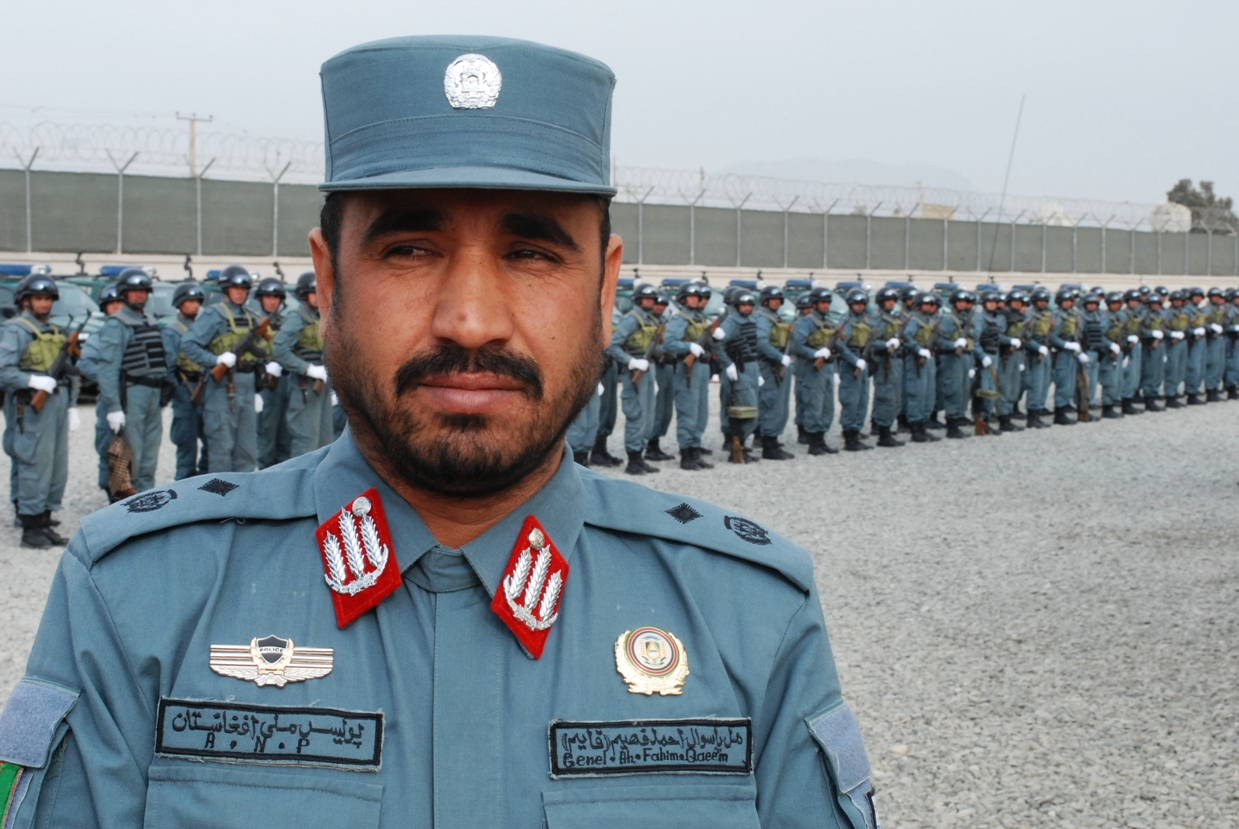
Brig. Gen. Ahmed Fahim Qayem, commander of the Central Unit, Police Zone 101.

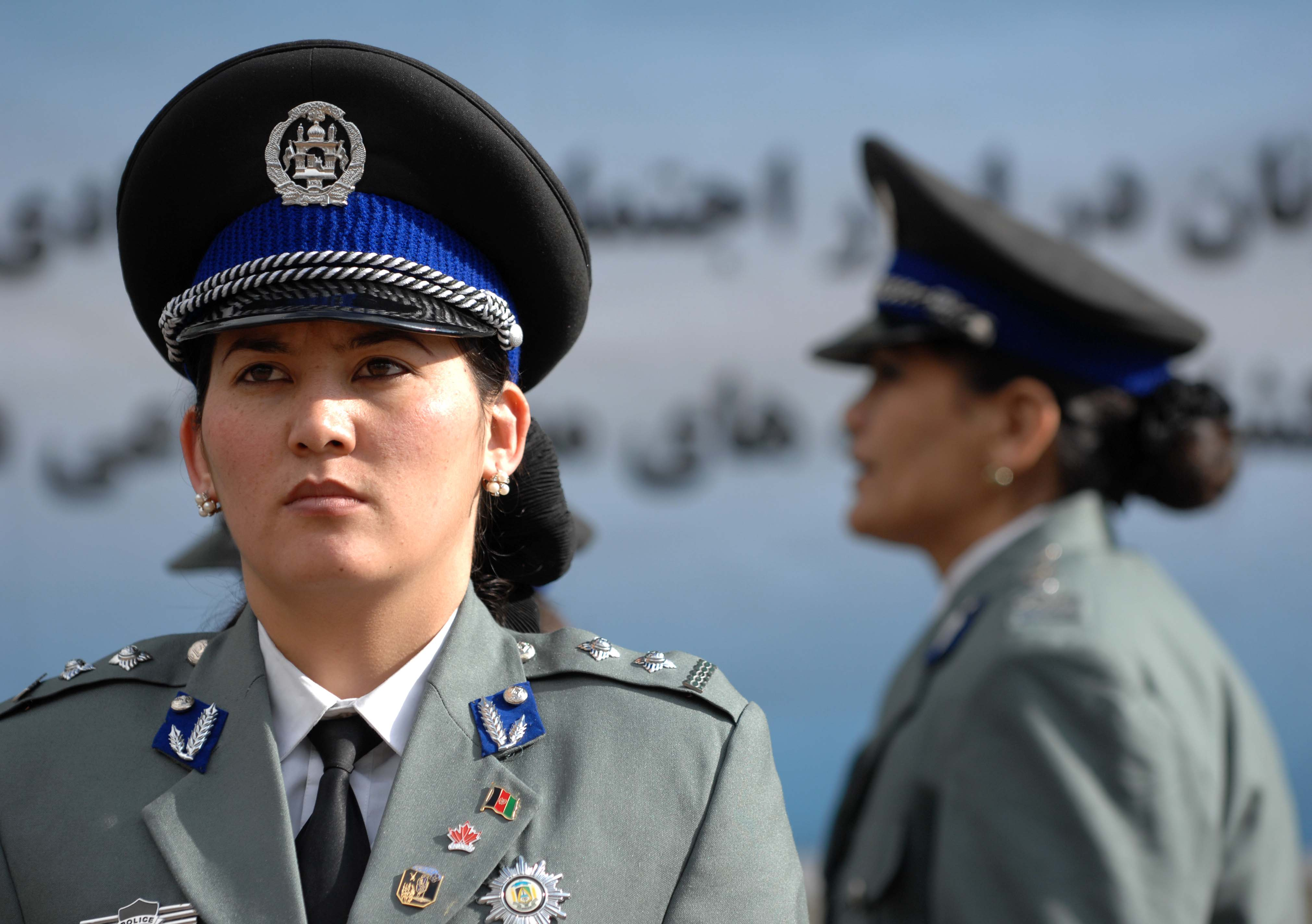
Female ANP officers stands at attention during a pass and review formation before the start of the International Women's Day ceremony at the Ministry of Interior in Kabul on March 4, 2010.

=== General officers ===
- Lieutenant General
- Major General
- Brigadier

=== Officers ===
- Colonel
- Lieutenant Colonel
- Major
- Captain
- First Lieutenant
- Second Lieutenant

=== Non-commissioned and enlisted ===
- Sergeant
- Patrolman

=== Rank disparities ===
Some ranks are known by several names. These disparities are most-likely caused through different translations from Dari to western languages as well as being interpreted differently by inherently unrelated agencies such as the U.S. military versus the German Police. The role of the "sergeant", or non-commissioned officer, is not well developed and is often overlooked by the prestige associated with being a regular, or commissioned, officer (lieutenant or higher). This lack of emphasis on the subordinate ranks has also stunted the clear definition of ranks as well as their roles and responsibilities.

The Ministry of Interior is phasing out the ranks of 3rd Lieutenant and Senior Captain as part of a rank reform that affected many high-ranking officers. These ranks are believed to have helped distinguish and balance a top-heavy leadership.

=== Known alternative titles ===
2nd Patrolman	Soldier
1st Patrolman	Soldier
Sergeant	3rd Sergeant
Staff Sergeant	2nd Sergeant
Senior Sergeant	1st Sergeant

=== Rank reform ===
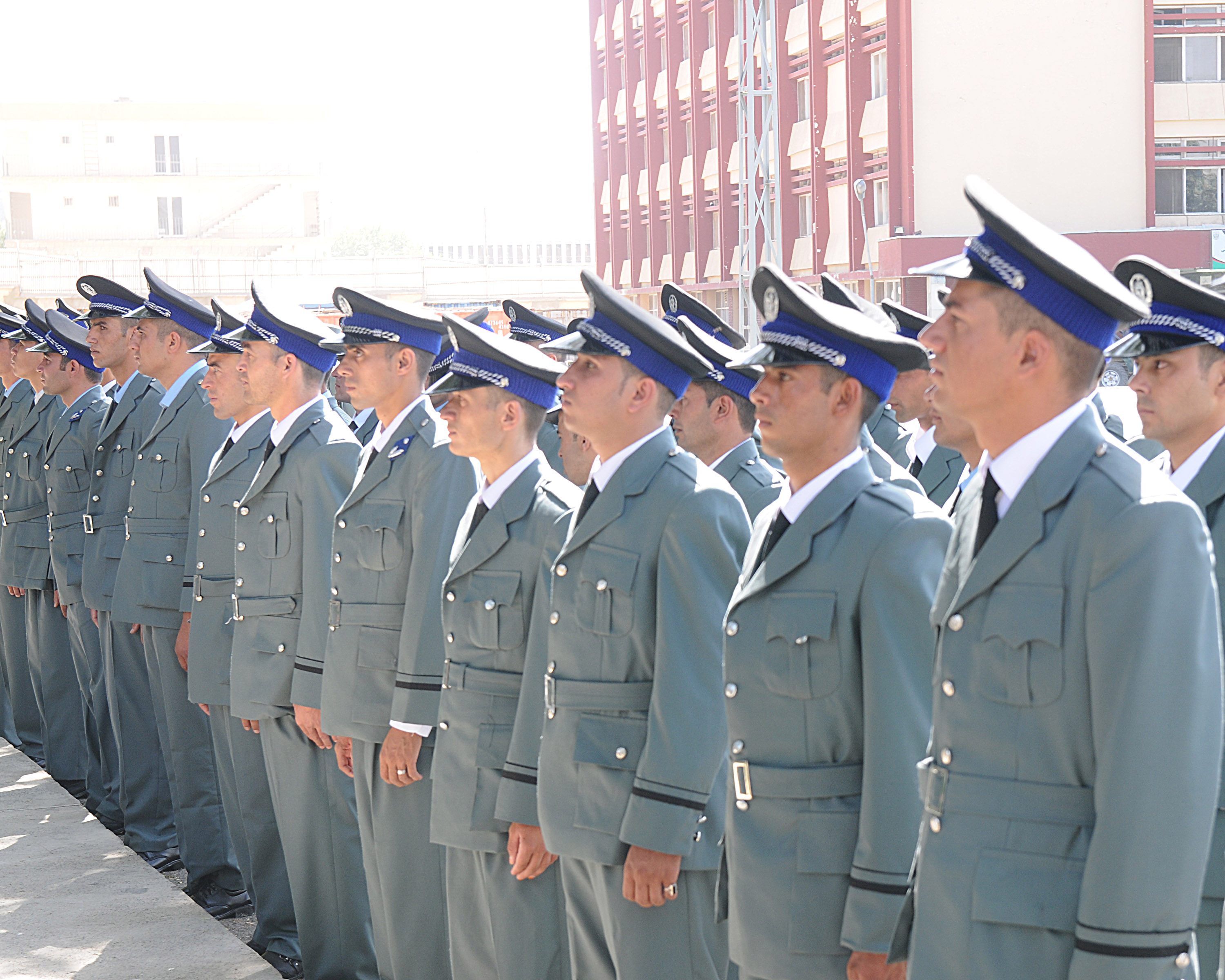
ANP cadets stand in ranks while they receive instruction before boarding buses headed for Kabul International Airport on their way to Turkey for a six-week advanced NCO training course.

The original formation of police and security forces saw an overwhelming majority of senior-ranking personnel due to disorganization and corruption. It was not uncommon to find someone holding a senior rank, such as lieutenant colonel, possessing minimal qualifications or having little to no responsibilities for a rank of that stature. It was a period of total mismanagement that allowed people to use bribery and other forms of influence to gain prominent positions in the national police force. It was soon evident that the organization was “top heavy” and thus ineffective in conducting the daily duties expected of the police. Furthermore, many leaders inside the Ministry of Interior were guilty of human rights violations and other forms of blackmail and corruption. There was an obvious need to reorganize and repair this broken ministry.

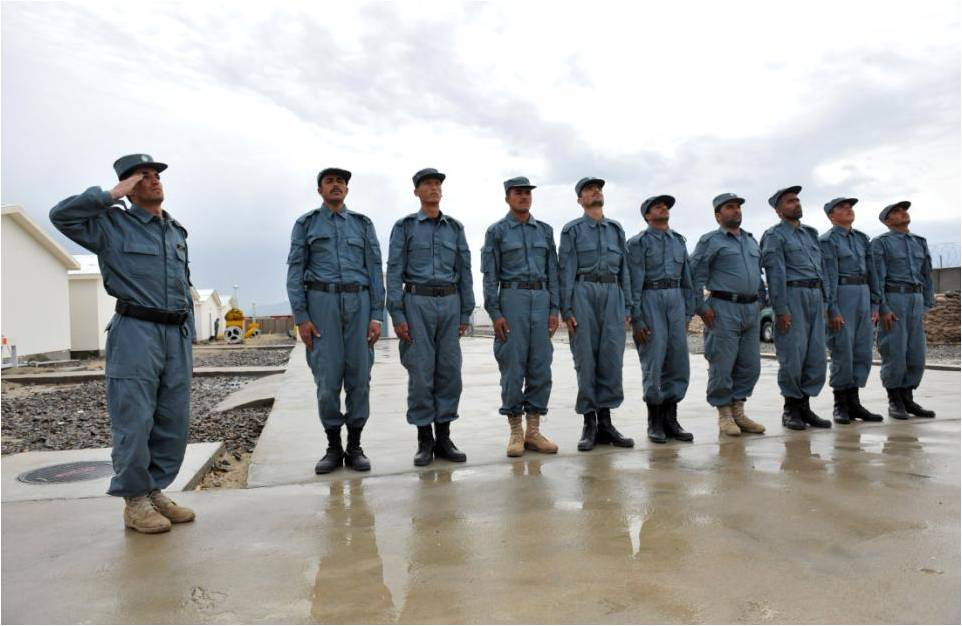
Afghan Police at Forward Operating Base Ghazni

MOI began a Rank Reform initiative in October 2005 to completely overhaul and replace its existing leadership structure and composition. The United Nations and ISAF forces conducted background checks on all eligible candidates in attempt to thwart the acceptance of MOI leaders with past human rights violations or records of corruption. Concurrent with rank reform, salary reform was also implemented to match their pay with that of their equivalent counterparts in the Afghan National Army who had been receiving higher pay from their inception.

Despite rank and pay reform, it is still very common to see a disproportionate level of senior-ranking officers within the police force. Although these officers have been "reformed" and their rank and pay adjusted to "sergeant", for example, they will still wear the rank of "captain", or whatever they feel is appropriate, in an effort to retain more authority. Corruption, bribery and treason are also still very common in the national police.

Widespread corruption in all levels of the ANP has long been a major problem for the combating of the Taliban insurgency. It was reported in 2008 that Taliban fighters of both high and low rank have been able to quickly buy their release from police custody with bribes ranging from $100–$10,000. Drug use, defections to the Taliban and sexual harassment of female officers within the ANP were also reported.

Due to the high level of corruption, the Afghan government began to send the relatively un-corrupted Afghan National Army to more sensitive scenarios. In January 2013, Hakim Shujayee, a Hazara police commander in Uruzgan Province was accused by higher authorities of killing 121 local people. He fled to Ghazni Province and the Minister of the Interior promised to bring him into custody very shortly.

It was reported in February 2010 that police in Afghanistan are largely illiterate, approximately 17 percent of them tested positive for illegal drugs, and they were widely accused of demanding bribes. Attempts to build a credible Afghan police force were faltering badly, according to NATO officials, making it difficult to build a capable national force.

It was reported in August 2022 the total number of the Afghan National Police was nearly 200,000. The same was reported in April 2023. It was announced in 2011 that the force would reach 160,000 by the end of 2014. In September 2013, it was reported at 157,000.

== Equipment ==
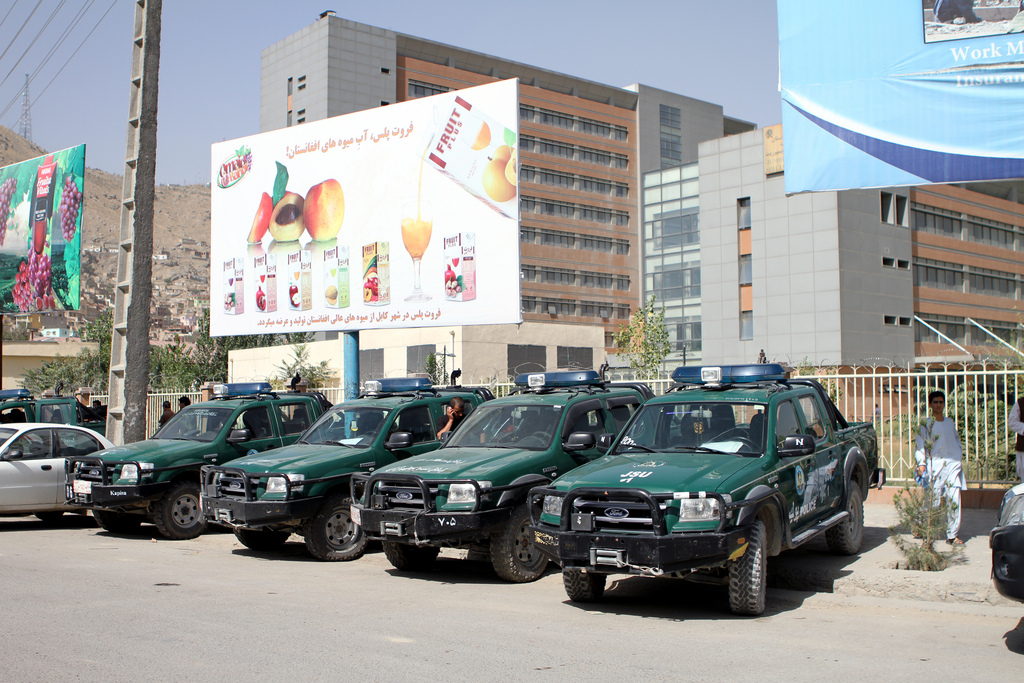
ANP Ford Rangers

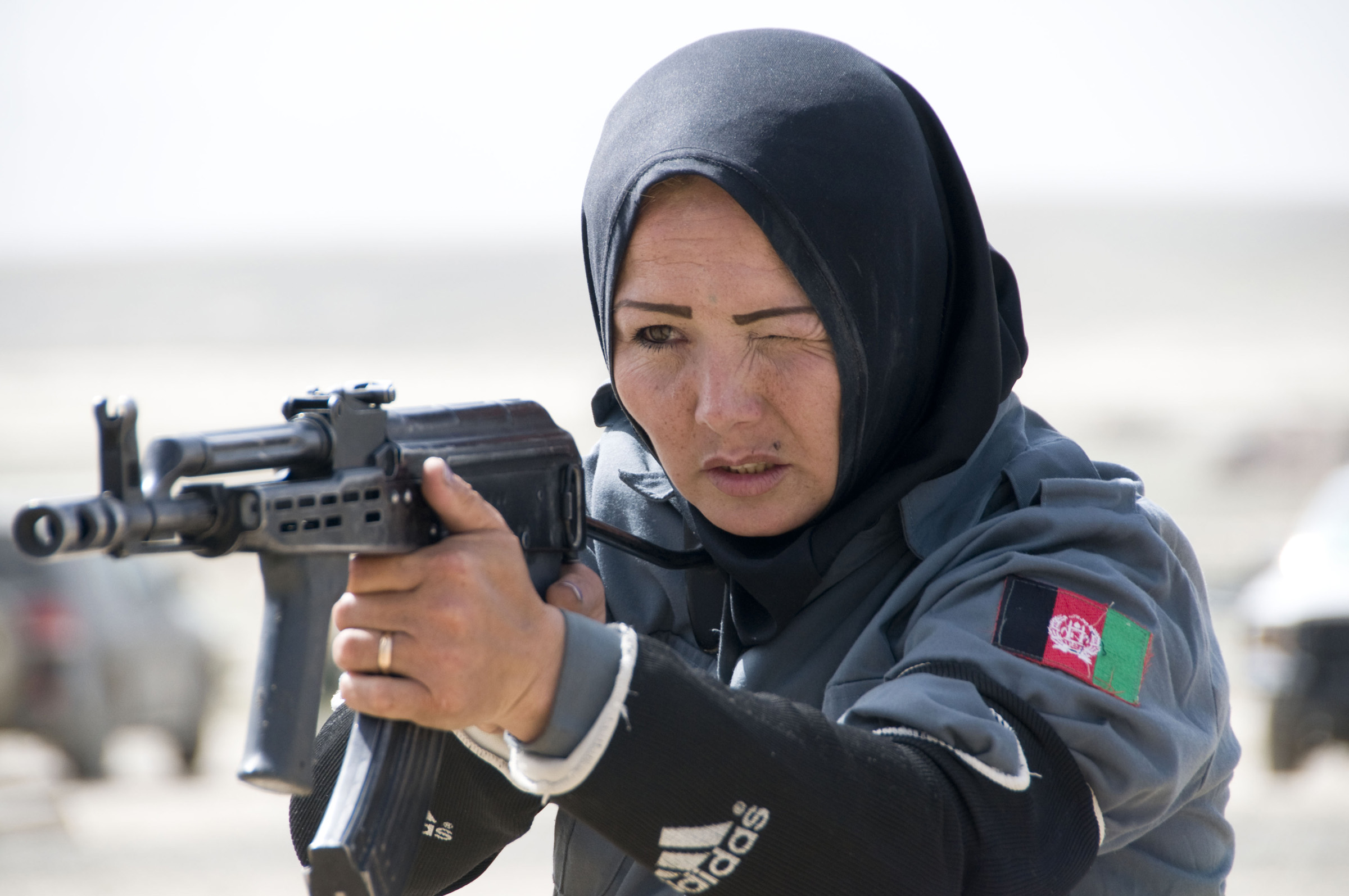
An Afghan National Police woman qualifies on the AMD-65 rifle during the tactical training program portion of the police basic training course at Kabul Military Training Center, 2010

The primary vehicle of the ANP is the four-wheel drive, diesel, 4-door Ford Ranger (and Ranger SORVs) with Federal Signal Vista lightbars, provided by the United States by the thousands. Other vehicles include Humvees, diesel-powered variants of the U.S. consumer Nissan Frontiers, Toyota Hilux pickup trucks imported from Thailand, and Volkswagen Transporter T4/Eurovans, as well as Yamaha motorcycles donated by Japan. Older vehicles, like the UAZ-469 all-terrain vehicle, were obtained from the Soviet Union.

=== Weapons ===
- Makarov PM 9x18mm pistol
- Smith & Wesson Sigma 9x19 pistol
- AMD 65 7.62mm assault rifle
- AKM 7.62mm assault rifle
- Vz. 58 7.62mm assault rifle (no longer in service)
- GP-25 40mm single-shot grenade launcher (attached to AKM)
- RPG-7 rocket-propelled grenade launcher
- Tokarev TX3 12 gauge shotgun

Uniforms and body armour are sometimes mismatched and poorly distributed. Most police personnel are issued at least one uniform that is traded out for warmer/cooler uniforms depending on the season. It is common to find a varying array of blue, green and gray uniforms amongst the police due to different manufacturers and the rapid growing of the force with many people joining. Some police have resorted to having their own uniforms custom made. Body armour and helmets are seldom given to individual soldiers and are often given out on an as-needed basis. The composition of this equipment varies between American, Russian and Chinese military grade equipment to 3rd party equipment that provides little-to-no real protection. Plans to upgrade weapons and uniform are being drafted by the Afghan government. Typically the ANP badge is worn on one shoulder and Afghanistan's flag on the other.

In August 2010, an order was placed for 2,526 M1152A1 Humvees with B2 armor kits, for the Afghan National Police and the Army.

== See also ==
- General Directorate of Intelligence (GDI) - Taliban's national intelligence and secret police agency of the Islamic Emirate of Afghanistan with its headquarters in Kabul
- Afghan Local Police (ALP)
- Afghan National Security Forces
- Ring of Steel (Kabul)
- Sarandoy
