= Alcohol in Afghanistan =

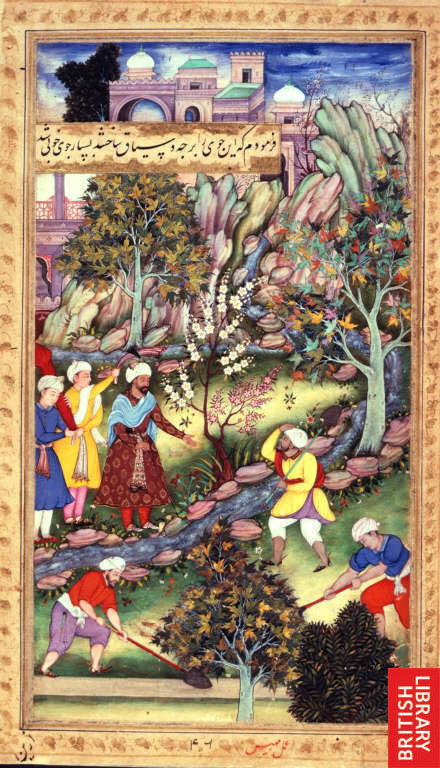
Babur having the course of the stream being altered at Istalif

The production and consumption of alcoholic beverages, especially wine, in Afghanistan has a long tradition – going back at least to the fourth century BC. Currently, the possession and consumption of alcohol is prohibited for Afghan nationals. However, the Afghan government provided a license for various many outlets to distribute alcoholic beverages to foreign journalists and tourists, and black market alcohol consumption is prevalent as well. Bringing two bottles or two litres of alcoholic beverages was allowed for foreigners entering Afghanistan prior to the Taliban takeover in August 2021.

== Overview ==
Afghanistan currently has about 60,000 hectares (150,000 acres) of areas cultivating grapes and excellent climate and terroir suitable for quality wine. While the history of wine goes back much longer, viticulture seems to have been well established in parts of Afghanistan by at least the fourth century BC. It is said that Babur, the first Mughal emperor, learned about wine in Kabul. His autobiographical memoirs, the Baburnama, is said to mention especially neighboring Istalif (the name possibly derived from Greek staphile, grape), "with vineyards and orchards on either side of its torrent, its waters cold and pure". The Mughal Empire received high quality wine from the Indus valley and Afghanistan. Medieval times saw a comparably flourishing wine production, which was ended in the 18th century. The 1960s saw trials to restart production, which was ended by the Taliban. Around 1969, a French survey estimated that (larger) vineyards covered about 37,500 hectare and 2% of the arable land. The largest part of vineyards was close to Herat, Kandahar and Kabul; smaller areas have been found on the northern border. The French survey has focused on the largest professional vineyards, but mentions grapes being grown in various gardens, even at 2,400 m altitude in Nuristan Province. A 1968 estimate related to a local aid program came to 60,000 hectares (150,000 acres) overall. By comparison, Austrian wine is grown in an area of about 51,000 hectares (130,000 acres). The main current production is around Kabul and goes – for religious reasons – mostly into juice and raisins.

== Locals ==
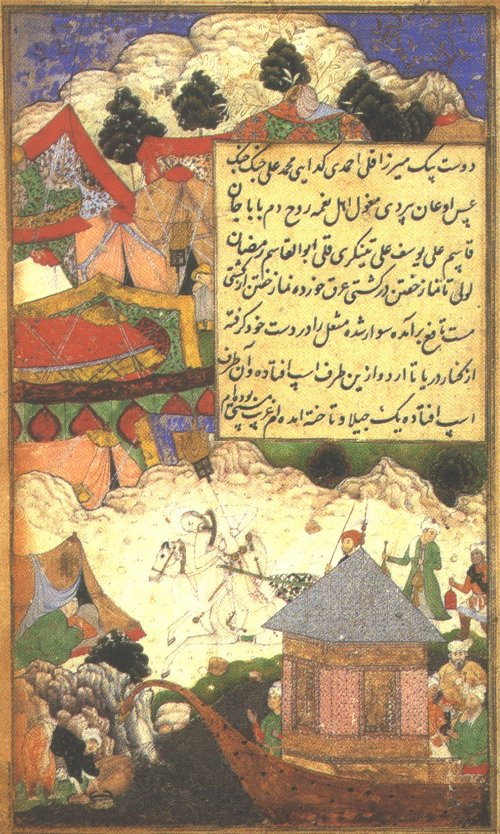
A Drunken Babur Returns to Camp at Night

Afghanistan is one of 16 countries in the world where the drinking of alcoholic beverages at any age is illegal for most of its citizens. Violation of the law by locals is subject to punishment in accordance with the Sharia law. Drinkers can be fined, imprisoned or prescribed 60 lashes with whip. According to the World Health Organization (WHO), alcohol consumption in Afghanistan is – officially – almost nonexistent. The total alcohol consumption in Afghanistan was approximately zero during 2003–05; during 2008–10, the recorded alcohol consumption was also zero but unrecorded consumption was estimated at 0.7 liters per capita. Enforcement of the law is inconsistent, and alcohol is widely available on the black market, especially in Kabul and in the western city of Herat, where good homemade wine is reported to be readily available at reasonable prices. In the northern part of the country, alcohol smuggling via Uzbekistan is a large business. Alcohol was more widely consumed in the northern city of Mazar-i-Sharif, including by the warlord Abdul Rashid Dostum.

Since the fall of the Taliban, various bars/outlets in Afghanistan had begun to offer alcohol to foreigners and tourists. Kabul has had an active and colorful nightlife, even compared to larger cities in other countries such as New Delhi, Karachi or Tehran. There was a large expatriate community of young and well-paid diplomats, security staff and international aid organizations. In 2010, some of outlets were searched and some Ukrainian waitresses were arrested as prostitutes. There have been several attacks on resorts and bars by Taliban militants.

== Tourists ==
Before the Taliban took over in August 2021, foreign tourists were permitted to import two bottles or two liters of alcoholic beverages when entering Afghanistan.

== Foreign military troops ==
Prior to September 2009, the International Security Assistance Force (ISAF) headquarters in Afghanistan had at least seven bars that served tax-free beer and wine, including a sport bar named Tora Bora. In 2009, after news of the death of 125 civilians in air strikes, General Stanley McChrystal, the head of ISAF, tried to contact troop officials. After finding that some troops were unable to adequately respond to the incident because they were drunk, he banned alcohol from the US premises. This applied as well to foreign soldiers.

Alcohol was also said to have played a role in the Kandahar massacre, a 2012 incident in which a United States Army Staff Sergeant (Robert Bales) murdered sixteen civilians and wounded six others in the Panjwayi District of Kandahar Province. The US military later banned alcohol for its troops. Despite the ban, US defense officials sometimes found alcohol at the bases.

Soldiers from other countries had been allowed to drink alcohol. Military bases of European troops usually had two liquor stores. German and French troops were allowed two small cans of beer per day in their main base. In smaller camps as in Camp Marmal, the rations were provided on a voucher base and were required to be opened at the spot to avoid the buildup of stocks. After some alcohol-related incidents in 2013, General Jörg Vollmer inspected premises personally to ensure the regulations being followed.

The end of the ISAF in 2015 greatly reduced the number of foreign troops. Compared to ISAF, the current [when?] Resolute Support Mission has only a tenth of the forces present in the country. Foreign tourists were allowed to bring two liters of alcohol in a duty-free bag when entering in Afghanistan. Drunk driving and the possession of larger amounts of alcohol were subject to jail terms of several months duration. Bundeswehr alcoholic beverages shipments were addressed as well to the enlarged (German) community and invited journalists.
