= Counter Narcotics Police of Afghanistan =

Specialist police force of Afghanistan

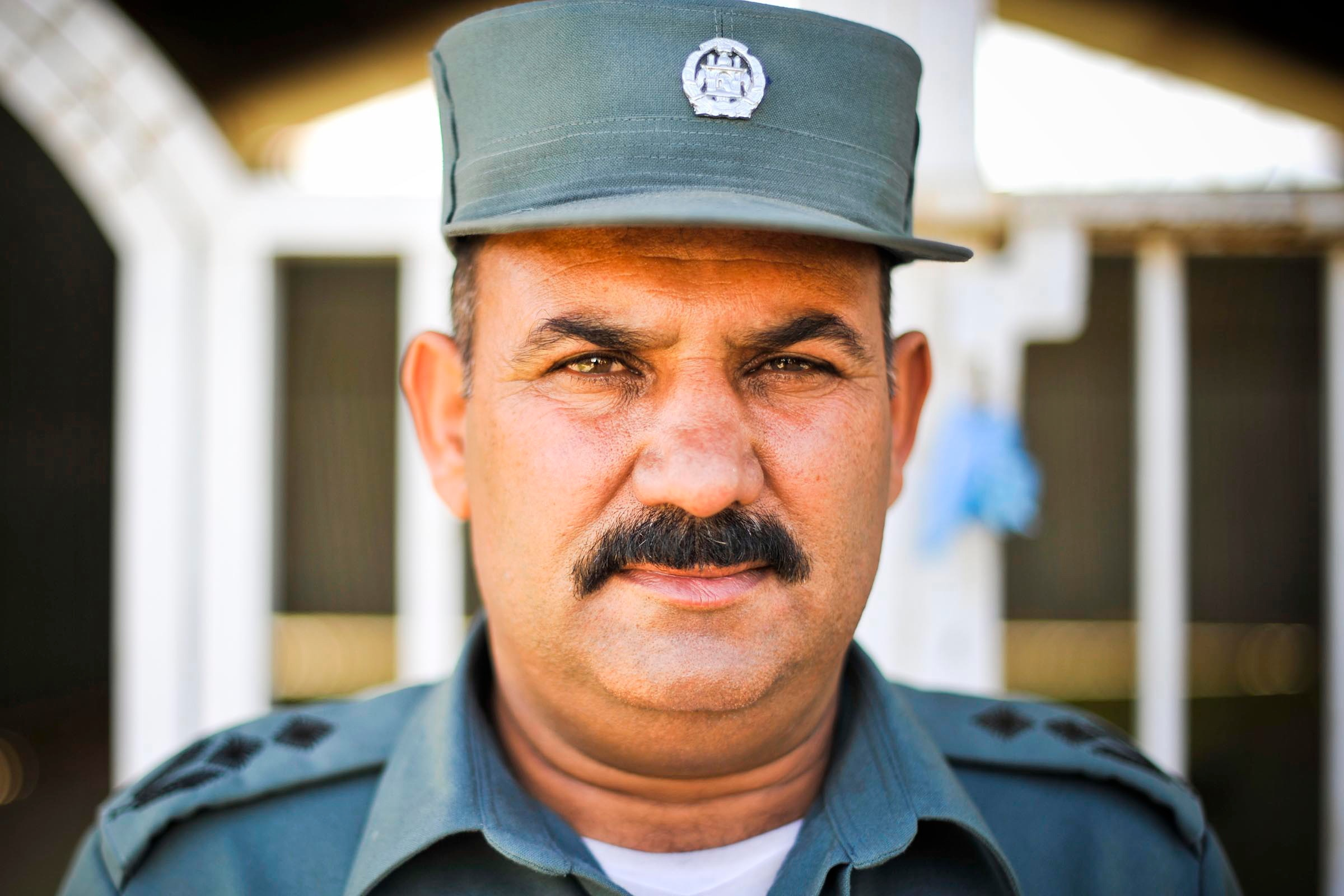
Lieutenant Colonel Abdul Qadir, Director of the Helmand Counter Narcotics Police.

The Counter Narcotics Police of Afghanistan (CNPA) was a specialist force under the command of the Afghan National Police to conduct investigations and operations in Afghanistan related to narcotics. The CNPA was assisted by American and British police officers with international special force units.

Candidates for the 5-week long Counter Narcotics Course must have completed an 8-week basic police course and are carefully selected.

== Structure ==
The CNPA was based in Kabul and is made up of six departments/directorates, which included various provincial and specialist units:

=== Command Structure ===
- CNPA Director General
  - Tactical Operations Center
  - CNPA HQ Intelligence Department
  - Specialized Unit Directorate
    - National Interdiction Unit
  - Provincial Directorate
  - Laboratory
  - Special Guard Force/Detention

=== Provincial Structure ===
- Interior Minister
  - Deputy Minister-Counternarcotics/Deputy Minister-Security
  - ANP Provincial Chiefs of Police (under DM-S)
  - CNPA Director General
  - CNPA Provincial Directorate
  - 34 Provincial Units
