= Afghan Public Protection Force =

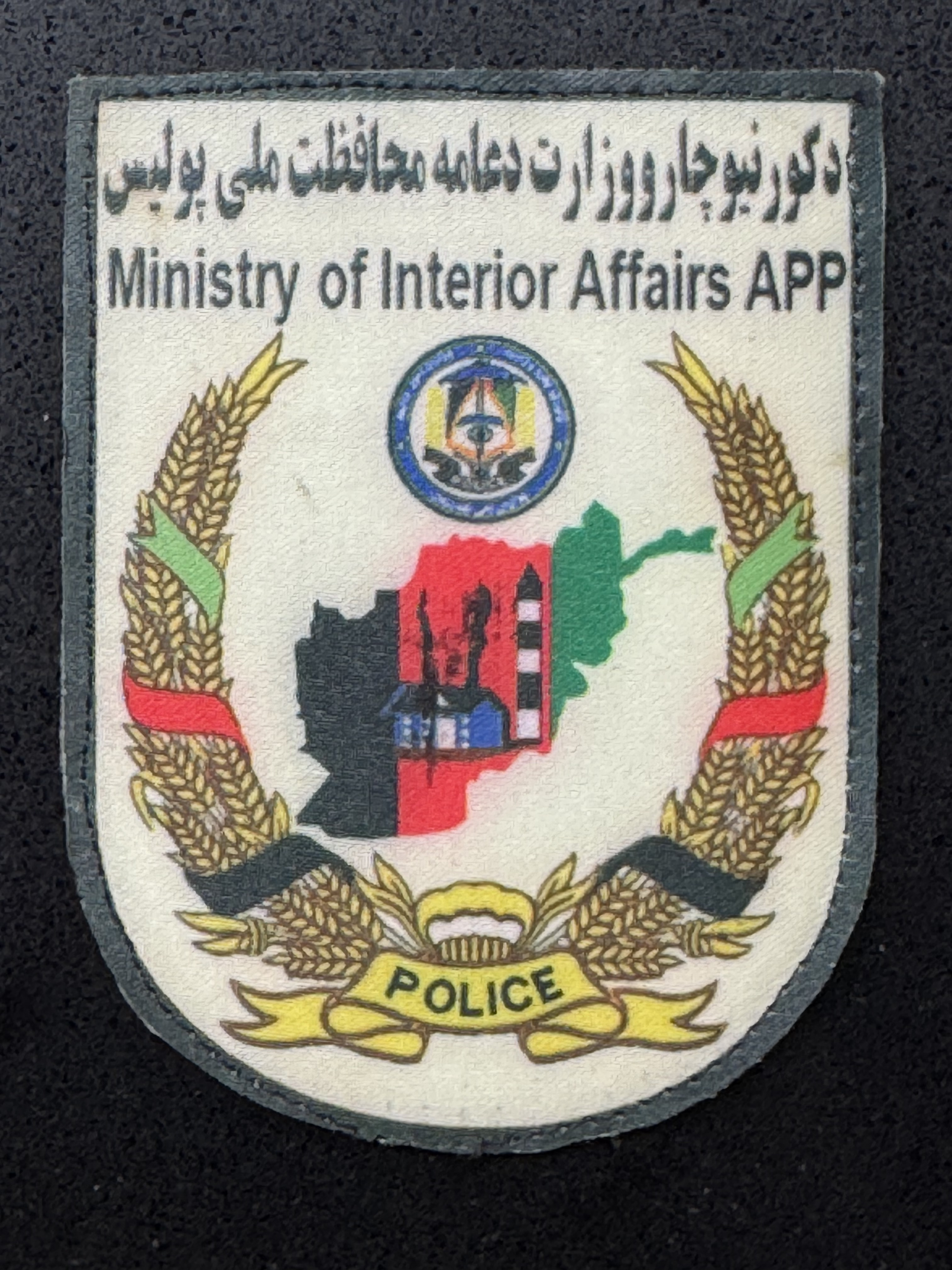
- APPF patch
- Active: 2009-14
- Country: Afghanistan
- Part of: Ministry of Interior
- Headquarters: Kabul, Afghanistan
- Website: www.appf.gov.af

Insignia
- Abbreviation: APPF

The Afghan Public Protection Force (APPF) was a Government of the Islamic Republic of Afghanistan (GIRoA) security service provider intended to protect people, infrastructure, facilities and construction projects.

The APPF is organized as a State Owned Enterprise (SOE) subordinate to the Ministry of the Interior and designed to contract with both domestic and international customers (examples include government aid organizations, nongovernmental organizations, private sector companies, ISAF, etc.) for security services within Afghanistan. Between 20 March 2012 and 20 March 2013, the APPF will replace all non-diplomatic Private Security Companies (PSCs) in Afghanistan as the sole provider of pay-for-service security requirements. APPF guards have no mandate to investigate crimes or arrest suspects.

== History ==
International Security Assistance Force (ISAF) affiliated sources report that the program was initially established in 2009 in order to allow Afghan Uniformed Police to focus more on traditional law enforcement tasks. APPF is now intended to serve as the government mechanism to address President Hamid Karzai's Presidential Decree 62 (PD62) dated 17 August 2010 (see,) that stipulates PSCs in Afghanistan will be disbanded. President Karzai, as reported by the media, has described PSCs as a parallel and unchecked power structure that undermines official efforts to stabilize the country. Media and open-source researchers highlight that PSCs have been criticized for corruption, diversion of Afghan security sector funding and prospective personnel, and are responsible for crimes against the people.

A bridging strategy for the implementation of PD62 was signed on 15 March 2011 by GIRoA Minister of Interior Bismillah Khan Mohammadi and President Karzai's Senior Advisor Ashraf Ghani that designates 20 March 2012 as the official date for existing PSC's full compliance with the PD62 directive. The bridging strategy does afford PSCs who are supporting ISAF bases, construction projects, and fixed-site security until no later than 20 March 2013 to comply. Diplomatic security contracts remain exempt based on the principles set forth in the Vienna Convention on Diplomatic Relations of 1961.

The APPF was reportedly disbanded in March 2014 with its personnel folded back to the MoI.

=== Transition ===
The APPF transition process is reported to include three primary objectives: transition of personnel from existing PSCs to the APPF, transition of existing contracts to APPF contracts, and the optional transition of existing private security companies to Risk Management Companies. Risk Management Companies (RMC) are defined in the bridging strategy as:

"Companies with Consultants that advise on the security of persons, logistics, transportation, goods and equipment, command and control of security employees from the APPF on the basis of professional norms derived from industry best practices and agreed with MoI [Ministry of Interior]. RMCs would not provide security services but would provide advisory services and command and control functions on behalf of development implementing partners and contract for security services with APPF for the development entity on behalf of the implementing partner."

Article 3 and 4 of PD62 provides PSCs with the option of either selling their weapons and equipment to GIRoA or having them shipped out of the country.

== Organization ==
The APPF official website states that “the APPF is headquartered in Kabul with eight regional zone headquarters located in Herat, Shamshad, Mazar-i-Sharif, Kunduz City, Kandahar, Gardez, Helmand City, and Jalalabad City. The APPF is led by Deputy Minister Jemal Sidiqi who also serves as chairman of the APPF SOE Executive Board. He has two deputies, Brigadier General Sardar Mohammed Sultani, Director of Operations, and Mr Noorkhan Haidari, Director of Business Operations.”

The APPF Advisory Group was formed by ISAF in September 2011 to work in partnership with the MoI to support the program's development and implementation. Successful implementation of the program will reportedly preserve up to $20 billion in ISAF, USAID, and international community development projects and will enable jobs for thousands of Afghan citizens.

=== Training ===
The APPF Training Center (ATC) was established in Kabul Province and is run by MoI certified Afghan National Police Trainers supported by personnel from the NATO Training Mission-Afghanistan and DynCorp. The APPF training program for basic guards is 3 weeks in length and is reported to include 74 learning objectives that range from self-defense and weapons training to basic police tactics and Islamic relations.

=== Requirements ===
According to an online source dedicated to news coverage of the war in Afghanistan, prospective APPF guards are vetted through the following means:

1. Valid Tazkera (Afghan identity card)
2. Two letters from village elders and/or guarantors
3. Personal information
4. Criminal records check
5. Drug screening
6. Medical screening
7. Biometric collection and enrollment in MoI's biometric system

APPF Guards who have been selected are afforded the following incentives:

1. Salary + Hazardous Duty & Incentive Pay
2. Free medical care
3. Pension eligibility
4. 20 days paid recreational leave per year
5. 20 days paid sick leave per year
6. 10 days paid urgent leave per year
7. Food stipend (or food provided by APPF client)
8. Martyrdom and burial payments for your family (equal to current benefits)
9. Current rank, status and level of expertise will be taken into account when transitioning to the APPF

== Concerns ==
Media sources citing existing PSCs, Aid organizations, and others have expressed concerns over the implementation timeline, readiness and competency of APPF guards, increased costs for customers, and the implications of many un-registered private security companies. U.S. reconstruction contractors have said that doing business with the APPF “could force contractors to violate U.S. contracting rules and thus become vulnerable to federal suspension and debarment.”

The Associated Press reports that the chairman of the United States House of Representatives Armed Services Committee, Representative Howard McKeon, will propose legislation that would “prohibit private contractors and Afghans from protecting U.S. installations.” The proposed bill stipulates that should the President refuse the mandate, “he must certify to Congress that private security contractors or the Afghan Public Protection Force can provide protection that is at least equal to that provided by the U.S. military.”

In a 20 March 2012 News Release from the APPF, the program reports that there have been 12 RMC licenses issued along with 18 security service contracts. In an article published by the Washington Post on 18 March 2012, it was stated that "the Afghan government is giving companies extensions ranging from a few weeks to 90 days to change from private security guards" to the APPF, the extension comes only three days before the previously indicated deadline of 21 March 2012. The Associated Press has reported that by 21 March 2012 11,000 Private Security Company Guards are expected to have transitioned to the Afghan Government APPF program.

== See also ==
- NATO Training Mission-Afghanistan
