= Aan (disambiguation) =

AAN or Aan or aan may refer to:

== Arts and media ==
- Aan, a 1952 Indian film
- Aan: Men at Work, a 2004 Indian film
- Ask a Ninja, a series of comedy videos

== Organizations ==
- Aaron's, Inc. stock ticker symbol AAN, a chain of rent-to-own stores
- Afghanistan Analysts Network, a research organization based in Afghanistan
- American Academy of Neurology, a medical specialty society
- American Academy of Nursing, a professional society
- American Action Network, a right-wing issue advocacy group
- Association of Alternative Newsweeklies, a North American trade association

== Other uses ==
- Aan River, a river in New Zealand
- Alexander Aan (born 1981), imprisoned atheist in Indonesia
- Anambé language of Brazil (ISO 639 code "aan")
- Al Ain International Airport in Abu Dhabi, United Arab Emirates (IATA airport code AAN)
- America's Auction Network, an American shopping channel
- Australian Approved Name, drug generic names approved by the TGA to be used in Australia
