= AN =

An, AN, aN, or an may refer to:

== Arts and media ==
- ANTV, an Indonesian television network
- Astronomische Nachrichten, or Astronomical Notes, an international astronomy journal
- Avisa Nordland, a Norwegian newspaper
- Sweet Bean (あん), a 2015 Japanese film also known as An
- Ân (album), by Edis

== Businesses and organizations ==
- Airlinair, a French regional airline, by IATA airline code
- Alleanza Nazionale, a former political party in Italy
- AnimeNEXT, an annual anime convention in New Jersey
- Anime North, a Canadian anime convention
- Ansett Australia, a defunct Australian airline group by IATA code
- Apalachicola Northern Railroad, a short-line railroad which operated in the Florida Panhandle of the US (reporting mark AN) 1903–2002
- AN Railway, a successor company to the Apalachicola Northern Railroad, 2002–present
- Aryan Nations, a North American neo-Nazi and Christian Identity organization
- AN, trademark for "Australian National", which was the trading name of the Australian National Railways Commission, a government-owned Australian rail operator from 1975 to 1987
- Antonov, a Ukrainian (formerly Soviet) aircraft manufacturing and services company, as a model prefix

== Language ==
- An, an indefinite article in the English language
- Aragonese language (ISO 639-1:2002 language code AN)
- an-, an English prefix meaning not, used before vowels
- Ân (digraph)

== Mathematics, science, and technology ==
- A_{n}, in mathematics, a root system and its Dynkin diagram
- A_{n}, in mathematics, conventional notation for the alternating group
- a_{n}, a generic label for a term of a sequence
- AN thread, Army and Navy thread - for bolts and tube fittings in 16th inch increments
- Acanthosis nigricans, a skin condition
- Acrylonitrile, an organic compound and monomer used in the manufacture of certain plastics
- Actinide (An), informal symbol for a series of chemical elements
- Ammonium nitrate (AN), a chemical compound
- Anode, in electronic schematics
- Anorexia nervosa, an eating disorder
- Application note (in engineering), most often seen as A.N.
- Attonewton (aN), an SI unit of force
- Anorthite, a feldspar mineral
- Adobe Animate, an Adobe animation software

== Military ==
- A prefix used by the U.S. military for electronic equipment named under the Joint Electronics Type Designation System
- A US Navy hull classification symbol: Net laying ship (AN)
- Avtomat Nikonova used for the AN-94

== Names ==
- Ahn (Korean name) (安)
- An (surname) (安), Chinese surname

== Places ==
- An County, in Sichuan, China
- Agios Nikolaos (disambiguation), a common place name in Greece and Cyprus
- Province of Ancona, a province of Italy (ISO 3166-2:IT code AN)
- Andaman and Nicobar Islands, a territory in southeastern India (ISO 3166 code AN)
- Anderson County, Kansas (state county code AN)
- Andorra (FIPS, LOC MARC and obsolete NATO country code AN)
- Angola (World Meteorological Organization country code AN)
- Netherlands Antilles (ISO country code AN)

== Religion ==
- An (Shintō), a small table or platform used during Shinto ceremonies
- Anu or An, a god in Sumerian and Babylonian mythology

== Other uses ==
- Associate degree in nursing
- Algebraic notation (chess) (AN), the standard system for recording moves in chess

== See also ==
- Aan (disambiguation)
- Ann (disambiguation)
