= 2021 Taliban offensive =

Military offensive by the Taliban in Afghanistan

- Part of the War in Afghanistan (2001–2021), the Taliban insurgency and the war on terror
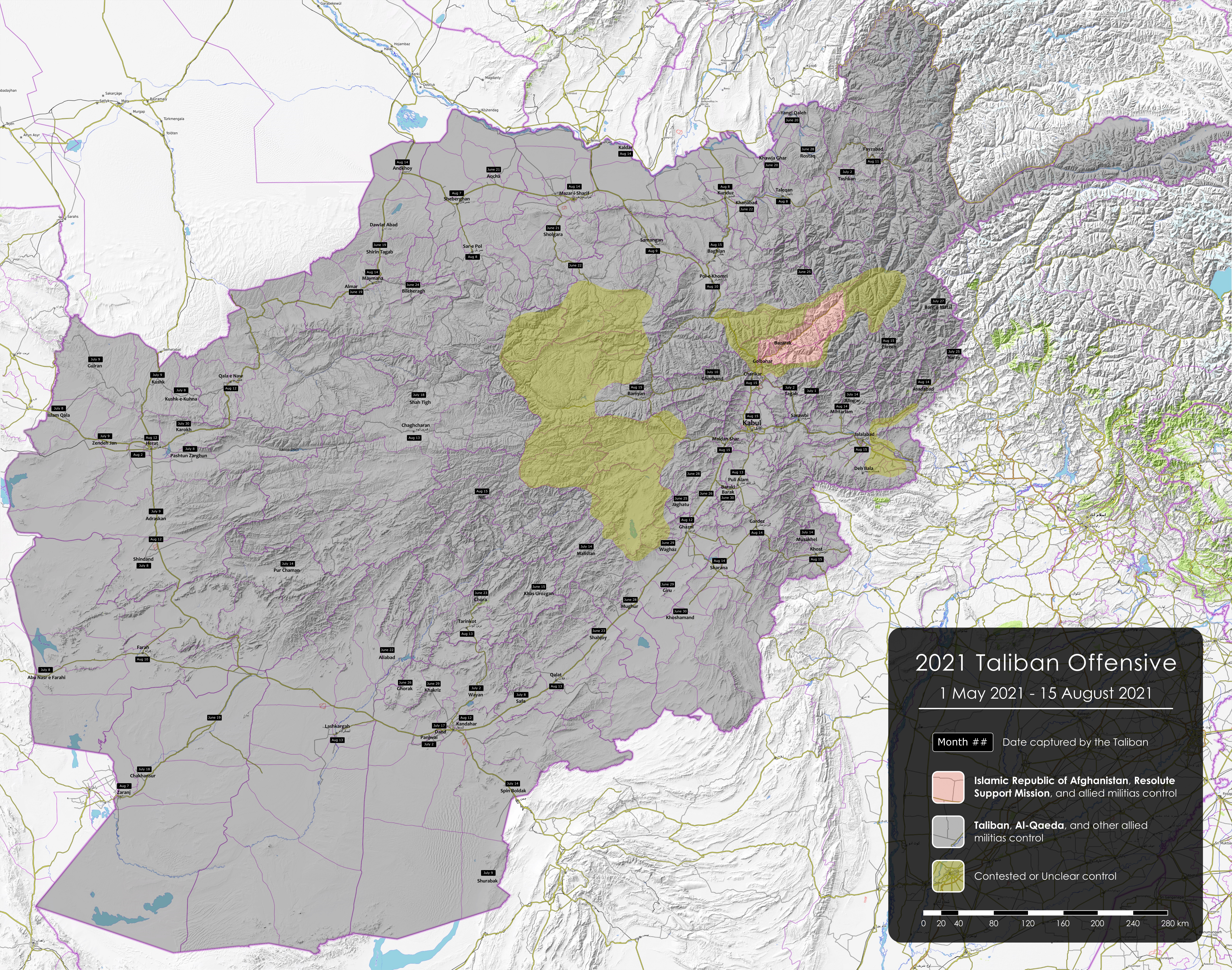
Date	1 May – 15 August 2021 (3 months and 2 weeks)
Location	Islamic Republic of Afghanistan
Result	Taliban victory: Fall of the Islamic Republic of Afghanistan; President Ashraf Ghani flees from Afghanistan; Fall of Kabul to the Taliban; Most of the Afghan military surrendered; Taliban declares the restoration of the Islamic Emirate of Afghanistan; Start of the Republican insurgency in Afghanistan; End of the War in Afghanistan (2001–2021); Evacuation of tens of thousands of civilians and military personnel; Resurgence of the Islamic State–Taliban conflict
Territorial changes	Taliban captures 232 districts and claims capturing an additional 94 districts, later controlling 305–399 districts; Taliban captures 33 of Afghanistan's 34 provincial capitals

Belligerents
Taliban; Haqqani network; al-Qaeda (alleged); Pakistani Taliban (alleged)	Islamic Republic of Afghanistan; United States

Commanders and leaders
(Taliban) Hibatullah Akhundzada; (Taliban) Mohammad Yaqoob; (Taliban) Abdul Ghani Baradar; (Taliban) Sirajuddin Haqqani; (Taliban) Anas Haqqani; (Taliban) Qari Fasihuddin; (Taliban) Abdul Qayyum Zakir; (Taliban) Abu Hamza Qudratullah; (Taliban) Salahuddin Ayubi; (Taliban) Ibrahim Sadar; (Taliban) Kari Shagasi †; (Taliban) Abdul Khaliq †; (Taliban) Mawlawi Mubarak †; (Taliban) Qari Khalid †; (Taliban) Qari Khalil †; (Taliban) Qari Jabar †; (Taliban) Mufti Ismael (WIA)	(Islamic Republic of Afghanistan) Ashraf Ghani; (Islamic Republic of Afghanistan) Amrullah Saleh; (Islamic Republic of Afghanistan) Abdullah Abdullah; (Islamic Republic of Afghanistan) Hamdullah Mohib; (Islamic Republic of Afghanistan) Bismillah Khan; (Islamic Republic of Afghanistan) Abdul Sattar Mirzakwal (surrendered); (Islamic Republic of Afghanistan) Yasin Zia; (Islamic Republic of Afghanistan) Ahmad Zia Saraj; (Islamic Republic of Afghanistan) Wali Mohammad Ahmadzai; (Islamic Republic of Afghanistan) Hibatullah Alizai; (Islamic Republic of Afghanistan) Khyal Nabi Ahmadzai (surrendered); (Islamic Republic of Afghanistan) Zabihullah Mohmand (surrendered); (Islamic Republic of Afghanistan) Khir Mohammad Arefi (surrendered); (Islamic Republic of Afghanistan) Abubaker Muradi (surrendered); (Islamic Republic of Afghanistan) Ahmad Massoud; (Islamic Republic of Afghanistan) Abdul Rashid Dostum; (Islamic Republic of Afghanistan) Atta Muhammad Nur; (Islamic Republic of Afghanistan) Ismail Khan (surrendered); (United States) Joe Biden; (United States) Mark Milley; (United States) Kenneth McKenzie

Units involved
Taliban forces: Red Unit; Martyrdom Battalion; Badri 313 Battalion; Defected local militias; Defected Afghan soldiers; Al-Qaeda: al-Qaeda in the Indian Subcontinent (AQIS); Jamaat Ansarullah forces	Afghan National Security Forces (ANSF): Afghan National Army; Commandos; Afghan National Police; Afghan Air Force; Territorial Army; Pro-government militias: Public Uprising Forces; National Directorate of Security: NDS Special Forces Units; Sangorian; CIA-backed Khost Protection Force (KPF); United States Air Force; United States Navy: USS Ronald Reagan

Strength
Taliban: c. US estimate: 75,000; UN report: 55,000–85,000 fighters 15,000 support facilitators and non-combatants Other estimates: 85,000–200,000	ANSF: c. Official figure as per US and Afghan government: 300,000–354,000(officially; including police officers, and many ghost soldiers); Other estimates: 150,000–200,000 combat-oriented troops, including an unknown number of junior and ghost soldiers.

Casualties and losses
Taliban; Afghan government claim: 9,819 killed; 5,472 wounded; 54 captured; As per media reports: Heavy losses; Equipment: Multiple D-30 artillery pieces; Multiple tanks; Multiple MRAPs; Multiple Humvees	Afghanistan; Afghan official figure: Not disclosed; As per media reports: 1,537 killed; 972 wounded; 677 captured; 2,324+ deserted; 6,000 servicemen of KPF surrendered; Thousands of soldiers surrendered; Equipment: 4 Mil Mi-17 destroyed; 3 UH-60 Black Hawk destroyed; At least 1,980 trucks and Humvees captured by Taliban; At least 35 D-30 howitzers, 3 ZiS-3 and 23 mortars captured by Taliban; At least 104 military vehicles destroyed by Taliban; 12 T-54/T-62 tanks captured by Taliban; 51 armoured fighting vehicles captured by Taliban; 8 anti-aircraft guns captured by Taliban; 1 Mil Mi-24V captured by Taliban; 4 UH-60 Black Hawk captured by Taliban; 9 Mil Mi-17 captured by Taliban; 2 MD 530F captured by Taliban
- 1,031 civilians killed; 2,043 civilians injured; 244,000 civilians displaced; 40,000 injured in total

The Taliban insurgent group and allied militants conducted a military offensive in 2021 that led to the fall of the Islamic Republic of Afghanistan and the end of the nearly 20-year war in Afghanistan that had begun following the United States invasion of the country. The Taliban victory had widespread domestic and international ramifications regarding human rights and proliferation of terrorism. The offensive included a continuation of the bottom-up succession of negotiated or paid surrenders to the Taliban from the village level upwards that started following the February 2020 US–Taliban deal.

The offensive began on 1 May 2021, coinciding with the withdrawal of the United States's 2,500 troops in Afghanistan, and those belonging to other international allies. Large numbers of armed civilians, including women, volunteered with the Afghan Army in defense, while some former warlords, notably Ismail Khan, were also recruited. Despite this, the Taliban managed to make significant territorial gains in the countryside, increasing the number of districts it controlled from 73 to 223 in the first three months of the offensive. On 6 August, the Taliban launched an assault on the provincial capitals, with most of the towns surrendering without a fight, culminating with victories in weeks-long battles of major cities Herat, Kandahar and Lashkargah on 13 August. On 15 August, President Ashraf Ghani fled the country and the Taliban captured the Afghan capital Kabul with only sporadic resistance; thus, the Islamic Republic of Afghanistan's government fell, resulting in the de facto takeover of the country and the reinstatement of the Islamic Emirate of Afghanistan. The speed of the Taliban's takeover came as a surprise to many, including the governments of the United States and their allies, Russia and the Taliban themselves.

Factors prior to May 2021 included the Taliban's effective use of online social media, its strategic choice of attacking northern provinces, and the Taliban's freedom of movement on the main Afghan highways that resulted from the Afghan National Security Forces (ANSF) following the US-recommended strategy of sacrificing rural areas in favour of defending key urban centres. Factors in the ANSF loss to the Taliban included the February 2020 and April 2021 drops in US support, in which technical, proprietary software and logistics support, in particular aerial support, that the ANSF had been trained to depend on, were suddenly removed. Errors in US coalition training of the ANSF were seen as a factor, along with Afghan police extorting locals, military officers funding themselves by inventing ghost soldiers and the months of unpaid ANSF salaries that followed the April 2021 switch in ANSF salary management to Afghan military administration. Cronyism in ANSF military appointments and president Ashraf Ghani's inability to create an effective national consensus and convince local warlords were also seen as key processes of the ANSF's defeat. Afghans are also more loyal towards their traditional ethnic, tribal and even familial ties than they are to a central government in Kabul, which the provincial Taliban commanders exploited to negotiate surrender of many troops. In the long-term, the American invasion of Iraq and its shifting in focus to that region has also been cited as a reason for the Taliban's resurgence in the mid to late 2000s.

== Background ==
In September 2020, over 5,000 Taliban prisoners, including 400 accused or convicted of major crimes such as murder, were released by the Afghan government as part of the United States–Taliban deal between the United States and the Taliban. According to Afghanistan's National Security Council, many of the released prisoners who were "experts" returned to the battlefield and strengthened the Taliban's hand. Also by the time of Taliban's final offensive, most of the Afghan provincial governors had cut deals with the militants to switch sides and join the Taliban. A senior Afghan Interior Ministry official, quoted by the Washington Post, said that Taliban have recruitment teams that reach out to Afghan officials and push them to join the Taliban. He says that Afghan government suspects that a long list of governors might have Taliban ties.

The Taliban also enjoyed substantial support by various other armed militant groups, especially al-Qaeda and its associates like Jamaat Ansarullah. Militants of al-Qaeda in the Indian Subcontinent (AQIS) reportedly fought alongside the Taliban in the 2021 offensive. In the south and east, various Pakistani militant groups supported the Taliban offensive including Tehrik-i-Taliban Pakistan (which had about 5,000 fighters in Afghanistan), Harkat-ul-Mujahideen, Lashkar-e-Taiba, and Jaish-e-Mohammed.

== Offensive ==
=== Initial advances ===
In May, the Taliban captured 15 districts from the Afghan government, including Nirkh and Jalrez Districts in Maidan Wardak Province. Among the locations captured was the Dahla Dam in Kandahar Province, Afghanistan's second largest dam. During the month, 405 Afghan National Security Force (ANSF) troops and 260 civilians were killed in clashes, while the Afghan Ministry of Defense claimed to have killed 2,146 Taliban fighters including a Taliban divisional commander, Qari Jabar. By the end of May, Portugal, Slovenia, Spain, and Sweden had completely withdrawn their forces from Afghanistan.

In June, the Taliban captured 69 districts from the Afghan government. They entered the cities of Kunduz and Puli Khumri and besieged Mazar-i-Sharif. Among the locations they captured was Afghanistan's main border crossing with Tajikistan and the Saydabad District in Maidan Wardak Province, which is called the gateway to Afghanistan's capital city, Kabul. They captured 700 trucks and Humvees from the Afghan security forces, and dozens of armored vehicles, Boeing Insitu ScanEagle drones and artillery systems.

An Afghan Air Force Mil Mi-17 was shot down by the Taliban, killing three pilots, while a UH-60 Black Hawk was damaged on the ground after an outpost belonging to the Afghan Armed Forces was shelled by the Taliban in the same month. On 16 June, Taliban fighters executed 22 surrendering Afghan Army commandoes in the town of Dawlat Abad. Among the dead was Major Sohrab Azimi, son of retired General Zahir Azimi. He was posthumously promoted to brigadier general. Eyewitnesses said that the language the Taliban fighters spoke among themselves was foreign, indicating that the fighters were not from the area. During the month, 703 Afghan National Security Forces and 208 civilians were killed in clashes, while the Ministry of Defense claimed to have killed 1,535 Taliban fighters. On 19 June, President Ashraf Ghani replaced the Afghan National Army chief of staff, and the defense and interior ministers. By the end of June, all Resolute Support Mission's member countries had withdrawn their troops, except for the UK, Turkey, and the US.

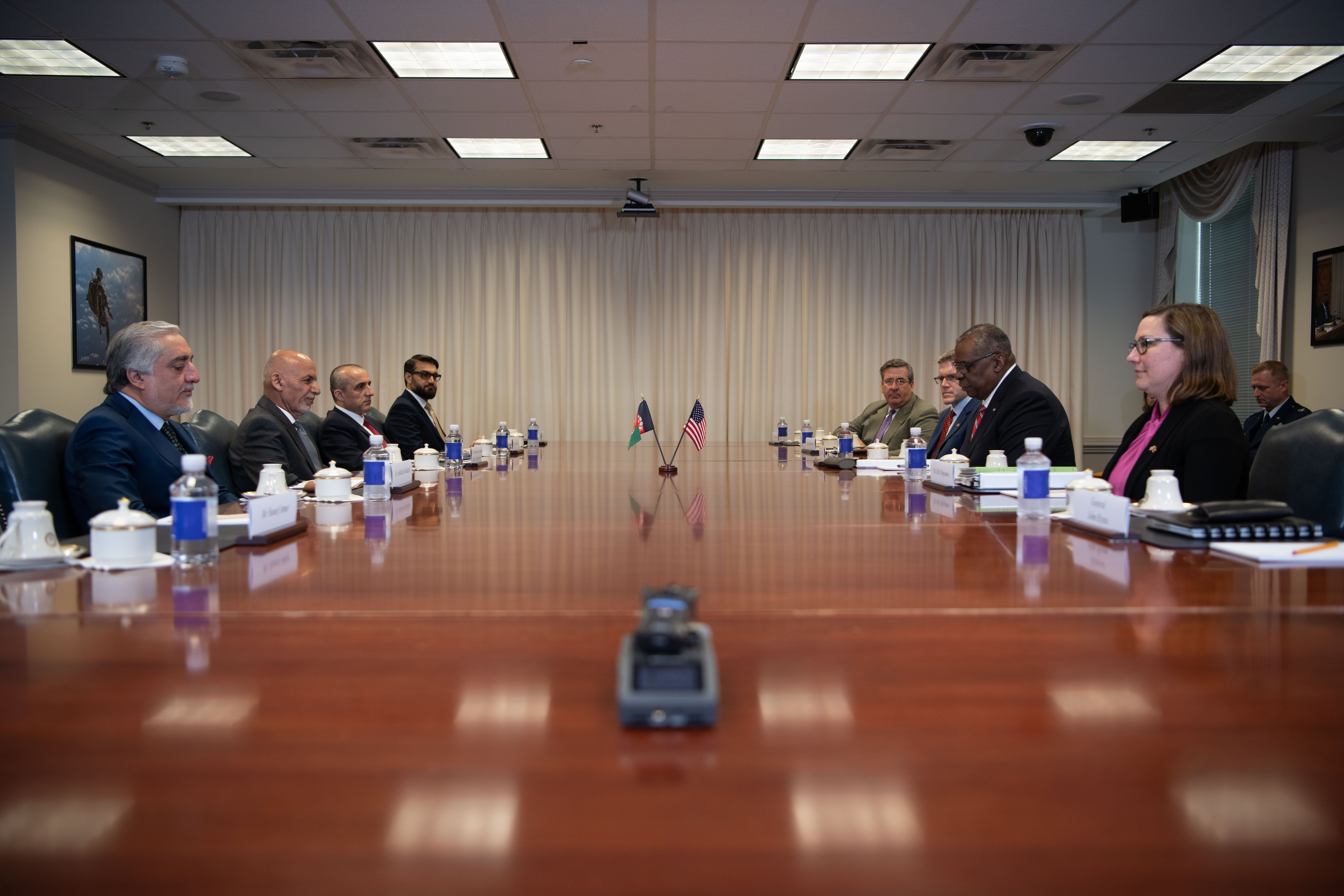
US Secretary of Defense Lloyd Austin meeting with Afghan President Ashraf Ghani in June 2021

On 22 June, the Taliban captured Sher Khan Bandar, Afghanistan's main Tajikistan border crossing, and 13 districts fell to them within 24 hours. On the same day, there was heavy fighting in Baghlan Province when Afghan forces launched an operation on the outskirts of Pul-e-Khumri, the provincial capital, killing 17 Taliban fighters, including Qari Khalid, a Taliban divisional commander. Simultaneously, Taliban forces took control of Balkh and encircled Mazar-i-Sharif, the capital of Balkh Province. On 23 June, Taliban and Afghan forces clashed inside Pul-e Khumri.

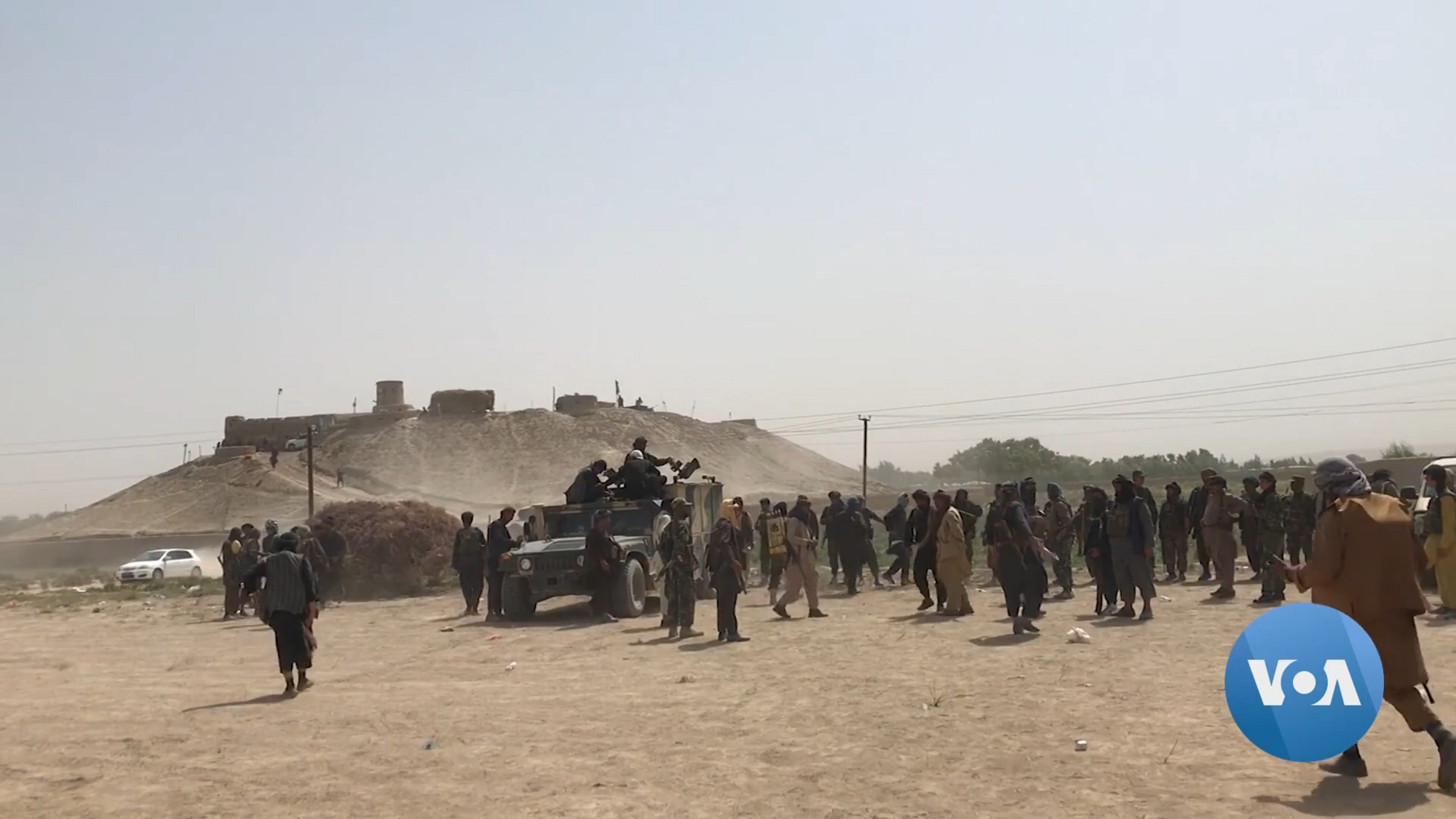
Afghan pro-government forces assemble in Jowzjan Province

On 25 June, the Taliban took control of the Shinwari District and the Ghorband District in Parwan Province, north of Kabul. That same day NBC News reported that the Taliban "were surprised at the speed of their advance and had avoided capturing some targets so as not to run afoul of the US", and the Afghan government launched a program called National Mobilization that aimed to arm militia groups to fight the Taliban. Meanwhile, Taliban deputy emir Sirajuddin Haqqani issued a series of instructions on Voice of Jihad for the governance of territories seized in the offensive. FDD's Long War Journal researcher Thomas Joscelyn argued that Haqqani's statements "read like those that would be issued by the head of a nation".

On 27 June, Chaki Wardak District and Saydabad District fell to the Taliban after at least 50 Afghan troops surrendered and were captured by the Taliban. On the same day Rustaq District, Shortepa District and the Arghistan District fell to the Taliban. ToloNews reported that 108 districts fell to the Taliban in the last two months and the Afghan army had retaken only 10. On 29 June, the Taliban launched an offensive on Ghazni, causing violent clashes within the city.

=== Escalation ===
Frontiers and major border crossings captured by the Taliban
Frontier	Province	Country	Date captured
Sher Khan Bandar	Kunduz	Tajikistan	22 June
Ishkashim	Badakhshan	Tajikistan	5 July
Wakhjir Pass	Badakhshan	China	8 July
Islam Qala	Herat	Iran	9 July
Abu Nasr Farahi	Farah	Iran	9 July
Torghundi	Herat	Turkmenistan	9 July
Spin Boldak	Kandahar	Pakistan	14 July
Zaranj	Nimruz	Iran	6 August
Aqina	Faryab	Turkmenistan	14 August
Torkham	Nangarhar	Pakistan	15 August
Hairatan	Balkh	Uzbekistan	15 August
Ghulam Khan	Khost	Pakistan	16 August

In July, the Taliban captured 64 districts from the Afghan government and entered the second and third largest cities of Afghanistan, Kandahar and Herat respectively. During the month, 335 Afghan National Security Forces and 189 civilians were killed during the clashes with the Taliban, while the Ministry of Defense claimed to have killed 3,159 Taliban fighters. Around 1,500 Afghan soldiers deserted into Tajikistan, according to its Collective Security Treaty Organization (CSTO) envoy. Iranian media reported that around 300 Afghan soldiers and civilians had crossed the border and entered Iran to escape the Taliban.

On 2 July, Germany and Italy withdrew their troops from Afghanistan, and US troops left Bagram Airfield, handing it to the Afghan Armed Forces. Subsequent US airstrikes against the Taliban were led from the Al Udeid Air Base in Qatar and the US Navy carrier strike group in the Persian Gulf, requiring the warplanes to travel several hours to reach their targets. According to a US defence official, these airstrikes amounted to only "a handful" each day.

On the first weekend of July, hundreds of armed women took to the streets of northern and central Afghanistan in demonstrations against the Taliban offensive, the largest one taking place in Chaghcharan, the capital of Ghor Province. The provincial governor Abdulzahir Faizzada reported in an interview with The Guardian that many Afghan women, some of whom recently escaped the Taliban, have been learning to use firearms in order to defend themselves, with some having already battled the Taliban. Taliban spokesperson Zabiullah Mujahid denounced the reports as "propaganda" and declared that "women will never pick up guns against us". During the weekend, the Taliban captured nine border posts belonging to the Afghan Army in Kunar Province near the border with Pakistan, during which 39 personnel of the Afghan Army surrendered to the Taliban while another 31 fled to Pakistan.

On 5 July, Tajik President Emomali Rahmon announced the deployment of 20,000 troops on the Afghanistan–Tajikistan border, to prevent a spillover of the war into Tajikistan. On 9 July, the Collective Security Treaty Organization announced that the Russian Federation would deploy 7,000 troops on the border as well, to aid Tajikistan. On 7 July, pro-government forces defeated a Taliban attempt to capture the city of Qala e Naw. On 8 July, the Taliban captured the strategically important Karukh District in Herat Province.

On 8 July, Abubaker Muradi, deputy head of National Directorate of Security (NDS), and Khir Mohammad Arefi, a commander of a territorial army, along with dozens of other security personnel surrendered to the Taliban without a fight. Khan Jan Zafar and Mohammad Farid Akhizai, two members of the provincial council, also surrendered to the Taliban on the same day.

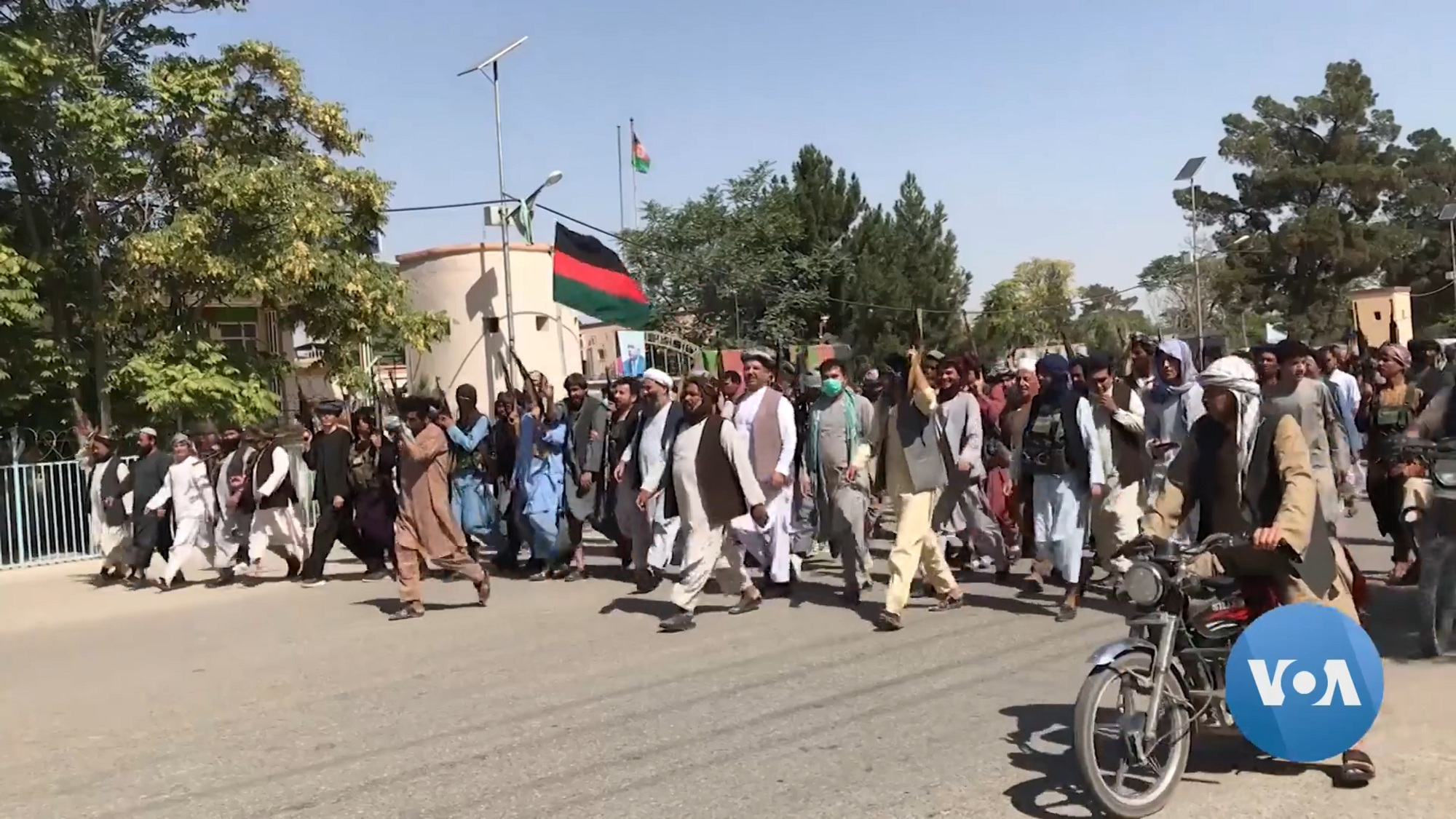
Armed locals protest in support of the Afghan government in Jowzjan Province on 13 July 2021

On 10 July, the Taliban captured Panjwayi District in Kandahar Province and surrounded the city of Ghazni in central Afghanistan. The border crossings of Torghundi with Turkmenistan and Islam Qala with Iran were captured by the Taliban. During the capture of the Islam Qala border crossing, some Afghan security and customs officials fled across the border with Iran to escape the Taliban. On 11 July, Australian Defence Minister Peter Dutton announced the end of its military presence in Afghanistan, with the last 80 personnel having left the country in recent weeks. On 12 July, the commander of US and NATO forces in Afghanistan Austin S. Miller stepped down from his post. The same day Afghanistan's foreign ministry announced that they have killed Taliban's intelligence chief, Kari Shagasi, and arrested two of his followers in Logar province. As of 12 July, the Taliban had seized 148 districts from the Afghan government. On 14 July, the Afghan border post at Spin Boldak was captured by the Taliban force; Reuters Indian journalist Danish Siddiqui was killed there while covering the fighting two days later.

On 12 July, Turkmen President Gurbanguly Berdimuhamedow ordered the deployment of troops, heavy weapons, and armour on the Afghanistan–Turkmenistan border, to prevent a spillover of the conflict into Turkmenistan. On 16 July, Uzbekistan hosted a conference between a number of the region's leaders and foreign diplomats, including Afghan President Ghani, to promote peace and prevent a civil war. Later that month, the Taliban captured Wakhan District and so was also in control of the Afghanistan-China border.

On 21 July, Chairman of the Joint Chiefs of Staff Mark Milley reported that half of all Afghan districts were under Taliban control and that momentum was "sort of" on the side with the Taliban. On 22 July, the Pentagon confirmed that the United States Air Force had carried out four airstrikes in Afghanistan at the request of Afghan officials. Two airstrikes were aimed at destroying military equipment captured by the Taliban from Afghan security forces; one artillery gun and one military vehicle were destroyed. Meanwhile, the battle for Kandahar city continued, with the settlement being essentially besieged by the rebels. All surrounding districts save for Daman District had fallen under Taliban control, and only Kandahar's air field (crucial for supplying the local security forces) remained under full government control. According to the FDD's Long War Journal, the fall of Daman District to the insurgents would make it extremely difficult for the government forces to hold Kandahar city. On 22 July 100 people were killed in a mass shooting in Spin Boldak, Kandahar Province. Pro-government forces gained victories in Bamyan Province, as local militias and the police retook the districts of Sayghan and Kahmard from the Taliban, and in Herat Province, where the government recaptured Karakh District. On 24 July, the government imposed a curfew between 10 p.m. and 4 a.m. in all but three provinces of the country, to "curb violence and reduce the movements and advances of the Taliban".

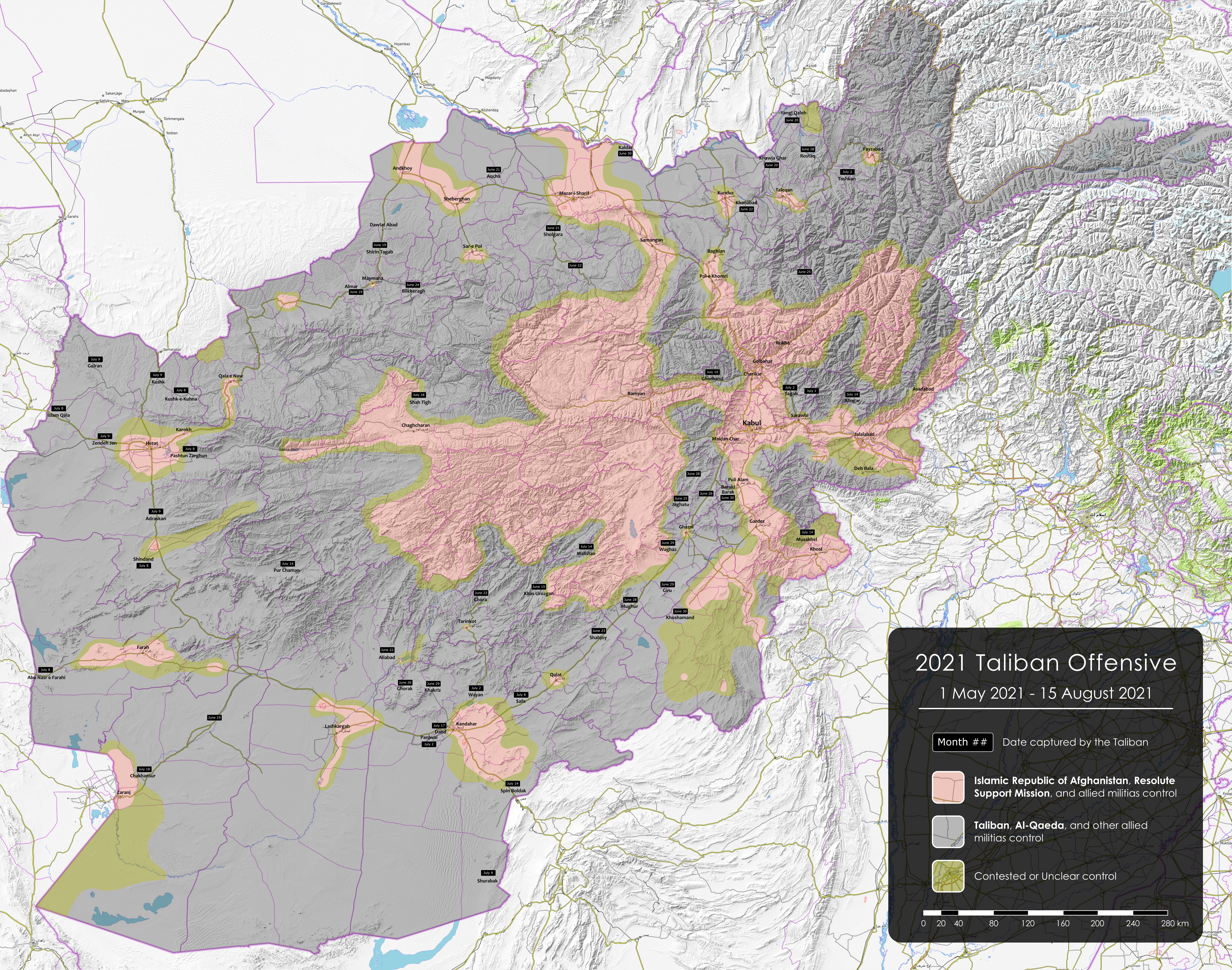
Situation on 25 July

On 25 July, a key Taliban commander, Mufti Ismael, was injured and five of his guards were killed in a mine blast targeting their convoy in Faryab province.

On 26 July, a report by representative of the United Nations Deborah Lyons showed a sharp increase in civilian deaths as a consequence of the fighting between the government and the Taliban. Lyons implored both sides to protect civilians as she says that women and children are being killed. The same day around 46 Afghan troops, including 5 officers, sought refuge in Pakistan after they were unable to defend their military post.

On 28 July, a delegation from the Taliban met in Tianjin with the Chinese foreign minister Wang Yi, who pledged the People's Republic of China's support for the Taliban on the condition that they cut ties with the East Turkestan Islamic Movement (as of 2002, 400 militants in Xinjiang region had been trained in Taliban training camps) vowing to "bring the Taliban back into the political mainstream" and offering to host peace talks between the Government of Afghanistan and the Taliban.

By 31 July, the Taliban had entered the provincial capitals of both Helmand and Herat provinces, capturing scores of districts in the provinces and also capturing border crossings with Iran and Turkmenistan. Among others, Herat's important Karakh District was again overrun by the rebels. The insurgents also cut the road between Herat International Airport and Herat city, although the airport remained under government control. The Long War Journal argued that the government's ability to keep control of Herat city without the airport supplying the defenders was questionable. Meanwhile, Kandahar city remained contested.

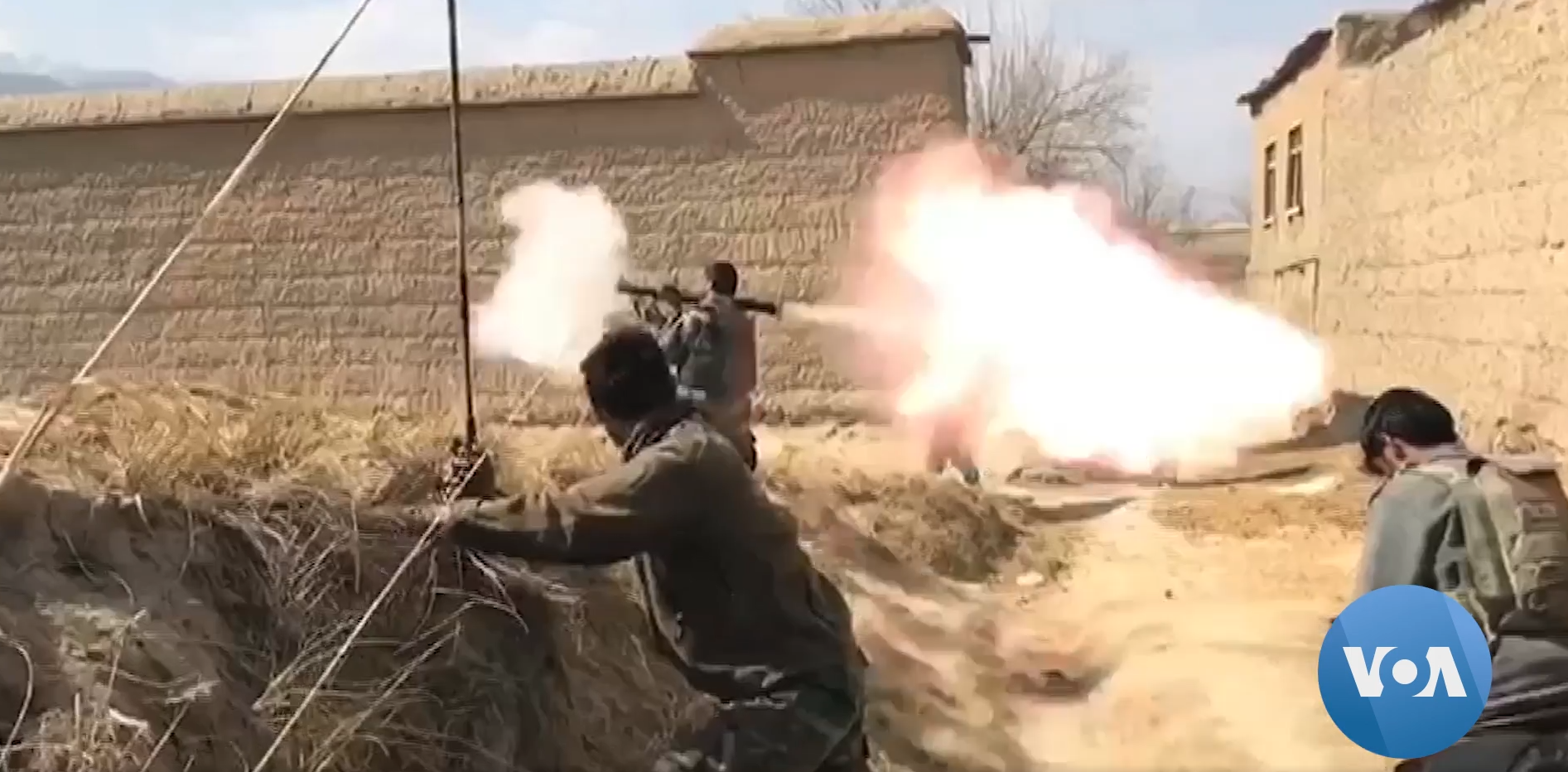
Afghan National Army soldiers in combat with the Taliban

From 1 to 2 August, the Safian, Qala-e-Kohneh and Kariz areas on the outskirts of Lashkar Gah fell to the Taliban. Clashes between Taliban and the government also took place in the suburbs of the city, with the Afghan Air Force and United States Air Force attacking Taliban positions. On 2 August 40 civilians were killed and more than 100 wounded in the fighting. After capturing Lashkar Gah's radio station, the Taliban began broadcasting their Voice of Sharia programming. The rebels also began to attack the city's airport. Meanwhile, the government dispatched reinforcements to prevent the city from falling to the insurgents.

On 3 August 13 people—including five attackers—were killed in a Taliban bombing and shootout in Kabul. The inghimasi-style operation, carried out by the Taliban's "Martyrdom Battalion", aimed at killing Defence Minister Bismillah Khan Mohammadi; he survived the attack. Mohammadi was described by the Long War Journal as one of the key government figures responsible for countering the Taliban offensive. As of 5 August 115 Afghan National Security Forces personnel and 58 civilians were killed during the clashes with the Taliban, while the Ministry of Defense claimed to have killed 3,197 Taliban fighters since the start of the month.

=== Fall of the provincial capitals ===
List of the fallen provincial capitals during the offensive
Date	Province	Capital	Order
6 August	Nimruz	Zaranj	1
7 August	Jowzjan	Sheberghan	2
8 August	Kunduz	Kunduz	3–4
8 August	Sar-e Pol	Sar-e Pol	3–4
8 August	Takhar	Taloqan	5
9 August	Samangan	Samangan	6
10 August	Farah	Farah	7
10 August	Baghlan	Puli Khumri	8
11 August	Badakhshan	Fayzabad	9
12 August	Ghazni	Ghazni	10
12 August	Herat	Herat	11
12 August	Badghis	Qala e Naw	12
12 August	Kandahar	Kandahar	13
13 August	Helmand	Lashkargah	14
13 August	Ghor	Chaghcharan	15
13 August	Logar	Puli Alam	16–18
13 August	Zabul	Qalati Ghilji	16–18
13 August	Uruzgan	Tarinkot	16–18
14 August	Paktia	Gardez	19
14 August	Paktika	Sharana	20
14 August	Kunar	Asadabad	21
14 August	Faryab	Maymana	22
14 August	Laghman	Mihtarlam	23
14 August	Daykundi	Nili	24
14 August	Balkh	Mazar-i-Sharif	25
15 August	Nangarhar	Jalalabad	26
15 August	Maidan Wardak	Maidan Shar	27
15 August	Khost	Khost	28
15 August	Bamyan	Bamyan	29
15 August	Kapisa	Mahmud-i-Raqi	30
15 August	Parwan	Charikar	31
15 August	Nuristan	Parun	32
15 August	Kabul	Kabul	33
Government control	Panjshir	Bazarak	

On 6 August, the Taliban assassinated Dawa Khan Minapal, head of the Government Media and Information Centre, in Kabul. On the same day, heavy fighting was reported in Jowzjan Province as the Taliban entered the provincial capital, Sheberghan. The Taliban confirmed responsibility for the killing of Minapal and warned that it would target senior administration officials in retaliation for increasing airstrikes. On the same day, the Taliban captured the provincial capital of Nimroz Province, Zaranj, making it the first capture by the Taliban of a provincial capital since the 2001 American invasion. Taliban executed dozens of captured soldiers in the province, and gouged out eyes of some. The rebels proceeded to open the local prisons, allowing many inmates to escape. As Zaranj had reportedly been captured with almost no resistance, Afghan journalist Bilal Sarwary voiced suspicions that someone had "sold" the city to the Taliban. Social media posts suggested that the Taliban were welcomed by some residents of the city which has a long history of lawlessness. Images appearing on social media showed Taliban fighters driving captured military Humvees, luxury SUVs and pickups through the streets while flying Taliban flags as local residents—mostly youths and young men—cheered them on. A UN envoy also warned the country was entering a 'deadlier phase' of the war. The governments of Britain and United States warned its citizens to leave Afghanistan "immediately" amid the Taliban advance and the worsening security situation.

On 7 August, the Taliban had captured Sheberghan, making it the second capture of a provincial capital. Abdul Rashid Dostum, the ex-warlord and the strongman who had traditionally dominated the city, took his followers and fled to Khwaja Du Koh District, the only area in Jowzjan Province which was still government-held. Meanwhile, pro-government forces had been reduced to a pocket of resistance in Lashkar Gah, while Kandahar and Herat remained fiercely contested. Insurgents also launched repeated raids on the other provincial capitals. On the same day, US B-52 bombers carried out airstrikes against Taliban in Afghanistan, operating from Al Udeid Air Base in Qatar. The United States was also using armed Reaper drones and AC-130 Spectre gunships which reportedly began daily attacks against targets around Kandahar, Herat, and Lashkar Gah. The remaining ground defense of Lashkar Gah and Kandahar was mostly organized by hundreds of Afghan Commandos who had become encircled by the insurgents; as these soldiers were the Afghan military's best-trained and most highly motivated troops, the FDD's Long War Journal argued that their loss would be a major setback in regards to the Afghan security forces' future effectiveness. USS Ronald Reagan was launching fast jets to provide support to the missions. The American Embassy in Kabul urged all Americans to leave the country immediately due to increased security concerns, and the inability of the embassy to guarantee the safety of American citizens due to the reduction of staff at the embassy.

The following day, the Taliban captured the cities of Kunduz and Sar-e Pol after heavy clashes with the Afghan National Security Forces. In the battles for the two cities, mass desertions were reported, as many Afghan National Army soldiers had been demotivated by the rapid rebel advance as well as Taliban propaganda. Pro-government forces were only able to hold onto Kunduz's military base and airport. Reporters described the capture of Kunduz as "the most significant gain for the Taliban since they launched their offensive in May" with the city being one of Afghanistan's largest settlements, well connected to other notable locations in the country including Kabul and considered part of a major Central Asian drug smuggling route. The battle for Kunduz involved the Red Unit, the Taliban elite shock troops, and resulted in the release of hundreds of prisoners including Taliban commanders. The city of Taloqan was also taken by the Taliban late 8 August, making it the fifth provincial capital to fall. Government forces retreated from the city after noon, retaking Warsaj District and Farkhar District.

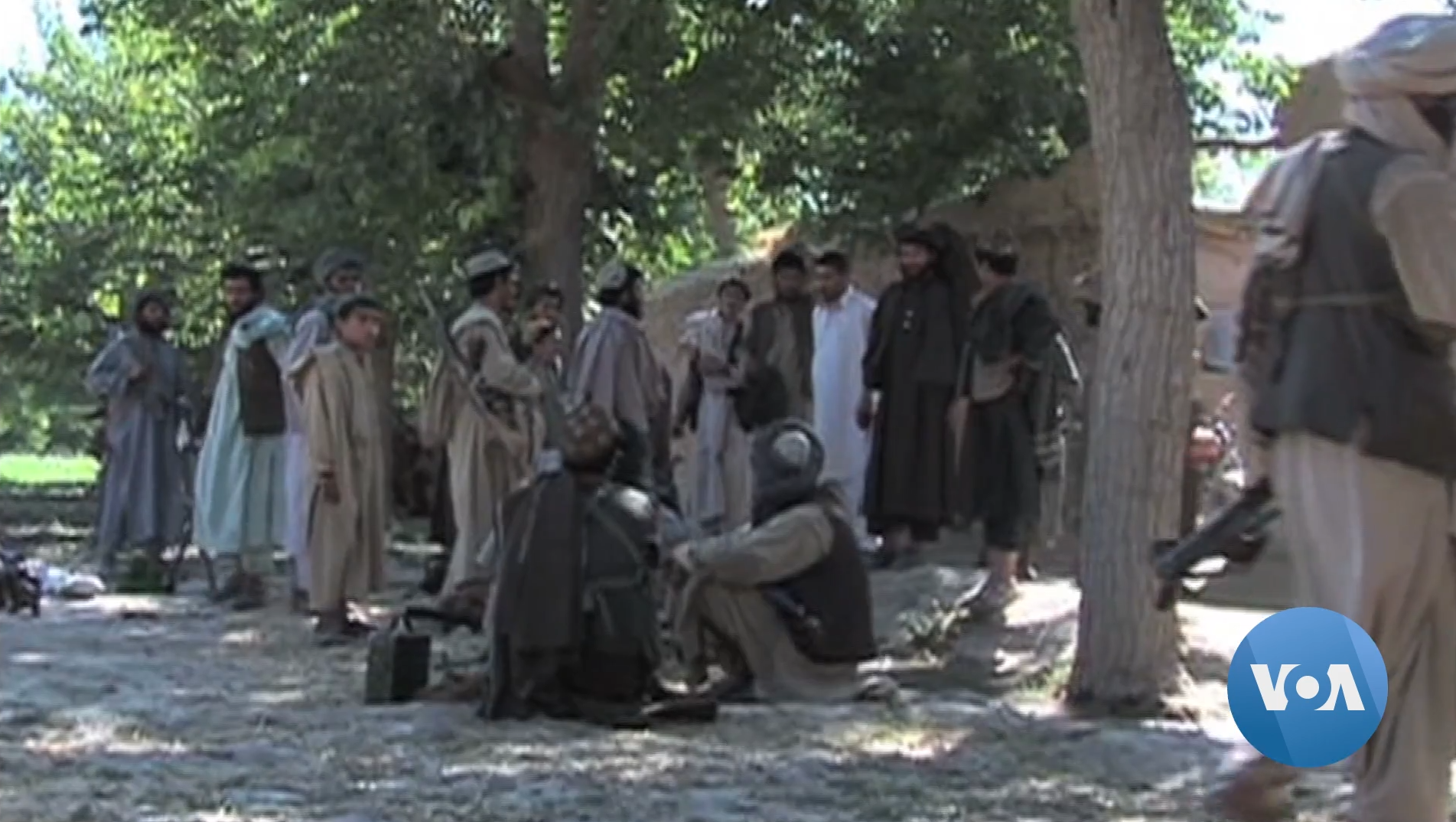
Taliban fighters resting at a village, August 2021

On 9 August, the Taliban captured Aybak, the capital of Samangan Province. Deputy governor Sefatullah Samangani told the AFP news agency that government forces had withdrawn from the city without a fight after community representatives had requested that it be spared more violence. On the same day, Asif Azimi, a former senator from Samangan and a prominent warlord from the Jamiat-e Islami party, defected to the Taliban. Azimi said hundreds of men under his command had also defected to the Taliban. President Ashraf Ghani and other political leaders also agreed to form a joint command center to coordinate and assist with public uprising forces.

Fighting intensified around Mazar-i-Sharif on 10 August. In Farah, capital of Farah Province, the Taliban had taken control of the governor's compound after heavy fighting between the Taliban and government forces. They had also taken control of the police headquarters and prison. Although heavy fighting continued, Farah became the seventh provincial capital to fall. An eighth provincial capital, Puli Khumri of Baghlan Province, was also captured on 10 August.

On 11 August, Fayzabad of Badakhshan Province became the ninth provincial capital to be captured by the Taliban. After the Taliban reached the city gates, government forces decided to retreat to Farkhar District and join with security forces there from Taloqan's fall. Prior to the US invasion, Fayzabad had been the headquarters of the Northern Alliance. On the same day, the Taliban captured Kunduz Airport and a major military base belonging to 217 Pamir Corps after hundreds of Afghan troops surrendered, securing Taliban control over their military equipment in Kunduz. The military base was responsible for security of Kunduz, Takhar and Badakhshan and was one of the eight such installations in Afghanistan; its fall further reduced the suffering morale of the Afghan National Army, while effectively making a government counter-offensive to relieve Mazar-i-Sharif impossible. Deutsche Presse-Agentur (dpa) quoted two local councillors who said that the entire 217th Pamir Corps surrendered to Taliban forces in Kunduz. A Taliban spokesman also posted a video on Twitter which purportedly showed government soldiers joining the militants' ranks. The besieged troops of the 217 Pamir Corps had held out for three days before surrendering; much military equipment was captured by the rebels at the base and airport. Additionally, the day saw General Wali Mohammad Ahmadzai's replacement by General Haibatullah Alizai as the new Afghan Army chief of staff. The outgoing General Ahmadzai served as an Afghan army chief of staff since he assumed the post in June 2021.

On 12 August, the Taliban captured the city of Ghazni, making it the tenth provincial capital to fall within a week. The city lies along the Kabul–Kandahar Highway, serving as a gateway between Kabul and the strongholds in the south. The Governor of Ghazni Province was soon arrested in Wardak for "surrendering without a fight" in exchange for safe passage. On the same day, the central government offered a proposal of "power-sharing" in lieu of ceasefire; the Taliban rejected this offer stating that it wanted to establish a new Islamic emirate. The same day also saw the fall of strategic Shindand Air Base in Herat and capture of two UH-60 Black Hawk helicopters stationed in the Air Base. Late that night, Herat, Afghanistan's third-largest city and the capital of the eponymous province, fell to the Taliban. The fall of Herat, after two weeks of siege, forced Ismail Khan and other top government officials and forces to seek refuge at a provincial airport and the army corps outside the city. In the morning, Khan along with Abdul Rahman Rahman, deputy interior minister, and Hasib Sediqi, Chief of National Directorate of Security in Herat, surrendered to the Taliban. The commander of 207 Zafar Corps, Khyal Nabi Ahmadzai, and thousands of government forces also surrendered to the Taliban. According to the local officials, an entire Afghan army Corps in the city of Herat crumbled. By this point, they controlled 11 of Afghanistan's 34 provincial capitals. The Taliban had also launched an assault on Qala e Naw, capturing the city after failing to do so in July.

Overnight, Kandahar was captured by the Taliban: heavy clashing around the city led to the withdrawal of the ANA, thus increasing the number of provincial capitals controlled by the Taliban to thirteen.

After several weeks of fighting in the Battle of Lashkargah, the city of Lashkargah, capital of Helmand Province, was captured by the Taliban on 13 August. On the same day, the Taliban took control of Chaghcharan (also called Firozkoh), the capital city of Ghor Province. Officials said the city fell without any fighting, becoming the fifteenth provincial capital to fall to the Taliban within a week. Firozkoh had a population of nearly 132,000 people. Later on 13 August, the Taliban captured Puli Alam, Qalat and Tarinkot, the capitals of Logar, Zabul and Uruzgan Provinces respectively. Government loyalists put up a determined defense in Logar before being overrun, while Zabul and Uruzgan were only surrendered to the rebels after the local defenders judged their situation to be untenable and opted to retreat. In contrast, Qalat and Fayroz Koh fell without any fighting. Qalat had been deprived of defenders who had been sent to Kandahar, and Fayroz Koh officials preferred to negiotiate a takeover instead of being "steamrolled by the Taliban offensive". The Long War Journal argued that the fall of these provincial capitals allowed the Taliban to besiege Kabul, and described the Afghan government as being on the "verge of collapse".

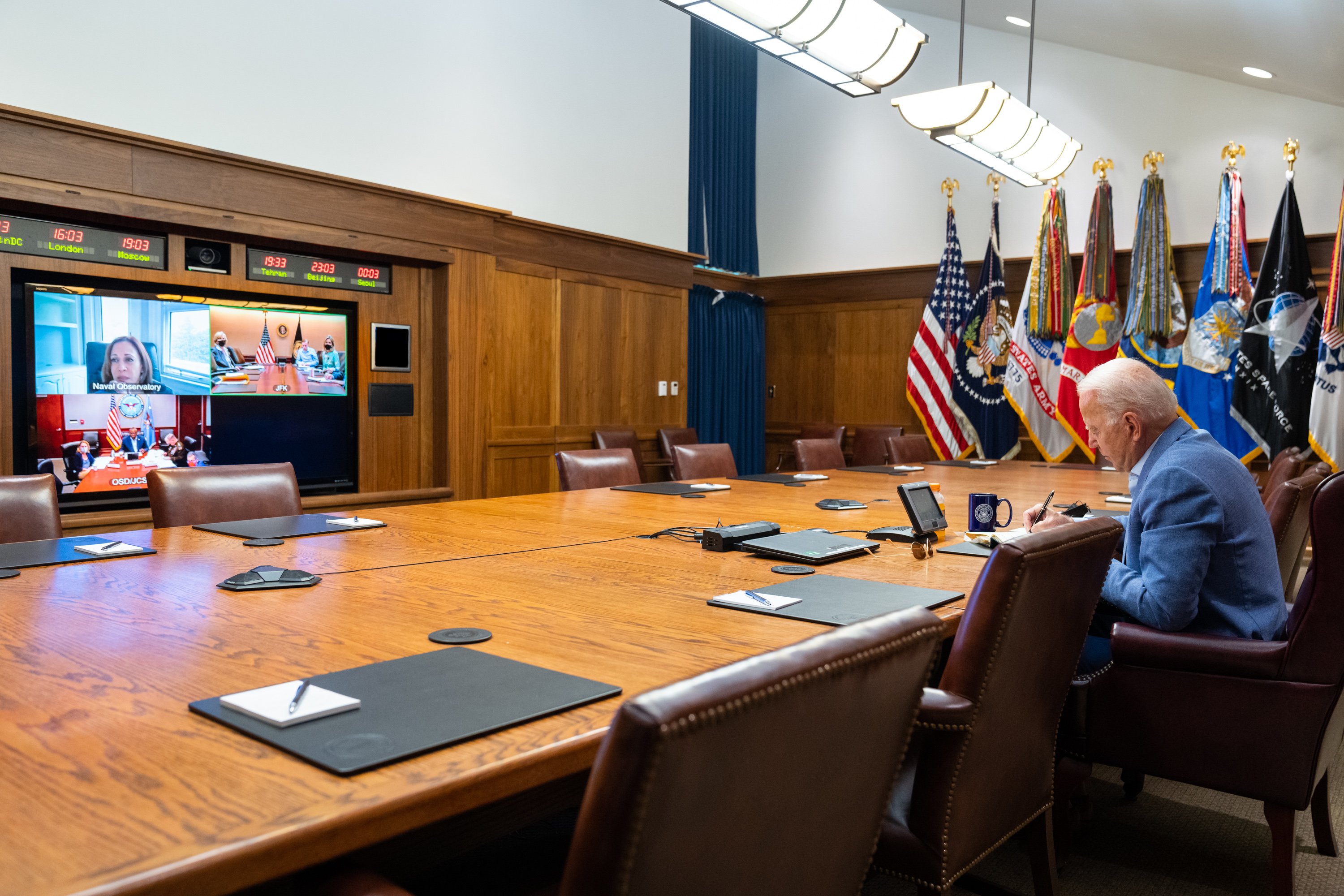
US President Joe Biden in a video conference with Vice President Harris and the US National Security team, discussing the situation in Afghanistan on 14 August 2021

On 14 August 2021, the Taliban captured seven provincial capital cities; Gardez, Sharana, Asadabad, Maymana, Mihtarlam, Nili, and Mazar-i-Sharif, the fourth-largest city in Afghanistan. Two long-time anti-Taliban warlords, namely Dostum and Atta Muhammad Nur, fled to Uzbekistan. Abas Ebrahimzada, a lawmaker from the Balkh province, said that in Mazar-i-Sharif, the national army surrendered first which caused the pro-government militia and other forces to lose morale and surrender in the face of Taliban assault on the city. Zabihullah Mohmand, the corps commander of Mazar-i-Sharif, also surrendered to the Taliban. Following the loss of the city, Atta Muhammad Nur stated in a Facebook post that his defeat in Mazar-i-Sharif was planned and held the government forces responsible for the defeat. He did not specify who was behind the conspiracy, nor provide any detail other than saying that he and Dostum are in a safe place. Later, Taliban forces also entered Maidan Shar, center of Maidan Wardak Province. At this point, the rebels had encircled Kabul, while the Afghan National Army had descended into chaos following its rapid defeat across the country. Only the 201st Corps and 111th Division, both based at the Afghan capital, were left operational.

Early on 15 August 2021, the Taliban entered Jalalabad, the capital of Nangarhar Province, unopposed. It was the twenty-sixth provincial capital to fall, and its capture left Kabul as the last major city under Afghan government control. Soon afterward, Maidan Shar, Khost, Bamyan, Mahmud-i-Raqi, Charikar and Parun also fell. Afghan commandos managed to successfully evacuate Kandahar Airport on the same day; the airport had still been held by government loyalists up to this point. Security forces surrendered Bagram Airfield to the Taliban; the airbase housed around 5,000 Taliban and Islamic State of Iraq and the Levant prisoners.

Also on 15 August, authorities in Uzbekistan detained 84 Afghan soldiers who had crossed the border, and provided medical aid to both the detained soldiers and a group of soldiers which had gathered on the Afghan side of the Termez-Khairaton bridge.

On 16 August, the Khost Protection Force (KPF), a militia unit created by the CIA in the early years of the US invasion, surrendered to Taliban forces in eastern Afghanistan after attempting to flee to Paktia Province. According to local journalists cited by Interfax, about 6,000 KPF in 1,200 vehicles surrendered to the Taliban, with a video of the surrender being posted to social media.

=== NATO airlifts ===
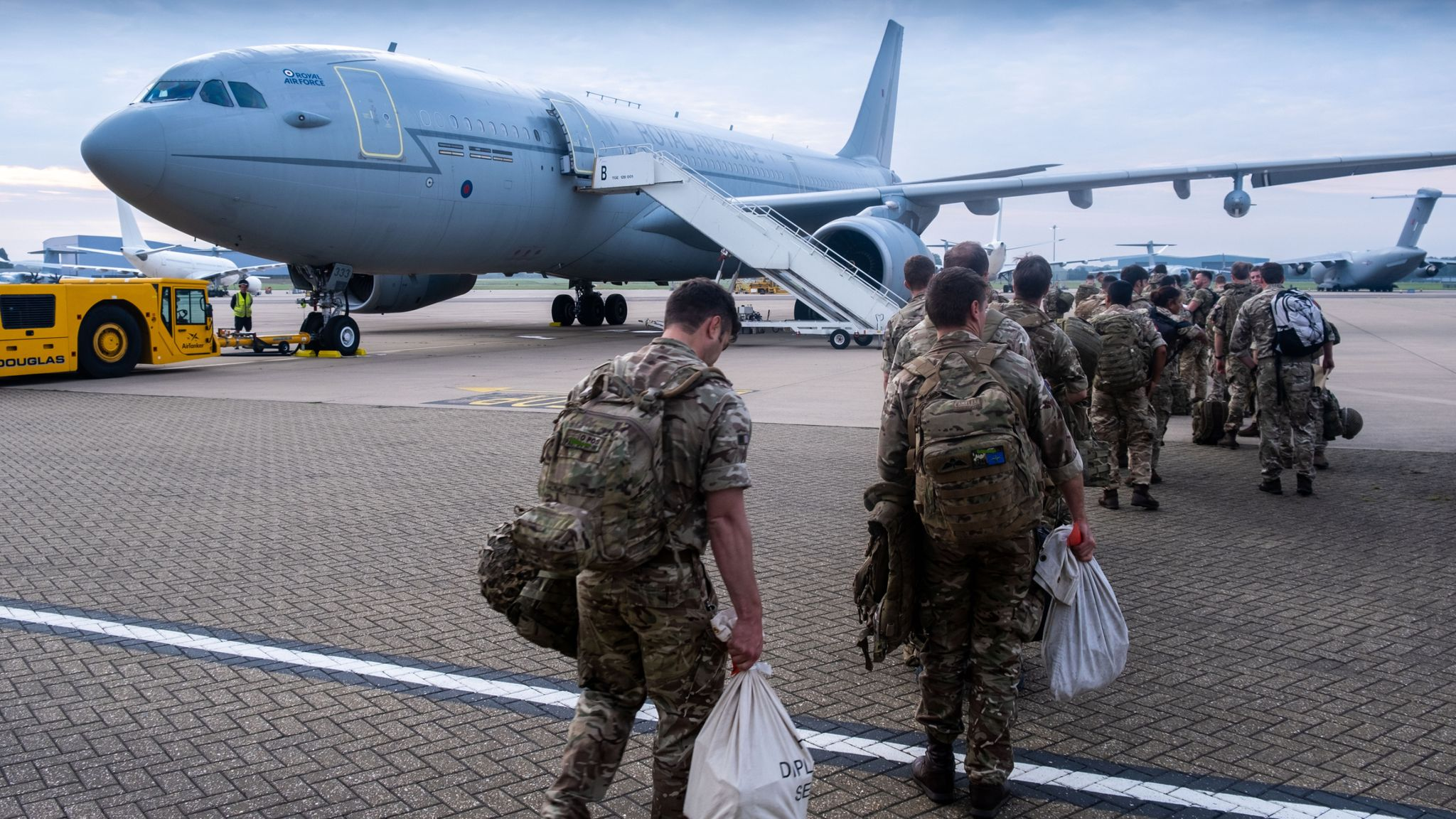
British soldiers deploying to Kabul to assist in the NATO withdrawal, 13 August 2021

On 12 August, a few hours after the fall of Herat, the United States and United Kingdom governments announced the deployment of 3,000 and 600 of their troops, respectively, to the Kabul airport to secure the airlifting of their nationals, embassy staff, and the Afghan civilians who worked with the coalition forces out of the country. Officials said that the first deployment would occur in the next 24 to 48 hours, and that it would be completed by the end of the month. According to those sources, charter aircraft were to be used for the evacuation, as the Kabul airport still allowed commercial airliners to fly at the time; military aircraft were to be used if that became impossible. According to the British government, the evacuation and its timing had long been planned, but an Afghan official said that the timing was brought forward as the security situation rapidly deteriorated. In addition to the 3,000 US troops, an additional 3,500 were placed on standby in Kuwait in case the situation escalated to a renewed armed conflict with the Taliban. Canada announced that Canadian special forces units will be deployed to evacuate embassy personnel in Kabul, which houses Afghan families who have worked with Canadian staff in the past. The Danish and Norwegian governments announced that their embassies in Kabul would close for security reasons, and proceeded to evacuate their diplomatic staff and Afghans who worked alongside them.

=== Fall of Kabul ===
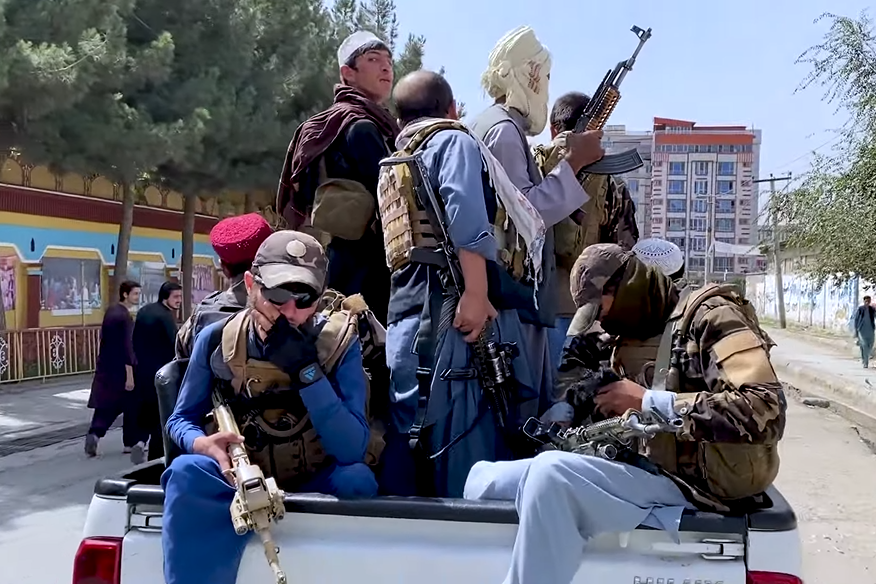
Taliban fighters in Kabul, 17 August 2021

On 15 August, despite issuing a statement saying it had no plans to take the Afghan capital "by force", the Taliban entered the outskirts of Kabul from multiple directions, including Kalakan District, Qarabagh District, and Paghman District. A citywide blackout and possible assault and inmate uprising at Pul-e-Charkhi prison was reported. Boeing CH-47 Chinook and Sikorsky UH-60 Black Hawk helicopters began landing at the American embassy in Kabul to carry out evacuations and diplomats were rapidly shredding classified documents.

The Afghan interior ministry announced that President Ghani had decided to relinquish power and an interim government led by the Taliban would be formed; former president Hamid Karzai was to be part of the negotiation team. The Taliban ordered its fighters to wait for a peaceful transfer of power and to not enter Kabul by force.

On 15 August it was reported that President Ghani had left the country for Tajikistan. Ghani's departure from Afghanistan was criticised by many Afghans and outside observers. Nikita Ishchenko, a spokesperson for Russia's embassy in Kabul, claimed that Ghani fled Afghanistan with four cars and helicopters full of money. Speaking later from the United Arab Emirates, Ghani said he left on the advice of government aides to avoid being lynched (Afghan President Mohammad Najibullah had been publicly hanged upon the previous Taliban takeover in 1996). He denied reports that he had taken large sums of money with him, noting that he had passed through customs on his arrival in the UAE. It was also considered "unlikely" by the Special Inspector General for Afghanistan Reconstruction (SIGAR), who nonetheless argues that Ghani took 500.000 US dollars with him while escaping.

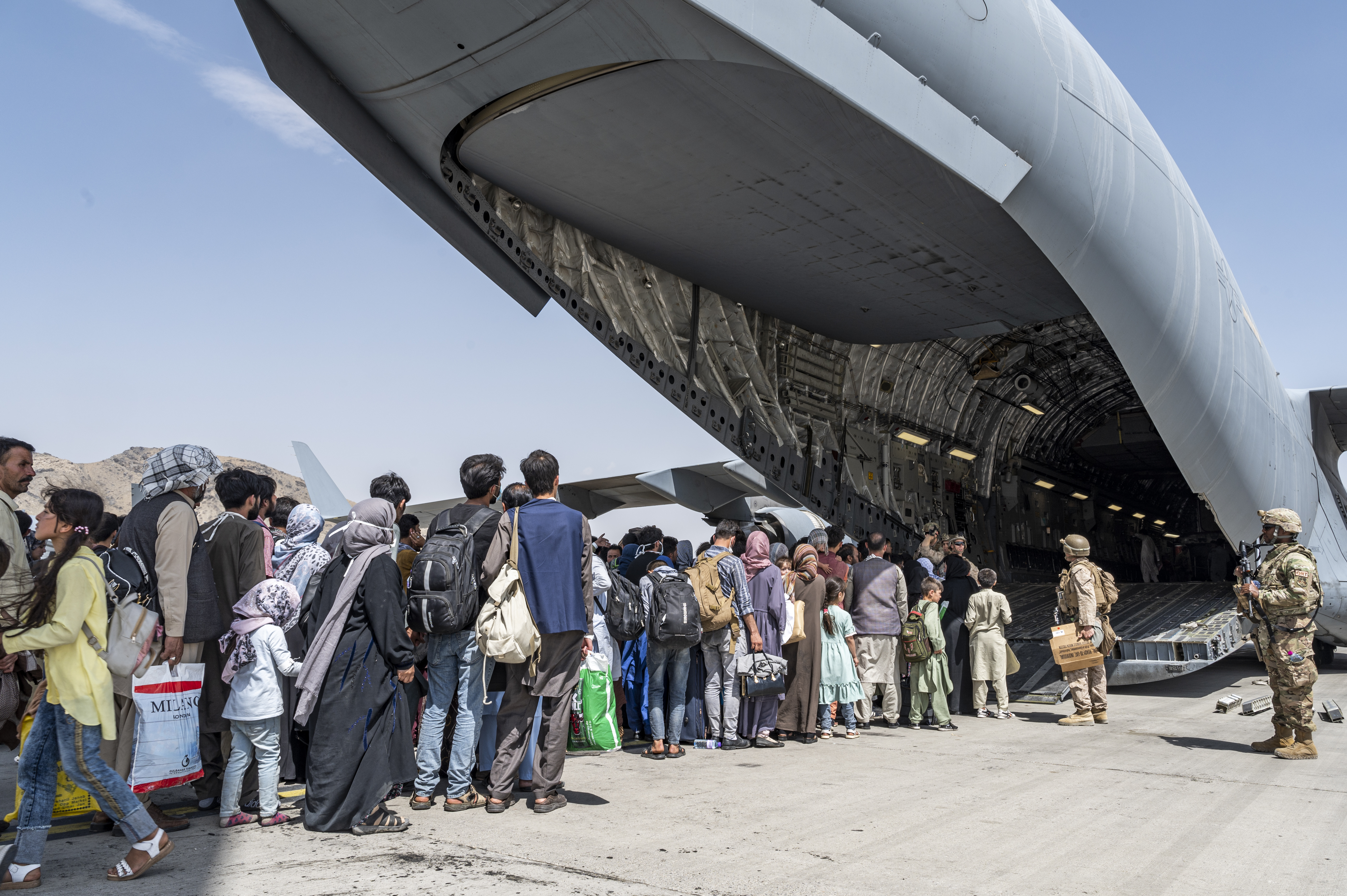
US soldiers with Afghans evacuating Hamid Karzai International Airport on 21 August, after the Taliban captured Kabul.

Late on 15 August, an Afghan Air Force Embraer 314 and Uzbekistan Air Force MiG-29 collided mid-air, with both aircraft crashing in Uzbekistan's Surxondaryo Region. The pilots of both aircraft ejected and landed with parachutes. Earlier in the day, Uzbekistan said it had detained 84 Afghan soldiers who had crossed the border seeking medical assistance while fleeing the Taliban's offensives.

On 16 August, Taliban spokesman Mohammad Naeem said in an interview with Al Jazeera that war was over in Afghanistan. He said that the Taliban have achieved what they wanted, they will not allow Afghanistan's territory to be used against anyone, nor do they want to harm anyone. On the same day, Uzbekistan's prosecutor general office said that 22 military planes and 24 helicopters carrying around 585 Afghan soldiers had arrived in Uzbekistan. Around 158 Afghan soldiers crossed the Uzbekistan's border on foot.

The Pentagon confirmed the head of US Central Command in Qatar, General Kenneth F. McKenzie Jr., met Taliban leaders based in Qatar's capital Doha. The Taliban officials agreed to terms set by McKenzie for refugees to flee using Kabul Airport.

On 23 August, Taliban spokesperson Suhail Shaheen indicated that they would be unwilling to extend the 31 August deadline for withdrawal of US forces from Afghanistan. The same day, the director of the Central Intelligence Agency (CIA), William J. Burns, held a secret meeting in Kabul with Taliban leader Abdul Ghani Baradar, who returned to Afghanistan from exile in Qatar, to discuss the 31 August deadline.

On 28 November, the Wall Street Journal reported that the Taliban used fighters who went undercover to help seize Kabul and other major cities after foreign troops were withdrawing from Afghanistan.

== War crimes ==
The Taliban committed a number of war crimes during their 2021 offensive.

On 16 June, in Dawlat Abad, 22 unarmed Afghan special forces commandos were executed while attempting to surrender. A video of the event circulated widely and was broadcast by CNN. Samira Hamidi of Amnesty International described the event as "the cold-blooded murder of surrendering soldiers – a war crime". She called for the event to be investigated as part of the International Criminal Court investigation in Afghanistan.

On 8 July, Afghan soldiers executed an Afghan villager by making him sit on an improvised explosive device (IED) before it exploded. The victim, named Barakatullah, was accused of aiding the Taliban by Afghan police and anti-Taliban militia. The father of Barakatullah denied that his son was working with the Taliban. The incident took place south of the city of Sharana, the capital of Paktika province, and the video of the incident was uploaded on TikTok. France 24 Observers team was able to verify and geolocate the video. Fawad Aman, a spokesperson for the Afghan ministry of defence, denied that any such incident took place. An Afghan journalist, Naseeb Zadran, said that this not an isolated incident and reflects the impunity enjoyed by Afghan army.

On 16 July, the Taliban killed Danish Siddiqui, a Pulitzer-winning journalist working for Reuters, in Kandahar province. His body was later handed over to the Red Cross; health officials from India and Afghanistan claimed it had been badly mutilated by Taliban fighters.

On 22 July, it was reported that gunmen killed at least 100 people in Spin Boldak District in Kandahar following the Taliban takeover of the district. The Afghan government blamed the Taliban for the killings. Human rights groups blamed the Taliban for a series of revenge killings targeting people close to general Abdul Raziq Achakzai in Kandahar.

On 1 August, the Afghan Air Force bombed a small private hospital in Lashkargah city, killing one and injuring three others. Its owner claimed his hospital had been targeted because the air force erroneously believed Taliban fighters were receiving treatment there.

On 6 August, Taliban forces claimed responsibility for the 5 August assassination of Dawa Khan Menapal, head of the governmental media and information centre, in Kabul. On the same day, during which the Taliban took control of Zaranj, human rights activist Laal Gul Laal stated that the execution of 30 soldiers by the Taliban was a war crime. According to TOLOnews, some of the soldiers were tortured and had their eyes removed by the Taliban before they were killed.

On 20 August, Amnesty International called a massacre of Hazaras by the Taliban a "horrifying indicator" for the future. The Hazara men were variously shot and tortured to death, with one strangled by his own scarf and with his arm muscles sliced off, and another with his body shot to pieces.

== Key factors ==
Key processes in the 2021 Taliban offensive started following the February 2020 US–Taliban deal, including a bottom-up succession of negotiated or paid surrenders to the Taliban from village level upwards, the Taliban's effective use of online social media, its strategy of attacking northern provinces, and its freedom of movement on the main Afghan highways that resulted from the Afghan National Security Forces (ANSF) following the US-recommended strategy of sacrificing rural areas in favour of defending key urban centres.

Both the February 2020 drop in US support and changes in US support from April 2021 played a role in weakening the effectiveness of the ANSF, by removing technical, proprietary software and logistics support, in particular aerial support, after the ANSF had been trained as an armed force strongly dependent on high-tech aerial infrastructure.

[We didn't let them] become less dependent. The Afghans couldn't deliver the food or buy the fuel, we did it for them. So we essentially made them dependent.

— John Sopko, Special Inspector General for Afghanistan Reconstruction

Errors in the US coalition training of the ANSF were also blamed, along with Afghan police extorting locals and funding themselves by inventing ghost soldiers. The sudden switch ANSF salary management in April 2021 to Afghan military administration led to months of unpaid ANSF salaries.

Cronyism in ANSF military appointments and president Ashraf Ghani's inability to create an effective national consensus were also seen as key processes leading to the ANSF's defeat. Local warlords' lack of confidence in national level political leadership contributed to their willingness to negotiate with or surrender to the Taliban.

=== Taliban strategy ===
==== Succession of negotiated or paid surrenders ====
Starting in early 2020, the Taliban started a bottom-up campaign of negotiations in rural villages with the lowest-ranked government officials. Officials named the resulting deals "ceasefires". According to Afghan and US officials interviewed by Susannah George of The Washington Post, the word "ceasefire" was misleading, since the officials were paid by the Taliban to transfer ANSF weapons to the Taliban. Continuing through to mid 2021, each successive surrender was used to help convince other governmental and village leaders and scale up in size to district level, to allow the Taliban forces to take control of much of Afghanistan without military fights. After US president Biden's April 2021 announcement confirming a full unconditional US withdrawal, the chain of surrenders accelerated, scaling up to province-level surrenders.

The chain of surrenders provided increased resources in terms of government vehicles for transporting Taliban forces.

According to Afghan special forces officers interviewed by Susannah George, some of the surrenders were motivated by the payments, while others were due to opportunism – the desire to be on the winning side that became credible following the February 2020 US–Taliban deal.

Elizabeth Threlkeld, a former US state department official, said that the Taliban's rapid advance and peaceful surrender of some Afghan army units had encouraged many others to follow suit.

==== Role of online social media ====
The Taliban used online social media to convince Afghans that "the government was illegitimate" and that the Taliban would be successful in taking control of Afghanistan. Saad Mohseni, head of TOLOnews, stated that the Taliban's "outreach was fantastic" and that they "capitalised on intratribal, ethnic, religious and ideological differences to win over people" and exploited popular complaints against the government.

The Washington Post contrasted the Taliban's claims to follow "ancient moral codes" with its "strikingly sophisticated social media tactics to build political momentum". Themes spread by Taliban social media users aimed to override the Taliban's violent reputation while remaining within social content guidelines. The Washington Post suggested that the Taliban were being advised by a public relations firm, like corporate and political actors. The audience for Taliban online social media was seen to be as much international – expatriate Afghans and "Western powers" – as local. The message promoted in mid 2021 was "a gentler, more reassuring face of the Taliban". Taliban spokesperson Suhail Shaheen has 350,000 Twitter followers. Much of Taliban social media communication was carried out on Twitter and WhatsApp, with WhatsApp used to request intervention by the Taliban in solving local problems. The Taliban had mastered effective use of hashtags by 2019.

==== Northern Afghanistan ====
During the Afghan Civil War (1996–2001), resistance to the Taliban was strongest in northern Afghanistan, the base of the Northern Alliance. According to the Afghanistan Analysts Network, the Taliban's concentration of its forces in the north may have been an attempt to forestall the creation of a second Northern Alliance after the withdrawal of US forces.

The Afghan government had not expected the Taliban to mount serious attacks in the north.

==== Freedom of military movement on highways ====
Andrew Watkins, senior analyst for Afghanistan at the International Crisis Group, said there was no evidence that the Taliban had increased their manpower to conduct this offensive, aside from utilising some of the 5,000 insurgents who had been released earlier. Watkins believes that the end of US airstrikes changed the scenario. He says that the end of US airstrikes granted the insurgents freedom of movement and they were able to regroup, plan and strengthen their supply lines without fear of US airstrikes. An international official interviewed by Voice of America stated that the Taliban had been able to move their forces freely throughout Afghanistan after the US–Taliban deal with almost no intervention from the Afghan government forces.

According to David Zucchino, writing in The New York Times, the ANSF followed US military advice to concentrate their forces on urban centres, allowing rural areas to be sacrificed. The result was that the Taliban took control of most of Afghanistan's main highways in the northern winter of 2020/2021. Zucchino saw this as a key element of the ANSF losing the war against the Taliban. The Taliban control of the highways blocked ANSF supply and reinforcement lines and yielded revenue to the Taliban who taxed truck drivers.

=== Drop in US support for the ANSF ===
According to Sami Sadat, a three-star general of the ANSF, the February 2020 US–Taliban deal resulted to an "effectively ... overnight" change in the rules for US air support for the Afghan armed forces, leading to a sudden increase in battle effectiveness by the Taliban. The April 2021 confirmation by US president Biden of the US pullout resulted in the loss of contractors, proprietary software and weapons systems including the Afghan army's helicopter missile-defence system. The Afghan army had been trained on a high-tech military model using helicopters, airstrikes and technically specialised reconnaissance units. According to Sadat, the loss of technical support made the US high-tech army model ineffective, losing helicopter support for resupplying military bases, and aerial and laser-guided weapons.

Ali Yawar Adili, country director of the Afghanistan Analysts Network, said that Afghan officials—including Ghani—never expected that the US would be halting logistical and air support to the Afghan forces. Afghan troops were heavily dependent on logistical and air support provided by the US and they were deeply shocked when US support was withdrawn.

Military historian Frederick Kagan agreed that Biden's way of making, timing and announcing his April 2021 withdrawal decision was a key factor in the defeat of the ANSF. He argued that very few US allies, including NATO members, "have the capacity to provide their own advanced air power, air cover, intelligence, surveillance and reconnaissance assets".

=== Issues with Afghan forces ===
==== The effect of promises of evacuation on the Afghan military ====
"Former Afghan president Ashraf Ghani said that some professional military and intelligence officials as well as strong army units were given promises before the fall of Kabul that they would be evacuated, and their departure was one of the main reasons for the collapse of the Afghan military."

==== Training and funding ====
According to official US "lessons learned" reports, the US coalition delayed its initial funding of the ANSF when the Taliban were weak after the 2001 US invasion, and when the Taliban were stronger, "[cut] corners on training and funding". The errors in training led to provincial police extorting money from local residents and getting paid for ghost soldiers.

==== Ghost soldiers ====
Corrupt Afghan army officers leading ghost battalions, who pocket the salaries of absent soldiers, were a known issue in the Afghan military. In a 2016 report, the US Special Inspector General for Afghanistan Reconstruction (SIGAR) said "neither the United States nor its Afghan allies know how many Afghan soldiers and police actually exist, how many are in fact available for duty, or, by extension, the true nature of their operational capabilities". In early 2019, at least 42,000 ghost soldiers were removed from the army's payroll. However, the same year Afghanistan's Ministry of Defense denied the existence of ghost soldiers in the Afghan military. The ministry's spokesman, Rohullah Ahmadzai, said that all personnel of Afghan military have physical presence on their duties and those who were involved in corruption are under investigation by the ministry.

On 30 July, SIGAR said there were "corrosive effects of corruption within the ANDSF, inaccuracies on the actual strength of the Afghan forces, lack of combat readiness, will to fight, unsustainability due to dependencies on advanced equipment, lack of focus on ministerial-level capabilities, and lack of critical information, such as assessments of district control, that could be used to help measure the ANDSF's performance in recent years".

American intellectual Noam Chomsky has linked the collapse of the Afghan army to the 2014 Northern Iraq offensive by ISIS and 1968 Tet revolt and offensive in Vietnam, in which assessments of governmental forces did not account for the massive absences due to ghost soldiers led to very similar US military debacles.

==== Lack of loyalty towards government in Kabul ====
Many Afghans are more loyal towards their traditional ethnic, tribal and even familial ties than they are to the Afghan army, which the provincial Taliban commanders exploited to negotiate surrender of many troops. Any sense of loyalty towards central government in Kabul is overshadowed by strong loyalty towards tribes and region. Mike Martin, a former British army officer, said that Ghani lacked the political skills to keep Afghanistan's many different ethnic groups loyal to the idea of a national cause. Veteran Italian general and a former Chief of Staff of International Security Assistance Force (ISAF), Giorgio Battisti, said the division of Afghanistan along the tribal lines and loyalties is "stronger than loyalty to any institution". He said that an ethnic Tajik Afghan sent to Helmand province does not understand why he has to defend ethnic Pashtun Afghans there.

Anatol Lieven, a British scholar-journalist, writes that Afghanistan "is divided along many lines, which often crisscross one another in highly confusing ways". There is tension and mistrust between different Afghan ethnic groups like Pashtuns, Tajiks, Uzbeks and Hazaras, and a deep divide between the liberal world of educated Afghans in Kabul and the people who live in the deeply conservative countryside. Lieven says that while Afghanistan has a central government and an army, in practice the central government is incapable of extending its administration to most of its own territory, or of keeping its own followers loyal to the state rather than other centers of power.

On the other hand, the Taliban were united by a militant Islamist ideology.

==== Salary payment management ====
For years the Pentagon was responsible for paying salary directly to the Afghan soldiers. The responsibility for those payment was transferred to the Kabul government since the announcement of planned withdrawal in April. Since then numerous Afghan soldiers have complained that they have not been paid in months and in many cases their units were no longer receiving food, supplies or ammunition. Gen. Wesley Clark, a former NATO supreme allied commander, told CNN that many Afghan soldiers saw the job in military as paycheck, and not a cause. He said that Afghan military is composed of various tribes and factions that were historically at odds with each other. He also said that it is an old Afghan trick to side with the winner or at least stay away from the losing side, and that is why Afghan military disintegrated so quickly.

Senior Afghan officials also sold fuel and ammunition supplies belonging to Afghan security forces.

==== Military politicisation ====
The politicisation of Afghan military resulted in unqualified politicians, loyal to Ashraf Ghani, securing key positions in Afghan military. Hamdullah Mohib, Ghani's national security adviser, took direct control of military operations despite having no military experience. According to several senior government officials and diplomats, Mohib's orders often bypassed the normal chain of command. Experts say that there were Generals in Afghan security forces that were put in charge through connections rather than capability.

Vali Nasr blamed Ghani for "fail[ing] from day one to create a political consensus in Kabul" to resist the Taliban.

General Sami Sadat said that while defending Lashkargah from Taliban forces, he was named as commander of the ANSF special forces by president Ashraf Ghani, effectively forcing him to stop leading his unit and arrive in Kabul on 15 August, by which time Sadat states that he "never even had a chance" of securing Kabul.

==== Alleged human rights abuses ====
Patricia Gossman, a senior Human Rights Watch researcher, told Insider that issues such as human rights abuses and corruption undermined state credibility in the eyes of Afghan communities and played a big role in the country's fall. Gossman said that US and its allies had aligned themselves with notorious figures in Afghanistan who were reviled by many communities because of atrocities committed by them in the past. Afghan leaders within the government, military, and police have been accused of crimes ranging from corruption to murder, rape, torture, and war crimes. Asadullah Khalid, a former Afghan defense minister, was allegedly engaged in or ordered torture, sexual violence, and extrajudicial killings, according to Human Rights Watch. Abdul Raziq Achakzai, a former Afghan National Police chief, was accused of running secret detention centers and carrying out or ordering torture and extrajudicial killings by human right organisations. Erol Yayboke, a Center for Strategic and International Studies expert, told Insider that when it came to Afghanistan, the US and its allies were "choosing the least bad partner."

=== Foreign support for the Taliban ===
==== Pakistan ====
The Taliban's victory was facilitated by support from Pakistan. Although Pakistan was a major US ally before and after the 2001 invasion of Afghanistan, elements of the Pakistan government (including the military and intelligence services) have for decades maintained strong logistical and tactical ties with Taliban militants, and this support helped support the insurgency in Afghanistan. For example, the Haqqani Network, a Taliban affiliate based on Pakistan, had strong support from Inter-Services Intelligence (ISI), the Pakistan intelligence agency. Taliban leaders found a safe haven in Pakistan, lived in the country, transacted business and earned funds there, and receiving medical treatment there. Some elements of the Pakistani establishment sympathized with Taliban ideology, and many Pakistan officials considered the Taliban as an asset against India. Bruce Riedel noted that "The Pakistani army believes Afghanistan provides strategic depth against India, which is their obsession."

==== Russia and Iran ====
Dr. Antonio Giustozzi, a senior research fellow at Royal United Services Institute on terrorism and conflict, wrote, "Both the Russians and the Iranians helped the Taliban advance at a breakneck pace in May–August 2021. They contributed to funding and equipping them, but perhaps even more importantly they helped them by brokering deals with parties, groups and personalities close to either country, or even both. [...] The Revolutionary Guards helped the Taliban's advance in western Afghanistan, including by lobbying various strongmen and militia commanders linked to Iran not to resist the Taliban."

==== India ====
Although India has not formally recognised Afghanistan's de facto rulers, it is one of a number of countries that maintain some form of diplomatic or informal relations with the Taliban. India currently has a small mission in Kabul, and sends humanitarian aid to Afghanistan, one of the poorest countries in the world. On 9th October 2025, India announced it will reopen an Embassy in Afghanistan.

=== Local warlord loyalties ===
On 12 August, former US adviser Vali Nasr, said that there was "no kind of leadership that would give local warlords reasons for why they should resist the Taliban. So the more they see the Taliban victory is inevitable, the more the victory becomes inevitable, because they just cut their own deals with them".

== US assessments ==
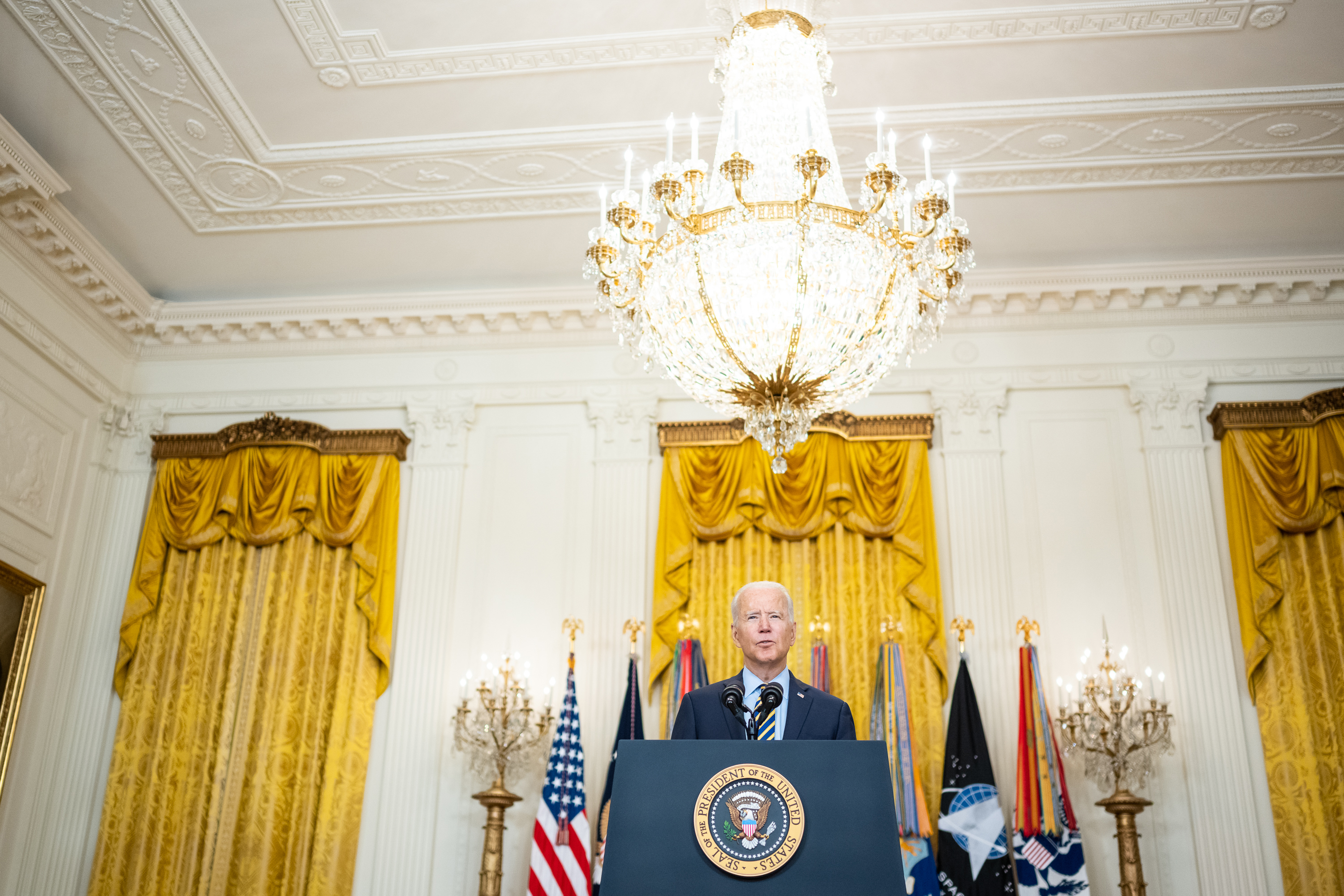
On 8 July, US President Joe Biden stated: "The likelihood there's going to be the Taliban overrunning everything and owning the whole country is highly unlikely."

On 23 June, the United States Intelligence Community estimated that the Afghan government could fall within the next six months following the US withdrawal. On 10 August, US officials revised the previous six month estimate, saying that it could happen much more quickly, and that some scenarios envisioned the fall of Kabul within 30 to 90 days. On 13 August, reports appeared that "senior Western diplomatic sources" expected the Taliban to enter Kabul within the next seven days.

On 8 July, US President Joe Biden speaking to reporters in a press conference, said that a Taliban takeover of Afghanistan is not inevitable, stating, "the Afghan troops have 300,000 well-equipped—as well-equipped as any army in the world—and an air force against something like 75,000 Taliban". Biden said that the US intelligence community had not assessed that the Afghan government would likely collapse. When asked about whether there were parallels between this withdrawal and what happened in Vietnam, the President replied:

"None whatsoever. Zero. What you had is—you had entire brigades breaking through the gates of our embassy—six, if I'm not mistaken. The Taliban is not the south—the North Vietnamese army. They're not—they're not remotely comparable in terms of capability. There's going to be no circumstance where you see people being lifted off the roof of an embassy in the—of the United States from Afghanistan. It is not at all comparable."

Biden added that "...the likelihood there's going to be the Taliban overrunning everything and owning the whole country is highly unlikely". On 15 August, during the entrance of the Taliban into Kabul, diplomats and staff were evacuated from the US embassy in Kabul via US Black Hawk and Chinook helicopters.

On 11 July, Pentagon press secretary John Kirby said that the ANDSF "have much more capacity than they've ever had before" and, "they know how to defend their country". On 9 August, Special Inspector General for Afghanistan Reconstruction John Sopko stated that the US military command "knew how bad the Afghan military was".

On 12 August, US officials said that the surprising speed of the Taliban offensive was connected to both structural and political issues, such as early under-investment in local governments, lack of sufficient nation building, societal structures in clans, topography, ghost soldiers and unequal quality of troops, as well as the recent peace agreement and amnesty of Taliban prisoners.

A report from the American Special Inspector General for Afghanistan Reconstruction (SIGAR) released on 17 August found that the US had "struggled to develop and implement a coherent strategy" for the war and that "if the goal was to rebuild and leave a country that could sustain itself and pose little threat to US national security interests, the overall picture is bleak". The report also found that the US prioritised internal political interests instead of Afghan interests, that it had demonstrated ignorance of local context, and had wasted billions of dollars on unsustainable and bureaucratic projects.

Former CENTCOM commander Frank McKenzie said that ultimately the responsibility lay with "the chain of command". The initial invasion of Afghanistan, intended to disrupt Al Qaeda's networks, had ballooned into a nation building project: "an attempt to impose a form of government, a state, that would be a state the way that we recognize a state." According to McKenzie, the US "lost track of why we were there".

== Aftermath ==
=== Civilian exodus ===
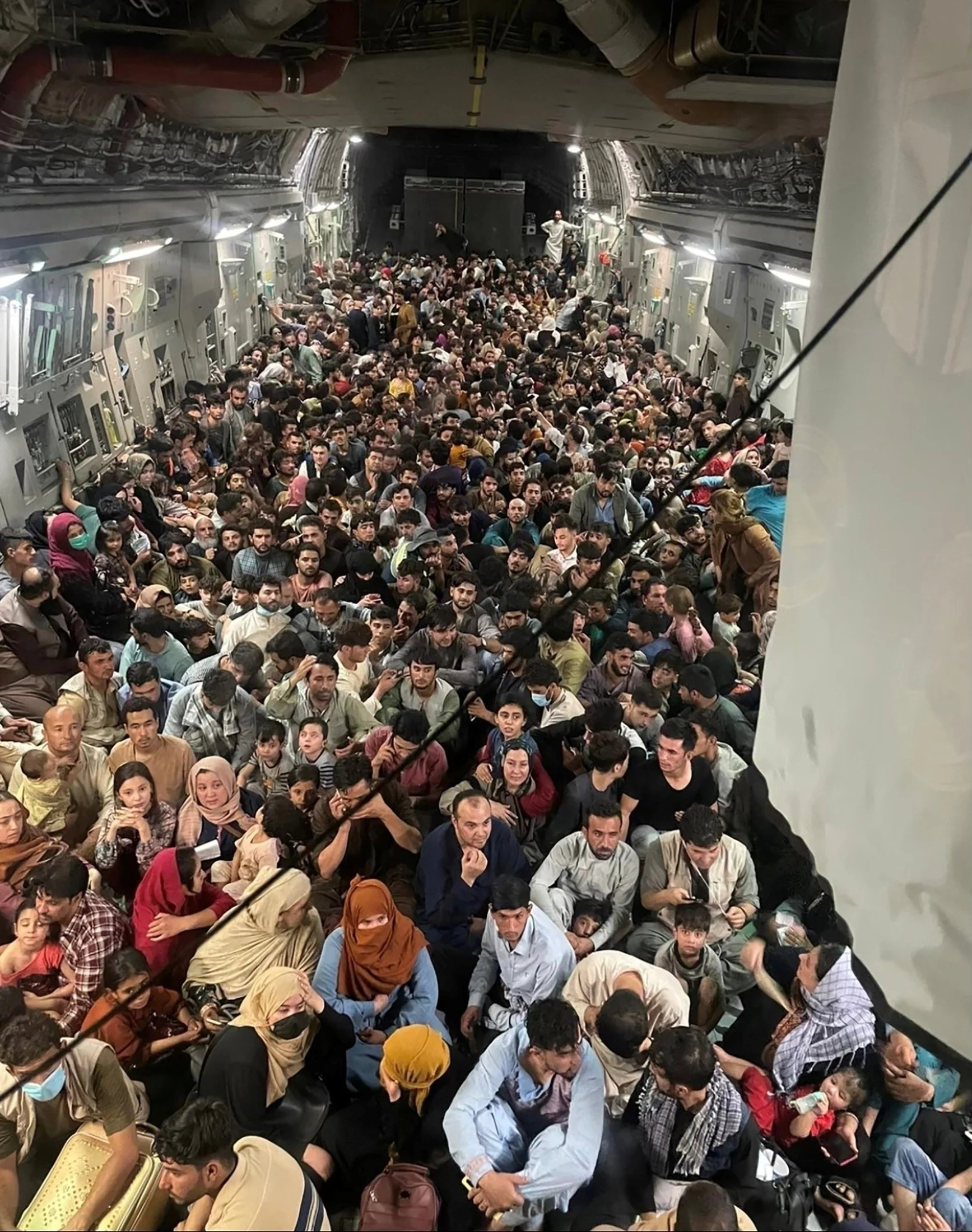
Afghans fleeing aboard a US Boeing C-17 Globemaster III during the Fall of Kabul, 15 August 2021. The Taliban offensive resulted in an exodus of Afghans.

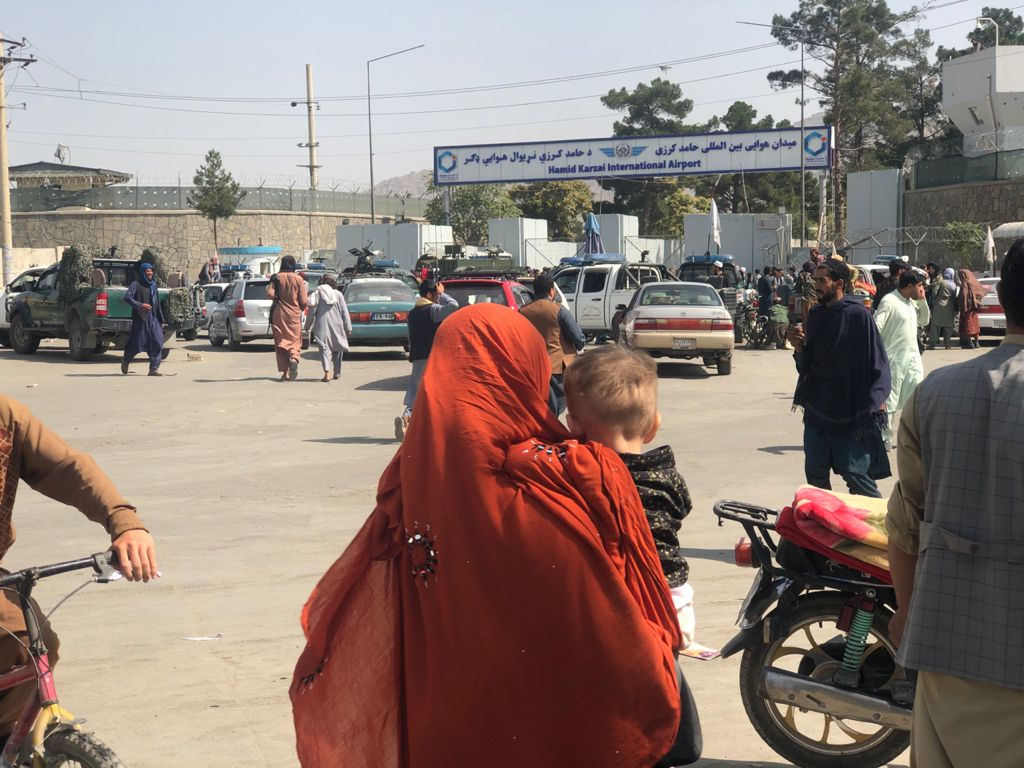
Taliban militants and civilians in front of Hamid Karzai International Airport, 17 August 2021

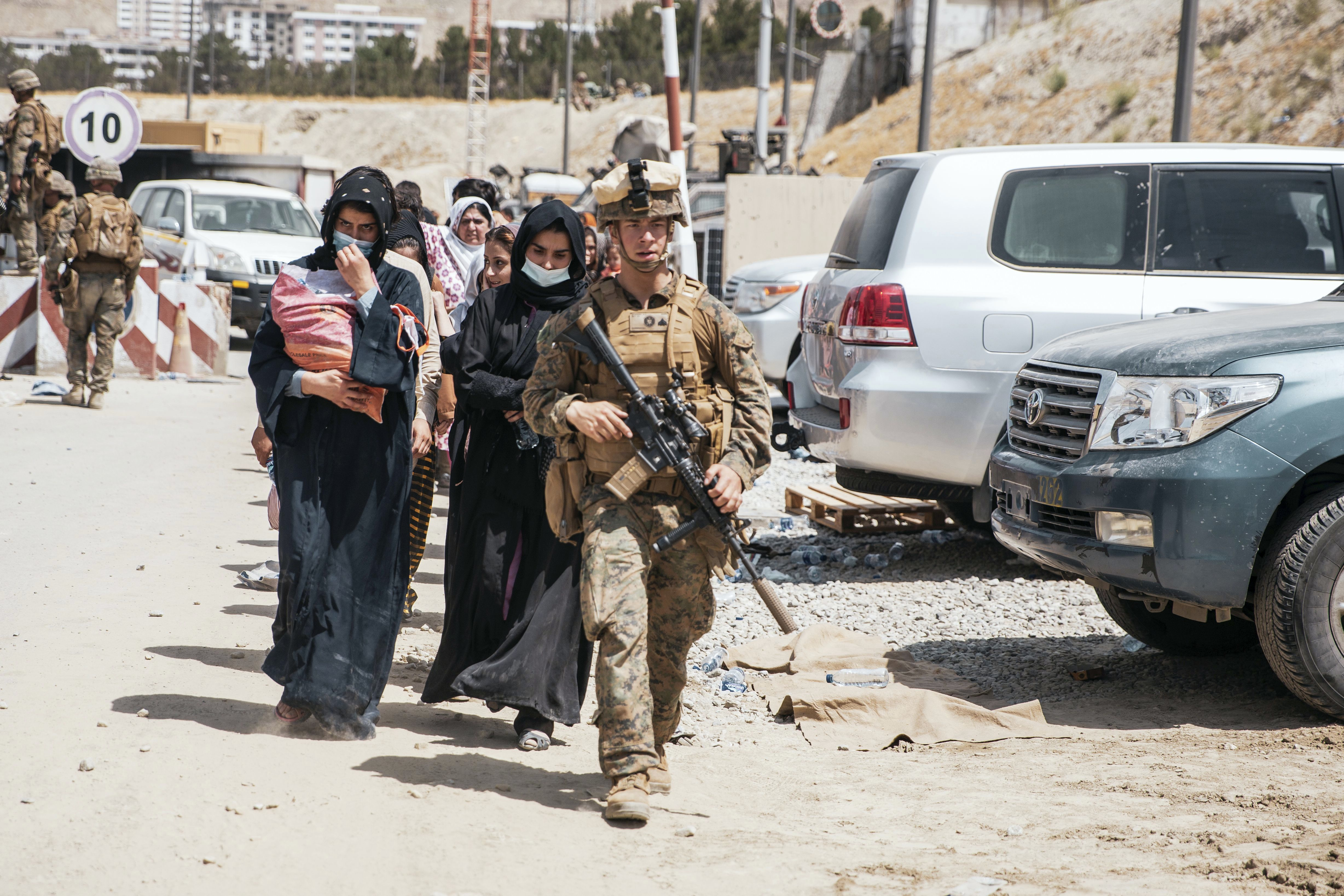
A US Marine escorting Afghan evacuees during the Kabul airlift, 19 August 2021

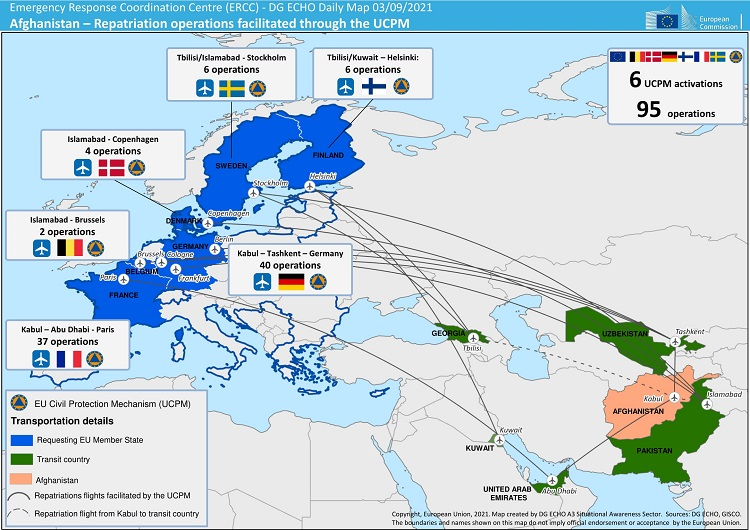
Repatriation operations from Afghanistan in August 2021

One of the consequences of the declining socio-political situation in Afghanistan was the increasing migration flow of citizens. The spillover effects of the Taliban offensive meant that thousands of civilians had started considering migrating. These migrants did not await the culmination of the war and started their move in the summer of 2021.

As the offensive was gathering pace, hundreds of Afghans in the north-east crossed across the border to Tajikistan in early July. By mid-July, Tajikistan reported that 1,000 civilians had crossed into its territory. Meanwhile, the government of Pakistan, which shares a long border with Afghanistan, ruled out taking more refugees on top of the existing ones residing there.

In late July, 1,500 migrants were detained along the Iranian border. Many others made the 1,000 mile (1,600 km) journey across Iran to cross into eastern Turkey; 200 Afghan migrants were intercepted by Turkey en route to Europe. Turkey announced the construction of a border barrier along the Iran–Turkey border, where many refugees cross into Turkey en route to Europe.

The government of Tajikistan committed to accepting up to 100,000 Afghan refugees as reported on 23 July, several weeks before the fall of Kabul.

On 7 August, Pakistan once again reported that it will not accept additional refugees, deploying its army along the border.

When Kabul fell on 15 August, thousands of Afghans attempting to flee the country rushed to the airport. In desperation, several people clung to the side of a US military plane, falling to their deaths when the plane took off. US troops eventually had to fire warning shots to clear paths for the aircraft, which were evacuating Afghan government officials.

On 17 August, India announced that it will issue an emergency e-visa to all Afghan nationals who want to come to the country, having "already received requests from Afghan Sikh and Hindu community leaders". Due to the sealed India–Pakistan border however, an influx of Afghan refugees coming through Pakistan was not a concern to the Indian government.

A small number of refugees entered Nepal via the India–Nepal border.

Both Uzbekistan and Tajikistan reported that they will temporarily host Afghan refugees as of the end of August 2021.

==== Resettlements in other regions ====
On 5 August, six European Union (EU) member states, including Germany, urged the European Commission to continue deporting rejected asylum seekers back to Afghanistan despite major advances by Taliban. A few days later, Germany and the Netherlands temporarily suspended the deportation of Afghan refugees as Taliban insurgents captured more territory.

In early August 2021, a crisis emerged when a group of 32 Afghans alongside many other migrants appeared on the Belarus–Poland border near the Polish village of Usnarz Górny and were denied entry to either country, resulting in lines of military personnel on each side isolating the encamped migrants. Their appearance follows an influx of thousands of mostly Iraqi Kurdish migrants that had crossed the border from Belarus into Poland and other eastern European Union (EU) members Latvia and Lithuania in the months leading up to the fall of Kabul, with the EU claiming that Belarus purposefully engineered the migration in response to union sanctions. While the Belarusian government denied this accusation, Poland called it a "hybrid attack" on the bloc and said the migrants should not be allowed entry because they are technically still in Belarus. After the migrants sought asylum assistance, the European Court of Human Rights (ECHR) summoned Poland and Latvia to provide them "food, water, clothing, adequate medical care and, if possible, temporary shelter" for three weeks, according to a statement from the court on 25 August, although neither country was ordered to allow the migrants past the border.

On 13 August, the Canadian government announced that Canada will resettle more than 20,000 Afghan citizens from groups it considers likely targets of the Taliban. The United Kingdom said it will allow 20,000 Afghans to settle in the UK, and the US appears likely to relocate up to 30,000 Afghan SIV applicants into the United States. Australia promised to resettle more than 3,000 Afghan refugees. Germany said it will take in about 10,000 Afghans.

More than 300,000 Afghan civilians risk Taliban retaliation because they worked for the US government. As of 17 August, there were about 11,000 American citizens stranded in Taliban-held Afghanistan.

On 17 August, the British government announced that it would be establishing a resettlement scheme for up to 20,000 Afghan refugees; prioritising women, children, and minorities. On 19 August, the government of Finland announced it planned to double its refugee quota to take in more from Afghanistan. The Philippines also expressed openness to accept refugees from Afghanistan. European Parliament President David Sassoli called for EU countries to take in their fair share of refugees, stating that the EU "will have to show it cares about respecting ethics." The Spanish government created a temporary refugee camp in Madrid–Torrejón Airport, which was later visited by officials from the European Union, including president of the European Commission Ursula von der Leyen and president of the European Council Charles Michel. Von der Leyen praised the initiative by Prime Minister Pedro Sánchez's government, stating that the actions of Spain represent "a good example of the European soul at its best". US President Joe Biden spoke with Sánchez to allow the use of Rota and Morón Air Bases to temporarily accommodate Afghan refugees, while praising "Spain's leadership in seeking international support for Afghan women and girls".

However, some governments began indicating a hostile attitude towards refugees. In a press conference, French president Emmanuel Macron stated that France needed to "anticipate and protect itself from a wave of migrants". The Austrian government announced that it would not suspend deportations to Afghanistan, unlike several other EU countries. Australian Minister of Defence Peter Dutton suggested in a TV interview that allowing Afghan civilians who had worked with the Australian government to claim asylum in Australia could pose a security risk and that "we don't know enough about those individuals". The government of Uzbekistan has warned that it will suppress harshly any attempts to illegally cross its border. It has however opened its airport in Tashkent for refugees, who will be immediately redirected to flights to Berlin as part of its agreement with Germany. In Kazakhstan, rumours regarding the Afghan migrant issues gained traction on social media in which the authorities were accused of allegedly preparing to accept as many as 70,000 refugees, with some claims that 500 Afghans had already arrived in Shymkent airport in which the Kazakh Foreign Affairs Ministry issued a response, dismissing the claims with the Kazakh government assuring that any assistance would only be provided to the UN staff.

The Government of Sebastián Piñera in Chile announced it would accept about ten refugee families. Meanwhile, the government of Colombia is planning to temporarily receive up to 4,000 Afghan nationals per request of the United States government.

The US State Department issued a statement that relocation cases would be processed in third countries, citing Turkey as a possible venue. The US had not previously discussed this possibility with Turkey. According to Bloomberg News, Turkey responded negatively and "blasted the US for recommending that Afghans fearful of a vengeful Taliban seek asylum in America from third countries". Turkey already hosts around six million refugees of the Syrian Civil War, more than any other country, and officials said it does not have the capacity to absorb the wave of refugees from Afghanistan and that it was "irresponsible" of the US administration to make these types of plans without consultation or discussion.

By 1 September 2021, the total number of evacuees numbered 124,334 people, while the total number of American service members and personnel killed in action were 2,461, with more than 20,000 Americans wounded in action. These numbers do not reflect the number of contractors and allied forces who were killed in action, nor the tens of thousands of Afghan National Security forces and civilians who lost their lives in this conflict.

=== Equipment losses ===
According to a report published on the Oryx blog, since June, the Taliban captured 12 tanks (seven T-54s and five T-62s), 51 armoured fighting vehicles (46 M1117 ASVs, two M1117 Command & Controls and three M113 APCs), 61 mortars and artillery pieces (35 122mm D-30 howitzers, three 76 mm divisional gun M1942 (ZiS-3)s, one 120 mm mortar, two 82 mm M69 mortars, one 60 mm mortar and 19 mortars of unknown origin), eight anti-aircraft guns (two 14.5mm KPV-1s and six 23mm ZU-23s), 16 helicopters (nine Mil Mi-17s, one Mil Mi-24V, four UH-60A Black Hawks and two MD 530Fs), six unmanned aerial vehicles (six Boeing Insitu ScanEagles), and 1,973 trucks, vehicles and jeeps from the Afghan armed forces. The Taliban also destroyed nine M1117 ASVs, four Mi-17s and three UH-60A BlackHawks, one DJI Mavic and 104 trucks, vehicles and jeeps. Oryx only counts destroyed vehicles and equipment of which photo or videographic evidence is available.

Since 2 July, US aircraft attacked military equipment captured by the insurgents, destroying D30 howitzers, tanks, MRAPs and Humvees.

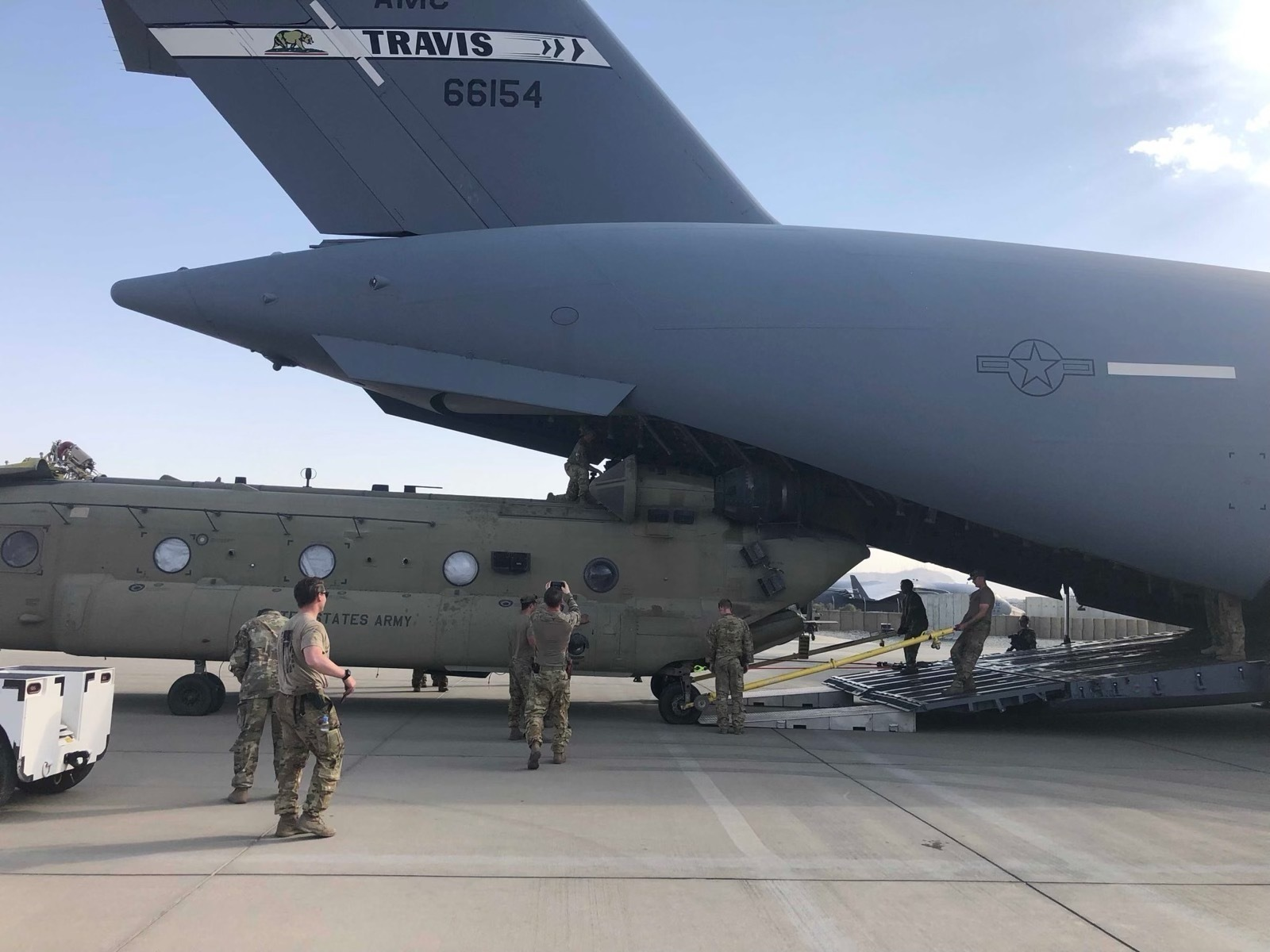
US airmen evacuating their final CH-47 Chinook onto a C-17 Globemaster III at Kabul Airport in August 2021.

On 25 August, Alexander Mikheev, the head of the Russian state exporter Rosoboronexporter, told Interfax news agency that the Taliban had captured more than 100 Mi-17 Hip helicopters of various types. Mikheev also said that a large part of this helicopter fleet could be grounded as the fleet require repairs, maintenance and spare parts. The Guardian newspaper reported that Mikheev's estimate for the number of Russian-made helicopters in Afghanistan is significantly more than the reported inventory.

In the aftermath of the Taliban takeover, claims circulated that $85 billion worth of military equipment fell into Taliban hands. However, the estimated figure is inaccurate. Total US equipment and transportation funding for the Afghanistan Security Forces Fund from the 20-year period from 2001 to 2021 is estimated at $18 billion or $24 billion. The actual value of military equipment seized by the Taliban is significantly less, because by the time of the Taliban takeover, most of the military equipment had been used up, rendered inoperable, removed from Afghanistan, decommissioned, or destroyed. In the years and months preceding the 2021 Taliban offense, the US military had also removed a large amount of military equipment and weapons. In the period immediately prior to the withdrawal, the US destroyed 70 MRAPs, 27 Humvees, and 73 aircraft, as well as CRAM systems and armored vehicles. The total number of aircraft, vehicles, and other equipment seized by the Taliban is unknown, and possibly is not even known by the Taliban itself.

It is expected that the value and utility of the equipment will decrease significantly if, as expected, the Taliban is unable to maintain the equipment or make spare parts for some of it. The Taliban does have the capacity to maintain some equipment through cannibalization, skills learned from the internet, and mechanics who choose to work for the Taliban or are coerced into doing so. This capability is especially relevant for ground vehicles, which are more useful to the Taliban than the leftover aircraft. The Taliban also lacks the technical expertise to operate some captured equipment. For example, the Taliban lack trained pilots capable of operating Black Hawk helicopters, and likely also lack the expertise to operate some military encrypted radios and anti-IED jamming devices. On the other hand, the Taliban has used US-made small arms such as M16s and M4s, and could also train pilots to operate fixed-wing C-208s, PC-12s, and A-29s. Former US Army General Joseph Votel said that the majority of the captured equipment was not equipped with any sensitive US technology.

The Taliban could sell captured military equipment to generate revenue for the new Taliban government, Jonathan Schroden of the CNA Corp. wrote that "it seems likely that at least some of the Taliban's newfound small arms will find their way to Kashmir, the Middle East, Africa and beyond." US officials expressed concern that the weapons captured by the Taliban could be handed over to US rivals or used to target US interests in the region. Ben Wallace, UK defence minister, expressed concern that Taliban could sell the military equipment to shadowy mercenaries, such as the Wagner Group.

In September, images shared online on social media showed Iranian army trucks transporting US armored vehicles, which allegedly belonged to the Afghan army before the Taliban takeover, on a highway connecting the central city of Semnan to the city of Garmsar, southeast of the capital Tehran. The vehicles included Humvees and heavily armored mine-resistant vehicles. A social media channel also claimed that Iran has taken possession of some US tanks. Bismillah Khan Mohammadi, former Afghanistan's defense minister and one of the current leader of National Resistance Front, tweeted one of the images circulating online and called Iran a "bad neighbor."

=== Human rights ===
Female MPs have gone into hiding since the offensive. The condition of women and girls dramatically degraded, both due to new policies and to economic crisis following the take over. The situation of girls, now prevented from secondary education and increasingly pushed into under-age mariages in exchange of needed money, are especially concerning.

=== Protests and resistance ===
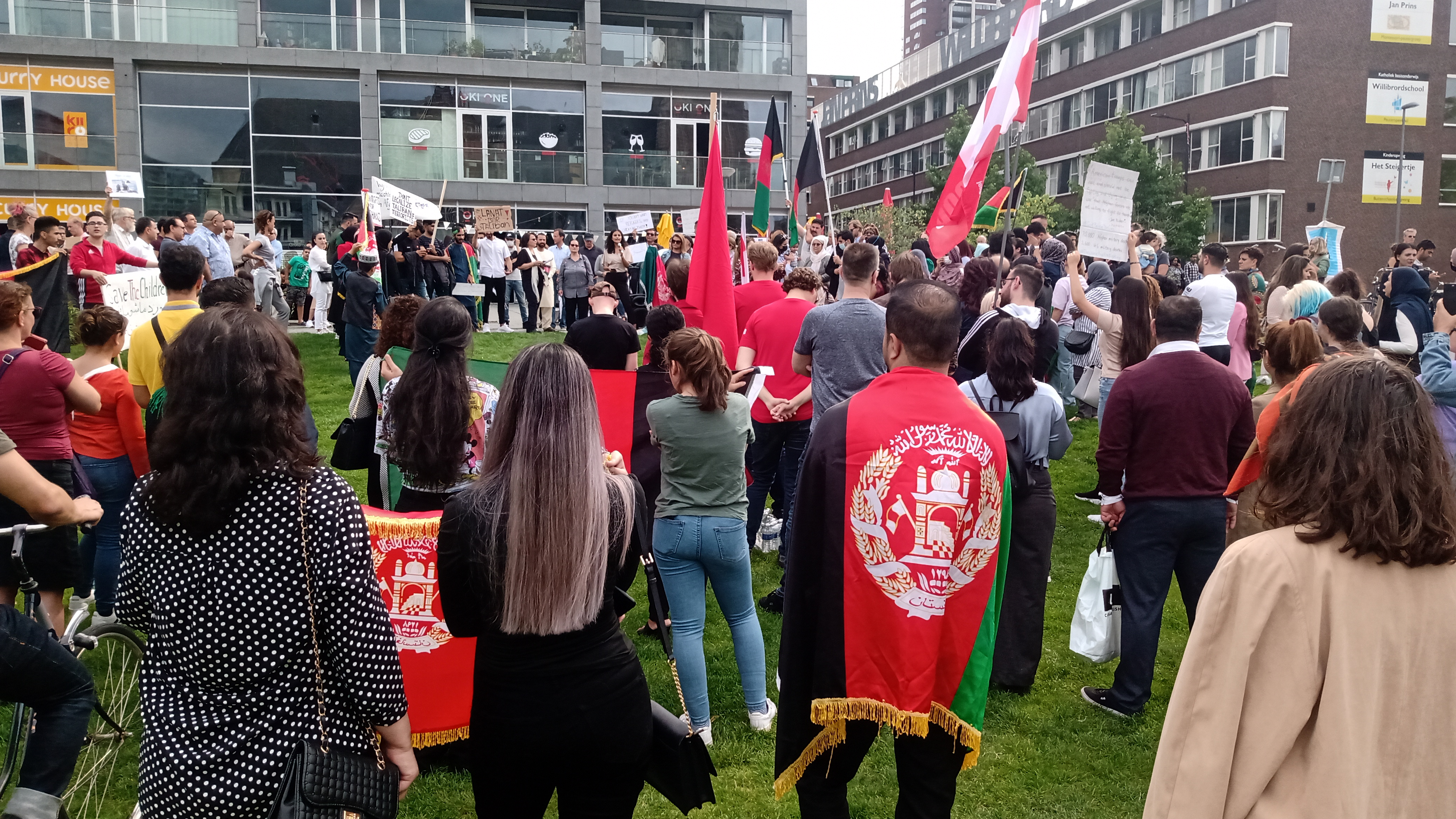
Protest in Rotterdam, Netherlands, against the Taliban's take over, 21 August 2021

After the fall of Kabul, former Northern Alliance members and anti-Taliban figures formed a military alliance called the National Resistance Front of Afghanistan, under the leadership of Ahmad Massoud and former Vice President Amrullah Saleh. They have based themselves in the Panjshir Valley, which was a major base of operations for the original Northern Alliance. On 17 August 2021, Afghan Vice President Amrullah Saleh declared himself caretaker President of Afghanistan in Panjshir Valley. With the fall of Kabul, former Northern Alliance members and other anti-Taliban forces based in Panjshir, led by Ahmad Massoud and former Vice President Amrullah Saleh, became the primary organized resistance to the Taliban in Afghanistan. The Afghan embassy in Tajikistan replaced their presidential portrait of Ghani with one of Saleh, and submitted a request to Interpol to have arrest warrants issued for Ghani, along with his chief advisor Fazel Mahmood and National Security Advisor Hamdullah Mohib, on charges of having stolen from the Afghan treasury. On 1 September, talks broke down and fighting resumed as the Taliban attacked resistance positions. On 6 September, the Taliban took full control of the Panjshir province, with resistance fighters retreating to the mountains to continue fighting within the province.

As of 3 September 2021, in addition to the opposition in the Panjshir, there are also districts in the centre of Afghanistan that are still in resistance against the Taliban, supported by ethnic and religious minorities.

==== Protests ====
The Taliban immediately replaced the previous flag (left) with the traditional black-red-green colors, with their own white flag (right). The traditional flag became a symbol for resistance during anti-Taliban protests.

On 17 August, a small protest was held by several women in Kabul demanding equal rights for women, the first reported women's protest against the new regime. On 18 August, larger protests also attended by men emerged in three eastern Pashtun-dominated cities: Jalalabad, Khost, and Asadabad, with protestors waving the flag of the Islamic Republic of Afghanistan, and taking down the Taliban flag. In Jalalabad, the Taliban opened fire, killing three and wounding over a dozen. On 19 August, demonstrations spread to various parts of Kabul, including one large protest near Kabul Airport where cars and people waved the flag of the republic, and another with over 200 people gathered near the presidential palace in Kabul before it was violently dispersed by the Taliban. Protests continued in Khost and Asadabad as well, with the Taliban using violence to disperse protests in both. In Asadabad, protests were reported as swelling to the hundreds.

=== Creation of new state ===
More than three weeks after the fall of Kabul, the new Taliban rulers announced the creation of a government cabinet for the new state named Islamic Emirate of Afghanistan. The cabinet is all male, and is heavily dominated by ethnic Pashtuns, with only three members being of other ethnicity. Hasan Akhund was named acting prime minister. As of January 2024, the cabinet officially remains in an interim state over two years after its formation.

In July 2025, Russia became the first country to internationally recognize the Taliban government, while the governments of China, the United Arab Emirates, Uzbekistan and Pakistan all have accredited ambassadors to the Islamic Emirate. Additionally, the Chinese government has accepted credentials of the Taliban's ambassador to Beijing, while in 2022 the Turkish foreign minister Mevlüt Çavuşoğlu expressed the intention to internationally recognize the Islamic Emirate.

==== Security situation ====
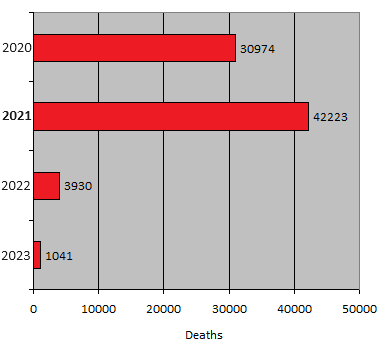
Conflict-related deaths in Afghanistan from 2020 to 2023

Violence in the country sharply declined in the year after the Taliban takeover of Kabul, with conflict-related deaths falling by 91% for the year 2022 compared to 2021. Taliban officials as well as civilians have come under attack by terror attacks committed by the Islamic State – Khorasan Province, which have also caused increasing attacks in border regions of neighboring Pakistan as well as the hit-and-run guerilla campaign by the National Resistance Front targeting Taliban.

Tourist numbers in post-war Afghanistan have increased by 120% in the year 2023 compared to 2022.

==== Economic situation ====
The service sector, making up almost half of the country's economy, fell by 30% in 2021. Within two years of the Taliban's victory, the overall economy of Afghanistan had contracted by 25%. According to Gallup polls, the number of Afghans struggling to afford commodities or struggling to find work has increased after the events of 2021.

Opium cultivation has dropped by 95% between 2022 and 2023 following an enforced ban by the new Taliban administration.

== International and local reactions ==
Some Afghan politicians closely associated with the US-backed Afghan government, including Gul Agha Sherzai, the former governor of Nangahar province, congratulated Taliban on their victory.

Iran's president, Ebrahim Raisi, said that the 'defeat' of United States in Afghanistan should offer an opportunity to "revive life, security and lasting peace" in Afghanistan. Raisi also said that Iran wanted good relations with Afghanistan and that Iran is closely monitoring the situation in Afghanistan.

Pakistan's National Security Committee (NSC) reiterated that Pakistan wants an inclusive form of political settlement in Afghanistan which represents all Afghan ethnic groups. The committee also reaffirmed that Pakistan would continue to work with the international community and all Afghan stakeholders to facilitate an inclusive political settlement in Afghanistan. The Pakistani foreign minister stated "concern over the deteriorating situation in Afghanistan" but said that Pakistan has no intention to close its embassy in Kabul. While launching Pakistan's Single National Curriculum, Pakistan's Prime Minister Imran Khan contrasted Pakistan with Afghanistan: he argued that while Pakistan's education system imposed "mental slavery" on its students (by teaching them that foreign cultures were superior), the Afghans had recently broken the "shackles of slavery". His remarks were criticized (with critics pointing out that Khan himself was foreign educated) and Khan said his remarks were taken out of context. Inter-Services Intelligence's (ISI) chief Faiz Hameed visited Kabul and met with Taliban leadership as well as other Afghan leaders including former prime minister Gulbuddin Hekmatyar. The meeting was seen as an unconventional means of contact between the two countries in the absence of a government in Afghanistan. The visit was purportedly to get berths for the Haqqanis in the new Government, demonstrating their, "clout" over the Taliban. According to the Carnegie Endowment for International Peace, the Inter-Services Intelligence Directorate shares an undeniable link with the Taliban, especially the Haqqani group.

United States president Joe Biden stated that he either had to stick to the deal his predecessor made with the Taliban and continue to pull out or send in more troops and risk their lives.

The Chinese state-run tabloid Global Times blamed the United States and its allies for what they called "the disaster in Afghanistan". The Communist Party's People's Daily flatteringly credited the Taliban's victory to its supposed adoption of Mao Zedong's "people's war" tactic: rallying the support of the rural population, while drawing the enemy deep into the countryside.

Russia's UN representative stated that it is time for national reconciliation, with law and order returning to the streets and of "the ending of many years of bloodshed". Russian President, Vladimir Putin said, "It's important not to allow terrorists to spill into neighbouring countries". Zamir Kabulov, President Putin's special envoy to Afghanistan, said the Taliban were easier to negotiate with than the old "puppet government" of exiled President Ashraf Ghani.

On 14 September, the European Parliament passed a resolution deploring the Taliban for taking over Afghanistan via force of arms, failure to uphold promises for an inclusive government, not respecting human rights and freedoms of the Afghan people, and for fighting the NRF.

=== Potential al-Qaeda resurgence ===
According to a US defense official, the security vacuum left by the withdrawal of US military forces could create an opening for al-Qaeda and other terrorist groups to reorganize. The official added that, while the US would still maintain authority to strike al-Qaeda targets in Afghanistan, the lack of a robust US presence on the ground would hamper the ability to identify potential targets. The CENTCOM commander Kenneth F. McKenzie Jr. said that he has not seen anything that would make him believe the Taliban would stop al-Qaeda from using Afghanistan to strengthen and rebuild.

British Defence Secretary Ben Wallace said that the vacuum could give terrorist groups like al-Qaeda another chance for a safe haven.

On 8 August, the head of extremist monitoring group SITE, Rita Katz, said that the Taliban advance resembled the earlier days of the Syrian civil war amid al-Nusra Front's victories, "except now on a completely different scale, given the Taliban's horrifying momentum".

Kazakh political scientist Dosym Satpaev warned that a Taliban takeover could possibly pave a way for other fundamental Islamist forces in an attempt to form a merger state of Central Asia and Afghanistan.

=== Potential Jaish-e-Mohammed resurgence ===
After the Taliban seizure of Afghanistan, The Hindu claimed that many Jaish-e-Mohammed (JeM) cadres were released, the JeM and Taliban have held meetings and the JeM has been assured of all support in carrying out its terrorist activities in India. However, Taliban spokesman Zabiullah Mujahid, in an interview with India Today denied any meeting taking place between Taliban and JeM leadership. The spokesman also said that Taliban will not allow Afghanistan to be used against India or any other countries.

== See also ==
- List of invasions in the 21st century
- Afghan Civil War (1928–1929), a similar uprising led by Emirate of Afghanistan against the reforms introduced by King Amanullah Khan
- History of the Taliban
- Talibanization
- List of 2021 Afghanistan attacks
- List of terrorist incidents in 2021
- War crimes in Afghanistan
- War crimes in Afghanistan war (2001–2021)
- 1975 spring offensive
- Final offensive of the Spanish Civil War
- 2024 Syrian opposition offensives
