= Dawa Khan Menapal =

Afghan media director and journalist (died 2021)

- Died: 6 August 2021; Kabul
- Alma mater: Kabul University

Dawa Khan Menapal (died 6 August 2021; sometimes written Meenapal, Minapal or Mina Pal) was the director of the Afghanistan government's media and information centre, and worked as a spokesman for Afghan President Ashraf Ghani. He had previously been a journalist for Radio Azadi (formerly Radio Free Afghanistan).

Menapal obtained a degree in Law and Political Science at Kabul University.

In 2008 he was kidnapped by the Taliban on the Kabul-Kandahar highway, but released three days later after protests by tribal leaders who respected his journalism as balanced and fair. In 2009, he was assaulted by Afghan police.

He won the David Burke Award for Distinguished Journalism in 2010, "for his professionalism in reporting from Kandahar, Afghanistan, despite harassment by government authorities and militants."

On 6 August 2021 he was assassinated by the Taliban, during their retaking of the country. A Taliban spokesman said he had been "punished for his deeds". He was attacked by gunmen on Darul Aman Road in Kabul while going to Friday prayers.
