= Lake Innes =

- Interactive map of Lake Innes
- Location: Fiordland, Southland District, North Island
- Coordinates: 46.177°S 166.96°E
- Primary outflows: Aan River
- Basin countries: New Zealand
- Surface elevation: 94 m (308 ft)

Lake Innes is a lake in the South Island of New Zealand. The lake is the origin point of the Aan River. It was named by surveyor John Hay after his colleague John Innes.
