= America's Auction Channel =

American satellite television network

- Country: United States
- Broadcast area: World Wide
- Headquarters: Clearwater, Florida

Programming
- Language(s): English

History
- Launched: 2002

America's Auction Channel (or AACtv) is an American satellite television network specializing in over-the-air auctions.

AACtv is an American licensed and bonded auction network specializing in live television auctions broadcast via cable television, satellite television and online. Fine jewelry, gemstones, coins and currency, real estate, and art are showcased in an auction atmosphere.

== History ==
AACtv was founded in April 2002 by Jeremiah Hartman. Hartman, previously an owner of jewelry stores and a host/vendor for Jewelry Television, saw a market for auctioning collectibles, and, after closing his last jewelry store, began America's Auction Network. Initially, the network sold just jewelry, but quickly expanded to antiques, rugs, artwork, Native American Indian collectibles and jewelry, militaria and more. Real estate was added to its repertoire in 2007.

On October 1, 2018, AAN started broadcasting as "America's Auction Channel" and owned once again by Jeremiah Hartman.

As of September 10, 2019, the network stopped utilizing Dish channel 219 for its permanent channel slot. As of the start of 2020, AAN purchases a number of weekly timeslots on Dish leased access networks to carry its programming.
