= Aan River =

River in the South Island of New Zealand

- Route of the Aan River
- Mouth of the Aan River Aan River (South Island)

Location
- Country: New Zealand

Physical characteristics
- Source: Lake Innes
  - coordinates: 46°11′06″S 166°57′53″E
  - elevation: 94 m (308 ft)
- Mouth
  - location: Foveaux Strait
  - coordinates: 46°13′47″S 166°59′17″E
  - elevation: 0 m (0 ft)
- Length: 14.1 km (8.8 mi)

Basin features
- Progression: Aan River → Foveaux Strait

The Aan River is a short river in the South Island of New Zealand.

The river flows out of Lake Innes and into the sea on the southern coast of the South Island. The river may be reached on foot via the South Coast Track, which crosses it via a suspension bridge.

It also has a tributary that drains the basin to the south of the 1189-metre high Mount Aitkin.

== See also ==
- List of rivers of New Zealand
