= Afghanistan Analysts Network =

Non-profit organization

The Afghanistan Analysts Network (AAN) is an independent non-profit policy research and analysis organization. Founded in 2009, it is registered as an association in Germany and Afghanistan, funded in large part by Scandinavian countries, and has a core team based in Kabul, Afghanistan.

Up until 2013 when AAN changed its website URL from aan-afghanistan.com to afghanistan-analysts.org, it went under the name Afghanistan Analysts Network.
