= National anthem of the Democratic Republic of Afghanistan =

Former national anthem of Afghanistan (1978–1992)

Garam ša, lā garam ša
English: 'Become Hotter and Hotter'
- ګرم شه، لا ګرم شه
- Former national anthem of Afghanistan
- Lyrics: Sulaiman Layeq
- Music: Jalil Ghahland
- Adopted: 1978; 48 years ago
- Relinquished: 1992; 34 years ago
- Preceded by: National anthem of the Republic of Afghanistan
- Succeeded by: "Fortress of Islam, Heart of Asia"

Audio sample
- Digital instrumental rendition in E-flat major: file; help

The national anthem of the Democratic Republic of Afghanistan was the official anthem used during the period of one-party socialist rule from 1978 to 1992.

== History ==
The lyrics were written by Sulaiman Laiq on behalf of the government of the People's Democratic Party of Afghanistan (PDPA) headed by Nur Muhammad Taraki, who decided to change the national symbols after the Saur Revolution of 1978. The music was composed by Jalil Ghahland and was arranged by Ustad Salim Sarmad. Like many national anthems, it was sometimes sung abbreviated with only the chorus and the first stanza. In 1987, Afghanistan officially abandoned communism but this song was kept as the national anthem until 1992, when it was discontinued.

== Lyrics ==
The national anthem consisted of three stanzas and refrains, beginning with the refrain. On many occasions, just the first chorus and verse is performed.

Pashto original

کورس:
ګرم شه، لا ګرم شه
ته‌ ای مقدس لمره
ای د آزادي لمره
ای د نیکمرغي لمره

١:
موږ په توفانونو کې
پري کړه د بري لاره
هم د تورو شپو لاره
هم د رڼايي لاره
سره د سربازي لاره
پاکه د وروري لاره

کورس

٢:
دا انقلابی وطن
اوس د کارگرانو دی
دغه د زمرو میراث
اوس د بازگرانو دی
تېر شو د سيتم دور
وار د مزدورانو دی

کورس

٣:
موږ په نړیوالو کړه
سوله او وروری غواړو
موږ زیار ایستونکو ته
پراخه آزادی غواړو
موږ ورته ډوډۍ غواړو
کور غواړو، کالي غواړو

Pashto romanization

Korus:
Garam ša, lā garam ša
Tə ay muqadas lmara
Ay də āzādi lmara
Ay də nekmarǧi lmara.

I:
Muǵ pǝ tofānuno ke
Pri kṛa dǝ bari lāra
Hǝm də toro špo lāra
Hǝm də raṇāyi lāra
Sra də sarbāzi lāra
Pāka də wrori lāra.

Korus

II:
Dā inqilābi watan
Os də kārgarāno day
Daǧə də zmaro mirās
Os dǝ kārgarānō day
Ter šo dǝ sitam dawr
Wār dǝ mazdurāno day.

Korus

III:
Muǵ pǝ naṛiwālo kṛa
Sola āw wrori ǧwaṛu
Muǵ ziyār Istunko ta
Parāxa āzādi ǧwaṛu
Muǵ warta ḍoḍǝy ǧwaṛu
Kor ǧwaṛu, kāli ǧwaṛu.

IPA transcription (Note: See Help:IPA/Pashto and Pashto phonology. The transcription is based on the Northern dialect.)

[koˈrʊs]:
[gɐˈram ʃa | lɑ gɐˈram ʃa]
[tə ɐɪ mʊqɐˈdas ˈlma.rɐ]
[ɐɪ də ɑ.zɑˈdi ˈlma.rɐ]
[ɐɪ də nek.maɾˈɣi ˈlma.rɐ]

1:
[mug pǝ to.fɑˈnu.no ke]
[pɾi kɽa dǝ bɐˈri ˈlɑ.rɐ]
[hǝm də ˈto.ro ʃpo ˈlɑ.rɐ]
[hǝm də rɐ.ɳɑˈji ˈlɑ.rɐ]
[sɾa də sɐɾ.bɑˈzi ˈlɑ.rɐ]
[ˈpɑ.kɐ də wɾoˈri ˈlɑ.rɐ]

[koˈrʊs]

2:
[dɑ ɪn.qɪˈlɑ.bi wɐˈtan]
[os də kɑɾ.gɐˈrɑ.no dɐɪ]
[dɐˈɣə də ˈzma.ro miˈrɑs]
[os dǝ kɑɾ.gɐˈrɑ.no dɐɪ]
[teɾ ʃo dǝ siˈtam dɐʊɾ]
[wɑɾ dǝ mɐz.duˈrɑ.no dɐɪ]

[koˈrʊs]

III:
[mug pǝ nɐ.ɽiˈwɑ.lo kɽa]
[ˈso.lɐ ɑʊ ˈwɾo.ri ˈɣʷa.ɽu]
[mug ziˈjɑɾ isˈtuŋ.ko ta]
[pɐˈrɑ.xɐ ɑˈzɑ.di ˈɣʷa.ɽu]
[mug ˈwaɾ.tɐ ɖoˈɖəɪ ˈɣʷa.ɽu]
[koɾ ˈɣʷa.ɽu | kɑˈli ˈɣʷa.ɽu]

Dari translation

:کوروس
گرم شو بسیار گرم شو
ای خورشید مقدس
ای خورشید آزادی
!ای خورشید نیک‌بختی

:١
ما در دل توفان‌ها
گشودیم راه پیروزی را
راه شب‌های تاریک را
راه روشنایی را
راه سرخ سربازی را
و راه پاک برادری را

کوروس

:٢
این میهن انقلابی
حال از کارگران است
این میراث شیران
حال از کشاورزان است
بگذشته دوران بیداد
حال دوران مزدوران است

کوروس

:٣
ما برای جهانیان
صلح و برادری می‌خواهیم
ما برای زحمت کشان
آزادی گسترده می‌خواهیم
برای شان نان می‌خواهیم
خانه می‌خواهیم، جامه می‌خواهیم

English translation

Chorus:
Hotter and hotter become,
Thou Sun holy and marvelous.
Thou art our Sun of freedom,
O Sun of destiny lustrous.

I:
Through the harsh storms we traversed,
The end of a road we reached.
Through a dismal past we trekked,
Yet toward light we advanced,
Thus to victory we marched,
And to kinship we triumphed.

Chorus

II:
Our land renewed and sage
In the workers' hands at last.
Lions sacred in this age
Brought down to peasants steadfast.
Now in the labourers' age,
The era of tyrants passed.

Chorus

III:
For peace and fraternity
Among proletarians;
For freedom and democracy
To the faithful labourers.
To the sworn community,
We request for victuals.

== See also ==
- List of former national anthems
- Music of Afghanistan
- National anthems of Afghanistan
