= National anthem of the Islamic Republic of Afghanistan =

2006–2021 national anthem of Afghanistan

Milli Surud Surūd-i Millī
English: National Anthem
- ملی سرود (Pashto) سرود ملی (Dari)
- In exile anthem of the Islamic Republic of Afghanistan
- Lyrics: Abdul Bari Jahani, 2006
- Music: Babrak Wassa, 2006
- Adopted: May 2006; 20 years ago
- Preceded by: "Fortress of Islam, Heart of Asia"
- Succeeded by: "This Is the Home of the Brave"

Audio sample
- U.S. Navy Band instrumental version in E-flat minor (abridged): file; help

The national anthem (Note: Pashto: ملی سرود, romanized: Millī Surūd, IPA: [mɪlˈli sʊˈrud]; Dari: سرود ملی, romanized: Surūd-i Millī, IPA: [sʊˈruːdɪ mɪlˈliː]) of the Islamic Republic of Afghanistan was used between 2006 and 2021. The lyrics were written by Abdul Bari Jahani, and the music was composed by German-Afghan composer Babrak Wassa. It was replaced by "This Is the Home of the Brave" after the Taliban takeover in 2021.

== History ==
After the end of Taliban rule in 2001, a new national anthem was created for the "New Afghanistan", which, according to the 20th article of the new Afghan constitution, was to contain the names of the various ethnic groups of Afghanistan, and the takbir had to be included. After a competition, the national anthem was officially adopted in May 2006.

After the Taliban takeover on 15 August 2021, it was replaced by "This Is the Home of the Brave". Due to the lack of international recognition of the Taliban government, the anthem is still used in sports setting such as the 2021 ICC Men's T20 World Cup in October–November, along with the flag of the internationally recognized Islamic Republic of Afghanistan. The Islamic Republic anthem and flag were also used in the 2022 CAFA U-19 Futsal Championship.

== Lyrics ==
An abridged version of the anthem is often performed by military bands which omits the third and fourth stanzas for brevity, or the second and third stanzas for saving time to memorize all the country's ethnic groups. The Olympic Games uses a version of the anthem which includes all the stanzas.

Pashto original

دا وطن افغانستان دى
دا عزت د هر افغان دى
كور د سولې، كور د تورې
هر بچى يې قهرمان دى

دا وطن د ټولو كور دى
د بلوڅو، د ازبكو
د پښتون او هزاراهو
د تركمنو، د تاجكو

ور سره عرب، ګوجر دي
پاميريان، نورستانيان
براهوي دي، قزلباش دي
هم ايماق، هم پشه‌ييان

دا هېواد به تل ځلېږي
لكه لمر پر شنه آسمان
په سينې كې د آسيا به
لكه زړه وي جاوېدان

نوم د حق مو دى رهبر
وايو الله اكبر
وايو الله اكبر
وايو الله اكبر

Pashto Romanization

Dā watan Afǧānistān day,
Dā izat də har Afǧān day.
Kor də sole, kor də ture,
Har bacay ye qahramān day.

Dā watan də ṭolo kor day,
Də Balośo, də Uzbako;
Də Pəx̌tun aw Hazārāho,
Də Turkmano, də Tājiko.

War sara Arab, Gujar di,
Pāmiriyān, Nūristānyān;
Brāhawi di, Qizilbāš di,
Həm Aymāq, həm Pašayiyān.

Dā hewād ba təl źaleǵi,
Laka lmar pər šnə āsmān.
Pə sine ke də Āsyā ba,
Laka zṛə wi jāwedān.

Num də haq mo day rahbar:
Wāyu «Allāhu Akbar!»
Wāyu «Allāhu Akbar!»
Wāyu «Allāhu Akbar!»

IPA transcription (Note: See Help:IPA and Pashto phonology. The transcription is based on the Northern dialect.)

[d̪ɑ waˈt̪an avˌɣɑ.nɪˈst̪ɑn d̪aɪ |]
[d̪ɑ ʔɪˈzat̪ d̪ə haɾ avˈɣɑn d̪aɪ ‖]
[koɾ d̪ə ˈso.le koɾ d̪ə ˈt̪u.re |]
[haɾ baˈtʃaɪ je qah.raˈmɑn d̪aɪ ‖]

[d̪ɑ waˈt̪an d̪ə ˈʈo.lo koɾ d̪aɪ |]
[d̪ə baˈlo.tso d̪ə ʔʊzˈba.ko ‖]
[d̪ə pəxˈt̪un aʊ ha.zɑˈrɑ.ho |]
[d̪ə t̪ʊɾkˈma.no d̪ə t̪ɑˈdʒɪ.ko ‖]

[waɾ ˈsa.ra ʔaˈrab guˈdʒaɾ d̪i |]
[pɑˌmi.riˈjɑn nuˌrɪ.st̪ɑnˈjɑn ‖]
[b(a.)ɾɑˈha.wi d̪i qɪ.zɪlˈbɑʃ d̪i |]
[həm ʔaɪˈmɑq həm paˌʃa.jiˈjɑn ‖]

[d̪ɑ heˈwɑd̪ ba ˈt̪əl dzaˈle.gi |]
[ˈla.ka lmaɾ pəɾ ʃnə ʔɑsˈmɑn ‖]
[pə ˈsi.ne ke d̪ə ʔɑsˈjɑ ba |]
[ˈla.ka zɽə wi dʒɑ.weˈd̪ɑn ‖]

[num d̪ə haq mo d̪aɪ rah(a)ˈbaɾ |]
[ˈwɑ.ju ʔalˈlɑ.hu ʔakˈbaɾ ‖]
[ˈwɑ.ju ʔalˈlɑ.hu ʔakˈbaɾ |]
[ˈwɑ.ju ʔalˈlɑ.hu ʔakˈbaɾ ‖]

=== Dari translation ===
Persian alphabet

این کشور افغانستان است
این عزت هر افغان است
میهن صلح، جایگاه شمشیر
هر فرزندش قهرمان است

این کشور میهن همه است
از بلوچ‌ها، از ازبک‌ها
پشتون‌ها، هزاره‌ها است
از ترکمن‌ها، از تاجیک‌ها

هم عرب‌ها و گوجرها
پامیريان، نورستانیان
براهویی‌ها و قزلباش‌ها
هم ایماق‌ها، پشه‌ئیان

این کشور همیشه تابان خواهد بود
مثل آفتاب در آسمان کبود
در سینهٔ آسیا
مثل قلب جاویدان

نام حق است ما را رهبر
!می‌گوییم: الله اکبر
!می‌گوییم: الله اکبر
!می‌گوییم: الله اکبر

Latin alphabet

Īn kišwar Afǧānistān ast,
Īn izzat har Afǧān ast.
Xāna-yi sulh, xāna-yi šamšer,
Har farzandaš qahramān ast.

Īn kišwar xāna-yi hama ast,
Az Balūchā, az Uzbakhā;
Paštūnhā, Hazārahā ast,
Az Turkmanhā, Tājikhā.

Ham Arabhā wa Gūjarhā,
Pāmīriyān, Nūristāniyān.
Brāhuwīhā wa Qizilbāšhā,
Ham Aymāqhā wa Pašayiyān.

Īn kišwar hameša tābān xāhad būd,
Misl-i āftāb dar āsmān-i kabūd.
Dar sīna-yi Āsiyā,
Misl-i qalb-i jāwedān.

Nām-i haq ast mārā rahbar,
Megūyem: "Allāhu Akbar!"
Megūyem: "Allāhu Akbar!"
Megūyem: "Allāhu Akbar!"

=== English translation ===
'This is the land of Afghanistan,
'This is the pride of every Afghan.
'This is the land of peace and the sword,
'This is the cradle of its brave sons.

'This is the homeland of every tribe,
Of the Baloch and the Uzbeks;
Of Pashtuns, and of Hazaras;
Of the Turkmens and of Tajiks.

Among them are Arabs, Gurjars,
The Pamirians, Nuristanis;
The Brahuis, the Qizilbash;
Also Aimaqs and Pashayis.

Like the sun in the deep blue sky;
Forever shall this great land shine!
In the chest of Asia it lies;
As the heart shall it remain!

We shall follow the one God:
We all chant, "God is the Greatest!"
We all chant, "God is the Greatest!"
We all chant, "God is the Greatest!"

Translation:

== See also ==
- List of former national anthems
- National anthems of Afghanistan
- Music of Afghanistan
