= Islamic Republic of Afghanistan =

Afghan state from 2004 to 2021

Islamic Republic of Afghanistan: د افغانستان اسلامي جمهوریت (Pashto); Də Afğānistān Islāmi Jumhuriyat; جمهوری اسلامی افغانستان (Dari); Jumhūrī-yi Islāmī-yi Afğānistān
- 2004–2021
- Top: Flag (2004–2013); Bottom: Flag (2013–2021) Top: Emblem (2004–2013); Bottom: Emblem (2013–2021)
- Motto: لا إله إلا الله، محمد رسول الله "Lā ʾilāha ʾillal-Lāh, Muḥammadur rasūl ul-Lāh" "There is no god but God; Muhammad is the messenger of God." (Shahada)
- Anthem: Qal’a-yi Islām, Qalb-i Āsiyā قلعه اسلام قلب آسیا ("Fortress of Islam, Heart of Asia") (2004–2006) Millī Surūd ملی سرود ("National Anthem") (2006–2021)
- Capital and largest city: Kabul; 33°N 66°E
- Official languages: Pashto; Dari
- Ethnic groups: 42% Pashtun; 27% Tajik; 9% Hazara; 9% Uzbek; 4% Aimaq; 3% Turkmen; 2% Baloch; 4% others
- Religion: 99.7% Islam (official); 0.3% others
- Demonym: Afghan (Note: Incorrect names that have been used as demonyms are Afghani and Afghanistani.)
- Government: Unitary presidential Islamic republic
- President
  - 2004–2014: Hamid Karzai
  - 2014–2021: Ashraf Ghani
- Chief Executive
  - 2014–2020: Abdullah Abdullah
- Vice President (Note: Afghanistan had two vice presidential positions, the First Vice President and the Second Vice President.)
  - 2004–2009: Ahmad Zia Massoud
  - 2004–2014: Karim Khalili
  - 2009–2014: Mohammed Fahim
  - 2014 (Note: 31 March to 29 September): Yunus Qanuni
  - 2014–2020: Abdul Rashid Dostum
  - 2014–2021: Sarwar Danish
  - 2020–2021: Amrullah Saleh
- Legislature: National Assembly
  - Upper house: House of Elders
  - Lower house: House of the People
- Historical era: War on terror, war in Afghanistan
  - U.S. invasion of Afghanistan: 7 October 2001
  - First elections: 9 October 2004
  - U.S. withdrawal begins: 22 June 2011
  - Taliban takeover: 15 August 2021

Area
  - Water (%): Negligible
- 2020: 652,864 km^{2} (252,072 sq mi)

Population
  - 2020: 31,390,200
  - Density: 48.08/km^{2} (124.5/sq mi)
- GDP (PPP): 2021 estimate
  - Total: $83 billion
- HDI (2019): 0.511 low
- Currency: Afghan afghani (Note: Pashto: افغانۍ, romanized: Afğānəi; Dari: افغانی, romanized: Afğānī) (AFN)
- Time zone: UTC+4:30 Solar Calendar (D†)
- Calling code: +93
- Internet TLD: .af
Preceded by	Succeeded by
Transitional Islamic State of Afghanistan	Islamic Emirate of Afghanistan

The Islamic Republic of Afghanistan (Note: Pashto: د افغانستان اسلامي جمهوریت; Dari: جمهوری اسلامی افغانستان) was a unitary presidential republic in Afghanistan from 2004 to 2021. The state was established to replace the Afghan interim (2001–2002) and transitional (2002–2004) administrations, which were formed after the 2001 United States invasion of Afghanistan that had toppled the partially recognized Taliban-ruled Islamic Emirate of Afghanistan. However, on 15 August 2021, the country was recaptured by the Taliban, which marked the end of the 2001–2021 war, the longest war in US history. This led to the overthrow of the Islamic Republic, led by President Ashraf Ghani, and the reinstatement of the Islamic Emirate under the control of the Taliban, today the ruling government of Afghanistan. While most countries continue to consider the Islamic Republic to be the legitimate government of Afghanistan, it no longer exists, with neither any in-country operations nor government in exile operations. The United Nations determined in 2022 that the Islamic Republic had ceased to exist on 15 August 2021, and that neither it nor any of its officials, including Ghani, remained legitimate representatives of Afghanistan. The caretaker representative of Afghanistan to the UN, Naseer Faiq, has since renounced the Islamic Republic, instead portraying himself as an independent representative of Afghanistan. The UN has not recognized the Taliban or any other entity as the new representative of Afghanistan.

The US–Taliban deal, signed on 29 February 2020 in Qatar, was one of the critical events that caused the collapse of the Afghan National Security Forces (ANSF). Following the deal, the US dramatically reduced the number of air attacks and deprived the ANSF of a critical edge in fighting the Taliban insurgency, leading to the Taliban takeover of Kabul.

Following the September 11 attacks, the United States and several allies invaded Afghanistan, overthrowing the Taliban's first government (which had limited recognition) in support of the opposition Northern Alliance. Afterwards, a transitional government was formed under the leadership of Hamid Karzai. After the 2003 loya jirga, a unitary presidential Islamic republic was proclaimed under a new constitution, and Karzai was elected for a full term as president. Meanwhile, the US-led international coalition helped maintain internal security, gradually transferring the burden of defense to the Afghan Armed Forces after 2013–14.

However, Taliban forces held control of various areas of the country and the civil war continued. The Taliban regrouped as an insurgency with the alleged support of Pakistan, and escalated attacks on Afghan and coalition forces after 2006–07. This perpetuated Afghanistan's problematic human rights and women's rights records, with numerous abuses committed by both sides, such as the killing of civilians, kidnapping, and torture. Due to the government's extensive reliance on American military and economic aid, some classed the nation as an American client state, and it gradually lost control of the rural countryside after the conclusion of Operation Enduring Freedom.

During the withdrawal of NATO troops in 2021, the Taliban launched a massive military offensive in May 2021, allowing them to take control of the country over the following three and a half months. The Afghan National Army rapidly disintegrated. The institutions of the republic collapsed on 15 August 2021, when the Taliban forces entered Kabul and Afghan president Ashraf Ghani fled the country.

== History ==
In December 2001, after the Taliban government was overthrown, the Afghan Interim Administration under Hamid Karzai was formed. The International Security Assistance Force (ISAF) was established by the UN Security Council to help assist the Karzai administration and provide basic security. By this time, after two decades of war as well as an acute famine at the time, Afghanistan had one of the highest infant and child mortality rates in the world, the lowest life expectancy, widespread hunger, and significantly damaged infrastructure. Many foreign donors started providing aid and assistance to rebuild the war-torn country.

Taliban forces meanwhile began regrouping inside Pakistan, while more coalition troops entered Afghanistan to help the rebuilding process. The Taliban began an insurgency to regain control of Afghanistan. Over the next decade, ISAF and Afghan troops led many offensives against the Taliban, but failed to fully defeat them. Afghanistan remained one of the poorest countries in the world because of reliance on subsistence agriculture, a lack of foreign investment, government corruption, and the Taliban insurgency. Meanwhile, Karzai attempted to unite the peoples of the country, and the Afghan government was able to build some democratic structures, adopting a constitution in 2004 with the name Islamic Republic of Afghanistan. Attempts were made, often with the support of foreign donor countries, to improve the country's economy, healthcare, education, transport, and agriculture in Reconstruction in Afghanistan. ISAF forces also began to train the Afghan National Security Forces. Following 2002, nearly five million Afghans were repatriated. The number of NATO troops present in Afghanistan peaked at 140,000 in 2011, dropping to about 16,000 in 2018.

In September 2014, Ashraf Ghani became president after the 2014 presidential election where for the first time in Afghanistan's history power was democratically transferred. On 28 December 2014, NATO formally ended ISAF combat operations in Afghanistan and transferred full security responsibility to the Afghan government. The NATO-led Operation Resolute Support was formed the same day as a successor to ISAF. Thousands of NATO troops remained in the country to train and advise Afghan government forces and continue their fight against the Taliban. It was estimated in 2015 that "about 147,000 people have been killed in the Afghanistan war since 2001. More than 38,000 of those killed have been civilians." A report titled Body Count concluded that 106,000–170,000 civilians have been killed as a result of the fighting in Afghanistan at the hands of all parties to the conflict.

=== Collapse ===
==== 2021 Taliban resurgence ====
On 14 April 2021, NATO Secretary General Jens Stoltenberg said the alliance had agreed to start withdrawing its troops from Afghanistan by 1 May. Soon after the withdrawal of NATO troops started, the Taliban launched an offensive against the Afghan government, quickly advancing in front of collapsing Afghan government forces. In June 2021, a US intelligence report predicted that the Afghan government would likely collapse within six months after NATO completed its withdrawal from the country. The report proved overly optimistic: by the second week of August, most Afghan provincial capitals had fallen into the hands of the Taliban and the Afghan National Army was in complete disarray, losing ground on all fronts. The falls of Mazar-i-Sharif and Jalalabad on 14 and 15 August respectively removed any possibility for the Afghan government to halt Taliban advance.

==== Fall of Kabul ====
On 15 August 2021, Taliban forces entered the capital city of Kabul, meeting only limited resistance. In the afternoon, it was reported that Afghan President Ashraf Ghani had left the country, fleeing into either Tajikistan or Uzbekistan; Chairman of the House of the People Mir Rahman Rahmani was also reported to have fled into Pakistan. Following Ghani's escape, the remaining loyalist forces abandoned their posts and the Afghan Armed Forces de facto ceased to exist.

On the evening of 15 August, the Taliban occupied the Arg, lowered the Afghan republican flag and raised their own flag over the palace. On 19 August 2021 the Taliban proclaimed the restoration of the Islamic Emirate of Afghanistan.

On 17 August 2021, Gulbuddin Hekmatyar, the leader of Hezb-e-Islami, met with both Hamid Karzai, former President of Afghanistan, and Abdullah Abdullah, Chairman of the High Council for National Reconciliation and former Chief Executive, in Doha, seeking to form a government. President Ghani, having settled in the United Arab Emirates, said that he supported such negotiations. On 17 August, the former First Vice President of the Islamic Republic of Afghanistan, Amrullah Saleh, tweeted that he had remained in the country and had assumed the role of Caretaker President in the absence of Ghani citing the Afghan Constitution as his basis. Saleh later fled to Tajikistan.

=== Republican insurgency ===
==== National Resistance Front ====
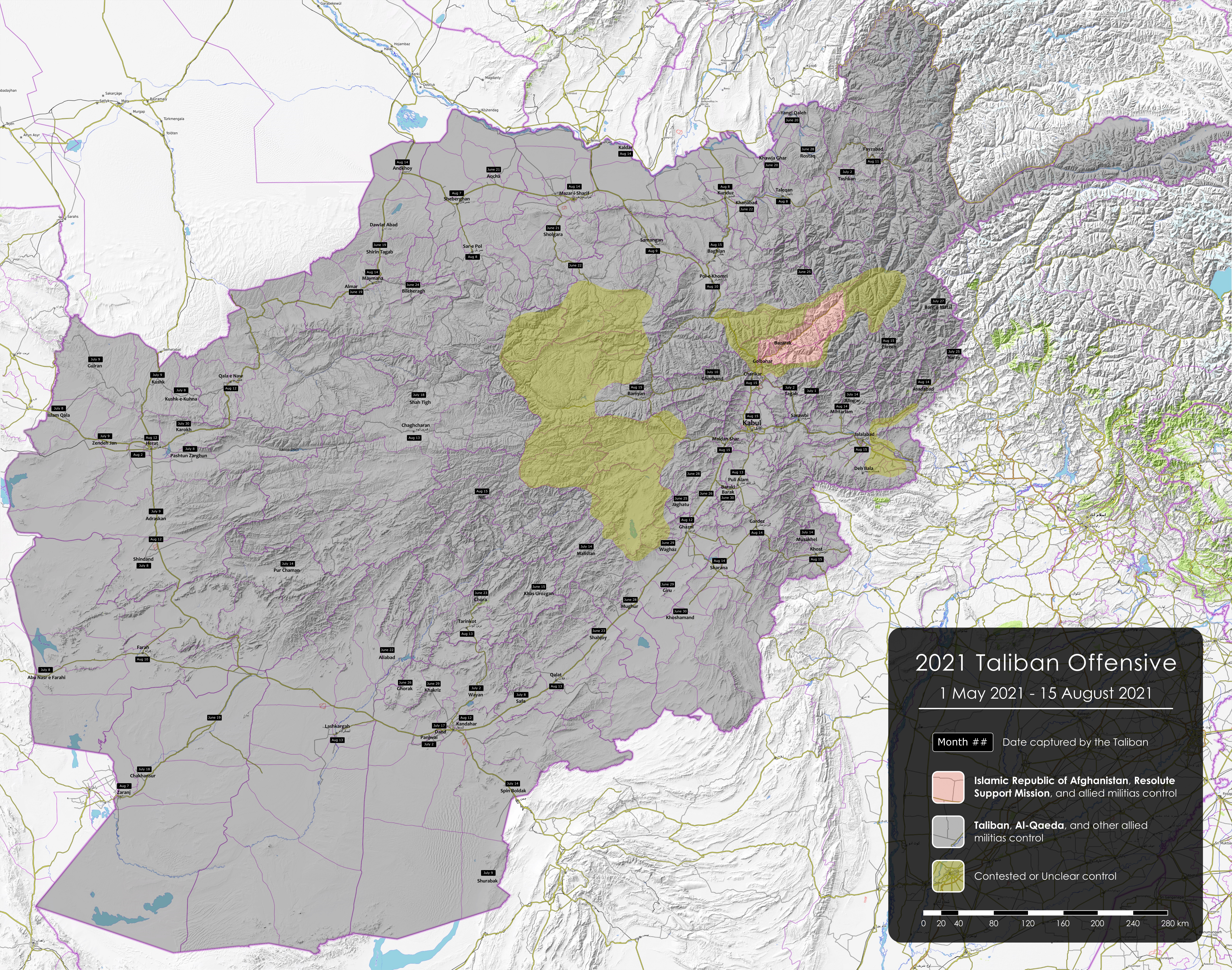
Effective control of territory in Afghanistan by 15 August 2021

In July 2021, during the Taliban offensive, the remnants of the Northern Alliance began mobilizing under an umbrella called Resistance II. The forces later became the National Resistance Front led by Ahmad Shah Massoud's son Ahmad Massoud and was based in the Panjshir Valley, using the city of Bazarak as a temporary capital, as it was one of the few areas of Afghanistan that was still under control of the Islamic Republic. On 6 September, after heavy fighting resulting in high losses on both sides, the Taliban claimed to have captured all of Panjshir, with the Taliban flag being hoisted at the governor's office in Bazarak. The remaining NRF troops had reportedly retreated into the mountains, while Saleh and Massoud fled to Tajikistan.

==== Additional resistance ====
As of 2022, scattered fighting between opposition groups and the Taliban continue to occur. On 13 March 2022, the Afghanistan Freedom Front (AFF), an ethnically diverse anti-Taliban military group formed, and has since conducted several attacks on the Taliban, including a missile attack on Bagram Airfield, in which six Taliban soldiers were killed and two were wounded.

In June 2022, an uprising began in the Balkhab District of the Sar-e Pol Province. Hazara rebel Mehdi Mujahid, the Taliban-appointed head of intelligence of the Bamyan Province had been expelled from the position after criticizing the closure of girls' schools and continued demanding for equality to Hazaras and other Shia Muslims. He left the Taliban, declaring war on them, and began to gather rebels. Supported by the NRF and several political parties, the rebels seized Balkhab and controlled the entire district by 13 June 2022. On 23 June 2022, the Taliban began fighting to take back the district. The uprising ended when the Taliban recaptured Balkhab and Mujahid was killed.

On the one year anniversary of the fall of Kabul, the NRF conducted various hit-and-run attacks on Taliban militants. Several other minor groups, such as the Ahmad Khan Samangani Front and the Afghanistan Islamic National and Liberation Movement have also conducted attacks against the Taliban.

== Governance ==
The Islamic Republic of Afghanistan was a unitary Islamic republic with its government consisting of three branches, the executive, legislative, and judicial. The head of state and government was the President of Afghanistan. The National Assembly was the legislature, a bicameral body having two chambers, the House of the People and the House of Elders. The Supreme Court was led by Chief Justice Said Yusuf Halem, the former Deputy Minister of Justice for Legal Affairs.

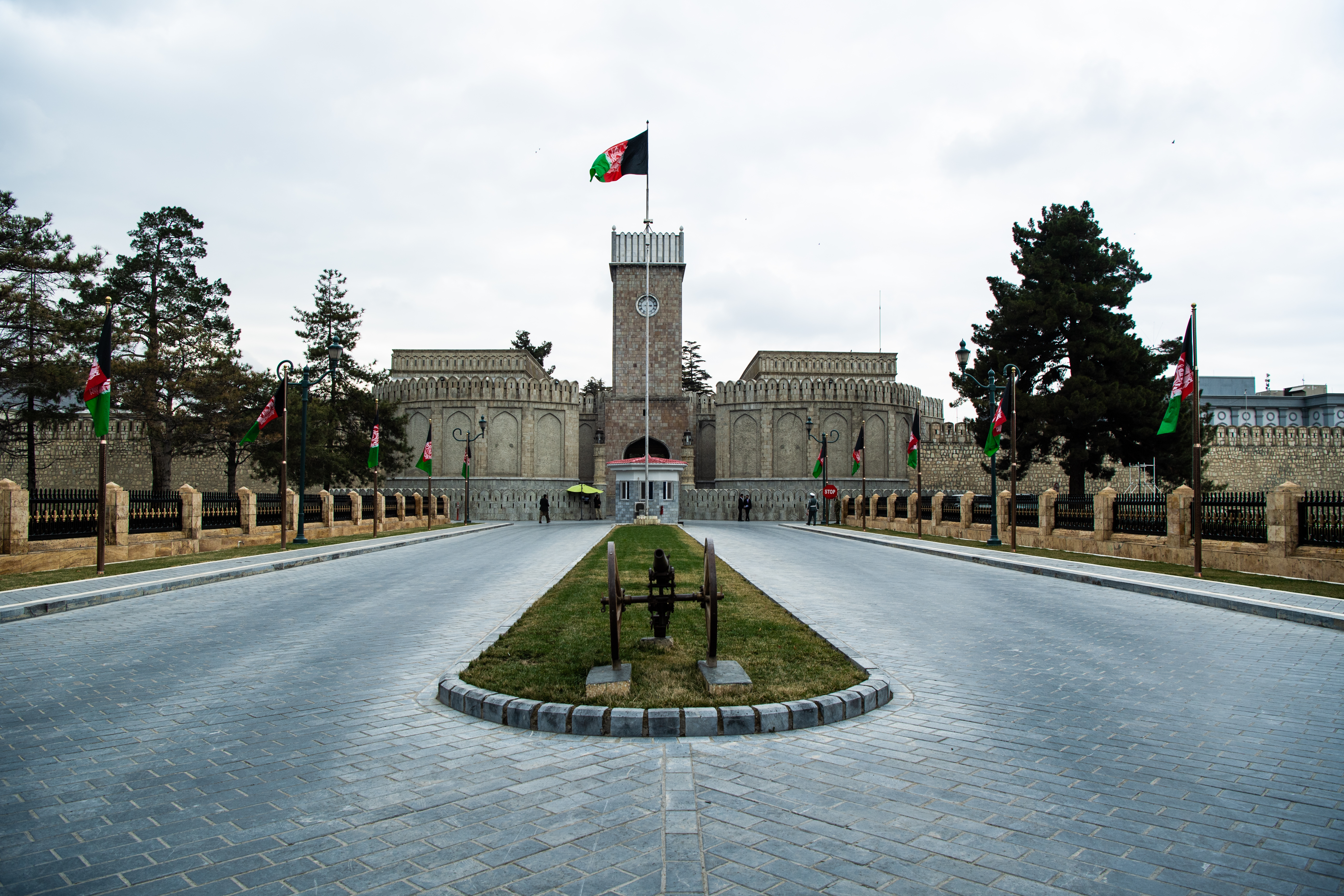
The Arg (the presidential palace) in Kabul

According to Transparency International, Afghanistan remained one of the most corrupt countries. A January 2010 report published by the United Nations Office on Drugs and Crime revealed that bribery consumed an amount equal to 23% of the GDP of the nation. Corruption was endemic even in the upper echelons of governance: in August 2010 it was revealed that the leadership of the New Kabul Bank and a handful of political elites, including cabinet ministers, had embezzled close to $1 billion through fraudulent loan schemes.

On 17 May 2020, President Ashraf Ghani reached a power-sharing deal with his rival from presidential elections, Abdullah Abdullah, about who would manage the respected key ministries. The agreement ended months-long political deadlock in the country. It was agreed that while Ghani will lead Afghanistan as the president, Abdullah would oversee the peace process with the Taliban.

Reports emerged on 25 August that a 12-member council will be formed to govern Afghanistan. Reportedly 7 members were already agreed upon: Hekmatyar, Karzai, Abdullah, Abdul Ghani Baradar, Mohammad Yaqoob, Khalil-ur-Rehman Haqqani, and Hanif Atmar.

The National Directorate of Security (NDS) was the state intelligence and security service. The NDS reported directly to the Office of President.

=== Elections and parties ===
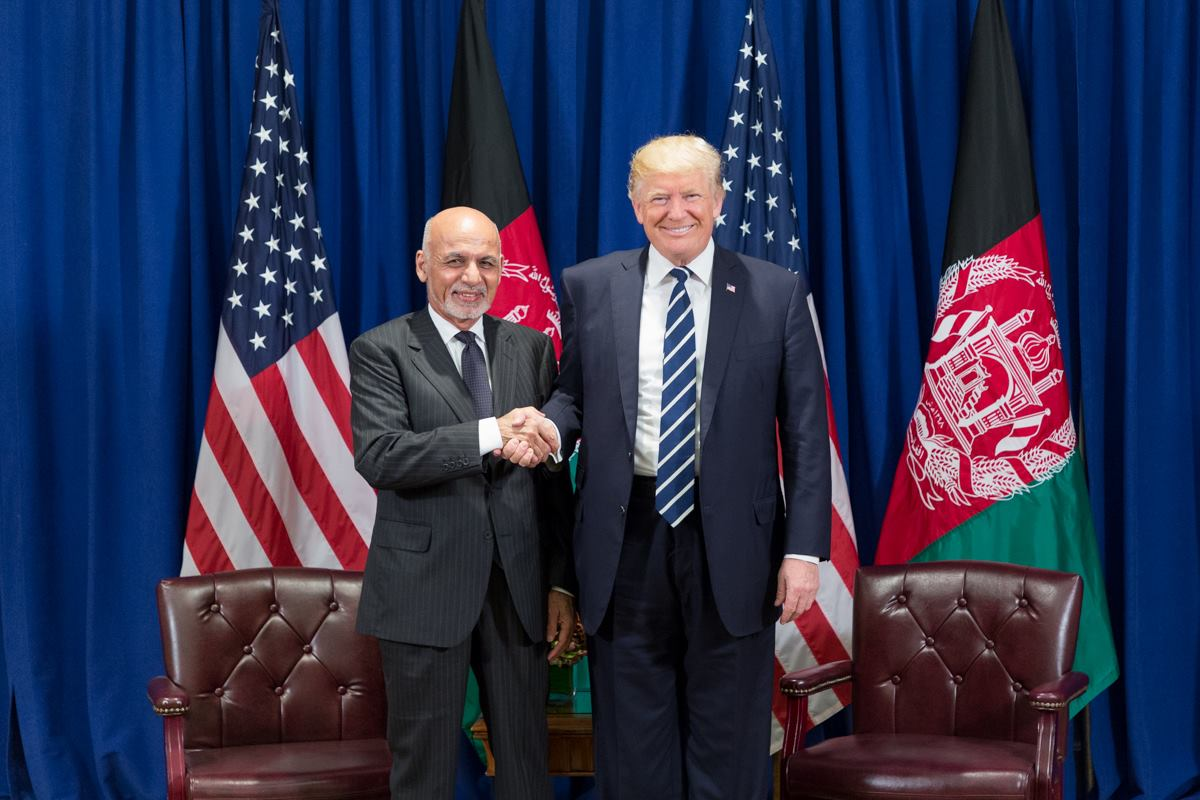
US President Donald Trump with Afghan President Ashraf Ghani in 2017

Under the 2004 constitution, both presidential and parliamentary elections were to be held every five years. However, due to the disputed 2014 presidential election, the scheduled 2015 parliamentary elections were delayed until 2018. Presidential elections used the two-round system; if no candidate received a majority of the vote in the first round, a second round would be held featuring the top two candidates. Parliamentary elections had only one round and were based on the single non-transferable vote system, which allows some candidates to be elected with as little as one percent of the vote.

The 2004 Afghan presidential election was relatively peaceful, in which Hamid Karzai won in the first round with 55.4% of the votes. However, the 2009 presidential election was characterized by lack of security, low voter turnout, and widespread electoral fraud, ending in Karzai's reelection. The 2014 presidential election ended with Ashraf Ghani winning with 56.44% of the votes.

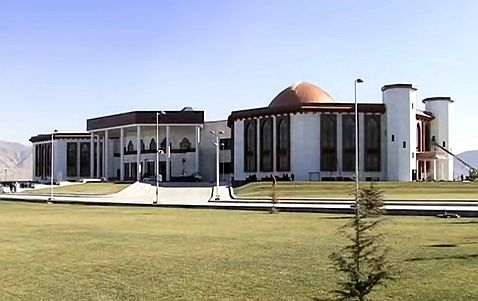
The National Assembly of Afghanistan in Kabul. The current site was built in 2015.

Political parties played a marginal role in post-2001 Afghan politics, in part due to Karzai's opposition to them. In the 2005 parliamentary election, the ballots did not show candidates' party affiliation, so the results were dictated by the personal prestige of the candidates. Among the elected officials were a large mix of former mujahideen, Islamic fundamentalists, warlords, tribal nationalists, former communists, reformists, urban professionals, royalists and several former Taliban associates. In the same period, Afghanistan became the 30th highest nation in terms of female representation in the National Assembly. Parties became more influential after 2009, when a new law established more stringent requirements for party registration. Nearly a hundred new parties were registered after the law came into effect, and party activity increased in the 2014 elections, but party influence remained limited.

=== Military ===
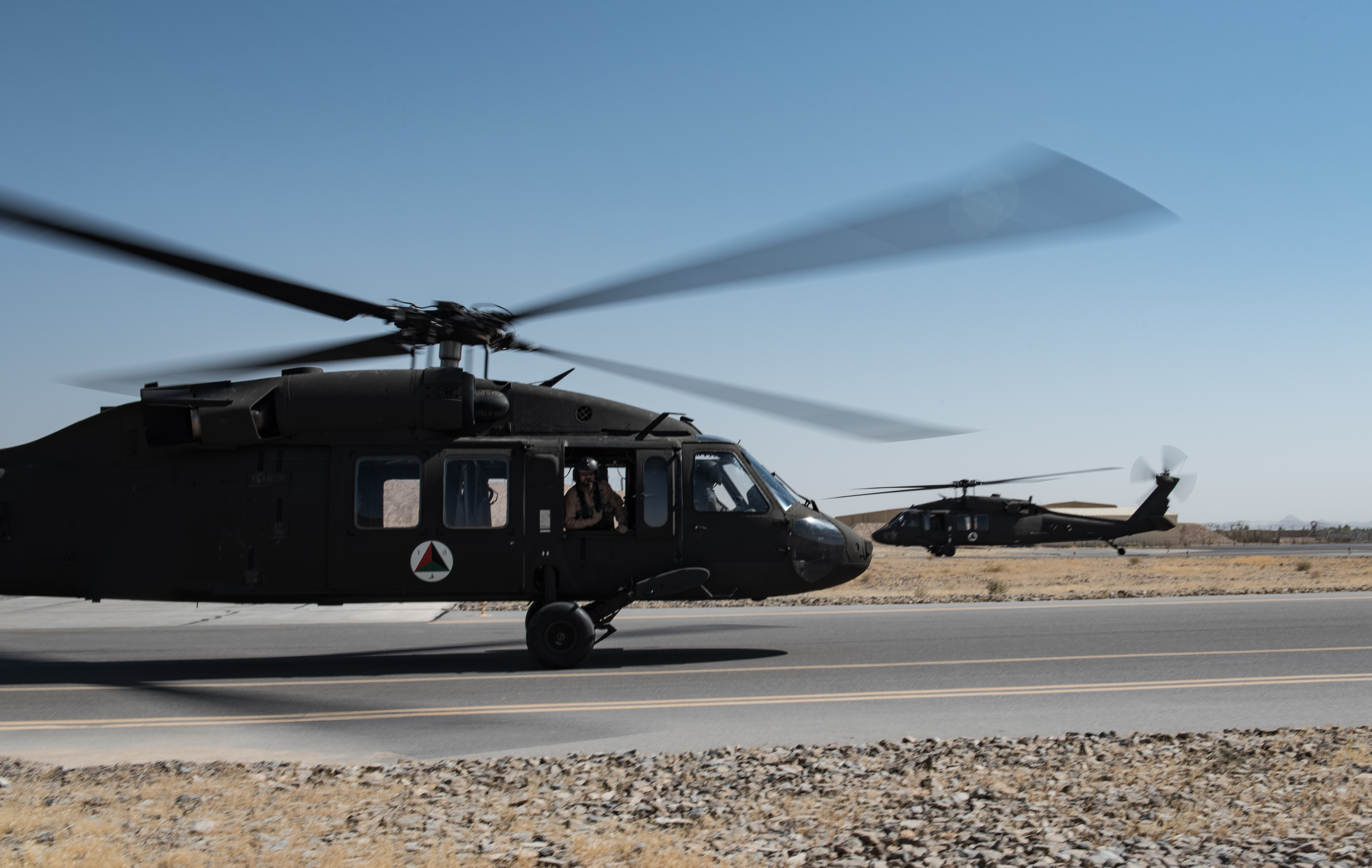
Black Hawks of the Afghan Air Force at Kandahar Airfield

Before the fall of Kabul, the Afghan National Army (ANA) was under the Ministry of Defense, which included the Afghan Air Force (AAF). The Afghan Defense University housed various educational establishments for the Afghan National Army, including the National Military Academy of Afghanistan.

The United States Department of Defense used the exonym "Afghan National Security Forces" (ANSF) to describe the Armed Forces and Police together. As of 30 June 2020, the ANSF or Afghan National Defence and Security Forces (ANDSF) were composed of the Afghan National Army, including its Air Force; Afghan National Police (including Afghan Local Police), and the National Directorate of Security (including the Afghan Special Force).

In December 2020, the U.S. Department of Defense wrote that the ANA General Staff commanded and controlled all of Afghanistan's ground and air forces, including "the ANA conventional forces, the Afghan Air Force (AAF), the Special Mission Wing (SMW), the ANA Special Operations Command (ANASOC), the Afghan National Civil Order Force (ANCOF), and the Afghan Border Force (ABF). In total, the ANA consisted of 27 combat brigades, three combat air wings, four branch and basic training schools, seven ANCOF brigades, seven ABF brigades, and additional support facilities such as depots and hospitals."

NATO special operations forces trained, advised and assisted the ANASOC, SMW and General Command of Police Special Units (GCPSU) who were collectively known as the Afghan Special Security Forces (ASSF). The ASSF was described as the "ANDSF’s primary offensive forces".

=== Law enforcement ===
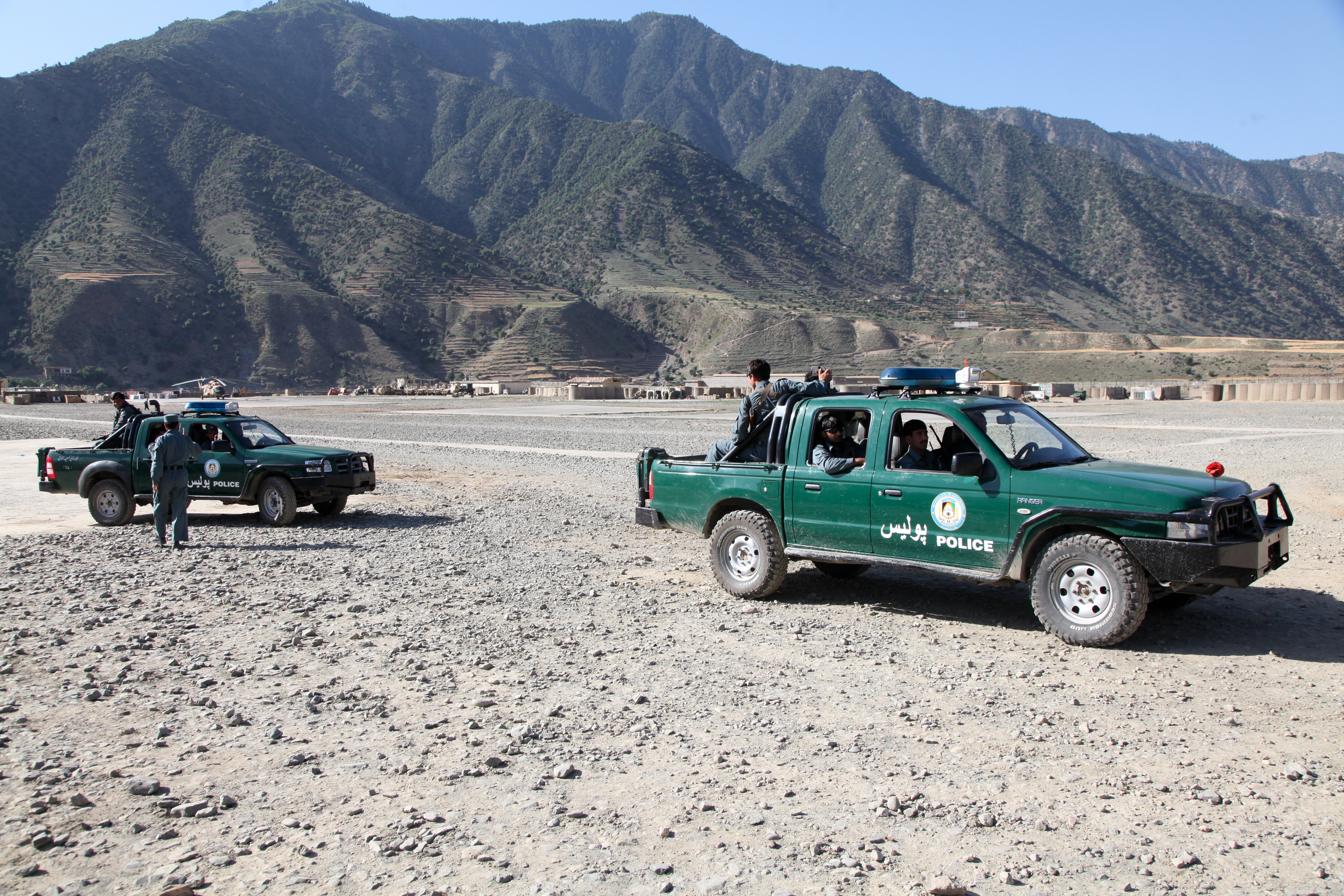
Afghan National Police (ANP) in Kunar Province

Law enforcement was the responsibility of the Afghan National Police (ANP), which was part of the Ministry of Interior Affairs. The ANP consisted of two primary branches, the Afghan Uniformed Police and the Afghan Border Police. The mission of the Uniformed Police was to ensure security within Afghanistan, prevent crime, and protect property. The Border Police was responsible for securing and maintaining the nation's borders with neighboring states as well as all international airports within the country. Afghanistan's intelligence agency, the National Directorate of Security (NDS), assisted the ANP with security matters. Despite that, all parts of Afghanistan were considered dangerous due to militant activities and terrorism-related incidents. Kidnapping for ransom and robberies were common in major cities. Every year hundreds of Afghan police were killed in the line of duty. Afghanistan was also the world's leading producer of opium. Afghanistan's opium poppy harvest produces more than 90% of illicit heroin globally, and more than 95% of the European supply. The Afghan Ministry of Counter Narcotics was responsible for the monitoring and eradication of the illegal drug business.

Ministry of Interior Affairs components included:

- Afghan National Police (ANP)
  - Afghan Uniformed Police (AUP)
  - Public Security Police (PSP)
  - Afghan Border Police (ABP)
  - General Directorate for Intelligence and Counter Crime (GDICC) (formerly Afghan Anti-Crime Police (AACP))
  - Afghan Public Protection Force (APPF)
  - Counter Narcotics Police of Afghanistan (CNPA)
  - Afghan Local Police (ALP)
  - General Command of Police Special Units (GCPSU)
    - Afghan Territorial Force (ATF) 444
    - Crisis Response Unit (CRU) 222
    - Commando Force (CF) 333 (formerly Afghan Special Narcotics Force)

=== Foreign relations ===
Afghanistan became a member of the United Nations in 1946. Under the Islamic Republic of Afghanistan, it enjoyed cordial relations with a number of NATO and allied nations, particularly the United States, Canada, United Kingdom, Germany, Australia, and Turkey. In 2012, the United States and Afghanistan signed their Strategic Partnership Agreement in which Afghanistan became a major non-NATO ally. Relations with Pakistan were often tense for various reasons such as the Durand Line border issue and alleged Pakistani involvement in Afghan insurgent groups. Afghanistan also had diplomatic relations with neighboring China, Iran, Tajikistan, Turkmenistan, and Uzbekistan, as well as with regional states such as Bangladesh, Japan, Kazakhstan, Nepal, Russia, South Korea, and the UAE.

The United Nations Assistance Mission in Afghanistan (UNAMA) was established in 2002 to help the country recover from decades of war. Until summer 2021, several NATO member states deployed about 17,000 troops in Afghanistan as part of the Resolute Support Mission. Its main purpose was to train the Afghan National Security Forces.

On 1 December 2021, the nine-nation Credentials Committee of the General Assembly voted to defer a decision to allow the Taliban to represent Afghanistan at the UN. However, on 15 February 2022, the UN released an updated list of member state officials with the names of Ghani administration officials removed.

=== Human rights ===
Freedom of expression and the press were permitted and promoted in the 2004 constitution, so long as it did not threaten national or religious integrity or did not defame individuals. In 2019, Reporters Without Borders listed the media environment of Afghanistan as 121st out of 179 on its Press Freedom Index, with 1st being most free. However many issues regarding human rights existed contrary to the law, often committed by local tribes, lawmakers and hardline clerics. Journalists in Afghanistan faced threat from both the security forces and insurgents. The Afghan Journalists Safety Committee (AJSC) claimed in 2017 that the Afghan government accounted for 46% of the attacks on Afghan journalists, while insurgents were responsible for rest of the attacks.

According to Global Rights, almost 90% of women in Afghanistan had experienced physical abuse, sexual abuse, psychological abuse or forced marriage. In the majority of cases, the perpetrators of these crimes were the families of the victim, and a 2009 proposal for a law against the violence of women could eventually only be passed through a presidential decree. In 2012, Afghanistan recorded 240 cases of honor killings, but the total number were believed to be much higher. Of the reported honor killings, 21% were committed by the victims' husbands, 7% by their brothers, 4% by their fathers, and the rest by other relatives.

Homosexuality was taboo in Afghan society; according to the Penal Code, homosexual intimacy was punished by up to a year in prison. With the implementation of Sharia law, offenders could be punished by death; however, an ancient tradition involving male homosexual acts between youngsters and older men (typically wealthy or elite people) called bacha bazi persisted. Despite being illegal, the people engaging in the act were often not punished.

Ethnic and religious minorities such as Hazaras, Sikhs, Hindus, and Christians reportedly faced persecution in the country.

On 14 August 2020, UN Human Rights Council experts issued a joint statement urging Afghanistan officials to prevent the killings of human rights defenders as there had been nine deaths of human rights defenders since January 2020.

== Infrastructure ==
In spite of the turbulent political situation and military conflict which defined the years of the republic, an expansion in access to certain utilities and services also took place during this era.

=== Health and education ===
Between 2001 and 2021, Afghanistan experienced improvements in health, education and women's rights. Life expectancy increased from 56 to 64 years and the maternal mortality rate was reduced by half. 89% of residents living in cities have access to clean water, up from 16% in 2001. The rate of child marriage has been reduced by 17%. The population of Afghanistan increased by more than 50% between 2001 and 2014, while its GDP grew eightfold.

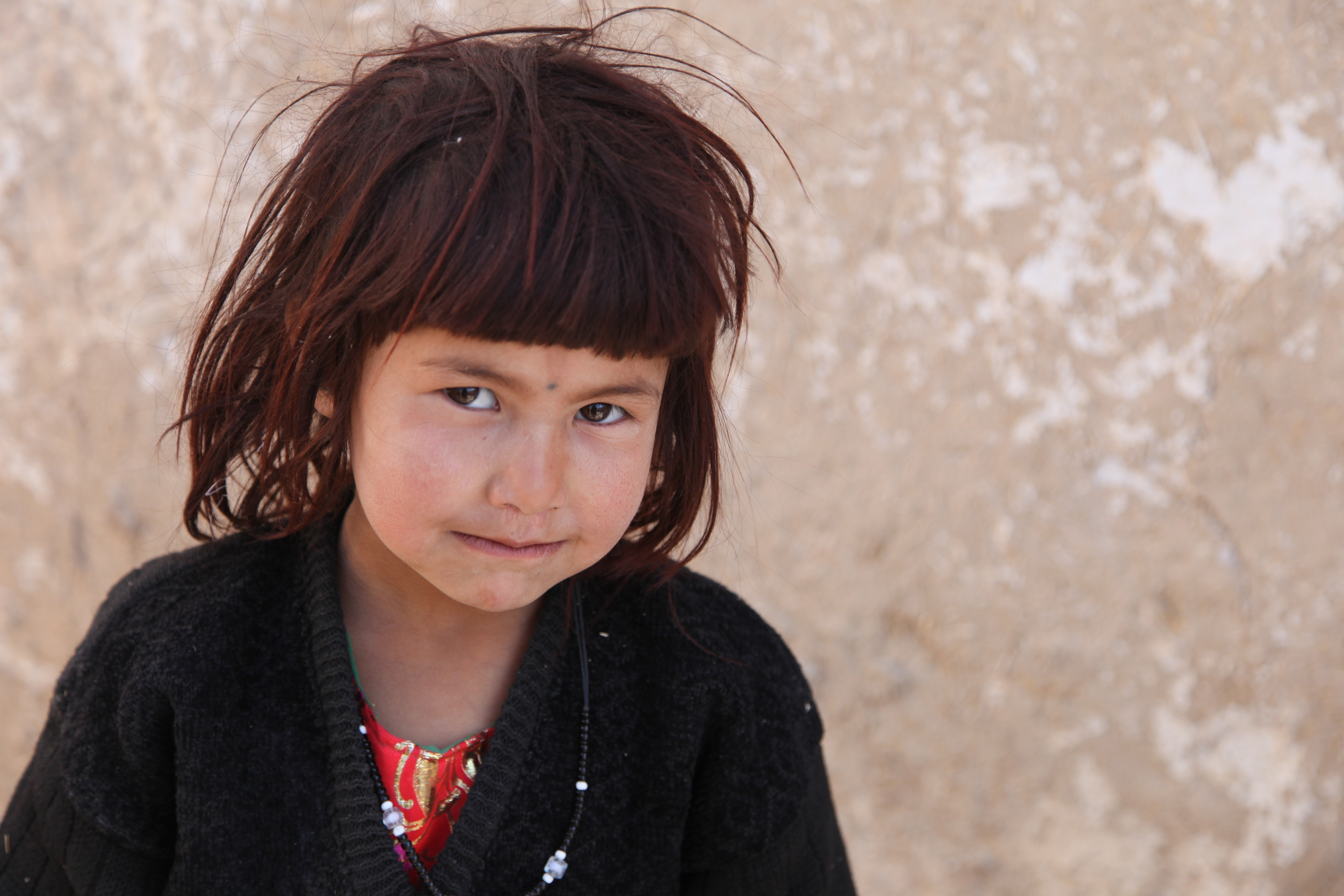
A young Afghan girl in Qalat pictured by the 116th Infantry Battalion before receiving school supplies in 2011

As of 2013, 8.2 million Afghans attended school, up from 1.2 million in 2001. 3.2 million girls attended school in 2013, up from fewer than 50,000 in 2001. 39% of girls were attending school in 2017 compared to 6% in 2003. In 2021, a third of students at university were women and 27% of members of parliament were women. The literacy rate in 2021 has risen from 8% to 43% since 2001. In 2018, UNICEF reported that 3.7 million children between the ages of 7 and 17, or 44 percent, were not attending school.

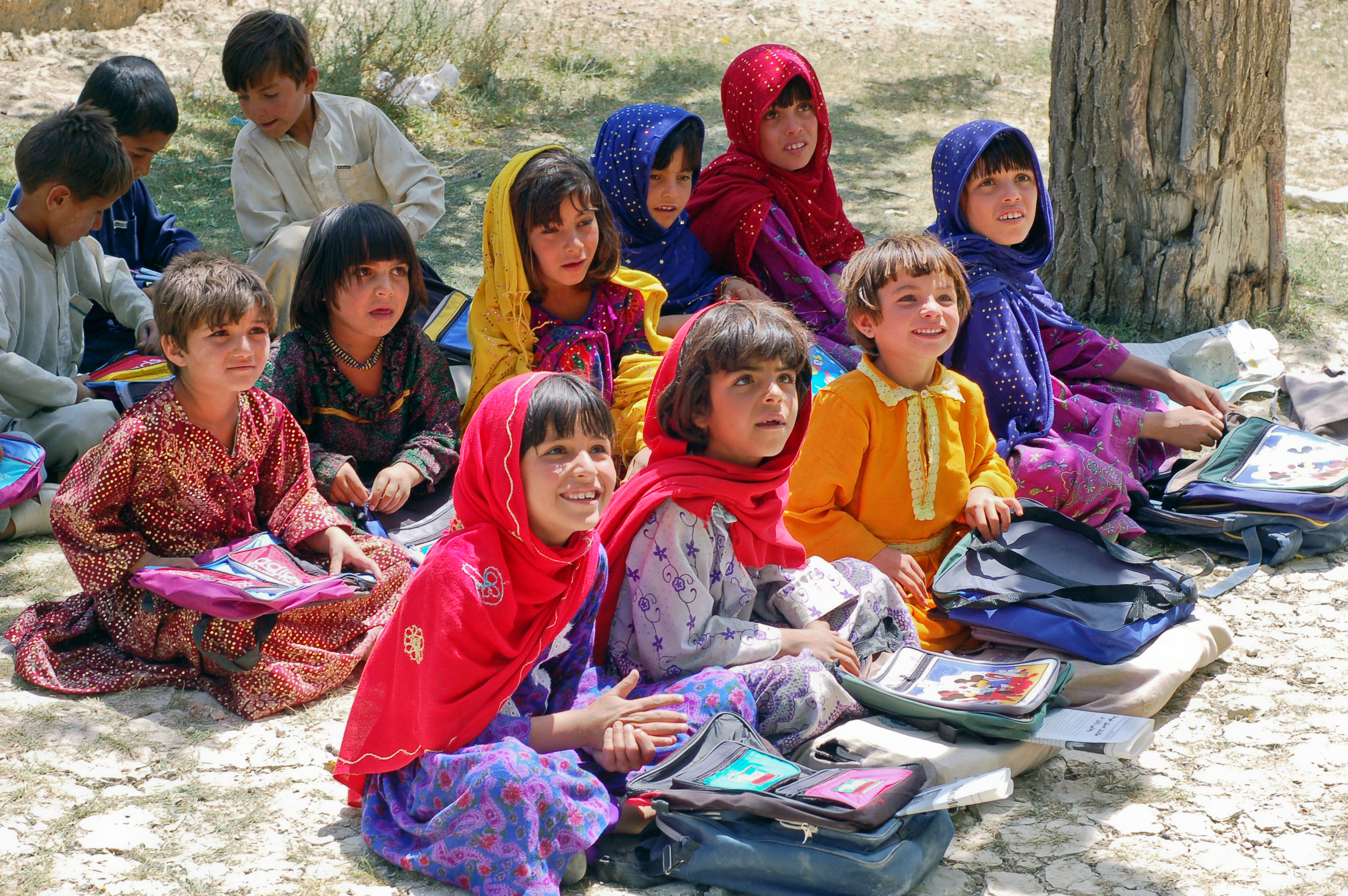
School children in Ghazni Province (2007) – the number of children attending school at primary level increased from 5% in 2000 to 57% in 2018.

In 2020, there were over 16,000 schools in the country and roughly 9.5 million students. Of this, about 60% were males and 40% females. This was an increase from 900,000 exclusively male students in 2001. Over 174,000 students were enrolled in different universities around the country. About 21% of these were females. However, former Education Minister Ghulam Farooq Wardak had stated in 2013 that the construction of 8,000 schools was still required for the remaining children who were deprived of formal learning.

As of 2018 the literacy rate of the population age 15 and older was 43.02% (males 55.48% and females 29.81%). The Afghan National Security Forces received mandatory literacy courses as part of their training.

=== Technology ===
According to the World Bank, 98% of the rural population had access to electricity by 2018, up from 28% in 2008. Overall the figure stood at 98.7%. As of 2016, Afghanistan produced 1,400 megawatts of power, but still imported the majority of the electricity it consumed via transmission lines from Iran and the Central Asian states.

In 2001 following years of civil war, telecommunications was virtually a non-existent sector, but by 2016 it had grown to a $2 billion industry, with 22 million mobile phone subscribers and 5 million internet users. The sector employed at least 120,000 people nationwide.

== Culture ==
Press restrictions were gradually relaxed and private media diversified after 2002, following more than two decades of tight controls. The Afghan media experienced rapid growth during the Karzai administration, with dozens of TV stations being established around the country. Afghanistan had 203 television stations, 284 radio stations and nearly 1,500 print media outlets in 2019.

The Afghan music scene re-emerged after the removal of the Taliban, with singing competition series such as Afghan Star and The Voice of Afghanistan becoming popular, with contestants performing songs, including those formerly banned.

== See also ==
- Outline of Afghanistan
- Puppet state – State controlled by an external power

== Bibliography ==
- Barfield, Thomas (2012). Afghanistan: A Cultural and Political History. Princeton University Press. ISBN 978-0-691-15441-1.
- Dupree, Louis (1997). Afghanistan (2nd ed.). Oxford Pakistan Paperbacks. ISBN 978-0-19-577634-8.
- European Asylum Support Office (August 2020). Afghanistan - State Structure and Security Forces - Country of Origin Information Report. Publications Office of the European Union. ISBN 9789294856500. Archived from the original on 7 November 2020.
- Helmus, Todd C. (2015). Advising the Command : Best Practices from the Special Operation's Advisory Experience in Afghanistan (PDF). Santa Monica, CA: RAND Corporation. ISBN 9780833088918.
- Special Inspector General for Afghanistan Reconstruction (June 2022). Police in conflict: lessons from the U.S. experience in Afghanistan (PDF) (Report). Arlington, Va. OCLC 1408444974. Archived from the original (PDF) on 7 February 2024.
- Special Inspector General for Afghanistan Reconstruction (30 July 2021). Quarterly report to the United States Congress (PDF) (Report). Arlington, Va. Archived from the original (PDF) on 13 August 2021.
- United States. Department of Defense (December 2020b). Enhancing Security and Stability in Afghanistan (PDF) (Report). 7-653B15D.

Preceded by Transitional Islamic State of Afghanistan	Islamic Republic of Afghanistan; 2004–2021	Succeeded by Islamic Emirate of Afghanistan
