= National symbols of Afghanistan =

The official and de facto national symbols of Afghanistan are as follows:

Title	Symbol	Image	Notes
National flag	Flag of Afghanistan		The flag of Afghanistan under the current Taliban regime consists of Shahada in black on a white field.
National emblem	Emblem of Afghanistan		The emblem of Afghanistan has a mihrab with a minbar within, supporting the Quran, and crowned by the sun.Two swords, two sheaves of wheat and a cogwheel.Inscription of the shahada in Arabic and name of the nation in Pashto: لا إله إلا الله محمد رسول الله - ١٤١٥,١,١٥هـ ت - د افغانستان اسلامي امارت "There is no god but Allah. Muhammad is the messenger of Allah - 15-1-1415A.H.Q[b] - Islamic Emirate of Afghanistan"
National anthem	"This Is the Home of the Brave"		The "Afghan National Anthem" (Pashto: دا د باتورانو کور - "Dā Də Bātorāno Kor"; Dari: اینجا خانه شجاعان است - "Īnjā Xāna-yi Šujā'ān ast") was adopted and officially announced by a Loya Jirga in May 2006. According to article 20 of the Afghan Constitution, the national anthem shall be in Pashto with the mention of "God is Greatest" as well as the names of the various tribes of Afghanistan. The lyrics were written by Abdul Bari Jahani and the music was written by German-Afghan composer Babrak Wassa.
National motto	Shahada		لا إله إلا الله، محمد رسول الله (Lā ʾilāha ʾillāl–lāh, Muhammadun rasūl allāh); There is no god but Allah; Muhammad is the messenger of God. (the shahada)
Father of the Nation	Ahmad Shah Durrani		
National animal	Snow leopard		The snow leopard (Panthera uncia) is a species of big cat native to mountainous regions of Afghanistan, Bhutan, China, India, Kazakhstan, Kyrgyzstan, Nepal, Mongolia, Russia, Tajikistan and Uzbekistan.
National bird	Golden eagle		The golden eagle (Aquila chrysaetos) is one of best known birds of prey and most widely distributed species of eagle. It is dark brown, with lighter golden-brown plumage on its nape.
National dog	Afghan Hound		Its local names are Tāžī Spay (Pashto) or Sag-e Tāzī (Dari Persian).
National flower	Tulip		The tulip (Tulipa gesneriana L.) is a Eurasian and North African genus of perennial, bulbous plants in the lily family.
National tree	Afghan pine		
National fruit	Pomegranate		Pomegranate production in Afghanistan is a significant contributor to the Afghan agricultural economy. Pomegranates are a major fruit crop in many provinces such as Kandahar, Helmand, Wardak, Ghazni, Paktia, Farah, Kapisa and Balkh, and are the source of the livelihoods of thousands of people.
National sport	Buzkashi		
National dance	Attan		
National instrument	Rubab		
National poet	Khushal Khan Khattak (Pashto), Rumi (Dari)		
National dish	Qabuli palaw		
