= This Is the Home of the Brave =

National anthem of Afghanistan

Dā də bātorāno kor
English: 'This Is the Home of the Brave'
- دا د باتورانو کور
- Emblem of Afghanistan
- National anthem of Afghanistan
- Adopted: 1996; 30 years ago 2021; 5 years ago
- Preceded by: "Fortress of Islam, Heart of Asia" (1996); National anthem of the Islamic Republic of Afghanistan (2021)
- Succeeded by: "Fortress of Islam, Heart of Asia" (2001)

"This Is the Home of the Brave" (Pashto: دا د باتورانو کور, romanized: Dā də bātorāno kor) is a Pashto-language nasheed, currently used as the national anthem of the Islamic Emirate of Afghanistan. It is an a cappella song, meaning that it does not contain musical instruments, as instruments are considered haram by the ruling Taliban. It is based on the communist-era song "Da De Azadi Khawra".

The Islamic Emirate of Afghanistan (under Taliban rule) had formal laws specifying its flag and emblem; however, no anthem was specified. This nasheed was commonly used in the opening credits of the broadcasts by Da Shariat Zhagh ('Voice of Sharia'), the Taliban's official radio station, since the late 1990s, when the group controlled most of the Afghanistan territory, as well as in the videos published by the Taliban's Commission of Cultural Affairs. It was also used during official ceremonies. Due to that, it is considered to be the de facto national anthem of both the Taliban and the Islamic Emirate of Afghanistan.

The recording most commonly used for this anthem features the voice of Mullah Faqir Muhammad Darwesh, a popular Taliban munshid.

== Lyrics ==
Pashto original

ساتو يې په سرو وينو، دا د شهيدانو کور
𝄇 دا د باتورانو کور، دا د باتورانو کور 𝄆

کورس:
ساتو يې په سرو وينو، دا د شهيدانو کور
𝄇 دا د باتورانو کور، دا د باتورانو کور 𝄆

۱:
ستا کاڼي او بوټي ټول، مونږه ته لعلونه دي
𝄇 ستا کاڼي او بوټي ټول، مونږه ته لعلونه دي 𝄆
وينه پرې توی شوې ده، سره لکه گلونه دي
𝄇 وينه پرې توی شوې ده، سره لکه گلونه دي 𝄆
𝄇 کله يې څوک نيولای شي؟ دا دی د زمريانو کور
دا د باتورانو کور، دا د باتورانو کور 𝄆

کورس

۲:
تا به تل آزاد ساتو، څو چې وي ژوندون زمونږ
𝄇 تا به تل آزاد ساتو، څو چې وي ژوندون زمونږ 𝄆
ستا تاريخ به ياد ساتو، څو چې وي ژوندون زمونږ
𝄇 ستا تاريخ به ياد ساتو، څو چې وي ژوندون زمونږ 𝄆
𝄇 دې کې به بازان اوسي، دا دی د بازانو کور
دا د باتورانو کور، دا د باتورانو کور 𝄆

کورس

۳:
ای گرانه وطن زما، ځار شمه له تا نه زه
𝄇 ای گرانه وطن زما، ځار شمه له تا نه زه 𝄆
ای ښايسته چمن زما، ځار شمه له تا نه زه
𝄇 ای ښايسته چمن زما، ځار شمه له تا نه زه 𝄆
𝄇 خلاص که له انگرېز نه وو، شو د اورسانو گور
دا د باتورانو کور، دا د باتورانو کور 𝄆

کورس

۴:
ډېرۍ ککرۍ گوره، پاتي د روسانو شوې
𝄇 ډېرۍ ککرۍ گوره، پاتي د روسانو شوې 𝄆
شنډې د هر يو دښمن، واړه ارزوگانې شوې
𝄇 شنډې د هر يو دښمن، واړه ارزوگانې شوې 𝄆
𝄇 هر چا ته معلوم شولو، دا د افغانانو کور
دا د باتورانو کور، دا د باتورانو کور 𝄆

𝄇 کورس 𝄆

𝄇 دا د باتورانو کور... 𝄆

Pashto Romanized

Sātu ye pə sro wino, dā də šahidāno kor
𝄆 Dā də bātorāno kor, dā də bātorāno kor 𝄇

Korus:
Sātu ye pə sro wino, dā də šahidāno kor
𝄆 Dā də bātorāno kor, dā də bātorāno kor 𝄇

I:
Stā kāṇi aw boṭi ṭol, munǵa ta lāluna di
𝄆 Stā kāṇi aw boṭi ṭol, munǵa ta lāluna di 𝄇
Wina pre toy šawe da, srə laka guluna di
𝄆 Wina pre toy šawe da, srə laka guluna di 𝄇
𝄆 Kala ye śok niwəlay ši? Dā day də zmaryāno kor
Dā də bātorāno kor, dā də bātorāno kor 𝄇

Korus

II:
Tā ba təl āzād sātu, śo ce wi žwəndun zəmunǵ
𝄆 Tā ba təl āzād sātu, śo ce wi žwəndun zəmunǵ 𝄇
Stā tārix ba yād sātu, śo ce wi žwəndun zəmunǵ
𝄆 Stā tārix ba yād sātu, śo ce wi žwəndun zəmunǵ 𝄇
𝄆 De ke ba bāzān osi, dā day də bāzāno kor
Dā də bātorāno kor, dā də bātorāno kor 𝄇

Korus

III:
Ay grāna watan zəmā, źār šəma lə tā na zə
𝄆 Ay grāna watan zəmā, źār šəma lə tā na zə 𝄇
Ay x̌āysta caman zəmā, źār šəma lə tā na zə
𝄆 Ay x̌āysta caman zəmā, źār šəma lə tā na zə 𝄇
𝄆 Xlās ka lə Angrez na wu, šu də Urusāno gor
Dā də bātorāno kor, dā də bātorāno kor 𝄇

Korus

IV:
Ḍerəy kakarəy gora, pāti də Rusāno šwe
𝄆 Ḍerəy kakarəy gora, pāti də Rusāno šwe 𝄇
Šanḍe də har yaw dux̌man, wāṛə arzogāne šwe
𝄆 Šanḍe də har yaw dux̌man, wāṛə arzogāne šwe 𝄇
𝄆 Har cā ta mālum šwəlo, dā də Afǧānāno kor
Dā də bātorāno kor, dā də bātorāno kor 𝄇

𝄆 Korus 𝄇

𝄆 Dā də bātorāno kor… 𝄇

IPA transcription (Note: See Help:IPA/Pashto and Pashto phonology. The transcription is based on the Northern dialect.)

[sɑ.t̪u je pə sɾo wi.no d̪ɑ d̪ə ʃa.hi.d̪ɑ.no koɾ]
𝄆 [d̪ɑ d̪ə bɑ.t̪o.rɑ.no kor d̪ɑ d̪ə bɑ.t̪o.rɑ.no koɾ] 𝄇

[ko.ɾʊs]
[sɑ.t̪u je pə sɾo wi.no d̪ɑ d̪ə ʃa.hi.d̪ɑ.no koɾ]
𝄆 [d̪ɑ d̪ə bɑ.t̪o.rɑ.no koɾ d̪ɑ d̪ə bɑ.t̪o.rɑ.no koɾ] 𝄇

1:
[st̪ɑ kɑ.ɳi ʔaʊ bo.ʈi ʈol muŋ.ga t̪a lɑ.lu.na d̪i]
𝄆 [st̪ɑ kɑ.ɳi ʔaʊ bo.ʈi ʈol muŋ.ga t̪a lɑ.lu.na d̪i] 𝄇
[wi.na pɾe t̪oɪ ʃa.we d̪a sɾə la.ka gu.lu.na d̪i]
𝄆 [wi.na pɾe t̪oɪ ʃa.we d̪a sɾə la.ka gu.lu.na d̪i] 𝄇
𝄆 [ka.la je t͡sok ni.wə.lɑɪ ʃi d̪ɑ d̪aɪ d̪ə zmaɾ.jɑ.no koɾ]
[d̪ɑ d̪ə bɑ.t̪o.rɑ.no koɾ d̪ɑ d̪ə bɑ.t̪o.rɑ.no koɾ] 𝄇

[ko.ɾʊs]

2:
[t̪ɑ ba t̪əl ʔɑ.zɑd̪ sɑ.t̪u t͡so t͡ʃe wi ʒwən.d̪un zə.muŋg]
𝄆 [t̪ɑ ba t̪əl ʔɑ.zɑd̪ sɑ.t̪u t͡so t͡ʃe wi ʒwən.d̪un zə.muŋg] 𝄇
[st̪ɑ t̪ɑ.rix ba jɑd̪ sɑ.t̪u t͡so t͡ʃe wi ʒwən.d̪un zə.muŋg]
𝄆 [st̪ɑ t̪ɑ.rix ba jɑd̪ sɑ.t̪u t͡so t͡ʃe wi ʒwən.d̪un zə.muŋg] 𝄇
𝄆 [d̪e ke ba bɑ.zɑn ʔo.si d̪ɑ d̪aɪ d̪ə bɑ.zɑ.no koɾ]
[d̪ɑ d̪ə bɑ.t̪o.rɑ.no koɾ d̪ɑ d̪ə bɑ.t̪o.rɑ.no koɾ] 𝄇

[ko.ɾʊs]

3:
[ʔaɪ ɡɾɑ.na wa.t̪an zə.mɑ d͡zɑɾ ʃə.ma lə t̪ɑ na zə]
𝄆 [ʔaɪ ɡɾɑ.na wa.tan zə.mɑ d͡zɑɾ ʃə.ma lə t̪ɑ na zə] 𝄇
[ʔaɪ xɑɪ.st̪a t͡ʃa.man zə.mɑ d͡zɑɾ ʃə.ma lə t̪ɑ na zə]
𝄆 [ʔaɪ xɑɪ.st̪a t͡ʃa.man zə.mɑ d͡zɑɾ ʃə.ma lə t̪ɑ na zə] 𝄇
𝄆 [xlɑs ka lə ʔaŋ.gɾez na wu ʃu d̪ə ʔu.ru.sɑ.no goɾ]
[d̪ɑ d̪ə bɑ.t̪o.rɑ.no koɾ d̪ɑ d̪ə bɑ.t̪o.rɑ.no koɾ] 𝄇

[ko.ɾʊs]

4:
[ɖe.rəɪ ka.ka.rəɪ go.ra pɑ.t̪i d̪ə ru.sɑ.no ʃwe]
𝄆 [ɖe.rəɪ ka.ka.rəɪ go.ra pɑ.t̪i d̪ə ru.sɑ.no ʃwe] 𝄇
[ʃaŋ.ɖe də haɾ jaʊ d̪ux.man wɑ.ɽə ʔaɾ.zo.ɡɑ.ne ʃwe]
𝄆 [ʃaŋ.ɖe d̪ə haɾ jaʊ d̪ux.man wɑ.ɽə ʔaɾ.zo.ɡɑ.ne ʃwe] 𝄇
𝄆 [haɾ t͡ʃɑ t̪a mɑ.lum ʃwə.lo d̪ɑ d̪ə ʔaw.ɣɑ.nɑ.no koɾ]
[d̪ɑ d̪ə bɑ.t̪o.rɑ.no koɾ d̪ɑ d̪ə bɑ.t̪o.rɑ.no koɾ] 𝄇

𝄆 [ko.ɾʊs] 𝄇

𝄆 [d̪ɑ d̪ə bɑ.t̪o.rɑ.no koɾ] 𝄇

Dari translation

ما با خون خود از آن دفاع می کنیم، اینجا خانه شهداست
𝄇 اینجا خانه شجاعان است، اینجا خانه شجاعان است 𝄆

گروه کر:
ما با خون خود از آن دفاع می کنیم، اینجا خانه شهداست
𝄇 اینجا خانه شجاعان است، اینجا خانه شجاعان است 𝄆

۱
همه سنگها و بوته های شما برای ما شبیه یاقوت هستند
𝄇 همه سنگها و بوته های شما برای ما شبیه یاقوت هستند 𝄆
خون بر آنها ریخته می شود، همه آنها مانند گل رز قرمز هستند
𝄇 خون بر آنها ریخته می شود، همه آنها مانند گل رز قرمز هستند 𝄆
𝄇 به نظر شما می توان آن را فتح کرد؟ اینجا خانه شیرهاست
اینجا خانه شجاعان است، اینجا خانه شجاعان است 𝄆

گروه کر

۲
ما از آزادی شما محافظت می کنیم، تا زمانی که عمر ما ادامه داشته باشد
𝄇 ما از آزادی شما محافظت می کنیم، تا زمانی که عمر ما ادامه داشته باشد 𝄆
ما تاریخ شما را به یاد می آوریم، تا زمانی که عمر ما ادامه داشته باشد
𝄇 ما تاریخ شما را به یاد می آوریم، تا زمانی که عمر ما ادامه داشته باشد 𝄆
𝄇 عقابها در شما زندگی می کنند، اینجا خانه عقاب ها است
اینجا خانه شجاعان است، اینجا خانه شجاعان است 𝄆

گروه کر

۳
ای سرزمین عزیز من، من جانم را به خاطر تو تقدیم کردم
𝄇 ای سرزمین عزیز من، من جانم را به خاطر تو تقدیم کردم 𝄆
ای چمن زیبای من، من به خاطر تو جانم را تقدیم کردم
𝄇 ای چمن زیبای من، من به خاطر تو جانم را تقدیم کردم 𝄆
𝄇 وقتی از دست انگلیسی ها آزاد شدیم، برای گورستان روس ها شدیم
اینجا خانه شجاعان است، اینجا خانه شجاعان است 𝄆

گروه کر

۴
به این جمجمه های بیشمار نگاه کنید، این چیزی است که روس ها به جا گذاشتند
𝄇 به این جمجمه های بیشمار نگاه کنید، این چیزی است که روس ها به جا گذاشتند 𝄆
همه دشمنان شکست خورده اند، همه امیدهای آنها بر باد رفته است
𝄇 همه دشمنان شکست خورده اند، همه امیدهای آنها بر باد رفته است 𝄆
𝄇 اکنون برای همه آشکار است، اینجا خانه افغان ها است
اینجا خانه شجاعان است، اینجا خانه شجاعان است 𝄆

𝄇 گروه کر 𝄆

𝄇 اینجا خانه شجاعان است... 𝄆

English translation

We defend thee with our blood, this is the home of martyrs
𝄆 This is the home of the brave, this is the home of the brave 𝄇

Chorus:
We defend thee with our blood, this is the home of martyrs
𝄆 This is the home of the brave, this is the home of the brave 𝄇

I
All thy stones and bushes look like rubies to us
𝄆 All thy stones and bushes look like rubies to us 𝄇
Upon them blood is spilt, they are all red like roses
𝄆 Upon them blood is spilt, they are all red like roses 𝄇
𝄆 Dost thou think 'tis conquerable? This is the home of lions
This is the home of the brave, this is the home of the brave 𝄇

Chorus

II
We shall protect thy freedom, as long as our lives last
𝄆 We shall protect thy freedom, as long as our lives last 𝄇
We shall remember thy history, as long as our lives last
𝄆 We shall remember thy history, as long as our lives last 𝄇
𝄆 Eagles shall inhabit thee, this is the home of eagles
This is the home of the brave, this is the home of the brave 𝄇

Chorus

III
O my dear homeland, for thy sake I offer my life
𝄆 O my dear homeland, for thy sake I offer my life 𝄇
O my gracious field, for thy sake I offer my life
𝄆 O my gracious field, for thy sake I offer my life 𝄇
𝄆 Once freed from the English (influence), a grave of Russians we've become
This is the home of the brave, this is the home of the brave 𝄇

Chorus

IV
Behold these many skulls, remnants of the Russian foes
𝄆 Behold these many skulls, remnants of the Russian foes 𝄇
Every foe hath failed, all their hopes shattered
𝄆 Every foe hath failed, all their hopes shattered 𝄇
𝄆 Now obvious to all, this is the home of the Afghans
This is the home of the brave, this is the home of the brave 𝄇

𝄆 Chorus 𝄇

𝄆 This is the home of the brave... 𝄇

== See also ==
- National anthems of Afghanistan
