= Fortress of Islam, Heart of Asia =

Former national anthem of Afghanistan

Qal’a-yi Islām, Qalb-i Āsiyā
English: 'Fortress of Islam, Heart of Asia'
- قلعه اسلام قلب آسیا
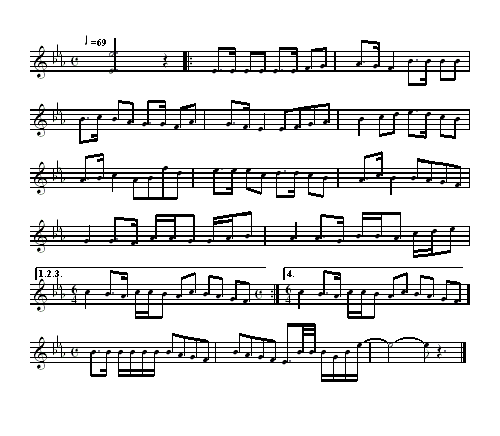
- Former national anthem of Afghanistan
- Lyrics: Daoud Farani
- Music: Ustad Qasim, 1919
- Adopted: 1992; 34 years ago
- Readopted: 2002; 24 years ago
- Relinquished: 1996; 30 years ago, 2006; 20 years ago
- Preceded by: "Garam shah lā garam shah" (1992) "Dā də bātorāno kor" (2002)
- Succeeded by: "Dā də bātorāno kor" (1996) "Millī Surūd" (2006)

Audio sample
- ملي سرود "The National Anthem": file; help

"Fortress of Islam, Heart of Asia" (Dari: قلعه اسلام قلب آسیا) is an Afghan mujahideen battle song composed in 1919 by Ustad Qasim. It was adopted as the national anthem of the Islamic State of Afghanistan from 1992 to 2006.

== History ==
During the late 1990s, the Islamic Emirate of Afghanistan under the Taliban took control over most of Afghanistan from the UN-recognized government and ruled most of the country until late 2001. The Taliban outlawed music throughout the territory that they controlled, which consisted of most of the country. As such, most of Afghanistan practically was left without a national anthem during that time, until late 2001 when the Taliban was overthrown. The song was reintroduced by the new transitional government of Afghanistan in 2002; it remained such when the Islamic Republic of Afghanistan was established in 2004 and was used by the latter until 2006.

== Lyrics ==
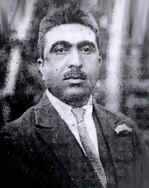
Ustad Qasim, the composer

Dari original

قلعه اسلام قلب آسیا
جاویدان آزاد خاک آریا
زادگاه قهرمانان بزرگ
سنگر رزمنده مردان خدا
الله اکبر الله اکبر الله اکبر

تیغ ایمانش به میدان جهاد
بند استبداد را از هم گسست
ملت آزاده افغانستان
در جهان زنجیر محکومان شکست
الله اکبر الله اکبر الله اکبر

هر خط قران نظام ما بود
پرچم ایمان به بام ما بود
هم صدا و هم نوا با هم روان
وحدت ملی مرام ما بود
الله اکبر الله اکبر الله اکبر

شاد زی آزاد زی آباد زی
ای وطن در نور قانون خدا
مشعل آزادگی را بر فراز
مردم سرگشته را شو راهنما
الله اکبر الله اکبر الله اکبر

Romanization of Persian

Qal’a-yi Islām, qalb-i Āsiyā,
Jāwēdān āzād, khāk-i Āriyā,
Zādgāh-i qahramānān-i buzurg,
Sangar-i razminda mardān-i Khudā
Allāhu akbar, Allāhu akbar, Allāhu akbar.

Tēgh-i īmān-ash ba maydān-i jehād,
Band-i istibdād-rā az ham gusast
Millat-i āzāda-yi Afghānistān
Dar jihān zanjīr-u mahkūmān shikast.
Allāhu akbar, Allāhu akbar, Allāhu akbar.

Har khatt-i Qur’ān nizām-i mā buwad,
Parcham-i īmān ba bām-i mā buwad,
Ham sadā o ham nawā bā ham rawān,
Wahdat-i millī marām-i mā buwad.
Allāhu akbar, Allāhu akbar, Allāhu akbar.

Shād zī, āzād zī, ābād zī,
Ay watan dar nūr-i qānūn-i Khudā.
Mash’al-i āzādagī-rā bar farāz,
Mardum-i sargushta-rā shaw rāhnamā.
Allāhu akbar, Allāhu akbar, Allāhu akbar.

IPA transcript

[qalˈʔajɪ ʔɪsˈlɑːm ˈqalbɪ ʔɑː.siˈjɑː]
[dʒɑː.weːˈdɑːn ʔɑːˈzɑːd ˈxɑːkʰɪ ʔɑː.ɾiˈjɑː]
[zɑːdˈɡɑːɦɪ qaɦ.ɾaˌmɑːˈnɑːnɪ bʊˈzʊɾɡ]
[saŋˈɡaɾɪ raz.mɪnˈda maɾˈdɑːnɪ xʊˈdɑː]
[ʔalˈlɑːɦʊ ʔakˈbaɾ ʔalˈlɑːɦʊ ʔakˈbaɾ ʔalˈlɑːɦʊ ʔakˈbaɾ]

[ˈtʰeːɣɪ ʔiː.mɑːˈnaʃ ba maɪˈdɑːnɪ dʒeˈɦɑːd]
[ˈbandɪ ʔɪs.tʰɪbˈdɑːd‿rɑː ʔaz ham ɡʊ.ˈsast]
[mɪlˈlatʰɪ ʔɑːˌzɑːˈdajɪ ʔafˌɣɑːnɪsˈtʰɑːn]
[daɾ dʒɪˈɦɑːn zanˈdʒiːr‿ʊ maɦˌkʰuːˈmɑːn ʃɪˈkʰast]
[ʔalˈlɑːɦʊ ʔakˈbaɾ ʔalˈlɑːɦʊ ʔakˈbaɾ ʔalˈlɑːɦʊ ʔakˈbaɾ]

[haɾ ˈxattʰɪ qʊɾˈʔɑːn nɪˈzɑːmɪ mɑː buːˈwad]
[pʰaɾˈtʃʰamɪ ʔiːˈmɑːn ba ˈbɑːmɪ mɑː buːˈwad]
[ham saˈdɑː ʔʊ ham naˈwɑː bɑː ham raˈwɑːn]
[waɦˈdatʰɪ mɪlˈliː maˈrɑːmɪ mɑː buːˈwad]
[ʔalˈlɑːɦʊ ʔakˈbaɾ ʔalˈlɑːɦʊ ʔakˈbaɾ ʔalˈlɑːɦʊ ʔakˈbaɾ]

[ʃɑːd ziː ʔɑːˈzɑːd ziː ʔɑːˈbɑːd ziː]
[ʔaɪ waˈtʰan daɾ ˈnuːɾɪ qɑːˈnuːnɪ xʊˈdɑː]
[maʃˈʔalɪ ʔɑːˌzɑːˌdaˈɡiː‿rɑː baɾ faˈrɑːz]
[maɾˈdʊmɪ saɾ.ɡʊʃˈtʰa‿rɑː ʃaʊ rɑːɦ.naˈmɑː]
[ʔalˈlɑːɦʊ ʔakˈbaɾ ʔalˈlɑːɦʊ ʔakˈbaɾ ʔalˈlɑːɦʊ ʔakˈbaɾ]

English translation

Fortress of Islam, heart of Asia,
Forever free, soil of the Aryans,
Birthplace of great heroes
Fellow traveler of the warriors of the men of God,
God is great! God is great! God is great!

Arrow of her faith to the arena of Jihad,
Removing the shackles of suppression,
The nation of freedom, Afghanistan,
Breaks the chains of the oppressed in the world.
God is great! God is great! God is great!

Let the lines of the Qur'an be our order,
Let the banner of faith be on our roof,
With the echoes and the voices going together,
Let national unity be what we strive for,
God is great! God is great! God is great!

Live happy, live free, live and prosper,
Oh homeland in the light of God’s law,
Lift the torch of freedom high,
Become a leader for the people who are oppressed,
God is great! God is great! God is great!

== See also ==
- List of former national anthems
- Music of Afghanistan
- National anthems of Afghanistan
