= Afghan National Civil Order Force =

Afghan Police Force

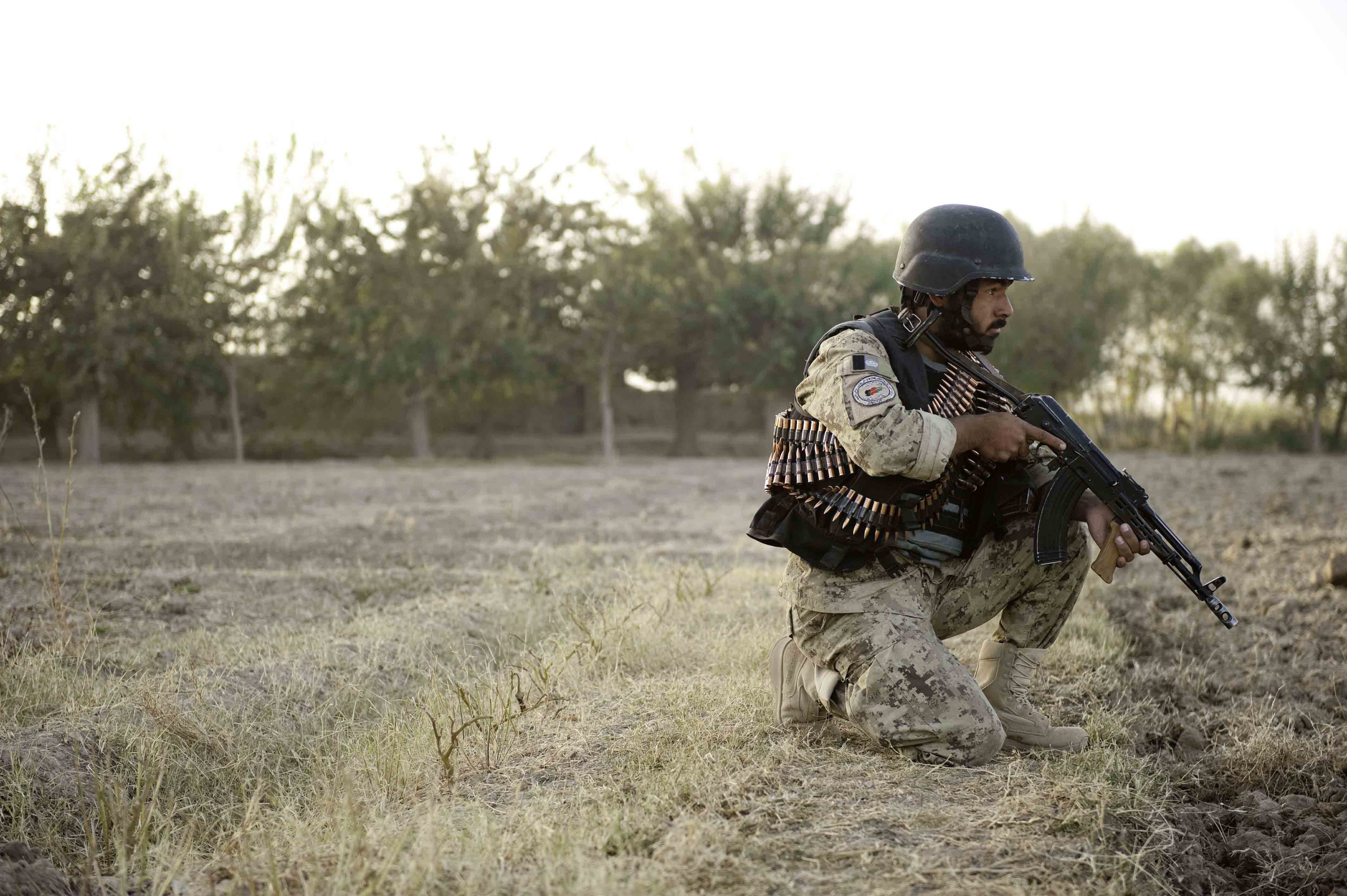
- A soldier of the Afghan National Civil Order Force on patrol in the Zhari District
- Active: July 2006 – June 2020
- Country: Islamic Republic of Afghanistan
- Branch: Afghan National Army
- Type: Police Force
- Role: Counterinsurgency
- Size: 5,365
- Engagements: War in Afghanistan

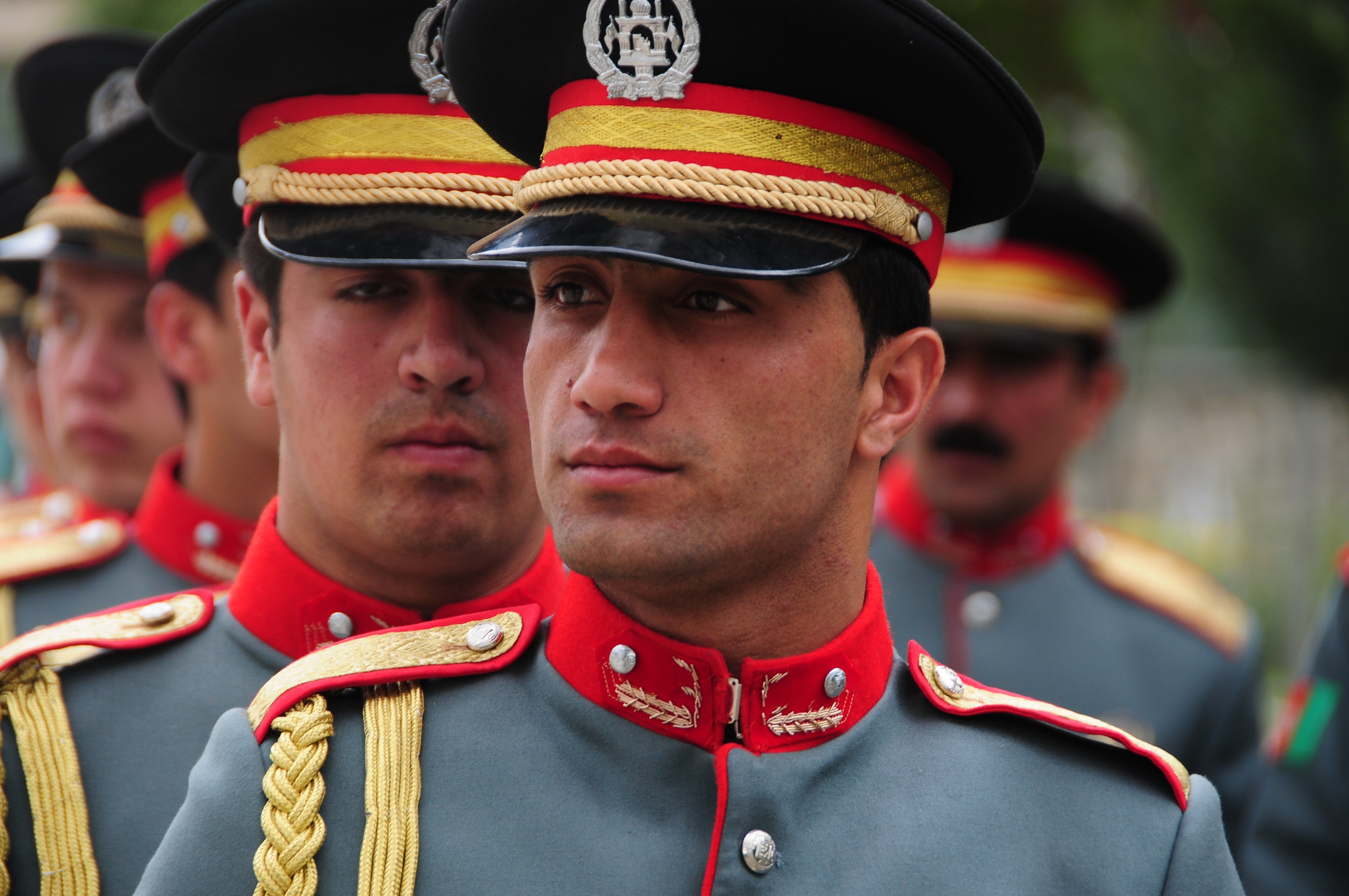
An ANCOP honor guard stands in formation at the Ministry of the Interior in Kabul, Afghanistan.

The Afghan National Civil Order Force (ANCOF), formerly known as the Afghan National Civil Order Police (ANCOP), was an Afghan National Army (ANA) force responsible for civil order and counterinsurgency.

The ANCOP was developed in July 2006 by Colonel Jack Stankiewicz, US Army, Police Reformation Directorate, CSTC-A. It had stations in major cities and towns across Afghanistan.

== History ==
In March 2018, most of the ANCOP personnel of the Afghan National Police were transferred to the Afghan National Army to form the ANCOF with their role remaining the same. The remaining 2,550 ANCOP personnel in the Afghan National Police formed the Public Security Police (PSP). The ANCOF consisted of eight brigades.

In June 2020, the ANA began disbanding the ANCOF brigades with personnel to be integrated into ANA Corps.

== Role ==
ANCOP's mission was to provide civil order presence patrols, prevent violent public incidents, and provide crisis and anti-terror response in urban and metropolitan environments. Like the Afghan Border Police, ANCOP used to be a branch of the Afghan National Police (ANP), under the nation's Ministry of Interior Affairs. However, both units, ANCOP and Border Police were transferred to the Defense Ministry.

== Organization ==
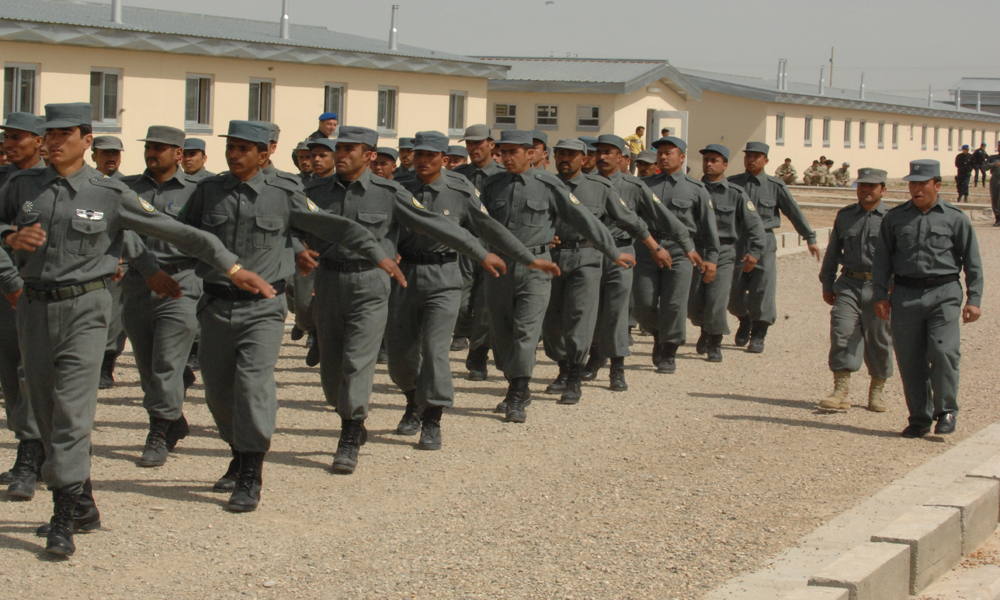
Afghan National Civil Order Police Training Center in Mazar-i-Sharif, in northern Afghanistan.

ANCOP's 5,365 authorized strength was commanded by a Major General. ANCOP was divided into five Brigades, each commanded by a Brigadier General. These brigades were stationed in Kabul, Paktia, Kandahar, Herat, and Mazar-i-Sharif.

Given they underwent 16 weeks of training and had a higher literacy rate than the regular Afghan National Police, ANCOP were generally considered a more elite force than the regular ANP that used to oversee them. They were one of the most deployable force of the ANP.

Since December 2009, French gendarmes (43 in March 2011) and Spanish officers, Dutch and Polish, under the mandate of the European Gendarmerie Force, operated in the training center of the Afghan National Civil Order Police to Mazar-e-Sharif. The training center in Western Afghanistan's Herat Province was staffed with a contingent of Italian Carbinieri augmented by a number of Polish Military Police and United States Marines.

The ANCOP were utilized as a replacement force when a local unit of ANP were sent for initial training to a NATO-led basic training facility. As well, ANCOP were also heavily utilized as a "surge" force of police wherever necessary within the country. As a result, an average ANCOP officer had been deployed on the front lines for a longer average time than his regular ANP counterpart; which had created an inordinate amount of turnover within the ANCOP force.

=== Special Support Battalion ===
It had two SWAT teams, several explosive ordnance disposal teams, a heavy weapons company, transportation company and logistics support company.

=== Salary and benefits ===
In return for the higher commitment of training and fighting, ANCOP officers were promoted to sergeant and received approximately $265 a month, roughly double the salary of a regular new ANP recruit. The ANCOP personnel have thwarted several insurgent attacks over the last few years in Kabul.
