= Abdul Bari Jahani =

Afghan poet and novelist (born 1948)

- Born: 14 February 1948 (age 78); Kandahar, Afghanistan
- Occupations: Poet, novelist, journalist, historian
- Notable work: Afghan National Anthem

Abdul Bari Jahani (Pashto: عبدالباري جهاني, pronounced [ʔabˌdʊl ˈbɑri dʒaˈhɑni]; born 14 February 1948) is an Afghan poet, novelist, historian, journalist, and politician. He wrote the lyrics for the national anthem of the Islamic Republic of Afghanistan.

== Early life and education ==
Jahani was born in Kandahar, Afghanistan. Jahani often recalls his childhood in Kandahar, where he spent most of his teenage years, and talks about how Kandahar was once a melting pot and a common home for all ideologies and beliefs. In his Raazo-Niyaaz book, Jahani talks about how he grew up playing in Kandahar as a child and how peaceful Kandahar was during his high school time.

Jahani's ethnicity is unknown. In one of his books, Jahani himself denotes that his uncle's wife once mentioned to him that he might be from the Ludin tribe, a sub-tribe of Ghilzai, one of the two main tribes of Pashtuns. Other sources, including his Pashto and Persian articles in Wikipedia has written that he is a Hotak, a sub-tribe of Ghilzai. However, a lecturer of Kabul University's Faculty of Economics and one of the most prominent economic experts in Afghanistan, Ustad Said Masoud, declares that Abdul Bari Jahani is a Tajik, originally from Ghazni province of Afghanistan (hence, Abdul Bari Jahani's ethnic identity is unknown and could not be confirmed). It is believed that he considers the ethnic diversity of Afghanistan, with its various tribes and ethnic groups, as constituting the country's strength, and thinks that Afghans have shown throughout the history of their country that they are united and one hand. Their unity is better portrayed when they face an outside threat as a nation or when their country is celebrating a national victory. However, Jahani has turned to one of the main sources of negative publication against the Barakzai rulers of Afghanistan, especially King Amanullah Khan, the sovereign of Afghanistan from 1919, first as Emir and after 1926 as King, whose rule was marked by dramatic political and social change, including attempts to modernise Afghanistan along Western lines. Thus, various prominent Afghan writers, including Dr. Said Abdullah Kazim, and Nominated - Academician Mohammad Azam Sistan have questioned Jahani's ability of accurate referencing and free from all prejudice, favoritism and unbiased writing.

Jahani completed his primary, secondary, and high school in Mirwais Nika High School, Kandahar. Kandahar University was not yet built when Jahani finished his high school. Upon completing his high school at Mirwais Nika, Jahani only had two options for his higher education. He could either move to Kabul to study what he wanted to study which was history and literature or move to Nangarhar province—home to the second Afghan university at the time in the country. He chose the former one because unlike Kabul University where students had the option to pursue various majors, Nangarhar University only offered education in the field of medicine.

Jahani graduated from Kabul University in 1972 with a BA in Pashto Literature and History. Upon his graduation from Kabul University, he joined the Pashto Tolana which promotes Pashto literature and culture, and whose members have been prominent Afghan philosophers, historians, poets and writers. Pashto Tolana approves the entrance of new terminologies into Pashto language and is tasked to develop Pashto language to be richer in terms of new vocabulary. Jahani made significant contribution to the development of Pashto language while at Pashto Tolana

== Career ==
Jahani was given a parliamentary vote of approval to serve as a minister in the cabinet of the Afghan unity government in 2015 for the ministry of information and culture.

Besides being a member of the Pashto Society, Jahani served as Managing Editor of Kabul Magazine. Under his leadership, Kabul Magazine witnessed considerable increase in its readership. In his capacity as Managing Editor of the magazine, Jahani oversaw the flow of hundreds of informative and educative social, economic and political articles aimed at keeping the Afghan public aware of the state of affairs of their country. Subsequently, Jahani served in the Afghan Ministry of Education (MoE) for two years before he was forced to leave the country during the Soviet invasion of Afghanistan. Jahani's mission from the very beginning was to inspire Afghan society to walk towards knowledge and education and for that noble goal he join the Afghan government's education sector.

Communists and leftists feared voices of prominent figures like Jahani and began a government planned campaign against influential and intellectual figures. Jahani migrated to Pakistan as a refugee and after two years of living as a refugee there, Jahani was offered a job with Voice of America in Washington D.C. Jahani accepted the offer and joined the Voice of America's Pashto service in 1983 as an International broadcaster. He has contributed extensively to Pashto language programing of the Radio. Jahani hosted political talk shows, news hour shows and poetry shows at the Voice of America. His poetry show of late 11PM called Də Ašnayāno Adabi dera had listeners in the entire South Asian region and the Middle East. His poetry show had listeners from different age groups including youths and elders. One of his most famous poem which had a huge demand and continues to have, was the story of "three cows and one wolf" that was written in the language of poetry. The moral of the poem is unity. Like most of his other poetry, in his "three cow one wolf" poem Jahani speaks to his audiences in a plain, natural and understandable language. He warns them of what is at stake if Afghans remain divided and what could be achieved if Afghans leave behind their differences and get united behind a common goal of building a prosperous, stable and peaceful Afghanistan.

Jahani continued to use his able mind and pen and VOA provided him the platform to convey his message of enlightenment to various parts of Afghanistan. With Jahani's contribution and dedication to excellence and his prominence and popularity amongst Afghans, VOA's Pashto service ratings and listeners have soared. Jahani's career as a journalist with the Voice of America has earned him several recognitions and medals from the leadership of the Voice of America. He retired from the Voice of America in 2010, but never ceased to end his advocacy for Afghan unity, Afghan education and Afghan prosperity. He regularly gets offers to speak at various Afghan events held in Afghanistan, Middle East, Europe and the United States and regularly gets interview request by various Afghan TV and Radio stations in Afghanistan and around the world. Not only that Jahani's articles about social, political and economic situation of Afghanistan are well received by various public and private print and online media outlets in Afghanistan and around the world. Jahani regularly visits Afghanistan and speak at various events including seminars discussing Pashto literature and education.

=== Refugee status and its impact on Jahani's poetry ===
Jahani often refers to the hardships of leaving behind the place where he was born and learned how to walk. His obsession with his homeland, Afghanistan and his constant commendation of all parts of Afghanistan in his poetry has earned him a special place in the hearts of all Afghans from all walks of life and from all ethnic groups. Through his poetry, he commends the beautiful rivers, mountains, ranches and deserts of Afghanistan and how expresses pride in them. In his Wraka Mayna ('lost home') poetry collection, Jahani expresses his deep love and compassion for his homeland Afghanistan. The title of the book means lost homeland. In Jahani's words this book is dedicated to those who have been convicted by fate, whose mouths have been forcibly shut by the unjust rulers and whose pens have been limited by the people of the time.

=== Pashto literature ===
Jahani is considered to be the contemporary Rahman Baba and Khushal Khan Khattak who are two prominent Afghan warrior poets of the 17th century. Jahani's poetry has various themes including epic, romance, patriotism, bravery and a message of enlightenment. He has published dozens of books in poetry and has translated several Persian poetry books from Persian into Pashto in the language of poetry which is a difficult task to undertake. Besides that Jahani has translated several English books into Pashto. His main poetry books include:

- Də Moško Karwān (د مشکو کاروان)
- Wraka Mayna (ورکه مېنه)
- Rāzo-Niyāz (رازو نیاز)
- Də Sabawun pa Tama (د سباوون په تمه)
- Špelay (شپېلۍ)
- Pāykob (پایکوب)
- Koh Tur (کوه طور)
- Kawsar (کوثر)

Jahani's novels and history books include:

- Də Pəx̌to pa sur aw tāl ki də ǧarbi sandaro šṛang ( د پښتو په سور او تال کي د غربي سندرو شړنګ)
- Herāt, Pəx̌tāna, aw stara loba (هرات، پښتانه، ستره لوبه)
- Də xiyām robāyāt də Pəx̌to pa tāl ki (د خیام ربایات د پښتو په تال کي)

=== National anthem and Constitution ===
Jahani is considered the most prominent Pashtun poet of the contemporary era. Because of his prominence in Pashto literature and poetry, he was officially requested by the President of Afghanistan, Hamid Karzai to write the Afghan national anthem in 2006. Prior to that, Jahani also advised the Afghan commission tasked with writing the new constitution in 2004. Jahani's lyrics were adopted as the national anthem and officially announced at a meeting of the Loya Jirga in May 2006.

=== Other translations ===
His poem Wyār ('Pride') has been translated into English by Dawood Azami and the Poetry Translation Centre.

=== Popular support and politics ===
Jahani is considered a very influential person in Afghanistan and politicians often rely on his influence over all Afghans particularly Pashtuns in the South and East of the country. Presidential hopefuls during both 2005 and 2009 elections have tried to get Jahani to back their bids for presidency to attract more voters from the south and the east of Afghanistan. Jahani is believed to be in favor of politicians who work for all Afghans regardless of their ethnicity and political affiliations. Jahani believes in a united Afghanistan and often backed leaders who represent all Afghans from all ethnic groups. Jahani backed Dr. Ashraf Ghani Ahmadzai in the 2009 Afghan presidential elections; Ashraf Ghani became the president of Afghanistan in the April 2014 presidential elections.

Jahani was supported by a large number of Afghans to run for presidency in the 2014 elections, but he chose not to.

Jahani is a strong critic and opponent of corruption in Afghanistan and his intellectual crusade against the rampant corruption of the Afghan government has impacted his relationships with President Karzai who has a long-standing friendship with Jahani. Their friendship witnessed further rift when Jahani backed the bid of Ashraf Ghani Ahmadzai for president in the 2009 elections of Afghanistan in which Hamid Karzai won a second term in office.

== Criticism ==
Jahani is criticized by some for basing some of his poetry on an epic theme which according to critics invites people to war and violence, but his proponents not only defend his epic poetry and his efforts to depict Afghan history in the language of poems, but also claim that Jahani's poetry invites Afghans to unity, solidarity, peace, education and progress. His recent poem that sparked a national debate amongst scholars about what role intellectuals could play in conflict resolution efforts was about a suicide bomber and his mother in which he depicted good through the role of a desperate mother and bad through the role of a brainwashed son who wanted to carry out a suicide attack for a quest to earn heaven and salvation. Some critics viewed the poem as recognition of suicide attacks as a legitimate and glorifying act while others viewed the poem as informative and educative for those people who fall victims of terrorists and extremists. The poem lets mother mercy and humanity win over the hatred, violence and evil of the to-be suicide bomber son. The poem is written in a dialogue form between a mother and a son. The poem is set to music by Afghan singer Bashir Maidani with the title "Nasihat" available on YouTube and Maidani's 2011 album Afsoz; the song is very popular amongst Pashtoons in the world because of Jahani's excellent poetry.

== Singers ==
Jahani's poems have been picked by well-known Afghan singers such as Dr. Fetrat Nashnas, Farhaad Darya, Waheed Qasemi, Waheed Saberi, Bashir Maidani and other Afghan singers.
