= National anthems of Afghanistan =

National anthem of Afghanistan

Afghanistan has had a number of different national anthems throughout its history as the country has changed governments numerous times mostly resulting from political instability.

== History ==
=== The Royal Salute (1926–1943) ===
Afghanistan's first national anthem was adopted during its period as a monarchy. It was instrumental and had no lyrics.

=== Grand Salute (Our Brave and Noble King) (1943–1973) ===
This was Afghanistan's second national anthem during its monarchical period.

=== Be ardent, be more ardent (1978–1992) ===
Another national anthem was adopted after the Democratic Republic of Afghanistan was set up in 1978. Its lyrics were written by Sulaiman Layeq on behalf of the government of the People's Democratic Party of Afghanistan (PDPA) headed by Nur Muhammad Taraki, who decided to change the national symbols after the Marxist coup d'état of 1978. The music was composed by Jalīl Ghahlānd and was arranged by Ustad Salim Sarmad. It is known alternatively by the title of "Garam shah lā garam shah" (English: "Be ardent, be more ardent"), which is also the song's incipit. Like many national anthems, it was sometimes sung abbreviated, with only the chorus and the first stanza. In 1986, Afghanistan officially abandoned communism, but this song was kept as the national anthem until 1992, when it was discontinued.

=== Fortress of Islam, Heart of Asia (1992–1996, 2001–2006) ===
From 1992 to 2006, Afghanistan used a mujahideen battle song composed in 1919 by Ustad Qasim as its national anthem. It is also known alternatively by the title "Fortress of Islam, Heart of Asia" (Persian: قلعه اسلام قلب اسیا), which is also the song's incipit.

The song was reintroduced by the new transitional government of Afghanistan in 2002; it remained such when the Islamic Republic of Afghanistan was established in 2004 and was used by the latter until 2006.

=== This Is the Home of the Brave (1996–2001, 2021–present) ===
During the late 1990s, the Islamic Emirate of Afghanistan under the Taliban took control over most of Afghanistan from the UN-recognized government and ruled most of the country until late 2001. The Taliban did not have formal laws specifying its symbols, including the flag and the anthem. An a capella nasheed song named This Is the Home of the Brave (Pashto: دا د باتورانو کور, romanized: Dā də bātorāno kor) was used in its media and official ceremonies, serving as a de facto national anthem.

=== National anthem of the Islamic Republic of Afghanistan (2006–2021) ===
A new National Anthem (Dari: سرود ملی, romanized: Surūd-e Millī, Pashto: ملی سرود, romanized: Millī Surūd; lit. 'National anthem') was adopted and officially announced as such by a Loya Jirga in May 2006. According to Article 20 of the Afghan constitution, the national anthem shall be in Pashto with the mention of "God is Greatest" as well as the names of the ethnicities in Afghanistan. The lyrics were written by Abdul Bari Jahani, and the music was written by German–Afghan composer Babrak Wassa.

== See also ==
- List of former national anthems
- Music of Afghanistan
- National symbols of Afghanistan
