= Pashto phonology =

Sounds used in an Iranian language

Amongst the Iranian languages, the phonology of Pashto is of middle complexity, but its morphology is very complex.

== Consonants ==
Consonant phonemes of Pashto
	Labial		Dental/ alveolar		Post- alveolar		Retroflex		Palatal		Velar		Uvular	Glottal
Nasal		m		n				ɳ				ŋ^{1}		
Plosive	p	b	t̪	d̪			ʈ	ɖ			k	ɡ	(q)^{2}	
Affricate			t͡s^{3}	d͡z^{3}	t͡ʃ	d͡ʒ								
Fricative	(f)^{2}		s	z	ʃ	ʒ^{4}	ʂ^{5}	ʐ^{5}	(ç	ʝ)	x^{6}	ɣ^{9}		h
Approximant				l			ɽ^{7}			j		w		
Rhotic				r^{8}			ɽ^{7}							

Retroflex sounds in Pashto
ږ /ʐ/
غْوَږ [ɣwaʐ] 'ear' (n. masc. sg.)

ښ /ʂ/
ښْکارېدۀ [ʂkɑreˈd̪ə] 'was visible' (v. 3.sg. masc. impf.)

ڼ /ɳ/
اَتَڼ [aˈt̪aɳ] 'attan' (n. masc. sg.)

ړ /ɽ/
لَړَه [ˈlaɽa] 'fog' (n. fem. sg.)

ډ /ɖ/
ګاډیْ [ˈɡɑɖa̽ɪ] 'car, vehicle' (n. masc. sg.)

ټ /ʈ/
ګَټَه [ˈɡaʈa] 'rock; profit, benefit' (n. fem. sg.)

Dental-alveolar affricates in Pashto
څ and ځ
/t͡s/ and /d͡z/

څه 'what'
/t͡sə/ [sə] (Northern dialects)

منځ 'middle'
/mand͡z/ [manz] (Northern dialects)

^{1.} The voiced velar nasal /ŋ/ is not represented by a separate letter in the Pashto alphabet, but naturally occurs as an allophonic variant of the voiced alveolar nasal /n/ before velar consonants.
^{2.} The voiceless uvular plosive /q/ (ق) and the voiceless labiodental fricative /f/ (ف) primarily appear in loanwords borrowed from Persian of Arabic origin. In Pashto, the former tends to be replaced with the voiceless velar plosive /k/ or the voiceless velar fricative /x/, and the latter tends to be replaced with the voiceless labiodental plosive /p/.
^{3.} The voiced /d͡z/ (ځ) and voiceless alveolar affricates /t͡s/ (څ) remain in the Kandahar (Southwestern) and Quetta (Southeastern) dialects, as well as among majority of the Karlani dialects. In the Derajat region, these respectfully tend to be simplified to the voiced /d͡ʒ/ and voiced palato-alveolar sibilant affricates /t͡ʃ/. Whereas in the Northwestern and Northeastern Dialects, they are simplified to the voiced /z/ and voiceless alveolar fricatives /s/.
^{4.} The voiced postalveolar fricative /ʒ/ (ژ) exists within the majority of Pashto dialects, but changes to the voiced alveolar fricative /z/ in the Derajat region and the Northwestern Dialect, and to the voiced palato-alveolar sibilant affricate /d͡ʒ/ in the Northeastern Dialect, specifically in Peshawar and Swat.
^{5.} The Pashto letters (ږ) and (ښ) have the most variation in pronunciations; from the archaic Kandahar (Southwestern) voiced /ʐ/ and voiceless retroflex sibilant fricatives /ʂ/, which had shifted to the voiced /ʝ/ and voiceless palatal fricatives /ç/ in the Northwestern Dialect, and from it to the voiced velar plosive /g/ (through phonological fortition/stop reinforcement) and the voiceless velar fricative /x/ in the Northeastern Dialect. On the other hand, it got simplified to the voiced /ʒ/ and voiceless postalveolar fricatives /ʃ/, specifically in the Quetta (Southeastern) and Derajat Dialects.
^{6.} The Pashto letter (خ) is mostly pronounced as a voiceless velar fricative /x/, and as a voiceless uvular fricative /χ/ in some accents of the Northeastern Dialect, particularly in the regions of Peshawar and Swat.
^{7.} The Pashto letter (ړ) is a voiced retroflex flap /ɽ/ most of the time, but tends to be a lateral flap /𝼈/ at the beginning of a syllable or other prosodic unit, and a regular flap or approximant /ɻ/ elsewhere.
^{8.}The Pashto letter (ر) is pronounced with a voiced alveolar trill /r/ when it is typically used at the beginning of a syllable, and the voiced alveolar tap or flap /ɾ/ is pronounced in between vowels and in word-end position.
^{9.} The Pashto letter (غ) is mostly pronounced as a voiced velar fricative /ɣ/, and as a voiced uvular fricative /ʁ/ in some accents of the Northeastern Dialect, particularly in the regions of Peshawar and Swat.

- Voiceless stops and affricates /p, t, ʈ, t͡s, t͡ʃ, k/ are all unaspirated; they have slightly aspirated allophones prevocalically in a stressed syllable, almost like English.

=== Dialects ===
ښ (in dialects)
/x/, /ç/, /ʂ/, /ʃ/

Example: ښار 'city'
[xɑɾ], [çɑɾ], [ʂɑɾ], [ʃɑɾ]

ږ (in dialects)
/g/, /ʝ/, /ʐ/, /ʒ/

Example: کېږي 'to do.3.SG.PRS.CONT'
[ˈkegi], [ˈkeʝi], [ˈkeʐi], [ˈkeʒi]

Dialectal allophones represented by ښ and ږ. The retroflex variants [ʂ, ʐ] are used in the southwestern dialects, whereas the post-alveolar variants [ʃ, ʒ] are used in southeastern dialects. The palatal variants [ç, ʝ] are used in the Wardak and Central Ghilji dialects. In the northeastern dialects, ښ and ږ merge with the velar [x, g].

Dropping of /h/ (in dialects)
General
هَلٙک [haˈlək]

Yusupazi
اَلٙک [aˈlək]

== Phonotactics ==
Pashto syllable structure can be summarized as follows; parentheses enclose optional components:

- (C_{1} C_{2} (C_{3})) (S_{1}) V (S_{2}) (C_{4} (C_{5}))

Pashto syllable structure consists of an optional syllable onset, consisting of one or two consonants; an obligatory syllable nucleus, consisting of a vowel optionally preceded by and/or followed by a semivowel; and an optional syllable coda, consisting of one or two consonants. The following restrictions apply:

- Onset
  - First consonant (C_{1}): Can be any consonant, including a liquid (/l, r/).
  - Second consonant (C_{2}): Can be any consonant.
  - Third consonant (C_{3}): Can be any consonant. (see #Consonant Clusters below)
- Nucleus
  - Semivowel (S_{1})
  - Vowel (V)
  - Semivowel (S_{2})
- Coda
  - First consonant (C_{4}): Can be any consonant
  - Second consonant (C_{5}): Can be any consonant

=== Consonant clusters ===
Pashto has a lot of word-initial consonant clusters in all dialects; some hundred such clusters occurs. However, there is no consonant gemination.

Consonant clusters examples
/ʂk/
ښْکَنْځٙل [ʂkanˈd͡zəl] 'to abuse'

/ʒb/
ژباړٙل [ʒbɑˈɽəl] 'to translate'

/zd/
زْدَه [zd̪a] 'learned, learnt'

/ŋɡ/
نَنْګ [naŋɡ] 'honour'

/lm/
لْمُونْځ [lmund͡z] 'prayer'

	Examples
Two consonant clusters	/tl/, /kl/, /bl/, /ɣl/, /lm/, /nm/, /lw/, /sw/, /br/, /tr/, /ɣr/, /pr/, /dr/, /wr/, /kɽ/, /mɽ/, /wɽ/, /bʐ/, /ʐɡ/, /ɡʐ/, /xp/, /pʃ/, /pʂ/, /xr/, /zb/, /zɽ/, /ʒb/, /d͡zm/, /md͡z/, /t͡sk/, /sk/, /sp/, /ʃp/, /ʂk/, /xk/, /ʃk/, /kʃ/, /kx/, /kʂ/, /ml/, /ɡr/, /ɡm/ and /ʐm/ etc.
Three consonant clusters	/sxw/, /xwɽ/, /xwl/, /nɣw/ etc.

=== Examples ===
An edited (Note: With some corrected IPA for words mentioned therein . Sources of correction: Kaye (1997), Zeeya Pashtoon (2009) and Qamosona.com) list from the book Pashto Phonology by M.K. Khan:

	IPA	Meaning	
V	[o]	'was' (dialectal)	و
VC	[as]	'horse'	اَس
VCC	[aɾt̪]	'loose'	اَرْت
CV	[t̪ə]	'you'	تٙه
CVC	[ɖeɾ]	'many, very'	ډېر
CVCC	[lund̪]	'wet'	لُونْد
CCV	[mlɑ]	back	مْلا
CCVC	[klak]	'hard'	کْلَک
CCVCC	[ʒwənd̪]	'life'	ژْوٙنْد
CCCV	[ˈxʷlə]	'mouth'	خْوْلٙه
CCCVC	[nd̪ɾoɾ]	'sister-in-law'	نْدْرور
CCCVCC	[ʃxʷand̪]	'chewing [of food]'	شْخْوَنْد

== Vowels ==
Diphthongs
ی /aɪ/
ښووٙنْځَیْ [xowənˈd͡za̽ɪ̯] 'school'

ۍ /əɪ/
سِيلۍ [siˈləɪ̯] 'wind'

او /aʊ/
او [a̽ʊ̯] 'and'

ای /ɑɪ/
چای [t͡ʃɑɪ̯] 'tea'

او /ɑʊ/
نْياو [njɑʊ̯] 'justice'

وی /oɪ/
.لویْ [loɪ̯] 'big'

وی /uɪ/
دُوىْ [d̪uɪ̯] 'they'

Most dialects in Pashto have seven vowels and seven diphthongs.

	Front	Central	Back
Close	i ـي، ـِ		u ـُو، ـُ
Mid	e ـې	ə ـٙ	o ـو
Open	a ـَ		ɑ ـا

- Tegey & Robson (1996) also include near-close vowels /ɪ/ and /ʊ/.

=== Prehistory ===
There are many complexities on the development from Proto-Iranian into the modern Pashto vowel inventory (romanization will be used here):

- *a > ā /ɑ/ in a stressed closed syllable (lā́s < *jásta- 'hand')
  - ā > o before w (owə́ < *haftá) or if there is u or w in the next syllable (pox < *paxwá-); sometimes also in adjectives (corb < *čarpá)

=== Diphthongs ===
	Front		Central	Back	
Close				uɪ ـُوىْ	
Mid			əɪ ـئ، ـۍ	oɪ ـوىْ	
Open	aɪ ـَىْ	aʊ ـَوْ		ɑɪ ـاىْ	ɑʊ ـاوْ

Elfenbein notes that the long diphthongs [ɑi, ɑw] are always stressed, whilst the short diphthongs may or may not be stressed.

== Stress ==
Pashto has phonemic variable stress, unique amongst Iranian languages.

For instance, in verbs to distinguish aspect:

Spelling	Imperfective verb (mostly final stress)	Meaning	Perfective verb (initial stress)	Meaning
کېناسْتٙلٙم	[kenɑstə́ləm]	'I was sitting'	[kénɑstələm]	'I sat down'
کېناسْتٙم	[kenɑstə́m]	'I was sitting'	[kénɑstəm]	'I sat down'
بَه کېنٙم	[ba kenə́m]	'I shall be sitting'	[ba kénəm]	'I shall sit'

Stress to distinguish aspect for کښېناستم
First pronunciation: imperfective aspect with final stress [ә́m], Second pronunciation: perfective aspect with initial stress on prefix [ké]

=== Basic word stress ===
Stress is indicated by the IPA stress marker [ˈ].

In general, the last syllable is stressed if the word ends in a consonant, and the penultimate syllable is stressed if the last syllable ends in a vowel.

Example	IPA	Meaning
رَنْځُور	[ranˈd͡zuɾ]	'sick' (adj. masc.)
رَنْځُورَه	[ranˈd͡zura]	'sick' (adj. fem.)
کورُونَه	[koˈruna]	'houses' (n. masc. pl.)
ښٙځو	[ˈʂəd͡zo]	'women' (n. fem. pl. obl.)
لانْدې	[ˈlɑnd̪e]	'below' (adv. circumpos.)
ځْمٙکْپوهٙنَه	[d͡zmək.poˈhəna]	'geography' (n. fem.)

==== Masculine words ending in "ə" ====
These have final stress generally.

Example	IPA	Meaning
تېرٙه	[t̪eˈrə]	'sharp' (adj.)
لېوٙه	[leˈwə]	'wolf' (n.)

==== Feminine words ending in "o" ====
These end in a stressed /o/.

Example	IPA	Meaning
بِيزو	[biˈzo]	'monkey'
پِيشو	[piˈʃo]	'cat'
وَرْشو	[waɾˈʃo]	'meadow, pasture'

==== Wordings ending in aleph ====
Words ending in IPA /ɑ/ i.e. ا are stressed in the last syllable.

Example	IPA	Meaning
اَشْنا	[aʃˈnɑ]	'familiar' (n. masc.)
رَڼا	[raˈɳɑ]	'light' (n. fem.)

=== Exceptions ===
Pronunciation: [ˈd͡ʒoɽa] 'well', [d͡ʒoˈɽa] 'pair'; [ˈaspa] 'mare', [asˈpa] 'spotted fever'
Recording of a native speaker demonstrating the differences in words caused by stress

Word meanings also change upon stress.

Word	IPA	Meaning 1	IPA	Meaning 2
جوړَه	[ˈd͡ʒoɽa]	'well'	[d͡ʒoˈɽa]	'pair'
اَسپَه	[ˈaspa]	'mare'	[asˈpa]	'spotted fever'

== Intonation ==
=== Questions ===
Pashto Intonation Examples
Question formed by using interrogative words
'Where do you work?' (hat pattern intonation)

Question formed by use of intonation
'They reap the wheat?' (rising intonation)

Contrastive focus statement
'No, I am younger than him.' (low-high-low)

WH-Questions (who, where, when, etc.) follow a hat pattern of intonation: a rise in pitch followed by a fall in pitch.

تاسو چېرْتَه کار کَوئ
[tɑ́so ↗tʃérta kɑr kawə́ɪ↘]

Yes/No-Questions end in a high intonation: a rise in pitch.

غَنٙم يې وٙرېبٙل؟
[ɣanə́m je wә́rebəl↗]

=== Contrastive focus ===
When a word is contrasted with another word it carries a low then high pitch accent, followed by a sharp fall in pitch accent.

نَه لٙه دٙ نٙه کٙشٙر يٙم
[na↘ lə ↗də nə kə́ʃər jə́m↘]

== Dialectal phonology ==
=== Consonants ===
This diagram is based on Anna Boyle's division of the dialect variations on geographic regions:

Dialect	ښ	ږ	څ	ځ	ژ
Southwestern dialects e.g., Sharkhbun dialects (Kandahar–Herat, southwestern Afghanistan)	ʂ	ʐ	t͡s	d͡z	ʒ
Southeastern dialects e.g., Ghurghusht and Lodi dialects (Quetta–Zhob and Dera Ismail Khan–Bannu, southwestern Pakistan)	ʃ	ʒ	t͡s (in Ghurghusht dialect) t͡ʃ (in Lodi dialect)	d͡z (in Ghurghusht dialect) d͡ʒ (in Lodi dialect)	ʒ (in Ghurghusht dialect) z (in Lodi dialect)
Central dialects e.g., Karlani dialects (Paktika–Tirah, southeastern Afghanistan and western Pakistan)	ç (in Zadrani) ɕ (in Waziri)	ʝ (in Zadrani) ʑ (in Waziri)	t͡s	d͡z	ʒ
Northwestern dialects e.g., Wardak and Ghilji dialects (Zabul–Maidan Wardak, northwestern Afghanistan)	ç	ʝ	s and t͡s	z and d͡z	ʒ and z
Northeastern dialects e.g., Kharshbun dialects (Kabul–Kunar and Swat–Peshawar, northeastern Afghanistan and northwestern Pakistan)	x	ɡ	s	z	ʒ (in northeastern Afghanistan) d͡ʒ (in northwestern Pakistan)

==== Regional variation ====
This diagram, however, does not factor in the regional variations within the broad geographic areas. Compare the following consonant and vowel differences amongst regions categorised as northern dialects:

ښٙه يٙمَه (in northern dialects)
Northwestern
[çə ˈjəma]

Northeastern
[xə ˈjəma]

		Northern dialects		
	Meaning	Wardak	Jalalabad	Bati Kot
دوی	'they'	[deɪ̯] دېى	[ˈduj] دُویْ	[ˈduj] دُویْ
راکړه	'give' (imperative of راکَوٙل)	[ˈrɑka] راکَه	[ˈrɑka] راکَه	[ˈrɑkɽa] راکْړَه
پوهېدل	'to know'	[pijeˈd̪əl] پِيېدٙل	[pojeˈd̪əl] پويېدٙل	[pojiˈd̪əl] پويِيدٙل
شپږ	'six'	[ʃpaʝ] شْپَږ	[ʃpaɡ] شْپَږ	[ʃpiʒ] شْپِږ
ورېځ	'cloud'	[wəɾˈjed͡z] وٙرْيېځ	[wɾez] وْرېځ	[wəˈred͡z] وٙرېځ
ښځه	'woman'	[ˈçəd͡za] ښٙځَه	[ˈxəza] ښٙځَه	[ˈʃəd͡zi] ښٙځِه
اوبه	'water'	[ˈobə] اوبٙه	[ˈubə] اُوبٙه	[ˈobə] اوبٙه

Or the difference in vowels and diphthongs in North Eastern Pashto:

	Meaning	Swat	Peshawar
ودرېږه	'stop' (imperative of دْرېدٙل)	['wəd̪ɾeɡa] وٙدْرېږَه	[ˈod̪ɾeɡa] اودْرېږَه
جنۍ	'girl'	[d͡ʒiˈnəɪ̯] جِنۍ	[d͡ʒiˈnɛ] جِنې

==== Alveolo-palatal fricative ====
Rozi Khan Burki claims that the Ormuri alveolo-palatal fricative [ɕ] and [ʑ] may also be present in Waziri. But Pashto linguists such as Josef Elfenbein, Anna Boyle or Yousaf Khan Jazab have not noted this in Waziri Phonology.

=== Vowels ===
==== Waziri vowels ====
Waziri vowels
[œ]
[ˈpœɾt̪a]

[ɔ]
[d̪əˈpɔːra]

[ɒ]
[bjɒː]

	Front		Central	Back
	Unrounded	Rounded	Central	Back
Close	i			u
Mid	ɛ	œ	ə	ɔ
Near-Open	æ			
Open	a			ɒ

===== Vowel shift =====
Corey Miller notes that the shift does not affect all words.

In the Waziri dialect, [ɑ] in Standard Pashto becomes [ɔː] in northern Waziri and [ɒː] in southern Waziri.

	Meaning	Standard Pashto	N. Wazirwola	S. Wazirwola
ماسْتٙه	'yogurt'	[mɑsˈt̪ə] ماسْتٙه	[mɔːsˈt̪ə] ماسْتٙه	[mɒːsˈt̪ə] ماسْتٙه
پاڼَه	'leaf'	[pɑˈɳa] پاڼَه	[ˈpɔːɳjɛː] پاڼَيه	[ˈpɒːɳjɛː] پاڼَيه

In the Waziri dialect, the stressed [o] in Standard Pashto becomes [œː] and [ɛː]. The [o] in Standard Pashto may also begin with a glide: [jɛ], [wɛː].

	Meaning	Standard Pashto	Wazirwola
لور	'sickle'	[loɾ]	[lœːɾ]
اوړٙه	'flour'	[ˈoɽə]	[ˈɛːɽə]
اوږَه	'shoulder'	[ˈoɡa]	[ˈ(j)ɛʒa]
اوس	'now'	[os]	[wɛːs]

In the Waziri dialect, stressed [u] in Standard Pashto becomes [iː].

	Meaning	Standard Pashto	Wazirwola
مُوږ	'we'	[muɡ]	[miːʒ]
نُوم	'navel'	[num]	[niːm]

When [u] begins a word in Standard Pashto, it can become [jiː] or w[ɛ].

	Meaning	Standard Pashto	Wazirwola
اُوم	'raw'	[um]	[jiːm]
اُوږَه	'garlic'	[ˈuɡa]	[ˈjiːʒa]
اُودٙه	'asleep'	[ˈud̪ə]	[wɜˈd̪ə]

Elfenbein also notes the presence of the near-open vowel [æ].

==== Apridi vowels ====
Apridi vowel
/ɵ/
[ˈpɵɾt̪a]

Apridi has the additional close-mid central rounded vowel [ɵ].

==== Diphthongs in dialects ====
The diphthongs varies according to dialect.

Standard pronunciation	Apridi	Yusupzai	Waziri	Mohmand	Baniswola/Bannuchi	Wanetsi
aɪ	ʌɪ ʌː	e	aɪ		ɑ	a
ˈaɪ	ˈaɪ	ˈe		æɪ	ˈɑːi	ˈa
ˈəɪ	ˈije	ˈəɪ	ˈəɪ ˈe		ˈije	ˈi
oɪ	waɪ	we	oːi œːi		eːi	
uɪ		ui, wi	ˈojə		i	
aw		ao			ow, aːw	
ɑi		ɑe			ˈɑːi	
ɑw		ɑo			oːw	

Yousaf Khan Jazab notes that the diphthong /əɪ/ becomes /oi/ in the Khattak Dialect in the verbal suffix /ئ/, but it remains as the diphthong /əɪ/ in the nominal/adjectival /ۍ/ example: مَړۍ [maˈɽəɪ̯] 'meal'.

=== Nasalisation of vowels ===
Nasalisation in Marwat dialect
'egg' in Marwat dialect (nasalised)
[ãŋˈɡəɪ̯] اَن٘ګۍ

'egg' in Yusapzai dialect (not nasalised)
[haˈɡəɪ̯] هَګۍ

As noted by Yousaf Khan Jazab, the Marwat and Bansiwola dialects have nasalised vowels also. It is also noted in the Waṇetsi/Tarin dialect.

Standard	Marwat	Meaning
بُوی [buɪ̯]	بُویْں [buĩ]	'smell'
هګۍ [haˈɡəɪ̯, həˈɡəɪ̯]	ان٘ګۍ [ãŋˈɡəɪ̯, ə̃ŋˈɡəɪ̯]	'egg'

== Bibliography ==
- Coyle, Dennis (2014-01-01). Placing Wardak Among Pashto Varieties (MA). University of North Dakota.
- David, Anne Boyle (2014). Descriptive Grammar of Pashto and Its Dialects. Walter de Gruyter. ISBN 978-1-61451-303-2.
- Elfenbein, Josef (1997). "Pashto Phonology". In Kaye, Alan S. (ed.). Phonologies of Asia and Africa: Including the Caucasus. Eisenbrauns. pp. 733–760. ISBN 978-1-57506-019-4.
- Jazab, Yousaf Khan (2017). An Ethno-Linguistic Study of the Karlanri Varieties of Pashto. Pashto Academy, University of Peshawar. pp. 69–70. ISBN 9789694181004. OCLC 1001287442.
- Jazab, Yousaf Khan (2020-09-19). "A Diphthong Related Issue in Pashto Script and Its Solution". Pashto. 49 (659). ISSN 0555-8158.
- Tegey, Habibullah; Robson, Barbara (1996). A Reference Grammar of Pashto (PDF). Washington, D.C.: Center for Applied Linguistics.
