= United Nations Security Council Resolution 1623 =

UN Security Council Resolution 1623
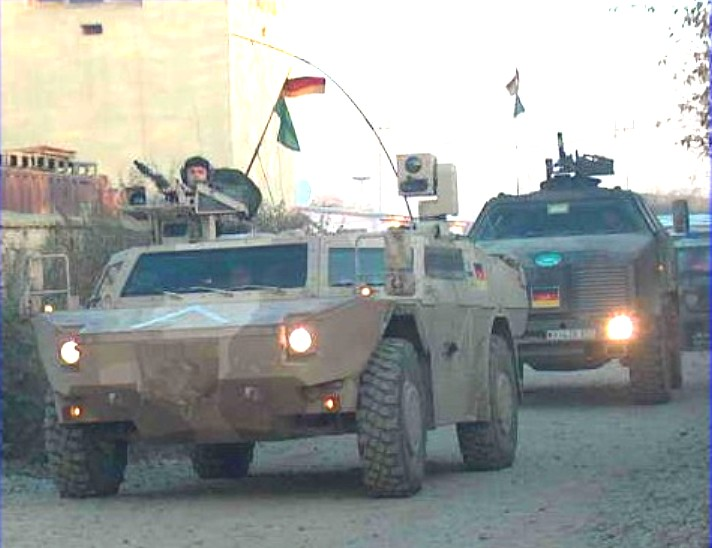
- ISAF units in Afghanistan
- Date: 13 September 2005
- Meeting no.: 5,260
- Code: S/RES/1623 (Document)
- Subject: The situation in Afghanistan
- Voting summary: 15 voted for; None voted against; None abstained
- Result: Adopted

Security Council composition
- Permanent members: China; France; Russia; United Kingdom; United States
- Non-permanent members: Algeria; Argentina; Benin; Brazil; Denmark; Greece; Japan; Philippines; Romania; Tanzania

United Nations Security Council resolution 1623, adopted unanimously on 13 September 2005, after reaffirming all resolutions on the situation in Afghanistan, particularly resolutions 1386 (2001), 1413 (2002), 1444 (2002), 1510 (2003) and 1563 (2004), and resolutions 1368 (2001) and 1373 (2001) on terrorism, the council extended the authorisation of the International Security Assistance Force (ISAF) until mid-October 2006.

== Resolution ==
=== Observations ===
The security council recognised that the responsibility for providing security and law and order throughout Afghanistan resided with Afghans themselves. It recalled the Bonn Agreement and its provision for the progressive expansion of ISAF to other areas beyond Kabul. The council also stressed the importance of the expansion of central government authority, security sector reform and comprehensive disarmament, demobilisation and combating the narcotics trade. There were concerns that the Bonn Agreement could not be fully implemented due to the security situation in parts of the country.

The resolution welcomed the co-operation of the Afghan Transitional Administration and the intention of ISAF and Operation Enduring Freedom to assist with national elections. It also appreciated Italy for taking lead of ISAF in place of Turkey, and commended nations that had contributed to Eurocorps. The Council determined the situation in Afghanistan to be a threat to international peace and security.

=== Acts ===
Acting under Chapter VII of the United Nations Charter, the council expanded the mandate of ISAF for a period of twelve months beyond 13 October 2005. ISAF was asked to work with the transitional administration and its successors, the Special Representative of the Secretary-General and Operation Enduring Freedom.

States participating in the force were authorised to use all necessary measures to fulfil the mandate, while other member states were asked to contribute personnel and resources to the operation. Finally, the ISAF leadership was requested to provide quarterly reports on the implementation of its mandate.

== See also ==
- War in Afghanistan (1978–present)
- List of United Nations Security Council Resolutions 1601 to 1700 (2005–2006)
- United Nations Assistance Mission in Afghanistan
- War in Afghanistan (2001–present)
