= Operation Mar Lewe =

Security Assistant force operation

- Part of the War in Afghanistan (2001–2021)
Date	29 May – 1 June 2009
Location	Yatimchay, Helmand Province, Afghanistan
Result	British/ANA victory.

Belligerents
United Kingdom; Islamic Republic of Afghanistan	(Afghanistan) Taliban

Commanders and leaders
(United Kingdom) Lieutenant Colonel Charlie Calder	Unknown

Strength
Unknown	Unknown

Casualties and losses
2 killed Unknown wounded	Unknown

Operation Mar Lewe was a three-day International Security Assistance Force operation started in the early hours of Friday 29 May 2009 when the Taliban were attacked as the Afghan Security Forces and British Army struck at enemy positions around the village of Yatimchay, 6 kilometres (3.7 mi) south of Musa Qaleh, Helmand Province, Afghanistan. "Mar Lewe" is Pashto for "snake wolf".

The British Army forces were from the 2nd Battalion Royal Regiment of Fusiliers, a well trained, operationally hardened Light Role Infantry Battalion.
