= Norbert van Heyst =

German general

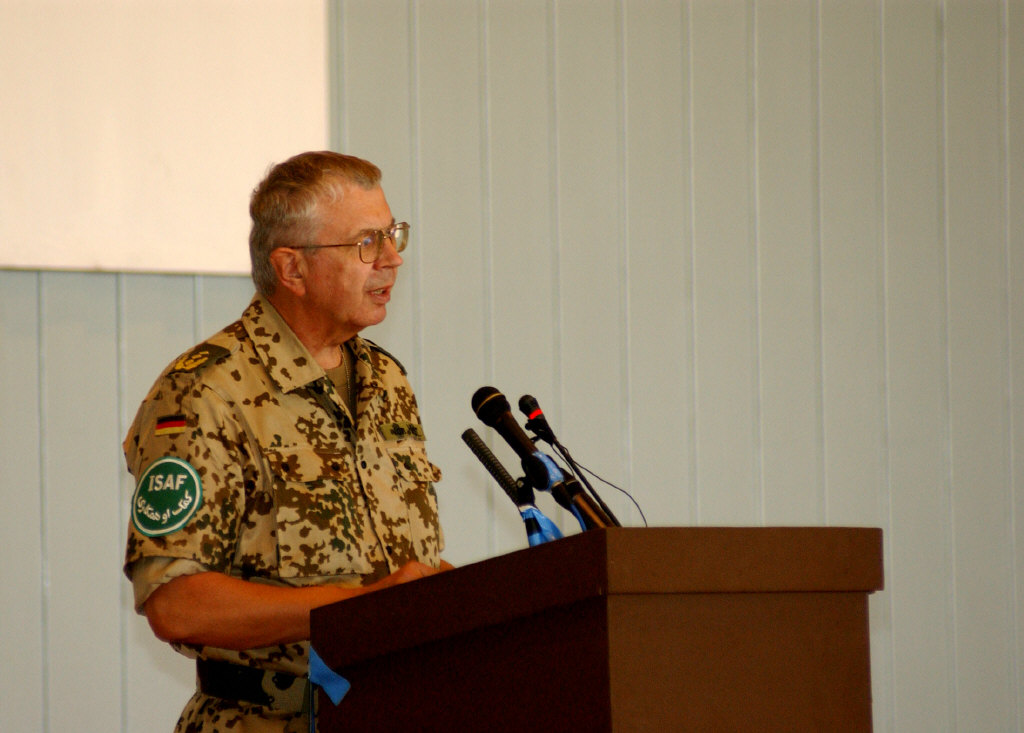
Bundeswehr General Norbert van Heyst in 2003. (NATO Photos)

Lieutenant General Norbert van Heyst (born 24 June 1944, in Rengsdorf) was a senior commander in the German Army.

He entered the army as an Offizieranwärter (Officer candidate) in the signals troops in April 1963. In early 2003 he was appointed the commander of the International Security Assistance Force. On August 11, 2003, control of ISAF was handed to NATO with Van Heyst being replaced by Lieutenant General Götz Gliemeroth, also of Germany. Van Heyst retired on 1 July 2005.

Military offices
Preceded by Hilmi Akin Zorlu	Commander of the International Security Assistance Force; 10 February – 11 August 2003	Succeeded by Götz Gliemeroth
