= International Security Assistance Force =

NATO-led security mission in Afghanistan from 2001–2014

- Official logo of the ISAF
- Active: 20 December 2001 – 28 December 2014
- Country: See list
- Allegiance: NATO
- Size: 130,000 (at peak in 2012)
- Part of: Allied Joint Force Command Brunssum American contingent responsible to: United States Central Command; MacDill Air Force Base, Florida, U.S.
- Headquarters: Kabul, Afghanistan
- Mottos: "Assistance and Cooperation"; Dari: کمک و همکاری Kumak u Hamkāri; Pashto: کمک او همکاري Kumak aw Hamkāri
- Engagements: War in Afghanistan

Commanders
- Notable commanders: Gen. John F. Campbell (2014)

Insignia
- Flags

The International Security Assistance Force (ISAF) was a multinational allied military mission in Afghanistan from 2001 to 2014. It was established by United Nations Security Council (UNSC) Resolution 1386 pursuant to the Bonn Agreement, which outlined the creation of a permanent Afghan government following the United States invasion in October 2001. ISAF's primary goal was to train the Afghan National Security Forces (ANSF) and assist Afghanistan in rebuilding key government institutions; it gradually took part in the broader war in Afghanistan against the Taliban insurgency.

ISAF's initial mandate was to secure the Afghan capital of Kabul and its surrounding area against opposition forces to facilitate the formation of the Afghan Transitional Administration headed by Hamid Karzai. In 2003, NATO took command of the mission at the request of the UN and Afghan government, marking its first deployment outside Europe and North America. Shortly thereafter, the UN Security Council expanded ISAF's mission to provide and maintain security beyond the capital region. ISAF incrementally broadened its operations in four stages, and by 2006 took responsibility for the entire country; ISAF subsequently engaged in more intensive combat in southern and eastern Afghanistan.

At its peak between 2010 and 2012, ISAF had 400 military bases throughout Afghanistan (compared to 300 for the ANSF) and roughly 130,000 troops. Forty-two countries contributed troops to ISAF, including all 30 members of NATO. Personnel contributions varied greatly throughout the mission: Canada was the largest contributor initially, though by 2010 the United States accounted for most troops, followed by the United Kingdom, Turkey, Germany, France, and Italy; Georgia, Denmark, Norway, and Estonia were among the largest contributors per capita. The intensity of the combat faced by participating countries varied greatly, with the U.S. sustaining the most casualties overall, while British, Danish, Estonian, Georgian, and U.S. forces suffered the most deaths for their population; Georgian Armed Forces had the highest per-capita casualty rate among coalition members.

Under its ultimate aim of transitioning security responsibilities to Afghan forces, ISAF ceased combat operations and was disbanded in December 2014. Several troops remained to serve a supporting and advisory role as part of its successor organization, the Resolute Support Mission.

== Jurisdiction ==
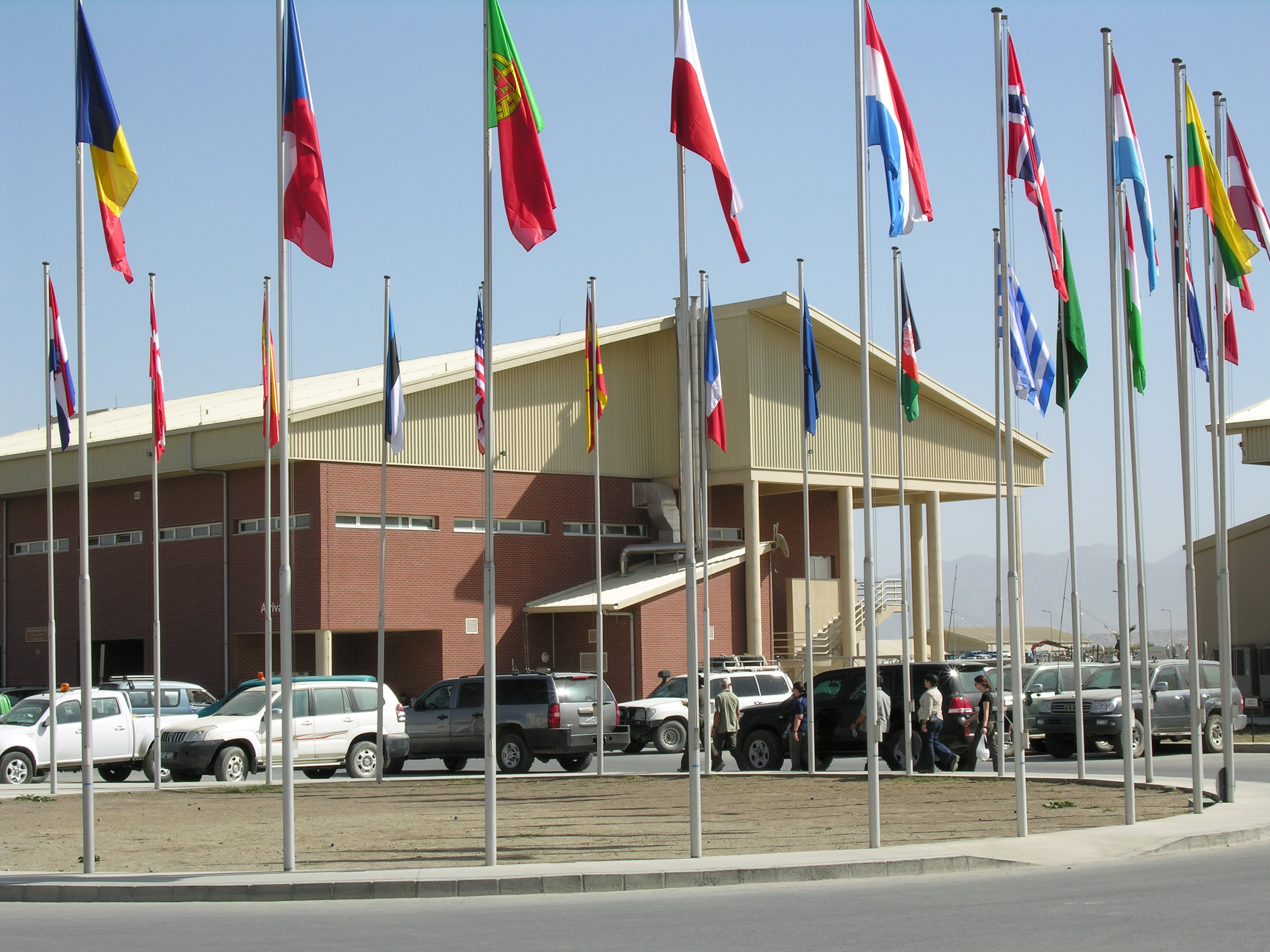
ISAF's military terminal at Kabul International Airport in September 2010

For almost two years, the ISAF mandate did not go beyond the boundaries of Kabul. According to General Norbert Van Heyst, such a deployment would require at least ten thousand additional soldiers. The responsibility for security throughout the whole of Afghanistan was to be given to the newly reconstituted Afghan National Army. However, on 13 October 2003, the Security Council voted unanimously to expand the ISAF mission beyond Kabul with Resolution 1510. Shortly thereafter, Canadian Prime Minister Jean Chrétien said that Canadian soldiers (nearly half the entire force at that time) would not deploy outside Kabul.

On 24 October 2003, the German Bundestag voted to send German troops to the region of Kunduz. Approximately 230 additional soldiers were deployed to that region, marking the first time that ISAF soldiers operated outside of Kabul. After the Afghan parliamentary election in September 2005 the Canadian base Camp Julien in Kabul closed, and the remaining Canadian assets were moved to Kandahar as part of Operation Enduring Freedom in preparation for a significant deployment in January 2006. On 31 July 2006, the NATO‑led International Security Assistance Force assumed command of the south of the country, ISAF Stage 3, and by 5 October, also of the east of Afghanistan, ISAF Stage 4.

ISAF was mandated by UN Security Council Resolutions 1386, 1413, 1444, 1510, 1563, 1623, 1659, 1707, 1776, and 1917 (2010). The last of these extended the mandate of ISAF to 23 March 2011.

== History ==
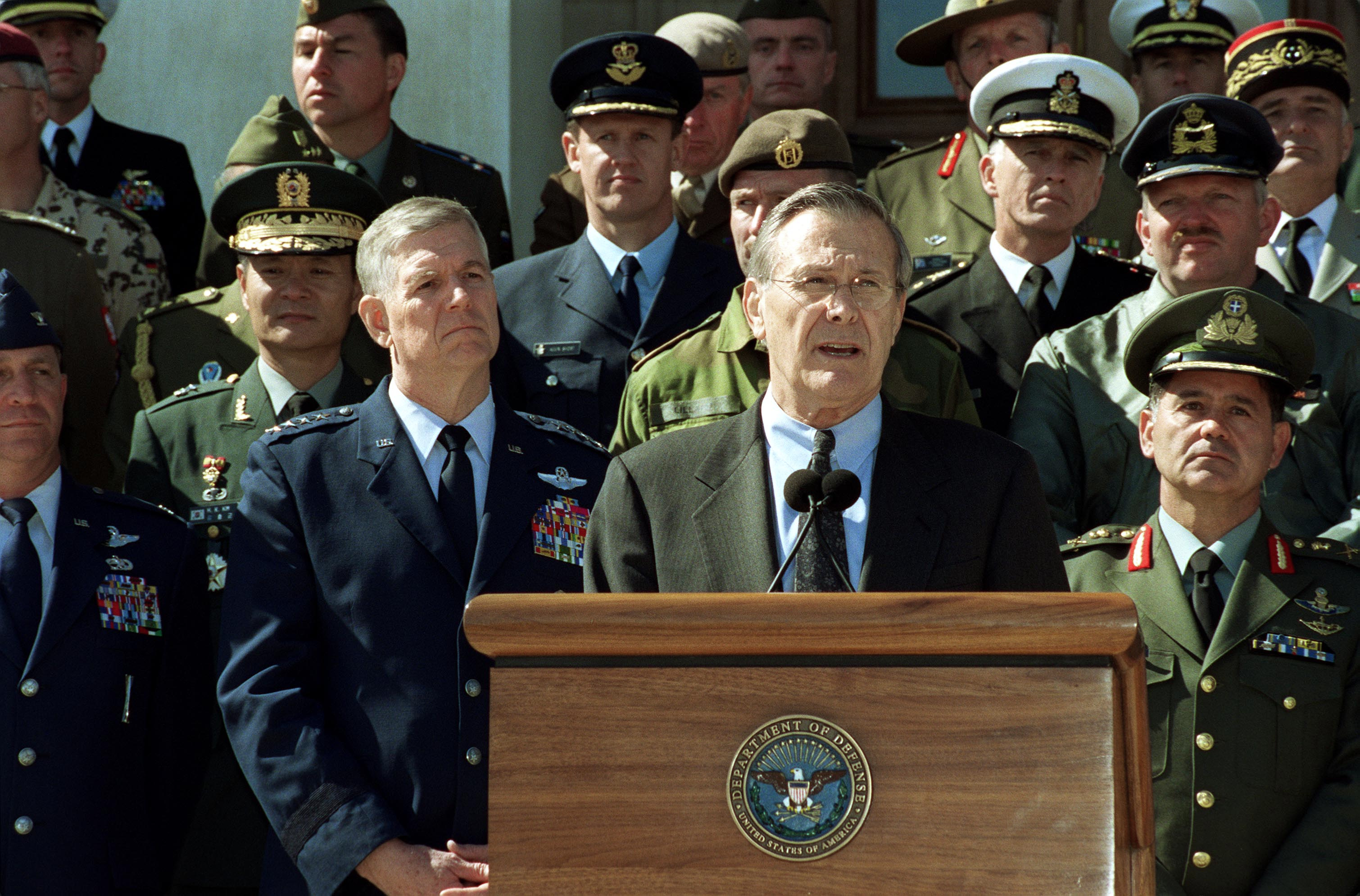
U.S. Secretary of Defense Donald Rumsfeld with Chairman of the Joint Chiefs of Staff General Richard B. Myers and joined by military representatives from 29 countries of the worldwide coalition on the war against terrorism, at The Pentagon on 11 March 2002

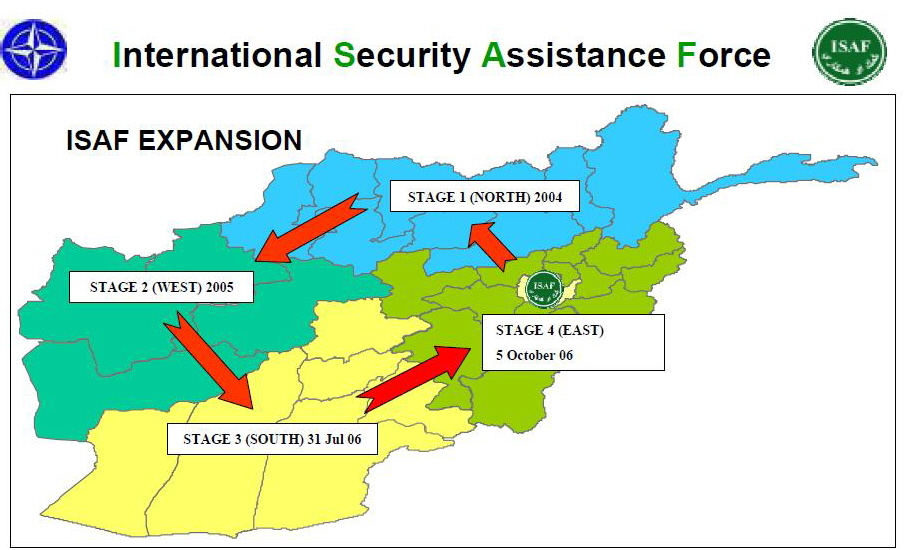
Geographic depiction of the four ISAF stages (January 2009)

The initial ISAF headquarters (AISAF) was based on 3rd UK Mechanised Division, led at the time by Major General John McColl. This force arrived in December 2001. Until ISAF expanded beyond Kabul, the force consisted of a roughly division-level headquarters and one brigade covering the capital, the Kabul Multinational Brigade. The brigade was composed of three battle groups and was in charge of the tactical command of deployed troops. ISAF headquarters served as the operational control center of the mission.

Eighteen countries were contributors to the force in February 2002, and it was expected to grow to 5,000 soldiers. Turkey assumed command of ISAF in June 2002 (Major General Hilmi Akin Zorlu, chief of Turkish Army Plans and Policy). During this period, the number of Turkish troops increased from about 100 to 1,300. In November 2002, ISAF consisted of 4,650 troops from over 20 countries. Around 1,200 German troops served in the force alongside 250 Dutch soldiers operating as part of a German-led battalion. Turkey relinquished command in February 2003 and assumed command for a second time in February 2005. Turkey's area of operations expanded into the rugged west of Afghanistan. The expansion of its zone of activities saw ISAF troops operating in 50 percent of Afghanistan, double its previous responsibility.

On 10 February 2003, German Lieutenant General Norbert van Heyst took command of ISAF, with Brigadier General Bertholee of the Netherlands serving as Deputy. The mission HQ was formed from HQ I. German/Dutch Corps (1GNC), including staff from the UK, Italy, Turkey, Norway, and others. In March 2003, ISAF was composed of 4,700 troops from 28 countries. Service in ISAF by NATO personnel from 1 June 2003. onward earns the right to wear the NATO Medal if a service member meets a defined set of tour length requirements.

In Kabul on 7 June 2003, a taxi packed with explosives rammed a bus carrying German ISAF personnel, killing four soldiers and wounding 29 others; one Afghan bystander was killed and 10 Afghan bystanders were wounded. The 33 German soldiers, after months on duty in Kabul, were en route to the Kabul International Airport for their flight home to Germany. At the time, German soldiers made up more than 40 percent of ISAF troops.

ISAF command originally rotated among different nations every six months. However, there was tremendous difficulty securing new lead nations. To solve the problem, the command was turned over indefinitely to NATO on 11 August 2003. This marked NATO's first deployment outside Europe or North America.

- In February 2002, South Korea sent a medical contingent of 99 soldiers.
- Between February and July 2002, Portugal sent a sanitary team and an air team to ISAF.
- A study by CARE International in the summer of 2003 reported that Kosovo had one peacekeeper to 48 people, East Timor one for every 86, while Afghanistan has just one for every 5,380 people.

=== Stage 1: to the north – completed October 2004 ===
- On 11 August 2003, NATO took command of ISAF, which consisted of 5,000 troops from more than 30 countries. About 90 percent of the force was contributed by NATO nations. By far the largest single contingent, 1,950 were Canadian. About 2,000 German troops were involved, and Romania had about 400 troops at the time.
- The first ISAF rotation under the command of NATO was led by Lieutenant General Goetz Gliemeroth, Germany, with Canadian Army Major General Andrew Leslie as his deputy. Canada originally had been slated to take over command of ISAF on 11 August 2003.
- 13 October 2003: Resolution 1510 passed by the UN opened the way to a wider role for ISAF to support the government of Afghanistan beyond Kabul.
- In December 2003, the North Atlantic Council authorized the Supreme Allied Commander, Europe, General James Jones, to initiate the expansion of ISAF by taking over command of the German-led PRT in Kunduz. The other eight PRTs operating in Afghanistan in 2003 remained under the command of Operation Enduring Freedom, the continuing U.S.‑led military operation in Afghanistan. On 31 December 2003, the military component of the Kunduz PRT was placed under ISAF command as a pilot project and the first step in the expansion of the mission. Six months later, on 28 June 2004, at the Summit meeting of the NATO Heads of State and Government in Istanbul, NATO announced that it would establish four other provincial reconstruction teams in the north of the country: in Mazar-i-Sharif, Meymana, Feyzabad and Baghlan. After the completion of Stage 1 the ISAF's area of operations then covered about 3,600 square kilometers in the north, and the mission was able to influence security in nine Northern provinces of the country.
- As late as November 2003, the entire ISAF force had only three helicopters.
- On 9 February 2004, Lieutenant General Rick Hillier of Canada took command, with Major General Werner Korte of Germany as deputy. During this time frame, Canada was the largest contributor to the ISAF force, providing 2,000 troops.
- In May 2004, Turkey sent three helicopters and 56 flight and maintenance personnel to work in ISAF.
- In July 2004, Portugal sent 24 soldiers and one C‑130 Hercules cargo plane to assist ISAF.
- On 7 August 2004, General Jean-Louis Py, commander of Eurocorps, took command of ISAF. Eurocorps contributors deploying to Afghanistan included France, Germany, Spain, Belgium, and Luxembourg. Canada reduced its forces to about 800 personnel.
- In September 2004, a Spanish battalion of about 800 personnel arrived to provide the ISAF Quick Reaction Force, and an Italian Army battalion of up to 1,000 troops arrived to provide the in‑theater Operational Reserve Force. With a force of 100, Georgia became the first Commonwealth of Independent States country to send an operational force to Afghanistan.
- Stage 1 (North) was completed in October 2004, under the Regional Command of Germany.

=== Stage 2: to the west – completed September 2005 ===
- In February 2005, General Ethem Erdagi of Turkey took command
- On 10 February 2005, NATO announced that ISAF would be expanded into the west of Afghanistan. This process began on 31 May 2006, when ISAF took command of two additional Provincial Reconstruction Teams in the provinces of Herat and Farah, and of a Forward Support Base (a logistic base) in Herat. At the beginning of September, two additional ISAF-led PRTs in the west became operational, one in Chaghcharan, capital of Ghor province, and one in Qala-e-Naw, capital of Baghdis province; this completed ISAF's expansion into the west. The extended ISAF mission led a total of nine PRTs in the north and the west, providing security assistance in 50 percent of Afghanistan's territory.
- As the area of responsibility was increased, ISAF also took command of an increasing number of PRTs, to improve security and facilitate reconstruction outside the capital. The first nine PRTs (and lead nations) were based at Baghlan (Netherlands, then Hungary, in October 2006), Chaghcharan (Lithuania), Farah (U.S.), Fayzabad (Germany), Herat (Italy), Kunduz (Germany), Mazar-i-Sharif (U.K., then Denmark and Sweden, then Sweden and Finland), Maymana (U.K., then Norway), Qala‑e Naw (Spain).
- In May 2005, ISAF Stage 2 took place, doubling the size of the territory for which ISAF was responsible. The new area was the former U.S. Regional Command West consisting of Badghis, Farah, Ghor, and Herat Provinces.
- On 5 August 2005, Italian General Mauro del Vecchio assumed command of ISAF. During 2005, Italy commanded four multinational military operations: in Afghanistan, Bosnia, Kosovo and Albania.
- In September 2005, ISAF Stage 2 was completed under the Regional Command of Italy. The Alliance also temporarily deployed 2,000 additional troops to Afghanistan to support the 18 September provincial and parliamentary elections.
- On 27 January 2006, it was announced in the British Parliament that ISAF would replace U.S.; Operation Enduring Freedom troops in Helmand Province. The British 16th Air Assault Brigade became the core of the force in Helmand Province.
- In February 2006, the Netherlands expanded its troop contribution with an extra 1,400 soldiers.
- On 22 May 2006, a British Army WAH-64 Apache gunship fired a Hellfire missile to destroy a French armored vehicle that had been disabled during a firefight with Taliban forces in North Helmand province the previous day, as it had been determined that attempting to recover the vehicle would have been too dangerous. This was the first time U.K. Apaches had opened fire in a hostile theater and was, after a fashion, the WAH-64's first "combat kill."

=== Stage 3: to the south – completed July 2006 ===
- On 8 December 2005, meeting at NATO Headquarters in Brussels, the Allied Foreign Ministers endorsed a plan that paved the way for an expanded ISAF role and presence in Afghanistan. The first element of this plan was the expansion of ISAF to the south in 2006, also known as Stage 3. After this stage, the ISAF assumed command of the southern region of Afghanistan from U.S.‑led Coalition forces, expanding its area of operations to cover an additional six provinces – Day Kundi, Helmand, Kandahar, Nimroz, Uruzgan, and Zabul – and taking on command of four additional PRTs. The expanded ISAF led a total of 13 PRTs in the north, west, and south, covering some three-quarters of Afghanistan's territory. The number of ISAF forces in the country also increased significantly, from about 10,000 before the expansion to about 20,000 after.
- On 4 May 2006, United Kingdom General David Richards assumed command of the ISAF IX force in Afghanistan. The mission was led by the Allied Rapid Reaction Corps.
- On 31 July 2006, Stage 3 was completed; the NATO-led International Security Assistance Force also assumed command in six provinces of the south. Regional Command South was established at Kandahar. Led by Canada, 8,000 soldiers were positioned there.
- With the Taliban regrouping, especially in its birthplace of Kandahar province bordering Pakistan, NATO launched its biggest offensive against the guerrillas on the weekend of 2 and 3 September 2006 (Operation Medusa). NATO reported that it had killed more than 250 Taliban fighters, but the Taliban stated that NATO casualty estimates were exaggerated.
- On 7 September 2006, a British soldier was killed and six were wounded when their patrol strayed into an unmarked minefield in Helmand, the major opium poppy-growing province west of Kandahar.
- On 28 September 2006, the North Atlantic Council gave final authorization for the NATO-led International Security Assistance Force (NATO-ISAF) to expand its area of operations to 14 additional provinces in the east of Afghanistan, boosting NATO's presence and role in the country. With this further expansion, NATO-ISAF assisted the Government of Afghanistan in providing security throughout the entire country. The expansion saw the NATO-ISAF controlling 32,000 troops from 37 countries, although by this stage, the alliance was struggling to find extra troops to hold off a spiraling Taliban-led insurgency in the volatile south.

=== Stage 4: ISAF takes responsibility for the entire country – completed October 2006 ===
- On 5 October 2006, ISAF implemented the final stage of its expansion by taking over command of the international military forces in eastern Afghanistan from the U.S.‑led Coalition. In addition to expanding the Alliance's area of operations, the revised operational plan also paved the way for a greater ISAF role in the country. This includes the deployment of ISAF Operational Mentoring and Liaison Teams (OMLTs) to Afghan National Army units at various levels of command.
- 10,000 more Coalition troops moved under NATO command. 31,000 ISAF troops were now in Afghanistan and 8,000 U.S.; troops continued separate training and counter-terrorism activities.
- On 21 October 2006, the Canadian government expressed frustration over the unwillingness of some European NATO members to deploy troops to help fight mounting Taliban resistance in the south.

=== ISAF after Stage 4: October 2006 to 2014 ===
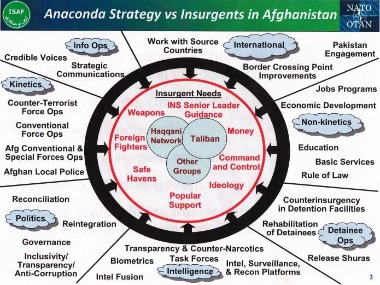
Anaconda Strategy vs the insurgents as of 20 October 2010

- In November 2006, a study by the Joint Co-ordinating and Monitoring Board, made up of the Afghan government, its key foreign backers, and the U.N, suggested that more than 3,700 people died from January to November 2006. The majority of the dead appeared to be insurgents, but it was estimated that 1,000 civilians had been killed that year, along with members of the Afghan National Army, ISAF, and U.S. Operation Enduring Freedom forces.
- On 28–29 November 2006, there was a NATO summit at Riga, Latvia. Combat curbs were the most contentious issue at the two-day summit in Latvia, following tension over the reluctance of France, Germany, Spain, and Italy to send troops to southern Afghanistan. Countries agreeing to ease the restrictions on deployment against the Taliban insurgency included the Dutch, Romanians, and smaller nations such as Slovenia and Luxembourg. France, Germany, Spain, and Italy agreed to send help to trouble zones outside their areas, but only in emergencies. The summit also saw several countries offer additional troops and training teams. France agreed to send more helicopters and aircraft. NATO commanders said they believed they could move an additional 2,500 troops around the country after some smaller members relaxed their mission conditions.
- On 15 December 2006, ISAF started a new offensive, Operation Baaz Tsuka (Falcon's Summit), against the Taliban in the Panjaway valley in Kandahar province.
- On 4 February 2007, U.S. General Dan K. McNeill replaced British General David Richards as commander of ISAF. Analysts reported that he planned to place a heavier emphasis on fighting than on peace deals. Meanwhile, observers and commanders were expecting a new Taliban "spring offensive," and NATO commanders asked for more troops.
- On 6 March 2007, NATO-ISAF launched Operation Achilles, an offensive to bring security to northern Helmand and set the conditions for meaningful development that would fundamentally improve the quality of life for Afghans in the area. The operation eventually involved more than 4,500 NATO troops and nearly 1,000 Afghan soldiers in Helmand province, according to the alliance. It focused on improving security in areas where Taliban extremists, narco-traffickers, and other elements were trying to destabilize the government of Afghanistan, and on empowering village elders. The overarching purpose was to assist the government in improving its ability to begin reconstruction and economic development in the area. Strategically, the goal was also to enable the government to begin the Kajaki hydro-energy project.
- On 2 June 2008, General David D. McKiernan, U.S. Army, assumed command of ISAF.As of January 2009 its troops numbered around 55,100. There were troops from 26 NATO, 10 partner and two non-NATO/non-partner countries,
- On 6–7 February 2009, U.K, forces mounted Operation Diesel raid in Helmand province.
- On 27 April – 19 May 2009, ISAF launched Operations Zafar and Zafar 2 in the Helmand Province. Operation Zafar lasted one week and Operation Zafar 2 lasted four days. Both operations were in preparation for Operation Panther's Claw.
- On 29 May 2009, ISAF launched Operation Mar Lewe around the village of Yatimchay, six kilometers (3.7 mi) south of Musa Qaleh in Helmand Province. Operation Mar Lewe lasted three days. "Mar Lewe" is Pashto for "snake wolf".

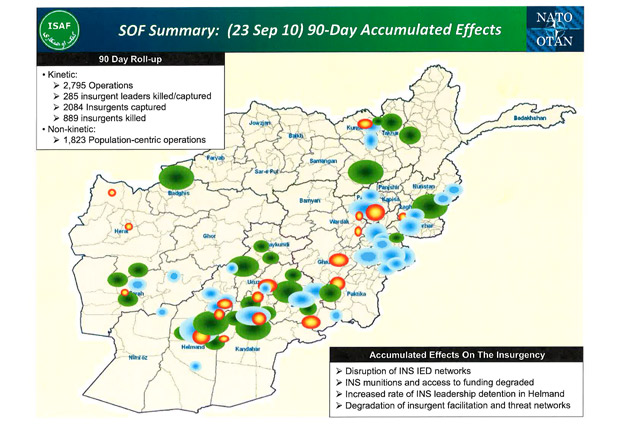
SOF 90‑Day Accumulated effect (23 Sep 10).

- On 15 June 2009, General Stanley A. McChrystal, U.S. Army, assumed command of NATO forces.
- On 19 June 2009, ISAF launched Operation Panther's Claw to secure control of various canal and river crossings in Helmand Province and to establish a lasting ISAF presence in an area described by Lt. Col. Richardson as "one of the main Taliban strongholds" ahead of the 2009 Afghan presidential election.
- On 2 July 2009, ISAF launched Operation Strike of the Sword or Operation Khanjar in Helmand Province. This operation was the largest U.S. Marine offensive since the battle of Fallujah, Iraq – Operation Phantom Fury in 2004.
- Beginning in 2010 the Afghanistan Mission Network became the primary information-sharing platform for all troops in Afghanistan in support of General McChrystal's counterinsurgency campaign.
- On 23 June 2010, Lieutenant General Sir Nick Parker, British Army, former deputy commander of ISAF, assumed interim command after the resignation of General McChrystal.
- On 4 July 2010, General David Petraeus, U.S. Army, assumed command of NATO forces; Petraeus was formally approved by the United States Senate to replace McChrystal on 30 June 2010.

Colombia had planned to deploy around 100 soldiers in spring 2009. These forces were expected to be de-mining experts. General Freddy Padilla de Leon announced to CBS News that operators of Colombia's Special Forces Brigade were scheduled to be deployed to Afghanistan in either August or September 2009. However, the Colombians were not listed as part of the force as of June 2011.

Three NATO states announced withdrawal plans beginning in 2010. Canada in 2011, Poland, in 2012, and the United Kingdom in 2010. Between 1 July 2014, and August, Regional Command Capital and Regional Command West were re-designated Train Advise and Assist Command Capital (TAAC Capital) and TAAC West. The United States ended combat operations in Afghanistan in December 2014. Sizable advisory forces would remain to train and mentor Afghan National Security Forces, and NATO will continue operating under the Resolute Support Mission. ISAF Joint Command, in its final deployment provided by Headquarters XVIII Airborne Corps, ceased operations ahead of the end of the NATO combat mission on 8 December 2014.

=== Security and reconstruction ===
From 2006, the insurgency by the Taliban intensified, especially in the southern Pashtun parts of the country, areas that were the Taliban's original power base in the mid‑1990s. After ISAF took over command of the south on 31 July 2006, British, Dutch, Canadian, and Danish ISAF soldiers in the provinces of Helmand, Uruzgan, and Kandahar came under almost daily attack. British commanders said that the fighting for them was the fiercest since the Korean War, 50 years previously. In an article, BBC reporter Alastair Leithead, embedded with the British forces, called it "Deployed to Afghanistan's hell."

Because of the security situation in the south, ISAF commanders asked member countries to send more troops. On 19 October, the Dutch government decided to send more troops because of increasing attacks by suspected Taliban on their Task Force Uruzgan, making it difficult to complete the reconstruction work that they sought to accomplish.

Derogatory alternative acronyms for the ISAF were created by critics, including "I Saw Americans Fighting," "I Suck at Fighting," and "In Sandals and Flip Flops."

=== The illegal opium economy ===
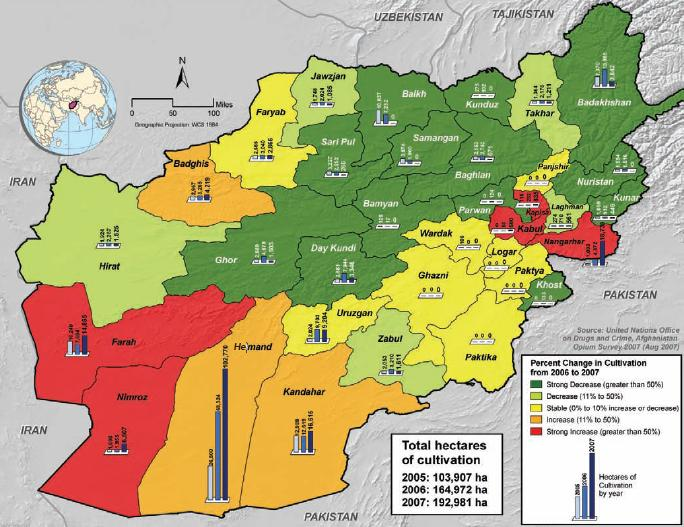
Opium production levels for 2005–2007

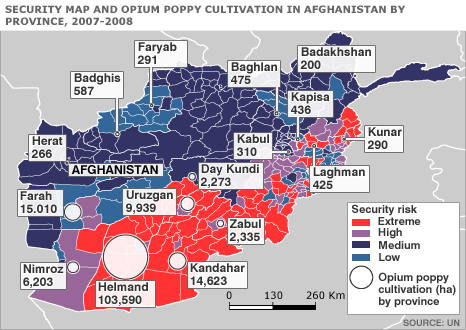
Regional security risks of opium poppy cultivation in 2007–2008.

Before October 2008, ISAF had only served an indirect role in fighting the illegal opium economy in Afghanistan through shared intelligence with the Afghan government, protection of Afghan poppy crop eradication units, and helping in the coordination and the implementation of the country's counter-narcotics policy. For example, Dutch soldiers used military force to protect eradication units that came under attack.

Crop eradication affected the poorest farmers who have no economic alternatives on which to fall back. Without alternatives, these farmers no longer can feed their families, causing anger, frustration, and social protest. Thus, being associated with this counterproductive drug policy, ISAF soldiers on the ground found it difficult to gain the support of the local population.

Though problematic for NATO, this indirect role allowed NATO to avoid the opposition of the local population who depended on the poppy fields for their livelihood. In October 2008, NATO altered its position to curb the financing of insurgency by the Taliban. Drug laboratories and drug traders became the targets, and not the poppy fields themselves. To satisfy France, Italy and Germany, the deal involved the participation in an anti-drug campaign only of willing NATO member countries; the campaign was to be short-lived and with the cooperation of the Afghans.

On 10 October 2008, during a news conference, after an informal meeting of NATO Defense Ministers in Budapest, Hungary, NATO Spokesman James Appathurai said:

... about counter-narcotics, based on the request of the Afghan government, consistent with the appropriate U.N. Security Council Resolutions, under the existing operational plan, ISAF can act in concert with the Afghans against facilities and facilitators supporting the insurgency, subject to the authorization of respective nations... The idea of a review is, indeed, envisioned for an upcoming meeting.

=== Military and civilian casualties ===
ISAF military casualties, and the civilian casualties caused by the war and Coalition/ISAF friendly fire, became a major political issue, both in Afghanistan and in the troop-contributing nations. Increasing civilian casualties threatened the stability of President Hamid Karzai's government. Consequently, effective from 2 July 2009, Coalition air and ground combat operations were ordered to take steps to minimize Afghan civilian casualties in accordance with a tactical directive issued by General Stanley A. McChrystal, USA, the commander of the International Security Assistance Force in Afghanistan.

Another issue over the years has been numerous 'insider' attacks involving Afghan soldiers opening fire on ISAF soldiers. While these diminished, in part due to the planned ending of combat operations on 31 December 2014, they continued to occur, albeit at a lower frequency. On 5 August 2014, a gunman believed to have been an Afghan soldier opened fire on several international soldiers, killing a U.S. general, Harold J. Greene, and wounding about 15 officers and soldiers, including a German brigadier general and several U.S. soldiers, at a training academy near Kabul.

== ISAF command structure as of 2011 ==
Throughout the four different regional stages of ISAF, the number of Provincial Reconstruction Teams (PRTs) grew. The expansion of ISAF, to November 2006, to all provinces of the country brought the total number of PRTs to twenty-five. The twenty-fifth PRT, at Wardak, was established that month and was led by Turkey. Allied Joint Force Command Brunssum, at Brunssum, the Netherlands, was ISAF's superior NATO headquarters. The headquarters of ISAF was located in Kabul. In October 2010, there were 6 Regional Commands, each with subordinate Task Forces and Provincial Reconstruction Teams. The lower strength numbers of the ISAF forces were as of 6 October 2008. The numbers also reflected the situation in the country. The north and west were relatively calm, while ISAF and Afghan forces in the south and east came under almost daily attack. In December 2014 the force reportedly numbered 18,636 from 48 states.

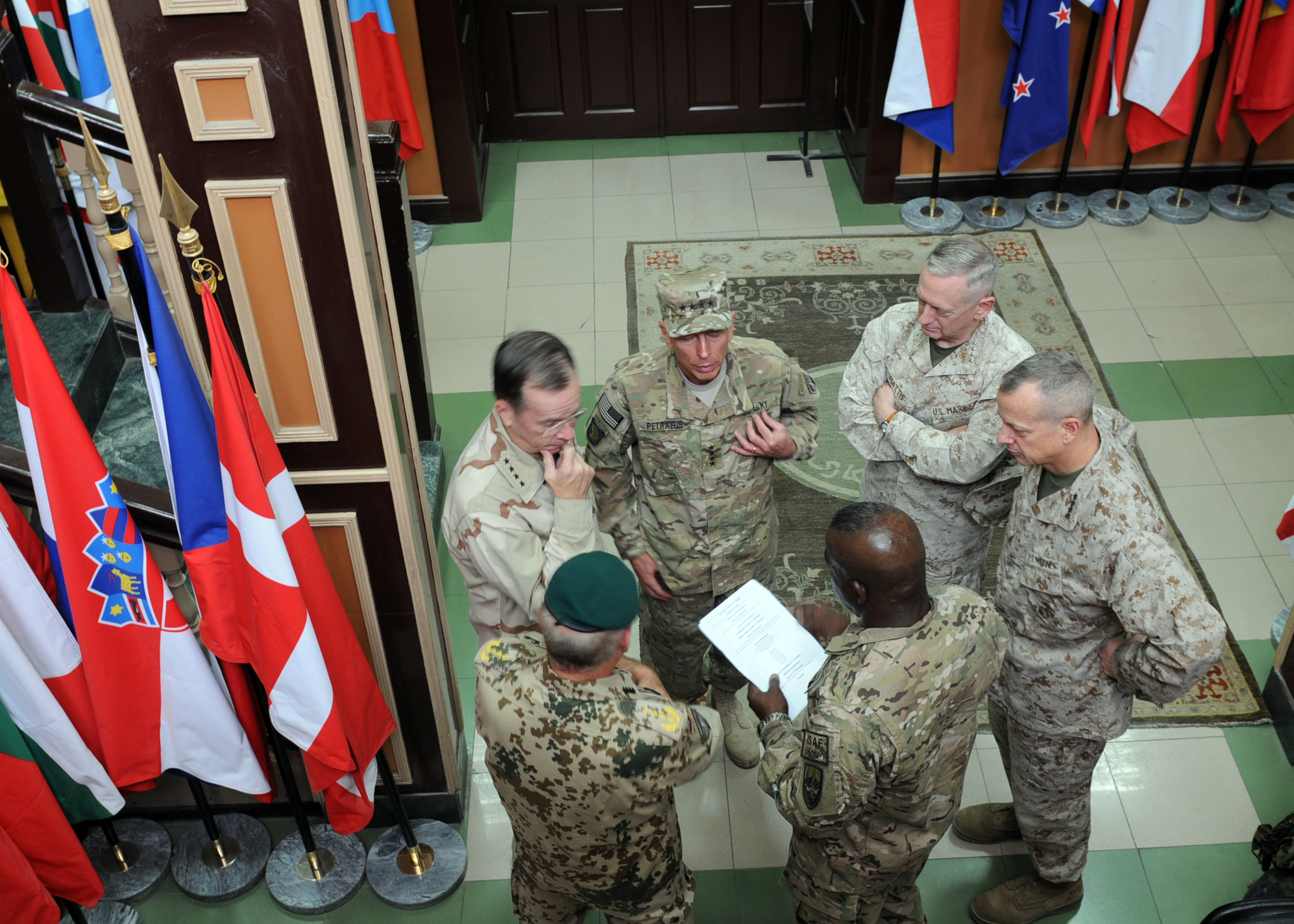
Kabul; Clockwise, Michael Mullen, David Petraeus, James Mattis, John Allen, Marvin L. Hill and German Army Gen. Wolf-Dieter Langheld inside the ISAF headquarters in Kabul.

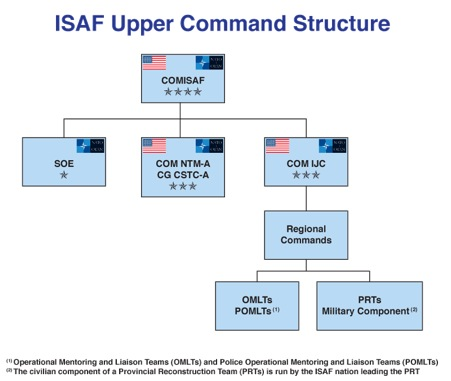

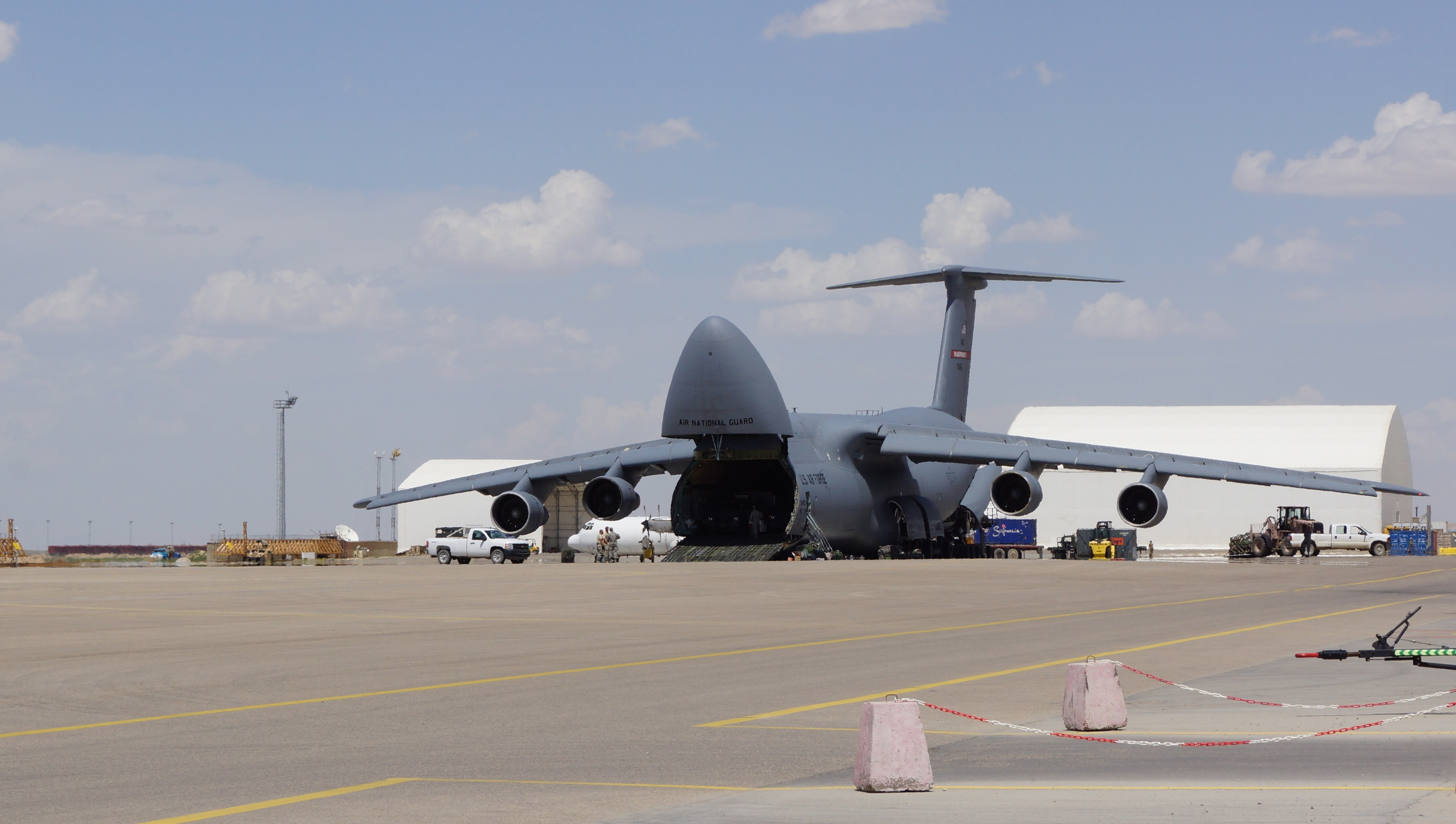
Camp Marmal in Mazar-i-Sharif, headquarters of Regional Command North.

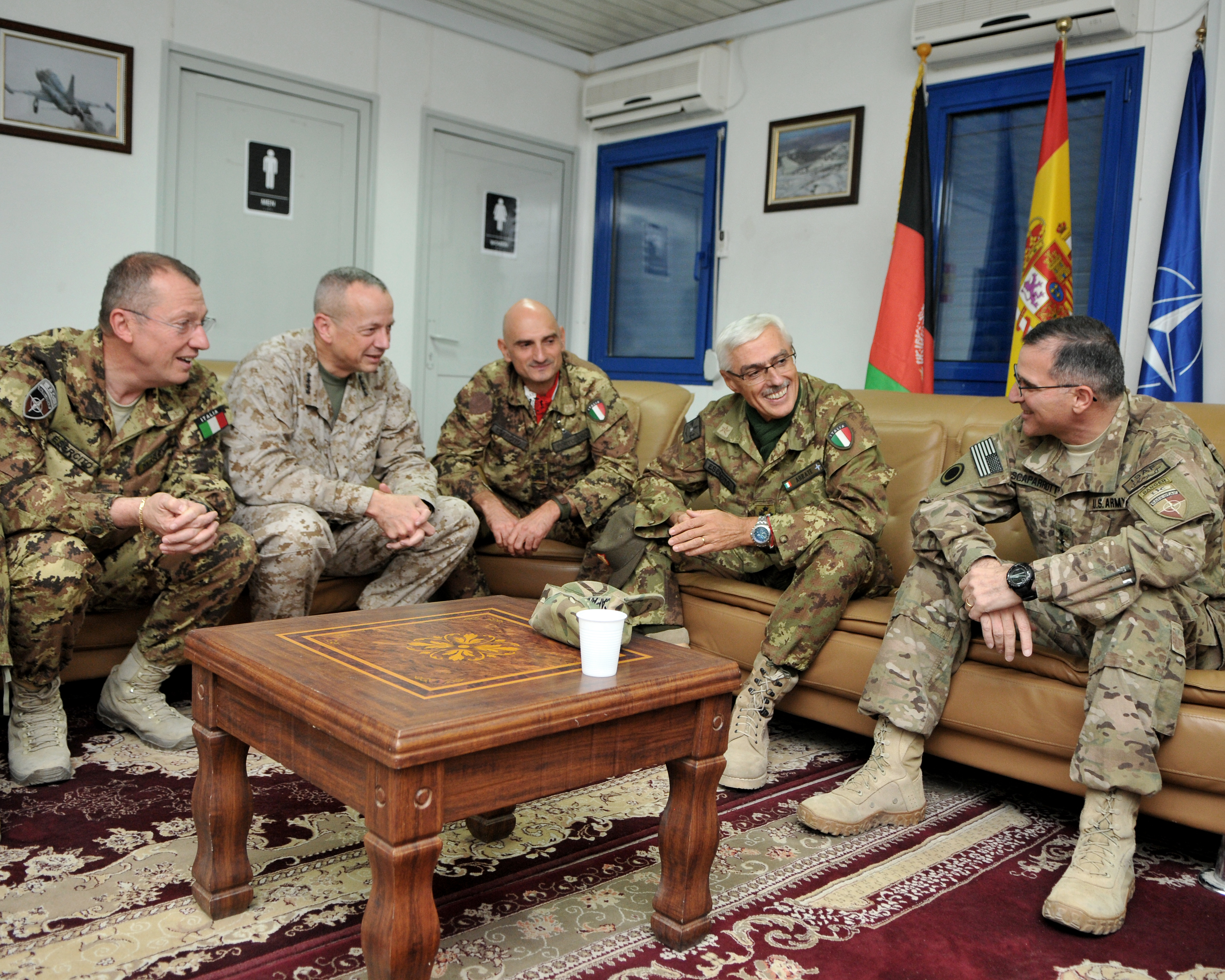
Meeting of Italian and U.S. commanders at Regional Command West headquarters in Herat.

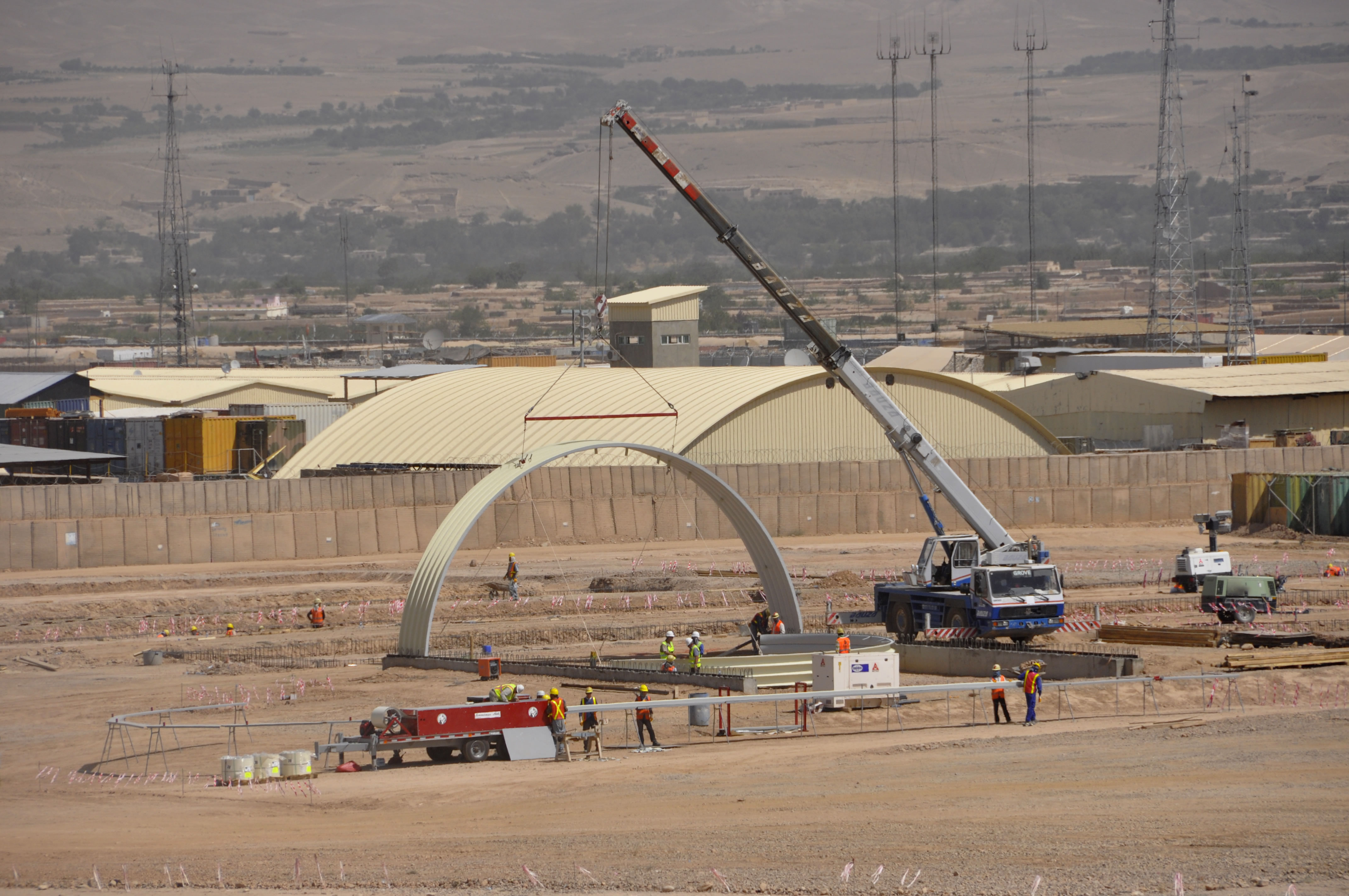
Tarin Kowt in Urozgan Province

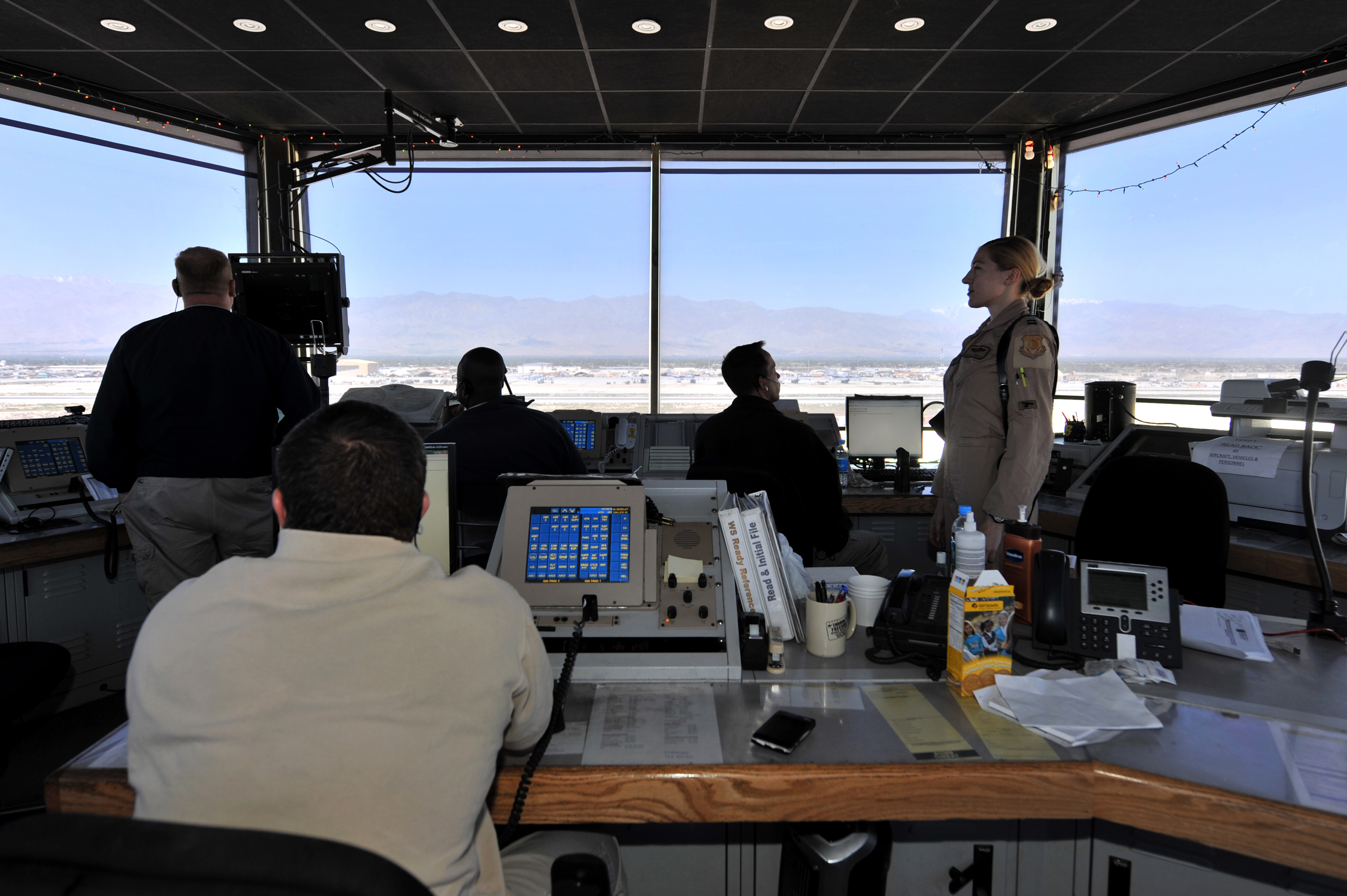
Inside the Air traffic control tower at Bagram Airfield in Parwan Province

- ISAF HQ at Kabul (Composite)
  - Commander ISAF directed three subordinate formations after a 2009 reorganization. The Intermediate Joint Command (sometimes reported as ISAF Joint Command) has been established to run the tactical battle, on the lines of Multi-National Corps Iraq. Lieutenant General James L. Terry commanded the IJC from 2012 to 2013. V Corps was being deployed from Germany to provide the IJC headquarters. Commander ISAF also supervised the NATO Training Mission-Afghanistan and Special Operations Forces. The New Zealand Special Air Service deployed in 2009 and remained there until March 2012, after previous deployments as part of Operation Enduring Freedom.
  - Deputy Chief of Staff (Air), ISAF Joint Command - Commander, NATO Air Command Afghanistan - Deputy Commander (Air), U.S. Forces Afghanistan; Director of the Air Component Coordination Element, ISAF's link to the Combined Air Operations Center in the Persian Gulf - Commander 9th Air and Space Expeditionary Task Force - Afghanistan
- Regional Command Capital (Kabul) (approx. strength: 5,420)
  - The command of this region rotated among Turkey, France, and Italy. In November 2009, Turkey was the leading nation in this region. The headquarters was in Kabul. On 31 October 2009, the Turkish Brigadier General Levent ÇOLAK took over command from a French Brigadier General. Most of the French forces in Afghanistan are in RC‑C. Strength in 2010 was approximately 6,150, including three battalions in Kabul. Nearly all of the more than forty contributors had troops deployed to Kabul. The city was under joint Afghan/coalition control since 2002 but came repeatedly under attacks from insurgent fighters.
  - Kabul International Airport KAIA (Belgium, Hungary, Greece, Hungary from December 2010)
    - In October 2009, the Bulgarian Infantry Company, part of the Bulgarian contingent (Herat, Kandahar) provided the security of the outer perimeter of KAIA, the so‑called Ground Defence Area – GDA. The Bulgarian company was under the command of the Belgium Force Protection Group.
- Regional Command North (approx. 4,400)
  - HQ RC(N), Camp Marmal, HQ Mazar-i-Sharif, Balkh province
  - RC‑N was led by Germany. On 30 November 2009, the German Brigadier General Frank Leidenberger took over command of RC‑North. Strength: appx. 5,750, to be raised. Other forces in RC‑N include units from the United States of America, Croatia, Norway, Belgium, Sweden, and Hungary et al. The situation within the Command deteriorated, and fighting included Kunduz (the Kunduz Province Campaign), as well as Faryab in the northwest.
  - Manoeuvre battalions, including QRF
  - Task Force 47 (special forces, see de:Task Force 47)
  - PRT MAZAR-I-SHARIF in Balkh province (Sweden and Finland)
  - PRT FEYZABAD (DEU) in Badakhshan province (Germany)
  - PRT KONDUZ in Kunduz province (Germany)
  - PRT POL-E KHOMRI in Baghlan Province (Hungary)
  - PRT Meymaneh in Faryab Province (Norway)
- Regional Command West (approx. 2,980)
  - HQ RC(W) in Herat, Herat province (Italy)
  - Commander in May 2010 Brig.Gen. Claudio Berto (ITA). Strength: appx 4,440
  - Forward Support Base HERAT (Spain)
  - Manoeuvre elements, Task Force 45 (special forces task force see it: Task Force 45)
  - PRT HERAT in Herat province (Italy)
  - Shindand Air Base, Herat province
  - PRT FARAH in Farah province (USA)
  - PRT QALA-E-NOW in Badghis province (Spain)
  - Chaghcharan Provincial Reconstruction Team (Ghor province) (Lithuania) (In June 2005, ISAF established in Chaghcharan, the capital of Ghor province, a Lithuanian PRT in which Danish, US and Icelandic troops also served.)
- Regional Command South (approx. 35,000)
  - HQ RC(S) at Kandahar Airfield in Kandahar Province
  - Forward Support Base Kandahar (Multinational)
  - Combined Task Force Fury
  - Combined Task Force Lancer
  - Combined Task Force 4-2 (2012–13)
  - Combined Team Uruzgan
  - Kandahar PRT in Kandahar City (Canada, USA)
  - Uruzgan PRT in Tarin Kowt, Uruzgan Province (United States, Australia)
  - Zabul PRT in Qalat, Zabul Province (USA, Romania)
  - Regional Command South also included the provinces of Nimruz and Daykundi
- Regional Command East (HQ Bagram Airfield) (approx. 18,800)
  - Apart from additional maneuver elements, RC‑E headed 13 Provincial Reconstruction Teams (PRT) in the eastern and central provinces of Afghanistan. The headquarters was located in Bagram. Other forces in RC‑E included units from France, Turkey, New Zealand, Poland, and the Czech Republic. The province was a staging ground for costly engagements. Hotspots included Kapisa, Nurestan, and Konar. The commander also directs the U.S. national force Combined Joint Task Force 1. The lead nation and main contributor was the United States. Strength: appx. 23,950, to be raised.
  - Task Force White Eagle (Polish forces' brigade in Ghazni Province)
  - Task Force 49 (ISAF SOF) in Ghazni province (Poland)
  - Task Force 50 (ISAF SOF) in Ghazni province, Paktika province (Poland)
  - Forward Support Base BAGRAM (USA)
  - PRT KAPISA in Kapisa province at FOB Nijrab, a combined French/Afghan/American TF LaFayette
  - PRT Logar in Logar province (Czech Republic)
  - PRT SHARANA in Paktika province (USA)
  - PRT KHOST in Khost province (USA)
  - PRT METHER LAM in Laghman province (USA)
  - Bamiyan Provincial Reconstruction Team, Bamiyan, Bamiyan Province (under New Zealand Defence Force command from 2003 – April 2013)
  - PRT PANJSHIR in Panjshir province (USA)
  - PRT JALALABAD in Nangarhar province (USA)
  - PRT GHAZNI in Ghazni province (Poland, USA)
  - PRT ASADABAD in Kunar Province (USA)
  - PRT PARWAN (Republic of Korea)
  - PRT NURISTAN in Parun (USA)
  - PRT WARDAK in Maidan Shar (Turkey)
  - PRT GARDEZ in Paktia province (USA)
- Regional Command Southwest (HQ Camp Leatherneck) (approx. 27,000)
  - Regional Command Southwest was established in July 2010. It was responsible for security in the Helmand and Nimroz provinces in southwestern Afghanistan. Along with the Afghan government and security forces, seven other nations contribute to RC (SW) to bring security to the region. Those nations included the United States, the United Kingdom, Georgia, Denmark, Bahrain, and Estonia. Marine Major General Richard P. Mills, the commander of RC (SW), made history by being the first U.S.; Marine to command a NATO regional command in combat.
  - Task Force Helmand (U.K. forces in central and northeast Helmand Province)
    - A Danish battle group, operated with British forces in the Green Zone in the central part of Helmand Province. The battle group consisted of two mechanized infantry companies, a tank platoon, and a flight of helicopters, plus combat support and support units.
  - Task Force Leatherneck (U.S. Marines in northern, southern, and western Helmand Province)
  - Helmand Provincial Reconstruction Team in Lashkar Gah, Helmand Province (UK, Denmark, Estonia)

=== List of Commanders ===
The command of ISAF has rotated between officers of the participating nations. The first American took command in February 2007 and only Americans have commanded ISAF since that time.

No.	Portrait	Name (born-died)	Term of office			Defence branch	Notes
No.	Portrait	Name (born-died)	Took office	Left office	Time in office	Defence branch	Notes
1		Major general John C. McColl (born 1952)	10 January 2002	20 June 2002	161 days	British Army	Initial ISAF HQ formed from HQ 3rd Mechanised Division
2		Lieutenant general Hilmi Akin Zorlu	20 June 2002	10 February 2003	235 days	Turkish Land Forces	
3		Lieutenant general Norbert van Heyst (born 1944)	10 February 2003	11 August 2003	182 days	German Army	
4		Lieutenant general Götz Gliemeroth (born 1943)	11 August 2003	9 February 2004	182 days	German Army	
5		Lieutenant general Rick J. Hillier (born 1955)	9 February 2004	9 August 2004	182 days	Canadian Army	14th Chief of the Defence Staff (Canada) of the Canadian Armed Forces
6		Lieutenant general Jean-Louis Py	9 August 2004	13 February 2005	188 days	French Army	
7		Lieutenant general Ethem Erdağı	13 February 2005	5 August 2005	173 days	Turkish Land Forces	Former commander of 3rd Corps (Turkey)
8		Corps General; Mauro del Vecchio (1946-2025)	5 August 2005	4 May 2006	272 days	Italian Army	Former commander of NATO Rapid Deployable Corps Italy and appointed to become commander of Italian Joint Operational Headquarters
9		General; Sir David J. Richards (born 1952)	4 May 2006	4 February 2007	276 days	British Army	
10		General; Dan K. McNeill (born 1946)	4 February 2007	3 June 2008	1 year, 120 days	United States Army	Former Commander of the Army Forces Command.
11		General; David D. McKiernan (born 1950)	3 June 2008	15 June 2009	1 year, 12 days	United States Army	Relieved from command by Secretary of Defense Robert Gates.
12		General; Stanley A. McChrystal (born 1954)	15 June 2009	23 June 2010	1 year, 8 days	United States Army	Resigned and was relieved from command due to critical remarks directed at the Obama administration in a Rolling Stone Magazine article.
–		Lieutenant general Nick Parker (born 1954)	23 June 2010	4 July 2010	11 days	British Army	Served as deputy commander of ISAF from McChrystal's resignation up to Petraeus's assumption of command.
13		General; David H. Petraeus (born 1952)	4 July 2010	18 July 2011	1 year, 14 days	United States Army	Nominated to become the fourth Director of the CIA.
14		General; John R. Allen (born 1953)	18 July 2011	10 February 2013	1 year, 207 days	United States Marine Corps	Near the end of his term, General Allen became embroiled in an inappropriate communication investigation.
15		General; Joseph F. Dunford Jr. (born 1955)	10 February 2013	26 August 2014	1 year, 197 days	United States Marine Corps	Nominated to become the 36th Commandant of the Marine Corps.
16		General; John F. Campbell (born 1957)	26 August 2014	28 December 2014	124 days	United States Army	Became the 1st commander of ISAF's successor command, Resolute Support Mission.

== Contributing nations ==
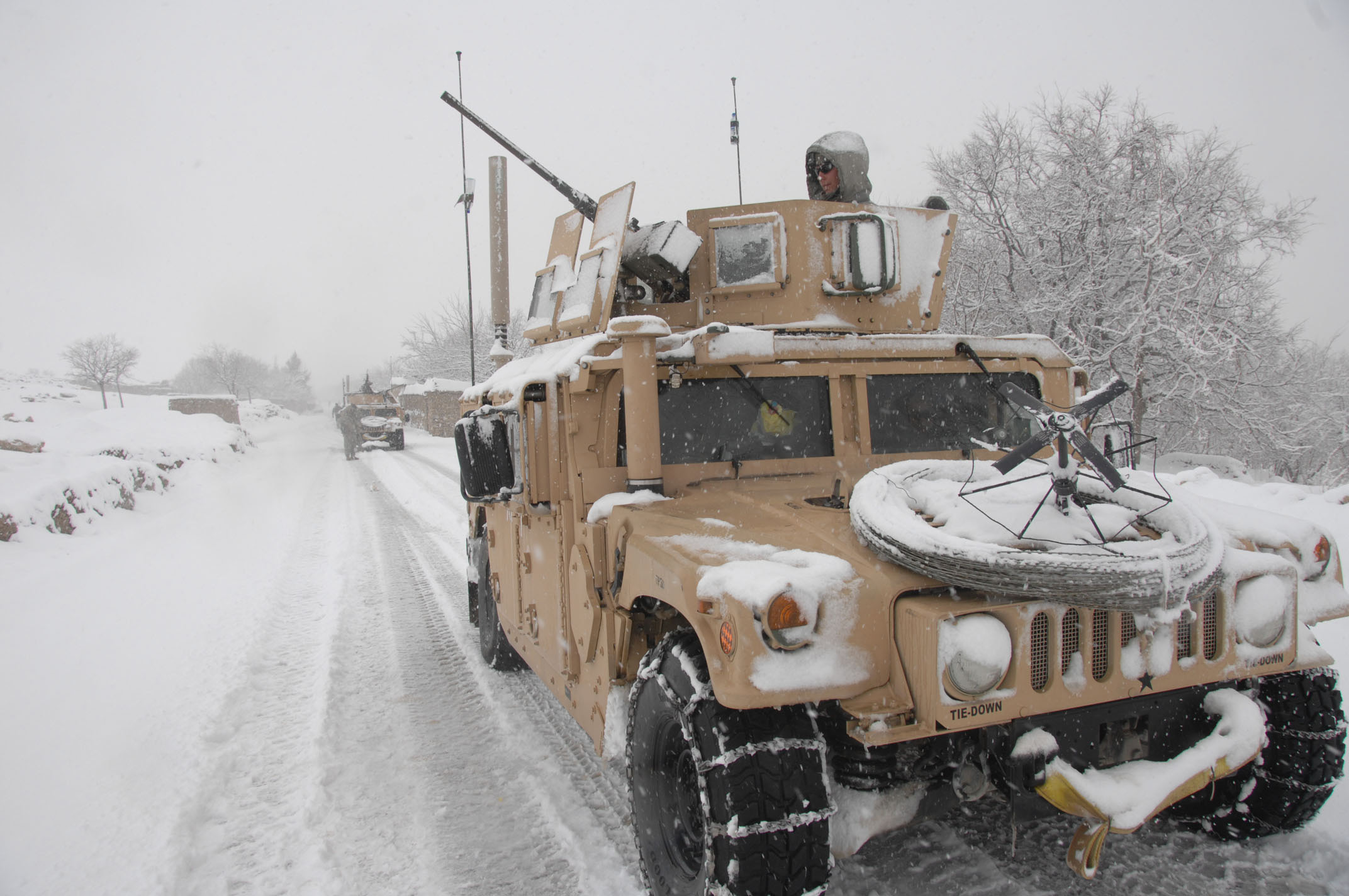
Convoy of U.S. forces passing by in Kapisa Province.

All NATO member states have contributed troops to the ISAF, as well as some other partner states of the NATO alliance.

=== NATO states ===
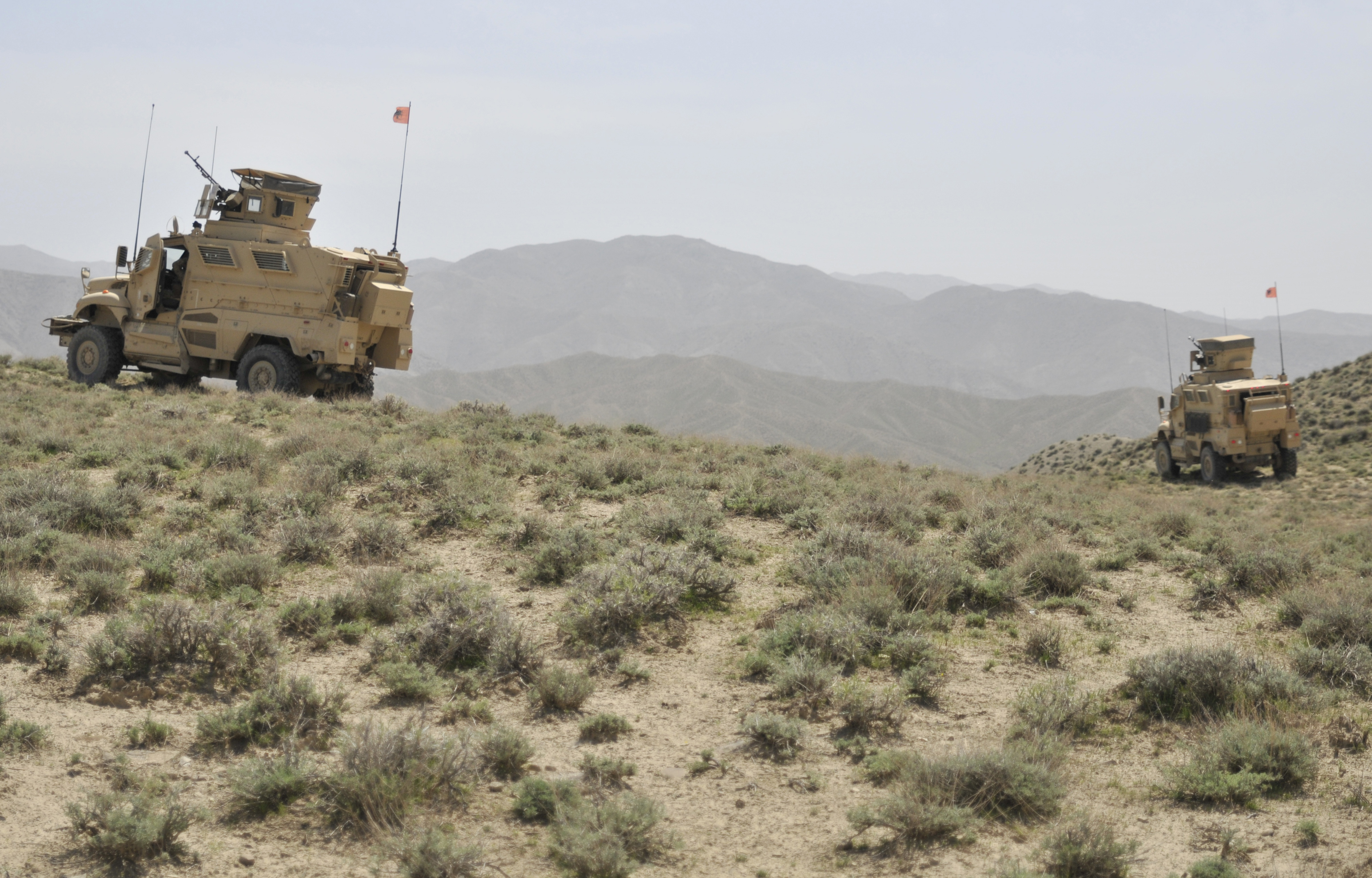
Albanian special operations forces provide security for coalition forces at an Afghan Border Police checkpoint near the Afghanistan-Pakistan border in the Spin Boldak district of Kandahar province, Afghanistan, April 1, 2013.

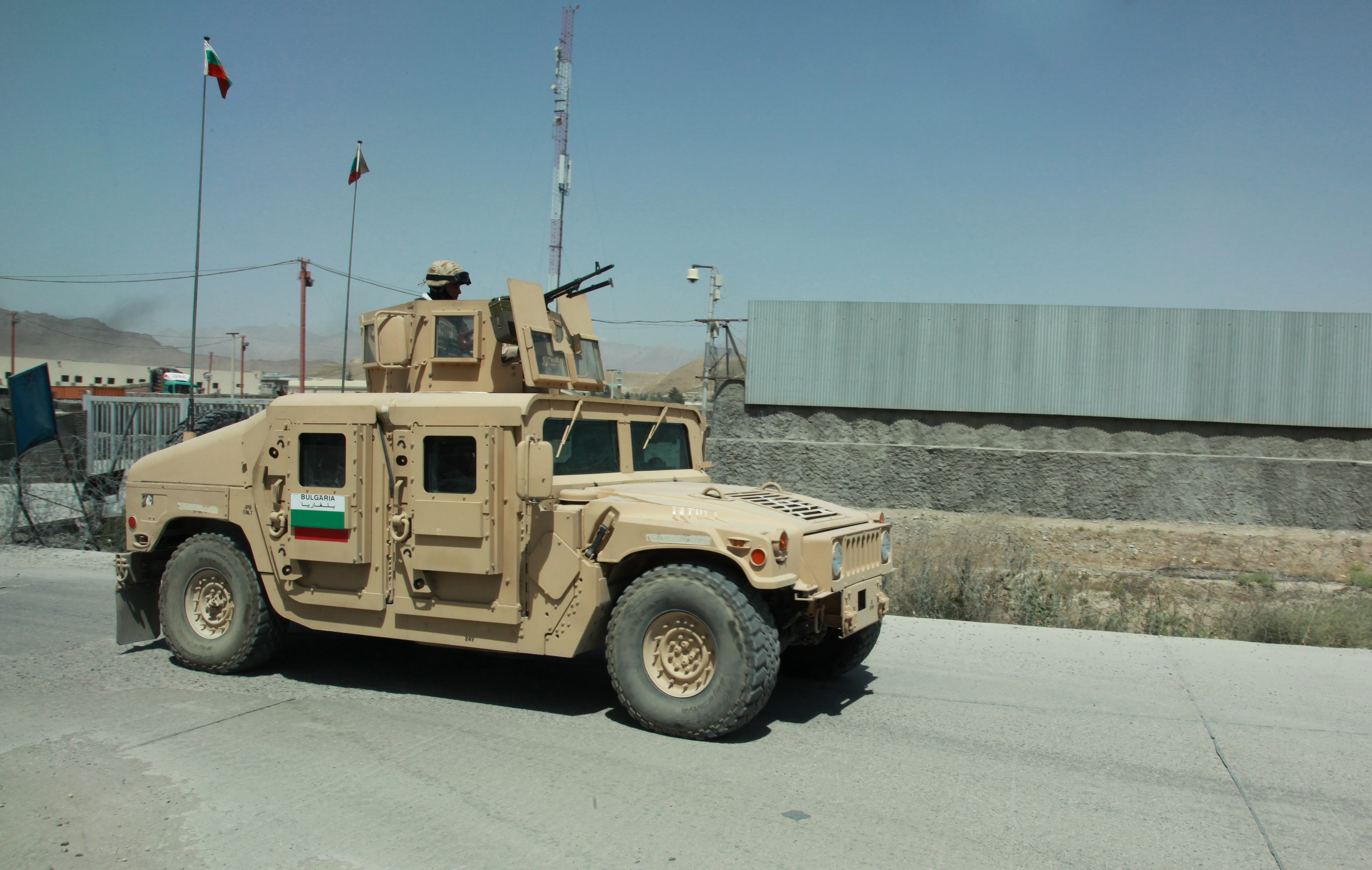
A Bulgarian land forces up-armored M1114 patrol in Kabul, July 2009

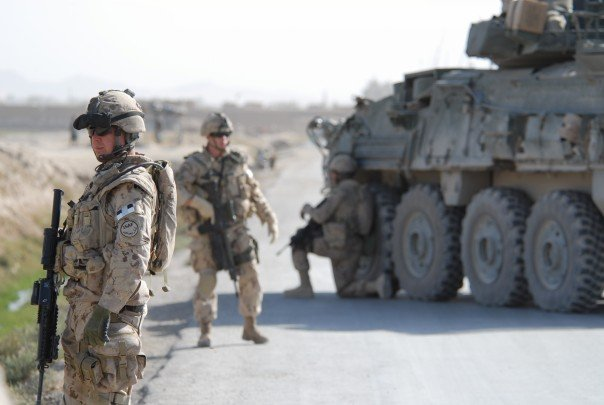
Soldiers from the Canadian Grenadier Guards in Kandahar Province.

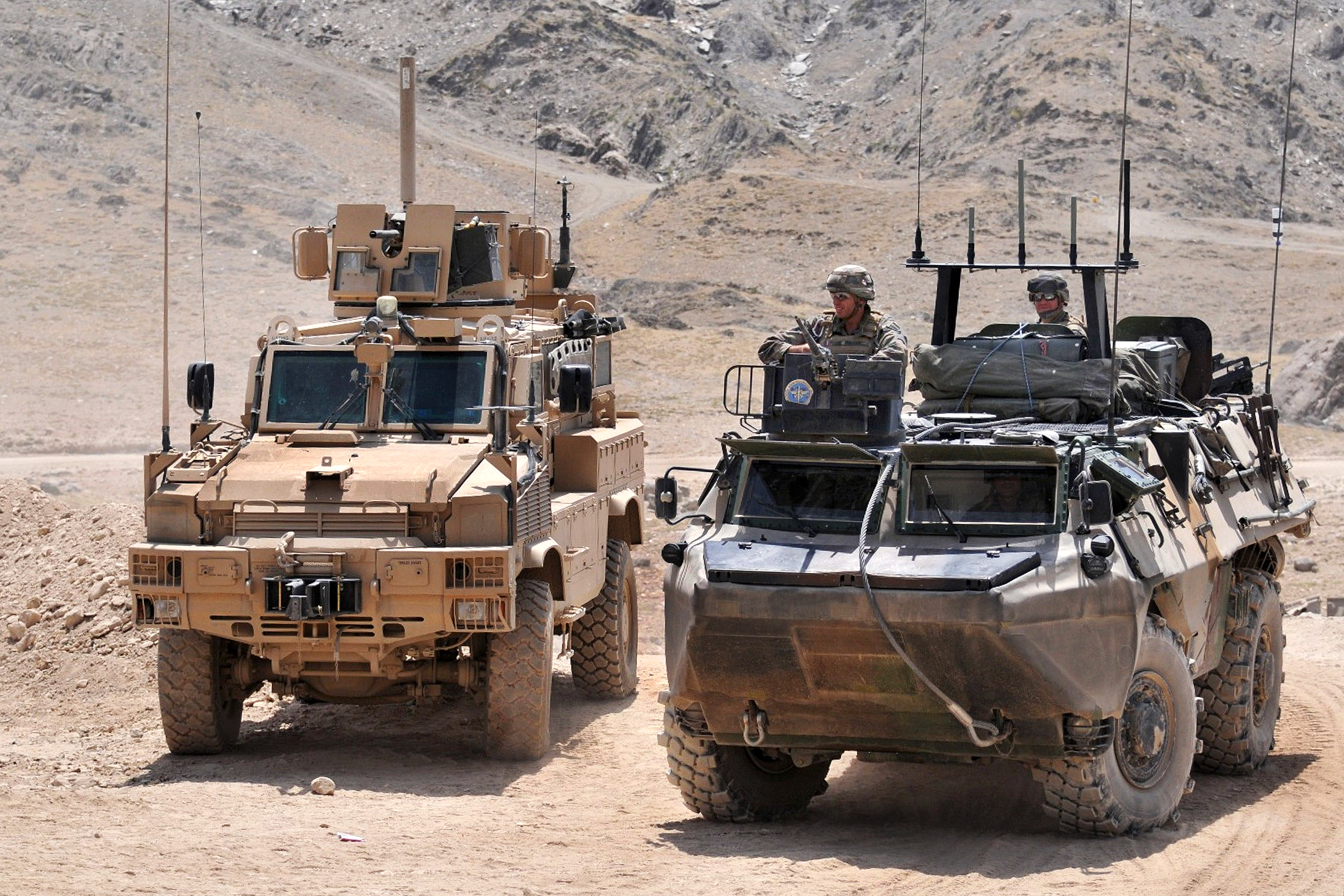
French units on duty with ISAF.

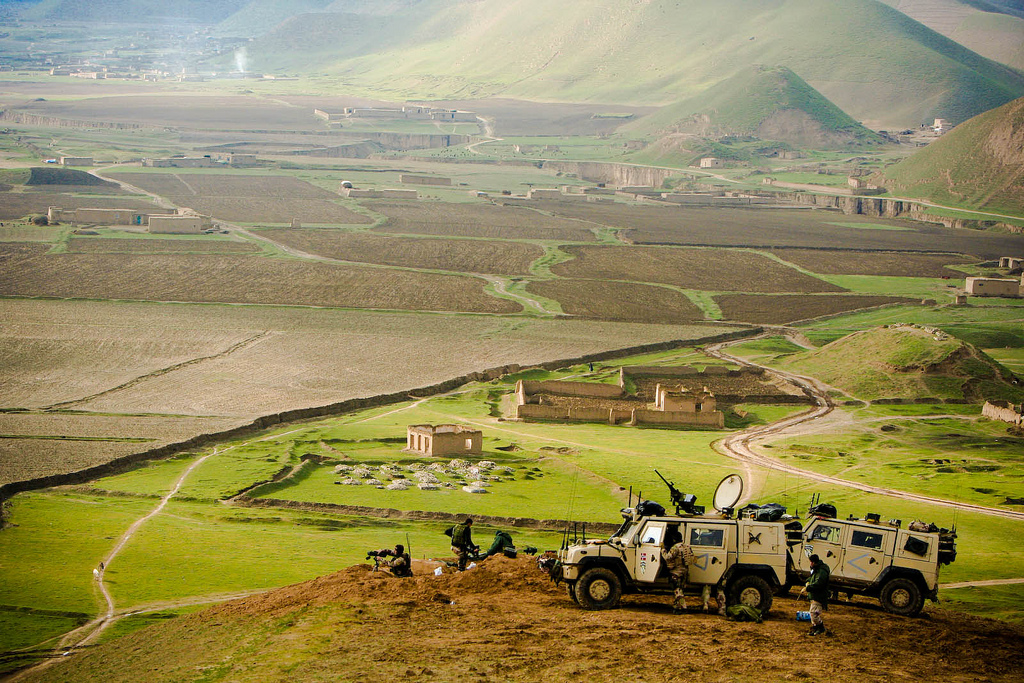
Norwegian soldiers in Faryab Province.

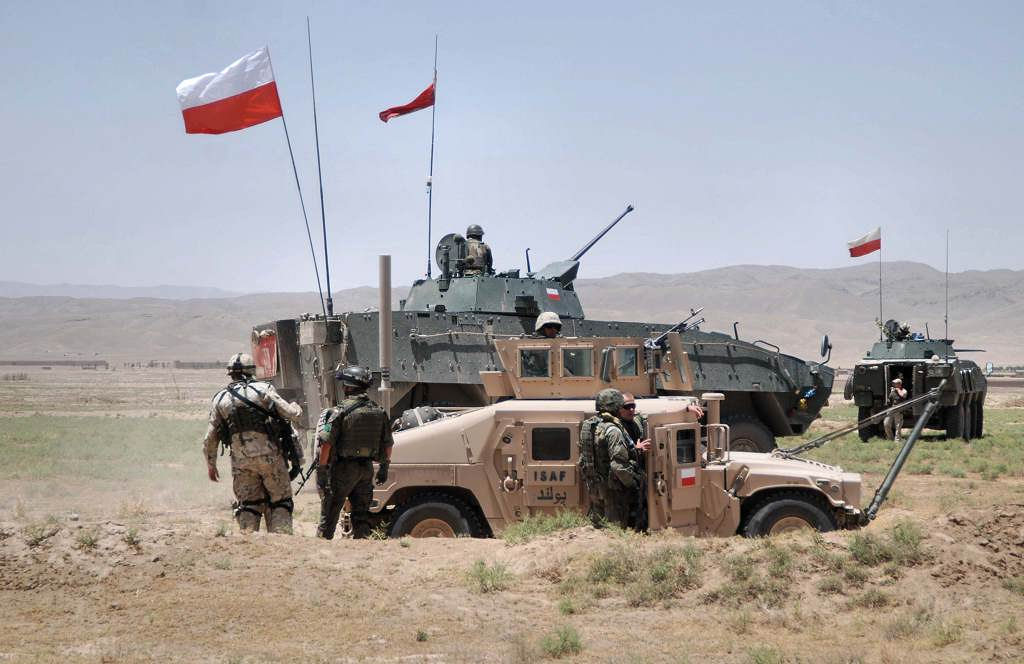
Polish forces in Afghanistan.

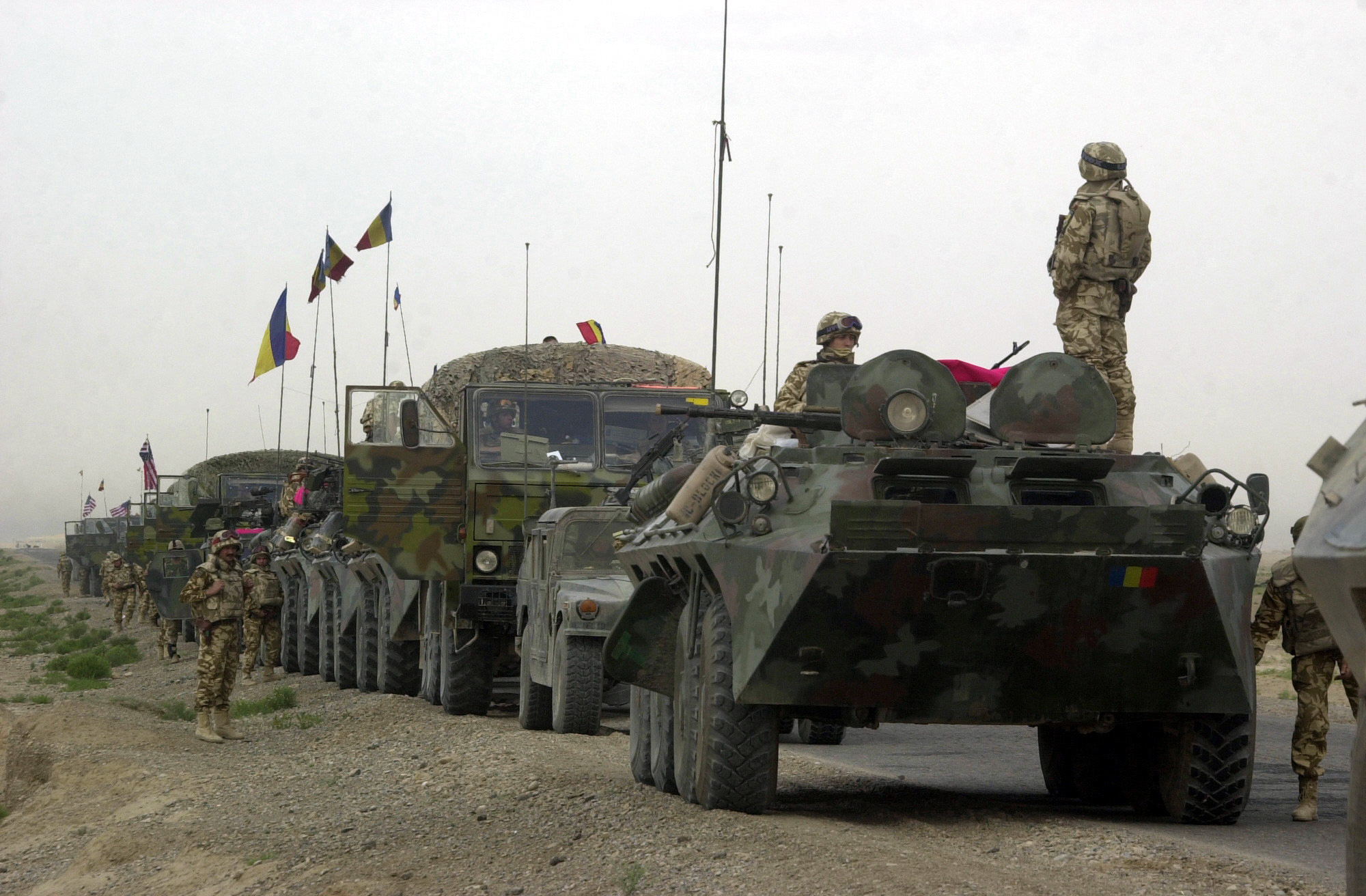
Romanian soldiers in southern Afghanistan in 2003.

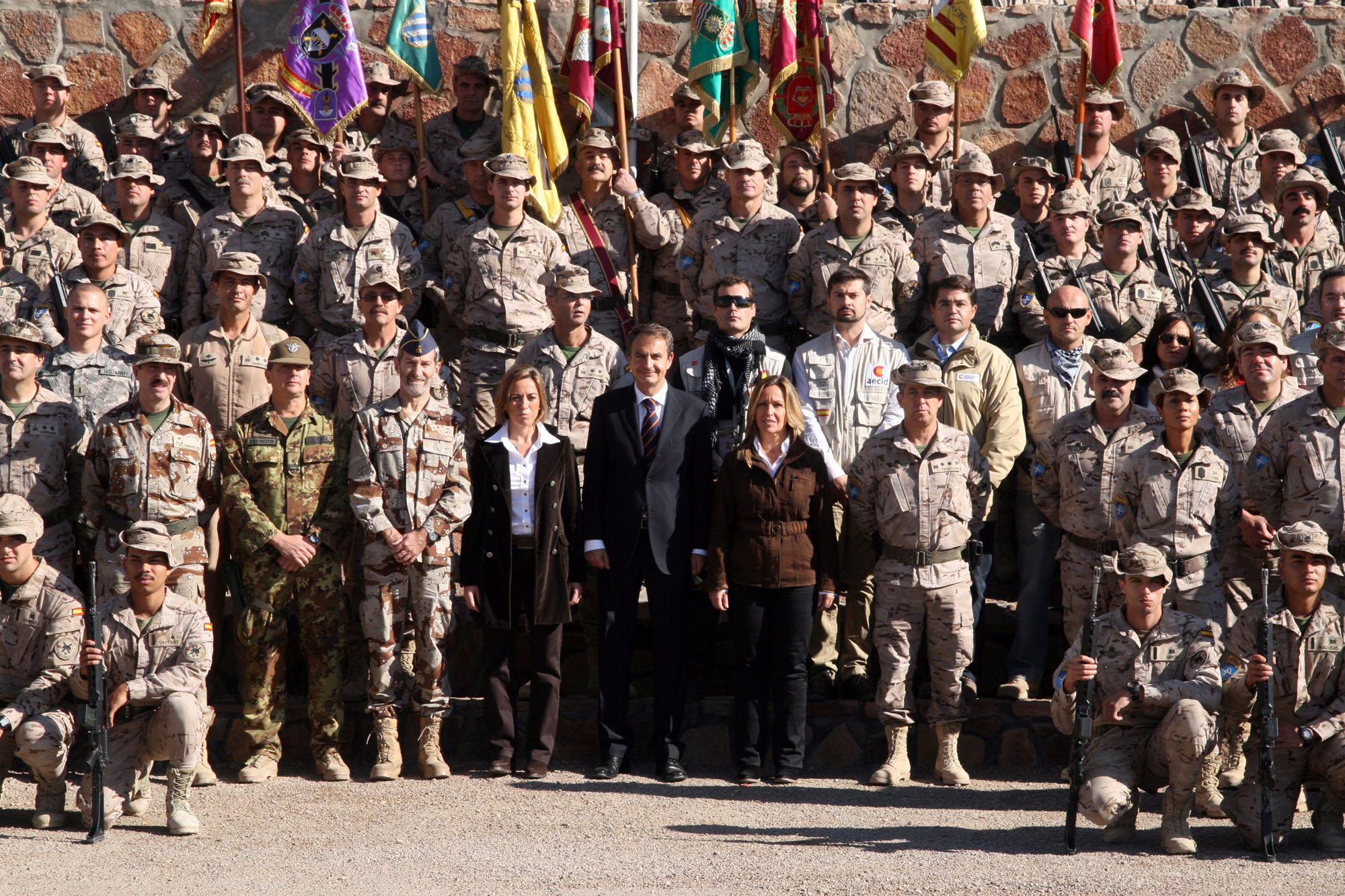
Visiting politicians of Spain with soldiers of the Spanish army in 2010.

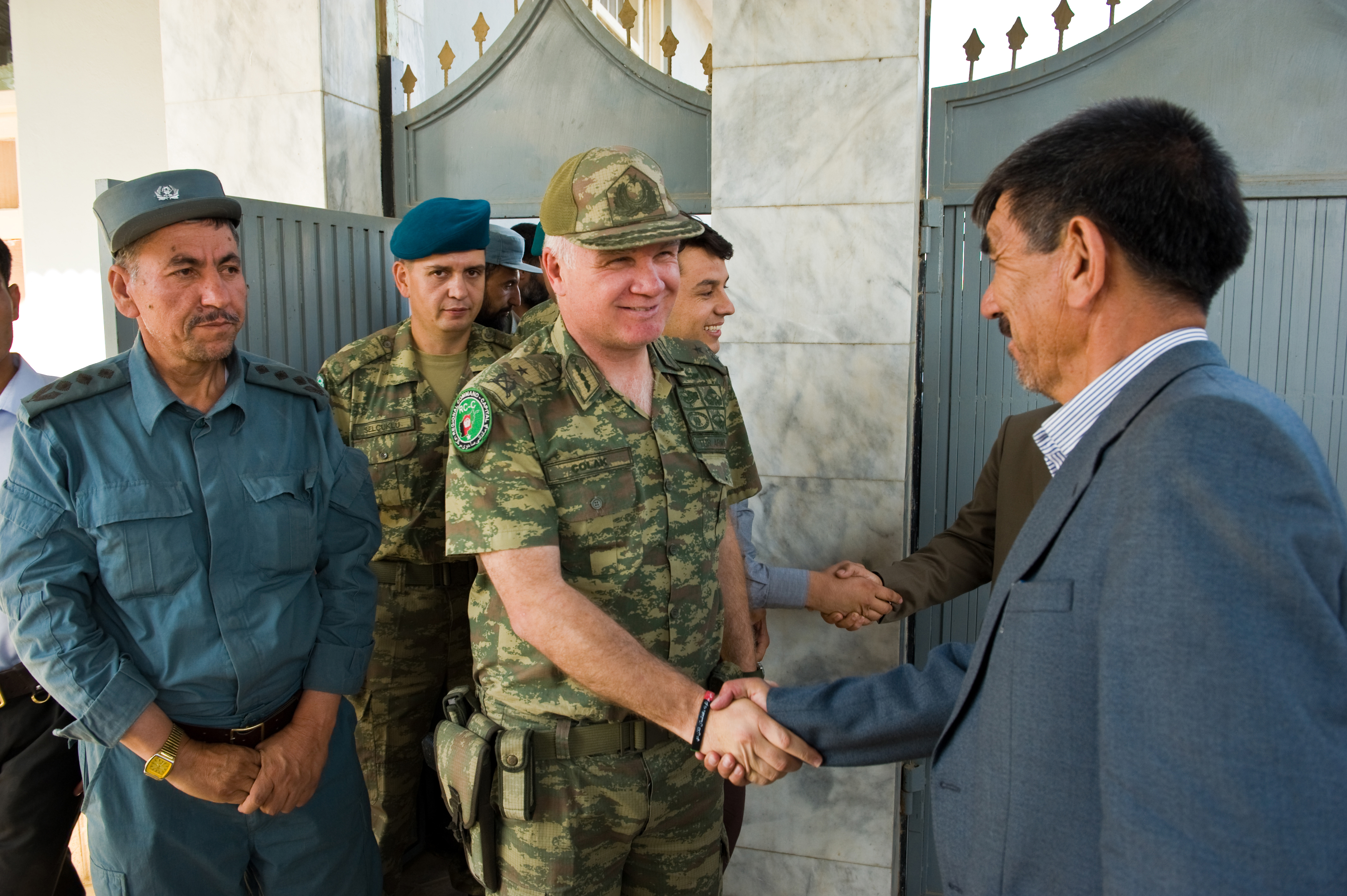
A Turkish general during a food distribution in Afghanistan.

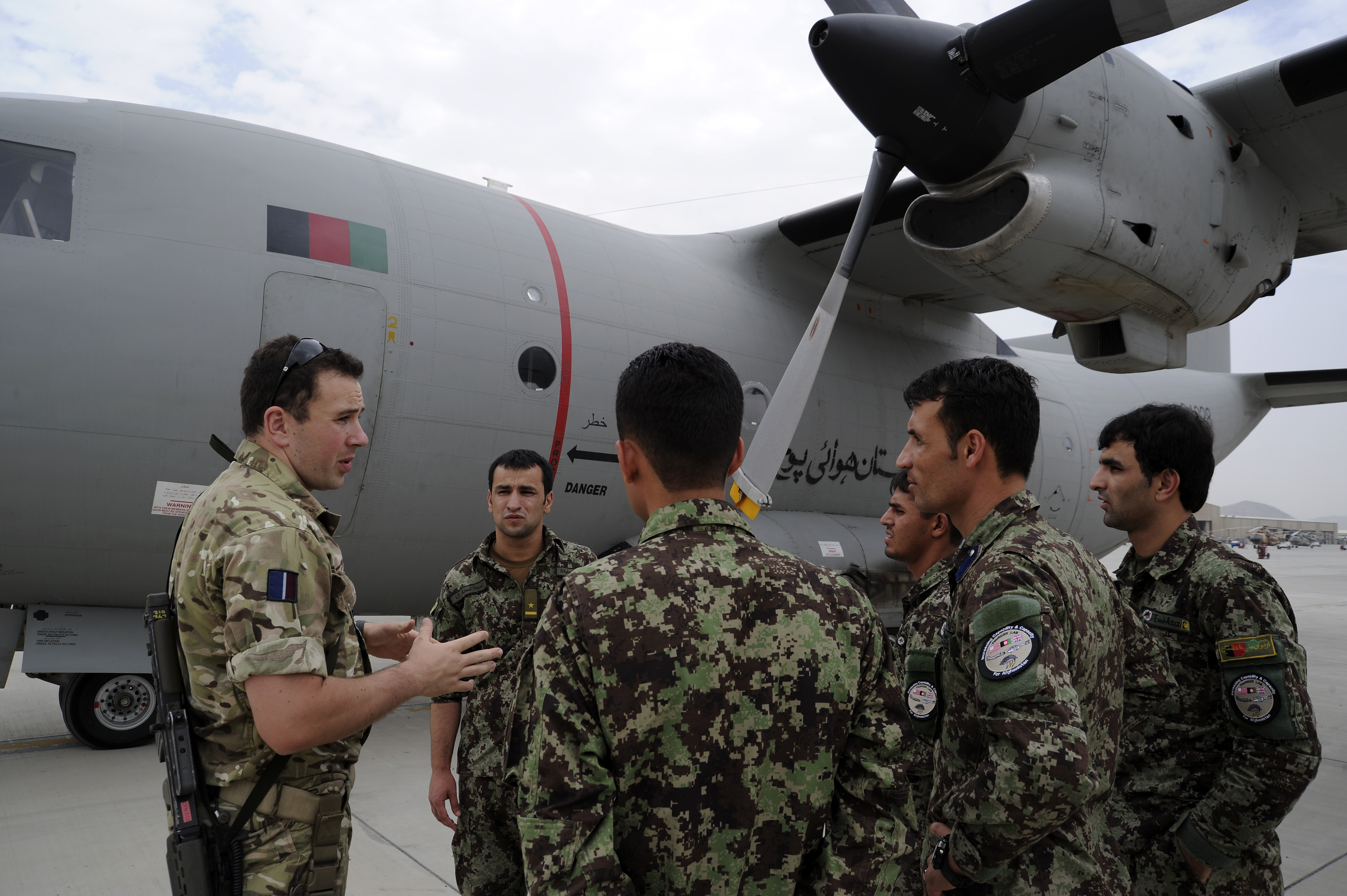
United Kingdom's Royal Air Force Flight Lieutenant Luke Meldon explains the components of an Afghan Air Force (AAF) C-27 Spartan to five Thunder Lab students.

==== Albania ====
On 28 July 2010, Albania sent 44 soldiers from the Albanian Special Operations Battalion to engage in combat operations in the province of Kandahar alongside US and British special forces. The contingent was given the name "Eagle 1". On 25 January 2011, the second rotation consisting of 45 soldiers named "Eagle 2" was sent to Afghanistan following the return of the first, "Eagle 3" followed. On 16 January 2011, Albania sent its fourth mission codenamed "Eagle 4" to Kandahar. However, the main contingent was composed of a company under Italian command in the province of Herat. Albania also had a squad of soldiers under Turkish command in Kabul and a contribution to a joint medical team with the Czech contingent. The last contingent was composed of 222 soldiers of the 8th Regiment.

==== Belgium ====
The Belgian mission was named BELU ISAF 21. Their main task was to provide security at Kabul International Airport, while detachments (KUNDUZ 16) assisted in the northern PRTs of Kunduz and Mazar-i-Sharif. In September 2008, OGF 4 started: four F‑16s with about 140 support personnel deployed. They operated from Kandahar Airport. The Belgian Air Force operated in close cooperation with Dutch F-16 fighter jets already deployed there.

==== Bulgaria ====
In December 2009, Bulgarian Minister of Defence Nickolay Mladenov said that the Bulgarian contingent in Afghanistan, which was divided between two military bases in Kabul and Kandahar with a total of 602 soldiers, would be consolidated in Kandahar and that it could add 100 troops in Afghanistan in 2010. In July 2011, Bulgaria sent 165 more soldiers bringing the total number to 767. Bulgarian troops participated in training the Afghan forces and providing security until their withdrawal in 2021.

==== Canada ====
Canadian Forces were actively engaged in fighting the Taliban in the south and suffered a high proportion of the allied casualties. In 2006, with the situation in Kandahar Province turned increasingly violent, the Canadian Forces participated in several operations and battles from the beginning of the war in Afghanistan in 2001. The Royal Canadian Air Force had a major presence in Afghanistan, including three CC‑130 Hercules cargo planes, two CP‑140 surveillance planes, six CH‑147 Chinook transport helicopters, six Mil Mi‑8 leased for one year from Skylink Aviation, eight CH‑146 Griffon utility helicopters and three CU‑170 unmanned aerial vehicles. The Canadian Army increased their presence with main battle tanks, some ten Leopard C2 and twenty Leopard 2A6M CAN, approximately one hundred LAV III armored vehicles and six 155 mm M777 howitzers. Canada has suffered 159 killed in Afghanistan. In 2011, all Canadian combat forces had withdrawn from Kandahar and relocated the bulk of their forces to Kabul, with detachments in RC North and RC West. Canada completed its participation in March 2014.

==== Croatia ====
Croatian troops were involved in three locations. The Croatian parliament voted on extra troop numbers on 7 December with all parties supporting a troop increase, parliament also recognized that additional increases in troop numbers might be possible during 2011 and 2012 to help train local army and police units. Maximal number of Croatian soldiers in Afghanistan was about 450.

==== Czech Republic ====
Czech troops in Afghanistan were involved in four locations. In Czech combat units (special forces) in peak served 100–120 troops. In other non-combat military units, primarily engineering, medical, trainee, advisory, or guard, served during the tours of about 4000 soldiers, medical staff, civilian engineers, and other specialists. The largest unit was deployed as PRT Logar composed of 192 troops and 12 civilians in Logar Province, in place since 19 March 2008. Four BMP‑2 IFVs were part of PRT Logar, however, they were only involved in guarding the Shank Base due to their weak IED protection. 4 Pandur II were also part of PRT Logar, which were actively used in operations. The Iveco LMV was the most commonly used vehicle by the Czech Armed Forces all over Afghanistan. The Field Hospital at Kabul Airport was deployed in March 2007 and consisted of 81 medical and 30 NBC protection personnel. Eight helicopter pilots and technicians were part of the Operational Mentoring and Liaison Team (OMLT). Also, four weather forecast specialists and two air traffic controllers were part of the Czech contingent deployed to Kabul International Airport. A third unit was sent to Afghanistan at the end of April 2007 and involved 350 members of the Czech Military Police Special Operations Group, who were attached to British forces in the Southern Helmand province. A fourth unit was deployed in July 2008 and was composed of 63 troops who were in charge of force protection at Dutch FOB Hadrain in Uruzgan Province. The Czechs also donated 6 Mi‑17 and 6 Mi‑24 helicopters to the Afghan National Army, flew 3 Mi‑17 helicopters in Pakitika Province, and announced the deployment of one C‑295 in 2011. Nine Czech soldiers were killed in Afghanistan.

==== Denmark ====
In Kandahar, Royal Danish Air Force (RDAF) personnel helped man the Kandahar Airfield Crisis Establishment (KAF CE), which ran the airfield. Danish troops were also deployed to other parts of Afghanistan. In northern Afghanistan, approximately twenty troops served in the German-led PRT in Faizabad. In western Afghanistan, ten troops served in the Lithuanian-led PRT in Chagcharan. There was also a small contribution to ISAF headquarters in Kabul and the staffing of Kabul International Airport. There was also a RDAF presence with the NATO AWACS contingent in Mazar-i-Sharif. In Helmand Danish troops were involved in the worst fighting their armed forces had undertaken since the Second Schleswig War of 1864. Denmark lost 43 soldiers in Afghanistan. A Danish SOF Task Force was operating in Lashkar Gar mentoring Afghan forces. A 2009 survey argued that Denmark had by far the highest count of casualties relative to population.

==== Estonia ====
Most of the Estonian Afghanistan Contingent was deployed to PRT Lashkar-Gah in Helmand, together with the forces of the United Kingdom and Denmark. 9 Estonian soldiers were killed in Afghanistan.

==== France ====
French forces deployed in the Surobi District and to the Kapisa Province under the command of the Brigade La Fayette. Six French Dassault Mirage 2000D fighters and two C‑135F refueling aircraft were based at Dushanbe Airport in Dushanbe, Tajikistan but relocated to Kandahar on 26 September 2007. Two hundred naval, air force, and army special forces personnel were withdrawn from Southern Afghanistan in early 2007, but around 50 remained to train Afghan forces. On 26 February 2008 it was reported that Paris would deploy troops to the east to free up American soldiers, who would then be able to assist Canadian forces in Kandahar. Shortly afterwards, 700 troops were deployed to reinforce Surobi and Kapisa. The deployment marked a significant change in French policy in Afghanistan. It was later announced that 100 additional troops and Aérospatiale Gazelle helicopters would be sent to the country. France decided to send Eurocopter Tiger attack helicopters to Afghanistan in the second quarter of 2009. In April 2010, French president Nicolas Sarkozy ruled out sending additional troops to Afghanistan shortly. 88 French troops have been killed in Afghanistan. An additional OMLT of 250 arrived in October 2010, bringing the number of French forces in Afghanistan to 4,000. The remaining troops are to be withdrawn by the end of 2012.

==== Germany ====
The German Bundeswehr led Regional Command North based in Mazar-i-Sharif. The task of the German forces was to assist the Afghan government with security and reconstruction in the four northern provinces of Kunduz, Takhar, Baghlan and Badakhshan. Germany leads the Provincial Reconstruction Teams in the provinces of Kunduz and Badakhshan. The mandate issued by the Bundestag does not allow the Bundeswehr to take part in combat operations against the Taliban insurgency in the south and east of Afghanistan, other than in exceptional circumstances. However, German troops together with allied forces of Regional Command North conducted their combat operations in northern and northeast Afghanistan, inflicting as many as 650 casualties upon insurgents. Germany has agreed to send 850 additional troops in 2010, raising the mandate ceiling to 5,350 troops. 53 German troops and 3 police officers were killed in Afghanistan. 156 service members were wounded in action. In the 2006 German troops controversy, 23 German soldiers were accused of posing with human skulls in Afghanistan. Following the Kunduz airstrike on two captured fuel tankers, which killed over 100 civilians, Germany reclassified the Afghanistan deployment in February 2010 as an "armed conflict within the parameters of international law", allowing German forces to act without risk of prosecution under German law.

==== Greece ====
ΕΛΔΑΦ was established as a Unit at the headquarters of the 71st Brigade on January 14, 2002, in the context of Greece's participation in the International Security Assistance Force (ISAF). It included the Special Battalion of Engineers (ELMHEA) and a security personnel element. In June 2005, the mission was renamed ΤΕΣΑΦ (Afghanistan Special Forces Battalion) and in conjunction with the 299 ΚΙΧΝΕ ( Mobile Army Surgical Hospital), they formed the ΕΛΔΑΦ-2. A total of 3,295 officers (524 officers and 2,771 non-commissioned officers) served in ΕΛΔΑΦ-2, while a total of 28 senior officers served as commanders. The work of the Hellenic Force in Afghanistan included the distribution of humanitarian aid and medical supplies, the reconstruction of government buildings, the maintenance of public works, and the reconstruction of schools. ΤΕΝΞ (Landmine Clearance Battalion) cleared landmine fields and worked on the disposal of explosives remnants. Engineer personnel and equipment were also provided for the release of Afghan civilians from the rubble of Kabul Hospital, which collapsed on July 26, 2004. The Greek presence in Afghanistan ended in July 2021, when the last 4 assisting officers left the country.

==== Hungary ====
The Hungarian infantry unit was situated in Kabul, however, on 1 October 2006, Hungary requisitioned its forces and took over responsibility from the Dutch for the Provincial Reconstruction Team in the town of Pul‑e Khumri, the capital of Baghlan province. From 1 October 2008, one of the tasks of the Hungarians was to provide security at Kabul International Airport. In 2008 Hungarian special forces deployed to South Afghanistan for special reconnaissance and patrol operations. In 2010 Budapest added 200 soldiers to the 340 troops it already has in Afghanistan working on reconstruction and training. Six Hungarian soldiers were killed in Afghanistan.

==== Iceland ====
Icelandic personnel were stationed at ISAF HQ at Kabul International Airport.

==== Italy ====
Italian troops currently lead Regional Command West and the PRT in Herat Province. Although the mandate issued by the Parliament of Italy does not allow Italian forces to take part in the battle against the Taliban insurgency in the south and east of Afghanistan, other than in exceptional circumstances, the former Italian Minister of Defense Ignazio La Russa has officially stated in July 2008 that such combat activities have indeed taken place over the last year in the Farah area. An Italian contingent including 9 helicopters Agusta A129 Mangusta, 2 C‑27 Spartan, 1 C‑130, 3 AB‑212, 3 CH‑47. Additionally, in April 2008, 4 AMX International AMX reconnaissance jets and 3 helicopters AB‑412, with corresponding 250 personnel (also included), were deployed to Kabul in support of ISAF combat operations in the country. In February 2009 the Italian government decided to boost its contingent by 800 to help out with police training and economic development. A thousand more soldiers were sent in Afghanistan in 2010, for 3,800 in total. Italy has suffered 53 casualties in Afghanistan.

==== Latvia ====
Latvian troops were divided between Kabul and the PRTs in Mazar-i-Sharif and Meymaneh as of December 2007. Several special operations forces operate in the restive south. Three Latvian soldiers were killed in Afghanistan.

==== Lithuania ====
The Lithuanian military contingent was situated in Chaghcharan, Ghor Province. In 2005, Lithuania took over responsibility for the Provincial Reconstruction Team in Ghor Province. Between 2005 and 2013, about 2,500 Lithuanian soldiers were deployed to Ghor Province in seventeen rotations, with approximately 150 troops per rotation. One Lithuanian soldier was killed in Afghanistan.

==== Montenegro ====
Stationed at two bases, Pol-e-Khomri and Marmal.

==== Netherlands ====
The Netherlands deployed aircraft as part of the European Participating Air Force (EPAF) in support of ground operations in Afghanistan. The Netherlands deployed further troops and helicopters to Afghanistan in 2006 as part of a new operation in the south. Dutch ground and air forces totaled almost 2,000 personnel during 2006, taking part in combat operations alongside British and Canadian forces in the south. The Netherlands has suffered 21 casualties in Afghanistan. The Netherlands announced in December 2007 that it would begin withdrawing its troops, mainly in Uruzgan, in July 2010. A handover to the United States and Australia took place on 1 August 2010, formally ending the Dutch combat phase. The return of vehicles and other equipment was planned to take five more months.

==== Norway ====
Norwegian troops are divided between Meymaneh in Faryab province where they lead a Provincial Reconstruction Team, and Mazar-i-Sharif, where they operate alongside Swedish forces. Four Royal Norwegian Air Force F‑16s operated from Kabul during 2006. Decisions were made to reinforce the Norwegian contribution with 150 special forces, an aeromedical detachment of three Bell 412 helicopters and around 60 personnel from 339 Squadron to be based at Camp Meymaneh for 18 months from 1 April 2008, and 50 troops tasked with training Afghan soldiers. After the attack on the Serena Hotel on 14 January 2008, the decision was made to send a team of military explosives experts to Kabul. Nine Norwegian soldiers were killed while on duty.

==== Poland ====
The Polish brigade-level Task Force White Eagle was responsible for the province of Ghazni. The task force was based in five different locations around the province: FOB Warrior, COP Qarabagh, FB Giro, FB Four Corners, and FOB Ghazni. The Polish contingent operated 70 Rosomak wheeled armored vehicles and 40 Cougars on loan from the United States. Additionally, 4 Mil Mi‑24 and 4 Mil Mi‑17 were in use. In December 2009, the Polish Ministry of Defence announced that as of April 2010, it would dispatch an additional 60 Rosomaks, 5 Mi‑17 and 600 troops. The contingent would also include 400 backup troops based in Poland who could be deployed in Afghanistan at short notice. In March 2010, the Polish MoND announced that one battalion of the American 101st Airborne Division would be dispatched to Ghazni and would operate under Polish command. Thirty-seven Polish troops were killed in Afghanistan. Two Polish special forces units, TF‑49 and TF‑50, operated in Ghazni Province and partially in Paktika Province.

==== Portugal ====
Portuguese participation in operations in Afghanistan began in February 2002. A military health detachment composed of the three branches of the Armed Forces remained in Kabul for three months in a British ISAF campaign hospital. Followed by a C‑130 Detachment acted from Karachi (Pakistan), between April and July of that year. In May 2004, Portugal became involved with a C‑130 Detachment and supporting staff of the Portuguese Air Force, as meteorologists, firefighters, and drivers, based at Kabul International Airport (KAIA). In August 2005, the Portuguese Air Force took command of KAIA with several of its services (for three months), but now without aircraft. Between June and August 2005, the Portuguese Army began the task of ISAF Quick Reaction Force (QRF) with a light infantry company (alternated 4 Commandos companies and 2 of Paratroopers), and a TACP Detachment of the Air Force. Officers and sergeants of the three branches served in the ISAF HQ and other regional structures, more or less discreetly. Between late July 2008 and mid-December, a detachment of the Portuguese Air Force, incorporating a C‑130 and support staff in various specialties, like maintenance and force protection, totaling some 40 soldiers, met the new mission from Kabul. In addition to one seriously injured and several light injuries, the Portuguese army suffered two deaths, on 18 November 2005 and on 24 November 2007. The Portuguese forces for 2012 were: a Military Intelligence Cell, an Army Military Advisor Team for Afghan Capital Division HQ, 2 Air Force Advisor Teams, one for Afghan Air Force Academy and the other for Kabul International Airport, one GNR (gendarmerie type police) Advisor Team at National Police Training Center, in Wardak, Army Police and Navy Marines in service with Kabul International Airport Force Protection and a Support Unit for Portuguese forces with a Protection Company (2 Commando Platoons) and a Logistic Platoon (Maintenance, Health and communications)

==== Romania ====
Romanian forces consist of a battalion in Qalat, Zabul Province. Additionally, a special forces squad (39 personnel) operates from Tagab in Kapisa Province, and a training detachment of 47 personnel is in Kabul under the U.S.‑led Operation Enduring Freedom. In January 2010, Romania announced plans to send 600 more troops to Afghanistan, boosting its military presence there to more than 1,600 soldiers. Romania suffered 76 casualties in Afghanistan, including 20 killed in action.

==== Slovakia ====
In 2007, at the request of NATO command, Slovak forces were moved from Kabul to operate in southern Afghanistan. Currently, there are 165 guard soldiers providing force protection at Kandahar Airbase. 57 personnel of Multirole engineer company located in Kandahar Airport. Responsible for demining, building, and repairing the airport. 53 soldiers of mechanized infantry are holding an outpost in Tarin Kowt, Uruzgan Province. 15 personnel are in the OMLT team, 4 explosives disposal specialists are part of the EOD PALADIN‑S Team. 2 personnel are part of the reconstruction team in Tarim Kowt. Twelve officers are members of commanding staff in – HQ ISAF IJC, RC-S, KAF a PALADIN. 15 personnel are part of the National Support Element (NSE) in Kandahar Airport. In September 2011, 20 soldiers of 5th Special Forces Regiment were deployed to Afghanistan to help with mentoring and training of Afghan National Police personnel.

==== Slovenia ====
Slovenian troops (including two civilians – CIMIC programme) perform OMLT (mentoring an Infantry Battalion in Bala Boluk and joint mentoring with Italian army of a Combat Support Battalion in Herat) and PRT tasks; and also placing some commanding positions in Regional Command West and ISAF HQ.

==== Spain ====
The collective Spanish military contribution to ISAF is known as ASPFOR. Spanish forces are divided between Herat Province, where they form a quick-reaction company, an instructors team for Afghan National Army training and a Combat Search & Rescue unit; Kabul, and Badghis Province, where they lead PRT Qala-i-Naw. The deployment involves engineers, infantry, a transport helicopters unit, and a logistics component. Spanish soldiers are constrained by caveats. The mandate issued by the Spanish Parliament did not allow Spanish forces either to engage Taliban insurgents unless being directly attacked first or to move into the south and east of Afghanistan. 102 Spanish soldiers were killed in Afghanistan. Spain has rejected three times to lead the ISAF when its shift to do so has come.

==== Turkey ====
Turkey's responsibilities included providing security in Kabul (it led RC Capital), as well as in Wardak Province, where it led PRT Maidan Shahr. Turkey was once the third largest contingent within the ISAF. Turkey's troops were not engaged in combat operations and Ankara long resisted pressure from Washington to offer more combat troops. In December 2009, Turkish Prime Minister Tayyip Erdogan said that "Turkey has already done what it can do by boosting its contingent of soldiers there to 1,750 from around 700 without being asked".

==== United Kingdom ====
Troops were deployed in Helmand Province under Operation Herrick. The Royal Air Force and Army Air Corps had a major presence in and around the country, including attack aircraft, C‑130 Hercules cargo planes, CH‑47 Chinook transport helicopters, Nimrod surveillance planes, Westland Lynx utility helicopters and Westland WAH-64 Apache attack helicopters. They were officially there to help train Afghan security forces, facilitate reconstruction, and provide security. In 2006, the situation in the north of Helmand turned increasingly violent, with British troops involved in fierce firefights against the Taliban and anti-coalition militia, particularly in the towns of Sangin, Musa Qala, Kajaki and Nawzad. According to the BBC, on 30 November 2009, Gordon Brown announced an increase in British troop numbers, which would bring the total to 10,000 personnel (500 extra ground troops, and 500 Special Forces); additionally, more modified Merlin helicopters would be deployed. The deployment would mean British troop levels in the theatre would be the highest since the invasion in 2001. The United Kingdom contributed the most troops to the mission after the United States and was involved in the fiercest fighting. As a result, 456 personnel were killed fighting in Afghanistan, and over 2000 wounded.

==== United States ====
The United States was the largest contributor to ISAF and served as its lead nation throughout the mission. At its peak in 2010–2011, U.S. troop strength exceeded 100,000 personnel, accounting for more than half of all ISAF forces. U.S. forces operated across all regional commands, with primary responsibility for Regional Command East and, later, Regional Command South and South-West.

The United States provided the majority of ISAF's combat power, air assets, intelligence, surveillance and reconnaissance (ISR), logistics, and funding. U.S. commanders frequently held senior ISAF leadership positions, including ISAF Commander and Commander, U.S. Forces–Afghanistan (USFOR-A).

U.S. operations were conducted initially under Operation Enduring Freedom, transitioning to a NATO-led ISAF framework and later to the Resolute Support Mission in 2015. The United States sustained the highest number of casualties among coalition members, with over 2,400 personnel killed during the conflict.

=== Euro-Atlantic Partnership Council (EAPC) nations ===
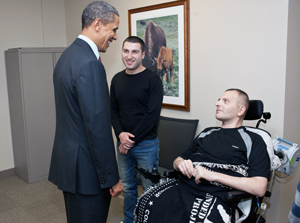
U.S. President Barack Obama visiting wounded Georgian LTC Alexandre Tugushi.

- Armenia – Armenia sent about 40 troops to serve under German command. Additional 86 troops deployed since summer 2011.
- Austria – Deployed in Kabul. In 2002, 75 soldiers have temporarily deployed in Kabul, and in the year 2005 a contingent of 100 soldiers served in Afghanistan.
- Azerbaijan – The mission of the armed forces in Afghanistan began on 20 November 2002. 94 Azerbaijani soldiers, 2 military doctors, and 2 engineering officers participated a decade later in the peacekeeping mission in Afghanistan.
- Bosnia and Herzegovina
- Finland – Stationed in four provinces around Mazar-i-Sharif, as all of Finnish troops serve in the PRT Mazar-i-Sharif since early 2009. Two Finnish soldiers have been killed, and 9 have been injured in Afghanistan.
- Georgia – Predominantly tasked with peacekeeping and counterinsurgency operations in the volatile Helmand province, Georgia is the largest non-NATO, as well as largest per-capita, contributor to the ISAF. Since 2010, 31 Georgian servicemen have died, all in the Helmand campaign, and 435 wounded, including 35 amputees, as of July 2014. The first Georgian fatality occurred on 5 September 2010, when 28 years old Lieutenant Mukhran Shukvani was killed in a sniper attack and Corporal Alexandre Gitolendia was seriously wounded. The most recent deaths occurred on 7 June 2013, when a suicide attack using a truck bomb struck a Georgian base in Helmand Province. Previously, on 13 May 2013, three Georgian soldiers, Cpl. Alexander Kvitsinadze, Lower Sergeant Zviad Davitadze and Cpl. Vladimer Shanava, were killed after a terrorist incursion and an accompanying suicide attack on the 42nd Battalion military base, also in Helmand.
- Ireland – Ireland provided 7 troops on six-month deployments from the Defence Forces, mainly as trainers, medical staff, and experts from its bomb disposal units.
- North Macedonia – The Republic of North Macedonia (then Republic of Macedonia/Former Yugoslav Republic of Macedonia) began its participation in the NATO-led ISAF operation in August 2002, with the sending of two officers as part of the Turkish contingent. In March 2003, the Macedonian army increased its contribution to the ISAF mission by sending one section from the composition of the 2nd Infantry Brigade as part of the German contingent. As a result of the successful carrying out of the mission and the high marks received for participation in ISAF, from August 2004 until the end of 2006, the ARM participated with one mechanized infantry platoon from the Leopard unit. At the same time, in August 2005 medical personnel were sent to ISAF as part of the Combined Medical Team in the A3 format (Macedonia, Albania, Croatia), which successfully carried out tasks at the Kabul airport, firstly in the composition of the Greek Field Hospital, and later in the composition of the Czech Field Hospital. In June 2006 sent also one mechanized infantry company, part of the first mechanized infantry brigade, in the composition of the British contingent in ISAF. In the second rotation of the company for securing the ISAF command, Macedonia increased the participation from ninety to one hundred and twenty-seven participants, and from January 2008 it sent three staff officers to the ISAF Command in Kabul. As a support to the efforts for self-sustainability of the Afghanistan National Army (ANA), beginning in March 2008, Macedonia sent soldiers as part of the Combined Multinational Operational Mentor and Liaison Team (OMLT) in Mazar-i-Sharif while, beginning from December 2008, in cooperation with Norway, a Macedonian medical team is included through one Surgical team in the organizational structure of the surgical unit of the Norwegian Provincial Reconstruction Team (PRT) in Meymanah, Afghanistan.
- Russia – Russia provided a field hospital as well as a hospital in Kabul for allies and Afghan civilians. Russia has also agreed to provide logistic support for the United States forces in Afghanistan to aid in anti-terrorist operations. Russia allowed US and NATO forces to pass through its territory to go to Afghanistan. Russian Special Forces also assisted US and Afghan forces in operations in Afghanistan, by helping with intel and studying the lay of the land.
- Switzerland – On 23 February 2008, the Swiss Ministry of Defence announced that its small deployment had concluded two weeks prior. Two officers had worked alongside German troops in the PRT responsible for the northeastern Kunduz province. The stated reason for the withdrawal was the burden placed on other troops for their protection, which had begun to hinder operations. A total of 31 Swiss soldiers were sent to Afghanistan since the beginning of their country's participation in 2003.
- Sweden – Sweden leads the PRT Mazar-i-Sharif. The main force consists of three mechanized companies operating in Mazar-i-Sharif and also includes helicopters for medical evacuation and an OMLT training Afghan soldiers. Five Swedish Soldiers have been killed in action and 20+ wounded since 2001. Over time, the Swedish force consisted of up to 891 troops, 9 CV9040, 20 Patria XA-203, 60+ BAE RG32M and 2 Super Puma Medevac helicopters.
- Ukraine – Mostly military doctors serving in the Lithuanian-led PRT Chagcharan, while one officer works at the ISAF HQ in Kabul.

=== Non-NATO and non-EAPC nations ===
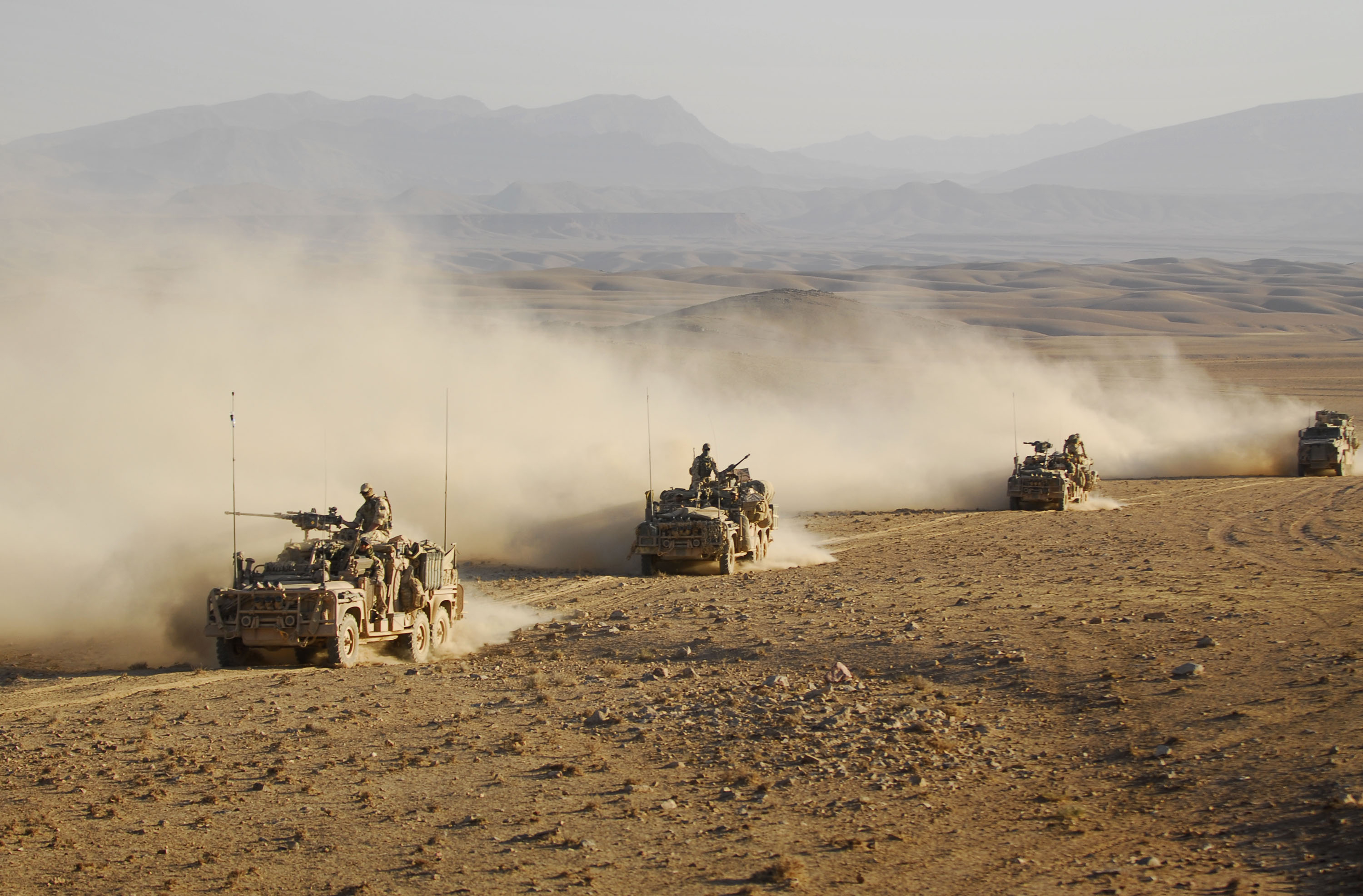
An Australian Special Operations Task Group patrol in October 2009.

- Australia – Australia was one of the largest non-NATO contributors to the War in Afghanistan. Called Operation Slipper, the core of the Australian contingent was based in the southern province of Uruzgan. Australia had joint command of Uruzgan Province with the United States (Combined Team Uruzgan). Australia provided the majority of combat forces in Uruzgan. This included an infantry-based Battle Group known as the Mentoring Task Force, which also includes cavalry, engineers, artillery, and other supporting assets. The Battle Group's main effort is Operational Mentoring and Liaison Teams (OMLTs), which are embedded with Afghan National Army units at remote Combat Outposts and Forward Operating Bases. The OMLTs conduct almost daily patrolling in the Green Zone with the Afghan National Army and have been involved in the heaviest combat experienced by regular Australian Defence Force members since the Vietnam War. Australia also contributed a 300-strong Special Operations Task Group, code-named Task Force 66, manned by the Special Air Service Regiment, 2nd Commando Regiment and 1st Commando Regiment. Task Force 66 operated in Uruzgan, Helmand, Zabul, and other surrounding provinces, and had significant success in both capturing and inflicting large numbers of casualties against the Taliban. Australian Army CH-47D Chinook heavy-lift helicopters served in Afghanistan as coalition heavy-lift transport helicopters, and the Royal Australian Air Force also committed C17 Globemaster and C130 Hercules transport aircraft, AP-3C Orion surveillance aircraft, and unmanned aerial vehicles. 42 Australian soldiers were killed and another 256 were wounded in action.
- Bahrain
- El Salvador
- Jordan – Jordanian troops were deployed in December 2001 to establish a 50‑bed medical facility in Mazar-i-Sharif. According to the US Department of Defense, the hospital provided care for up to 650 local patients a day, and as of February 2006, over 500,000 people had been treated by the Jordanians.
- Malaysia
- Mongolia – Mongolia sent troops to back the U.S. surge in the country. Some soldiers protect Camp Eggers while others serve as trainers for the Afghan National Army.
- New Zealand – New Zealand deployed an undisclosed number of NZSAS and regular troops to crew the Provincial Reconstruction Team (New Zealand) in Bamiyan to assist the United States. The troops were supplied by Royal New Zealand Air Force Lockheed C-130 and Boeing 757 transport aircraft and later in the deployment a quantity of NZLAV armoured fighting vehicles were sent to supplement the force. 10 soldiers were killed during the deployment, several during the Battle of Baghak.
- Singapore – The Singapore Armed Forces deployed close to 500 personnel to Afghanistan since May 2007 as part of Singapore's contributions to multinational stabilization and reconstruction efforts there. In May 2007, a five-man team was sent to central Afghanistan to set up a dental clinic serving local citizens, while training Afghans in dentistry so that they could eventually assume responsibility. Other contributions included a UAV team and a Weapons Locating Radar to provide rocket-launch warnings for Camp Holland.
- South Korea – The first South Korean contingent had been withdrawn by 14 December 2007 due to the expiration of its mandate, despite American calls for its continued presence. The withdrawal had been one of the pledges made to the Taliban captors of 21 South Korean Christian missionaries in July 2007, in return for the hostages' release. The deployment consisted of 60 medics comprising the 'Dongeui unit and 150 military engineers forming the 'Dasan' unit at Bagram Airbase, north of Kabul. They had been sent to Afghanistan in 2002 and 2003 respectively. Afterward, Seoul took only the role of providing medical and vocational training by assisting the United States with only two dozen volunteers working inside Bagram Air Base, north of Kabul. According to an ISAF statement, on 30 June 2008, South Korea returned, operating a small hospital near the airbase in Bagram with military and civilian personnel. In December 2009, the South Korean defence ministry announced it would send 350 troops in 2010 to protect South Korean civilian engineers working on reconstruction. These troops would not engage in any fighting except to protect the base of the South Korean Provincial Reconstruction Team (PRT) and escort and protect the activities of the PRT members. The South Korean contingent would be based in Parwan province, just north of Kabul for 30 months from 1 July 2010. This invoked threats from the Taliban. In a statement e‑mailed to international media, Taliban insurgents said Seoul must be ready to face "bad consequences" if the troops were deployed. The South Korean government said it made no promises to stay out of Afghanistan when it withdrew its troops in 2007. South Korea redeployed its troops to Afghanistan in July 2010, and was the PRT leading nation in Parwan Province. Korea also dispatched 4 UH‑60 Black Hawks, which came under the tactical control of the 3rd US Infantry Division.
- Tonga
- United Arab Emirates – The UAE had 170 soldiers serving in Tarin Kowt province in March 2008.

== Financing ==
Under Resolution 1386 of the United Nations Security Council, expenditures for ISAF were to be borne by participating states through a specially created trust fund, to which all U.N. Member States were encouraged to contribute.

== See also ==
- Afghanistan Mission Network
- Resolute Support Mission
- Canadian Forces casualties in Afghanistan
- Coalition casualties in Afghanistan
- German Armed Forces casualties in Afghanistan
- NATO logistics in the Afghan War
- Participants in Operation Enduring Freedom
- List of ISAF installations in Afghanistan
