= United Nations Security Council Resolution 1413 =

UN Security Council Resolution 1413
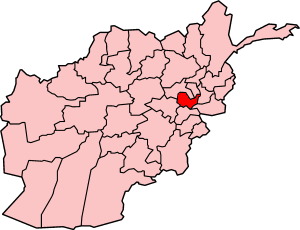
- Kabul Province in Afghanistan
- Date: 23 May 2002
- Meeting no.: 4,541
- Code: S/RES/1413 (Document)
- Subject: The situation in Afghanistan
- Voting summary: 15 voted for; None voted against; None abstained
- Result: Adopted

Security Council composition
- Permanent members: China; France; Russia; United Kingdom; United States
- Non-permanent members: Bulgaria; Cameroon; Colombia; Guinea; Ireland; Mauritius; Mexico; Norway; Singapore; Syria

United Nations Security Council resolution 1413, adopted unanimously on 23 May 2002, after reaffirming all resolutions on the situation in Afghanistan, particularly Resolution 1386 (2001) and resolutions 1368 (2001) and 1373 (2001) on terrorism, the council extended the authorisation of the International Security Assistance Force (ISAF) for an additional six months beyond 20 June 2002.

The security council recognised that the responsibility for providing security and law and order throughout Afghanistan resided with Afghans themselves. It appreciated the leadership of the United Kingdom for ISAF and the contributions of many nations to the force. Meanwhile, it noted Turkey's offer to assume the lead of ISAF. The council also determined the situation in Afghanistan to be a threat to international peace and security and required ISAF to fulfil its mandate.

Acting under Chapter VII of the United Nations Charter, the council extended the authorisation for ISAF in and around the capital Kabul for a further six months until 20 December 2002, and for all nations participating in ISAF to use all necessary measures to fulfil its mandate. States were called upon to provide personnel, equipment and other resources to ISAF and the voluntary trust fund.

Finally, the leadership of ISAF was required to submit monthly reports on the implementation of its mandate.

== See also ==
- Bonn Agreement
- War in Afghanistan (1978–present)
- List of United Nations Security Council Resolutions 1401 to 1500 (2002–2003)
- United Nations Assistance Mission in Afghanistan
- War in Afghanistan (2001–present)
