= Train Advise Assist Command – Air =

Train, Advise and Assist Command – Air (TAAC – Air)
- Active: 1 January 2015 - 2021
- Role: Training
- Garrison/HQ: Resolute Support
- Website: TAAC – Air

Train Advise Assist Command – Air (TAAC – Air) was a multinational military formation, part of NATO's Resolute Support Mission within Afghanistan.

Contributing nations included Australia, Croatia, Czech Republic, Denmark, Germany, Greece, Hungary, Romania, Slovakia, Sweden, Turkey, United Kingdom, and the United States of America.

== Commanders ==
- Brigadier Gen. Michael D. Rothstein (August 2014 - 27 July 2015)
- Brigadier Gen. Christopher E. Craige (July 2015 - June 2016)
- Brigadier Gen. Phillip A. Stewart (June 2017 - June 2018)
- Brigadier Gen. Joel L. Carey (June 2018 - June 2019)
- Brigadier Gen. Jeffery D. Valenzia (June 2019 - March 2020)

== Major units assigned ==
- 438th Air Expeditionary Wing, Forward Operating Base Oqab, Kabul
- 438th Air Expeditionary Advisory Group, Kabul Air Wing
- 738th Air Expeditionary Advisory Group, Kandahar Air Field

== See also ==
- Train Advise Assist Command – Capital
- Train Advise Assist Command – North
- Train Advise Assist Command – East
- Train Advise Assist Command – South
- Train Advise Assist Command – West
