= NATO Air Training Command – Afghanistan =

- Active: 2010–2015
- Anniversaries: September 8, 2010

Commanders
- Notable commanders: David Allvin, Timothy Ray, Steven Shepro John Michel, Michael Rothstein,

NATO Air Training Command – Afghanistan (NATC-A) was a NATO command, subordinate to NATO Training Mission – Afghanistan (NTM-A), whose mission was to train the Afghan Air Force; it was activated in September 2010, alongside the simultaneous deactivation of its predecessor, the Combined Air Power Transition Force (CAPTF). This reflected a change from a primarily US-led and staffed mission to one that encompassed many other NATO countries.

NATC-A was in turn replaced by Train, Advise, Assist Command – Air (TAAC-Air) in January 2015, as the NATO mission in Afghanistan transitioned from the International Security Assistance Force to the Resolute Support Mission.

== Mission ==
The NATC-A mission was to "set the conditions for a professional, fully independent and operationally capable Afghan 'air force' that meets the security requirements of Afghanistan today ... and tomorrow." NATC-A worked to rebuild and modernize the Afghan Air Force and served as the air component of the US-led, international NATO Training Mission – Afghanistan.

NATC-A worked to develop the Afghan Air Force (AAF) and the Ministry of Interior Affairs's Air Interdiction Unit (renamed in 2012 to Special Mission Wing) to provide aviation support to the wider Afghan National Security Forces (ANSF). Specifically, the AAF primarily supported the Afghan National Army, while the Air Interdiction Unit supported counter-narcotics and logistics support missions.

Initially NATC-A worked on four lines of operation to build airmen, aircraft, facilities and the institution of the AAF. As the AAF matured, these efforts evolved to strengthen the AAF institution, build AAF resource stewardship, forge a culture of safe standards, and advance AAF-led mission success.

== Contributing countries ==
NATO and non-NATO countries contributing personnel to NATC-A included Belgium, Canada, Croatia, Czechia, Denmark, El Salvador, Hungary, Italy, Latvia, Lithuania, Mongolia, Portugal, Ukraine, United Arab Emirates, United Kingdom and the United States.

== Locations ==
Most of the NATC-A headquarters staff was co-located and worked daily with the AAF headquarters staff to train and advise them at Kabul International Airport. The remaining staff was located at Camp Eggers (in downtown Kabul) to facilitate coordination and AAF development with NTM-A and the Afghan Ministry of Defense. Since the United States originally contributed most of the personnel and the NATC-A Commanding General was also dual-hatted as the 438th Air Expeditionary Wing Commander, NATC-A (and CAPTF before it) was organized along the U.S. Air Force's wing structure.

There were three subordinate groups, the 438th Air Expeditionary Advisory Group at Kabul International Airport; the 738th Air Expeditionary Advisory Group at Kandahar International Airport; and 838th Air Expeditionary Advisory Group at Shindand Air Base. Additionally, there were smaller detachments throughout Afghanistan. These locations mirror the locations of three AAF wings (Kabul Air Wing, Kandahar Air Wing and Shindand Air Wing) and geographically separated AAF units NATC-A trained, advised and equipped.

== Green-on-blue attacks ==
On April 27, 2011, nine NATC-A members were killed when one of the AAF members turned his weapon on the NATO advisors. They were Lt Col Frank Bryant, Maj Jeff Ausborn, Maj Dave Brodeur, Maj Phil Ambard, Maj Ray Estelle, Maj Charles Ransom, Capt Nate Nylander, MSgt Tara Jacobs Brown and LTC Jim McLaughlin (Ret). After this, some NATO personnel fulfilled the role of "guardian angels" to watch over those training their Afghan counterparts, and NATO rules of engagement evolved to increase personnel security. Additionally, the Afghan Ministry of Defense instituted a more rigorous process of vetting AAF personnel including biometric testing and establishing "counter-infiltration" units to root out possible Taliban agents or sympathizers.

== Significant achievements ==
On November 28, 2012, the commanders of the Afghan Air Force and NATC-A signed a "strategic flightplan". The strategy prioritized efforts along key transitional and operational goals:

· A strong, professional Afghan Air Force that successfully leads its missions and personnel
· Effective AAF resource management and stewardship
· A culture of safe and effective aviation, maintenance and support
· Afghan planned, led, and coordinated operations
