= 438th =

438th may refer to:

- 438th Air Expeditionary Advisory Group (438 AEAG), assigned to the 438th Air Expeditionary Wing of USAFCENT, stationed at Kabul Airport, Afghanistan
- 438th Air Expeditionary Group, provisional unit assigned to United States Air Forces Central to activate or inactivate as needed
- 438th Air Expeditionary Wing, an active United States Air Force unit operating in Afghanistan and assigned to United States Air Forces Central
- 438th Bombardment Squadron or 180th Airlift Squadron, unit of the Missouri Air National Guard 139th Airlift Wing located at Rosecrans Air National Guard Base, Missouri
- 438th Fighter-Interceptor Squadron, inactive United States Air Force unit

== See also ==
- 438 (number)
- 438, the year 438 (CDXXXVIII) of the Julian calendar
- 438 BC
