= Train Advise Assist Command – West =

Train Advise Assist Command – West (TAAC – West)
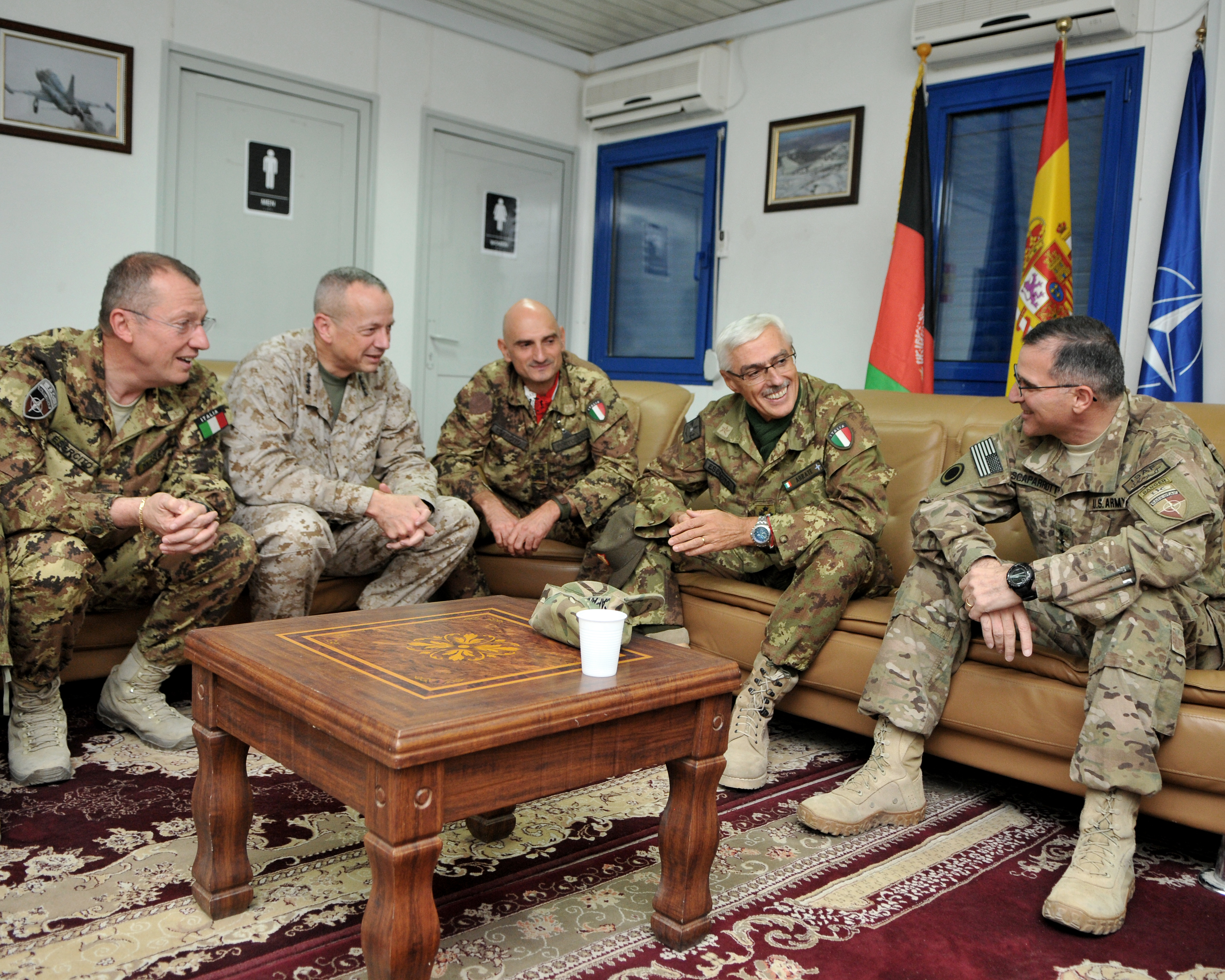
- Marine Gen. John R. Allen, commander of NATO's International Security Assistance Force (ISAF), and U.S. Army Lt. Gen. Curtis Scaparrotti, ISAF Joint Command commander, meet with the Italian Chief of the Defence Staff General Biagio Abrate and other Italian Army generals prior to the start of the Regional Command-West (RC-W) Transfer of Authority (TOA) ceremony in Herat province, Sept. 29, 2011.
- Role: Training
- Garrison/HQ: Herat
- Website: TAAC - West

Train Advise Assist Command – West (TAAC – West) was a multinational military formation, part of NATO's Resolute Support Mission within Afghanistan. It was previously called Regional Command West under the International Security Assistance Force (ISAF).

It was tasked with controlling Herat Province, Farah Province, Badghis Province and Ghor Province, which have a population of about 3,156,000 people. The formation was led by Italy.

== History ==
In May 2005 the ISAF Stage 2 expansion took place, doubling the size of the territory ISAF was responsible for. The new area was the former US Regional Command West consisting of Badghis, Farah, Ghor, and Herat Provinces.

On 9 October 2008 the Italian Brigadier General Paolo Serra took over command from his compatriot Brigade-General Francesco Arena.

There used to be four Provincial Reconstruction Teams (PRTs) under RC West:

- PRT Herat – located in Herat, Herat Province and led by Italy. This is currently the command and control (C2) headquarters and the forward support base for the formation (Slovenian PRT is part of Italian PRT)
- PRT Chaghcharan – located in Chaghcharan, Ghor and led by Lithuania
- PRT Farah – located in Farah, Farah Province and led by the United States
- PRT Qala-e Naw – located in Qala-e Naw, Badghis and led by Spain

Additional manoeuvre elements: In 2008, the Italian Army's contribution to ISAF and Operation Enduring Freedom peaked at 2,850 personnel. The Italian mission centered around the 2nd Alpini Regiment. Italy sent 411 troops, based on one infantry company from the 2nd Alpini Regiment tasked to protect the ISAF HQ, one engineer company, one NBC platoon, one logistic unit, as well as liaison and staff elements integrated into the operational chain of command.

- Task Force 45, about 200 operators, composed of Rangers of the 4th Alpini Paracadutisti Regiment, frogmen of the COMSUBIN, raiders of the 9° "Col Moschin" and operators from the 185° RRAO "Folgore" and special force from Air Force and Carabinieri operated with Delta Force and SAS in Farah province.

On September 18, 2006 Italian special forces, of Task Force 45 and the airborne troopers of the 'Trieste' infantry regiment of the Rapid Reaction Corps composed of Italian and Spanish forces, took part in 'Wyconda Pincer' operation in the districts of Bala Buluk and Pusht-i-Rod, in Farah province. Italian forces killed at least 70 Taliban.

== See also ==
- Shindand Air Base
- Train Advise Assist Command – Capital
- Train Advise Assist Command – North
- Train Advise Assist Command – East
- Train Advise Assist Command – South
- Train Advise Assist Command – Air
