= 538th Air Expeditionary Advisory Squadron =

- Active: 2008-2021
- Country: United States
- Branch: United States Air Force
- Role: Training
- Part of: United States Air Forces Central
- Garrison/HQ: Kabul International Airport

The 538th Air Expeditionary Advisory Squadron was provisional unit of United States Air Force. It was assigned to the 438th Air Expeditionary Wing, and was located at Kabul Airport, Afghanistan.

== Overview ==
The squadron was activated by United States Air Forces Central Command. The squadron was part of the air component of NATO's Train Advise Assist Command (TAAC-Air). It ceased operations in 2021 when USAF presence was withdrawn from Kabul Airport.

== History ==
=== Lineage ===
- Constituted as the 538th Air Expeditionary Advisory Squadron on 23 October 2008

Activated on 1 November 2008

=== Assignments ===
- 438th Air Expeditionary Advisory Group, 1 November 2008 – c. 2021

=== Stations ===
- Kabul Airport, Afghanistan, 1 November 2008 – c. 2021

=== Aircraft ===
- C-27A Spartan, c. 2008-c. 2013
- C-208, c. 2008-c. 2021
- C-130H Hercules, 2013-c. 2021
