= Train Advise Assist Command – North =

Train Advise Assist Command – North (TAAC – North)
- Role: Training
- Garrison/HQ: Mazar-i-Sharif
- Website: TAAC - North

Train Advise Assist Command – North (TAAC – North) was a multinational military formation, part of NATO's Resolute Support Mission within Afghanistan. Until 2014 it was designated Regional Command North, under the International Security Assistance Force.

== See also ==
- Train Advise Assist Command – Capital
- Train Advise Assist Command – East
- Train Advise Assist Command – South
- Train Advise Assist Command – West
- Train Advise Assist Command – Air
