= Michel Stollsteiner =

Retired French general

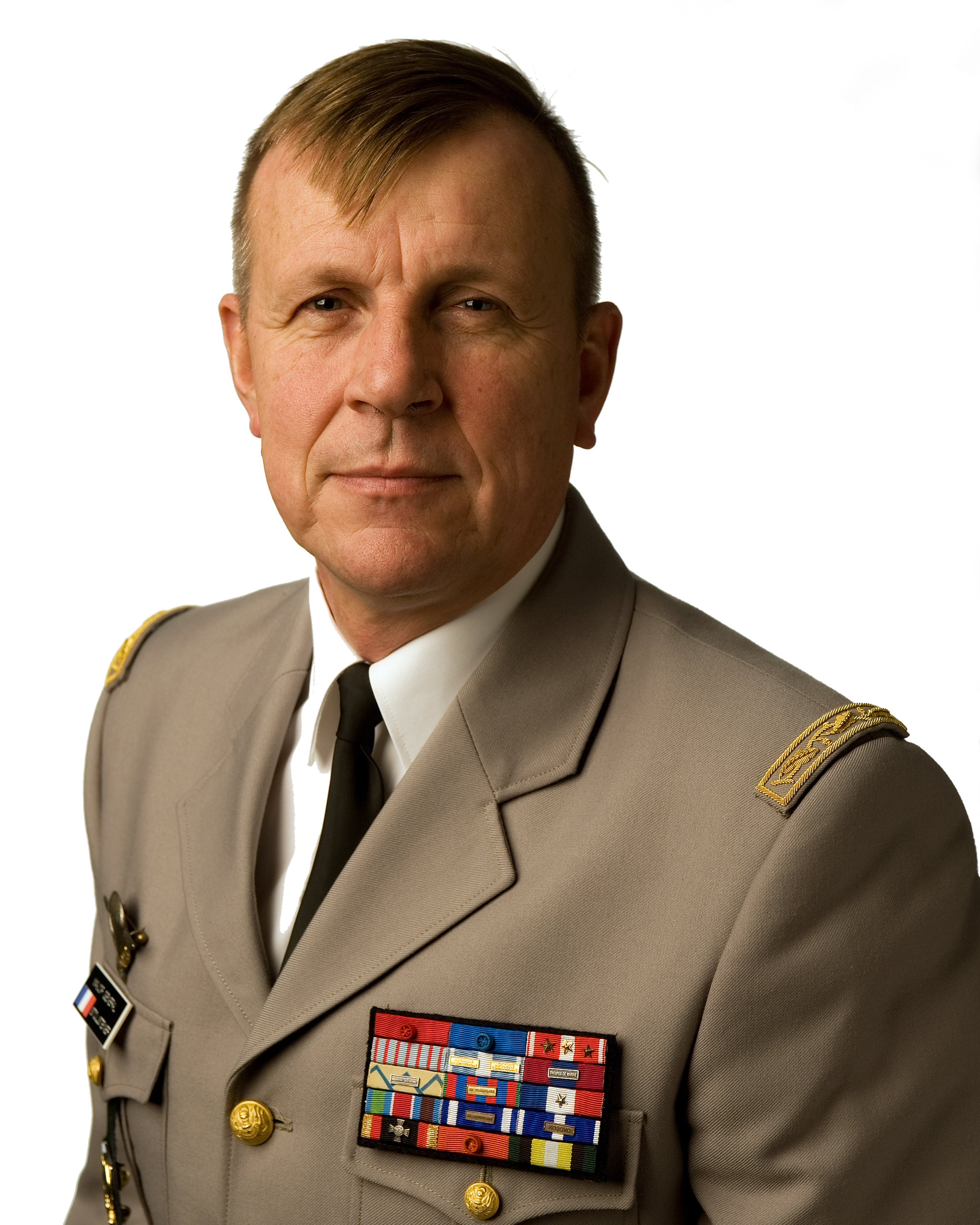
- Michel Stollsteiner in 2009
- Born: 26 January 1956 (age 70); Soissons, France
- Military career
- Allegiance: French Army
- Service years: 1975–2014
- Rank: Général de corps d'armée
- Commands: 8e RPIMa
- Conflicts: War in Afghanistan
- Awards: Officer of the Légion d'honneur

Michel Stollsteiner (born 26 January 1956 in Soissons, Aisne) is a retired French general. He was one of the five regional NATO commanders in Afghanistan, and was the highest-ranking French officer in Afghanistan between 6 August 2008 and 10 July 2009.

== Career ==
Stollsteiner joined the army in 1975, taking part in numerous operations in Africa (ex-Zaire, Centrafrique, Chad, Côte d'Ivoire) and in the Balkans (Sarajevo, Mitrovica), as well as in Afghanistan.

From 6 August 2008 to 10 July 2009, Stollsteiner served as a NATO regional commander in Afghanistan, heading the Regional Command Capital at Camp Warehouse, under US generals David D. McKiernan and Stanley A. McChrystal. He also served in the capacity of REPFRANCE, representing the french chief of defense staff in the Afghan theatre.

Stollsteiner supervised the sector where the Uzbin Valley ambush took place.

== Honours ==
- Commander of the Légion d'Honneur
- Commander of the Ordre du Mérite
