= NATO Training Mission – Afghanistan =

NATO Training Mission-Afghanistan
- Shoulder Sleeve Insignia
- Active: 2009–2014
- Type: Military advisor and training
- Role: Training the Afghan National Security Forces
- Part of: International Security Assistance Force
- Headquarters: Kabul
- Engagements: War in Afghanistan

Commanders
- Notable commanders: William B. Caldwell IV; Daniel P. Bolger; Kenneth E. Tovo

Insignia
- Combat Service Identification Badge

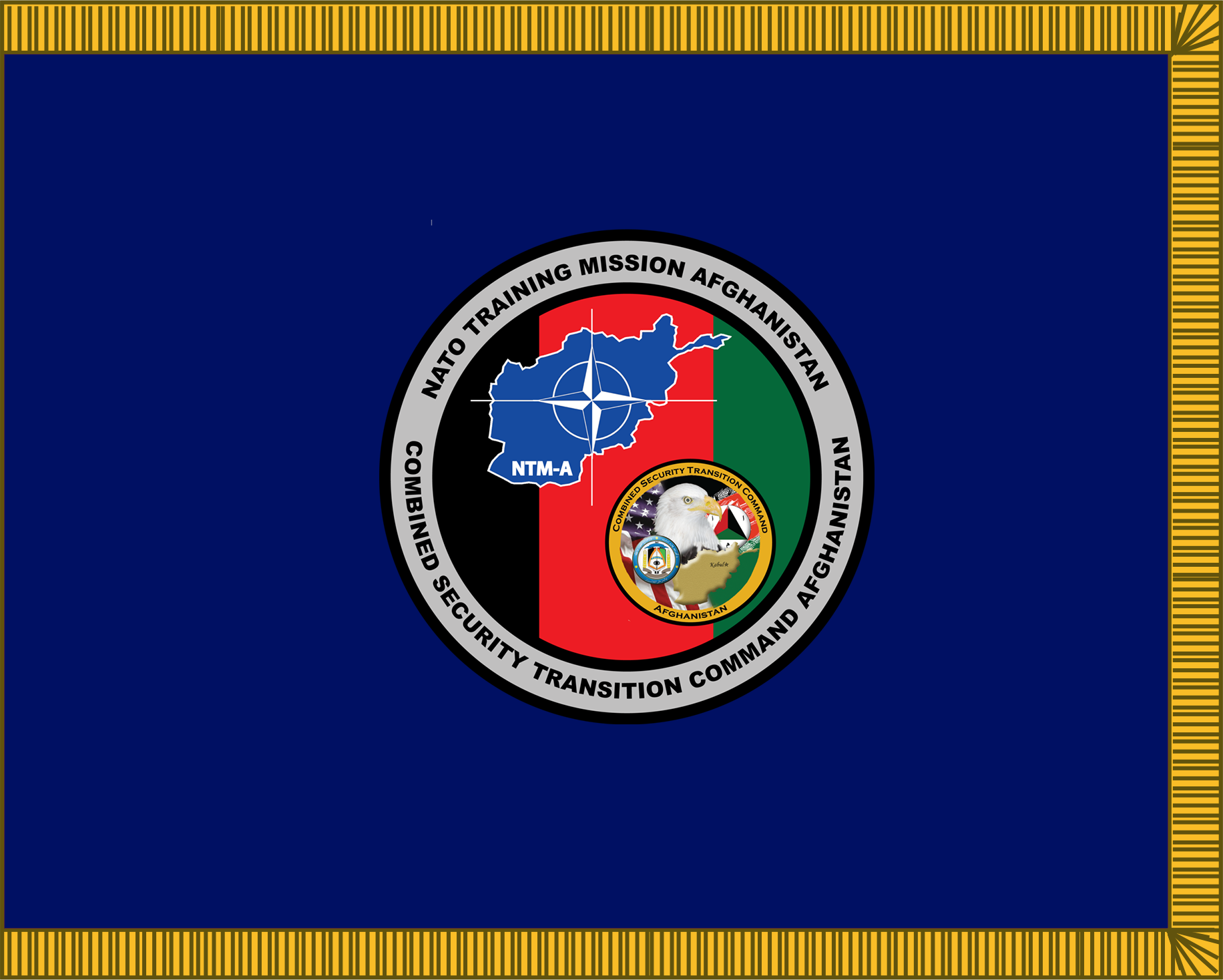
- NATO Training Mission Afghanistan Flag

The NATO Training Mission-Afghanistan (NTM-A) was a multinational military organisation, activated in November 2009, tasked with providing a higher-level training for the Afghan National Army (ANA) and Afghan Air Force (AAF), including defense colleges and academies, as well as being responsible for doctrine development, and training and advising Afghan National Police (ANP). The commanding officer was dual-hatted and commanded both NTM-A and Combined Security Transition Command – Afghanistan (CSTC-A) and reported to the Commander of ISAF.

Its mission was: "NTM-A/CSTC-A, in coordination with NATO Nations and Partners, International Organizations, Donors and NGO's (Non-Government Organizations); supports GIRoA (Government of the Islamic Republic of Afghanistan) as it generates and sustains the Afghan National Security Forces (ANSF), develops leaders, and establishes enduring institutional capacity in order to enable accountable Afghan-led security."

This reflected the Afghan government's policing priorities and complemented existing training and capacity development programs, including the European Union Police Mission and the work of the International Police Coordination Board.

During the 1960s to the early 1990s, the Afghan army was trained and equipped by the Soviet Union. By 1992 it fragmented into regional militias under local warlords. This was followed by the rule of the Taliban in 1996. After the removal of the Taliban in late 2001, the new Afghan armed forces were formed with the support of the United States and other NATO countries. From 2009, all training for the Afghan security forces was conducted by a single command.

== History ==
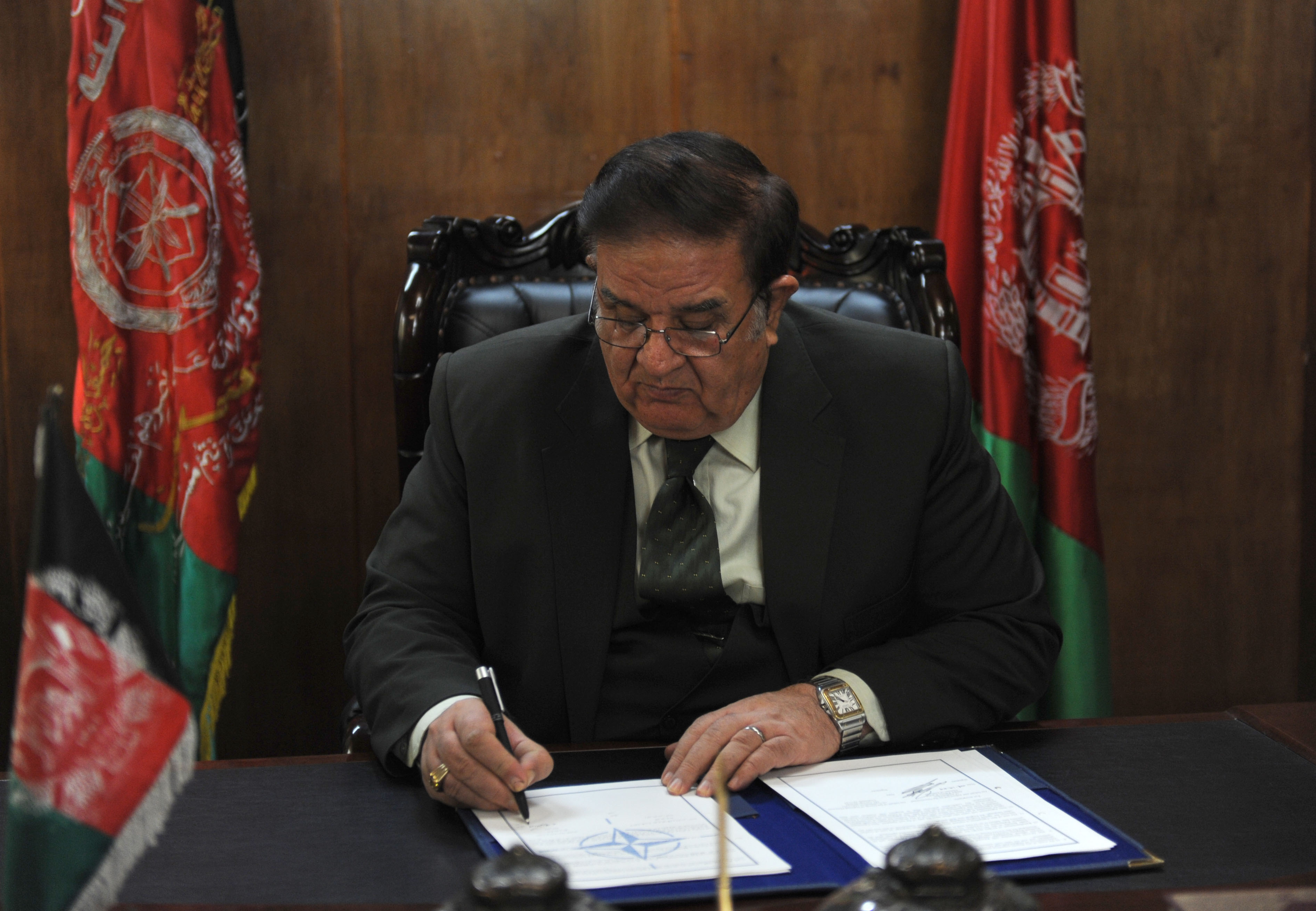
Afghan Defense Minister Abdul Rahim Wardak signing a NATO treaty in 2009.

Between 2002 and 2009, the Afghan National Police (ANP) received training under the Afghanistan Police Program. At a 2009 NATO Summit in Strasbourg-Kehl, while celebrating sixty years of peace and security within the alliance, NATO allies and partners, announced that they would establish a NATO Training Mission-Afghanistan, drawing on NATO's successful experience training in Iraq, to oversee higher level training for the Afghan National Security Forces (ANSF).

NTM-A, joined with CSTC-A on 21 November 2009 to create a comprehensive training program for Afghanistan, and a few days later NATO obtained commitments from allies for personnel and resources to train, mentor and equip the ANSF.

The mission of NTM-A was to oversee higher level training for the Afghan National Army (ANA) and training and mentoring for the ANP, and in coordination with CSTC-A, to plan and implement authorized and resourced operational capacity building for ANSF, in order to enhance the government of the Islamic republic's ability to achieve security and stability in Afghanistan.

As of December 2011, total manpower of the ANSF is over 290,000 and is expected to reach 400,000 by the end of 2014. Facilities and capacity planning efforts are rapidly adjusting to the significant increases in national recruiting efforts to meet manpower needs.

== Training ==
=== Afghan Armed Forces ===
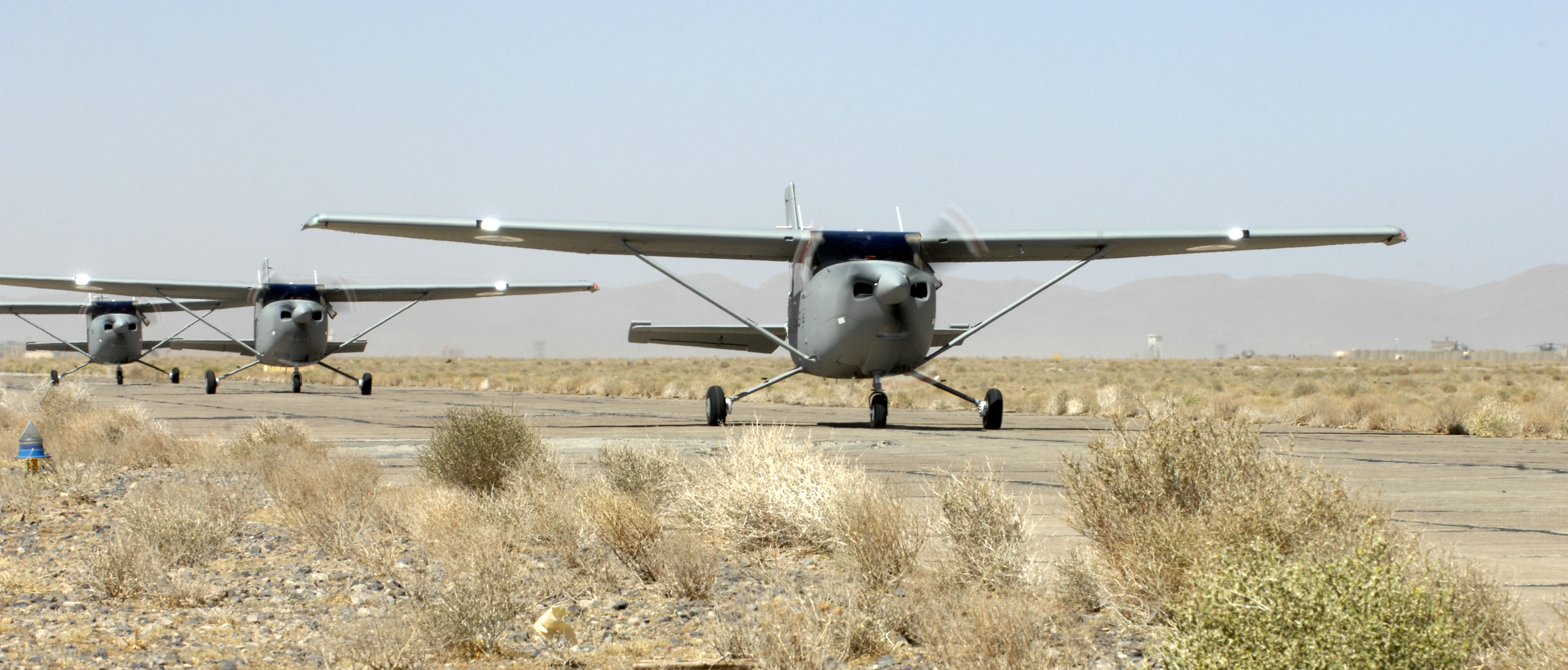
Ce182T trainers at Shindand Air Base, which serves as the main training center for the Afghan Air Force.

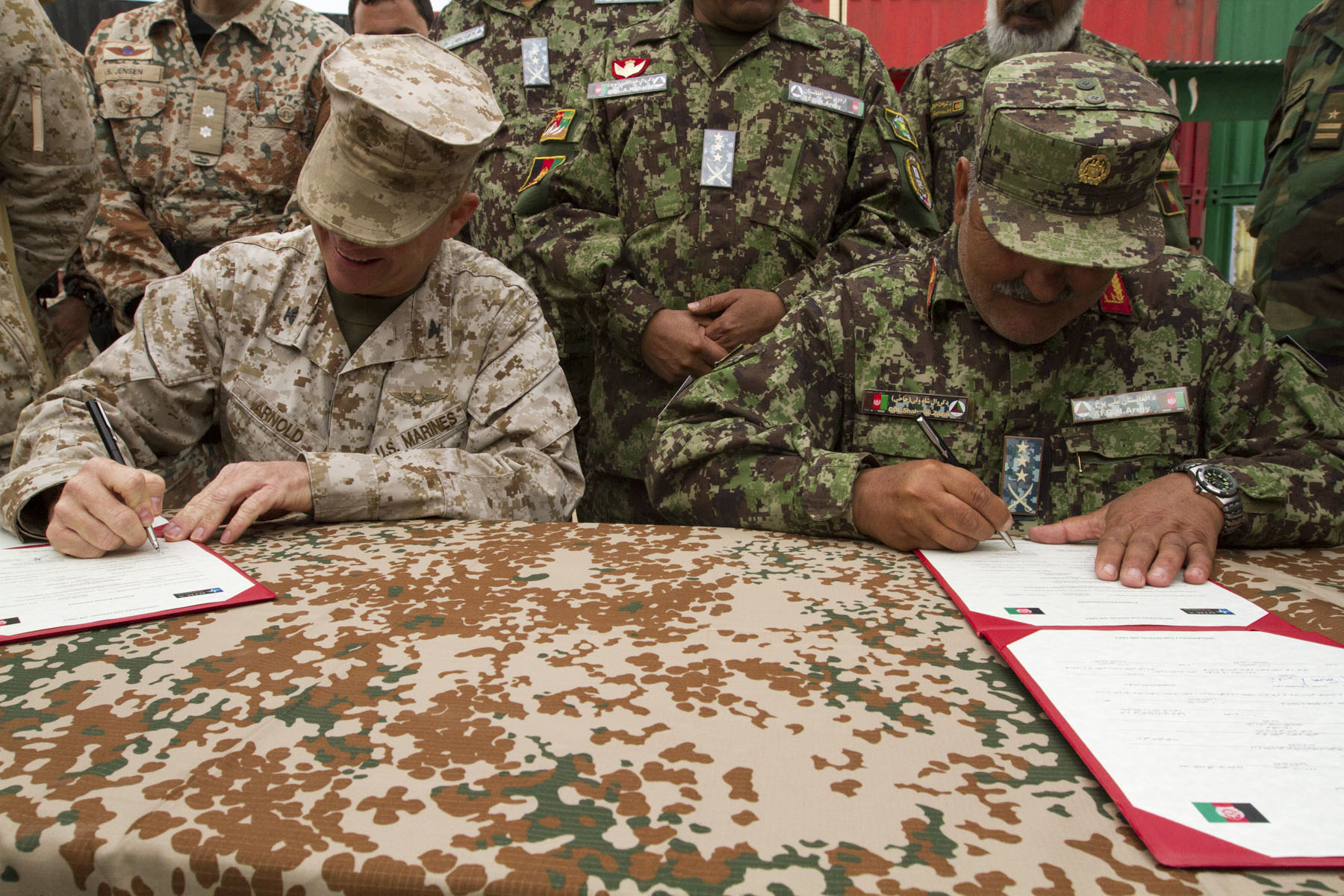
The Regional Military Training Center South West in Helmand Province, is being transitioned from coalition oversight to ANA. Prior to this, construction, maintenance and mentoring has been done by US, British and Danish forces.

Members of the coalition forces in Afghanistan have undertaken different responsibilities in the creation of the ANA and the Afghan Air Force (AAF). All these various efforts are managed on the Coalition side by NATO Training Mission - Afghanistan (NTM-A), a three-star level multi-national command headquartered in downtown Kabul.

Since 2006 all training and education done by the ANA, is managed and implemented by the Afghan National Army Training Command (ANATC) formed in 2005, a two-star command which reports directly to the Chief of the General Staff. The Kabul Military Training Center (KMTC) and six regional military training centres (RMTCs) as well as a number of specialist training schools are all under ANATC HQ. The coalition forces are partnered with the ANA to mentor and support formal training through Task Force Phoenix. This program was formalized in April 2003, based near the KMTC coordinating collective and individual training, mentoring, and Coalition Force support.

Each ANA HQ above battalion level has or had an embedded Operational Mentor and Liaison Team (OMLT) of NATO trainers and mentors acting as liaisons between ANA and ISAF. The OMLTs co-ordinate operational planning and ensure that the ANA units receive enabling support. Pending on the readiness of each HQ, they go through a transition, following which the international mentor team leaves the ANA organisation.

Formal education and professional development is currently conducted at two main ANATC schools, both in Kabul. The National Military Academy of Afghanistan, located near Kabul International Airport, is a four-year military university, which will produce degreed second lieutenants in a variety of military professions. NMAA's first cadet class entered its second academic year in spring 2006. The Command and General Staff College, located in southern Kabul, prepares mid-level ANA officers to serve on brigade and corps staffs. France established the CGSC in early 2004, and a cadre of French Army instructors continues to oversee operations at the school. A National Defense University will also be established at a potential site in northwestern Kabul. Eventually all initial officer training (to include the NMAA) as well as the CGSC will be re-located to the new NDU facility.

Individual basic training is conducted primarily by Afghan army instructors and staff at ANATC's Kabul Military Training Center, situated on the eastern edge of the capital. The Afghan armed forces are still supported, however, with various levels of CSTC-A oversight, mentorship, and assistance. The United States armed forces assist in the basic and advanced training of enlisted recruits, and also runs the Drill Instructor School which produces new training NCOs for the basic training courses.

The NATO Air Training Command-Afghanistan (NATC-A) trains, equips and advises the AAF. There were three NATC-A air expeditionary training groups embedded with AAF air wings at Kabul International Airport (where the AAF Kabul Air Wing), the Kandahar International Airport (where the AAF Kandahar Air Wing) and at Shindand Air Base (where the AAF Shindand Air Wing) are located as well as detachments at smaller AAF locations such as Herat. The NATO air advisors also serve as liaisons with various IJC regional commands to facilitate and deconflict AAF air missions. NATC-A also trains, equips and supports the ANP's Air Interdiction Unit as the AIU conducts counternarcotic and ANP logistics missions across Afghanistan. All these various efforts are managed on the Coalition side by a one-star level multi-national command headquartered at the Kabul International Airport (where the AAF is headquartered).

=== Afghan National Police ===
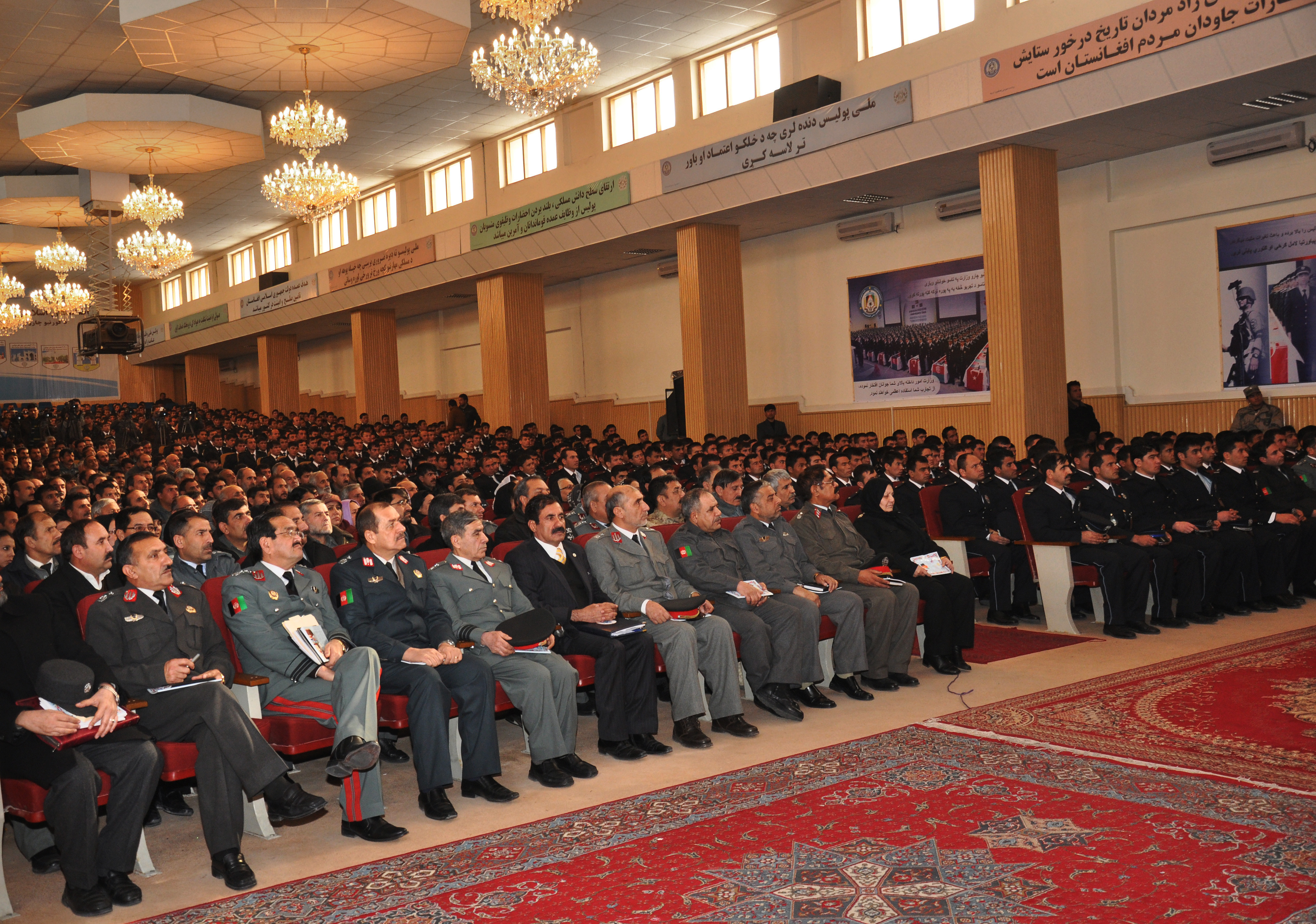
New graduates of the Afghan National Police (ANP) sitting at the Ministry of the Interior in Kabul.

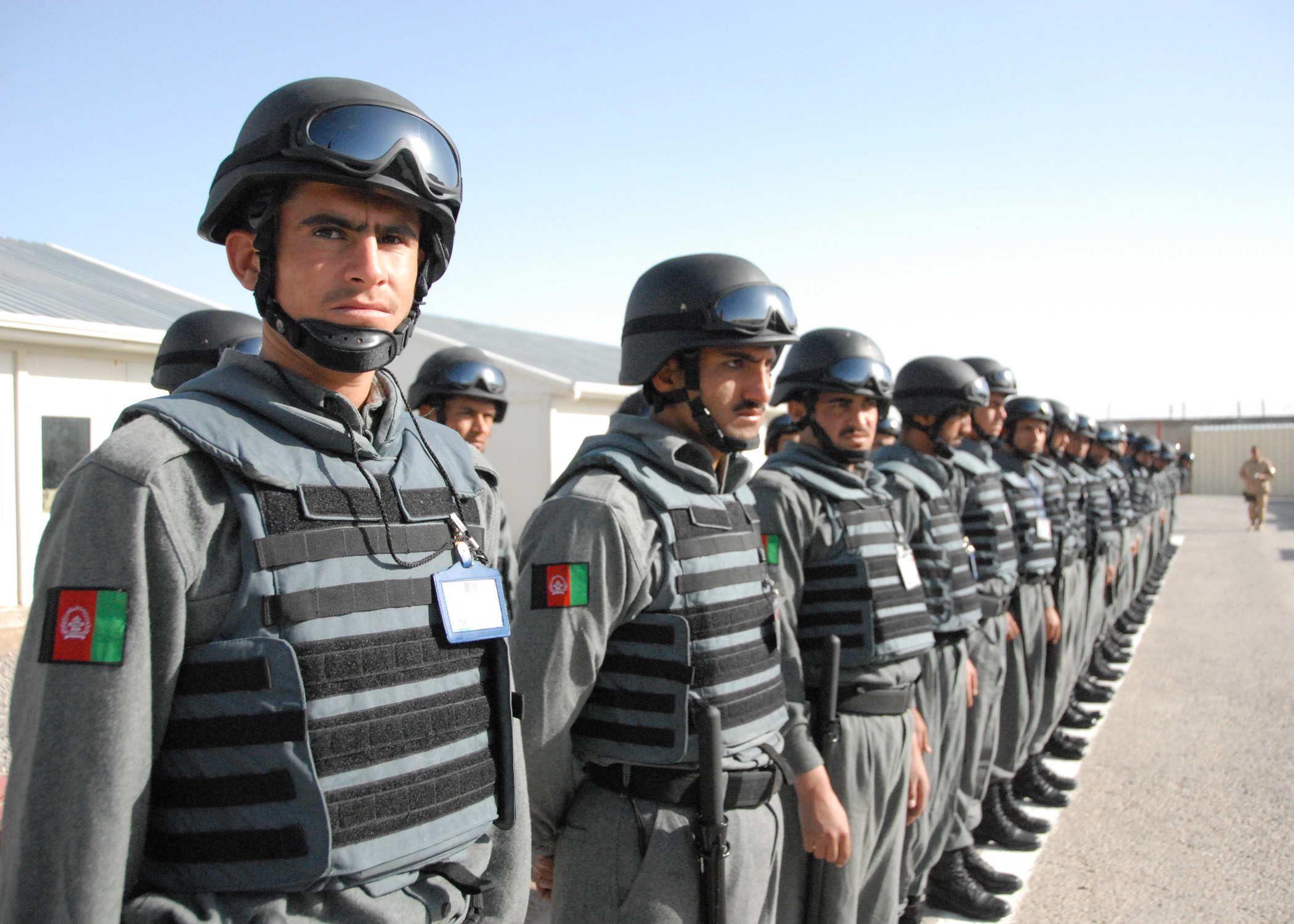
Members of the honor guard for the ANP at the Recruit Training Camp in Kandahar Province.

The Afghan National Police (ANP) program is the police part of the ANSF. The ANP will continue growing to a 160,000 police force comprising Afghan Border Police, Uniform Police, Afghan National Civil Order Police (ANCOP), Counter Narcotics Police, and Afghan Local Police (ALP). In 2009 the training requirement shifted from force production to sustainment of the force and professionalization of the force.

This will be accomplished by completing the border police end strength to 18,000 with 1,550 new border police completing basic training. ANCOP will reach its authorized level by training 2,100 new ANCOP policemen.

Basic training for 3,500 new Uniform Police is planned to stop attrition in the ANP. With the force at 126,000 the remaining training capability will be used for professional courses to include a new advanced police course projected to train 3,200 graduates of the basic police training. These courses are required to provide a professional force free from corruption that can enforce the Rule of Law.

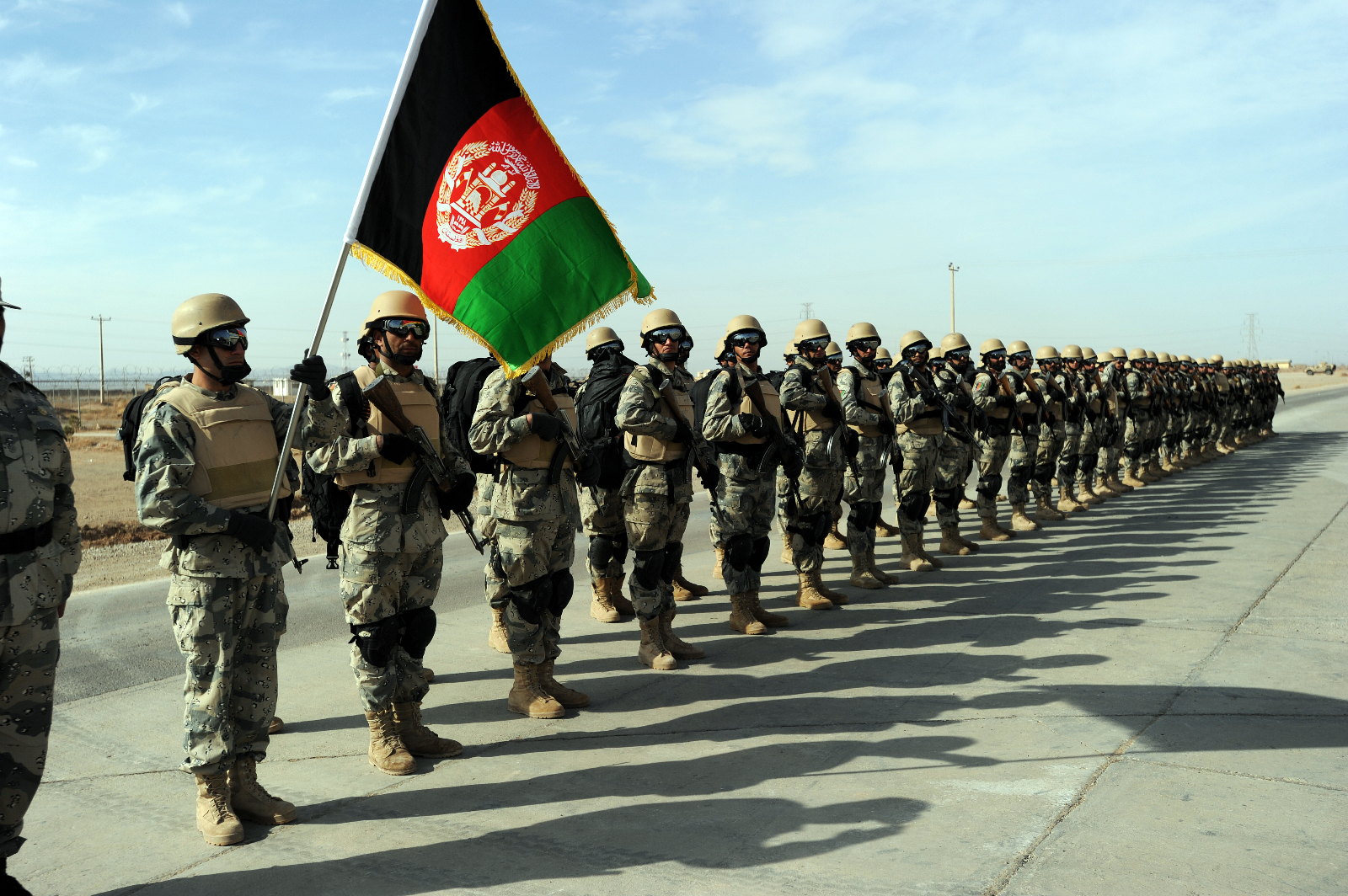
Afghan Border Police (ABP) in Herat Province.

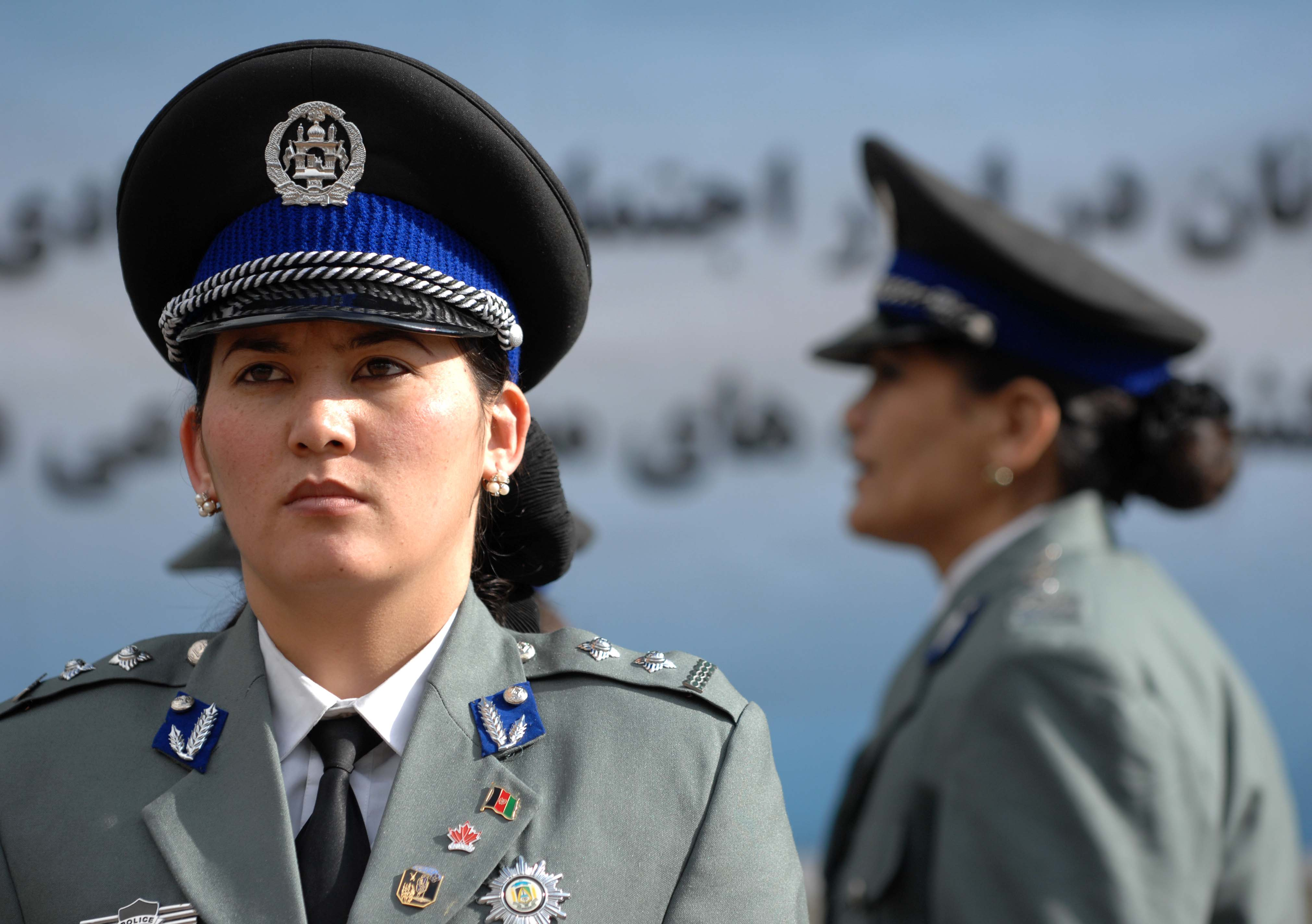
Female ANP officers stands at attention during a pass and review formation before the start of the International Women's Day ceremony at the Ministry of Interior in Kabul on March 4, 2010.

Specialized training courses such as: Bayman and Panshir Model Police, Justice and Corrections program, literacy program, criminal investigation division, counter terrorism program, Border Police training, Domestic violence, Sexual Assault, Professional standards Units, Family Assistance Unit, Trafficking in Persons Program, Senior Leadership English Language, Medic Training, TIP Courses, Tactical Training Program (SWAT), Public Order Program, FTO/PTP, Drivers Training and Records Identification Program. Provides for ANP Counter-Improvised Explosive Device (CIED) / Explosive Ordnance Disposal (EOD) initial training. These funds will train 16 eight man teams on IED defeat mechanisms.

The course will be a comprehensive three level training that will be used within the ANP units. The contract will include a complete train the trainer program to stand-up and train all CIED teams within the ANP and a team for the EOD School. Train-the-Trainer approach will allow reduction in mentors beginning in FY10. Combat medic training supports the ongoing operations, continuing development, and future expansion of the ANP Kabul Clinic, 4 Regional Clinics, and various other mini-clinics throughout the ANP area of responsibility.

Provides for attendance and training at the FBI Academy's Law Enforcement Executive Development Course, Police Partnership Training events and Passport Processing/Customs Training events. Preventive Medicine training sustains the long-term conservation platforms for the operating strength of the ANP. Program will teach personal hygiene and sanitation procedures to reduce the disease rate and potentially increase the daily strength available for operations.

Provides instructors and advisors to support a curriculum that will prepare recruits in specialized areas of law enforcement such as criminal investigation and special weapons and tactics. Includes instructors for the Afghan National Civil Order Police (ANCOP) National Training Facility at Adraskan. Because of the decades of turmoil in Afghanistan, there is a dearth of trained legal experts and legal staff that can step into the MoI's Legal Advisor department without significant remedial training provided in the program. The Fire Department Training Facility will train up to 450 per year. The Fire Department will need a dedicated training facility in Kabul providing initial, special and sustainment training for the Fire Departments across the country.

This budget item will provide for the construction of this specialized facility and training equipment and practical exercise "burn house" and well as first aid training and associated training aids. Program will, in conjunction with the MoI Staff, develop and publish needed doctrine for the Afghan National Police. These publications will include: policy and procedure manual, First Aid Publication, Fire Department Operations Manual, Criminal Investigation Field Manual, Border Police Operations Manual, Afghanistan National Civil Order Police Operations Manual, a Weapons Training Manual for Fire Arms Instructors, and a Field Training Officers (FTO) Manual.

These projects are to provide needed police doctrine while their production will enable the MoI to develop a fully functional doctrine section. Basic literacy remains a significant issue due to the low literacy rate of the adult. Literacy is required for advancement/promotion beyond Patrolman rank for all ANP organizations; English literacy is vitally important for senior ANP force leadership and bringing ANP organizations up to international standards. Initiates Dari/Pashto and Low Intensity English Literacy programs in each Regional/Zones beginning at Regional Command locations (Jalalabad, Gardez, Kandahar, Herat, and Mazar-e-Sharif).

==== ANP Training Facilities ====
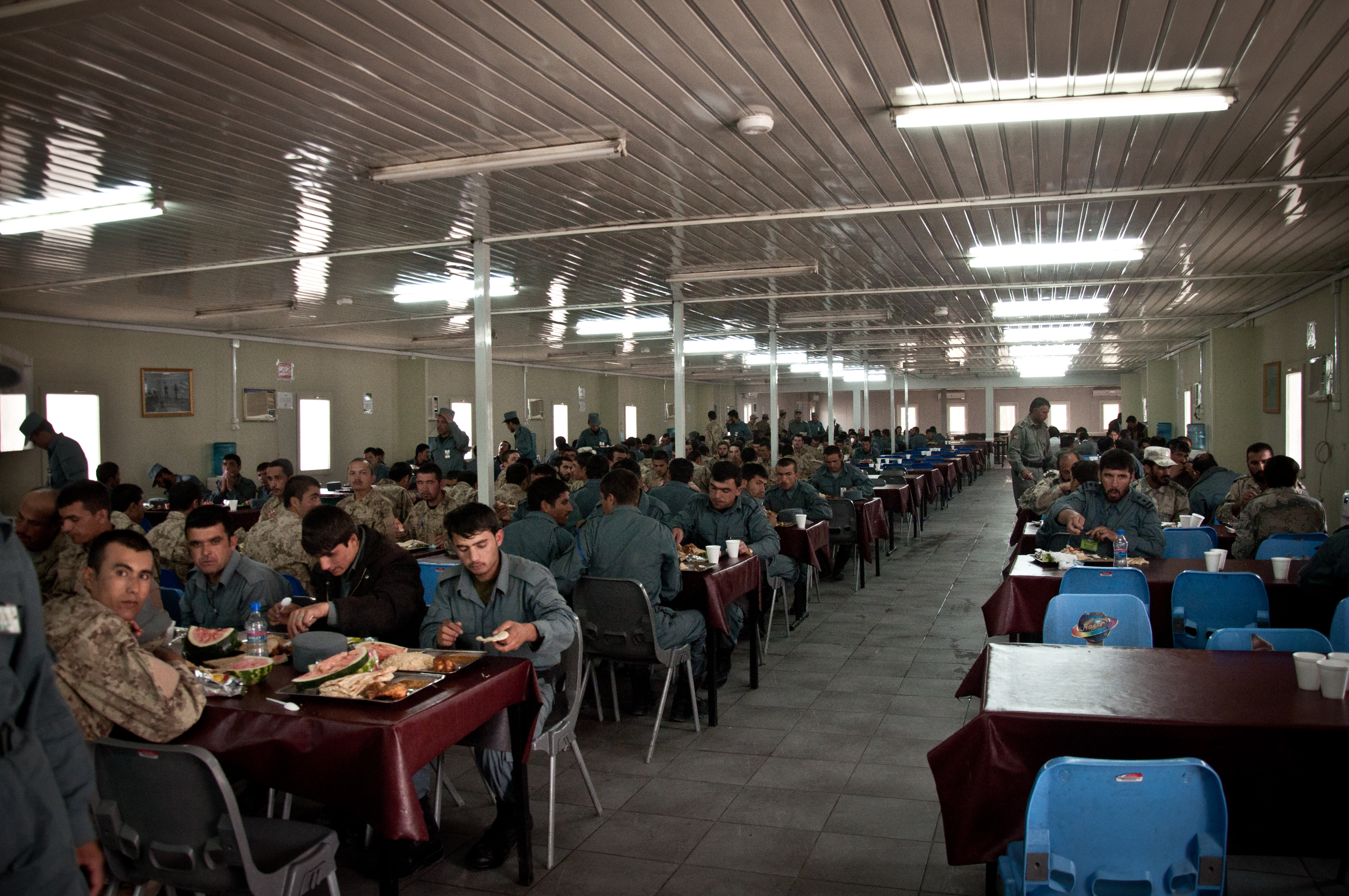
ANP cadets eating at the Kabul training center Student Dining Facility

Germans German Police Training Center at Mazar-e-Sharif, Balkh Province (400 capacity)
Turkey Turkish Police Training Center, Wardak Province (50 capacity)
Czech Republic Czech Police Training Center, Logar Province (90 capacity)
Italy Italian Carabinieri run Adraskan National Training Center, Herat Province (800 capacity)
United Kingdom British run Helmand Police Training Center, Helmand Province (150 capacity)
Canada Canadian run TSS Costall, Kandahar Province (200 capacity) The Canadians also run FOB Walton, Kandahar Province (200 capacity)
New Zealand Kiwi run Crime Scene Investigator school at RTC Bamiyan, Bamiyan Province (72 capacity)
France Gendarmerie initiative to run RLC Mazar-e-Sharif, Balkh Province (300 capacity); and Gendarmerie execution by 5 December 2009 for NCO to Officer (OCS) schooling
Netherlands Dutch built, U.S. run TSS Tarin Kwot, Uruzgan Province (150 capacity)

== Green-on-blue attacks ==
In 2012, according to NATO, 51 coalition service members died due to the deliberate actions of members of the Afghan forces. Another 65 NATO soldiers were killed in insider attacks between 2007 and 2011. The increase in so called "green-on-blue attacks" prompted U.S. officials to revamp the screening process of potential Afghan recruits as Afghan military leadership identified "hundreds" of Afghan soldiers within their ranks who were linked to the Taliban insurgency or harbored anti-American views.

Most of the attackers in these incidents were members of the special Afghan Local Police (ALP) units, who operated as a local tribal force and were known to have ties to the Taliban. They were are also known to use drugs and were sometimes reported for abusing civilians.

The Long War Journal reported on such attacks, counting 155 since 2008 to 11 June 2017, resulting in 152 Coalition dead and 193 wounded. ANA fighters sometimes fled to the Taliban, which posted videos 'welcoming' the fleeing fighters. NATO commanders initially stated that an estimated 90% of the attacks are due to cultural differences and personal enmity while the Afghan government disagreed with NATO’s analyst and blamed the problem on “infiltration by foreign spy agencies”, including those of “neighboring countries”.

== ISAF to Resolute Support ==
With the drawdown of forces, NTM-A was re-designated CJ7 and became a Staff Element under Headquarters ISAF in September 2014. CJ7 further reduced numbers as ISAF transitioned into Resolute Support.

== Unit Insignia ==
=== Shoulder Sleeve Insignia (SSI) ===
A shield-shaped embroidered device 3 3/4 inches (9.5 cm) in height and 2 inches (5.1 cm) in width within a 1/8 inch (0.32 cm) yellow border blazoned: Per quarter Azure and Celeste, with a fillet cross couped to base surmounted by an annulet charged with a polestar Argent. The polestar is faceted with the opposing facets in fess of the first and the opposing facets in pale of the second. Attached to the top are two Oriental Blue scrolls bordered Yellow, the top is inscribed "NTM-A" and the scroll below is inscribed "NATO-OTAN" in Black letters.

The blue and white are NATO colors and the polestar is the NATO emblem. NATO is North Atlantic Treaty Organization and OTAN is Organisation du traité de l'Atlantique Nord which is NATO in French. The addition of the darker blue quartering signifies the Afghanistan national treasure of lapis lazuli gems. The yellow border along with the polestar and the annulet signifies the excellence in the Coalition and Joint Forces. The shoulder sleeve insignia was approved on 3 November 2010.

=== Combat Service Identification Badge (CSIB) ===
A silver color metal and enamel device 2 inches (5.1 cm) in height consisting of a design similar to the shoulder sleeve insignia.

== Honors ==
=== Unit decorations ===
Ribbon	Award	Year	Notes
	Joint Meritorious Unit Award	2009–2010	For service in Afghanistan
	Joint Meritorious Unit Award	2010–2011	For service in Afghanistan
	Joint Meritorious Unit Award	2011–2012	For service in Afghanistan

== See also ==
- International Security Assistance Force
- Provincial Reconstruction Team
