= 738th Air Expeditionary Advisory Group =

- Airmen with the 738th Air Expeditionary Advisory Group launch rockets from an Mi-17 helicopter
- Active: 2009–2019
- Country: United States
- Branch: United States Air Force
- Role: Training host country units
- Part of: United States Air Forces Central Command
- Engagements: War in Afghanistan
- Decorations: Air Force Meritorious Unit Award; Air Force Outstanding Unit Award

Insignia
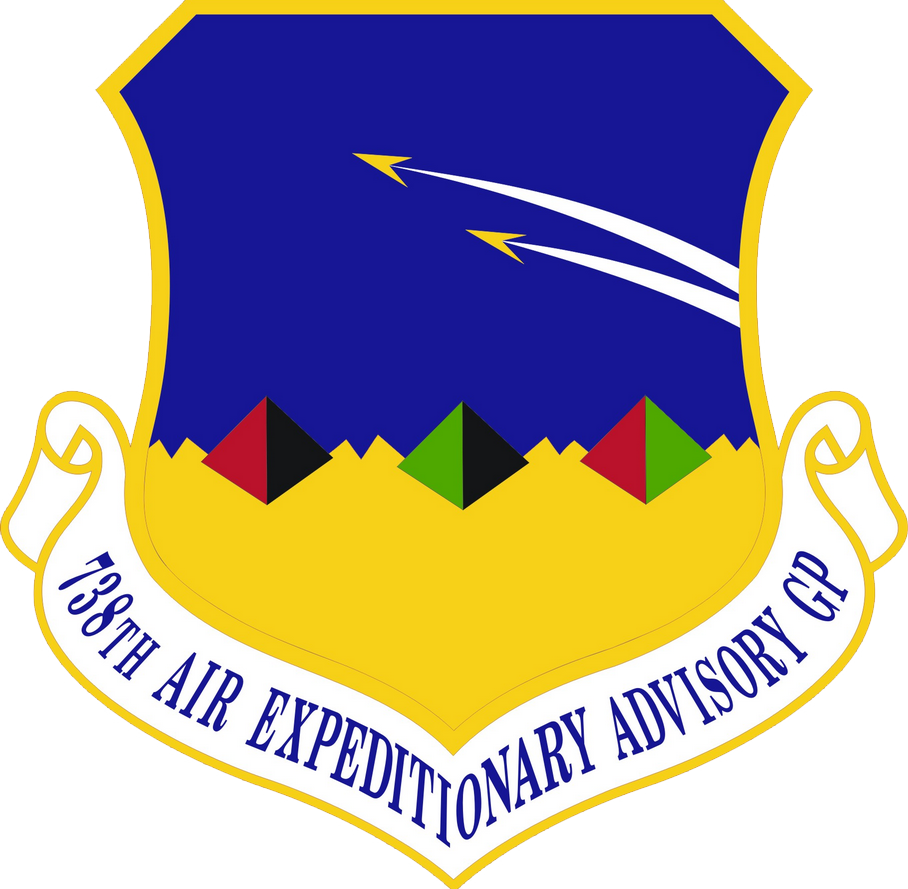
- 738th Air Expeditionary Advisory Group emblem (Note: The formation of aircraft with contrails signifies the unit's mission to work together with counterparts to become self-sufficient and embody the spirit of working shoulder-to-shoulder. The grouping of pyramids represents the aspects of the unit's mission to train, equip and advise their counterparts. The land and the sky together represent the goal of the unit's mission to create a self-sufficient AAF on the land and in the sky. 738th AEAG Fact Sheet.)

The 738th Air Expeditionary Advisory Group was a military advisor group of the United States Air Force, active from 2009-2019.

The 738th AEAG was activated on 29 November 2009 to include the NATO advisory support that had been established at Kandahar in the spring of 2008. It included airmen from the United States, Lithuania, Latvia, Ukraine, and Belgium. It was made up of three Air Expeditionary Advisory Squadrons operating out of Kandahar Airfield, Afghanistan.

The group's mission was to train the Afghan Air Force to be able to meet the security requirements of Afghanistan. As part of the 438th Air Expeditionary Wing, the 738th advised the Kandahar Air Wing, which operated in the southern regions of Afghanistan. The group also assisted the Kandahar Air Wing in counterinsurgency operations. Group advisers mentored their Afghanistan Air Force counterparts in flight operations, aircraft maintenance, intelligence, logistics, personnel management, communications and base defense.

The group's unit's included:

- 441st Air Expeditionary Advisory Squadron - the squadron was the operational training squadron of the 738th Air Expeditionary Advisory Group. The squadron trains members of the Afghanistan Air Force's Kandahar Air Wing on the wing's Mil Mi-17 helicopters and Cessna 208 Caravan aircraft.
- 442d Air Expeditionary Advisory Squadron - the 442d squadron had about 140 members, of whom about 100 were maintenance contractors from Ukraine, working for Lockheed Martin. The contractors perform maintenance and formal instruction, while the 40 military members advised senior leadership in the Kandahar Wing's maintenance group on logistics management. It focused on developing instructors within the Afghan Air Force to enable them to take over the training mission.
- 443d Air Expeditionary Advisory Squadron - the 443d Squadron provided mission support for the group and its assigned squadrons.

== Lineage ==
- Constituted as the 738th Air Expeditionary Advisory Group in provisional status on 23 November 2009

Activated on 25 November 2009
Inactivated on 14 September 2019

=== Assignments ===
- 438th Air Expeditionary Wing, 25 November 2009 – 14 September 2019

=== Components ===
- 441st Air Expeditionary Advisory Squadron, 25 November 2009 – 14 September 2019 (Note: The 441st, 442d and 443d Air Expeditionary Advisory Squadrons are not related to the 441st, 442d and 443d Air Expeditionary Squadrons.)
- 442d Air Expeditionary Advisory Squadron, 25 November 2009 – 14 September 2019
- 443d Air Expeditionary Advisory Squadron, 25 November 2009 – 14 September 2019

=== Aircraft ===
- Mil Mi-17 (2009–2019)
- Cessna 208 Caravan (2009–2019)
- MD-530 Cayuse Warrior (2012–2019)
- A-29 Super Tucano (2012–2019)
- UH-60 Black Hawk (2017–2019)

=== Awards ===
Award streamer	Award	Dates	Notes
	Air Force Meritorious Unit Award	1 May 2010 – 30 Apr 2011	
	Air Force Meritorious Unit Award	1 May 2011 – 30 Apr 2012	
	Air Force Meritorious Unit Award	1 October 2013 – 30 September 2014	
	Air Force Meritorious Unit Award	1 October 2014 – 30 September 2015	
	Air Force Meritorious Unit Award	1 Oct 2015 – 31 Mar 2017	
	Air Force Outstanding Unit Award	1 May 2011 – 30 Apr 2012	
