= 438th Air Expeditionary Wing =

438th Air Expeditionary Wing

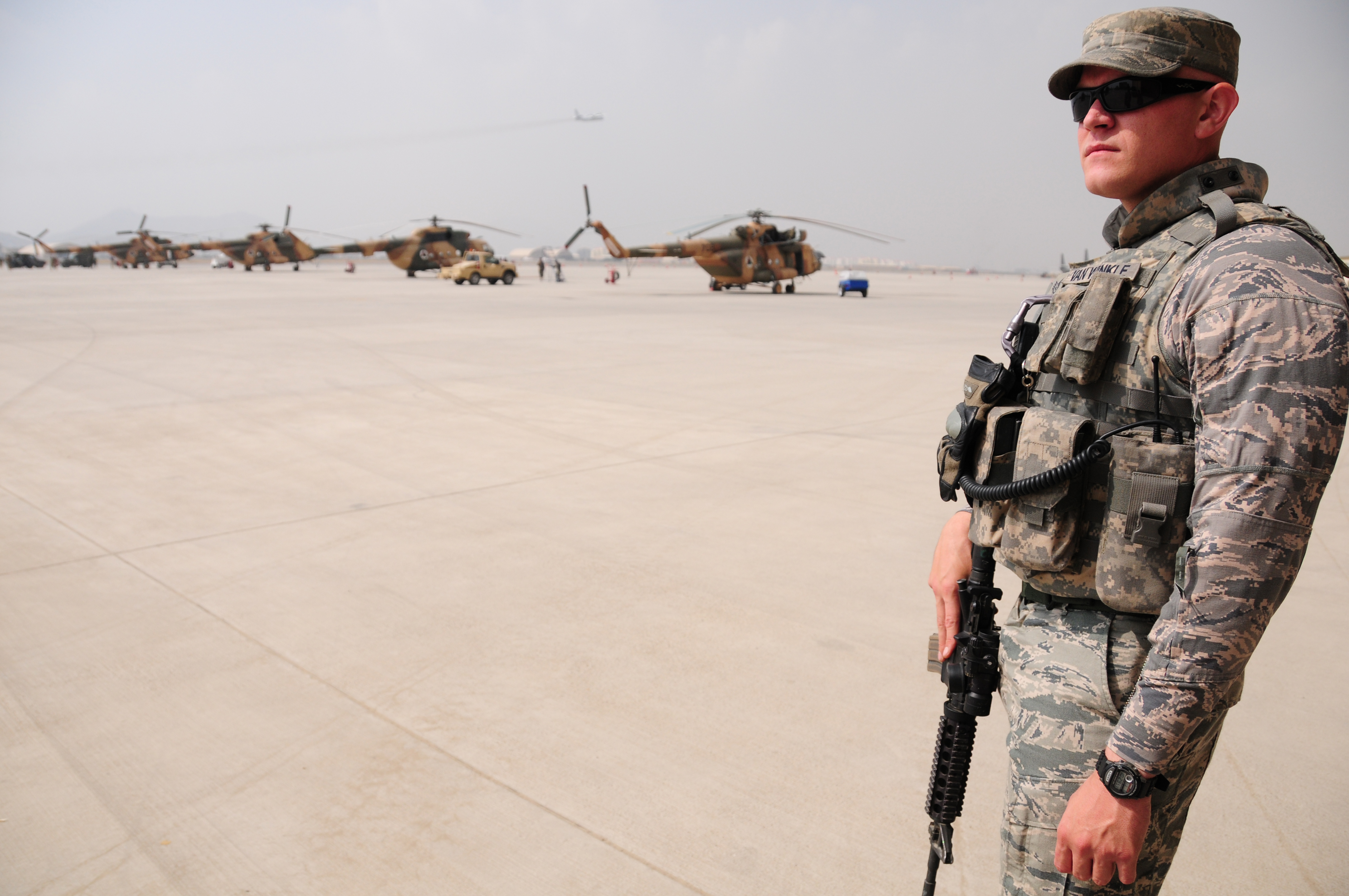
- A deployed airman keeps guard at Kabul Airport
- Active: 1949–1951; 1952–1957; 1965–1994; 2002; 2008—c. 2021
- Country: United States
- Branch: United States Air Force
- Role: Air Expeditionary
- Motto: Nunquam non Paratus (Latin for 'Never Unprepared')
- Engagements: Desert Storm; War in Afghanistan
- Decorations: Air Force Meritorious Unit Award; Air Force Outstanding Unit Award; Republic of Vietnam Gallantry Cross with Palm

Insignia
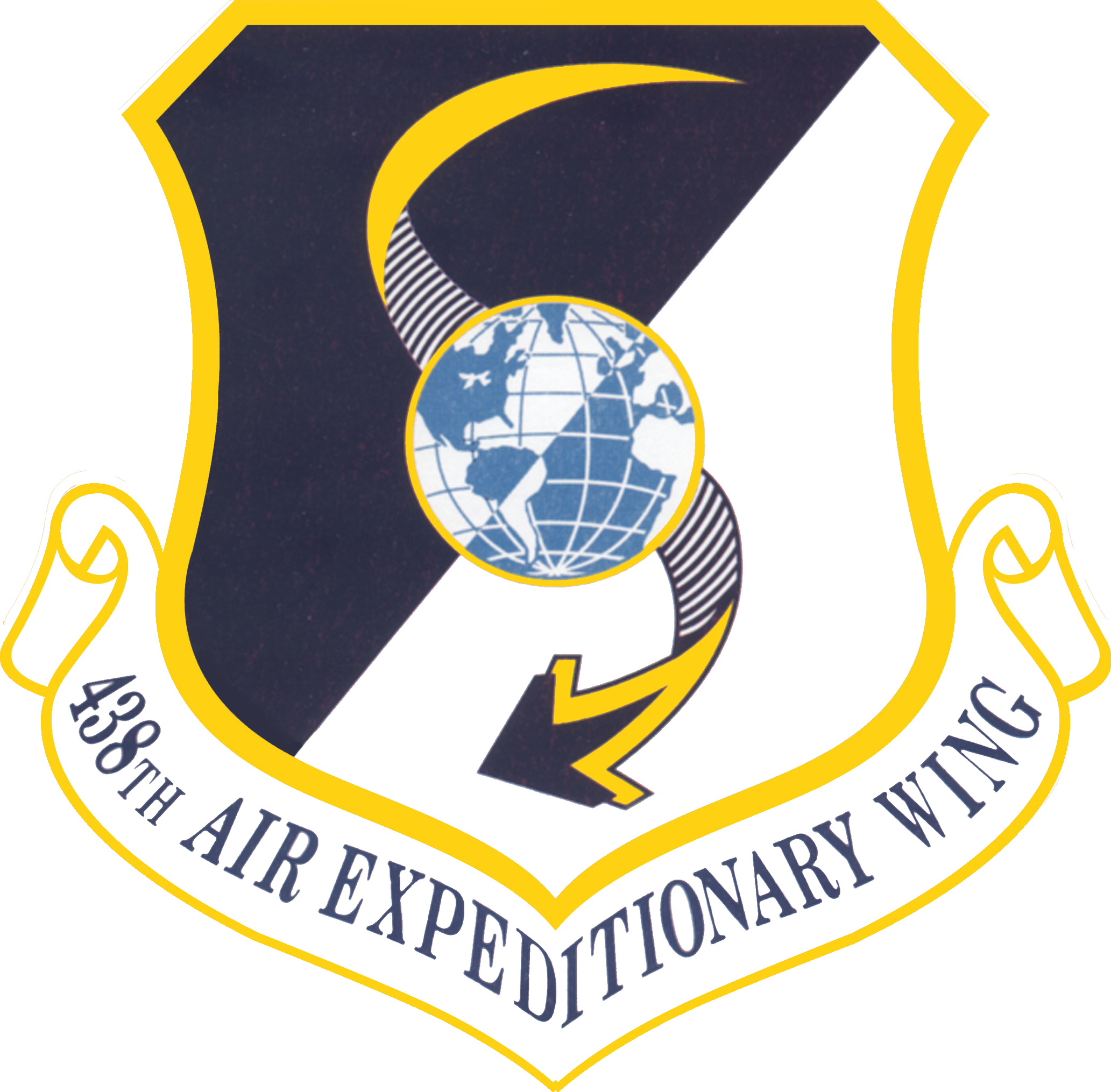
- 438th Air Expeditionary Wing Emblem (Note: Approved 10 August 1954, replaced 16 May 1966, reinstated and slightly modified, 19 July 1993.)

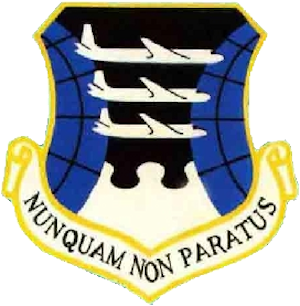
- 438th Military Airlift Wing emblem (Note: Approved 16 May 1966. This emblem was approved with a different motto for the 1611th Air Transport Wing and adopted by the wing when it replaced the 1611th.)

The 438th Air Expeditionary Wing was a United States Air Force unit operating in Afghanistan and assigned to United States Air Forces Central. The wing trained Afghan Air Force members, including pilots. In the Cold War it was active as an airlift wing.

== History ==
For related history, see 438th Air Expeditionary Group

=== Air Force Reserve ===
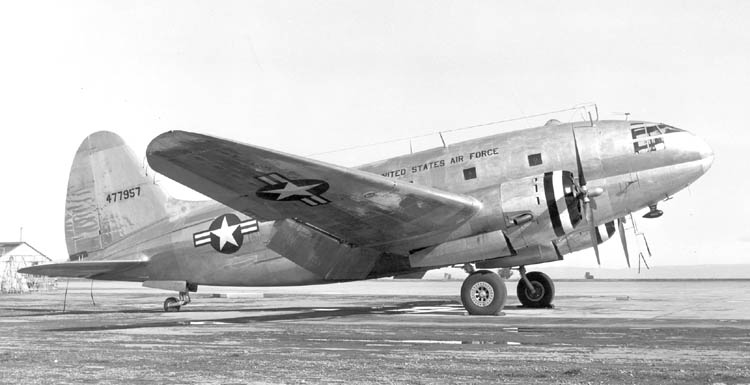
C-46D of the AF Reserve

In 1949 Continental Air Command reorganized its reserve units under the wing base organization, which placed support units under the same headquarters as the combat group they supported. As part of this reorganization, the 438th Troop Carrier Wing was activated at Offutt Air Force Base, Nebraska. The wing absorbed the resources of the 381st Bombardment Group, which was simultaneously inactivated at Offutt. Although the wing's manning, along with that of its component squadrons, was limited to 25% of active duty organization authorizations, it was assigned four squadrons, rather than three. The wing trained under the 2473d Air Force Reserve Training Center for troop carrier operations with the C-46, but also flew the North American T-6 Texan trainer.

All combat units of the Air Force Reserve were ordered to active service for the Korean War. The 438th was called up in the second wave of mobilizations on 10 March 1951. Its personnel were used to man other organizations, primarily those of Strategic Air Command, and it was inactivated on 14 March 1951. Its aircraft were distributed to other organizations as well.

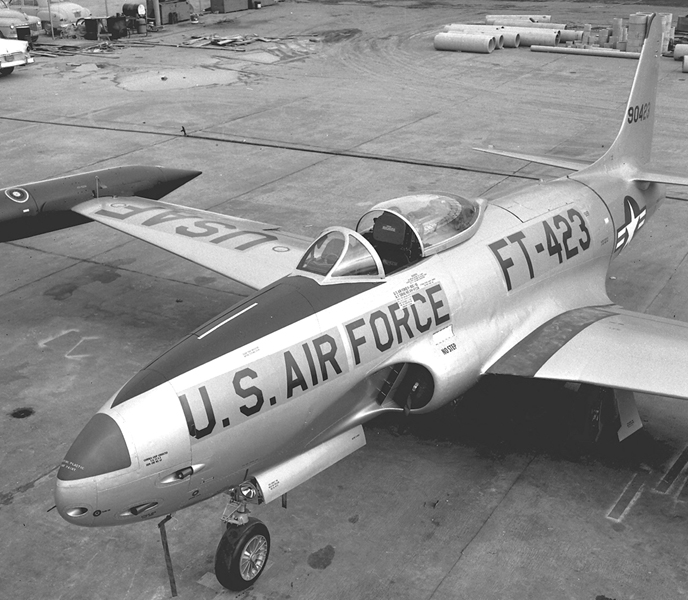
F-80 as flown by the group

Little more than a year later the wing was redesignated the 438th Fighter-Bomber Wing and activated at Billy Mitchell Field, Wisconsin, replacing the 924th Reserve Training Wing there. The reserve mobilization for the Korean War, however, had left the Reserve without airplanes, and the unit did not receive aircraft until July 1952. When it finally began to receive its planes, they were World War II era North American F-51 Mustangs, which would serve until the group's Lockheed F-80 Shooting Stars arrived. Once more, the 2473d Air Force Reserve Training Center was responsible for the training of the 438th Wing and other units at the station. Despite its designation as a fighter bomber unit, the group initially trained in the air defense role.

In 1957 the group began to upgrade to the North American F-86 Sabre. However, its time with this plane would be short. By 1956, the Joint Chiefs of Staff were pressuring the Air Force to provide more wartime airlift. At the same time, about 150 Fairchild C-119 Flying Boxcars became available from the active force. Consequently, in November 1956 the Air Force directed Continental Air Command to convert three fighter bomber wings to the troop carrier mission by September 1957. The wing inactivated one of its squadrons on in July and completed its inactivation on 16 November 1957, when most of its personnel transferred to the 440th Troop Carrier Group, which was simultaneously activated.

=== Strategic Airlift ===
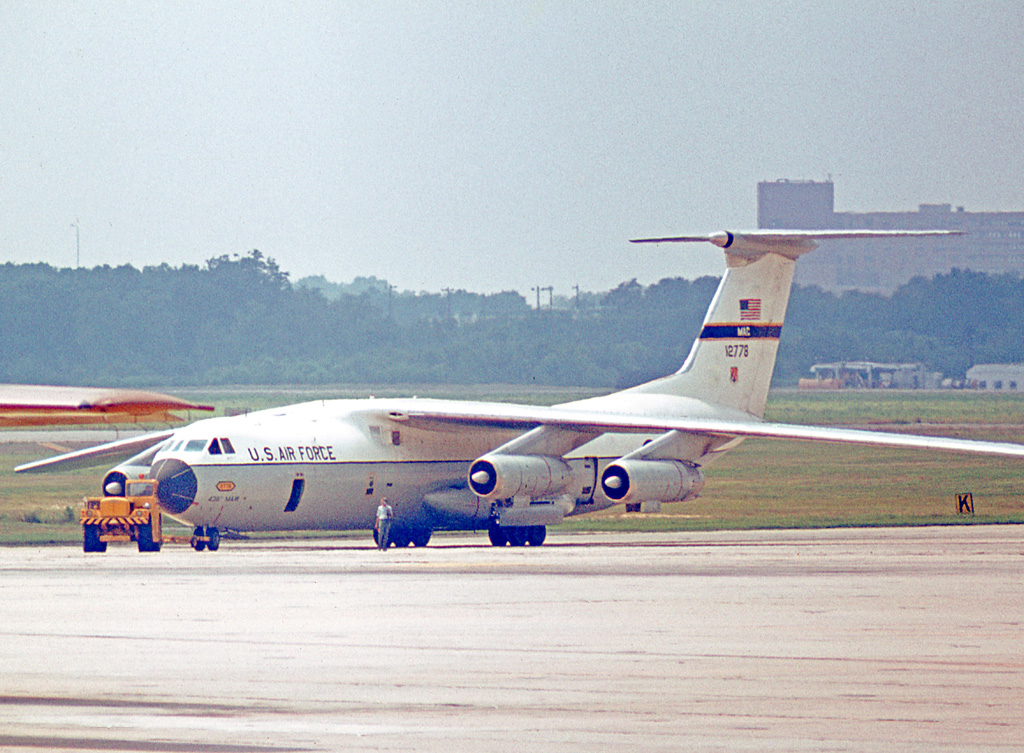
Lockheed C-141A Starlifter of 438 MAW in 1970

The 438th Military Airlift Wing replaced the 1611th Air Transport Wing at McGuire Air Force Base, New Jersey in January 1966, equipped with Lockheed C-141 Starlifters. For the next 30 years, the 438th MAW and transported military cargo, mail and passengers worldwide, particularly in the Eastern United States, Atlantic, European and Mediterranean areas, with frequent special missions to the Arctic, the Antarctic, South America, the Far East, and to Southeast Asia combat areas during the Vietnam War.

On 1 December 1991, the wing was redesignated as the 438th Airlift Wing and implemented objective wing. On 1 June 1992, it was assigned to the new Air Mobility Command.

=== Post Cold War ===
On 1 October 1993, the 30th AS was moved without personnel or equipment (w/o/p/e) to the 374th Operations Group, Yokota AB, Japan, replacing the 20th AS as part of the Air Force illustrious units realignment. It was replaced by the 13th Airlift Squadron at McGuire which was transferred without personnel or equipment from the 18th Operations Group, Kadena AB, Okinawa.

A KC-10 air refueling squadron, the 2d ARS, was assigned to the wing from the former 2d Bomb Wing at Barksdale AFB, Louisiana as part of a major Air Force realignment on 1 October 1994 to have KC-10 bases with two squadrons of 10 aircraft each.

On 1 October 1994, the 438th Airlift Wing was inactivated, being replaced at McGuire by the 305th Air Mobility Wing which was transferred from Grissom AFB, Indiana when Grissom was transferred after a Base Realignment and Closure decision to the Air Force Reserve Command as Grissom ARB.

=== Iraq and Afghanistan ===
The 438th Air Expeditionary Group was activated after the September 11 terror attacks in 2001. Its people fought in Iraq and trained Iraqis and then moved to Afghanistan to train Afghan airmen at bases around the country.

Units in Afghanistan included:

- 438th Air Expeditionary Advisory Group (Kabul International Airport)
  - 438th Air Expeditionary Advisory Squadron (Mi-17 and Mi-35 training)
  - 439th Air Expeditionary Advisory Squadron (mission support advisors)
  - 440th Air Expeditionary Advisory Squadron (maintenance advisors)
  - 538th Air Expeditionary Advisory Squadron, (C-208, C-130)
- 738th Air Expeditionary Advisory Group (Kandahar Airfield)
  - 441st Air Expeditionary Advisory Squadron (Mi-17 training)
  - 442d Air Expeditionary Advisory Squadron (Mi-17 training)

There was formerly a third group active at Shindand Airfield:

- 838th Air Expeditionary Advisory Group
  - 445th Air Expeditionary Advisory Squadron (base communications)
  - 801st Air Expeditionary Advisory Squadron (helicopters)
  - 802d Air Expeditionary Advisory Squadron (training trainers and maintainers)
  - 803th Air Expeditionary Advisory Squadron (fixed-wing, was 444th Air Expeditionary Advisory Squadron)
  - Expeditionary Security Forces Squadron (ESFS)

In 2014 the wing won the Secretary of Defense Award for Excellence in Maintenance Training, Advice, and Assistance of Foreign Security Forces Award in the operational (large) category.

== Lineage ==
- Established as the 438th Troop Carrier Wing, Medium on 10 May 1949

Activated in the reserve on 27 June 1949
Ordered to active service on 10 March 1951
Inactivated on 14 March 1951

- Redesignated 438th Fighter-Bomber Wing on 26 May 1952

Activated in the reserve on 15 June 1952
Inactivated on 16 November 1957

- Redesignated 438th Military Airlift Wing and activated on 27 December 1965 (not organized)

Organized on 8 January 1966
Redesignated 438 Airlift Wing on 1 November 1991
Inactivated on 1 October 1994

- Redesignated 438th Air Expeditionary Wing and converted to provisional status on 4 December 2001
- Activated on 1 February 2002

Inactivated on 26 July 2002

- Activated on 8 November 2008
- United States forces withdrawn from Afghanistan in 2021

=== Assignments ===
- Tenth Air Force, 27 June 1949 – 14 March 1951
- Tenth Air Force, 15 June 1952 – 16 November 1957
- Military Air Transport Service, 27 December 1965 (not organized)
- Military Airlift Command, 1 January 1966 (not organized)
- Twenty-First Air Force, 8 January 1966 – 1 October 1994
- Air Combat Command, to activate or inactivate anytime after 4 December 2001
- 9th Aerospace Expeditionary Task Force-Southern Watch (later 9th Aerospace Expeditionary Task Force), 1 February – 26 July 2002
- 9th Air and Space Expeditionary Task Force, 8 November 2008 – c. 2021

=== Components ===
Wing

- 514th Military Airlift Wing; Attached, 1 July 1973 – 1 October 1994

Groups

- 438th Air Expeditionary Advisory Group
- 438th Troop Carrier Group (later 438th Fighter-Bomber Group, 438th Military Airlift Group, 438th Operations Group): 27 June 1949 – 14 March 1951; 15 June 1952 – 16 November 1957; 15 September 1978 – 1 June 1980; 1 November 1991 – 1 October 1994
- 458th Operations Group: 1 April – 1 October 1994
- 738th Air Expeditionary Advisory Group, 25 November 2009 – 14 September 2019
- 838th Air Expeditionary Advisory Group
- 903d Military Airlift Group: attached 25 September 1968 – 1 July 1973

Squadrons

- 6th Military Airlift Squadron: 8 April 1970 – 1 October 1978; 1 June 1980 – 1 November 1991
- 18th Military Airlift Squadron: 8 January – 15 June 1966 (not operational after 1 February 1966); 1 August 1968 – 1 October 1978; 1 June 1980 – 1 November 1991
- 29th Military Airlift Squadron: 8 January 1966 – 31 August 1968 (not operational after 12 August 1968)
- 30th Military Airlift Squadron: 8 April 1967 – 1 October 1978; 1 June 1980 – 1 November 1991
- 40th Military Airlift Squadron: 8 January 1966 – 4 March 1968 (not operational after 1 December 1967)
- 45th Military Airlift Squadron: 3 July 1967 – 31 August 1968 (not operational after 12 August 1968)
- Military Airlift Squadron Provisional, 1645th: attached 15 March – 3 July 1967
- Naval Air Transport Squadron Three (VR-3): attached 1 February 1966 – 1 July 1967
- 738th Air Expeditionary Advisory Squadron: inactivated on 12 June 2014

=== Stations ===
- Offutt Air Force Base, Nebraska, 27 June 1949 – 14 March 1951
- General Mitchell Field, Wisconsin, 15 June 1952
- Milwaukee, Wisconsin, 5 January 1953 – 16 November 1957
- McGuire Air Force Base, New Jersey, 8 January 1966 – 1 October 1994
- Jacobabad, Pakistan, 1 February – 26 July 2002
- Kabul Airport, Afghanistan, 1 February – 26 July 2002

=== Aircraft ===
- C-46 Commando, 1949–1951; 1953
- F-51 Mustang, 1953–1954
- F-80 Shooting Star, 1954–1957
- F-86 Sabre, 1957
- C-130E Hercules, 1966–1968
- C-135, 1966–1967
- C-141 Starlifter, 1967–1994
