= Shindand Air Base =

Military airbase in Herat, Afghanistan

Shindand Air Base شينډنډ هوايي ډګر
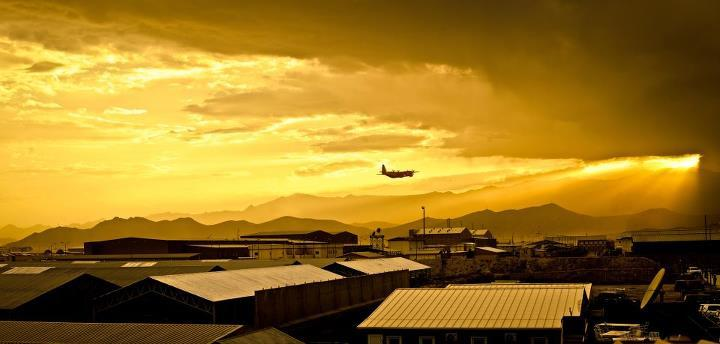
- Breaking dusk, a C-130 takes off from Shindand Air Base in 2012.
- IATA: OAH; ICAO: OASD

Summary
- Airport type: Military
- Owner: Ministry of Defense
- Operator: Afghan Armed Forces
- Serves: Northwestern Afghanistan
- Location: Shindand, Herat, Afghanistan
- Elevation AMSL: 3,780 ft (1,150 m)
- Coordinates: 33°23′32″N 062°15′40″E

Map
- Location of airport in Afghanistan

Runways
Direction	Length		Surface
Direction	ft	m	Surface
18/36	7,933	2,417	Concrete
- Source: AIP Afghanistan

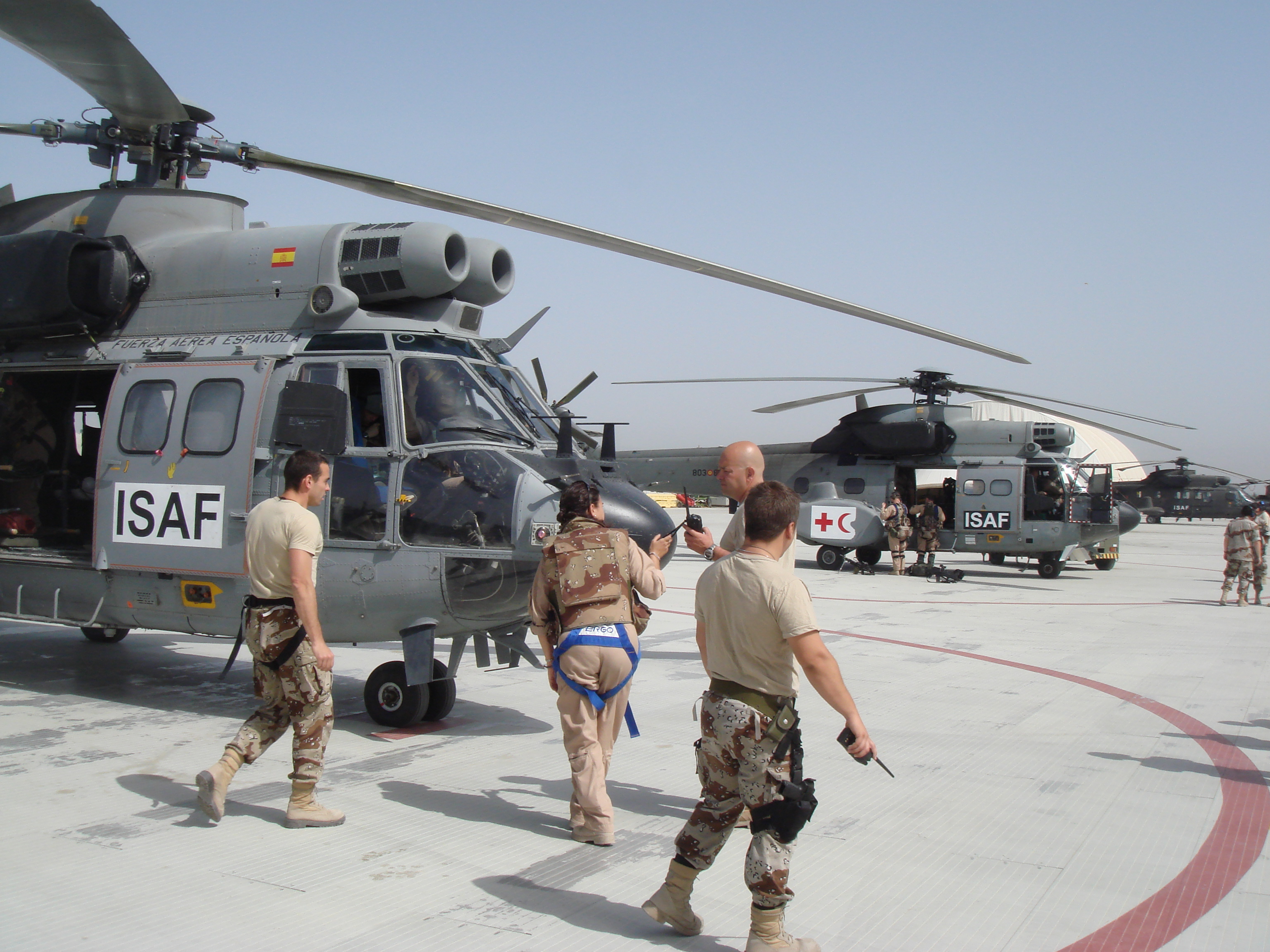

Shindand Air Base (IATA: OAH, ICAO: OASD) is an Afghan air base located in the western part of Afghanistan in the Shindand District of Herat Province, seven miles (11 km) northeast of the city of Shindand. The runway has a concrete surface. An all-weather asphalt road connects it with the Kandahar–Herat Highway, part of Highway 1 (the national ring road). The base is of great strategic importance because it is just 75 miles (121 km) from the border of Iran. It is capable of housing over one hundred military aircraft.

It was one of the largest Afghan Air Force bases.

== History ==
The Soviet Armed Forces began building an airfield near the town of Shindand in 1961 and made heavy use of the base during the Soviet–Afghan War. The Soviet Air Forces’ 129th, 217th, and 274th Fighter-Bomber Regiments were deployed at various times. The Afghan Air Force’s 335th Mixed Air Regiment and 355th Fighter–Bomber Aviation Regiment was additionally stationed at the airfield with 48 Sukhoi Su-7BMs, with the 232nd Air Regiment attaching a squadron of Mil Mi-8 helicopters to the airfield. Control of the base was taken over from President Mohammad Najibullah by Mujahideen forces of the Islamic State of Afghanistan. They were forced to abandon the base in 1997 after the Taliban took over the country, and the runway sustained massive bombing damage during the United States invasion of Afghanistan in 2002. It was then taken by the 3rd Brigade, Central Corps, Afghan National Army, with advisors from the U.S. Army, in August 2004 when the country was under the Karzai administration. Elements of the 3rd Squadron, 4th Cavalry Regiment (3/4 CAV) of the 25th Infantry Division arrived two weeks later to reinforce this force.

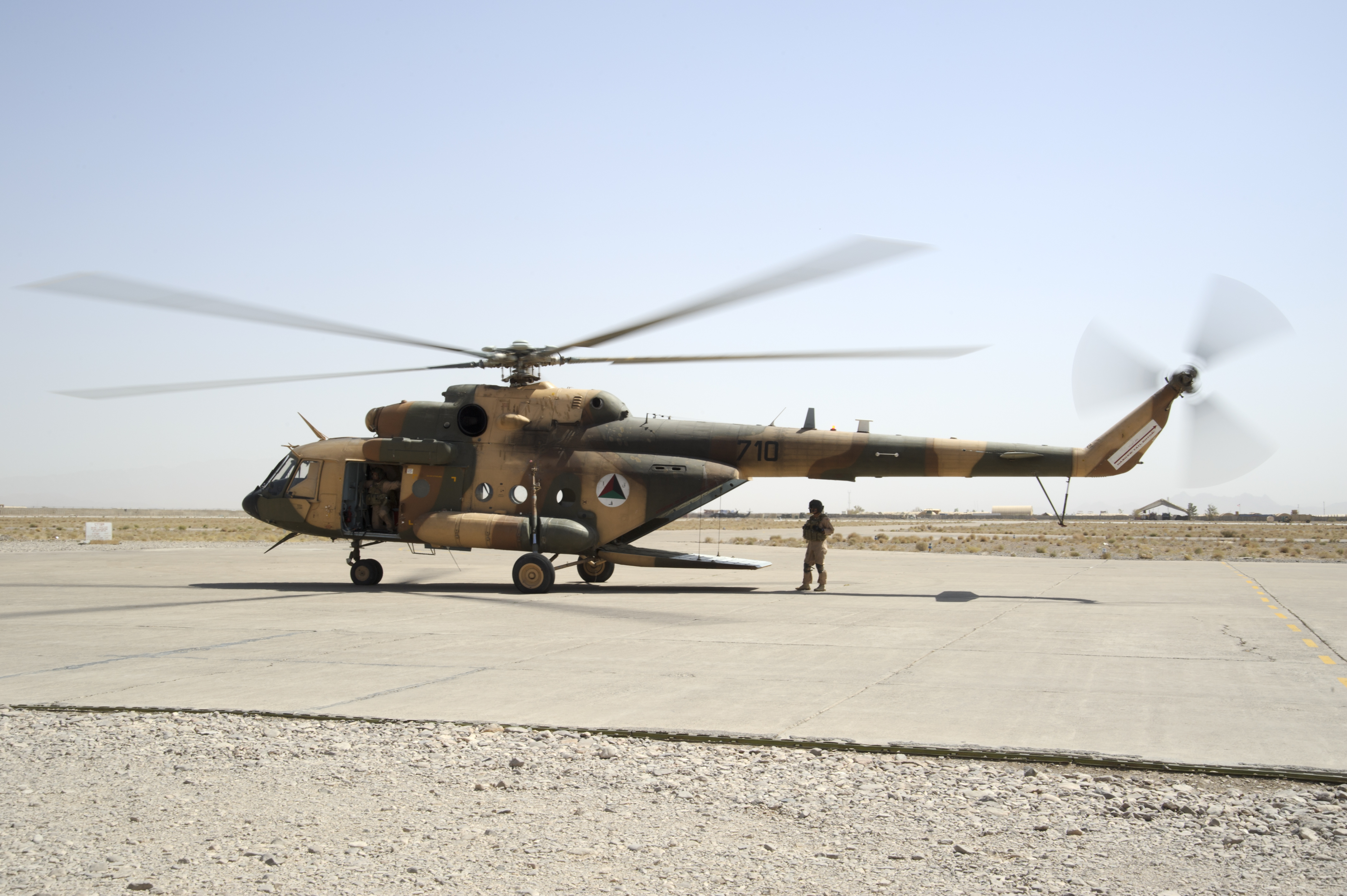
An Afghan Air Force Mi-17 helicopter sits on the ramp at Shindand Air Base in 2011.

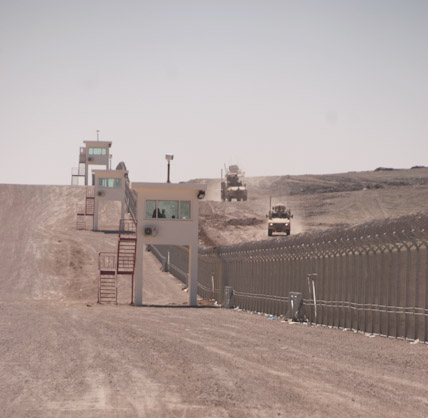
The perimeter fence at Shindand Air Base, which has 52 guard towers and was completed by the USACE

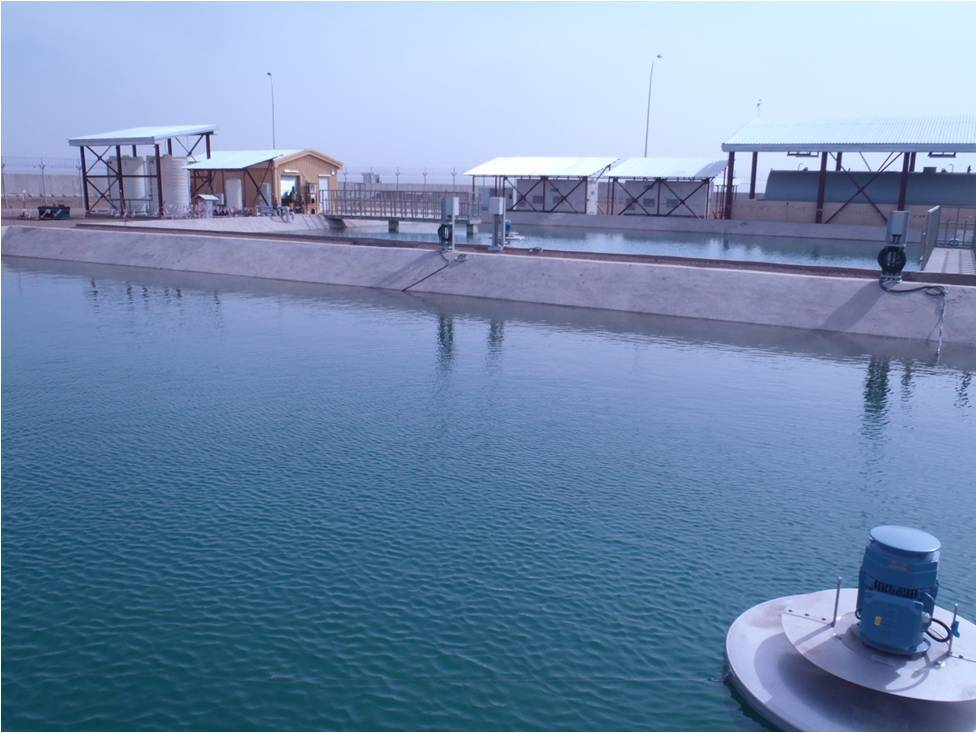
The wastewater treatment plant, also completed by the USACE

In 2010, the runway of the base was refurbished so that it is able to support all military aircraft, including the C-17 Globemaster III. Airmen from the 809th Expeditionary Red Horse Squadron. The Red Horse personnel built two separate sets of parking aprons, aircraft shelters, and maintenance facilities at this location and installed all of the needed utilities. The 5/158 established Helicopter Parking in 2009/2010.

In mid-2011, an expansion of the base was completed which tripled its size. Construction was scheduled to begin on a new 1.3-mile (2.1 km) NATO training runway in early 2012. This was canceled or suspended.

The USACE added an additional 56,000 square meters (600,000 sq ft) of apron and taxiways capable of handling large strategic lift aircraft such as C-17s in 2012. A 1,200-square-meter (13,000 sq ft) cargo terminal, a 790-square-meter (8,500 sq ft) passenger terminal, and a fire suppression system with nearly 600,000 liters (130,000 imp gal; 160,000 U.S. gal) of water were also added to the air base.

Supplying U.S. Army soldiers in Regional Command West, in March 2011, the 529th Combat Sustainment Support Battalion was replaced by the 298th Combat Sustainment Support Battalion. In January 2012, the 298th Combat Sustainment Support Battalion was replaced by the 365th Combat Sustainment Support Battalion (Mississippi Army Reserve).

Prior to summer 2011 base security was run by US host units 5/158 (12th CAB) as well as hired Afghan contractors. An Air Force Security Forces ESFS was not officially stood up, but nevertheless manned by a HQ unit of the 820th BDG and airmen sourced from several bases around summer 2011. In December 2011, members of Bravo Battery, 1/134 Field Artillery, were sourced to take the base defense mission mixed with a reduced contingent of Air Force Security Forces to create Task Force Griffin. Consisting of 240 Army and Air Force personnel and 350 Afghan security contractors conducting base defense operations in western Afghanistan. A small team of 15 soldiers from Bravo Battery conducted the first ever American/Italian joint operation in the RC West. The same 15-person team was the first established tactical security detail for OSI's Expeditionary Detachment 2416, Taskforce Grey (Ghost). The lead OSI Special Agent for this team would go on to be awarded the Bronze Star.

During the late 2000s through the end of 2014, the Mongolian national army played a role in base security through the use of U.S. MRAPs, fortified guard posts and foot patrols. The Mongolian army worked closely alongside ISAF and NATO forces during their occupation of the base.

In the fall of 2011, Bravo Battery from the 1st Battalion, 134th Field Artillery Regiment, 37th IBCT, deployed to Shindand as Task Force Griffin (Task Force Roc). They provided base security, carried out patrol and assessment missions, checkpoint control and flight line security for the base. A squad consisting of 14 personnel from the Task Force, known as Rogue Squad, provided the tactical security element for the USAF Office of Special Investigations Expeditionary Detachment 2416, Task Force Grey, during outside-the-wire counter-terrorism and counter-intelligence operations.

On 27 February 2012, advisers renamed the 'base-in-a-box' portion of the base to Camp Estelle, in dedication to Air Force Major Raymond Estelle II, who lost his life 27 April 2011, during a shooting incident at the Afghan Command and Control Center in the Afghanistan air force headquarters at the Kabul International Airport.

In the summer of 2012, the 3rd Battalion, C & D Company 144th Infantry regiment from the 56th BCT, 36 Infantry Division deployed to Afghanistan (RC West) as Task Force Bowie. TF Bowie provided Battalion Command Base Security, including but not limited to presences/combat patrols, assessment missions, checkpoint control and flight line security for Shindand Airbase and surrounding areas.

In 2013, the 1st Battalion, 214th Field Artillery Regiment, deployed to Shindand as Task Force Granite. Task Force Granite was responsible for base security. They provided Base Security Battalion Command, and carried out patrol and assessment missions, checkpoint control and flight line security for the base. The 1/214's B Battery also provided the tactical security element for the USAF Office of Special Investigation's Expeditionary Detachment 2416, Task Force Grey during outside-the-wire counterthreat operations.

Between 2012 and 2014 Shindand air base was used for U.S. led undergraduate pilot training of the Afghan Air Force.

The U.S. military Crash, Fire, and Rescue which had officially started up in 2009, closed in November 2014, switching to contractors. Shindand was home to the 3rd Wing of the Afghan Air Force until August 2021.

For several years, the U.S. Air Force's 838th Air Expeditionary Advisory Group operated at the base supporting the NATO Training Mission-Afghanistan. The base may also have been used in the past by the Central Intelligence Agency (CIA) for surveillance missions over western Afghanistan that included use of the RQ-170 drone.

"Construction of a perimeter fence at Shindand Air Base tripled the size of the base and included 52 guard towers. Force protection was a major component of the U.S. Army Corps of Engineers (USACE) military construction program in Afghanistan." Shindand also hosted the 3rd Wing of the Afghan Air Force (AAF) until August 2021.

In August 2021, Shindand Air Base fell to the Taliban after a surrender by government forces. The Taliban captured weaponry and vehicles from the Afghan National Army and Afghan Air Force.

On 6 December the Taliban Government reformed the Afghan Air Force.

== See also ==
- List of airports in Afghanistan
