= Resolute Support Mission =

2015–2021 NATO-led assistance mission in Afghanistan

- Official logo of RSM
- Active: 1 January 2015–September 2021
- Country: Contributing states: see below
- Allegiance: NATO
- Size: Peak Strength: 17,178 (October 2019)
- Part of: Allied Joint Force Command Brunssum American contingent responsible to: United States Central Command; MacDill AFB, Florida, U.S.
- Headquarters: Kabul, Afghanistan
- Mottos: تعلیمات، کمک، مشورت (training, assistance, advice)
- Engagements: War in Afghanistan

Commanders
- Last Commander: Kenneth F. McKenzie Jr.
- Notable commanders: Austin S. Miller; John W. Nicholson Jr. John F. Campbell

Insignia
- Flag

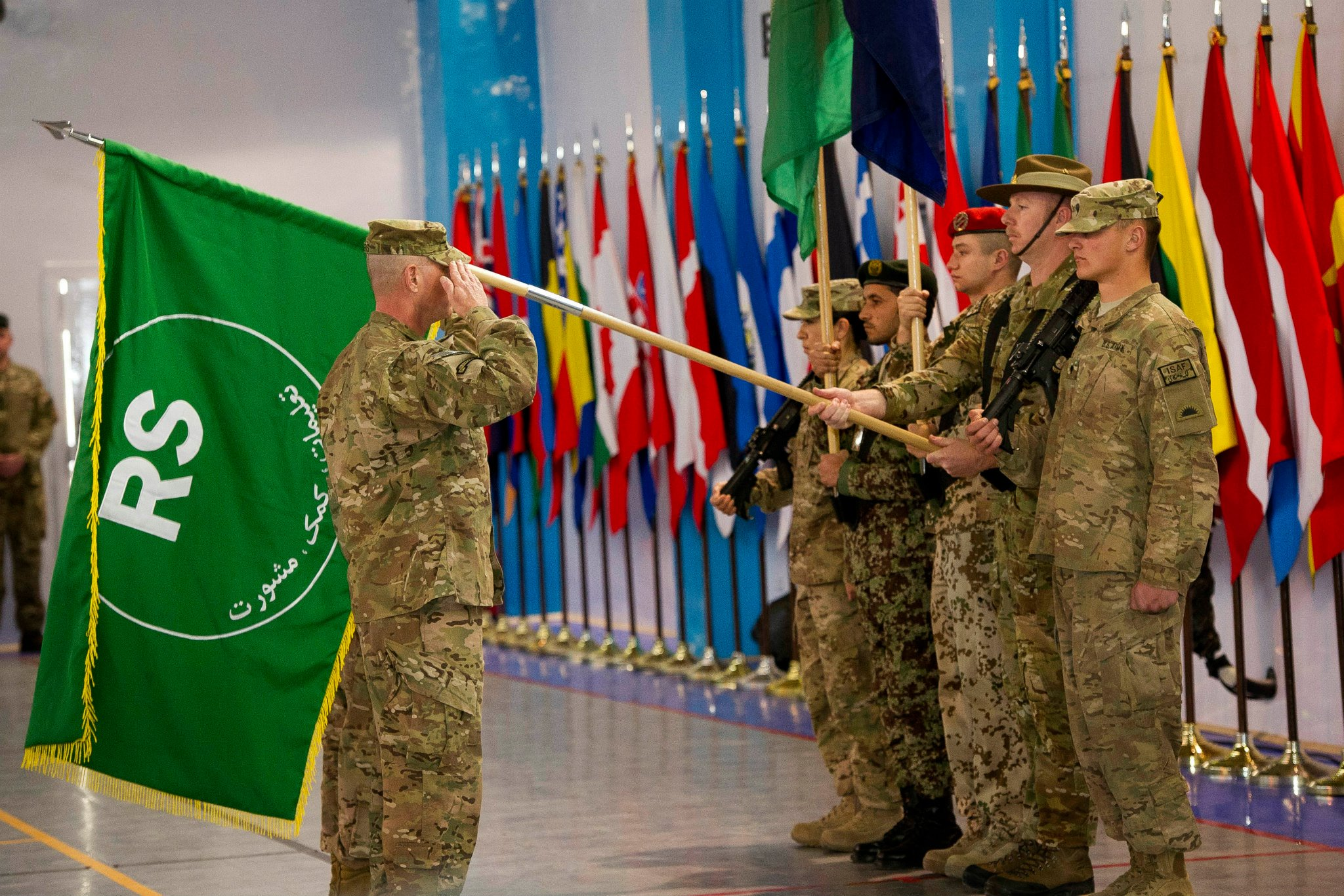
Change of Mission Ceremony from ISAF to Resolute Support, 28 December 2014, Kabul

Badge used to identify personnel part of Resolute Support Mission

Resolute Support Mission (RSM) or Operation Resolute Support was a NATO-led multinational mission in Afghanistan. It began on 1 January 2015 as the successor to the International Security Assistance Force (ISAF), which was completed on 28 December 2014. Pursuant to United Nations Security Council Resolution 2189 of 2014, RSM was a noncombat mission aimed at advising and training Afghan security forces to provide long-term security to the country, under the aegis of the U.S.–Afghanistan Strategic Partnership Agreement between the United States and Afghanistan, which was originally supposed to run from 1 January 2015 and was to "remain in force until the end of 2024 and beyond" unless terminated with two years' advance notice.

The number of troops and contributing nations diminished throughout the mission. In October 2019, RSM had its largest size of troops, which was 17,178. Moreover, throughout 2015, the RSM had its peak of contributing nations, which was 42. The US accounted for the largest contingent, while Italy, Germany, and Turkey served leading roles. Intended to play a temporary and transitionary role, the mission gradually withdrew its forces, which numbered around 10,000 at the start of 2021. On 14 April 2021 via a North Atlantic Council Ministerial Statement, NATO announced a drawdown of RSM troops by 1 May, and the mission was terminated early September 2021. The last remaining RSM troops to leave was the 82nd Airborne Division commanded by Major General Christopher T. Donahue, which were withdrawn on August 30, 2021.

== Legal basis ==
The operation plan for the Resolute Support Mission (RSM) was approved by foreign ministers of the NATO members in late June 2014 and the corresponding status of forces agreement was signed by President of Afghanistan Ashraf Ghani and NATO Senior Civilian Representative in Afghanistan Maurits Jochems in Kabul on 30 September 2014. The United Nations Security Council unanimously adopted United Nations Security Council Resolution 2189 in support of the new international mission in Afghanistan.

== Objectives and deployment ==
The objective of the mission was to provide training, advice and assistance for Afghan security forces and institutions in their conflict with extremist groups such as the Taliban, the Haqqani network, and ISIS-K.

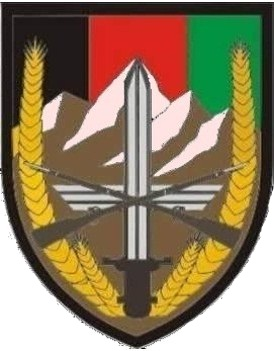
USFOR-A SSI

The Resolute Support Mission consisted of approximately 17,000 personnel from NATO and partner nations in Afghanistan. The leader of the operation was at all times identical with the commander of United States Forces - Afghanistan.

Forces were distributed between the central hub at Kabul and Bagram Airfield and four supporting spokes. The spokes were formed by Train Advise Assist Commands (TAACs), which directly supported four of the six Afghan National Army Corps. Train Advise Assist Command - Capital replaced the former Regional Command Capital. TAAC East assisted the 201st Corps from FOB Gamberi in Laghman, TAAC South assists the 205th Corps from Kandahar International Airport, TAAC West assisted the 207th Corps in Herat and TAAC North covered the 209th Corps from Mazar-i-Sharif.

The 203rd Corps located in the south-eastern part of the country saw advisers from time to time from TAAC East (one source described this as "fly to advise"). The 215th Corps in the south-west is supported by TAAC South.

U.S. President Barack Obama, in an update given from the White House on 6 July 2016, stated that, following General John W. Nicholson's, Joint Chiefs of Staff Chairman General Joseph Dunford's, and U.S. Defense Department Secretary Ashton Carter's mutual recommendations, the U.S. would have about 8,400 troops remaining in Afghanistan through the end of his administration in December 2016.

The residual force of 9,800 troops was withdrawn on 31 December 2016, leaving 8,400 troops stationed at four garrisons (Kabul, Kandahar, Bagram, and Jalalabad).

The Special Inspector General for Afghanistan Reconstruction (SIGAR) was appointed by the US Congress to oversee the $117.26 billion that Congress had provided to implement reconstruction programs in Afghanistan. The SIGAR's "April 30, 2018 Quarterly Report to Congress" says, "[As of January 31, 2018,] 14.5% of the country's total districts [were] under insurgent control or influence [& an additional 29.2% were] contested[.]"

== Collapse and dissection ==
Intended to play a temporary and transitionary role, the mission gradually withdrew its forces, which numbered around 10,000 at the start of 2021. On 14 April 2021 via a North Atlantic Council Ministerial Statement, NATO announced a drawdown of RSM troops by 1 May, and the mission was terminated early September 2021.

The US Forces Afghanistan Forward was the name given by US Secretary of Defense Lloyd Austin, and it continued to have a military presence in the country until all US forces were withdrawn by August 30, 2021.

In November 2021 NATO published a factsheet on its 'Afghanistan Lessons Learned Process'. Seven meetings of a committee of NATO civil servants were held and the result was termed a "comprehensive review". John Manza, the committee's chair and the contemporary Assistant Secretary General for Operations, presented a summary that was reviewed and discussed by the NAC Permanent Representatives and the NAC Foreign Ministers. NATO HQ felt it "should consider mechanisms to improve the timeliness and relevance of reporting from the field and for more interactive discussions in the Council."

SIGAR reported to Congress with the title "Collapse of the Afghan National Defense and Security Forces: An Assessment of the Factors That Led to Its Demise" in May 2022.

General David Petraeus, who had commanded for a time around 2010 the precursor ISAF mission to Afghanistan, described the end of the mission as "heart-breaking, tragic and disastrous" as he said "Afghanistan's gone back to the dark ages" in an interview on the release of the UK Parliament's Foreign Affairs Committee report on the matter. The report said the fact that the then-Foreign Secretary Dominic Raab, his Permanent Secretary Philip Barton and Prime Minister Boris Johnson were all on summertime leave when the Taliban took Afghanistan's capital, Kabul, "marks a fundamental lack of seriousness, grip or leadership at a time of [British] national emergency", especially in light of the vacuum left by the flight of President Ashraf Ghani, his cabinet and vaporous government of the Islamic Republic of Afghanistan.

As of June 2022 the Afghanistan War Commission had yet to report.

== Contributing nations ==
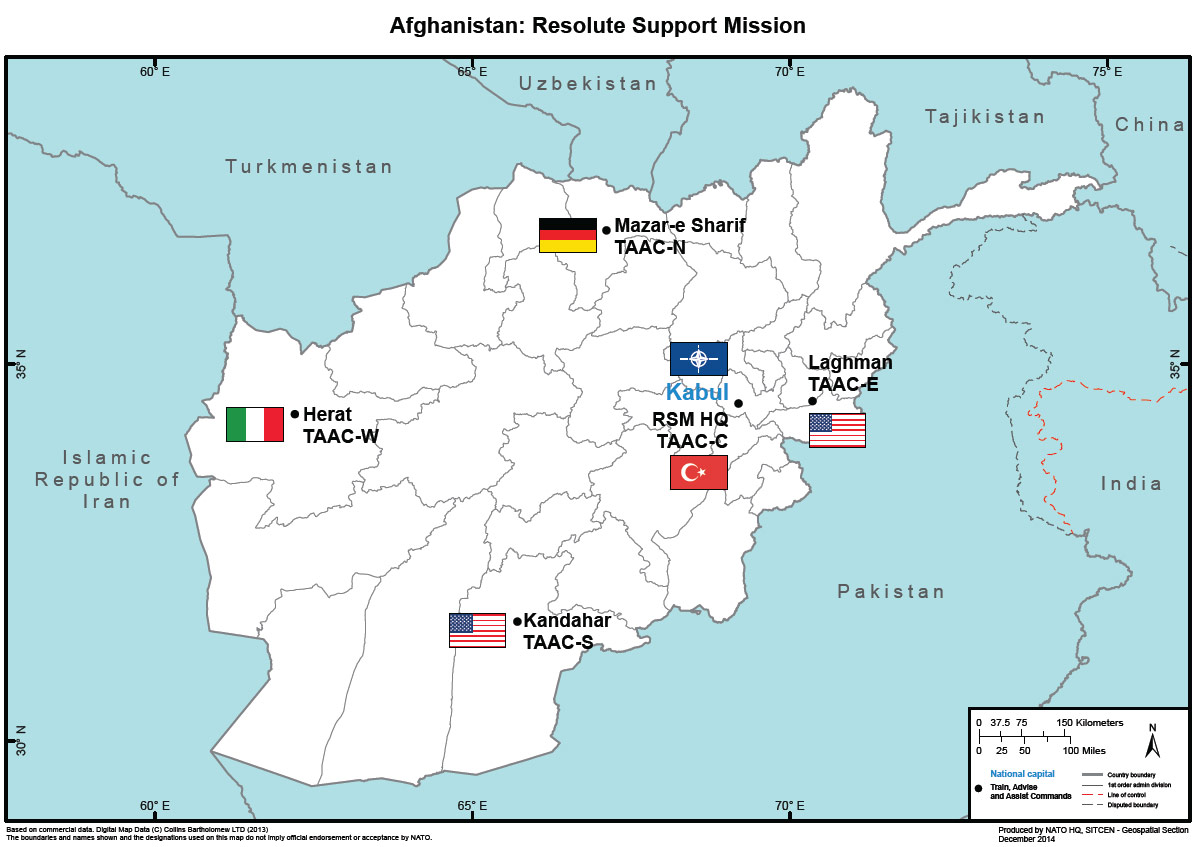
Map of Resolute Support Mission that documents the partition of responsibilities between allies: TAAC – Capital, TAAC – North, TAAC – South, TAAC – East, TAAC – West

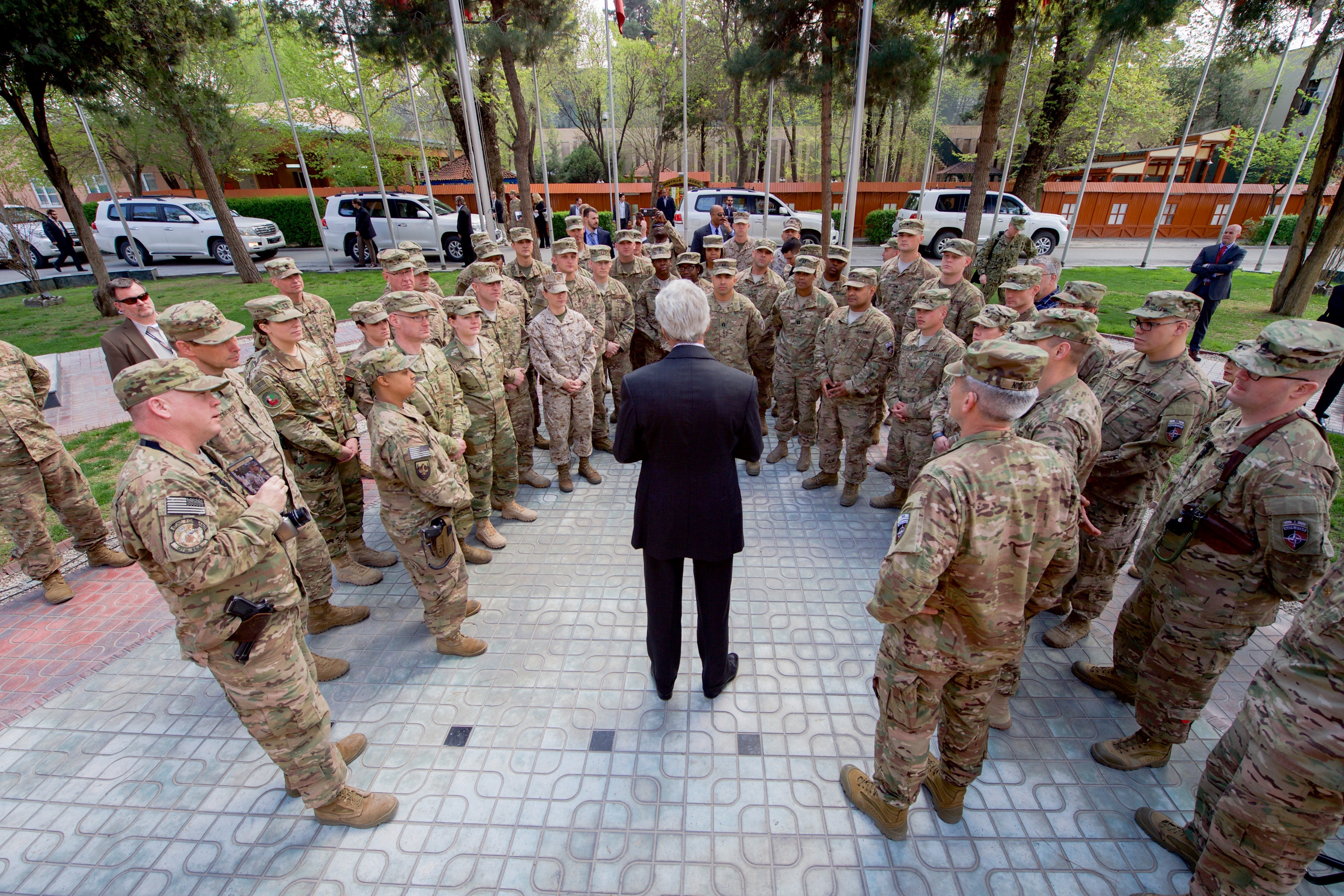
U.S. Secretary of State John Kerry speaks to soldiers at Resolute Support headquarters in Kabul, 9 April 2016

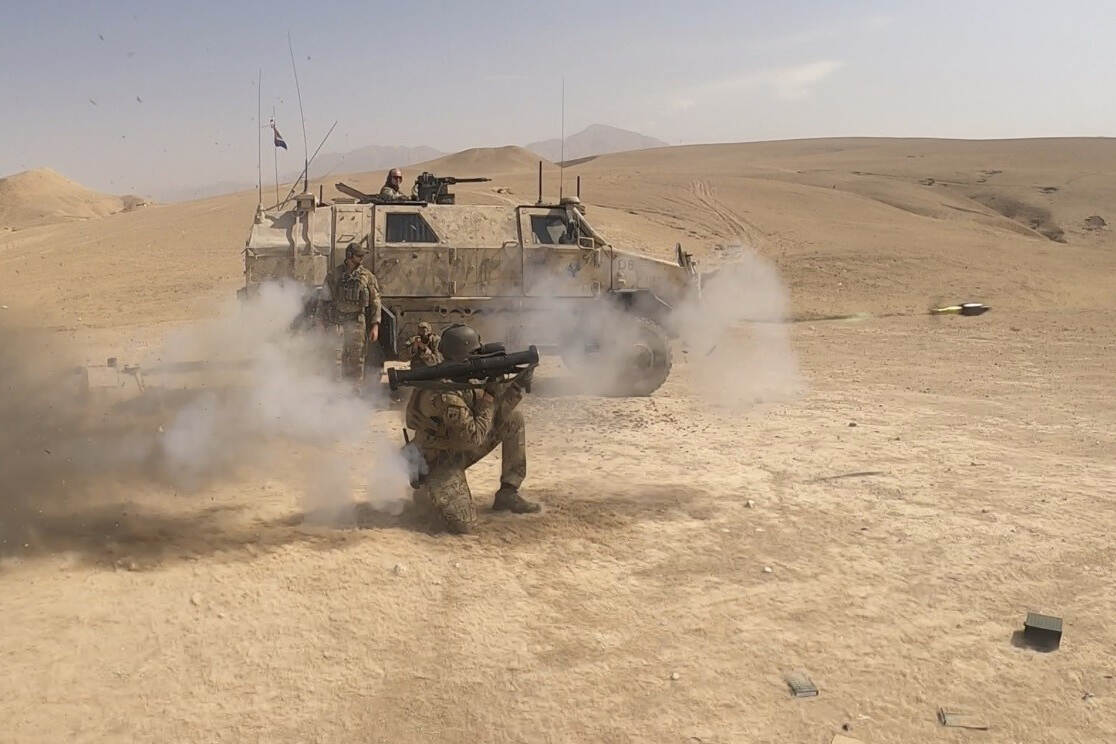
A Dutch soldier fires a Panzerfaust 3 in Afghanistan, 30 September 2020. Over 100 Netherlands Armed Forces personnel participated in the Resolute Support Mission.

In 2019, the forces that contributed to the mission were 8,475 Americans that trained and helped Afghan forces, approximately 5,500 Americans engaged in counter-terrorism missions, 8,673 allied soldiers and 27,000 military contractors.

A new type of U.S. unit, the Security Force Assistance Brigades, deployed to Afghanistan in February 2018 to support the mission.

The United Kingdom announced in July 2018 that it sent 440 more British personnel to Afghanistan. Around half of the additional personnel were deployed in August 2018 and the other half followed by February 2019. This increased the total number of British personnel in the country from 650 to 1,090 by early 2019.

The countries that had personnel in Afghanistan as of February 2021 (with complete statistics last published prior to withdrawal) are as follows. The mission was terminated on 12 July 2021, and several countries had personnel in place, before all were withdrawn before 31 August 2021.

Country	Number of personnel (September 2021)	Number of personnel (February 2021)	Date withdrawn
Albania		99	21 June 2021
Armenia		121	4 March 2021
Australia		80	1 July 2021
Austria		16	18 June 2021
Azerbaijan		120	26 August 2021
Belgium		72	14 June 2021
Bosnia-Herzegovina		66	23 June 2021
Bulgaria		117	24 June 2021
Croatia		107 (in February 2020)	13 September 2020
Czech Republic		52	27 June 2021
Denmark		135	22 June 2021
Estonia		45	23 June 2021
Finland		20	8 June 2021
France		266	28 August 2021
Georgia		860	28 June 2021
Germany		1,300	29 June 2021
Greece		11	4 July 2021
Hungary		8	8 June 2021
Iceland		3 (in June 2019)	Specific date unknown, but withdrawn by October 2019
Ireland		7 (in March 2016)	6 March 2016
Italy		895	29 June 2021
Latvia		2	3 July 2021
Lithuania		40	Late June 2021
Luxembourg		2	19 May 2021
Mongolia		233	07 June 2021
Montenegro		32	2021
Netherlands		160	24 June 2021
New Zealand		6	29 March 2021
North Macedonia		17	29 June 2021
Norway		101	26 June 2021
Poland		290	30 June 2021
Portugal		174	23 May 2021
Romania		619	26 June 2021
Slovakia		25	16 June 2021
Slovenia		6	20 May 2021
Spain		24	13 May 2021
Sweden		16	25 May 2021
Turkey		600	27 August 2021
Ukraine		21	5 June 2021
United Kingdom		750	28 August 2021
United States		3,500	30 August 2021
Total	0	10,624	

== List of commanders ==
The Commander of Resolute Support reported to NATO through the Commander of Joint Forces Command – Brunssum, who reported to the NATO Supreme Allied Commander Europe (SACEUR).

The USFOR-A Commander reports to the Commander, United States Central Command (CENTCOM), who reports directly to the Secretary of Defense. This reporting relationship is prescribed in 10 USC Section 164(d)(1). The Resolute Support Mission Commander (COMRS) does not have a direct reporting relationship with the Secretary of Defense.

No.	Commander		Term		
No.	Portrait	Name	Took office	Left office	Duration
1	John F. Campbell	General; John F. Campbell (born 1957)	December 28, 2014	March 2, 2016	1 year, 65 days
2	John W. Nicholson Jr.	General; John W. Nicholson Jr. (born 1957)	March 2, 2016	September 2, 2018	2 years, 184 days
3	Austin S. Miller	General; Austin S. Miller (born 1961)	September 2, 2018	July 12, 2021	2 years, 313 days
4	Kenneth F. McKenzie Jr.	General; Kenneth F. McKenzie Jr. (born 1956 or 1957)	July 12, 2021	August 31, 2021	50 days

== See also ==
- Operation Freedom's Sentinel – American mission in Afghanistan (2015–2021)
- Operation Allies Refuge – part of the evacuation from Afghanistan (summer 2021)
