= Train Advise Assist Command – Capital =

Train Advise Assist Command – Capital (TAAC – Capital)
- Role: Training
- Garrison/HQ: Camp KAIA
- Website: TAAC - Capital

Train Advise Assist Command – Capital (TAAC – Capital) was a multinational military formation, part of NATO's Resolute Support Mission within Afghanistan. The headquarters was in Kabul. Prior to 2014 it was designated Regional Command Capital of the International Security Assistance Force (ISAF). Regional Command Capital was in turn a redesignation of the former Kabul Multinational Brigade, the change taking place on 6 August 2006. The KMNB usually had about three battlegroups, each responsible for a sector of Kabul.

== History ==
As part of ISAF the command of this region rotated among Turkey, France and Italy. French Brigadier General Michel Stollsteiner served as the commander from August 2008 to July 2009. From about November 2009 Turkey was the leading nation in this region. On 31 October 2009 the Turkish Brigadier General Levent ÇOLAK took over command from France Brigadier General. Strength in 2010 appx. 6,150. Nearly all of the more than forty contributors had troops deployed to Kabul. The ISAF presence at Kabul International Airport (KAIA) (provided by Hungary, previously Belgium) was also part of RC-Capital.

16 Air Assault Brigade of the British Army initially provided the Kabul Multinational Brigade. Then-Brigadier Barney White-Spunner of the British Army commanded the KMNB in 2002. In March 2002 the KMNB was transferred to German Army control. From 27 July 2004 until 27 January 2005, the Franco-German Brigade led by Brigadegeneral Walter Spindler, was at the head of the Kabul Multinational Brigade (KMNB). From July to December 2005 the KMNB was commanded by German Brigadegeneral Hans-Christoph Ammon, who was serving as commander of Germany's 30th Panzergrenadier Brigade. Between 6 February and 6 August 2006, SEEBRIG HQ was deployed as Kabul Multinational Brigade HQ, under ISAF Command. The Turkish Army's 28th Mechanized Infantry Brigade served as Kabul Multinational Brigade for a period, and during the same period, the Turkish Armed Forces ran the Kabul International Airport.

The French forces in Afghanistan used to have a battle group under RC Capital's command, but it was later shifted to Regional Command East.
