= 438th Air Expeditionary Advisory Group =

- The commander of the 438th Air Expeditionary Advisory Group, gives a certificate to an Afghan National Army Air Force airman during a graduation ceremony
- Active: 2008–2021
- Country: United States
- Branch: United States Air Force
- Role: Training

Insignia
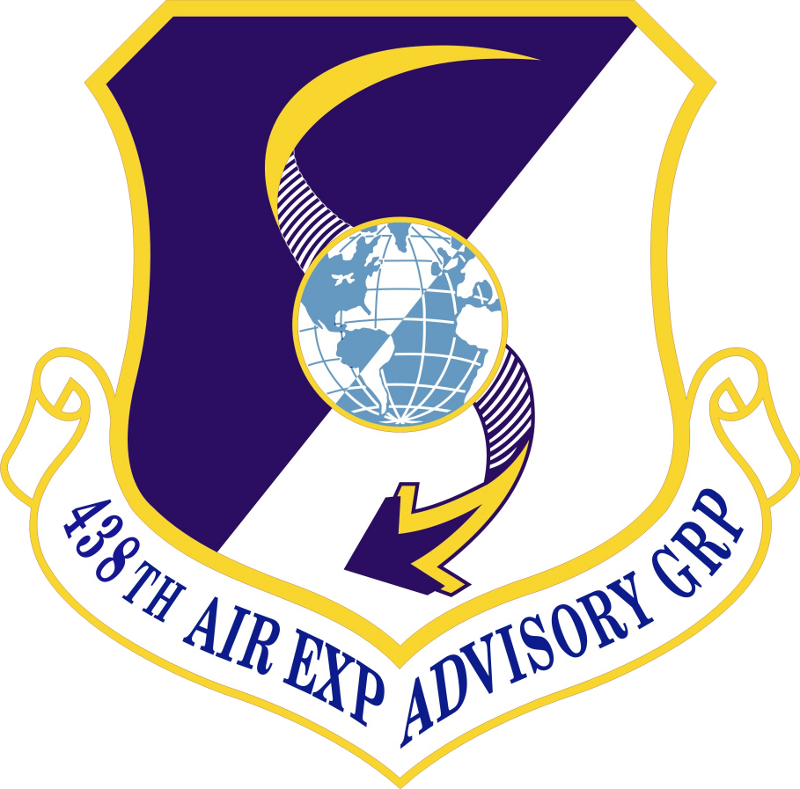
- 438th Air Expeditionary Advisory Group emblem

The United States Air Force's 438th Air Expeditionary Advisory Group was USAF training group that was assigned to the 438th Air Expeditionary Wing of USAFCENT and was stationed at Kabul Airport, Afghanistan. It fought in the War in Afghanistan (2001-2021).

The 438th Air Expeditionary Group stood up on in November 2008 at Kabul Airport, Afghanistan to train fixed and rotary wing aircrew and maintenance.

== Lineage ==
- Constituted as the 438th Air Expeditionary Advisory Group on 23 October 2008

Activated on 1 November 2008
Inactivated c. 2021

=== Assignments ===
- Air Combat Commnns to activate or inactivate as needed, 23 October 2008
- 438th Air Expeditionary Wing, 2008–2021

=== Components ===
- 438th Air Expeditionary Advisory Squadron - renamed 311th Air Expeditionary Advisory Squadron, February 2016, to follow in the traditions of No. 311 (Czech) Squadron RAF under Czech Air Force command. The 311 Squadron was disbanded in February 2019.
- 439th Air Expeditionary Advisor Squadron
- 440th Air Expeditionary Advisor Squadron
- 538th Air Expeditionary Advisor Squadron
- Detachment 1 (Jalalabad)
- Detachment 3 (Mazar-e-Shariff)

=== Stations ===
Kabul Airport, Afghanistan, 1 November 2008 – 2021

=== Aircraft ===
- Mil Mi-17 Hip
- Mil Mi-35 Hind
- C-27A
- C-208
- A-29
- MD-530
- UH-60
