= United Nations Security Council Resolution 1974 =

UN Security Council Resolution 1974
- Afghanistan
- Date: 22 March 2011
- Meeting no.: 6,500
- Code: S/RES/1974 (Document)
- Subject: The situation in Afghanistan
- Voting summary: 15 voted for; None voted against; None abstained
- Result: Adopted

Security Council composition
- Permanent members: China; France; Russia; United Kingdom; United States
- Non-permanent members: Bosnia–Herzegovina; Brazil; Colombia; Germany; Gabon; India; Lebanon; Nigeria; Portugal; South Africa

United Nations Security Council Resolution 1974, adopted unanimously on March 22, 2011, after recalling previous resolutions on Afghanistan, in particular 1917 (2010), the Council extended the mandate of the United Nations Assistance Mission in Afghanistan (UNAMA) for a period of one year until March 23, 2012.

The adoption of the resolution came as Afghan President Hamid Karzai announced that seven locations in Afghanistan would be transferred from coalition to Afghan control.

== Observations ==
The Council recognised that there was no purely military solution to the situation in Afghanistan and reiterated its support to the Afghan people in rebuilding their country. Support was given to the Kabul International Conference held on July 22, 2010. It was stressed that the central role of the United Nations in Afghanistan was promoting peace and stability by leading the efforts of the international community. The Council also welcomed the continued commitment of the international community to support the stability and development of the country, particularly those that were increasing civilian and humanitarian efforts to assist the Government of Afghanistan and its people.

The resolution welcomed an agreement between the International Security Assistance Force (ISAF) and the Afghan government to transfer lead security responsibilities to the Afghan security forces by the end of 2014. The Council also recognised the interconnected nature of the challenges in Afghanistan with regards to progress on security, governance, human rights, the rule of law and development, as well as the issues of anti‑corruption, counter-narcotics and transparency. The need for greater co-operation between United Nations and international agencies was noted.

Also important to the Council was the humanitarian situation in the country and the delivery and co-ordination of humanitarian assistance, while all attacks against humanitarian workers were condemned. Concern was expressed at the security situation in the country in particular the increased violent and terrorist activities by the Taliban, Al-Qaeda, illegally armed groups, criminals and those involved in the narcotics trade.

== Acts ==
UNAMA's mandate, as set out in resolutions 1662 (2006), 1746 (2007), 1806 (2008), 1868 (2009) and 1917 was extended until March 23, 2012. It was also guided by the principle of reinforcing Afghan ownership with a particular focus on:

(a) promoting more coherent international support for the Government's development and governance priorities;
(b) strengthening co-operation with international security forces as recommended in a report by the Secretary-General Ban Ki-moon;
(c) providing political outreach and good offices to support the implementation of the Afghan-led reconciliation and reintegration programmes;
(d) supporting as well as taking into account progress on electoral reform;
(e) working in co-operation with the Special Representative of the Secretary-General in a variety of areas.

It also stressed the importance of strengthening and expanding the presence of UNAMA and other United Nations entities, and encouraged the Secretary-General to continue his current efforts to take measures to address the security issues associated with such strengthening and expansion. The Council also addressed tackling opium production, respect for human rights, protection of humanitarian workers, demining, regional co-operation, refugees and enhancing the capabilities of the Afghan National Police and Afghan National Army. It also condemned terrorist activities and attacks on humanitarian workers, and welcomed efforts to improve the security situation.

A comprehensive review of United Nations support was to take place at the end of 2011.

== See also ==
- List of United Nations Security Council Resolutions 1901 to 2000 (2009–2011)
- Timeline of the War in Afghanistan (2001–present)
- War in Afghanistan (2001–present)
