= 2022 Pakistani airstrikes in Afghanistan =

April 2022 attacks in Eastern Afghanistan

- Part of the insurgency in Khyber Pakhtunkhwa and Afghanistan–Pakistan skirmishes
- 2022 Pakistani airstrikes in Afghanistan (Afghanistan) Location of bombing sites in Afghanistan
- Location: Spera District, Khost Province, Afghanistan; Shultan District, Kunar Province, Afghanistan
- Date: 16 April 2022; 4 years ago (15 Ramadan 1443 AH); 2:00–3:00 a.m. (AFT, UTC+04:30)
- Target: Pakistani Taliban
- Attack type: Rocket attacks, helicopter and jet strikes (Afghan claim); Drone strikes (Pakistani claim)
- Deaths: Per Afghanistan: 41 (Khost Province); 6 (Kunar Province); Per UNICEF: 20 children
- Injuries: Per Afghanistan: 22 (Khost Province); 1 (Kunar Province)

On 16 April 2022, the Pakistani military conducted predawn airstrikes on multiple targets in Afghanistan's Khost and Kunar provinces. Afghan officials said the attacks killed at least 47 civilians and injured 23 others. Initial reports described the attacks as either rocket strikes or aerial strikes carried out by a number of aircraft of the Pakistan Air Force, and Afghan officials claimed the operation was carried out by Pakistani military helicopters and jets. Pakistani officials initially denied Pakistan carried out the airstrikes, but Pakistani security officials later claimed the airstrikes involved drone strikes from inside Pakistani airspace, and that no aircraft were deployed. Some reports said the Pakistani airstrikes also targeted parts of Paktika Province.

The Taliban administration in Kabul did not release casualty figures, but acknowledged civilian deaths and diplomatically protested the incident. The airstrikes appeared to have been carried out as retaliation to an attack on a Pakistani military convoy in North Waziristan, Pakistan on 14 April, which had killed seven Pakistani soldiers. According to the Pakistani media and some Afghan media outlets, the attacks targeted militants belonging to Tehrik-i-Taliban Pakistan (TTP). Pakistani soldiers had also reportedly clashed with Taliban forces around 9 p.m. on 15 April in Gurbuz District, Khost Province, killing two Taliban fighters.

Protests against the attacks took place in several Afghan provinces including one in Nimruz Province, that turned violent when the Pakistani border forces allegedly opened fire and injured six protesters. In Bannu, Khyber Pakhtunkhwa, Pakistan, a sit-in started after the airstrikes. The United Nations Assistance Mission in Afghanistan (UNAMA) expressed concern over the civilian casualties in the airstrikes, and said it was working to establish the facts and verify losses.

== Background ==
Border tensions between Afghanistan and Pakistan rose after the Taliban takeover of Kabul in August 2021. The Taliban denied harboring anti-Pakistan militants in Afghanistan, but they were infuriated by Pakistan's erection of a barbed barrier along their 2,670 km (1,660 mi) border. Pakistan Airstrikes on Afghanistan were the first action which showed Tension between the two sides After U.S withdrawal from Afghanistan.

While Pakistan pursued a policy of supporting the Afghan Taliban for decades, Pakistan was simultaneously cracking down on Tehrik-i-Taliban Pakistan (TTP), or the Pakistani Taliban, the armed militant group that wanted to overthrow the Pakistani government. TTP was allied to the Afghan Taliban, shared a common ideology with them, and had assisted them in the 2001–2021 war, but the two groups maintained separate operation and command structures. Since 2007, TTP had been responsible for some of the worst terrorist attacks in Pakistan, including the 2014 Peshawar school massacre, and had targeted civilians and security forces in wave after wave of suicide bombings, improvised explosive device (IED) blasts, targeted killings and other forms of attacks. Despite these atrocities, Pakistan was unable to persuade the Afghan Taliban to crack down on TTP when the Taliban seized power in Afghanistan in August 2021. Instead, the Afghan Taliban mediated talks between Pakistan and TTP that led to the release of dozens of TTP prisoners in Pakistan. In November 2021, the Afghan Taliban helped facilitate a one-month ceasefire between the government of prime minister Imran Khan and TTP. The ceasefire was not renewed when it expired, however, and the TTP emir, Noor Wali Mehsud, asked his fighters to resume their attacks in Pakistan from 10 December 2021.

During the few months before the airstrikes, TTP had increased attacks on Pakistani security forces from sanctuaries inside Afghanistan. On 14 April 2022, the Pakistani military acknowledged that nearly 100 soldiers had been killed by militants since January, and said the Pakistani military had killed 128 armed militants and arrested 270 others near the border area with Afghanistan during the same period. On 14 April, eight Pakistani soldiers were killed in two ambushes in the Datakhel and Isham areas of Pakistan's North Waziristan, which borders Khost Province. Also on 14 April, Afghan border forces fired 35 shells and launched indiscriminate fire on Pakistani checkposts in Chitral District, Khyber Pakhtunkhwa, Pakistan. The onslaught went on for more than 6 hours. On 15 April, i.e. a day before the airstrikes, Pakistan's Ministry of Foreign Affairs summoned the Afghan chargé d'affaires in Islamabad to lodge a protest over the cross-border attacks and demand stern actions against the responsible.

Mehmood Shah, a retired Pakistani brigadier general who formerly headed security affairs in the tribal areas, stated he believed that the airstrikes were in retaliation to the surge in terror attacks in Pakistan. Gul Dad, a research director at Pakistan Institute for Conflict and Security Studies, said "whereas previously Pakistan would share intelligence on militants with the United States forces in Afghanistan, which then targeted them with drone strikes, now Islamabad is dependent on the Taliban to hunt them down." He added "Pakistan seems to have become frustrated and has now resorted to such extreme measures. The Taliban are also frustrated due to a lack of international recognition, especially from Pakistan." According to Rustam Shah Mohmand, a former Pakistani ambassador to Afghanistan, the tensions were unlikely to escalate much further, but the Taliban might still seek to lessen Afghanistan's dependence on Pakistan and would continue to oppose the border fence, the "real bone of contention."

== Casualties ==
In Khost Province, the airstrikes targeted several villages in Spera District, including Afghan-Dubai, Pasa Mela, Mir Sapar, Mandata, and Kanai, and struck refugee camps belonging to displaced persons from North Waziristan. Qudratullah, an 18-year-old resident of Mandata village, lost 27 of his relatives to the airstrikes, including his 16-year-old wife, who was crushed beneath the rubble. His 30-year-old brother Zargit, who survived, lost all four of his daughters, all under 11. Qudratullah said, "I'm devastated. I lost my wife, my relatives, our home, our vehicles, our animals, everything."

Peer Jannat, a 25-year-old resident of Afghan-Dubai village in Khost Province, told Al Jazeera that he had woken up at 2:30 a.m. on 16 April to prepare for suhur, the predawn meal consumed ahead of the daily fasts in the holy month of Ramadan. "Just as we were sitting down, we heard sounds of drones followed by sounds of jets, seconds later we heard an explosion. They [Pakistan military] were bombing us. In our area, they targeted two places, and bombarded three more places in the next village. Dozens of people were killed, many of them women and children, in some families only a child survived." Jannat recalled spending the following 6 to 8 hours digging survivors from the rubble of their homes. "Five homes were destroyed in just our neighborhood; they were completely flattened, burying entire families within them," he said, adding that the other homes, including his own, were badly damaged. "We didn't have resources to help our neighbors, to extract them from their destroyed homes. People from neighboring villages came to help us." When he went to help families in the surrounding villages of Mir Sapar and Kanai, he saw similar images. "Aside from human lives, people's homes, cattle and vehicles have also been destroyed," he said, adding that these also included transport vehicles used by locals for trade. "Most people in this area are refugees who fled from North Waziristan due to the Pakistani military operations there." Jannat added, "for many, their livelihoods are lost." Rangin, a 30-year-old resident of Kanai village, who was rescued, but whose wife and three daughters aged 1, 3 and 10 were killed in the airstrikes, asked "why are they bombing us? We are just refugees. This is a cruelty."

Doctors at the local clinics in Spera District said they were unable to give emergency care owing to a shortage of resources, as the country's economy had nearly collapsed due to the freezing of aid and the US sanctions following the Taliban takeover of Kabul in August 2021. One doctor from a local clinic said "we have received many casualties from the recent bombardments, and we are stretched thin without enough personnel or supplies. We are not in the same position or capacity we were last year. People with injuries are discharged after basic treatment because we don't have enough facilities. In critical cases, we refer them to private hospitals, but not everyone can afford to receive treatments there." Shabir Ahmad Osmani, director of information and culture in Khost, stated that the 41 people killed and the 22 others who were injured in the province were all civilians, mainly women and children.

In Kunar Province, the attacks took place in the Chogam village of Shultan District, killing three girls, two boys, and one woman, and wounding one man. Najibullah Hanif, the provincial director of information and culture, stated "Pakistani forces have been shelling using heavy artillery for the past three days on Marawara, Shultan and Nari districts in Kunar Province." The target of the attacks in Kunar Province was a militant, Umar Bajauri, but locals said he was not home at the time and instead his family was hit.

Mohamed Ag Ayoya, UNICEF Representative in Afghanistan, said the UNICEF confirmed that a total of 20 children were killed during the airstrikes in Khost and Kunar provinces. He said UNICEF teams were "on the ground supporting those affected, including with mobile teams providing health, nutrition and psycho-social services." The Taliban administration in Kabul did not provide any figures for the number of people killed or injured, although the Permanent Mission of Afghanistan to the United Nations, run by former government officials, corroborated that more than 40 people were killed, including women and children. The total death toll in the attacks cannot be independently verified yet, but the United Nations Assistance Mission in Afghanistan (UNAMA) stated it was working to verify the extent of losses.

The Pakistani government remained silent on whether Pakistan was behind the airstrikes. However, Pakistani security officials said Tehrik-i-Taliban Pakistan (TTP) suffered heavy losses in the strike. They added that TTP had cordoned off the area to hide the killing of its commanders. According to the officials, TTP had set up bases along the Afghan border which were even beyond the control of the Afghan Taliban government. TTP, on the other hand, said the bombs hit migrant camps inhabited by those who had fled from Pakistan's former tribal areas into Afghanistan.

The residents in Khost Province who were attacked in the airstrikes insisted that their settlement did not house any TTP fighters. Peer Jannat said "personally, I don't know anyone who is part of TTP here. Residents are civilians who have been running from violence. In fact, most of the victims were women and children." The target of the attacks in Khost Province was the Gul Bahadur faction of TTP, which Pakistan suspected was behind an April 14 ambush in North Waziristan that killed seven Pakistani soldiers. Pakistan's airstrikes inside Afghanistan's territory have sparked a diplomatic row between the two countries. The air strike grossly violated international law.

== Reactions ==
=== Afghan government ===
The acting Afghan Foreign Minister, Amir Khan Muttaqi, said he summoned the Pakistani ambassador in Kabul, Mansoor Ahmad Khan, after the airstrikes and gave him a diplomatic démarche. "All military encroachments including those in Kunar and Khost provinces must be prevented as acts as such will deteriorate bilateral relations between Pakistan and Afghanistan. Deterioration of relations will have dire consequences," Muttaqi said. He added that such military violations should be avoided as they can be exploited by "ill-wishers and groups with vested interests." Zabiullah Mujahid, the chief Taliban spokesman, warned: "The Islamic Emirate of Afghanistan calls on the Pakistani side not to test the patience of Afghans on such issues and not repeat the same mistake again, otherwise it will have bad consequences." "This is a cruelty and it is paving the way for enmity between Afghanistan and Pakistan. We are using all options to prevent repetitions of such attacks and calling for our sovereignty to be respected," Mujahid said. He added "the defeat of the United States eight months ago was a good lesson to aggressors who want to disrespect Afghanistan's territory and freedom." The Ministry of Defense called the attacks tyrannical and warned "no country should provoke Afghanistan." Mullah Yaqoob, the acting Defense Minister, said the airstrikes were an "invasion" by neighboring Pakistan that was tolerated by the Taliban administration "because of national interests," but "next time we might not tolerate it."

The Permanent Mission of Afghanistan to the United Nations stated that the attacks were an act of "aggression of Pakistan against the territorial integrity of Afghanistan" and that it "breached the international laws, principals of the UN Charter, the UN General Assembly and UN Security Council resolutions." According to the statement, Pakistan broke UN Security Council Resolution 1453 (2002) on the "Kabul Declaration on Good-Neighbourly Relations." Naseer Ahmad Faiq, Afghanistan's envoy at the UN, lodged an official complaint against Pakistan's airstrikes at the UN Security Council.

Afghan diplomatic missions run by former government officials condemned the airstrikes in a joint statement, and asked the UN Security Council to take action against Pakistan. Noorullah Raghi, a former diplomat said "the Pakistan airstrikes on Afghanistan are obvious acts of aggression and a crime against humanity, in which civilians and innocent people were targeted. It underestimates the Taliban as well."

Former Afghan President Hamid Karzai stated the attack was a breach of Afghanistan's sovereignty, a violation of international norms, and a crime against humanity.

=== Pakistani government ===
Pakistan's Foreign Office stated it was "looking into" reports concerning the military action. The government and the Pakistan Armed Forces did not publicly comment on the airstrikes. The Pakistani media reported that the attacks targeted Tehrik-i-Taliban Pakistan (TTP) militants in Afghanistan. The Pakistan Embassy in Kabul denied there had been any airstrikes in Afghanistan, but said its ambassador Mansoor Ahmad Khan and Taliban authorities had discussed a resolution of border issues.

On 17 April, the Foreign Office released a strongly-worded statement condemning the use of Afghan soil by terrorists "with impunity to carry out activities inside Pakistan." According to the statement, both countries had been engaged for several months to ensure security along the border. However, attacks from proscribed terrorist groups against Pakistan's border posts had not ceased, and caused casualties on the Pakistani side, with the most recent incident on 14 April resulting in the killing of seven Pakistan Army soldiers. The Foreign Office warned that Pakistan had repeatedly called on the Afghan government to prevent such attacks, to little avail. The statement also reaffirmed "respect for Afghanistan's independence, sovereignty and territorial integrity" while adding that "Pakistan will continue to work closely with the Afghan government to strengthen bilateral relations in all fields."

Mohsin Dawar, a member of the National Assembly of Pakistan from North Waziristan and chairman of the National Democratic Movement (NDM), called the incident "highly tragic." He added that the displaced persons who were attacked were from North Waziristan, but they had crossed into Khost Province before Operation Zarb-e-Azb which was launched on 15 June 2014 in North Waziristan by the Pakistan Armed Forces. Dawar called on Pakistan's new government of prime minister Shehbaz Sharif to take action against "those who ordered this operation" in Khost and Kunar provinces, and to revisit Pakistan's Afghan policy, particularly that there are "good Taliban and bad Taliban."

=== Pakistani Taliban ===
Muhammad Khurasani, a spokesman for Tehrik-i-Taliban Pakistan (TTP) or the Pakistani Taliban, said "we want to tell the Pakistani army that every war has a principle, and Pakistan has violated every principle of war up to date. We challenge the Pakistani army to fight us in the battlefield instead of bombing oppressed people and refugee camps." In response to a question about the Afghan Taliban, Noor Wali Mehsud, the emir of the Pakistani Taliban, wrote, "we are facing no resistance or opposition from the Afghan Taliban."

=== United States government ===
Responding to a question about the airstrikes, the United States Department of State Spokesperson, Ned Price, said "we are aware of the reports of Pakistani airstrikes in Afghanistan, but we'd refer you to the Pakistani government for comment." Endorsing Pakistan's policy toward the militants who used their bases in Afghanistan for carrying out attacks in Pakistan, Price said "we view Pakistan as an important stakeholder, an important partner, with whom we are engaging and have engaged as we work together to bring about an Afghanistan that is more stable, is more secure, is more prosperous, and importantly an Afghanistan that respects the basic and fundamental rights of its people, all of its people, including its minorities, its women, its girls." Price added, "for almost 75 years our relationship with Pakistan has been a vital one," and "we look forward to working closely" with the new government of prime minister Shehbaz Sharif "across regional and international issues."

=== Chinese government ===
China's reaction to the Pakistani airstrikes in Afghanistan was cautious. In response to a question about the airstrikes, the spokesperson of Chinese Foreign Ministry, Wang Wenbin, said "Afghanistan and Pakistan are close neighbors with traditional friendship with China. We believe that the two countries can properly settle each other's concerns through dialogue and consultations, and jointly maintain regional peace and tranquility." Wang added that China had been trying to actively engage with the Taliban since immediately after the Taliban takeover of Kabul the previous year.

=== United Nations ===
The United Nations Assistance Mission in Afghanistan (UNAMA) stated "UNAMA is deeply concerned by reports of civilian casualties, including women and children, as a result of airstrikes in Khost and Kunar provinces last night. Civilians are never a target. UNAMA is working to establish facts on the ground and verify the extent of losses."

Mohamed Ag Ayoya, UNICEF Representative in Afghanistan, confirmed that a total of 20 children were killed in their homes during the airstrikes in Khost and Kunar provinces, and said "we are shocked and saddened by this needless tragedy, and we send our heartfelt condolences to the families and friends of all those affected. Violence against children, in all forms, must stop." He added, "UNICEF teams are on the ground supporting those affected, including with mobile teams providing health, nutrition and psycho-social services. Additionally, we have provided tents, hygiene kits for girls’ and women's sanitary needs, winter kits that include warm clothes, recreational kits with games and activities for children, soap and water purification tablets."

== Protests ==
Hundreds of civilians took to the streets in Khost to protest against the incident, chanting anti-Pakistan slogans. In Kunar Province, residents expressed their "dissatisfaction about the Taliban's silence on the attacks." In Nangarhar Province, a number of residents gathered in Ghanikhel to protest the airstrikes. In Kandahar, the residents organized a rally and called on the Taliban to give a strong response to Pakistan. In Nimruz Province, as people protested against the airstrikes, Pakistani border forces were reported to have opened fire on them, injuring six protesters.

In Bannu, Khyber Pakhtunkhwa, Pakistan, a sit-in was started by the Madakhel Wazir tribe of Pashtuns after the airstrikes. Manzoor Pashteen, who is the chairman of the Pashtun Tahafuz Movement (PTM), and other protesters demanded justice for the victims from Waziristan killed in the airstrikes, and called on the governments of both countries to play their part in ensuring the security of the people. Pashteen demanded that the airstrikes be investigated.

In the United Kingdom, a number of Afghans protested against the airstrikes outside the High Commission of Pakistan in London. Protests were also held against Pakistan in Paris, France, and in front of the White House in Washington, D.C., United States.

== Compensation ==
The Taliban announced a financial package of 20,000 Afghanis ($230) for the affected families. However, analysts said it was insufficient to compensate for the loss of property and livelihood. A number of youths in Khost collected donations to help the families of the victims.

== See also ==
- Afghanistan-Pakistan relations
- Afghanistan–Pakistan border skirmishes
- Anti-Afghan sentiment
- Iran-Pakistan border skirmishes
