= United Nations Security Council Resolution 1917 =

UN Security Council Resolution 1917
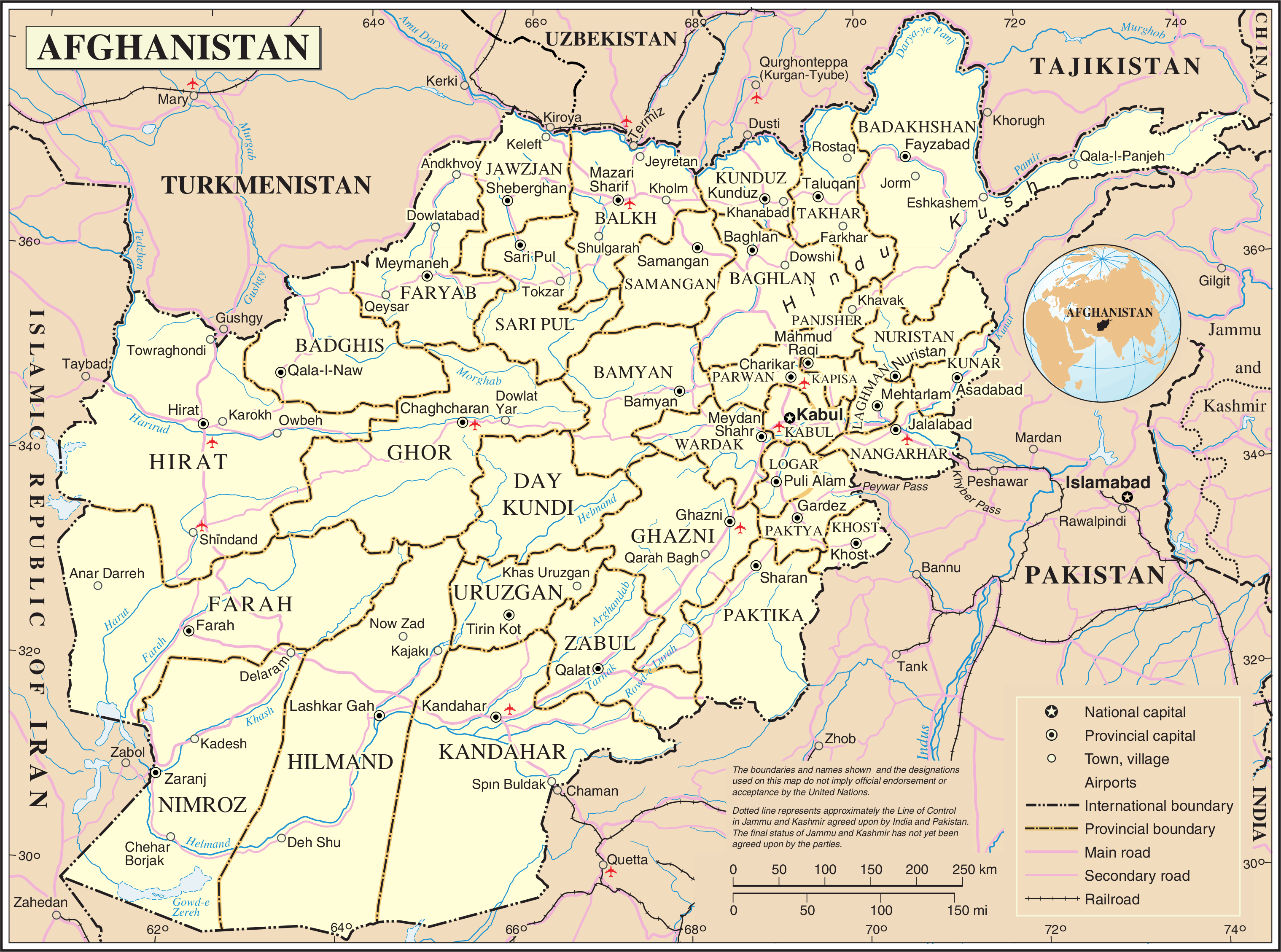
- Afghanistan
- Date: 22 March 2010
- Meeting no.: 6,290
- Code: S/RES/1917 (Document)
- Subject: The situation in Afghanistan
- Voting summary: 15 voted for; None voted against; None abstained
- Result: Adopted

Security Council composition
- Permanent members: China; France; Russia; United Kingdom; United States
- Non-permanent members: Austria; Bosnia–Herzegovina; Brazil; Gabon; Japan; Lebanon; Mexico; Nigeria; Turkey; Uganda

United Nations Security Council Resolution 1917, adopted unanimously on March 22, 2010, after recalling its previous resolutions on Afghanistan, in particular resolutions 1868 (2009), 1662 (2006) and 1659 (2006), the Council extended the mandate of the United Nations Assistance Mission in Afghanistan (UNAMA) until March 23, 2011 and realigned its mandate to assist with government-led recovery efforts.

== Observations ==
The Council recognised that there was no purely military solution to the situation in Afghanistan and reiterated its support to the Afghan people in rebuilding their country. Support was given to the Afghanistan Compact, Afghanistan National Development Strategy and National Drugs Control Strategy. It was stressed that the central role of the United Nations in Afghanistan was promoting peace and stability by leading the efforts of the international community. The Council also welcomed the continued commitment of the international community to support the stability and development of the country, particularly those that were increasing civilian and humanitarian efforts to assist the Government of Afghanistan and its people.

The resolution stressed the need for a transparent, credible and democratic process in the lead up to the 2010 parliamentary elections. The Council also recognised the interconnected nature of the challenges in Afghanistan with regards to progress on security, governance, human rights, the rule of law and development, as well as the issues of anti‑corruption, counter-narcotics and transparency. The need for greater co-operation between UNAMA and International Security Assistance Force was noted, with respect to Resolution 1890 (2009).

Also important to the Council was the humanitarian situation in the country and the delivery and co-ordination of humanitarian assistance, while all attacks against humanitarian workers. Concern was expressed at the security situation in the country in particular the increased violent and terrorist activities by the Taliban, Al-Qaeda, illegally armed groups, criminals and those involved in the narcotics trade.

== Acts ==
UNAMA's mandate, as set out in resolutions 1662, 1746 and 1806, was extended until March 23, 2011. It was also guided by the principle of reinforcing Afghan ownership with a particular focus on:

(a) promoting more coherent international support for the Government's development and governance priorities;
(b) strengthening co-operation with international security forces as recommended in a report by the Secretary-General Ban Ki-moon;
(c) providing political outreach and good offices to support the implementation of the Afghan-led reconciliation and reintegration programmes;
(d) supporting as well as taking into account progress on electoral reform commitments agreed at the London Conference in January 2010;
(e) working in co-operation with the Special Representative of the Secretary-General to promote humanitarian efforts.

It also stressed the importance of strengthening and expanding the presence of UNAMA and other United Nations entities, and encouraged the Secretary-General to continue his current efforts to take measures to address the security issues associated with such strengthening and expansion. The Council also addressed tackling opium production, respect for human rights, protection of humanitarian workers, demining, regional co-operation and enhancing the capabilities of the Afghan National Police and Afghan National Army.

== See also ==
- List of United Nations Security Council Resolutions 1901 to 2000 (2009–2011)
- Timeline of the War in Afghanistan (2001–present)
- War in Afghanistan (2001–present)
