= Afghanistan–Mexico relations =

- Afghanistan: Mexico

The nations of Afghanistan and Mexico established diplomatic relations in 1961. Both nations are members of the United Nations and the World Trade Organization.

== History ==
Due to a vast distance between Afghanistan and Mexico, the relation between the two nations never developed into one of high priority. Both nations established diplomatic ties on the 27 June 1961. Since then, bilateral relations have mainly been conducted at international forums such as the United Nations.

In 1962, Mexico accredited its first ambassador to Afghanistan, resident in New Delhi, India. The ambassador was Nobel Prize winner Octavio Paz. During Paz's time as ambassador in India, he kept a journal of his travels to Afghanistan, writing about his journey from New Delhi to Kabul and his experiences and he documented presenting his credentials to then Afghan King Zahir Shah. Paz turned his journal into a book called Viento Entero.

From 1980 to 1981, Mexico was on the United Nations Security Council and voted in favor of Resolution 462 condemning the Soviet invasion of Afghanistan. The Resolution was adopted. When Mexico was again a member of the UN Security Council from 2002 to 2003; it voted on numerous occasions in favor of maintaining Afghanistan's independence and sovereignty (Resolution 1444 and Resolution 1453) and extending the UN Assistance Mission mandate in the country (Resolution 1471). From 2009 to 2010, Mexico again as a non-permanent member of the UN Security Council voted in favor of UN Resolution 1868 and UN Resolution 1890.

Since the beginning of the U.S led invasion of Afghanistan in 2001; many Afghan migrants have travelled to Mexico in order to enter the United States. Furthermore, several Mexican narcotic cartels have been operating in Afghanistan by using fake "front" companies to hire smugglers in the country to smuggle drugs and weapons from Afghanistan to Europe and the United States. Throughout the years, several Afghan migrants have traveled through Mexico to reach the United States and are forced to wait in Mexico while their U.S. asylum cases are reviewed and processed.

In August 2021, with the return of control of the Taliban in Afghanistan; Mexico announced it would issue refugee visas to Afghan refugees, in particular women and girls, from its embassy in Tehran, Iran and resettle them in Mexico. Immediately afterwards, close to 2000 Afghan refugees arrived to Mexico.

Afghanistan's embassy in the United States was accredited to Mexico until it closed on 16 March 2022.

== Trade ==
In 2023, bilateral trade between Afghanistan and Mexico amounted to US$6 million. Afghanistan's main exports to Mexico include: apparatus for protecting electrical circuits, electronics, telephones and mobile phones, plastic, nails, clothing, and spices. Mexico's main exports to Afghanistan include: telephones and mobile phones, electrical wires and cables, pipes and pipe fittings, alcohol, fruits and nuts, and parts and accessories for motor vehicles.

== Diplomatic missions ==
- Afghanistan does not have an accreditation for Mexico.
- Mexico is accredited to Afghanistan from its embassy in Tehran, Iran.
