= United Nations Security Council Resolution 1707 =

UN Security Council Resolution 1707
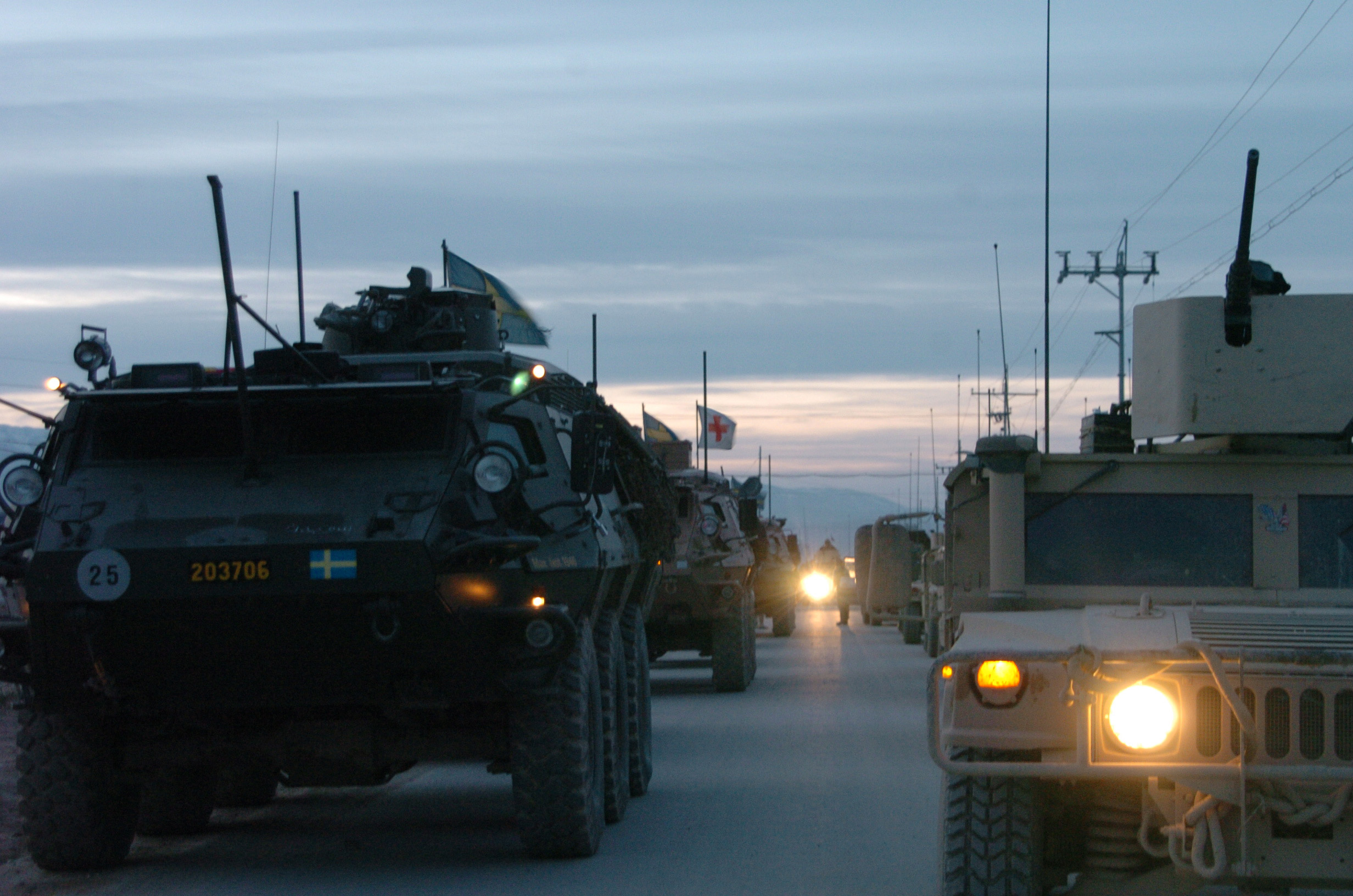
- ISAF units
- Date: 12 September 2006
- Meeting no.: 5,521
- Code: S/RES/1623 (Document)
- Subject: The situation in Afghanistan
- Voting summary: 15 voted for; None voted against; None abstained
- Result: Adopted

Security Council composition
- Permanent members: China; France; Russia; United Kingdom; United States
- Non-permanent members: Argentina; Rep. of the Congo; Denmark; Ghana; Greece; Japan; Peru; Qatar; Slovakia; Tanzania

United Nations Security Council Resolution 1707 was adopted unanimously on September 12, 2006. After reaffirming all resolutions on the situation in Afghanistan, particularly resolutions 1386 (2001), 1413 (2002), 1444 (2002), 1510 (2003), 1563 (2004), 1623 (2005) and 1659 (2006) and resolutions 1368 (2001) and 1373 (2001) on terrorism, resolution 1707 extended the authorisation of the International Security Assistance Force (ISAF) until mid-October 2007.

== Resolution ==
=== Observations ===
The Security Council recognised that the responsibility for providing security and law and order throughout Afghanistan resided with Afghans themselves. The Council acknowledged the interconnected nature of the challenges in the country, reiterating the importance of progress in relation to security, governance and combatting the narcotics trade. It stressed the importance of the Afghanistan Compact as a framework for co-operation between Afghanistan and the international community.

There were concerns about the security situation in Afghanistan, including increased activity by Al-Qaeda, the Taliban, armed groups and those involved in the illegal drugs trade. In this context, the resolution called on all Afghan parties to refrain from the use of violence or armed groups and to engage constructively in the development of the country; security sector reform was essential.

The resolution welcomed the contributions of the Afghan National Security Forces, ISAF and Operation Enduring Freedom (OEF) towards security in Afghanistan, particularly the expansion of ISAF into southern and eastern areas of the country. It also appreciated the United Kingdom for taking lead of ISAF in place of Italy, and commended nations that had contributed to NATO. The Council determined the situation in Afghanistan to be a threat to international peace and security.

=== Acts ===
Acting under Chapter VII of the United Nations Charter, the Council renewed the mandate of ISAF for a period of twelve months beyond October 13, 2006. States participating in the force were authorised to use all necessary measures to fulfil the mandate, while other Member States were asked to contribute personnel and resources to the operation.

The force was called upon to work with the Afghan government, OEF and Special Representative of the Secretary-General. Finally, the ISAF leadership was requested to provide quarterly reports on the implementation of its mandate.

== See also ==
- War in Afghanistan (1978–present)
- List of United Nations Security Council Resolutions 1701 to 1800 (2006–2008)
- United Nations Assistance Mission in Afghanistan
- War in Afghanistan (2001–present)
