= 1995 attack on the Embassy of Pakistan in Kabul =

Attack by Afghan protestors on the Embassy of Pakistan in Kabul, Afghanistan

1995 attack on the Pakistan Embassy in Kabul
- Part of the Afghan Civil War (1992–1996)
- Kabul (Afghanistan)
- Location: Embassy of Pakistan, Kabul, Afghanistan
- Date: 6 September 1995
- Target: Pakistani embassy
- Deaths: 1
- Injuries: 26

The 1995 attack on the Pakistan Embassy in Kabul occurred on 6 September 1995 when up to 5,000 protestors attacked and sacked the embassy of Pakistan in Kabul, Afghanistan, after the Taliban militia had captured Herat from the internationally recognised Islamic State of Afghanistan. One person was killed and twenty six others, including the Pakistani ambassador, were injured. The attack occurred due to the Afghan peoples belief that Pakistan had helped the Taliban to take the city.

== Background ==
The attack against the Pakistani embassy by pro-government protestors in Kabul took place a day after the Taliban militia had successfully established control over Herat. When the Taliban took control of Herat, they arrested hundreds of its citizens, closed down all the schools and "forcibly implement[ed] their social bans and Sharia law, even more fiercely than in Kandahar". The Taliban imposed as rulers over the city and region extremist Taliban officials "many of whom" did not even speak the local regional language Persian.

Kamal Matinuddin, Lt. General of the Pakistan army and former member of Pakistan's diplomatic corps, alleges the Afghan government sacked the embassy in "retaliation for the capture of Herat" because they "felt" the Taliban could have only done so with Pakistan's help. But according to William Maley, the Director of the Asia-Pacific College of Diplomacy, the attack by angry protestors against the Pakistan embassy was due to "bitter resentment towards Pakistan which had built up among the victims of Pakistan's strategy" first using Gulbuddin Hekmatyar in a destructive bombardment campaign against Kabul and then the Taliban to install a client in Afghanistan.

De facto, scholars such as Pakistani analyst Ahmed Rashid, write:

"[T]he Taliban had spent the summer [of 1995] rebuilding their forces with arms, ammunition and vehicles provided by Pakistan and Saudi Arabia and a new command structure created with the help of ISI advisers. The ISI also helped broker an agreement, never made public, between the Taliban and General Rashid Dostum ... to repair Mig fighters and helicopters the Taliban had captured a year earlier in Kandahar, thereby creating the Taliban's first airpower. ... the Taliban quickly mobilised some 25,000 men, many of them fresh volunteers from Pakistan."

According to "Pakistan and the Taliban" by Ahmed Rashid, also published in April 1998 as a column in The Nation, Pakistan furthermore directly provided limited "military support" in the Taliban's September 1995 offensive against Herat which led to the capture of the city and the subsequent anti-Pakistan protests in Kabul.

Rizwan Hussein in "Pakistan and the emergence of Islamic militancy in Afghanistan" summarises: "As has now been established by several scholarly and journalistic works, the Pakistan military establishment directly assisted the Taliban's rise and subsequent capture of this region [Herat] in Afghanistan between 1995 and 1996." The Pakistan Institute of International Affairs describes Pakistan's support to the Taliban as "at its height" in 1995. The Pakistani ambassador to Kabul, Qazi Humayun, himself alongside Pakistan's Consul General in Herat, Colonel Imam, later attended Taliban meetings in Kandahar. These meetings discussed how the Taliban could best conquer Afghanistan militarily and how "best to impose Sharia law" over Afghanistan.

Pakistani politicians during that time repeatedly denied supporting the Taliban, which has been described by reliable sources as an explicit 'policy of denial'.

== See also ==
- Afghanistan–Pakistan relations
- Sack of Pakistani consulates in Afghanistan 1955
- 2003 attack on the Embassy of Pakistan in Kabul, Afghanistan
- List of massacres in Afghanistan
