= United Nations Security Council Resolution 1536 =

UN Security Council Resolution 1536
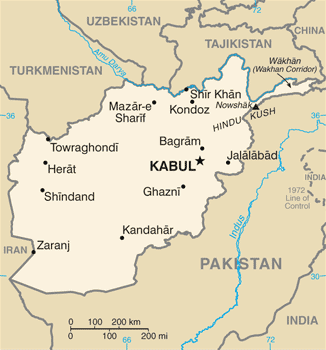
- Afghanistan
- Date: 26 March 2004
- Meeting no.: 4,937
- Code: S/RES/1536 (Document)
- Subject: The situation in Afghanistan
- Voting summary: 15 voted for; None voted against; None abstained
- Result: Adopted

Security Council composition
- Permanent members: China; France; Russia; United Kingdom; United States
- Non-permanent members: Algeria; Angola; Benin; Brazil; Chile; Germany; Pakistan; Philippines; Romania; Spain

United Nations Security Council resolution 1536, adopted unanimously on 26 March 2004, after reaffirming all resolutions on the situation in Afghanistan, particularly Resolution 1471 (2003), the council extended the mandate of the United Nations Assistance Mission in Afghanistan (UNAMA) for an additional period of twelve months until 26 March 2005.

== Resolution ==
=== Observations ===
The Security Council reaffirmed its commitment to the sovereignty, territorial integrity, independence and unity of Afghanistan and welcomed the constitution adopted by the Loya Jirga on 4 January 2004. It also endorsed the agreement of the "Kabul Declaration on Good Neighbourly Relations" and stressed the central role of the United Nations in assisting the Afghan people in rebuilding their country. The legitimacy of the Afghan Transitional Administration and endorsement of the Bonn Agreement was reaffirmed, including a planned international conference pledging long-term commitment to Afghanistan.

Additionally, the preamble of the resolution stressed the importance of extending government authority throughout the country, as well as security sector reform and a comprehensive demobilisation, disarmament and rehabilitation (DDR) programme.

=== Acts ===
The Security Council stressed the need for the provision of adequate security and donor support for the holding of elections. The Afghan authorities were urged to put in place a representative electoral process, including that of women and refugees. In this regard, the acceleration of voter registration was called for.

The resolution welcomed progress made since the establishment of a DDR programme in October 2003 and contribution of the International Observer Group. Meanwhile, efforts to combat the illegal drug trade by the Afghan authorities was welcomed by the council, while at the same time it was stressed that such efforts could not be separated from the creation of a strong economy and secure environment through increased efforts of the international community along the trafficking routes.

Welcoming the appointment of Jean Arnault as the Special Representative of the Secretary-General for Afghanistan, the council requested UNAMA, in conjunction with the United Nations High Commissioner for Human Rights, to assist the Afghan Human Rights Commission. The Afghan parties were further urged to ensure the freedom of movement and safety of UNAMA personnel.

The Council praised progress made by the International Security Assistance Force in expanding its presence beyond the capital Kabul and in implementing its mandate contained in resolutions 1444 (2002) and 1510 (2003). Furthermore, the development of the Afghan National Army and Afghan National Police was welcomed by Council members. Finally, the Secretary-General Kofi Annan was directed to report regularly on the situation in Afghanistan and the future role of UNAMA.

== See also ==
- War in Afghanistan (1978–present)
- List of United Nations Security Council Resolutions 1501 to 1600 (2003–2005)
- War in Afghanistan (2001–present)
