= 2003 attack on the Embassy of Pakistan in Kabul =

Attack in Afghanistan

Coordinates: 34.9063°N 69.2350°E

Kabul (Afghanistan)

The 2003 attack on the Pakistan Embassy in Kabul occurred when up to 500 Afghan protesters overran the embassy of Pakistan on 9 July 2003. It was the second major attack since 1995, when the embassy was also assaulted by Afghan protesters.

== Attack ==
The prior demonstration and protests against the alleged border incursions by Pakistan Armed Forces culminated in the attack and ransacking of the premises. The protesters shattered windows, broke down doors, and set the Pakistan flag on fire. No one was injured. The High Commissioner Rustam Shah Mohmand of Pakistan accused the Afghan government of being unable to police its own capital, demanding compensation and announcing the embassy would remain closed. After the incident, Afghan President Hamid Karzai officially apologised for the rampage and made a personal apology during a 25-minute conversation, stating that no such incident would happen again.

At approximately 9:30 AM, 500 protesters chanting "Anti-Pakistan slogans" descended on the Pakistan High Commission building. Testimony of nearby Western diplomats and staff revealed that Afghan officials were aware of the protest, though they apparently assigned no extra security.

== See also ==
- 1995 attack on the Pakistan embassy in Kabul
- List of massacres in Afghanistan
