= Azizuddin (disambiguation) =

ʿAzīzuddīn (IPA: /ʕaziːzuddiːn/) (Arabic: عزيز الدين, lit. "honourable of the faith") is an Arabic personal name, surname or title.

Notable persons with this name are:

- Mirza Azizuddin Ahmed, better known as Alamgir II (r. 1754–1759), the fifteenth Mughal Emperor
- Azizuddin Ahmad (1897–1968), Bengali politician and minister
- Fakir Azizuddin (1780–1845), Prime Minister of the Sikh Empire
- Tariq Azizuddin, Pakistani diplomat
