= Dhakki =

Coordinates: 34°18′17″N 71°46′24″E

Dhakki Ameer Abad Pull
- Town and union council
- Interactive map of Dhakki
- Country: Pakistan
- Province: Khyber Pakhtunkhwa
- District: Charsadda District

Government
- Time zone: UTC+5 (PST)

Dhakki is a town and union council of Charsadda District in Khyber Pakhtunkhwa province of Pakistan. It is located at 34°18'17N 71°46'24E and has an altitude of 359 metres (1181 feet).

The village has a higher secondary school for boys, a high school for girls and a basic health unit (BHU). It is about 50 kilometers from Peshawar. The soil is very fertile, irrigated by Upper Swat Canal. The main crops are sugarcane, tobacco, wheat, maize and vegetables. Apricot, plum, peach and pear orchards are stretched all over the landscape. The population is around 40000.

== Notable people ==
- Rustam Shah Mohmand - Former Interior Secretary of Pakistan, ambassador to Afghanistan.
