= United Nations Security Council Resolution 1746 =

UN Security Council Resolution 1746
- Date: 23 March 2007
- Meeting no.: 5,645
- Code: S/RES/1746 (Document)
- Subject: The situation in Afghanistan
- Voting summary: 15 voted for; None voted against; None abstained
- Result: Adopted

Security Council composition
- Permanent members: China; France; Russia; United Kingdom; United States
- Non-permanent members: Belgium; Rep. of the Congo; Ghana; Indonesia; Italy; Panama; Peru; Qatar; Slovakia; South Africa

United Nations Security Council Resolution 1746, adopted unanimously on March 23, 2007, after reaffirming all resolutions on the situation in Afghanistan, including resolutions 1659 (2006) and 1662 (2006), the Council extended the mandate of the United Nations Assistance Mission in Afghanistan (UNAMA) for an additional period of twelve months, until March 23, 2008.

== Resolution ==
=== Observations ===
The preamble of Resolution 1746 reaffirmed the Security Council's commitment to the sovereignty, territorial integrity, independence and unity of Afghanistan and offered support for the implementation of the "Afghanistan Compact" and Afghanistan National Development Strategy.

Meanwhile, the resolution recognised the interconnected nature of the problems in Afghanistan and stressed the mutually reinforcing issues of progress relating to security, governance and development. It was also important to combat narcotic and terrorist threats posed by the Taliban, Al-Qaeda and other groups.

It also reaffirmed the role of the United Nations in Afghanistan, particularly the synergies in the objectives of UNAMA and the International Security Assistance Force (ISAF), in addition to its support for the 2002 Kabul Declaration on Good-Neighbourly Relations.

=== Acts ===
The Security Council renewed the mandate of UNAMA for an additional twelve months from the date of the adoption of the current resolution. UNAMA was instructed to promote a more "coherent international engagement" in support of Afghanistan, while its expansion into the provinces was welcomed. The Afghan authorities and international community were urged to implement the "Afghanistan Compact" fully and meet benchmarks.

The resolution welcomed progress in the disarmament, demobilisation and reintegration programme and new strategies relating to justice reform and drugs control with relation to opium. There was a need for Afghan parties to engage in an inclusive political dialogue, and to address corruption.

The Security Council called for respect of human rights and international humanitarian law throughout Afghanistan, calling on UNAMA and the United Nations High Commissioner for Refugees (UNHCR) to assist in the implementation of human rights aspects of the Afghan constitution.

Furthermore, Afghanistan was called upon to co-operate with UNAMA in the course of its mandate, ensuring its safety and freedom of movement. ISAF, including Operation Enduring Freedom, were asked to address the threat of terrorism and extremism posed by Al-Qaeda, the Taliban and other groups in the country. At the same time, the promotion of confidence-building measures was urged between Afghanistan and neighbouring countries.

Finally, the Secretary-General Kofi Annan was directed to report every six months on the situation in Afghanistan.

== See also ==
- War in Afghanistan (1978–present)
- List of United Nations Security Council Resolutions 1701 to 1800 (2006–2008)
- War in Afghanistan (2001–present)
