= Abdul Hakim Mujahid =

Afghan politician

Mulla Abdul Hakim Mujahid
- Education: Jamia Uloom Islamia Banuri Town Karachi
- Occupation: Politician
- Known for: Taliban politician, Afghan Ambassador to Pakistan

Mulla Abdul Hakim Mujahid is an Afghan politician of the Taliban political / militant movement. Mujahid has served as Ambassadors of Afghanistan to Pakistan in the previous Islamic Emirate of Afghanistan (1996–2001).

Mujahid served as the Taliban's envoy and United Nations point of contact.

== Education ==
He is a graduate of Jamia Uloom Islamia Banuri Town Karachi. He is fluent in Urdu and Arabic as well as English.
