= United Nations Security Council Resolution 1471 =

UN Security Council Resolution 1471
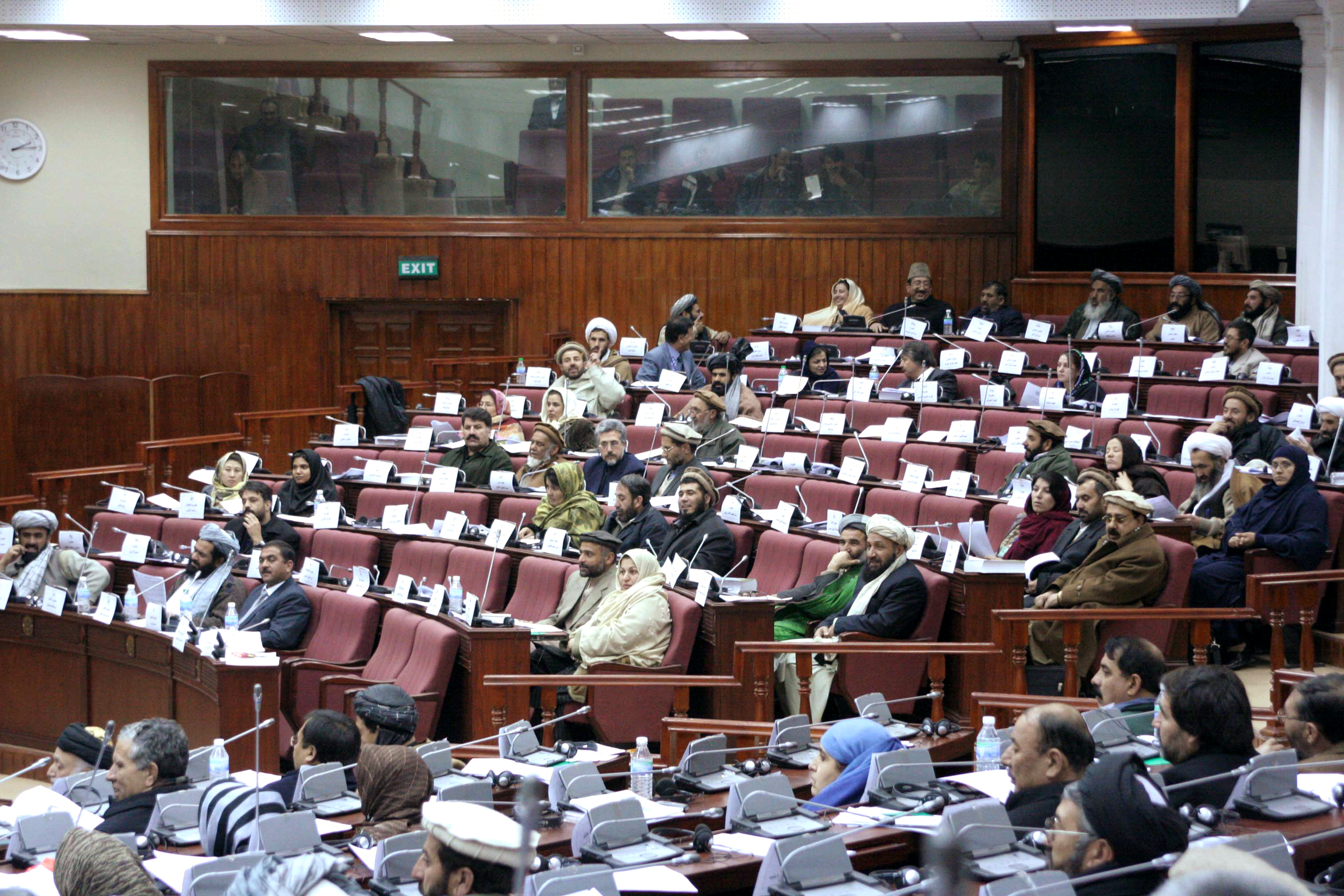
- The Afghan parliament
- Date: 28 March 2003
- Meeting no.: 4,730
- Code: S/RES/1471 (Document)
- Subject: The situation in Afghanistan
- Voting summary: 15 voted for; None voted against; None abstained
- Result: Adopted

Security Council composition
- Permanent members: China; France; Russia; United Kingdom; United States
- Non-permanent members: Angola; Bulgaria; Chile; Cameroon; Germany; Guinea; Mexico; Pakistan; Spain; Syria

United Nations Security Council resolution 1471, adopted unanimously on 28 March 2003, after reaffirming all resolutions on the situation in Afghanistan, the Council extended the mandate of the United Nations Assistance Mission in Afghanistan (UNAMA) for an additional period of twelve months until 28 March 2004.

The Security Council reaffirmed its commitment to the sovereignty, territorial integrity, independence and unity of Afghanistan and recognised the Transitional Administration as the legitimate government until planned elections in 2004. It also endorsed the agreement of the "Kabul Declaration on Good Neighbourly Relations" (as with Resolution 1453 in 2002) and stressed the central role of the United Nations in assisting the Afghan people in rebuilding their country.

The resolution endorsed the establishment of an electoral unit within UNAMA. If further stressed that the provision of recovery and reconstruction through the Transitional Administration could contribute to the implementation of the Bonn Agreement, and gave support to the Special Representative of the Secretary-General for Afghanistan, Lakhdar Brahimi. UNAMA was required to provide assistance to the Afghan Independent Human Rights Commission and all Afghan parties were urged to co-operate with the mission in the implementation of its mandate and ensure the safety of its staff. The International Security Assistance Force (ISAF) was also required to co-operate with Brahimi and the Secretary-General while implementing its mandate in accordance with Resolution 1444 (2002).

Finally, the Secretary-General Kofi Annan was instructed to report every four months on the implementation of the current resolution.

== See also ==
- Afghanistan conflict (1978–present)
- List of United Nations Security Council Resolutions 1401 to 1500 (2002–2003)
- War in Afghanistan (2001–2021)
