= 1955 riots at the Pakistani embassy and consulates in Afghanistan =

Part of the Afghanistan–Pakistan border conflict

- Part of the Afghanistan–Pakistan border conflict
- Location: Kingdom of Afghanistan
- Date: 31 October 1955; 71 years ago
- Target: Embassy of Pakistan, Kabul; Consulates of Pakistan, Jalalabad and Kandahar
- Attack type: Riot, arson
- Motive: Creation of the One Unit Scheme by the Dominion of Pakistan and Afghanistan's non-recognition of the Durand Line

On 31 October 1955, a large crowd of Afghan rioters attacked the Pakistani embassy in Kabul and the Pakistani consulates in Jalalabad and Kandahar after being angered by the Pakistani government's amalgamation of the North-West Frontier Province (and the Federally Administered Tribal Areas) into West Pakistan, which was created by the One Unit Scheme.

Tensions between Afghanistan and Pakistan had existed since the latter was created through the partition of India in August 1947, as Afghanistan refused to recognize the legitimacy of the Durand Line, which Pakistan recognized as the international border between the two countries; Pakistan's modern-day Khyber Pakhtunkhwa is perceived by many as an integral part of the Pashtun homeland, and was therefore contested by Afghanistan for much of the 20th century. The Afghan government itself castigated Pakistan's One Unit Scheme, prompting Pakistan to terminate diplomatic ties with the country.

== Background ==
=== Afghanistan–Pakistan relations ===
The relations between Pakistan and Afghanistan were strained since Pakistan gained its independence from United Kingdom with the partition of British India in August 1947. After the partition, the Kingdom of Afghanistan was the only nation to vote against the Dominion of Pakistan's admittance as a recognized sovereign state to the UN. Following Pakistan's independence, Afghanistan sent operatives to operate in the country's northwest, giving away a substantial sum of money, weapons, and transistor radios to try and win over the local populous of Pakistanis to Afghanistan.

==== Durand Line dispute ====
Moreover, Afghanistan did not recognize the Durand Line, which is the Afghanistan–Pakistan border and which Pakistan inherited after the partition of India. Relations between the two countries worsened, and Afghanistan started funding proxies and initiating regular skirmishes with Pakistan along the border.

The two states' relations drastically worsened in 1951, when Afghan national Said Akbar Babrak assassinated the then Prime Minister of Pakistan, Liaquat Ali Khan, in Rawalpindi during a public rally.

== Events ==
On 30 March 1955, a pro-Pashtunistan group attacked the embassy and the ambassador's residence. They also tore down the Pakistani flag, to protest against the unification of the Pashtun-dominated North-West Frontier Province into West Pakistan as part of the One Unit policy. The protestors were stirred up by the Afghan Prime Minister Mohammed Daoud Khan and bussed to the site. The Afghan police did not intervene.

The following day, Pakistan's consulates in Kandahar and Jalalabad were also assaulted.

== Aftermath ==
=== Pakistani anti-Afghan riots ===
Pakistanis in Peshawar reacted by attacking the Afghan consulate in the city. The Pakistani police intervened, and the Pakistani government blamed Afghan dissidents and severed diplomatic relations. Afghanistan issued an order for the general mobilization of its soldiers and declared a state of emergency on May 6, 1955. Both the Afghan consulate in Pakistan and the Pakistani consulate in Afghanistan were already closed.

=== Bilateral negotiations ===
Mediation was proposed in response to the escalation of hostilities by the Americans, British, Egyptians, Iraqis, Turks, and Saudis. Afghanistan favored Saudi Arabia in a leading role, and mediation was accepted by both nations; Pakistan insisted during the meeting that it would not discuss Pakhtoonistan.

Afghanistan also consented to not pursue it. It was declared on May 17. King Saud's uncle, Prince Abdul Rahman, visited Karachi (Pakistan's erstwhile capital city) and Kabul and held meetings with the two governments. He was successful in getting Afghanistan to concede to Pakistan's primary requests, though the Afghan delegation continued to promote a Pakhtoonistan-oriented foreign policy towards Pakistan. Bilateral relations were not restored until 1957.

== See also ==
- Afghanistan–Pakistan border skirmishes
  - Assassination of Liaquat Ali Khan (1951)
  - Bajaur Campaign (1960–1961)
  - Waziristan rebellion (1948-1954)
  - Waziristan campaign (1936–1939)
  - Pashtunistan
  - Bannu Resolution
