= List of ambassadors of Afghanistan to Pakistan =

Ambassador of Afghanistan to Pakistan
- Flag of Afghanistan
- Incumbent; Sardar Ahmed Khan Shakeeb (charge d'affaires) since October 2021
- Afghan Ministry of Foreign Affairs
- Style: His Excellency
- Residence: Islamabad, Pakistan
- Seat: Embassy of Afghanistan
- Appointer: Foreign Minister
- Term length: No fixed term
- Formation: 1947
- First holder: Sardar Najibullah Khan
- Website: islamabad.mfa.gov.af

The Afghan ambassador to Pakistan is the top-level diplomatic representative of Afghanistan in Pakistan. The ambassador is in charge of the Afghan embassy in Islamabad. It is politically an important Afghan diplomatic post, due to the Afghan–Pakistani bilateral relations, both countries being neighbours and Pakistan facilitating overland transit trade for a landlocked Afghanistan.

== List of ambassadors ==
- Sardar Najibullah Khan (December 1947 – 1948) (Note: Appointed as the special representative of the Afghan King to the Dominion of Pakistan.)
- Sardar Shah Wali Khan (1948–1949)
- Sardar Atiq Khan (1952 – c. 1955)
- Abdul Zahir (1958–1961)

Diplomatic relations were terminated on 6 September 1961 and restored on 28 May 1963.

- Mohammad Hashim Maiwandwal (1963–1964)
- Mohammad Nur Ahmad Etemadi (1964–1965)
- Ali Ahmad Popal (28 June 1969 – c. 1973)
- Mohammad Nur Ahmad Etemadi (1976–1978) (Note: Etemadi served two non-consecutive terms as ambassador to Pakistan.)
- Abdul Rashid Arian (1978-1980)
- Mahmoud Baryalai (1978- 1979)
- Mohammad Siddiq Saljouki (c. 1992)
- Masoud Khalili (1995)
- Abdul Hakeem Mujahid (1998)
- Mullah Mohammad Said-ur-Rehman Haqqani (1998–2000)
- Mullah Abdul Salam Zaeef (2000–2001)
- Nanguyalai Tarzi (2002–2007)
- Mohammad Anwar Anwarzai (31 July 2007 – 4 September 2008)
- Majnoon Gulab (acting) (2008–2011) (Note: Gulab was the Afghan chargé d'affaires in Islamabad. In September 2008, Afghanistan's ambassador-designate to Pakistan Abdul Khaliq Farahi was abducted by armed gunmen in Peshawar and held in captivity until 13 November 2010. Due to his absence, Gulab took over as acting ambassador and held the position until Daudzai's appointment as ambassador in 2011.)
- Mohammad Omar Daudzai (April 2011 – August 2013)
- Janan Mosazai (November 2013 – January 2016)
- Omar Zakhilwal (February 2016 – November 2018)
- Atif Mashal (November 2018 – July 2020)
- Najibullah Alikhel (September 2020 – October 2021)
- Sardar Ahmed Khan Shakeeb (chargé d'affaires; 29 October 2021 – present)

== See also ==
- List of ambassadors of Afghanistan
- List of ambassadors of Pakistan to Afghanistan
