= Shultan District =

Afghanistan District

Shultan District (Pashto: شلتن ولسوالي) is a district in Kunar Province, Afghanistan.

The Kunar River separates Shaigal District from Shultan and both districts are connected by the Shultan bridge.

== History ==
On 16 April 2022, Pakistani airstrikes and rocket attacks targeted the Chogam village of Shultan District, killing three girls, two boys, and one woman, and wounding one man.
