= Embassy of Afghanistan, Islamabad =

Embassy of Afghanistan in Islamabad
- Location: House No. 8, Street 90, G-6/3; Islamabad, Pakistan
- Coordinates: 33.72518414652325°N 73.08933486002593°E
- Chargé d'affaires: Muhammad Shokaib
- Website: islamabad.mfa.gov.af

The Embassy of Afghanistan in Islamabad (Note: Pashto: د افغانستان اسلامي امارت لوی سفارت په اسلام آباد کې; Dari: سفارت کبرای امارت اسلامی افغانستان در اسلام آباد; Urdu: افغانستان سفارتخانہ، اسلام آباد) is the diplomatic mission of the Islamic Emirate of Afghanistan to the Islamic Republic of Pakistan.

As of 2017 a new embassy was being constructed in the Diplomatic Enclave of Islamabad, to become Afghanistan's largest embassy abroad. The last Afghan ambassador to Pakistan before the fall of the Islamic Republic to the Taliban was Najibullah Alikhel. In July 2021, Afghanistan recalled its diplomats over allegations by Alikhel's daughter Silsila that she had been kidnapped and beaten, which Pakistan denied. In October 2021, despite not recognizing the post-August 2021 Taliban rule, Pakistan allowed the Taliban to assign diplomats to the embassy as well as the Afghan consulates in Karachi, Peshawar, and Quetta.

== See also ==
- List of ambassadors of Afghanistan to Pakistan
- List of diplomatic missions of Afghanistan
- List of diplomatic missions in Pakistan
- Afghanistan-Pakistan relations
- Embassy of Pakistan, Kabul
