= Rustam Shah Mohmand =

Pakistani diplomat and commissioner for Afghan refugees (1942–2024)

Interior Secretary of Pakistan
- In office June 1999 – October 12, 1999
- Prime Minister: Nawaz Sharif

Chief Secretary of the North-West Frontier Province
- In office March 1997 – August 1998

Chief Commissioner for Afghan Refugees
- In office 1987–1989

Personal details
- Born: 15 August 1942 Dhakki, Charsadda District, North-West Frontier Province, British India
- Died: 27 December 2024 (aged 82)

Rustam Shah Mohmand (15 August 1942 – 27 December 2024) was a senior Pakistani diplomat and political scientist.

== Background ==
Rustam Shāh Mohmand ancestrally hailed from the Musa Khēl (Qasim Kor) sub-branch of the Mohmand district. He studied civil engineering at Peshawar's College of Engineering and Technology (now University of Engineering and Technology, Peshawar) and King's College London. He graduated with a degree in the humanities from the University of Peshawar and then joined the civil service of Pakistan.

== Diplomat ==
Mohmand specialised in FATA and refugee affairs. He served as Chief Secretary NWFP, Interior Secretary of Pakistan, Pakistan's Ambassador to Afghanistan and Commissioner for Afghan Refugees. Mohmand also served as a Political Agent in the Khyber and South Waziristan Agencies.

As part of his work in South Waziristan, Mohmand helped rebuild the main bazaar in Wana, the winter capital, which was later named "Rustam bazar" by the local maliks (or tribal chiefs) to honour him. From 1987 to 1989, he worked as Chief Commissioner for Afghan Refugees. He was recently a leader of Pakistan Tehreek-e-Insaf and a member of the Khyber Pakhtunkhwa Advisory committee (headed by Imran Khan), which advises the provincial government on development and planning.

In the late 1990s, Rustam Shah had mediated with Mullah Omar to meet with Northern Alliance leader Ahmad Shah Massoud for a power sharing agreement in Central Asia. Rustam Shah described Mullah Omar Hotak as "a very simple fellow, a man of few words, but very straight-forward and very clearheaded".

Mohmand died on 27 December 2024, at the age of 82.

== See also ==
- Imran Khan
- 2003 attack on the Embassy of Pakistan in Kabul
