= Mufti Yousuf =

Pakistani Taliban member

Mufti Yousuf مفتی یوسف
- Occupation: Taliban member

Mufti Yousuf is a citizen of Pakistan and an alleged Taliban leader and spokesman.

On 15 October, 2001 Mufti Yousuf was accompanying international journalists in Jalalabad. The Associated Press quoted his response to reports of an aerial bombardment aimed at Osama bin Laden's underground headquarters in nearby Tora Bora:

The Taliban just laugh at these bombs. It is nothing. It makes no difference.

Pakistan's Ambassador to Afghanistan was captured on 11 February 2008. When he was set free on 16 May 2008 Pakistani authorities denied that his release was due to a negotiated prisoner swap.

Nevertheless, the BBC, the Pak Tribune, and the Asia Times all reported there had been a prisoner swap. The Asia Times reported that 55 militants were released and named Mufti Yousuf and Muslim Dost as two of the most senior swapped captives.
