= United Nations Security Council Resolution 1589 =

UN Security Council Resolution 1589
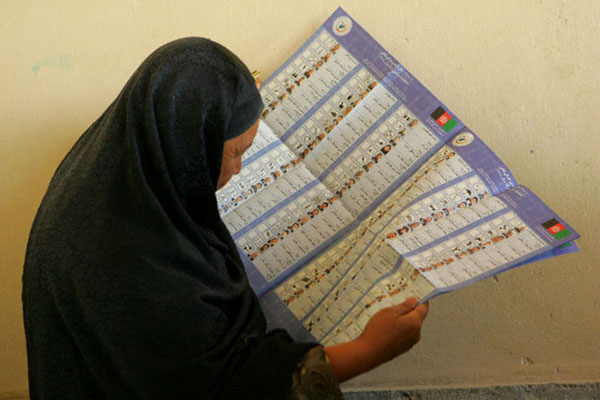
- Afghan woman during parliamentary elections (2005)
- Date: 24 March 2005
- Meeting no.: 5,148
- Code: S/RES/1589 (Document)
- Subject: The situation in Afghanistan
- Voting summary: 15 voted for; None voted against; None abstained
- Result: Adopted

Security Council composition
- Permanent members: China; France; Russia; United Kingdom; United States
- Non-permanent members: Algeria; Argentina; Benin; Brazil; Denmark; Greece; Japan; Philippines; Romania; Tanzania

United Nations Security Council resolution 1589, adopted unanimously on 24 March 2005, after reaffirming all resolutions on the situation in Afghanistan, particularly Resolution 1536 (2004), the council extended the mandate of the United Nations Assistance Mission in Afghanistan (UNAMA) for an additional period of twelve months until 24 March 2006.

== Resolution ==
=== Observations ===
The security council reaffirmed its commitment to the sovereignty, territorial integrity, independence and unity of Afghanistan and welcomed the holding of a presidential election in October 2004. It stressed the need to tackle challenges in the country, including narcotics, terrorism, the lack of security, reform and development, human rights, nationwide disarmament programmes and illegal armed groups. The council also reaffirmed its support for the 2001 Bonn Agreement, Berlin Declaration and Kabul Declaration on Good-Neighborly Relations.

=== Acts ===
The security council renewed the mandate of UNAMA for an additional twelve months from the date of the adoption of the current resolution. The Afghan authorities were urged to put in place a representative electoral process, while stressing the importance of upcoming elections which required further contributions to the International Security Assistance Force (ISAF).

The resolution welcomed progress in setting up the new Afghan Parliament, progress in the disarmament, demobilisation and reintegration programme and a national drug control strategy. Meanwhile, efforts to combat the illegal drug trade by the Afghan authorities were welcomed by the council. UNAMA was required to continue supporting the development of a transparent and fair justice system.

The security council called for respect of human rights and international humanitarian law throughout Afghanistan, calling on UNAMA to assist in the implementation of human rights aspects of the Afghan constitution. Furthermore, the development of the Afghan National Army and Afghan National Police was welcomed by council members, while ISAF, including Operation Enduring Freedom, was asked to address the threat of terrorism, factional violence and criminal activities in the country.

Finally, the Secretary-General Kofi Annan was directed to report regularly on the situation in Afghanistan and the future role of UNAMA.

== See also ==
- War in Afghanistan (1978–present)
- List of United Nations Security Council Resolutions 1501 to 1600 (2003–2005)
- War in Afghanistan (2001–present)
