= Tariq Azizuddin =

Pakistani diplomat

Tariq Azizuddin was Pakistan's ambassador to Turkey. He was ambassador to Afghanistan when he was taken hostage by terrorists from the Tehrik-i-Taliban on Monday February 11, 2008. Tariq was traveling, by road, from his home in Peshawar, to Afghanistan's nearby capital, Kabul. His vehicle was stopped by gunmen and he was taken hostage along with his driver Gul Nawaz and bodyguard Amir Sultan in Pakistan's Khyber Tribal Agency, prior to passing through the border crossing at Torkham.

The Taliban released a video to the Arab satellite channel al-Arabiya TV on April 19, 2008.

On May 16, 2008 his brother Tahir Azizuddin announced that Tariq was safe and had been freed. Nawaz and Sultan were also freed. Pakistani authorities denied that Tariq's release was the culmination of a negotiated deal. Nevertheless, the BBC, the Pak Tribune, and the Asia Times all reported there had been a prisoner swap.

The Asia Times article asserted there was a deal—with Baitullah Mehsud. The Asia Times article stated that 55 militants were released, and that a payment of 20 million Pakistani Rupees was paid. The Asia Times article named Mufti Yousuf and Muslim Dost as two of released militants The Asia Times article reported that Maulana Abdul Aziz was expected to be released soon. The Asia Times article reported that negotiations stalled over the kidnappers demand that Mullah Obaidullah be handed over, and the 20 million rupee payment was in lieu of his release.
