= United Nations Security Council Resolution 1510 =

UN Security Council Resolution 1510
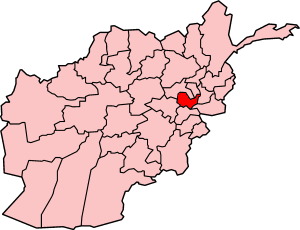
- Kabul Province in Afghanistan
- Date: 13 October 2003
- Meeting no.: 4,840
- Code: S/RES/1510 (Document)
- Subject: The situation in Afghanistan
- Voting summary: 15 voted for; None voted against; None abstained
- Result: Adopted

Security Council composition
- Permanent members: China; France; Russia; United Kingdom; United States
- Non-permanent members: Angola; Bulgaria; Chile; Cameroon; Germany; Guinea; Mexico; Pakistan; Spain; Syria

United Nations Security Council resolution 1510, adopted unanimously on 13 October 2003, after reaffirming all resolutions on the situation in Afghanistan, particularly resolutions 1386 (2001), 1413 (2002) and 1444 (2002), and resolutions 1368 (2001) and 1373 (2001) on terrorism, the council extended the authorisation of the International Security Assistance Force (ISAF) for a period of one year and expanded its operations outside the capital Kabul to other areas.

The adoption of Resolution 1510 was welcomed by the Afghan government, which had long demanded that ISAF be expanded to reassert government control over the country.

== Resolution ==
=== Observations ===
The Security Council recognised that the responsibility for providing security and law and order throughout Afghanistan resided with Afghans themselves. It recalled the Bonn Agreement and its provision for the progressive expansion of ISAF to other areas beyond Kabul. The council also stressed the importance of the expansion of central government authority, security sector reform and comprehensive disarmament, demobilisation and reintegration of all armed forces. There were concerns that the Bonn Agreement could not be fully implemented due to the security situation in parts of the country.

Determining the situation to be a threat to international peace and security, the preamble of the resolution recorded a letter from the Afghan Foreign Minister requesting ISAF assistance outside the capital and from NATO requesting an expansion of the force.

=== Acts ===
Acting under Chapter VII of the United Nations Charter, the council expanded the mandate of ISAF to support the Afghan Transitional Administration and its successors to provide a secure environment. ISAF was asked to work with the Transitional Administration and its successors, the Special Representative of the Secretary-General and Operation Enduring Freedom.

At the same time, ISAF's mandate, which was due to expire on 20 December 2003, was extended for an additional twelve months. States participating in the force were authorised to use all necessary measures to fulfil the mandate. Finally, the ISAF leadership was requested to provide quarterly reports on the implementation of its mandate.

== See also ==
- War in Afghanistan (1978–present)
- List of United Nations Security Council Resolutions 1501 to 1600 (2003–2005)
- United Nations Assistance Mission in Afghanistan
- War in Afghanistan (2001–present)
