= United Nations Security Council Resolution 1662 =

UN Security Council Resolution 1662
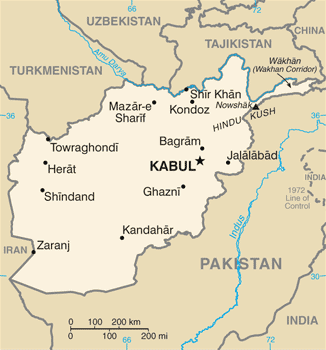
- Afghanistan
- Date: 23 March 2006
- Meeting no.: 5,393
- Code: S/RES/1662 (Document)
- Subject: The situation in Afghanistan
- Voting summary: 15 voted for; None voted against; None abstained
- Result: Adopted

Security Council composition
- Permanent members: China; France; Russia; United Kingdom; United States
- Non-permanent members: Argentina; Rep. of the Congo; Denmark; Ghana; Greece; Japan; Peru; Qatar; Slovakia; Tanzania

United Nations Security Council Resolution 1662, adopted unanimously on March 23, 2006, after reaffirming all resolutions on the situation in Afghanistan, including resolutions 1589 (2005) and 1659 (2006), the Council extended the mandate of the United Nations Assistance Mission in Afghanistan (UNAMA) for an additional period of twelve months.

== Resolution ==
=== Observations ===
The Security Council reaffirmed its commitment to the sovereignty, territorial integrity, independence and unity of Afghanistan and welcomed the implementation of the "Afghanistan Compact". It offered support to the country as it built upon the completion of the Bonn Process and welcomed elections held in September 2005.

Meanwhile, the resolution recognised the interconnected nature of the problems in Afghanistan and stressed the mutually reinforcing issues of progress relating to security, governance and development. It was also important to combat narcotic and terrorist threats posed by the Taliban, Al-Qaeda and other groups.

The preamble of the resolution expressed concern at the threats posed by extremist activities. It also reaffirmed the role of the United Nations in Afghanistan and its support for the 2002 Kabul Declaration on Good-Neighbourly Relations.

=== Acts ===
The Security Council renewed the mandate of UNAMA for an additional twelve months from the date of the adoption of the current resolution. The Afghan authorities and international community were urged to implement the "Afghanistan Compact" fully and meet benchmarks.

The resolution welcomed progress with regard to the Afghan Police and Afghan Army, the auguration of a new Afghan Parliament, progress in the disarmament, demobilisation and reintegration programme and new strategies relating to justice reform and drugs control with relation to opium.

The Security Council called for respect of human rights and international humanitarian law throughout Afghanistan, calling on UNAMA and the United Nations High Commissioner for Refugees (UNHCR) to assist in the implementation of human rights aspects of the Afghan constitution.

Furthermore, Afghanistan was called upon to co-operate with UNAMA in the course of its mandate, ensuring its safety and freedom of movement. The International Security Assistance Force (ISAF), including Operation Enduring Freedom, were asked to address the threat of terrorism and extremism posed by Al-Qaeda, the Taliban and other groups in the country. At the same time, the promotion of confidence-building measures was urged between Afghanistan and neighbouring countries.

Finally, the Secretary-General Kofi Annan was directed to report every six months on the situation in Afghanistan.

== See also ==
- War in Afghanistan (1978–present)
- List of United Nations Security Council Resolutions 1601 to 1700 (2005–2006)
- War in Afghanistan (2001–present)
