= Afghanistan–Pakistan relations =

- Afghanistan: Pakistan

Diplomatic mission
- Embassy of Afghanistan, Islamabad: Embassy of Pakistan, Kabul

Envoy
- Charge d'Affaires Mohammad Shokaib: Ambassador Ubaid-ur-Rahman Nizamani

Afghanistan and Pakistan have maintained diplomatic relations since 1948. Following the independence of Dominion of Pakistan through the partition of British India in August 1947, the Kingdom of Afghanistan was the sole country to vote against Pakistan's admission into the United Nations, though withdrew from the negative vote days later in October 1947. However, the Afghan government under King Zahir Shah (r. 1933–1973) began providing support to Pashtun nationalist movements within Pakistan and, in 1952, published a tract laying claim to Pashtun-dominated regions of northwestern and southwestern Pakistan. This prevented normalised ties from emerging between the two states. The internationally recognized border between the two states, known as the Durand Line, was rejected by Pashtun-led governments in monarchist and later communist Afghanistan. In 1960, the Afghan military under Prime Minister Daoud Khan launched an unsuccessful invasion in Bajaur, Pakistan, in an effort to take some of the Pashtun-majority areas in Pakistan. It was only after Khan's ouster in 1963 when both countries re-established ties.

Pakistan supported the Afghan mujahideen in the Soviet–Afghan War (1979–1989) and the First Afghan Civil War (1989–1992). In the course of the Second Afghan Civil War (1992–1996), Pakistan aided the Hezb-e Islami Gulbuddin until 1994 when the Inter-Service Intelligence (ISI) played a major role in the creation and funding of the Taliban. Pakistan was one of the only three states to recognize the Taliban-led Islamic Emirate of Afghanistan (1996–2001) against the Northern Alliance-led internationally recognized Islamic State of Afghanistan. Following the overthrow of the Taliban in 2001, Pakistan and the Islamic Republic of Afghanistan maintained relatively cool relations; however, cross-border terrorism led to a number of border skirmishes. Pakistan voiced support for the Taliban takeover of Afghanistan in 2021 under Prime Minister Imran Khan.

Relations between the Taliban-led Islamic Emirate of Afghanistan and Pakistan have been volatile. The Pakistani Taliban (TTP) has been a flashpoint in deterioration of ties. Pakistan has accused the Islamic Emirate government in Afghanistan of having provided a safe haven for TTP terrorists that attack Pakistani territory, while the Islamic Emirate has denied any links between them and the TTP, insisting that it is Pakistan's internal issue. Since 2024, border skirmishes between the two countries have risen to an all-time high, escalating into a direct war in February 2026.

== Background ==
Southern and eastern Afghanistan is predominately Pashto-speaking, like the adjacent Khyber-Pakhtunkhwa, Federally Administered Tribal Areas, and northern Balochistan regions in Pakistan. This entire area is inhabited by the indigenous Pashtuns who belong to different Pashtun tribes. The Pashtuns have lived in this region for thousands of years, since at least the 1st millennium BC.

The Durand Line border was established after the 1893 Durand Line Agreement between Mortimer Durand of colonial British India and Emir Abdur Rahman Khan (r. 1880–1901) of Afghanistan for fixing the limit of their respective spheres of influence. The single-page agreement, which contained seven short articles, was signed by Durand and Khan, agreeing not to exercise political interference beyond the frontier line between Afghanistan and what was then the British Indian Empire.

Shortly after the demarcation of the Durand Line, the British began connecting the region on its side of Durand line to the vast and expansive Indian railway network. Concurrently, the Afridi tribesmen began to rise up in arms against the British, creating a zone of instability between Peshawar and the Durand Line. As a result, travel across the boundary was almost entirely halted, and the Pashtun tribes living under the British rule began to orient themselves eastward in the direction of the Indian railways. By the time of the Indian independence movement, prominent Pashtun nationalists such as Abdul Ghaffar Khan advocated unity with the nearly formed Dominion of India, and not a united Afghanistan – highlighting the extent to which infrastructure and instability began to erode the Pashtun self-identification with Afghanistan. By the time of the Pakistan independence movement, popular opinion among Pashtuns was in support of joining the Dominion of Pakistan. Following the independence of Pakistan in August 1947, the Kingdom of Afghanistan objected to it; however, withdrew its vote by October 1947 and both countries established close diplomatic relations in 1948.

Territorial disputes along the widely known "Durand Line" and conflicting claims prevented the normalization of bilateral ties between the countries throughout the mid-20th century. Afghan territorial claims over Pashtun-majority areas that are in Pakistan were coupled with discontent over the permanency of the Durand Line which has long been considered the international border by every nation other than Afghanistan, and for which Afghanistan demanded a renegotiation, with the aim of having it shifted eastward to the Indus River.

Various Afghan government officials and Pashtun nationalists have made irredentist claims to large swathes of Pakistan's territory in modern-day Khyber Pakhtunkhwa and Pakistani Balochistan, which complete the traditional homeland of "Pashtunistan" for the Pashtun people. Shortly after Pakistani independence, Afghanistan materially supported the failed armed secessionist movement headed by Mirza Ali Khan against Pakistan. Afghanistan's immediate support of secessionist movements within Pakistan prevented normalised ties from emerging between the two states. In 1952 the government of Afghanistan published a tract in which it laid claim not only to Pashtun territory within Pakistan, but also to the Pakistani province of Balochistan. On 30 March 1955, a pro-Pashtunistan group attacked the embassy and the ambassador's residence. They also tore down the Pakistani flag, to protest against the unification of the Pashtun-dominated North-West Frontier Province into West Pakistan as part of the One Unit policy. The protestors were stirred up by the Afghan Prime Minister Mohammed Daoud Khan and bussed to the site. The Afghan police did not intervene, Pakistanis in Peshawar reacted by attacking the Afghan consulate in the city following which the diplomatic relations were severed by Pakistan Diplomatic relations were cut off between 1961 and 1963 after Afghanistan supported more armed separatists in Pakistan, leading to skirmishes between the two states earlier in 1960, and Pakistan's subsequent closure of the port of Karachi to Afghan transit trade.

Mohammed Daoud Khan became President of Afghanistan in 1973. Afghanistan—with Soviet support—again pursued a policy of arming Pashtun separatists within Pakistan. During the 1980s, relations remained tense as the Durand Line was heavily used by Afghan refugees fleeing the Soviet occupation in Afghanistan, including a large number of Mujahideen insurgent groups who crossed back and forth. Pakistan became a major training ground for roughly 250,000 foreign mujahideen fighters who began crossing into Afghanistan on a daily basis to wage war against the communist Afghanistan and the Soviet forces. After the Soviet troops withdrew from Afghanistan, Pakistan-backed mujahideen factions eventually overthrew Najibullah's regime in the early 1990s.

== History ==
=== From the Afghan civil wars to the war on terror ===
Although the victorious mujahideen formed a government in 1992 through the Peshawar Accords, Pakistan remained unhappy with new leaders Rabbani and Massoud, including their foreign policy of maintaining friendly relations with India as during the communist era. Pushing for a "trusted" friendly government in Afghanistan, the Pakistani intelligence started funding Hekmatyar-the only mujahideen commander not to sign the Accords-to fight against the new Afghan government in hopes that he would win and install a new government. Through Pakistani funding, Hekmatyar's forces sieged Kabul city with thousands of rockets for three years, killing thousands. However, upon realizing that Hekmatyar was unable to take power in Kabul, Pakistan looked elsewhere.

Pakistan was heavily involved in creating and funding the Taliban in 1994. Pakistan saw the Taliban as a way to secure trade routes to Central Asia and establish a government in Kabul friendly to its interests. The role of the Pakistani military has been described by international observers as well as by the anti-Taliban leader Ahmad Shah Massoud as a "creeping invasion". Pakistani Interior Minister, Naseerullah Babar is said to threw weight behind the Taliban. Around September 1994, the Taliban movement captured the Afghan city of Kandahar and began its long conquest with help from Pakistan. The Taliban claimed that they wanted to clean Afghanistan from the warlords and criminals. According to Pakistan and Afghanistan expert Ahmed Rashid, "between 1994 and 1999, an estimated few Pakistanis volunteers trained and fought in Afghanistan" keeping the Taliban regime in power. The role of the Pakistani military during that time has been described by some international observers as a "creeping invasion" of Afghanistan. UN documents also reveal the role of Arab and Pakistani support troops in the Taliban massacre campaigns.

In late 1996, the Islamic Emirate of Afghanistan emerged and established close relations with neighbouring Pakistan. However, the relations began to decline when the Taliban refused to endorse the Durand Line despite pressure from Islamabad, arguing that there shall be no borders among Muslims. A discussion over the Durrand Line between the-then Taliban leader Mohammed Omar and Naseerullah Babar ended abruptly. Omar called Babar, who was an ethnic Pashtun, a traitor for saying that "all problems would be resolved" should the Durrand Line be recognised by the Taliban government.

When the Islamic Emirate of Afghanistan was toppled and the new Islamic Republic of Afghanistan government was formed, President Hamid Karzai stated:

"A line of hatred that raised a wall between the two brothers."

— Hamid Karzai

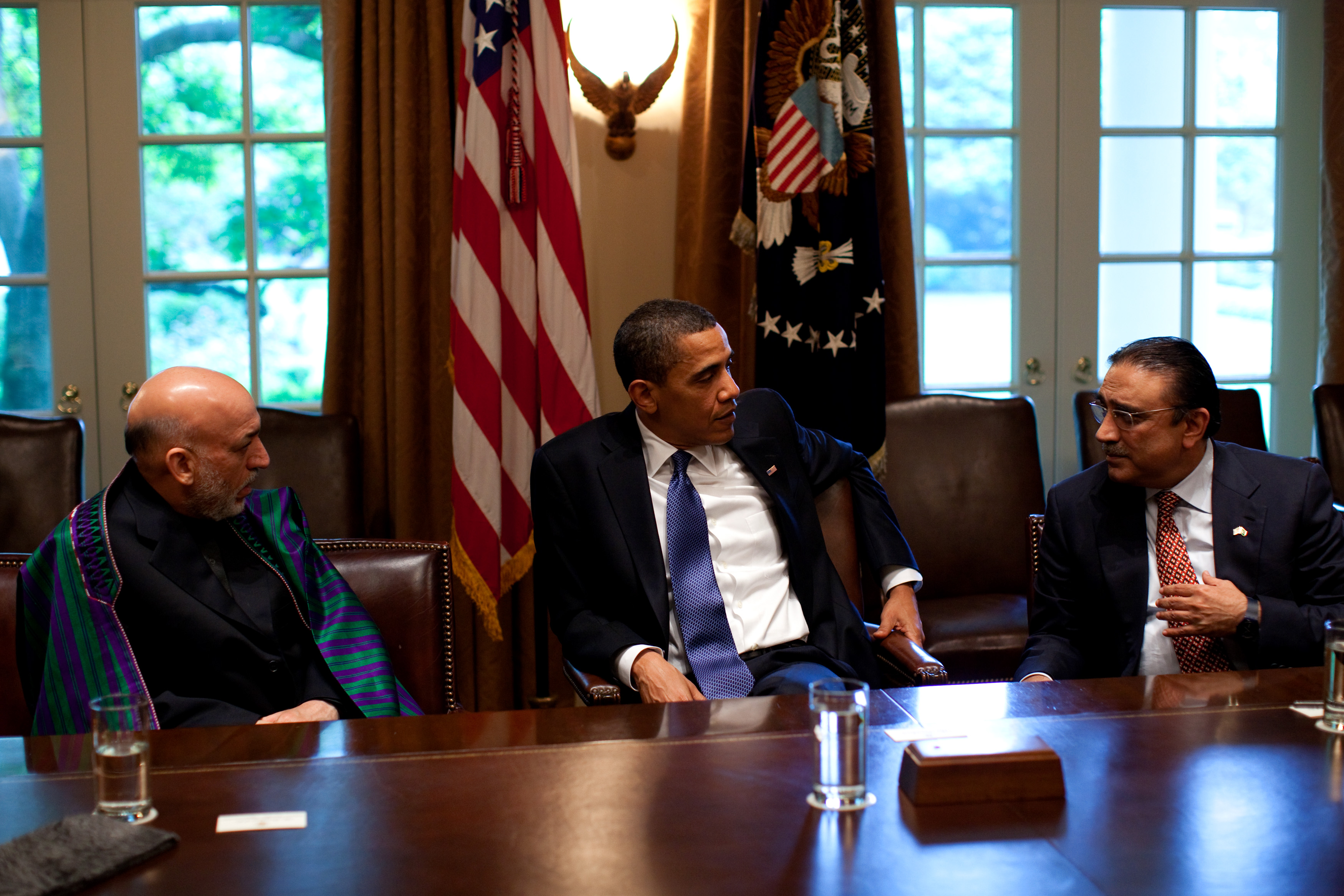
Afghan President Hamid Karzai with U.S. President Barack Obama and Pakistani President Asif Ali Zardari during a US-Afghan-Pakistan Trilateral meeting at the White House in Washington, DC.

The Karzai administration in Afghanistan has close relations with the Pashtun nationalist Awami National Party (ANP) and the Pakistan Peoples Party (PPP). In 2006, Afghan president Hamid Karzai warned that "Iran and Pakistan and others are not fooling anyone" when it comes to interfering in his country.

"If they don’t stop, the consequences will be … that the region will suffer with us equally. In the past we have suffered alone; this time everybody will suffer with us.… Any effort to divide Afghanistan ethnically or weaken it will create the same thing in the neighboring countries. All the countries in the neighborhood have the same ethnic groups that we have, so they should know that it is a different ball game this time."

— Hamid Karzai

The Durand Line border has been used in the last decade as the main supply route for NATO-led forces in Afghanistan as well as by Taliban insurgents and other militant groups who stage attacks inside Afghanistan. The American government decided to rely on drone attacks, which began to negatively affect the US-Pakistan relations.

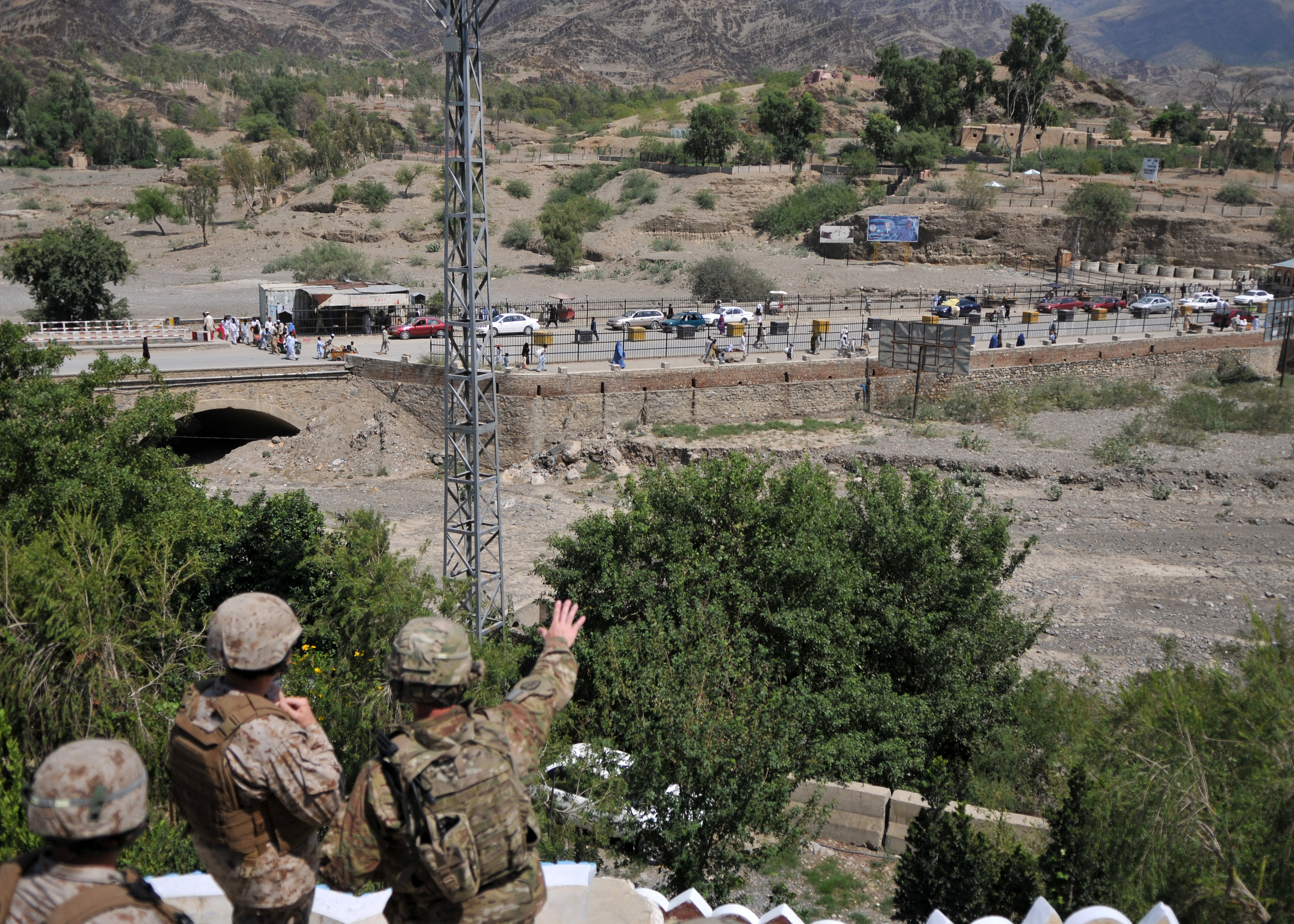
U.S. Armed Forces checking the border checkpoint at Torkham, between Nangarhar Province of Afghanistan and Khyber Pakhtunkhwa in Pakistan.

In 2007, Afghan intelligence captured Muhammad Hanif, the Taliban spokesman. During his interrogation which was recorded, Hanif claimed that the Taliban leader was being kept in Quetta under the protection of the ISI. Pakistan denied the claims.

Relations have become more strained after the Afghan government began openly accusing Pakistan of using its ISI spy network in aiding the Taliban and other militants. Pakistan usually denies these allegations but has said in the past that it does not have full control of the actions of the ISI. There have been a number of reports about the Afghanistan–Pakistan skirmishes, which usually occur when army soldiers are in hot pursuit chasing insurgents who cross the border back and forth. This leads to tensions between the two states, especially after hearing reports of civilian casualties.

After the May 2011 death of Osama bin Laden in Pakistan, many prominent Afghan figures began being assassinated, including Mohammed Daud Daud, Ahmad Wali Karzai, Jan Mohammad Khan, Ghulam Haider Hamidi, Burhanuddin Rabbani and others. Also in the same year, the Afghanistan–Pakistan skirmishes intensified and many large scale attacks by the Haqqani network took place across Afghanistan. This led to the United States warning Pakistan of a possible military action against the Haqqanis in the Federally Administered Tribal Areas. The U.S. blamed Pakistan's government, mainly Pakistani Army and its ISI spy network as the masterminds behind all of this.

"In choosing to use violent extremism as an instrument of policy, the government of Pakistan, and most especially the Pakistani army and ISI, jeopardizes not only the prospect of our strategic partnership but Pakistan's opportunity to be a respected nation with legitimate regional influence. They may believe that by using these proxies, they are hedging their bets or redressing what they feel is an imbalance in regional power. But in reality, they have already lost that bet."

— Admiral Mike Mullen, Chairman of the Joint Chiefs of Staff

U.S. Ambassador to Pakistan, Cameron Munter, told Radio Pakistan that "the attack that took place in Kabul a few days ago, that was the work of the Haqqani network. There is evidence linking the Haqqani Network to the Pakistan government. This is something that must stop." Other top U.S. officials such as Hillary Clinton and Leon Panetta made similar statements. Despite all of this, Afghan President Hamid Karzai labelled Pakistan as Afghanistan's "twin brother".

After the May 2017 Kabul attack, the Afghan National Directorate of Security (NDS) claimed that the blast was planned by the Afghan insurgent group Haqqani Network, and reiterated allegations that those elements had support and presence across the border in Pakistan. Afghan President Ashraf Ghani stated that Pakistan has instigated an "undeclared war of aggression" against the country. Pakistan's Foreign Ministry spokesman, Nafees Zakaria rejected the Afghan allegations as "baseless".

Since the Taliban's inception, the Pakistani Inter-Services Intelligence (ISI) agency has been providing them with funding, training, and weaponry. In 2017, the Pakistani military have accused Afghanistan of sheltering various terrorist groups which launch attacks into Pakistan, while Afghan authorities have blamed Pakistan's intelligence agency, the ISI, for funding warlords and the Taliban, and for basing terrorist camps within Pakistani territory to target Afghanistan.

In 2015, Inter-Services Intelligence and National Directorate of Security inked a memorandum of understanding. Under the memorandum of understanding, both nations agreed to fight terrorism together and also to share intelligence information. On 16 May 2015, the Pakistani army launched an operation to save the life of an injured Afghan soldier on the Afghanistan side of the border. The soldier was injured in a clash with militants and he was evacuated by the Pakistan military. There have been instances where Afghan soldiers injured in fighting the militants near the Pakistan Afghanistan border are sent to Pakistan for treatment.

In January 2018, Khawaja Asif, the then foreign minister of Pakistan, claimed that US had carried out about 57,800 attacks on Afghanistan from Pakistani bases.

=== Contemporary era after the Taliban regains power ===
After the Taliban took power in Kabul, Pakistani prime minister Imran Khan described it as Afghans breaking "the shackles of slavery". Few days later, Pakistan's DG ISI Faiz Hameed met senior Taliban leadership in Kabul and mediated among different factions of the Taliban in their process of appointments for key ministerial positions. Although Pakistan still does not officially recognize the Taliban's Islamic Emirate, it launched a diplomatic effort urging the international community to engage with the Taliban, help ease Afghanistan's humanitarian crisis and prevent it from descending into chaos again. In December 2021, foreign ministers of the 56 nations belonging to the Organization of Islamic Cooperation, along with Taliban delegates, gathered in Islamabad. The meeting focused on Afghanistan's humanitarian crisis.

The Tehreek-e-Taliban Pakistan (TTP) has been a flashpoint in Afghanistan–Pakistan relations. Pakistan has accused the Islamic Emirate government in Afghanistan to have provided sanctuary and safe havens to Pakistani Taliban terrorists to attack Pakistani territory. The Islamic Emirate rejects the accusation, insisting that it is Pakistan's internal affair. Several Afghan Taliban figures and Islamic scholars have issued fatwas ("religious verdicts") against the TTP and forbidding Afghans from joining any group that conducts terrorist attacks in Pakistan. The Afghan Taliban has also attempted to meditate between Pakistan and the TTP; however, most talks have been unsuccessful.

Following the ouster of Imran Khan in April 2022, Pakistan Air Force conducted air raids across its border with Afghanistan, claiming to strike TTP militants operating in the porous border regions. Islamabad urged Kabul "to secure Pak-Afghan Border region and take stern actions against the individuals involved in terrorist activities in Pakistan". In late 2022, Pakistan's embassy in Kabul came under attack with gunfire wounding a Pakistani security guard, IS-K claimed responsibility for the attack, Pakistan asked the attack to be thoroughly probed by the Taliban authorities. Pakistan's defence minister Khawaja Asif claimed that during an official visit to Afghanistan in 2022, Pakistani officials, including the Director General of the ISI, warned Afghan authorities about "terrorist sanctuaries" being used to launch attacks into Pakistan. He alleged that Afghan interlocutors had offered to relocate these sanctuaries in exchange for PKR 10 billion, but Islamabad requested assurances that militants would not return—assurances that he claimed Afghanistan was unable to provide. Hamidullah Fetrat, deputy spokesperson for the caretaker government, denied Asif's claim that Afghanistan requested money.

Following the June 2022 Afghanistan earthquake, Pakistan sent trucks carrying relief materials for earthquake victims in Afghanistan.

On 6 September 2023, two military posts located close to the Afghanistan border in Chitral district's area of Kalash were attacked by Pakistani Taliban (TTP) in which two Pakistani soldiers and twelve militants were killed. Pakistan claimed that TTP militants crossed the Afghan border to attack those posts within Pakistan. A firing incident occurred near Torkham border crossing resulted in closure of the border. Pakistan claimed that Afghanistan is building unlawful structures on the border which violates Pakistan's territorial sovereignty. On October 6, 2023, Pakistan announced the deportation of 1.7 million undocumented Afghan immigrants. A deadline of Nov.1 was announced for people to leave or face forcible expulsion. Around 1.3 million Afghans are registered refugees in Pakistan and 880,000 more have legal status to remain, according to the latest United Nations figures. On November 10, 2023, Pakistan announced that it has extended the legal residence status of registered Afghan refugees till 31 December 2023, who have Proof of Registration, or PoR, cards issued by the Government of Pakistan.

In July 2024, Khawaja Asif confirmed in an interview with the BBC that the country had been carrying out, and would continue to carry out, cross-border strikes in Afghanistan against militant groups, dismissing concerns over their legality and asserting there was no need to inform the Taliban in advance—comments the Taliban condemned as "irresponsible," warning that such actions would have "consequences."

On 24 December 2024, Taliban authorities accused Pakistan of carrying out airstrikes in eastern Afghanistan that killed several civilians, including women and children. The Taliban's Ministry of National Defense condemned the late-night attack in Barmal, claiming in a statement on X that the victims were Pakistani refugee families residing in the area. The ministry stated, "The Islamic Emirate considers this brutal bombing a violation of international principles and a clear act of aggression," and warned that "this cowardly attack will not go unanswered." The statement came hours after anonymous Pakistani security officials reportedly confirmed the airstrikes. On 25 December, a Taliban government official said the strikes had killed 46 people, most of them women and children. Hamdullah Fitrat, deputy spokesman for the Afghan government, stated that the attacks targeted four separate locations in Barmal and that the victims were refugees. On 28 December 2024, Afghanistan reportedly launched retaliatory strikes on Pakistan. According to the Taliban Defense Ministry, the targeted sites served as "centers and hideouts for malicious elements and their supporters who organized and coordinated attacks in Afghanistan." A pro-Taliban media outlet, Hurriyet Daily News, claimed that the strikes killed 19 Pakistani troops and three Afghan civilians. Following the strikes, people in Afghanistan's southeastern Khost province reportedly held celebrations, expressing support for the Afghan military and chanting anti-Pakistan slogans.

The Torkham border crossing between Pakistan and Afghanistan was shut on 21 February 2025 due to a dispute over Afghan border post construction, disrupting trade and travel. Over 5,000 trucks carrying goods remained stranded, causing financial losses. Drivers and travelers, including women and children, were stuck in harsh winter conditions, with many forced to sleep in vehicles or in the open. Afghan officials blamed Pakistan for the unilateral closure, while Pakistan had not issued an immediate statement.

On 28 February 2025, a suicide bombing at the Darul Uloom Haqqania seminary in Akora Khattak, Khyber Pakhtunkhwa, killed at least six people, including religious scholar Hamid-ul-Haq, and injured 20 others. The attack occurred after Friday prayers, with police confirming a suicide bomber as the perpetrator. Hamid-ul-Haq, leader of the Jamiat Ulema Islam-Sami party, was the son of Sami-ul-Haq, known as the “Father of the Taliban.” The seminary, historically linked to the Afghan Taliban, has educated several of its leaders. Though no group has claimed responsibility, analysts suspect Islamic State’s Khorasan Province, which opposes the Afghan Taliban. Security expert Ihsanullah Tipu noted the attack’s ideological implications, as ISKP follows the Salafist school, while the Afghan Taliban adheres to Deoband teachings.

On 14 March 2025, Pakistan Military's Director General ISPR Lieutenant General Ahmed Sharif Chaudhry stated that the insurgents involved in the Jaffar Express Hijacking were supported by "handlers in Afghanistan." The Ministry of Foreign Affairs of Pakistan reiterated the claim, alleging that facilitators based in Afghanistan were involved in organizing the operation. However, Afghanistan had already rejected the claims made by Pakistan. Afghan Foreign Ministry spokesperson Abdul Qahar Balkhi, in a statement posted on X, rejected the Pakistani military's allegations linking Afghanistan to the passenger train attack in Balochistan, describing the claims as "baseless".

In October 2025, during Afghan Acting Foreign Minister Amir Khan Muttaqi’s official visit to India, a joint Afghanistan-India statement affirming support for India's territorial integrity and referencing Jammu and Kashmir prompted strong condemnation from Pakistan’s Ministry of Foreign Affairs. Pakistan also summoned the Afghan ambassador to Pakistan to protest against the statement in which both India and Afghanistan mentioned unequivocally condemnation of all acts of terrorism "originating from regional countries." Additionally, Muttaqi stated that militant violence in Pakistan was an internal issue for Islamabad and maintained that Afghanistan should not be blamed for Pakistan's domestic security problems.

==== 2025 Afghanistan–Pakistan conflict ====
On 9 October 2025, Kabul was struck by two explosions, believed to be a result of an airstrike by the Pakistan Air Force, particularly in the eastern sectors near Abdul Haq Square, District 8. This happened during the course of the Afghan foreign minister Amir Khan Muttaqi's state visit to India. Taliban retaliated on 11 October and the hostilities culminated into the 2025 Afghanistan–Pakistan conflict. A truce was achieved on 19 October but the peace talks held in Istanbul a week later initially fell apart with both sides trading blame. Pakistan blamed Afghan negotiators for backpaddling on an agreement while Afghanistan accused Pakistan of making unreasonable demands and not addressing issues like violation of airspace. Taliban Interior Minister warned against aggression toward Afghanistan and accused Pakistan of spreading "propaganda" while insisting that TTP issue was Pakistan's internal matter.

On 8 November, talks between the two countries collapsed again but the ceasefire continued. In December 2025, over 1,000 Afghan Islamic scholars issued a joint fatwa resolution barring Afghans from carrying out any terrorist attacks in other countries. The resolution was welcomed by Pakistan, and in return, Pakistani Islamic scholars issued a statement in Karachi urging both governments to resolve their issues through dialogue. Afghan interior minister Sirajuddin Haqqani and Pakistani foreign minister Ishaq Dar both welcomed statements of the Islamic scholars in an effort to cool down relations.

==== 2026 cross-border strikes ====
On 22 February 2026, Pakistani military conducted airstrikes at seven locations in Afghanistan's Nangarhar, Paktika, and Khost provinces, stating it was targeting camps belonging to the Tehrik-i-Taliban Pakistan (TTP) and affiliated groups. Pakistan's Information Minister Attaullah Tarar described the operations as "intelligence-based, selective" strikes conducted in response to recent attacks inside Pakistan, including a 6 February bombing at a mosque in Islamabad that killed at least 31 people. Pakistan's Interior Ministry stated that at least 70 militants were killed, a figure later revised to 80 by Pakistani state media. The Taliban-led Afghan government spokesperson Zabihullah Mujahid stated the strikes killed and wounded civilians, including women and children, and described the operations as a "breach of international law and the principles of good neighbourliness." The Afghan government denied that TTP operates from Afghan territory, a longstanding dispute, and warned of an "appropriate response." Subsequently, the Taliban troops launched a surprise attack on Pakistani border posts, and large-scale clashes broke out between the two countries. On 26 February 2026, clashes erupted between Pakistani and Afghan forces along the Durand Line, prompting Pakistan to launch airstrikes into Afghanistan, resulting in casualties on both sides and escalating tensions between the two nations.

== Trade relations ==
=== Afghan-Pak Transit Trade Agreement ===
In July 2010, a Memorandum of understanding (MoU) was reached between Pakistan and Afghanistan for the Afghan-Pak Transit Trade Agreement (APTTA), which was observed by U.S. Secretary of State Hillary Clinton. The two states also signed an MoU for the construction of rail tracks in Afghanistan to connect with Pakistan Railways (PR), which has been in the making since at least 2005. In October 2010, the landmark APTTA agreement was signed by Pakistani Commerce Minister Makhdoom Amin Fahim and Anwar ul-Haq Ahady, Afghan Ministry of Commerce. The ceremony was attended by Richard Holbrooke, U.S. Special Representative for Afghanistan and Pakistan, and a number of foreign ambassadors, Afghan parliamentarians and senior officials. The APTTA allows Afghan trucks to drive inside Pakistan to the Wagah border with India, and also to the port cities of Karachi and Gwadar.

In November 2010, the two states formed a joint chamber of commerce to expand trade relations and solve the problems traders face. The APTTA agreement has taken effect after several Afghan trucks delivered fruits from Afghanistan to the Wagah border with India in June 2011. With the completion of the APTTA, the United States and other NATO states are planning to revive the ancient Silk Road. This is to help the local economies of Afghanistan and Pakistan by connecting South Asia with Central Asia and the Middle East. The APTTA is intended to improve trade between the two countries but Pakistan often delays Afghan-bound containers, especially after the 2011 NATO attack in Pakistan.

In July 2012, Afghanistan and Pakistan agreed to extend APTTA to Tajikistan in what will be the first step for the establishment of a North–South trade corridor. The proposed agreement will provide facilities to Tajikistan to use Pakistan's Gwadar and Karachi ports for its imports and exports while Pakistan will enjoy trade with Tajikistan under terms similar to the transit arrangement with Afghanistan. Trade between Pakistan and Afghanistan is expected to reach $5 billion by 2015. Afghanistan's economy is one of the fastest growing economies in the world. A 2012 World Bank report added, "In contrast, Afghanistan’s economy grew robustly by about 11 percent mostly due to a good harvest."

Towards the end of the same year, both the governments of Afghanistan and Pakistan drafted plans to talk to the Taliban.

Cooperation between the two countries once included possible defence cooperation and intelligence sharing as well as further enhancement of the two-way trade and abolishment of visas for diplomats from the two nations.

=== Smuggling ===
Research and reporting suggest that informal trade and smuggling linked to the Afghanistan border (including misuse of the Afghan Transit Trade facility) account for a large share of Pakistan's illicit trade losses, estimated at PKR 3.4 trillion (approximately US$12–13 billion) per year in total lost tax revenue; about 30 % of these losses are attributed to misuse of Afghan transit trade mechanisms (i.e., movement of goods through informal channels, tax and tariff arbitrage) rather than official trade routes. Some investigative reporting claims that approximately US$5 million worth of goods may be smuggled daily across the Afghanistan–Pakistan border, reflecting the scale of informal exchange in consumer goods and possibly arms and drugs. In addition to goods, there's also currency and forex smuggling outward from Pakistan towards Afghanistan, with some estimates suggesting US$150 million monthly in dollar smuggling across Pakistan's borders (both Afghanistan and Iran).

=== Tensions ===
Between 2023 and 2026, trade between Pakistan and Afghanistan sharply declined due to political and military tensions. The volume of Afghan goods transiting through Pakistan declined from 102,886 containers, valued at $6.7 billion, in the 2023 financial year to 54,114 containers in 2024, 42,959 in 2025, and just 1,592 containers, valued at $367 million, in 2026.

Afghanistan's long-standing reliance on Pakistani ports has allowed Islamabad to leverage its influence to pressure Kabul into addressing the issue of Pakistani militants hiding within Afghanistan. As border tensions between Afghanistan and Pakistan escalated in 2025, leading to the closure of border crossings, a landlocked Afghanistan increasingly relied on trade routes through Iran and Central Asia to reduce its dependence on Pakistan. According to estimates from the Pakistan-Afghanistan Joint Chamber of Commerce and Industry, bilateral trade could have exceeded $5 billion, but fell to less than $1 billion due to repeated disruptions to border crossings between the two countries.

In 2026, Pakistan lost at least $1 Billion in exports to Afghanistan until the month of October due to the closure of the Torkham and Chaman crossings. In the same period, the country also faced a loss of $225 million in potential exports to the central Asian countries routed via Afghanistan. Around 40,000 to 45.000 containers that would carry Afghan goods through Karachi's ports annually remained stranded in this period costing Pakistan at least $106 million or $1.2 million a day. Afghan exporters lost about $200 million. The same year, the lost trade with Pakistan was replaced by trade with Central Asia and Iran. By August, 48 per cent of Afghanistan's imports arrived through Central Asian routes and 46 per cent through Iran, while Pakistan's share fell to almost zero.

== International disputes ==
=== Lack of mutual trust ===
Further Afghanistan–Pakistan tensions have arisen concerning a variety of issues, as such relations have been precarious and delicate. The TTP's attacks lead to growing tension between the Afghan Taliban government and Pakistan. Border tensions between Afghanistan and Pakistan have escalated to an unprecedented degree following recent instances of violence along the border. The Durand Line witnesses frequent occurrences of suicide bombings, airstrikes, or street battles on an almost daily basis. The Taliban-led Afghan government has also accused Pakistan of undermining relations between Afghanistan and China and creating discord between the neighbouring countries.

=== Deportation of Afghan refugees ===
As relations between the two countries deteriorated following the return of the Taliban to power in Afghanistan, Pakistan has since stepped up its efforts to expel Afghan refugees from its territory.

On 3 October 2023, Pakistan ordered all undocumented Afghan asylum seekers—estimated at 1.7 million individuals—to leave the country by November. The Taliban government called the decision "unacceptable" and urged Pakistan to reconsider.

The year 2025 saw an elevenfold increase to the arrests of Afghans compared to the year prior, according to the UNHCR. At least 100,971 Afghans were detained between 1 January and 8 November 2025, compared with 9,066 during the same period in 2024.

On 5 February 2025, the UN refugee and migration agencies, UNHCR and International Organization for Migration (IOM), expressed concern over Pakistan's plan to begin a new phase of mass deportations targeting nearly 3 million Afghan nationals, including refugees, documented and undocumented migrants, and individuals awaiting relocation to Western countries. The response followed Prime Minister Shehbaz Sharif’s approval of a multistage plan mandating the immediate relocation of all Afghans from Islamabad and Rawalpindi to designated camps prior to repatriation. The UN agencies called for clarity on the plan’s timeline and urged Pakistan to uphold human rights standards, including due process for holders of Afghan Citizen Cards, whose number stood over 800,000.

In March 2025, Pakistan extended the deportation program to all documented Afghan migrants and ordered them to leave by 31 March. The directive was issued after the Afghan Ministry of Refugee and Repatriation Affairs urged Pakistan to slow down the expulsion of Afghans. The directive called on every individual with an Afghan Citizen Card to leave. However, the deadline was extended to 30 April. In April, Pakistan expelled over 80,000 Afghan nationals.

Recent United Nations reports indicate that since the launch of Pakistan’s "Illegal Foreigners Repatriation Plan" in September 2023, over 910,000 Afghans have been deported from Pakistan as of late April 2025.

By October 2025, Pakistan had deported or pressured over one million Afghans to return to Taliban-controlled Afghanistan, including many awaiting US resettlement after working with American forces. The deportations escalated after President Donald Trump suspended refugee admissions, leaving thousands in limbo. While Pakistani authorities had previously honored US-issued protection letters, reports indicated police increasingly ignored them. A senior Pakistani Foreign Ministry official acknowledged some "missteps at the operational level" but denied large-scale deportations of US-affiliated Afghans. Later that month, Pakistan's Defence Minister Khawaja Asif accused Afghan refugees of sheltering terrorists, stating that Pakistan was paying the price of "60 million Afghan refugees for 60 years of hospitality" with its own blood. He urged that it was time for Afghan nationals to return to their country, questioning what kind of guests "shed the blood of their hosts and provide shelter to murderers."

Media advocacy groups like Nai, Supporting Open Media in Afghanistan (Nai SOMA), condemned detention and deportation of Afghan journalists and media workers. The group urged Islamabad to halt the removals and refrain from using refugees as 'leverage' against the Taliban. 15 other organizations like the Committee to Protect Journalists condemned the same.

==== Expulsion of students ====
In September 2026, amid tensions between the two countries, the Pakistan Medical and Dental Council issued a directive ordering expulsion of Afghan medical and dental students enrolled in Pakistani institutions. Amnesty International condemned the decision and urged Pakistan to uphold the "Right to Education." While the Lahore High Court temporarily halted the implementation of the directive, Defence Minister Khawaja Asif criticised Pakistani students in support of Afghan students over their "political leanings."

=== Women's rights issues ===
Among those at risk were Afghan women's rights activists, who fled the Taliban's oppressive rule and now face deportation back to Afghanistan. Many activists, including Humaira Alim, who had been vocal about women's rights and education, fear death or imprisonment if returned. Despite facing severe harassment in Pakistan, these activists, along with other Afghan refugees, have appealed for asylum in third countries. Amnesty International has criticized Pakistan's actions as violations of refugee rights, while local authorities set a deadline of 31 March 2025, for the expulsion of all undocumented Afghan nationals.

In April 2025, at least 1,755 women were reported to have been deported in the first week of the month.

Additionally, Afghan women athletes residing in Pakistan reportedly face a range of issues like economic hardship, limited access to training facilities, and uncertainty regarding their legal status. Many have reported struggling to afford visa renewals. There have been delays reported in the processing of asylum or relocation applications. Athletes with disabilities have raised particular concerns about inadequate consideration of their needs.

There has been considerable amount of anti-Pakistan sentiment in Afghanistan, while negative sentiment towards the Afghan refugees was widespread in Pakistan, even in Pashtun-dominated regions. The Pakistani government has taken significant action against undocumented migrants inside the country and has been expelling all undocumented Afghans.

== Cultural relations ==
Former Afghan President Hamid Karzai (in office 2004–2014) has described Pakistan and Afghanistan as "inseparable brothers" along with that he alleged that Pakistan uses terrorism against Afghanistan, which is due to the historical, religious, and ethnolinguistic connections between the Pashtun people and other ethnic groups of both countries, as well as to trade and other ties.

=== Sport ===
Much of early Afghan cricket was built on the back of returned refugees who had learned the sport in Pakistan.

== See also ==
- List of ambassadors of Afghanistan to Pakistan
- Afghanistan–Pakistan sports rivalries
- Afghanistan–Pakistan border barrier
- Afghanistan–Pakistan border skirmishes
- Anti-Afghan sentiment
- AfPak
- Durand Line
- Khyber Pass Economic Corridor
