= Embassy of Pakistan, Kabul =

Embassy of Pakistan in Kabul, Afghanistan

- Location: Kabul, Afghanistan
- Address: Kārte Parwān, Kabul
- Ambassador: Obaid Ur Rehman Nizamani
- Website: pakembassykabul.org

The Embassy of Pakistan in Kabul is the diplomatic mission of Pakistan in Afghanistan. Pakistan also operates consulates in the Afghan cities of Herat, Jalalabad, Kandahar and Mazar-e-Sharif.

The current Pakistani Ambassador to Afghanistan is Obaid ur Rehman Nizamani.

== Background ==
Located in Kabul's Kārte Parwān neighbourhood, it is Pakistan's largest embassy abroad in terms of size and also one of its busiest. The residence of the Pakistani ambassador enjoins the embassy, together collectively known as the Quaid-e-Azam Complex.

There are presently 60 personnel working at the mission. The operating budget of Pakistani diplomatic missions in Afghanistan was estimated at Rs. 527 million as of 2016.

The embassy provides visa services for Afghans, as well as overseeing bilateral affairs and matters pertaining to Pakistani interests in Afghanistan. English language courses and computer classes are also provided for free to Afghan students in one section of the embassy.

== History ==
The site of the current embassy, whose grounds sprawl over 26 acres, was inaugurated in 2012. The embassy is hosted inside white, palatial colonial-era buildings that previously belonged to the British Legation in Kabul. The British Legation was constructed in 1927, shortly after the 1919 Treaty of Rawalpindi which accorded recognition of Afghanistan's independence.

After 1947, Pakistan's right to ownership of the buildings by virtue of being a successor state to the British Raj was recognised in the 1960s but possession was not formally acceded by the British Foreign and Commonwealth Office until four and a half decades later, by which time most of the complex was in a state of disrepair; only a clock tower on the boundary walls stood undamaged.

After taking control of the property, the Pakistani government renovated and reconstructed the premises within six months, for the purpose of its diplomatic mission. The present-day residential complex of the ambassador, whose construction was ordered by British foreign secretary Lord George Curzon, once housed the British envoy to Afghanistan.

== Incidents ==
Pakistan's diplomatic mission in Kabul has been attacked multiple times. On 30 March 1955, a group of pro-Pashtunistan agitators attacked the embassy and ambassador's residence, also tearing down the Pakistani flag, to protest against the merger of the Pashtun-dominated North-West Frontier Province into West Pakistan province as part of the One Unit policy. The protestors were encouraged by Afghan prime minister Mohammed Daoud Khan and were bussed to the site, and the Afghan police did not intervene. The following day, Pakistan's consulates in Kandahar and Jalalabad were assaulted, and Pakistanis reacted by attacking the Afghan consulate in Peshawar. In 1995, nearly 5,000 protesters sacked the current embassy and in 2003 it was ransacked by a group of 500 protestors.

On 2 December 2022, the embassy came under attack with Chargé d'Affaires to Afghanistan Ubaidur Rehman Nizamani being targeted. Although, Nizamani remained safe, a security guard was "critically injured" in the attack.

== List of Pakistani Ambassadors to Afghanistan ==
Name and Title	Image	Entered Office	Left Office
I. I. Chundrigar		1 May 1948	17 February 1950
Abdul Qadir		early 1950s	?
Aslam Khattak		?	?
Abul Hassan Isphani		1973	1974
Aziz Ahmad Khan		December 1996	June 2000
Rustam Shah Mohmand		14 January 2002	?
Mian Gul Akbar Zeb		2005	2008
Tariq Azizuddin		2008	?
Mohammed Sadiq		2008	2014
Syed Abrar Hussain		25 March 2014	2017
Zahid Nasrullah Khan		2017	August 2020
Mansoor Ahmad Khan		August 2020	Incumbent

== See also ==
- Afghanistan–Pakistan relations
- Embassy of Afghanistan, Islamabad
