= Mansoor Ahmad Khan =

Pakistani diplomat

Ambassador of Pakistan to Afghanistan
- Preceded by: Zahid Nasrullah Khan

Ambassador of Pakistan to Austria
- Preceded by: Aftab Ahmed Khokhar

Permanent Representative of Pakistan to the United Nations in Vienna
- In office June 2018 – August 2020

Personal details
- Born: 1962 (age 63–64)
- Occupation: Diplomat

Mansoor Ahmad Khan (born 1962) is a Pakistani diplomat who is currently serving as ambassador to Afghanistan since June 2020. He has also served as ambassador to Austria and from June 2018 to August 2020 he also served as Permanent Representative of Pakistan to the United Nations in Vienna.
