= United Nations Security Council Resolution 1453 =

UN Security Council Resolution 1453
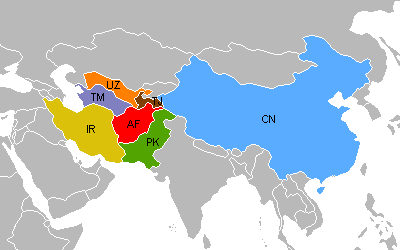
- Countries neighbouring Afghanistan: Afghanistan (red); China (blue); Iran (yellow); Pakistan (green); Tajikistan (brown); Turkmenistan (purple); Uzbekistan (orange)
- Date: 24 December 2002
- Meeting no.: 4,682
- Code: S/RES/1453 (Document)
- Subject: The situation in Afghanistan
- Voting summary: 15 voted for; None voted against; None abstained
- Result: Adopted

Security Council composition
- Permanent members: China; France; Russia; United Kingdom; United States
- Non-permanent members: Bulgaria; Cameroon; Colombia; Guinea; Ireland; Mauritius; Mexico; Norway; Singapore; Syria

United Nations Security Council resolution 1453, adopted unanimously on 24 December 2002, after reaffirming all resolutions on the situation in Afghanistan, the Council endorsed the "Kabul Declaration on Good-Neighbourly Relations" signed by the Afghan government and six neighbouring countries on 22 December 2002.

The Security Council reaffirmed its commitment to the sovereignty, territorial integrity, independence and unity of Afghanistan and recognised the Transitional Administration as the legitimate government until planned elections in 2004. It also stressed support for the implementation of the Bonn Agreement and to provide assistance to the Transitional Administration.

The resolution welcomed the signing of the Kabul Declaration on Good-Neighbourly Relations by Afghanistan, China, Iran, Pakistan, Tajikistan, Turkmenistan and Uzbekistan and called upon all states to respect and implement the agreement. Finally, the Secretary-General Kofi Annan was requested to report on the implementation of the agreement in his reports on Afghanistan.

The Kabul Declaration on Good-Neighbourly Relations emphasised the welfare of the Afghan people, regional peace and stability, a commitment to defeat terrorism, extremism and the illegal drugs trade, and non-interference in each other's internal affairs.

== See also ==
- Afghanistan conflict (1978–present)
- List of United Nations Security Council Resolutions 1401 to 1500 (2002–2003)
- United Nations Assistance Mission in Afghanistan
- War in Afghanistan (2001–2021)
