= United Nations Security Council Resolution 1868 =

UN Security Council Resolution 1868
- Date: 23 March 2009
- Meeting no.: 6,098
- Code: S/RES/1868 (Document)
- Subject: The situation in Afghanistan
- Voting summary: 15 voted for; None voted against; None abstained
- Result: Adopted

Security Council composition
- Permanent members: China; France; Russia; United Kingdom; United States
- Non-permanent members: Austria; Burkina Faso; Costa Rica; Croatia; Japan; Libya; Mexico; Turkey; Uganda; Vietnam

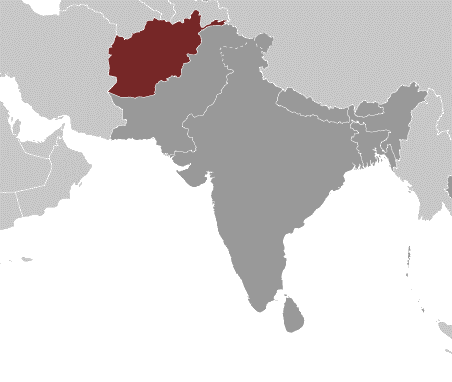

United Nations Security Council Resolution 1868 was unanimously adopted on 23 March 2009.

== Resolution ==
The text of the resolution states:

Deciding this morning to extend the mandate of the United Nations Assistance Mission in Afghanistan (UNAMA) by one year, the Security Council strongly condemned all attacks on civilians and on Afghan and international forces, as well as the use by the Taliban and other extremist groups of civilians as human shields and children as soldiers.

Unanimously adopting resolution 1868 (2009), the Council decided also that UNAMA and the Secretary-General’s Special Representative in Afghanistan, within their mandate and guided by the principle of reinforcing Afghan ownership and leadership, would continue to lead international civilian efforts, in accordance with priorities set forth in paragraph 4 of Council resolution 1806 (2008).

According to the text, those efforts included: promoting more coherent international support and aid effectiveness for Afghanistan; providing political outreach and support to promote implementation of the Afghanistan National Development Strategy and the National Drug Control Strategy; working to improve governance and the rule of law, and to combat corruption; playing a central coordinating role in facilitating humanitarian assistance delivery; helping authorities protect internally displaced persons and creating an environment conducive to their voluntary return; and supporting preparations for the crucial upcoming presidential elections, in particular through the Independent Electoral Commission.

Underscoring the importance of the presidential and provincial council elections to Afghanistan’s democratic development, the Council called for all efforts to ensure the credibility, safety and security of the ballot. It recognized UNAMA’s key role in supporting the electoral process, and called on the Afghan Government and international organizations to fully implement the Afghanistan Compact and meet its benchmarks and timelines for progress in security, governance, the rule of law and human rights, socio-economic issues and counter-narcotics.

Following adoption of the resolution, the representative of Costa Rica expressed concern that the text had been weakened. Contrary to former resolutions on Afghanistan, language expressing concern over the increase in civilian casualties had not been incorporated. While realizing that insurgents bore the prime responsibility for most civilian casualties, Costa Rica called on all parties to avoid inflicting them.

== See also ==
- List of United Nations Security Council Resolutions 1801 to 1900 (2008–2009)
