= United Nations Security Council Resolution 1659 =

UN Security Council Resolution 1659
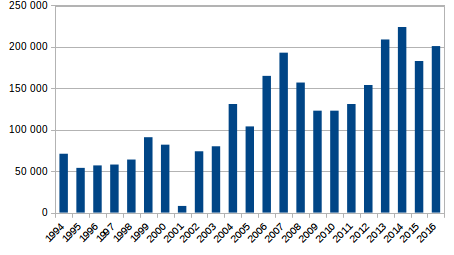
- Opium poppy cultivation in Afghanistan
- Date: 15 February 2006
- Meeting no.: 5,374
- Code: S/RES/1659 (Document)
- Subject: The situation in Afghanistan
- Voting summary: 15 voted for; None voted against; None abstained
- Result: Adopted

Security Council composition
- Permanent members: China; France; Russia; United Kingdom; United States
- Non-permanent members: Argentina; Rep. of the Congo; Denmark; Ghana; Greece; Japan; Peru; Qatar; Slovakia; Tanzania

United Nations Security Council Resolution 1659, adopted unanimously on February 15, 2006, after recalling previous resolutions on the situation in Afghanistan, particularly resolutions 1378 (2001), 1383 (2001) and 1589 (2005), the Council endorsed the "Afghanistan Compact" between the Afghan government and international community concerning the future of the country.

== Resolution ==
=== Observations ===
In the preamble of Resolution 1659, the Council expressed support for the Afghan government and people in their efforts to rebuild the country and stressed their right to determine their own future. It was determined to assist Afghanistan after the completion of the Bonn Process.

Meanwhile, the resolution recognised the interconnected nature of the problems in Afghanistan and stressed the mutually reinforcing issues of progress relating to security, governance and development. It was also important to combat narcotic and terrorist threats posed by the Taliban, Al Qaeda and other groups, as well as enhance regional co-operation.

=== Acts ===
The Security Council endorsed the "Afghanistan Compact" which provided a framework for co-operation between the Afghan government and international community, and called for its full implementation. It affirmed the role of the United Nations in Afghanistan and its efforts to implement the Compact. Furthermore, Council members welcomed the Afghanistan National Development Strategy and financial pledges made by participants at the 2006 London Conference that created the Compact.

The remainder of the resolution recognised the risk of the cultivation, production and trafficking of opium, acknowledged the role of NATO, Operation Enduring Freedom and the International Security Assistance Force (ISAF) in the country, and declared the Security Council's willingness to support the implementation of the "Afghanistan Compact".

== See also ==
- War in Afghanistan (1978–present)
- List of United Nations Security Council Resolutions 1601 to 1700 (2005–2006)
- United Nations Assistance Mission in Afghanistan
- War in Afghanistan (2001–present)
