= United Nations Security Council Resolution 1444 =

UN Security Council Resolution 1444
- Date: 27 November 2002
- Meeting no.: 4,651
- Code: S/RES/1444 (Document)
- Subject: The situation in Afghanistan
- Voting summary: 15 voted for; None voted against; None abstained
- Result: Adopted

Security Council composition
- Permanent members: China; France; Russia; United Kingdom; United States
- Non-permanent members: Bulgaria; Cameroon; Colombia; Guinea; Ireland; Mauritius; Mexico; Norway; Singapore; Syria

United Nations Security Council resolution 1444, adopted unanimously on 27 November 2002, after reaffirming all resolutions on the situation in Afghanistan, particularly resolutions 1386 (2001) and 1413 (2002) and resolutions 1368 (2001) and 1373 (2001) on terrorism, the council extended the authorisation of the International Security Assistance Force (ISAF) for a period of one year beyond 20 December 2002.

The security council recognised that the responsibility for providing security and law and order throughout Afghanistan resided with Afghans themselves. It appreciated Turkey's leadership of ISAF that had previously been under the control of the United Kingdom, and the contributions of many nations to the force. Meanwhile, it welcomed offers from Germany and the Netherlands to succeed Turkey in the leadership of ISAF. The council also determined the situation in Afghanistan to be a threat to international peace and security and required ISAF to fulfil its mandate.

Acting under Chapter VII of the United Nations Charter, the council extended the authorisation for ISAF in Afghanistan for one year until 20 December 2003, and for all nations participating in ISAF to use all necessary measures to fulfil its mandate. States were called upon to provide personnel, equipment and other resources to ISAF and the voluntary trust fund.

Finally, the leadership of ISAF was required to submit quarterly reports on the implementation of its mandate. The force was only able to carry out its mandate in the capital Kabul and the Afghan government had called for it to be deployed throughout the country to provide security.

== See also ==
- Afghan Transitional Administration
- Bonn Agreement
- War in Afghanistan (1978–present)
- List of United Nations Security Council Resolutions 1401 to 1500 (2002–2003)
- United Nations Assistance Mission in Afghanistan
- War in Afghanistan (2001–present)
