= Lathrop =

Lathrop may refer to:

== Places ==
- Lathrop, California, city in San Joaquin County, California, United States
- Lathrop, Michigan, an unincorporated community
- Lathrop, Missouri, city in Clinton County, Missouri, United States
- Lathrop Township, Pennsylvania, Susquehanna County, Pennsylvania, United States

== People ==
- Austin E. Lathrop (1865–1950), American industrialist
- Barbour Lathrop (1847–1927), American philanthropist
- Clarissa Caldwell Lathrop (1847–1892), American social reformer, autobiographer
- Cyrus L. Lathrop (1862–1941), American politician
- Dorothy P. Lathrop (1891–1980), American author and illustrator
- Francis Lathrop (1849–1909), American artist
- George Parsons Lathrop (1851–1898), American poet and novelist
- Gertrude K. Lathrop (1896–1996), American sculptor
- Henry A. Lathrop (1848–1911), American physician and politician
- Ida Pulis Lathrop (1859–1937), American painter
- John Lathrop (judge) (1835–1910), an Associate Justice of the Supreme Judicial Court of Massachusetts
- Jack Lathrop (1913–1987), jazz guitarist and vocalist
- Jay W. Lathrop (1927–2022), American engineer, inventor of photolithography
- Jedediah Hyde Lathrop (1806–1889), American merchant and government official
- John Lathrop (disambiguation), multiple people
- John Hiram Lathrop (1799–1866), first president of both the University of Missouri and the University of Wisconsin as well as
- Julia Lathrop (1858–1932), American social reformer
- Philip H. Lathrop (1912–1995), American cinematographer
- Rose Hawthorne Lathrop (1851–1926), American Roman Catholic nun and social worker
- Steve Lathrop (born 1957), American politician
- William Langson Lathrop (1859–1938), American landscape painter
- The Lathrop sisters (Clara, Bessie, and Susanne), American artists and educators from Massachusetts
- Lathrop Burgess, American politician

== Other ==
- Lathrop High School (Alaska), public high school in Fairbanks, Alaska, United States
- Lathrop High School (California), public secondary school in Lathrop, California
