= Lathrop Township =

Lathrop Township may refer to the following places in the United States:

- Lathrop Township, Clinton County, Missouri
- Lathrop Township, Susquehanna County, Pennsylvania

== See also ==
- Lathrop (disambiguation)
