= New Rochelle 250th Anniversary half dollar =

Commemorative coin

- United States
- Value: 50 cents (0.50 US dollars)
- Mass: 12.5 g
- Diameter: 30.61 mm (1.20 in)
- Thickness: 2.15 mm (0.08 in)
- Edge: Reeded
- Composition: 90.0% silver; 10.0% copper
- Silver: 0.36169 troy oz
- Years of minting: 1937 (dated 1938)
- Mintage: 25,015 including 15 pieces for the Assay Commission (9,749 melted)
- Mint marks: None, all pieces struck at the Philadelphia Mint without mint mark

Obverse
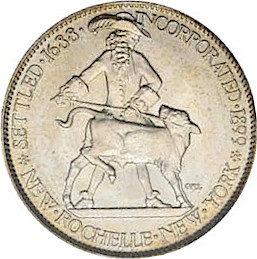
- Design: John Pell and "Fatt Calfe"
- Designer: Gertrude K. Lathrop
- Design date: 1937

Reverse
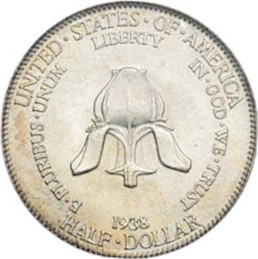
- Design: Fleur de lis
- Designer: Gertrude K. Lathrop
- Design date: 1937

The New Rochelle 250th Anniversary half dollar is a commemorative coin struck by the United States Bureau of the Mint to mark the 250th anniversary of the settling of New Rochelle in Westchester County, New York. Artist Gertrude K. Lathrop designed the piece; she was chosen after work by Lorrilard Wise was rejected by the federal Commission of Fine Arts (CFA). The coin depicts a fatted calf on one side, being led by John Pell, who sold the land on which New Rochelle now stands; the other shows a fleur de lis, an element of the city seal of New Rochelle and of France's La Rochelle, its eponym. The piece is dated 1938 but was minted the previous year. The New Rochelle piece was the last new-design commemorative struck by the Mint until 1946.

Aware of the many commemorative issues being authorized by the U.S. Congress in the mid-1930s, members of the Westchester County Coin Club sought a half dollar for the New Rochelle anniversary. They gained the support of members of Congress, who secured the passage of legislation for the half dollar during 1936. After Wise's work was rejected, Lathrop was hired based on her work on the Albany Charter half dollar (1936). She decided to depict the "fatt calfe" which was to be presented annually to Pell if he asked for it, lest New Rochelle's land be forfeited back to him. The CFA approved her work, and the coins were struck at the Philadelphia Mint in 1937.

New Rochelle's coin committee sold the half dollar for $2 locally, and by mail order to all 48 states and internationally, during late 1937 and early 1938. When sales slowed, 9,749 pieces were returned to the mint for redemption and melting. They have risen in price and now sell in the low hundreds of dollars. Lathrop's work has been both praised and criticized by numismatic commentators.

== Background ==
The city of New Rochelle, New York, in Westchester County, was founded by Huguenots from La Rochelle in France in 1688. The following year, Jacob Leisler, their agent, purchased from John Pell a tract of some 6,000 acres (2,400 ha) on which the city now stands. One of the conditions of the sale was that Leisler would give to Pell and his heirs "one fatt calfe" on June 24 of every year thereafter, if demanded. British-American political theorist Thomas Paine later owned land in New Rochelle, which was incorporated as a village in 1858 and as a city in 1899. It is now a suburb of New York City.

Sparked by new issues with low mintages for which the demand was greater than the supply, the market for United States commemorative coins spiked in 1936. Until 1954, the entire mintage of such issues was sold by the government at face value to a group authorized by Congress, who then tried to sell the coins at a profit to the public. The new pieces then came on to the secondary market, and in early 1936 all earlier commemoratives sold at a premium to their issue prices. The apparent easy profits to be made by purchasing and holding commemoratives attracted many to the coin collecting hobby, where they sought to purchase the new issues. Congress authorized an explosion of commemoratives in 1936; no fewer than fifteen were issued for the first time. One coin authorized and issued in 1936 was the Cincinnati Musical Center half dollar, controlled and profited from by Thomas G. Melish and issued to celebrate a nonexistent anniversary. At the request of the groups authorized to purchase them, several half dollars minted in previous years were produced again, dated 1936, senior among them the Oregon Trail Memorial half dollar, first struck in 1926.

By April 1936, Congress had reacted to these practices, adding protections to commemorative coinage bills. These included a requirement that all coins be struck at a single mint, rather than all three then operating as with earlier issues (the use of mint marks would force coin collectors to buy three near-identical coins to have a complete set). Such provisions were in the New Rochelle half dollar bill; they could only be coined at one mint and all pieces were required to bear the date 1938, though the authorization took place in 1936 and the striking of the coins in 1937. They would be issued at face value to a committee of not less than three members appointed by the mayor of New Rochelle.

The moving force behind the New Rochelle issue was the Westchester County Coin Club, including collectors Julius Guttag (of Guttag Brothers, a prominent New York City coin dealer) and Pitt M. Skipton, who planned the issue to avoid the abuses of earlier commemoratives. The issue originated in discussions between club members, who were aware of the many commemoratives being issued in the mid-1930s. The idea was attractive as the piece would help fund the 250th anniversary celebrations in New Rochelle, rather than draw on taxpayers strained by the Depression. The coin club, at its November 1935 meeting, appointed Skipton as a one-man committee to make the necessary contacts to gain authorization for the issue.

== Legislation ==
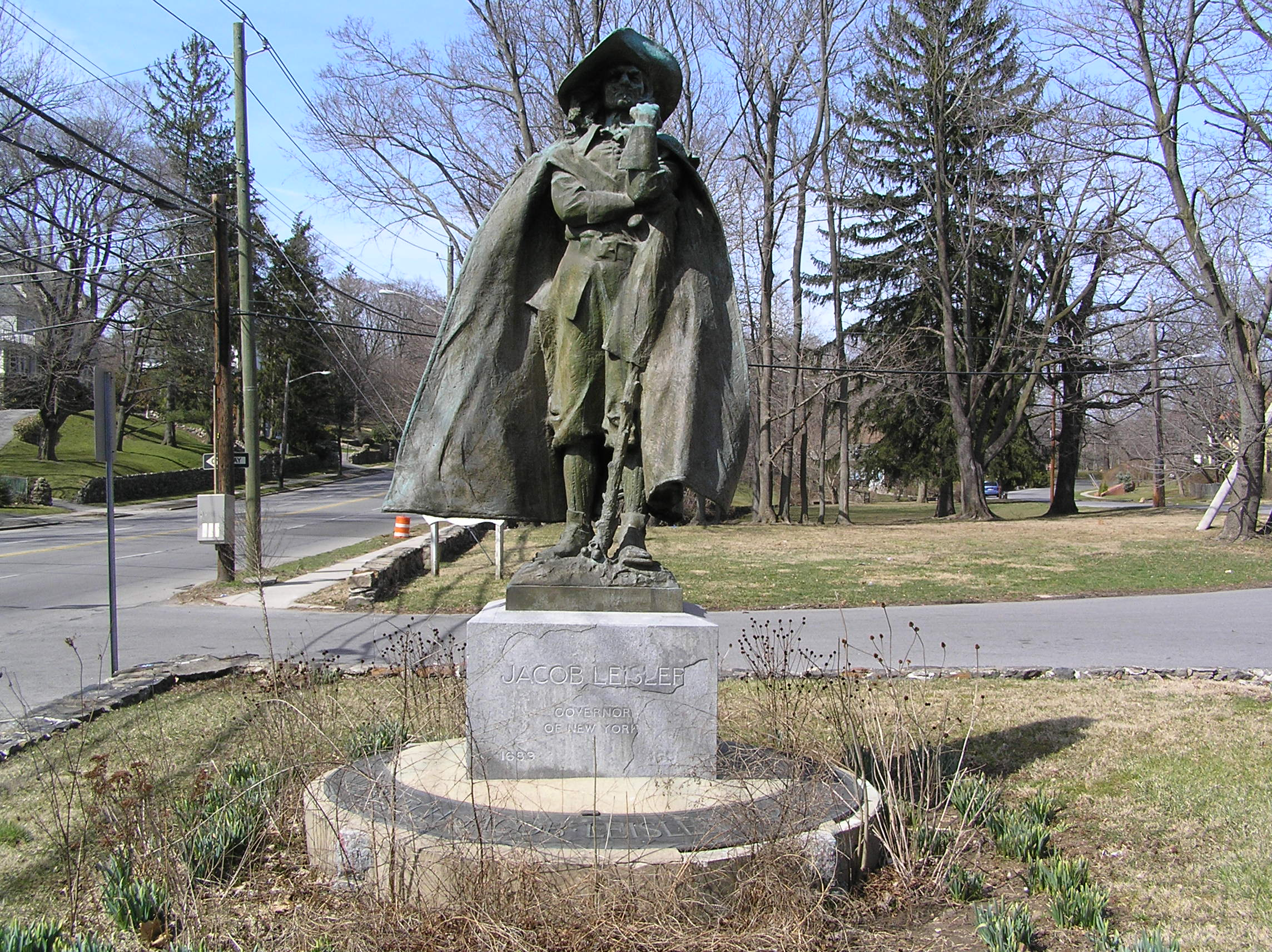
Statue of Jacob Leisler, New Rochelle, New York

Bills for a New Rochelle half dollar were introduced in both houses of Congress in January 1936; in the Senate by Royal S. Copeland and in the House by Charles D. Millard, both of New York. Skipton had contacted both legislators, who had agreed to help, though Senator Copeland had warned, "The President is pretty hard-boiled on this subject." The House bill reported back favorably from the Committee on Coinage, Weights, and Measures on February 17, 1936, proposed amendments increasing the authorized mintage from 20,000 to 25,000 and requiring there to be a committee of not less than three people to order the coins on behalf of New Rochelle. The House adopted the amendments and passed the bill without debate on March 16, 1936.

The Senate bill was referred to the Committee on Banking and Currency; it was one of several commemorative half dollar bills to be considered on March 11, 1936, by a subcommittee led by Colorado's Alva B. Adams. Senator Adams had heard of the commemorative coin abuses of the mid-1930s, when issuers increased the number of pieces needed for a complete set by having them issued with different dates and mint marks; authorizing legislation placed no prohibition on this. Lyman W. Hoffecker, a Texas coin dealer and official of the American Numismatic Association, testified and told the subcommittee that some issues, like the Oregon Trail pieces, had been issued over the course of years with different dates and mint marks. Other issues had been entirely bought up by single dealers, and some low-mintage varieties of commemoratives were selling at high prices. The many varieties and inflated prices for some issues that resulted from these practices angered collectors trying to keep their collections current.

The Senate took no further action on Copeland's bill, but on March 26, 1936, Senator Adams reported back the House bill to the Senate, entirely rewriting it to incorporate protections such as requiring all of the New Rochelle coins to have the same date and mint mark, and to be issued to the sponsoring organization in lots of not less than 5,000. He recommended that future commemorative coin bills have similar protections. The Senate considered the bill on March 27, the fifth in a series of six commemorative coin bills being considered by that body, and like the others, the New Rochelle bill was amended and passed without debate or dissent.

As the two houses had passed different versions, the bill returned to the House of Representatives. On April 17, 1936, John J. Cochran of Missouri moved that the House agree to the Senate amendment, though with one change: that instead of no less than 5,000 being issued at one time, no less than 25,000 could be issued at one time. Cochran explained to Marion A. Zioncheck of Washington state that this was for the protection of the collector. The House agreed without further debate, and on April 27, 1936, on the motion of Adams, so did the Senate. President Franklin D. Roosevelt signed the bill into law on May 5, 1936. According to coin dealer B. Max Mehl in his 1937 volume on commemoratives, "Having visited New Rochelle on two or three occasions, I don't quite comprehend why this town rates a commemorative coin ... But apparently it must have, and it does have, some active collectors who apparently knew the art of string-pulling and got the bill for the coin through Congress for an issue of 25,000 coins which will be distributed at $2 per."

== Preparation ==
The New Rochelle Commemorative Coin Committee was formed by Mayor Harry Scott of New Rochelle with the membership being Pitt Skipton as chair, Ernest H. Watson as treasurer and Jere Milleman as secretary. Assisting was Amy Skipton, spouse of Pitt Skipton, who served as executive secretary. The Committee initially hired Lorrilard Wise to design the half dollar. He depicted a Native American sitting among vegetation watching the settlers' ship sail in before a rising sun for the obverse, with a representation of New Rochelle's coat of arms for the reverse. On July 17, 1936, the Commission of Fine Arts (CFA), charged by a 1921 executive order by President Warren G. Harding with rendering advisory opinions regarding public artworks, including coins, considered the design and raised several concerns, including whether the man depicted was based on a member of a local tribe. In a letter dated July 20 to Assistant Director of the Mint Mary M. O'Reilly, the Commission suggested the obverse be entirely redone. Wise submitted new models on August 17, and these were approved by the CFA on September 6. In the meantime, the Coin Committee was receiving many orders, and some would-be purchasers were becoming impatient.

Members of the CFA almost immediately reconsidered. Sculptor-member Lee Lawrie believed the design about the best that Wise could do, and given the few sculptors he believed capable of the work, was inclined to let the issue go ahead. Eugene Savage and Gilmore Clarke, also members, did not agree and after rejecting a design revision on October 23, the CFA asked that the New Rochelle Committee hire a new sculptor. By mid-November, the Skiptons had seen an example of the Albany Charter half dollar, designed by Gertrude K. Lathrop, who was hired to replace Wise and who spent many hours in New Rochelle, studying local views. Lathrop's appearance in New Rochelle came as something of a surprise to Pitt and Amy Skipton, who knew of her as G.K. Lathrop, and had assumed she was a man. After several meetings between Lathrop and Pitt Skipton, both decided on the fatted calf for the obverse and a fleur-de-lis, an element of the shield of New Rochelle, for the reverse.

The CFA took some time to decide, apparently under the impression the old coat of arms reverse was still to be used. Lathrop knew President Roosevelt from his days as Governor of New York and went to Washington to lobby for her designs; on her return she stated the CFA would approve the calf obverse and that both reverses were acceptable. After discussion, the Coin Committee affirmed its support of the fleur-de-lis design. On February 18, 1937, the CFA approved both of her designs with the concurrence of the new sculptor-member, Paul Manship. It conveyed its approval to Director of the Mint Nellie Tayloe Ross the following day. On March 12, the Treasury Department received $300 to pay for the coinage dies for the issue (by law the sponsoring committee's responsibility) and in early April it received $12,500 to pay in advance for the half dollars.

== Design ==
Beautiful coin, so silvery white
Little did Huguenots dream in their flight
That a city they'd found like our own New Rochelle
Where folks of all creeds in amity dwell.
On your reverse you bear the Lily-of-France
While on obverse once more the "fatt calfe" doth prance
And Lord Pell in a costume befitting the day
Receives him as "quit rent"—so our annals do say.
North, South, East and West, little coin, you have sped
With New Rochelle's story of heroes long dead
Who feared not the hardships but stubbornly fought
For the Faith that they loved and the Freedom they sought.
God grant, little coin, that the story thus told
May live on forever and character mold
In a form where there's Beauty, Faith, Hope, Truth and Love
And over us hover sweet Peace like the dove.

— "The New Rochelle Half Dollar", by Amy C. Skipton

The obverse shows a fatted calf, roped and held by a man in elegant dress who is meant to be John Pell. Lathrop studied paintings in the possession of Pell's descendants to achieve the likeness. The model for the calf lived on Kenwood Farm of Albany, New York, owned by Parker Corning, congressman from New York, and was a thoroughbred Guernsey calf lent to the sculptor. Lathrop stated that the calf was a bit unruly at first, but grew so accustomed to her presence that it would kiss her on the nose when it was allowed. The sculptor intended, with the calf design, to inject a touch of humor while maintaining dignity and beauty.

Arranged in arcs around the periphery of the obverse are the legends "NEW•ROCHELLE•NEW•YORK" and "SETTLED•1688•INCORPORATED•1899". The artist’s initials "GKL" appear to the right of the calf’s forelegs. The half dollar's reverse depicts a Fleur de lis, an element found within the city’s coat of arms and borrowed from the arms of La Rochelle, France. Arranged in arcs around the periphery are the statutory inscriptions "UNITED•STATES•OF•AMERICA, E•PLURIBUS•UNUM, LIBERTY" and "IN• GOD•WE•TRUST". The date 1938 and value "HALF•DOLLAR" appear at the bottom in two lines. The New Rochelle half dollar is the last U.S. coin to have denticles along the rim, a feature that had been previously eliminated on the circulating coinage. It was also the last new-design commemorative to be struck by the U.S. until 1946.

Frank Duffield, editor of The Numismatist, wrote at the time of issue that "Again Miss Gertrude K. Lathrop, of Albany, has scored with her designs for the New Rochelle half dollar. The Albany coin, also designed by her, is regarded by many collectors as one of the most attractive in the entire commemorative series." Numismatist Stuart Mosher, in his 1940 work on commemorative coins, praised the New Rochelle piece, stating that Lathrop "has produced in this one a most pleasing effect. The calf was modeled from life, and the colonial costume on the figure of Lord Pell has been accurately reproduced according to the style of that period. One of the handicaps belaboring every artist who attempts to design a coin for the United States government is the multiplicity of legends that must be used so as to comply with our coinage laws. In this instance the artist has arranged them in an orderly manner on the reverse, thus avoiding the cramped effect so often found on our coins when the designer attempts to crowd too many ideas into a small space."

Art historian Cornelius Vermeule, in his volume on American coins and medals, called the New Rochelle half dollar "a simple, bold, and absolutely tasteless coin". He wrote that "aestheticians demanding bovine fidelity can take comfort in the fact" that the calf's model came from Congressman Corning's farm. Vermeule stated, "it is small wonder that, on seeing a coin such as this, President Franklin Roosevelt urged a moratorium on their issue. More distressing is the fact that the accumulated prejudice against commemorative half-dollars" meant that none were issued, twenty-five years later, for the Civil War Centennial, despite the "clever fare in the artistry of American coinage" provided by "fatted calves".

== Distribution and collecting ==
In April 1937, a total of 25,015 New Rochelle half dollars were struck at the Philadelphia Mint, 15 pieces being reserved for inspection and testing at the 1938 meeting of the annual Assay Commission. As the Bureau of the Mint deemed it undesirable to turn the coins over to the Westchester County Coin Club, they were instead sent to the First National Bank of New Rochelle, where they arrived on April 16, 1937. Lathrop visited and stated she was pleased with the new half dollars. At the bank, the many mail orders were processed by the Skiptons and others; the bank also had a window for locals wanting to buy a few coins. They were sold through local banks and through mail order at $2 each plus postage and insurance for coins sent through the mails. The first coin struck was presented to Mayor Scott; the second to the president of the Westchester County Coin Club. The Coin Committee filled orders from all 48 states, Puerto Rico, Hawaii Territory, the Canal Zone, Canada, New Zealand and the Dutch East Indies. By 1937, the market for commemoratives had crashed due to too many different issues, and sales ground to a halt after just over half the coins sold. Members of the Coin Club bought several hundred specimens at face value, and 9,749 half dollars were returned to the Philadelphia Mint in mid-1938 for redemption and melting. This left a total of 15,266 coins extant, counting the assay pieces. The profits generated by the sale were used to help fund the city's 250th anniversary celebrations in June 1938.

Fifty pieces were struck in proof condition on polished planchets, each placed in a box along with a silver medal and presented to dignitaries, members of the Coin Committee, and selected members of the Westchester County Coin Club. At least one piece was struck in matte proof for Mint Chief Engraver John R. Sinnock.

By 1940, the New Rochelle half dollar sold for $1.75, and reached $6 by 1950. By 1970, the market price was $67 and by 1985, $500. The deluxe edition of R. S. Yeoman's A Guide Book of United States Coins, published in 2018, lists the piece for between $310 and $425, depending on condition. An exceptional specimen sold for $3,593 in 2006.

The requirement that Pell's family be presented with a fatted calf became void after the American Revolution; with title to the land no longer subject to forfeiture, the presentation has been made from time to time since, for example on the 250th anniversary of settlement in 1938 and the 300th in 1988. On the latter occasion, those representing the Pell family included Claiborne Pell, U.S. senator from Rhode Island. The calf refused to cooperate with events and it took four men to drag it onto the stage before it was allowed to return to its abode on a farm in Granite Springs; the roast beef served at the luncheon that followed came from a less fortunate source. Had a calf been purchased, rather than borrowed, for the ceremony, it would have cost about $1,000 for the gift to William Rodman Pell 2d, '"sixteenth claimant to the Lordship and Manor of Pelham", who would have been unable to take it home, as local ordinances forbade the keeping of livestock.

== Sources ==
- Bowers, Q. David (1992). Commemorative Coins of the United States: A Complete Encyclopedia. Wolfeboro, NH: Bowers and Merena Galleries, Inc. ISBN 978-0-943161-35-8.
- Duffield, Frank (uncredited) (April 1937). "New Rochelle commemorative half dollar". The Numismatist. American Numismatic Association: 305.
- Flynn, Kevin (2008). The Authoritative Reference on Commemorative Coins 1892–1954. Roswell, GA: Kyle Vick. OCLC 711779330.
- Fuljenz, Michael (February 1983). "The Fatt Calfe: New Rochelle's commemorative half dollar". The Numismatist. American Numismatic Association: 263–68.
- Skipton, Amy C. (1939). One Fatt Calfe. New Rochelle, NY: New Rochelle Commemorative Coin Committee. OCLC 181163409.
- Slabaugh, Arlie R. (1975). United States Commemorative Coinage (second ed.). Racine, WI: Whitman Publishing. ISBN 978-0-307-09377-6.
- Swiatek, Anthony (2012). Encyclopedia of the Commemorative Coins of the United States. Chicago, IL: KWS Publishers. ISBN 978-0-9817736-7-4.
- Swiatek, Anthony; Breen, Walter (1981). The Encyclopedia of United States Silver & Gold Commemorative Coins, 1892 to 1954. New York, NY: Arco Publishing. ISBN 978-0-668-04765-4.
- Taxay, Don (1967). An Illustrated History of U.S. Commemorative Coinage. New York, NY: Arco Publishing. ISBN 978-0-668-01536-3.
- United States Senate Committee on Banking and Currency (March 11, 1936). Coinage of commemorative 50-cent pieces. United States Government Printing Office.
- Vermeule, Cornelius (1971). Numismatic Art in America. Cambridge, MA: The Belknap Press of Harvard University Press. ISBN 978-0-674-62840-3.
- Yeoman, R. S. (2018). A Guide Book of United States Coins (Mega Red 4th ed.). Atlanta, GA: Whitman Publishing. ISBN 978-0-7948-4580-3.
