= Animals of the Bible =

1937 picture book

- Author: Text compiled by Helen Dean Fish
- Illustrator: Dorothy P. Lathrop
- Genre: Children's picture book
- Publisher: J. B. Lippincott Company
- Publication date: 1937
- Publication place: United States
- Pages: 72
- ISBN: 0-397-31536-8
- OCLC: 2152935

Animals of the Bible is a book illustrated by Dorothy P. Lathrop with text compiled by Helen Dean Fish from the Bible. Released by J. B. Lippincott Company, it was the first recipient of the Caldecott Medal for illustration in 1938.

== Plot ==
Animals of the Bible takes 31 Biblical stories of creatures who helped Biblical heroes complete their tasks and illustrates them.

Awards
Preceded by NONE	Caldecott Medal recipient 1938	Succeeded by Mei Li
