= John Lathrop =

John Lathrop may refer to:

- Jack Lathrop (John Marcus Lathrop, 1913–1987), jazz guitarist and vocalist
- John Lothropp (1584–1653), British clergy
- John Lathrop (American minister) (1740–1816), of Boston, Mass
- John Hiram Lathrop (1799–1866), educator
- John W. Lathrop (born 1960), California Army National Guard general
- John Lathrop (judge) (1833–1910), associate justice of the Massachusetts Supreme Judicial Court
