= Walter de la Mare =

English poet and fiction writer (1873–1956)

Walter de la Mare OM CH
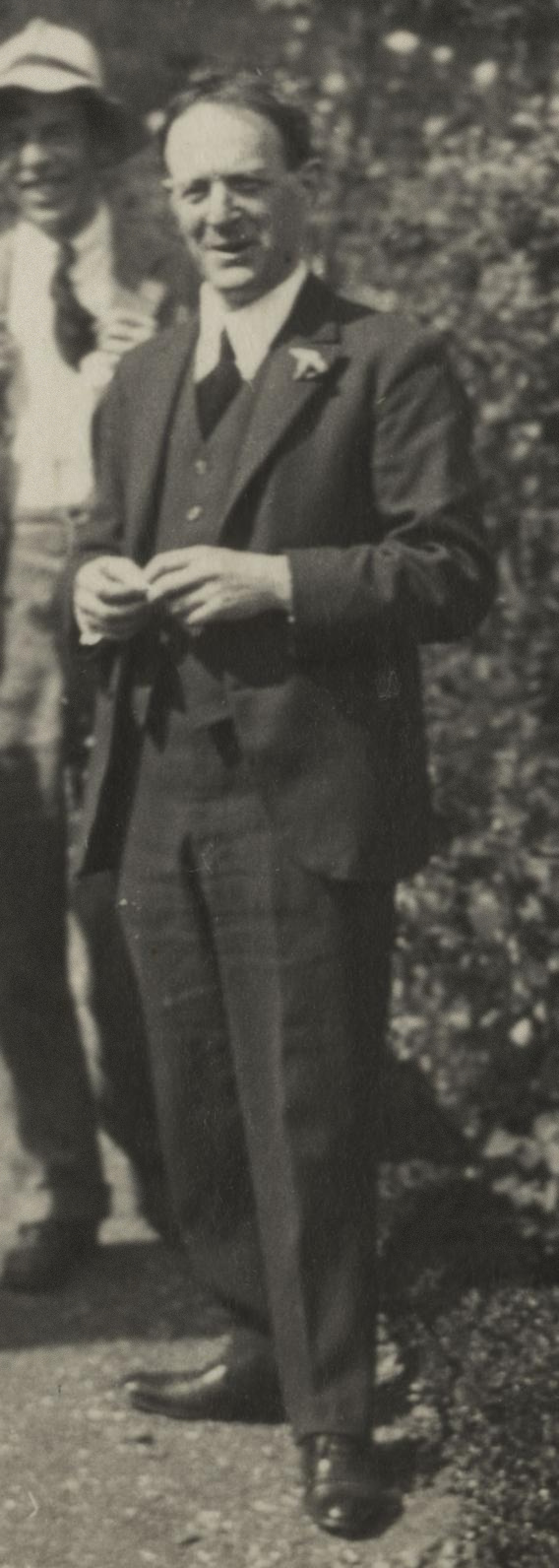
- Photo of Walter de la Mare by Lady Ottoline Morrell
- Born: Walter John de la Mare; 25 April 1873; Charlton, Kent, England
- Died: 22 June 1956 (aged 83); Twickenham, Middlesex, England
- Occupation: Writer
- Writing career
- Genres: Poetry; Supernatural fiction Children's literature
- Notable awards: James Tait Black Memorial Prize; 1921; Carnegie Medal; 1947

Walter John de la Mare OM CH (/ˈdɛləˌmɛər/; 25 April 1873 – 22 June 1956) was an English poet, short story writer and novelist. He is probably best remembered for his works for children, for his poem "The Listeners", and for his psychological horror short fiction, including "Seaton's Aunt", "The Green Room" and "All Hallows". In 1921, his novel Memoirs of a Midget won the James Tait Black Memorial Prize for fiction, and his post-war Collected Stories for Children won the 1947 Carnegie Medal for British children's books.

== Life ==
De la Mare was born at 83, Maryon Road, Charlton, then in the county of Kent but now part of the Royal Borough of Greenwich. He was partly descended from a family of French Huguenot silk merchants through his father, James Edward de la Mare (1811–1877), a principal at the Bank of England; his mother was James's second wife, Lucy Sophia (1838–1920), daughter of a Scottish naval surgeon and author, Dr Colin Arrott Browning. (The suggestion that Lucy was related to the poet Robert Browning has been found to be incorrect.) He had two brothers, Francis Arthur Edward and James Herbert, and four sisters, Florence Mary, Constance Eliza, Ethel (who died in infancy) and Ada Mary. De la Mare preferred to be known as "Jack" to his family and friends, as he disliked the name Walter.

De la Mare was educated at St Paul's Cathedral School, then worked from 1890 to 1908 in the statistics department of the London office of Standard Oil. He left the company after Sir Henry Newbolt arranged for him to receive a Civil List pension so that he could concentrate on writing.

In 1892 de la Mare joined the Esperanza Amateur Dramatics Club, where he met and fell in love with (Constance) Elfrida Ingpen, the leading lady, who was ten years older than him. Her father, William Alfred Ingpen, was Clerk to the Insolvent Debtors Court and Clerk of the Rules. De la Mare and Elfrida were married on 4 August 1899, and they went on to have two sons and two daughters. The family lived in Beckenham and Anerley from 1899 till 1924. The home in Anerley in South London was the scene of many parties, notable for imaginative games of charades.

From 1925 to 1939, de la Mare lived at Hill House, Taplow.

On 7 September 1929, his daughter, Janette de la Mare married Donald John Ringwood in Taplow, Buckinghamshire, England.

In 1940 Elfrida de la Mare was diagnosed with Parkinson's disease. She spent the rest of her life as an invalid and died in 1943.

From 1940 until his death de la Mare lived in South End House, Montpelier Row, Twickenham, on the same street on which Alfred, Lord Tennyson, had lived. De la Mare won the annual Carnegie Medal, from the Library Association, recognising the year's best children's book by a British subject, for his Collected Stories for Children (Faber and Faber, 1947). It was the first collection to win the award.

De la Mare suffered from a coronary thrombosis in 1947 and died of another in 1956. He spent his final year mostly bedridden, being cared for by a nurse whom he loved but never had a physical relationship with. His ashes are buried in the crypt of St Paul's Cathedral, where he had once been a choirboy.

== Profile ==
=== Come Hither ===
Come Hither is an anthology edited by de la Mare, mostly of poems, but with some prose. It has a frame story and can be read on several levels. It was first published in 1923 and was a success; further editions have followed. It includes a selection of poems by the leading Georgian poets (from de la Mare's perspective).

=== Supernaturalism ===
De la Mare was, notably, a writer of ghost stories. His collections Eight Tales, The Riddle and Other Stories, The Connoisseur and Other Stories, On the Edge and The Wind Blows Over each contain several ghost stories.

De la Mare's supernatural horror writings were favourites of H. P. Lovecraft, who in his comprehensive study Supernatural Horror in Literature said that de la Mare "is able to put into his occasional fear-studies a keen potency which only a rare master can achieve". Lovecraft singled out for praise de la Mare's short stories "Seaton's Aunt", "The Tree", "Out of the Deep", "Mr Kempe", "A Recluse" and "All Hallows", along with his novel The Return.

Gary William Crawford has described de la Mare's supernatural fiction for adults as being "among the finest to appear in the first half of this century", whilst noting the disparity between the high quality and low quantity of de la Mare's mature horror stories. Other notable de la Mare ghost/horror stories are "A:B:O", "Crewe", "The Green Room" and "Winter".

A number of later writers of supernatural fiction have cited de la Mare's ghost stories as inspirational, including Robert Aickman, Ramsey Campbell, David A. McIntee and Reggie Oliver. Horror fiction scholar S. T. Joshi has said that de la Mare's supernatural fiction "should always have an audience that will shudder apprehensively at its horror and be moved to somber reflection by its pensive philosophy".

=== Children's literature ===
For children de la Mare wrote the fairy tale The Three Mulla Mulgars (1910, later retitled The Three Royal Monkeys), praised by the literary historian Julia Briggs as a "neglected masterpiece" and by the critic Brian Stableford as a "classic animal fantasy". Richard Adams described it as his favourite novel.

Joan Aiken cited some of de la Mare's short stories, such as "The Almond Tree" and "Sambo and the Snow Mountains", for their sometimes unexplained quality, which she also employed in her own work.

=== Theory of imagination ===
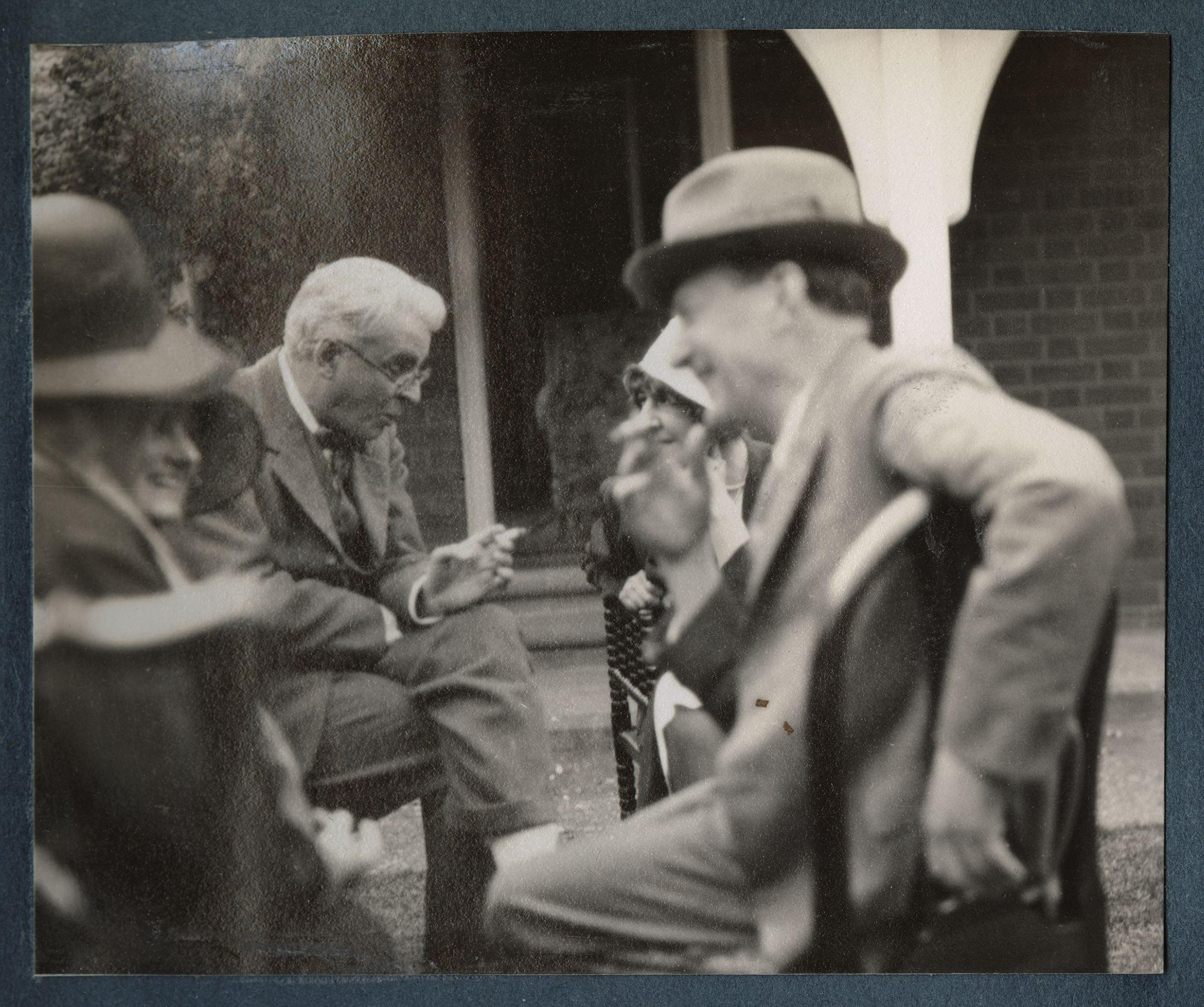
De la Mare (right) with W. B. Yeats and others (photo by Lady Ottoline Morrell)

De la Mare described two distinct "types" of imagination – although "aspects" might be a better term: the childlike and the boylike. It was at the border between the two that Shakespeare, Dante, and the rest of the great poets lay.

De la Mare opined that all children fall into the category of having a childlike imagination at first, which is usually replaced at some point in their lives. He explained in the lecture "Rupert Brooke and the Intellectual Imagination" (Note: In the lecture "Rupert Brooke and the Intellectual Imagination" de la Mare uses the term "imagination" for both the intellectual and the visionary. To simplify and clarify his language de la Mare generally used the more conventional "reason" and "imagination" when discussing the same idea elsewhere.) that children "are not bound in by their groping senses. Facts to them are the liveliest of chameleons. [...] They are contemplatives, solitaries, fakirs, who sink again and again out of the noise and fever of existence and into a waking vision." His biographer Doris Ross McCrosson summarises this passage, "Children are, in short, visionaries." This visionary view of life can be seen as either vital creativity and ingenuity, or fatal disconnection from reality (or, in a limited sense, both).

The increasing intrusions of the external world upon the mind, however, frighten the childlike imagination, which "retires like a shocked snail into its shell". From then onward the boyish imagination flourishes, the "intellectual, analytical type".

By adulthood (de la Mare proposed), the childlike imagination has either retreated forever or grown bold enough to face the real world. Thus emerge the two extremes of the spectrum of adult minds: logical and deductive or intuitive and inductive. For de la Mare, "The one knows that beauty is truth, the other reveals that truth is beauty." Yet another way he puts it is that the visionary's source of poetry is within, while the intellectual's sources are without – external – in "action, knowledge of things, and experience" (McCrosson's phrasing). De la Mare hastens to add that this does not make the intellectual's poetry any less good, but it is clear where his own preference lies.

== Works ==
=== Novels ===
- Henry Brocken (1904)
- The Three Mulla Mulgars (1910) (edition illustrated by Dorothy P. Lathrop [1919]), also published as The Three Royal Monkeys (children's novel)
- The Return (1910; revised edition 1922; second revised edition 1945)
- Memoirs of a Midget (1921)
- Mr Bumps and His Monkey (1942) (illustrated by Dorothy P. Lathrop)

=== Short story collections ===
- The Riddle and Other Stories (1923): "The Almond Tree", "The Count's Courtship", "The Looking-Glass", "Miss Duveen", "Selina's Parable", "Seaton's Aunt", "The Bird of Travel", "The Bowl", "The Three Friends", "Lispet", "Lispet and Vaine", "The Tree", "Out of the Deep", "The Creatures", "The Riddle", "The Vats"
- Ding Dong Bell (1924): "Lichen", "Benighted", "Strangers and Pilgrims", "Winter"
- Broomsticks and Other Tales (1925): "Pigtails, Ltd.", "The Dutch Cheese", "Miss Jemima", "The Thief", "Broomsticks", "Lucy", "A Nose", "The Three Sleeping Boys of Warwickshire", "The Lovely Myfanwy", "Maria-Fly", "Visitors"
- The Connoisseur and Other Stories (1926): "Mr Kempe", "Missing", "The Connoisseur". "Disillusioned", "The Nap", "Pretty Poll", "All Hallows", "The Wharf", "The Lost Track"
- On the Edge (1930): "A Recluse", "Willows", "Crewe", "At First Sight", "The Green Room", "The Orgy", "An Idyll", "The Picnic", "An Ideal Craftsman"
- The Dutch Cheese (1931) (editions illustrated by Dorothy P. Lathrop [1931] and Irene Hawkins [1947]) (children's stories)
- The Lord Fish (1933), illustrated by Rex Whistler (children's stories)
- The Walter de la Mare Omnibus (1933)
- The Wind Blows Over (1936): "What Dreams May Come", "Cape Race", "Physic", "The Talisman", "In the Forest", "A Froward Child", "Miss Miller", "The House", "A Revenant", "A Nest of Singing-Birds", "The Trumpet"
- The Nap and Other Stories (1936)
- Stories, Essays and Poems (1938)
- The Picnic and Other Stories (1941)
- The Best Stories of Walter de la Mare (1942)
- The Scarecrow and Other Stories (1945)
- Collected Stories for Children (1947) (editions illustrated by Irene Hawkins [1947] and Robin Jacques [1957])
- A Beginning and Other Stories (1955): "Odd Shop", "Music", "The Stranger", "Neighbours", "The Princess", "The Guardian", "The Face", "The Cartouche", "The Picture", "The Quincunx", "An Anniversary", "Bad Company", "A Beginning"
- Eight Tales (1971)
- Walter de la Mare, Short Stories 1895–1926 (1996): Collection comprising the contents of The Riddle and Other Stories, Ding Dong Bell and The Connoisseur and Other Stories, as well as "Kismet", "The Hangman Luck", "A Mote", "The Village of Old Age", "The Moon's Miracle", "The Giant", "De Mortuis", "The Rejection of the Rector", "The Match-Maker", "The Budget", "The Pear-Tree", "Leap Year", "Promise at Dusk", "Two Days in Town"
- Walter de la Mare, Short Stories 1927–1956 (2000): Collection comprising the contents of On the Edge, The Wind Blows Over and A Beginning and Other Stories, as well as "The Lynx", "A Sort of Interview", "The Miller's Tale", "A:B:O.", "The Orgy: An Idyll, Part II", "Late", "Pig", "Dr Iggatt"
- Walter de la Mare, Short Stories for Children (2006)

=== Poetry collections ===
- Songs of Childhood (1902)
- Poems (1906)
- The Listeners (1912)
- Peacock Pie (1913) (editions illustrated by W. Heath Robinson [1916], Claud Lovat Fraser [1924], Rowland Emett [1941] and Edward Ardizzone [1946])
- The Sunken Garden and Other Poems (1917)
- Motley and Other Poems (1918)
- The Veil and Other Poems (1921)
- Down-Adown-Derry: A Book of Fairy Poems (1922) (illustrated by Dorothy P. Lathrop)
- A Child's Day: A Book of Rhymes (1924) (illustrated by Winifred Bromhall)
- Selected Poems by Walter de la Mare (1927, 1931)
- Stuff and Nonsense and So On (1927) (editions illustrated by Bold [1927] and Margaret Wolpe [1946])
- This Year: Next Year (1937) (illustrated by Harold Jones)
- Bells and Grass (1941) (editions illustrated by Rowland Emett [1941] and Dorothy P. Lathrop [1942])
- Time Passes and Other Poems (1942)
- Inward Companion (1950)
- O Lovely England (1952)
- Walter de la Mare: The Complete Poems, ed. Giles de la Mare (1969)

Ariel Poems

Six poems were published by Faber and Faber as part of the Ariel Poems, for both series. They were the following:

- Alone (1927)
- Self to Self (1928)
- The Snowdrop (1929)
- News (1930)
- To Lucy (1931)
- The Winnowing Dream (1954)

=== Plays ===
- Crossings: A Fairy Play (1921) (book illustrated by Dorothy P. Lathrop (1923))

=== Nonfiction ===
- Some Women Novelists of the 'Seventies (1929)
- Desert Islands and Robinson Crusoe (1930)
- Lewis Carroll (1930)
- The Early Novels of Wilkie Collins (1932)
- Pleasures and Speculations (1940)
- Private View (1953)

=== Anthologies edited ===
- Come Hither (1923; new and revised edition, 1928; third edition, reset and printed from new plates, 1957)
- Tom Tiddler's Ground (1931; named after the children's game)
- Early One Morning, in the Spring: Chapters on Children and on Childhood As It Is Revealed in Particular in Early Memories and in Early Writings (1935)
- Behold, This Dreamer!: Of Reverie, Night, Sleep, Dream, Love-Dreams, Nightmare, Death, the Unconscious, the Imagination, Divination, the Artist, and Kindred Subjects (1939)
- Love (1943)

== Legacy ==
=== References in books ===
C. K. Scott Moncrieff, in translating Marcel Proust's seven-volume work Remembrance of Things Past, used the last line of de la Mare's poem "The Ghost" as the title of the sixth volume, The Sweet Cheat Gone (French: Albertine Disparu and La Fugitive).

In 1944 Faber and Faber and one of de la Mare's friends, a certain Dr Bett, arranged to secretly produce a tribute for his 75th birthday. This publication was a collaborative effort involving many admirers of Walter de la Mare's work, and included individual pieces by a variety of authors, including V. Sackville-West, J. B. Priestley, T. S. Eliot, Siegfried Sassoon, Lord Dunsany, and Henry Williamson.

Richard Adams's debut novel Watership Down (1972) uses several of de la Mare's poems as epigraphs.

De la Mare's play Crossings has an important role in Robertson Davies's novel The Manticore. In 1944, when the protagonist David Staunton is sixteen, de la Mare's play is produced by the pupils of his sister's school in Toronto. Staunton falls deeply in love with the girl playing the main role, a first love that has a profound effect on the rest of his life.

Symposium by Muriel Spark quotes de la Mare's poem "Fare Well": "Look thy last on all things lovely / Every hour."

=== References in music ===
Benjamin Britten set several of de la Mare's verses to music: de la Mare's version of the traditional song "Levy-Dew" in 1934, and five others, which were then collected in Tit for Tat.

Theodore Chanler used texts from de la Mare's story "'Benighted'" for his song cycle 8 Epitaphs.

== Collections ==
University College London holds a small archive of material relating to De la Mare which includes two letters to E.V. Hitchcock and two privately printed poems.

== See also ==
- The Queen's Book of the Red Cross
