= Thomas Handforth =

American artist (1897–1948)

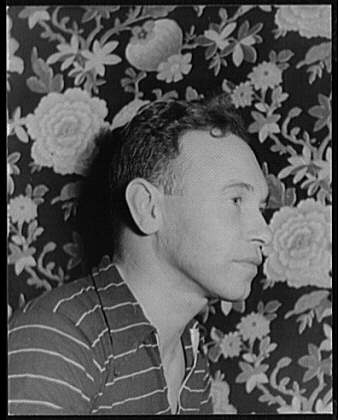
Thomas Handforth (1936) Photo by Carl Van Vechten

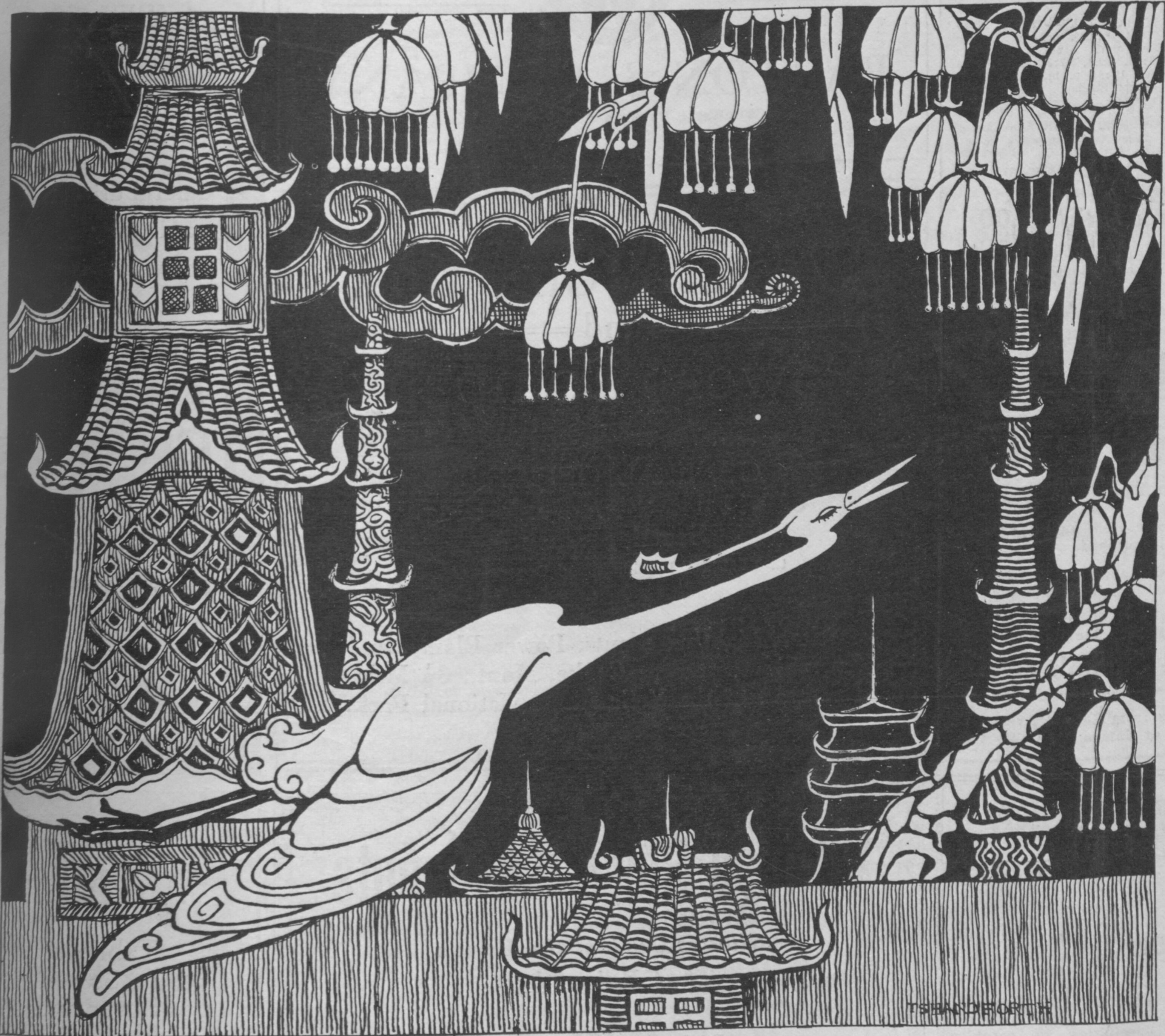
"The Jar of Myrrh and Incense" by Thomas Scofield Handford, circa 1916

Thomas Scofield Handforth (September 16, 1897 – October 19, 1948) was an American artist and etcher. He wrote and illustrated the children's picture book Mei Li based on personal experience in China and won the 1939 Caldecott Medal for illustration.

Mei Li is about a girl who escapes her traditional life in the Chinese countryside to visit a Chinese New Year fair. It has been reissued since 1938 and Handforth's magnificent drawings of China in the 1930s are still animated and compelling. In 1939, he was considered an expert on Asian art. Books he illustrated included in Sidonie, Totou in Bondage and Tranquilinas Paradise.

He was born in Tacoma, Washington, and studied art at the University of Washington. During World War I, he served in France with the anatomical unit in the Army's Sanitary Corps. He later studied art at L'Ecole des Beaux Arts in France. He lived in various locations, such as Paris, India, North Africa, Mexico, and China.
