= Train Advise Assist Command – South =

Train Advise Assist Command – South (TAAC – South)
- Active: October 2014 – 2021
- Country: USA
- Branch: Multifunctional
- Role: Training
- Garrison/HQ: Kandahar Airfield
- Website: TAAC – South

Train Advise Assist Command – South (TAAC – South) was a multinational military formation, part of NATO's Resolute Support Mission within Afghanistan. Prior to 2014 it was designated Regional Command South, under the International Security Assistance Force (ISAF).

It was responsible for provincial reconstruction and security in Zabul, Kandahar, Daykundi, and Uruzgan Province. Its primary Afghan National Army partners were the 205th Corps and the 404th Zone Police Corps. NATO countries contributing troops included Albania, Bulgaria, Canada, France, Lithuania, Netherlands, Poland, Romania, Slovakia, the United Kingdom, and the United States. Non-NATO countries contributing troops included Australia, New Zealand, and Singapore.

== Regional Command – South ==
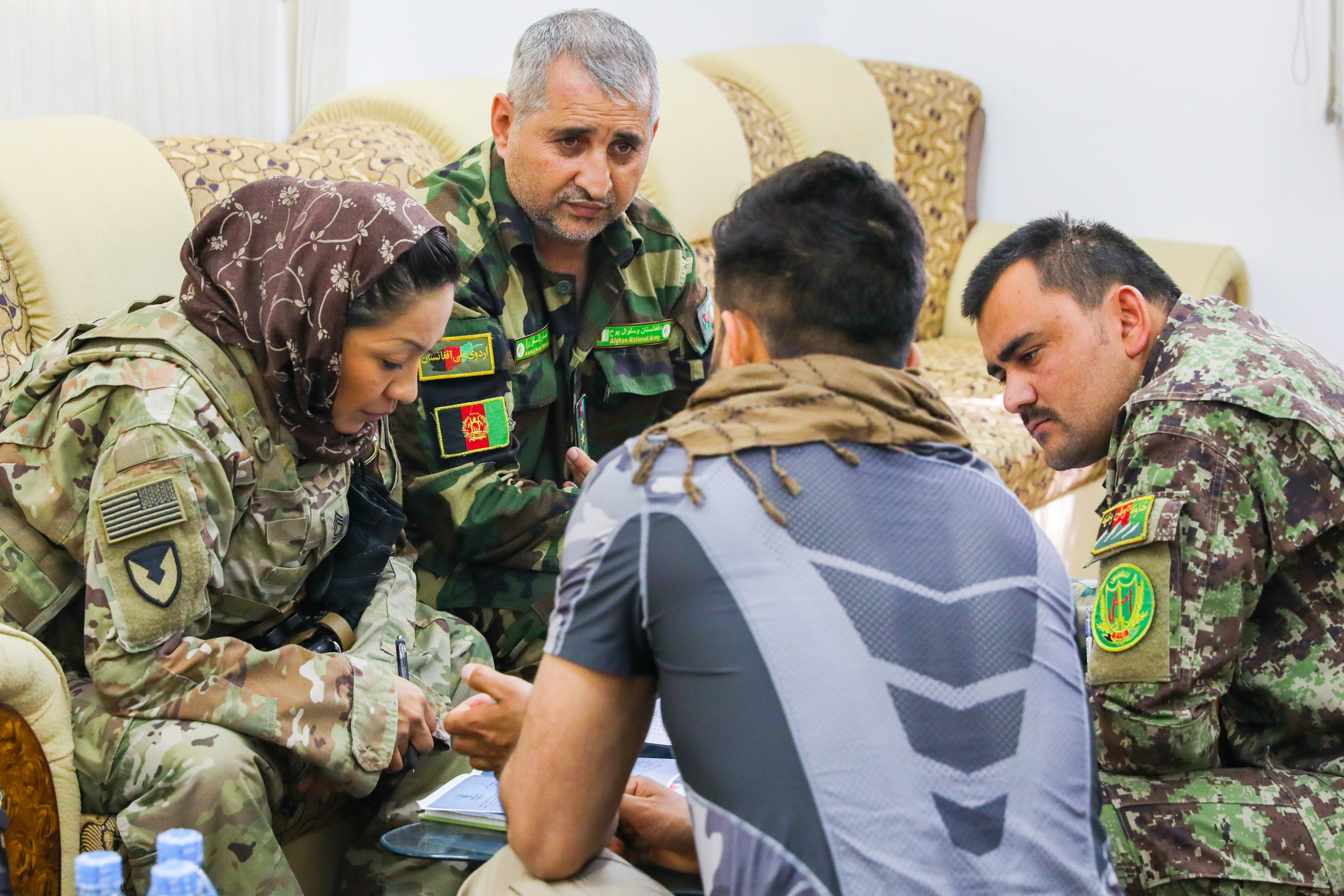
Master Sgt. Janet Bretado, logistics advisor for the Military Advisory Team, Train, Advise and Assist Command-South, meets with her Afghan counterparts, March 27, 2018, in Kandahar, Afghanistan. TAAC-South, composed of Soldiers from the 40th Infantry Division, California National Guard, and 2nd Infantry Brigade Combat Team, 4th Infantry Division, mission is to train and advice Afghan forces and assist with counterterrorism operations.

Prior to 2014, this command was known as Regional Command – South.

The command of the region previously rotated between Canada, the Netherlands, and the United Kingdom, but eventually was assumed solely by the United States. The headquarters was located at Kandahar International Airport next to the city of Kandahar. In 2010, the command's original territory was split into two commands, with the new Regional Command Southwest headquartered in Helmand Province.

- 28 February 2006: Canadian Brigadier-General David Fraser assumed Command of Regional Command South.
- 1 November 2006: Dutch Major-General Ton van Loon led Regional Command South in Afghanistan for a six months period.
- 1 May 2007: British Major-General Jacko Page
- 1 February 2008: Canadian Major-General Marc Lessard took command for a nine-month period.
- 1 November 2008: the Dutch Major-General Mart de Kruif took command of this region.
- 1 November 2009: British Major General Nick Carter took command. At this time, 6 (UK) Division, reorganised as Combined Joint Task Force 6, took over the headquarters function for the period of the British rotation. On 14 June 2010, RC(S) was split to create RC(S) and RC(SW). RC(SW) assumed control of the Helmand and Nimroz provinces.
- 1 November 2010: USA Major General James L. Terry, Commanding General, 10th Mountain Division, assumes command of Regional Command South. Headquarters 10th Mountain Division (LI) became HQ Combined Joint Task Force 10 for the deployment.
- 1 October 2011: USA Major General James L. Huggins, Commanding General, 82nd Airborne Division, assumes command of Regional Command South.
- 2 September 2012: USA Major General Robert B. Abrams, Commanding General, 3rd Infantry Division, U.S. Army, assumes command of Regional Command South. The 3rd Infantry Division became Combined Joint Task Force 3 for the deployment.
- 8 July 2013, USA Major General Paul LaCamera, Commanding General, 4th Infantry Division, assumes command of RC-S. Headquarters 4th Infantry Division became HQ Combined Joint Task Force 4 for the deployment.
- 7 July 2014, USA Major General Michael Bills, Commanding General, 1st Cavalry Division, assumes command of RC-S. Headquarters 1st Cavalry Division became HQ Combined Joint Task Force 1 for the deployment.

Three Provincial Reconstruction Teams (PRTs) operated in Regional Command South: Kandahar PRT, Kandahar province, led by the United States; Qalat PRT, Zabul province, led by the U.S. and supported by Romania and the U.K.; and Tarin Kot PRT, Uruzgan province, led by Australia.

== Train Advise Assist Command – South ==
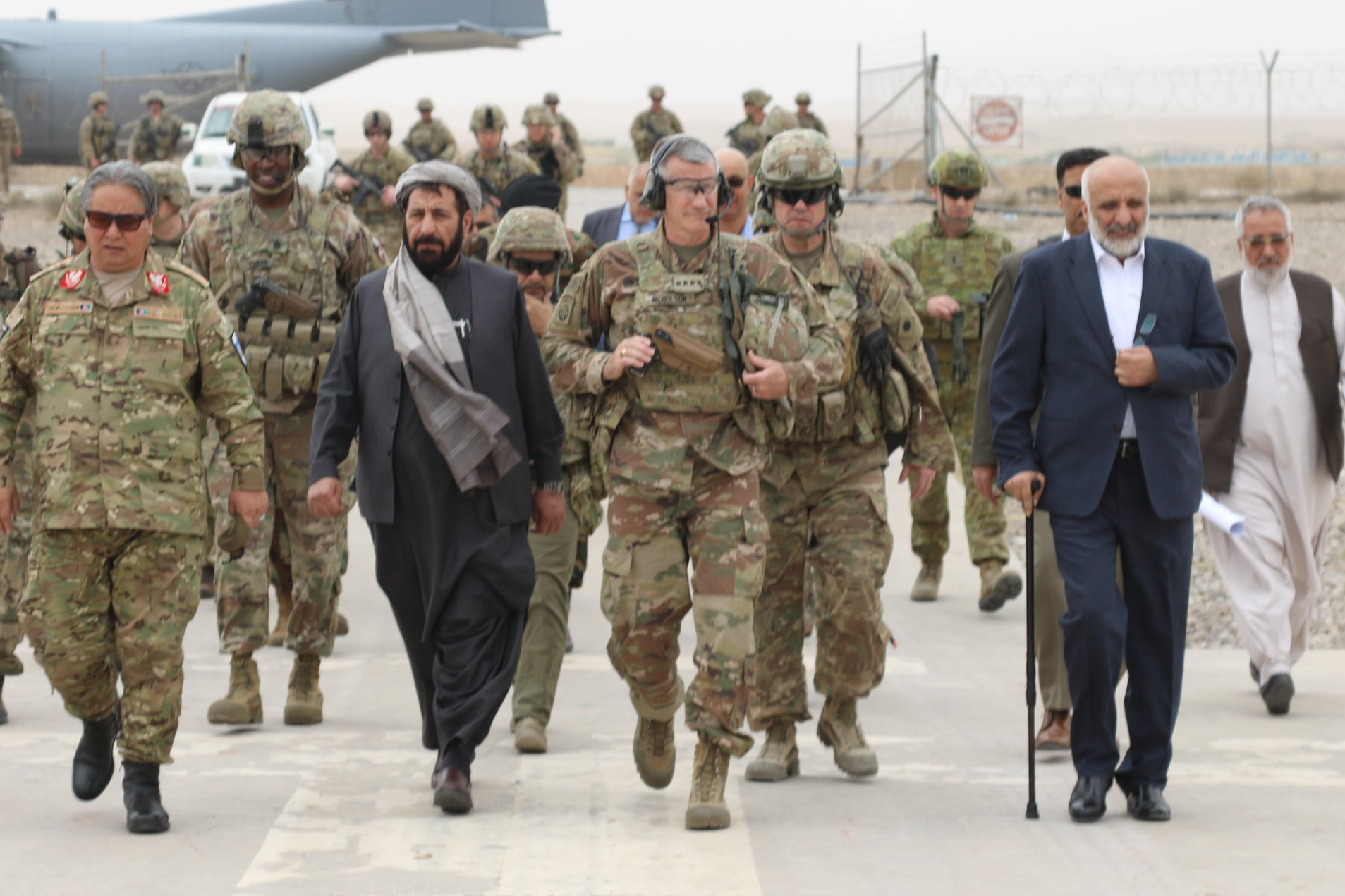
The Commander of Resolute Support, Gen. John Nicholson, visited Train, Advise, and Assist Command South to meet with Afghan leaders in the Uruzgan province regarding concerns over the security of provincial district voting registration centers in Tarin Kowt, 14 May. The meeting was hosted by TAAC-S under the command of Brig. Gen. John W. Lathrop with the 40th Infantry Division of the California National Guard.

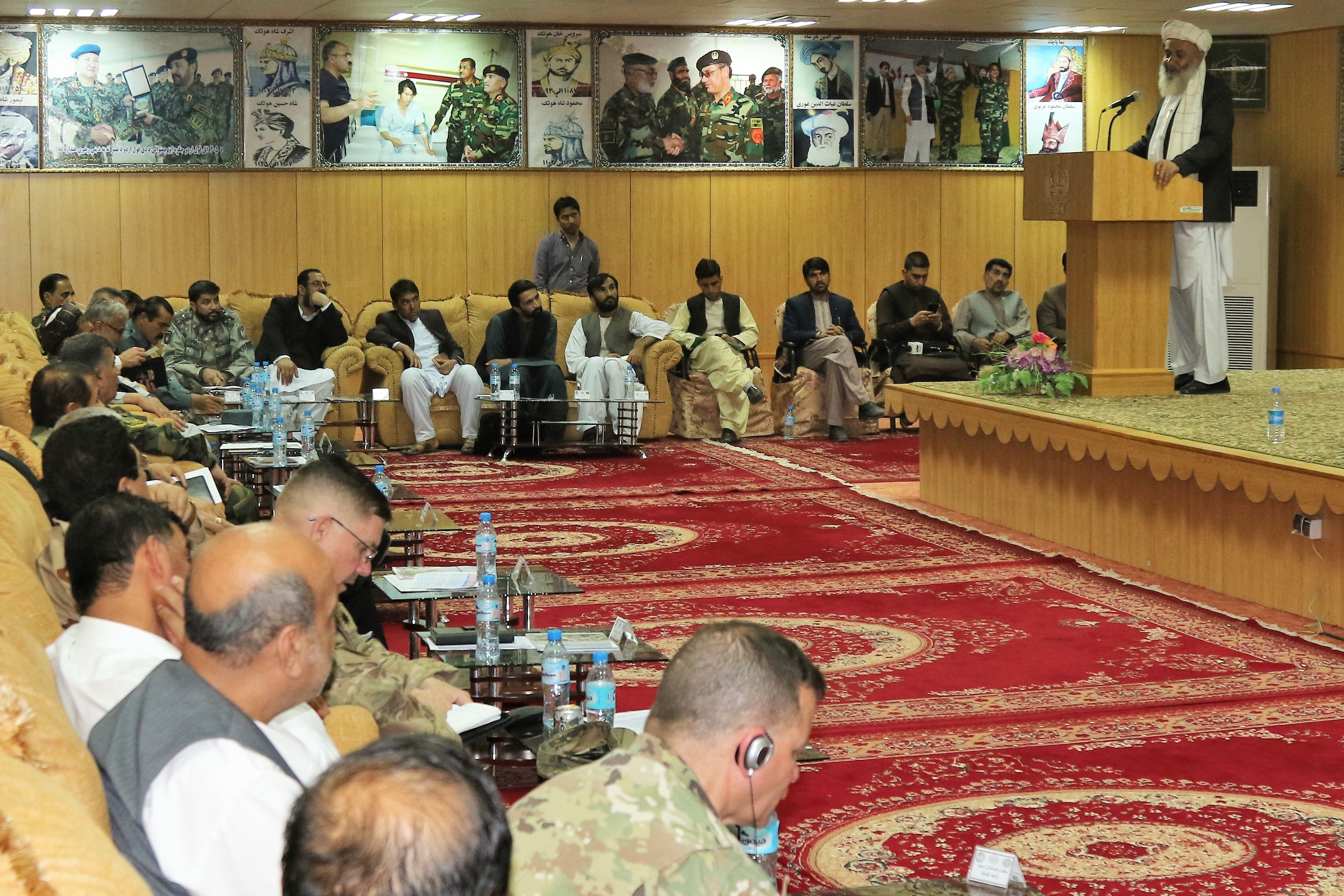
Afghan leaders from across the Train, Advise, and Assist Command South region came together to discuss details security during the upcoming 2018 elections. Attendees included the Provincial Governors and Chiefs of Police for Kandahar, Zabul, Uruzgan, and Daykundi, members of the Independent Election Commission, and the commanders of the 205th Corps of the Afghan National Defense and Security Forces, and 404th Zone of the Afghan National Police.

- 14 Oct 2014, USA Brigadier General Douglas Gabram, Commanding General, CJTF-1 of the 1st Cavalry Division, assumed responsibility for Train, Advise, Assist Command – South (TAAC-S), CJTF-1. At this time RC(S) became TAAC-S.
- 10 January 2015, USA Brigadier General Viet Luong, Commanding General, CJTF-1 of the 1st Cavalry Division, assumed responsibility for TAAC-S.
- 10 June 2015, USA Brigadier General Paul Bontrager, Commanding General, CJTF-7 (TF Bayonet) of the 7th Infantry Division, assumed responsibility for TAAC-S.
- 26 October 2015, USA Brigadier General Antonio Aguto, Commanding General, CJTF-7 (TF Bayonet) of the 7th Infantry Division, assumed responsibility for TAAC-S.
- 22 June 2016, USA Brigadier General Lee Henry, Commanding General, CJTF-36 (TF Arrowhead) of the 36th Infantry Division, assumed responsibility for TAAC-S. This was the first time a National Guard division command element assumed responsibility for a regional command within Afghanistan.
- 18 February 2017, USA Brigadier General Chuck K. Aris, Commanding General, CJTF-36 (TF Arrowhead) of the 36th Infantry Division, assumed responsibility for TAAC-S.
- 31 October 2017, USA Brigadier General John W. Lathrop, Commanding General, CJTF-40 (TF Sunburst) of the 40th Infantry Division, assumed responsibility for TAAC-S. This was the first time the 40th Infantry Division deployed to a combat theater since the Korean War.
- 30 June 2018, USA Brigadier General Jeffrey Smiley, Commanding General, CJTF-40 (TF Sunburst) of the 40th Infantry Division, assumed responsibility for TAAC-S.
- October 2018, Brigadier John Shanahan of the Australian Army assumed command of TAAC-S after General Smiley was wounded in action.
- 24 February 2019, Brigadier General Miles Brown assumed command.

== See also ==
- Train Advise Assist Command – Capital
- Train Advise Assist Command – North
- Train Advise Assist Command – East
- Train Advise Assist Command – West
- Train Advise Assist Command – Southwest
- Train Advise Assist Command – Southeast
- Train Advise Assist Command – Air
