= Mei Li =

1938 picture book by Thomas Handforth

- Original cover illustrated by Handforth
- Author: Thomas Handforth
- Illustrator: Thomas Handforth
- Genre: Children's picture book
- Publisher: Doubleday
- Publication date: 1938
- Publication place: United States

Mei Li (also called Mei Li's Chinese New Year) is a book by Thomas Handforth. Released by Doubleday, it was the second recipient of the Caldecott Medal for illustration in 1939. As one of the first American picture books to have an Asian protagonist, it is considered a milestone for diversity in children's fiction.

== Plot ==
This story is about a girl named Mei Li who ventures out to attend the Chinese New Year festivities with her brother San Yu and is burdened with the task to prove that there are activities for girls, too.

Awards
Preceded by Animals of the Bible	Caldecott Medal recipient 1939	Succeeded by Abraham Lincoln
