= The Fairy Circus =

The Fairy Circus is a children's book written and illustrated by Dorothy P. Lathrop. In this book, the fairies, enchanted by a human circus that visits their meadow, put on a circus of their own with the woodland creatures. First published in 1931, it was a Newbery Honor recipient in 1932.
