= Michael R. Fuljenz =

Numismatist, author, and businessman

Mike Fuljenz
- Born: Michael R. Fuljenz; August 7, 1954 (age 72); U.S.
- Occupations: Numismatist, author
- Years active: 1970s-present

Michael Ray Fuljenz (born August 7, 1954) is a numismatist, author, and businessman. He is currently the president of Universal Coin & Bullion, a precious metals trading company located in Beaumont, Texas.

== Early life ==
Fuljenz grew up in Lake Charles, Louisiana, the son of Raymond Fuljenz, an attorney and juvenile court prosecutor. Raymond introduced his son to the hobby of coin collecting. At age 12, Michael earned enough money to purchase his first uncirculated set of steel cents. He eventually became president of his local coin club and then Chairman of the Louisiana State Coin Convention. In the 1970s, Fuljenz became the editor of the Southwest Louisiana Coin Club. Shortly afterwards, he was chosen to write a column titled “Mike’s Musings” for Numismatic News.

== Early career ==
Fuljenz was initially a school teacher and then a principal. He then became the committee chairman of ANACS, the grading and authentication service of the ANA. From 1982–1998, Fuljenz taught classes for the American Numismatic Association (ANA) on counterfeit detection, coin grading, and gold and commemorative coinage.

== Business ==
Fuljenz is the president of Universal Coin & Bullion, a Beaumont, Texas company that buys and sells bullion and rare US coins.

== Board memberships ==
- 1995–present Board Member, Industry Counsel for Tangible Assets (ICTA)
- 1987-1989 Chairman, American Numismatic Association Certification Service
- 1983 Vice President, U.S. Commemorative Society
- 1974 Chairman, Louisiana Numismatic Association State Convention
- 1972-1975 President, Southwest Louisiana Coin Club

== Awards ==
Fuljenz has received 35 Numismatic Literary Guild awards in nine separate categories, including six awards in Investment “Book of the Year” categories and 13 awards for investment and collectable newspapers. His most current award (2023) was the NLG "Investment Book of the Year Award: Type Three Double Eagles 1877-1907, 3rd Edition"

== Books ==
Fuljenz is the author of four books about rare coins:

- Indian Gold Coins of the 20th Century, July 2010 ISBN 0-9819488-9-8
- Type III Double Eagles 1877-1907: A Numismatic History and Analysis, May 2009 ISBN 0-9819488-0-4
- Type II Double Eagles 1866-1876: A Numismatic History and Analysis, January 2008 ISBN 0-9652413-0-0
- The Collector’s Guide to $10 Indian Head Eagles: Indian Gold Coins of the 20th Century Volume One, January 2007
