= Collected Stories for Children =

1947 book by Walter de la Mare

- First edition
- Author: Walter de la Mare
- Illustrator: Irene Hawkins (1947); Robin Jacques (1957)
- Language: English
- Genre: Children's fantasy short stories, fairy tales
- Publisher: Faber and Faber
- Publication date: 1947
- Publication place: United Kingdom
- Media type: Print (hardback & paperback)
- Pages: 437 pp (first edition)
- OCLC: 53052613
- LC Class: PZ7.D3724 Co

Collected Stories for Children is a collection of 17 fantasy stories or original fairy tales by Walter de la Mare, first published by Faber in 1947 with illustrations by Irene Hawkins. De la Mare won the annual Carnegie Medal recognising the year's best children's book by a British subject. It was the first collection to win the award and the first time that previously published material had been considered.

== Stories ==
The collection comprises 17 stories.

- Dick and the Beanstalk: Dick discovers Jack's old beanstalk and climbs it to find the land of the giants, who have less than fond memories of Jack
- The Dutch Cheese: a stubborn young farmer offends the playful woodland fairies, and his sister has to negotiate with them for a peaceful life
- A Penny a Day: a dwarf helps a young girl with her household tasks, for a price
- The Scarecrow: an elderly man tells his niece of the time he saw a fairy perching on a scarecrow
- The Three Sleeping Boys of Warwickshire: three apprentice chimney-sweeps escape their cruel master in their dreams, but when he stops their souls returning to their bodies, they fall into an enchanted sleep which lasts for fifty-three years. This has been described as "the best of all modern short fairy-tales... a simple story but absorbing and beautifully told".
- The Lovely Myfanwy: a doting father keeps his lovely daughter in virtual imprisonment, but the rumour of her beauty spreads far and wide
- Lucy: three ageing sisters fall on hard times but the youngest finds she prefers her new life
- Miss Jemima: an old lady tells her granddaughter about the time long ago when she was very nearly enticed away by a fairy
- The Magic Jacket: a benevolent admiral gives the jacket which had brought him luck and success to a young pavement artist
- The Lord Fish: a lazy young man who loves fishing strays into a strange land where he meets a girl who is half-fish, and is turned into a fish himself
- The Old Lion: in Africa a sailor is given an extraordinary monkey who becomes a phenomenal success on the stage in London
- Broomsticks: an old lady becomes suspicious of her beloved cat
- Alice's Godmother: Alice's ancient godmother offers to share the secret of her long life
- The Maria-Fly: Maria has an unusual experience with a fly, but none of the people she tells about it understand what she felt
- Visitors: Tom sees some strange birds which change his life
- Sambo and the Snow Mountains: Sambo doses himself with every kind of medicine in his attempt to become white
- The Riddle: some children play with an old wooden chest although they have been warned to stay away

== Illustrations ==
Irene Hawkins was the original illustrator. She had illustrated several of the author's early collections and Muriel M. Green said in 1948 review of Collected Stories, "Mr de la Mare is especially fortunate in having found, in Irene Hawkins, an illustrator who can interpret his work so perfectly, and this volume is enhanced by her charming illustrations." For the 1957 edition new illustrations were commissioned from Robin Jacques, a highly regarded illustrator of fairy-tales. Marcus Crouch considers these line-drawings among Jacques' best work, artistically emphasising the homeliness of de la Mare's world.

== Literary significance and reception ==
In the decade after the First World War some of the best work for children was in poetry, fantasy and poetic fantasy, and there was a spate of original stories in the folk-tale manner. Walter de la Mare, primarily a poet, published several short books of such stories for children in the 1920s and 1930s, and the best of his tales were brought together in his Collected Stories for Children. The stories range over a variety of subjects, but all have the touch of tender, dream-like melancholy which is the hallmark of the author's work in general.

Roger Lancelyn Green described Walter de la Mare's stories as having a strong but very particular appeal: "These strange, homely tales of wonder captivate a limited audience – and are frequently foisted on children by adults who have fallen under their very real spell. It is a spell, however, and one of selective magic, catching some readers away into the true lands of enchantment, and boring others to distraction."

The award of the Carnegie Medal was unexpected, as none of the stories were new, but the collection was considered to give an opportunity for assessing and acknowledging "the achievement of the most gifted writer of the century who had dedicated his finest powers to delighting children".

== See also ==
Awards
Preceded by The Little White Horse	Carnegie Medal recipient 1947	Succeeded by Sea Change
