= Albany Charter half dollar =

American commemorative coin (1936)

- United States
- Value: 50 cents (0.50 US dollars)
- Mass: 12.5 g
- Diameter: 30.61 mm (1.20 in)
- Thickness: 2.15 mm (0.08 in)
- Edge: Reeded
- Composition: 90.0% silver; 10.0% copper
- Silver: 0.36169 troy oz
- Years of minting: 1936
- Mintage: 25,013 including 13 pieces for the Assay Commission (7,342 melted)
- Mint marks: None, all pieces struck at Philadelphia Mint without mint mark.

Obverse
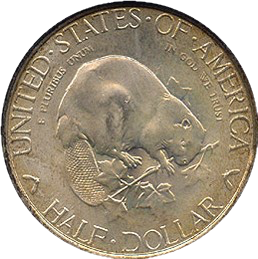
- Design: Beaver
- Designer: Gertrude K. Lathrop
- Design date: 1936

Reverse
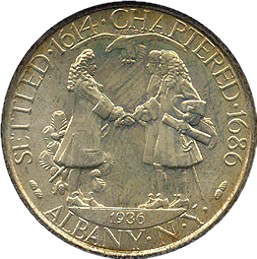
- Design: Thomas Dongan, Pieter Schuyler, and Robert Livingston
- Designer: Gertrude K. Lathrop
- Design date: 1936

The Albany Charter half dollar, also known as the Albany-Dongan half dollar or Albany half dollar, is a commemorative half dollar struck by the United States Bureau of the Mint in 1936. It was designed by sculptor Gertrude K. Lathrop, who lived in Albany, New York's state capital.

In 1936, Congress approved many commemorative coins for issuance, including some of mostly local significance. These included the Albany piece, wanted by city officials to mark the 250th anniversary of the 1686 grant of its municipal charter by Thomas Dongan, governor of colonial New York. The authorizing bill passed through Congress without opposition, though amendments added protections for coin collectors against abuses seen in earlier commemorative issues. Lathrop's designs have generally been praised: she placed a beaver on one side of the coin, modeled from life (one appears on Albany's city seal) and depicted the persons involved in the grant of the charter on the other. After approval of the designs by the Commission of Fine Arts, the Philadelphia Mint coined 25,013 Albany half dollars in October 1936, including 13 pieces for testing by the Assay Commission.

By the time of issuance, the demand for commemorative coins was falling, and the issue price of $2 was considered high. More than 7,000 were returned to the Mint in 1943, and a hoard of over 2,000 was sold by a local bank in 1954 at the original issue price. As of 2018, the Albany half dollar prices in the low hundreds of dollars, but the original packaging, if undamaged, may sell for more.

== Background ==
The first European to visit the site of Albany, New York, was the Englishman Henry Hudson in 1609. In 1624, the Dutch established Fort Orange there as a permanent settlement. The English took control of the area in 1664, but there remained Dutch property claims. In 1685, Fort Orange's name was changed to Albany, after James, Duke of Albany, the future James II. The following year, Pieter Schuyler and Robert Livingston went to New York City, the colonial capital of New York, to obtain a municipal charter for Albany from Governor Thomas Dongan. Schuyler became the first mayor of Albany; Livingston was made the clerk of the city and county of Albany and thus entitled to fees. The city became the capital of New York State in 1797.

Until 1954, the entire mintage of commemorative coin issues was sold by the government at face value to a group authorized by Congress, which then tried to sell the coins at a profit to the public. The new pieces then entered the secondary market; in early 1936 all earlier commemoratives sold at a premium to their issue prices. The apparent easy profits to be made by purchasing and holding commemoratives attracted many to the coin collecting hobby, where they sought to purchase the new issues. This led to many commemorative coin proposals in Congress, including some of purely local significance, such as the Albany half dollar. The group designated to purchase the Albany half dollar from the government was a committee to be established by Albany's mayor.

== Legislation ==
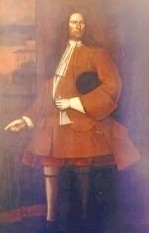
Portrait of Pieter Schuyler painted by Nehemiah Partridge between 1710 and 1718

Legislation for a commemorative half dollar in honor of the 250th anniversary of the founding of Albany (Note: The authorizing act spoke of the 250th anniversary of the founding of Albany, which was incorrect; the correct commemoration would have been for the 250th anniversary of the grant of the city charter.) was introduced into the House of Representatives on April 23, 1935, by Parker Corning of New York. It was referred to the Committee on Coinage, Weights, and Measures. On February 17, 1936, it was reported back to the House, with a recommendation that it pass after being amended. The amendment increased the authorized mintage from 10,000 half dollars to 25,000, and required that a committee of at least three people appointed by Albany's mayor be empowered to order the coins from the Mint (the original bill permitted an individual to have that power). Congressman Corning brought the bill to the House floor on March 25, and it passed without debate or opposition.

In the Senate, the bill was referred to the Committee on Banking and Currency on March 26, 1936. Only two weeks earlier, on March 11, a subcommittee of the Banking Committee led by Colorado's Alva B. Adams had examined abuses of commemorative coin issuers. The subcommittee had heard of the commemorative coin abuses of the time, when issuers often increased the number of coins needed for a complete set by having them issued at different mints with different mint marks; existing legislation placed no prohibition on this. Lyman W. Hoffecker, a Texas coin dealer and official of the American Numismatic Association, testified that some coins like the Oregon Trail Memorial half dollar, first struck in 1926, had been issued over the course of years with different dates and mint marks. Other issues had been entirely bought up by single dealers, and some low-mintage varieties of commemorative coins were selling at high prices. The many varieties and inflated prices for some issues that resulted from these practices angered coin collectors trying to keep their collections current.

Adams reported the Albany bill back to the Senate on May 21, 1936, with a proposed amendment. The amendment entirely rewrote the bill, imposing restrictions such as a one-year limit for issuance of the coins from the Mint after enactment of the bill, and that they be struck at only one of the mints. The bill was considered by the Senate on June 1, and the bill was amended and passed without discussion or dissent. As the two houses had not passed identical versions, the bill returned to the House of Representatives, where, on June 3, James M. Mead of New York moved that the House accept the Senate amendment; it did so without recorded discussion or dissent. The bill became law on June 16, 1936, with the signature of President Franklin D. Roosevelt, authorizing the minting of 25,000 half dollars. The law authorized the Albany committee to sell the half dollars at face value or at a premium, and required that the proceeds go to defray the cost of the anniversary celebrations.

== Preparation ==
On July 2, 1936, Albany's mayor, John B. Thacher, wrote to Director of the Mint Nellie Tayloe Ross advising her that he had appointed the legislatively mandated three-member committee (the Albany Dongan Charter Coin Committee), led by William L. Gillespie, the president of the National Commercial Bank and Trust Company. He stated that the city had commissioned Gertrude K. Lathrop, sculptor, to design the coin. Thacher indicated that Lathrop had come highly recommended by Buffalo nickel designer James Earle Fraser and others. He noted that Albany's anniversary celebrations would take place July 19 to 22 and wanted the new coins as soon thereafter as possible.

On September 2, Lathrop went to the offices of the Commission of Fine Arts (CFA), bringing the completed plaster models for the coin and a letter from its sculptor-member, Lee Lawrie, with her. The CFA was, by a 1921 executive order by President Warren G. Harding, charged with rendering advisory opinions regarding public artworks, including coins. Lawrie favored the designs in his letter, but was concerned that the letters in the word LIBERTY were too small, and would be lost when the models were reduced. Lathrop went to see Chief Engraver John R. Sinnock at the Philadelphia Mint, who said the word would still be visible, and stated that he thought the models would yield a "splendid coin". She also gained the support of Assistant Director of the Mint Mary M. O'Reilly. Lawrie reconsidered, and the models were approved by the CFA on September 9, 1936; the dies were completed later that month or in October.

== Design ==
The seal of Albany

The obverse of the half dollar depicts a beaver. Many of Albany's early settlers earned a living through the trade in beaver pelts, and the animal appears on the city's seal. Lathrop modeled the coin from a live beaver; one was lent to her for a few days at her studio by the New York State Department of Conservation. "[I]t is occasional contact with the interesting and friendly citizens of the wild that adds spice to one's work," Lathrop wrote. The beaver in Lathrop's design gnaws on a branch of maple, the New York state tree. Two maple keys, containing the seeds, are used to divide the name of the issuing country from the coin's denomination: they, as well as the pine cones that fulfill a similar function on the reverse, were meant by the sculptor to symbolize the growth and fertility of the community. The lumber industry was for many years a mainstay of Albany's economy. E PLURIBUS UNUM is to the beaver's left; IN GOD WE TRUST to its right.

The reverse depicts Schuyler and Livingston taking leave of Governor Dongan. Schuyler, soon to be mayor, holds his city's charter. Lathrop studied portraits of Schuyler and Livingston, though both paintings were made some 30 years after their trip from Albany to New York City. For Dongan, there is no known portrait, and Lathrop relied on the brief extant descriptions of the colonial governor. Lathrop was allowed access to the charter to measure and study it. She visited the Smithsonian and the Metropolitan Museum of Art while researching the men's clothing. A small pine tree is visible behind Governor Dongan; an eagle overspreads the group, with the small word LIBERTY above the bird. The designer's initials GKL are in small letters beside Dongan's foot.

Numismatic author Q. David Bowers wrote that the design "has always been considered pleasing by numismatists". David Bullowa, in his 1938 work on commemoratives, wrote, "every symbol and device on this issue has significance as connected with the early Colonial history of New York. The inscriptions have been reduced to a size that makes them almost unreadable. The word 'Liberty' on this coin, above the eagle, is microscopic." Art historian Cornelius Vermeule, in his volume on American coins and medals, deemed the Albany half dollar "an important contribution to American numismatics". He suggested that the beaver, a symbol of Albany, gnawing the maple branch, a symbol of New York State, "would then seem to become an allegory of municipal government feeding on the rule of the state!" Given the complexity of the reverse, he stated, "that the coin as a whole has considerable appeal can be counted as a credit to the good training and innate taste of the artist, who was able to work in all these allusions to local aspirations and a bygone event with modest, positive precision."

== Minting, distribution and collecting ==
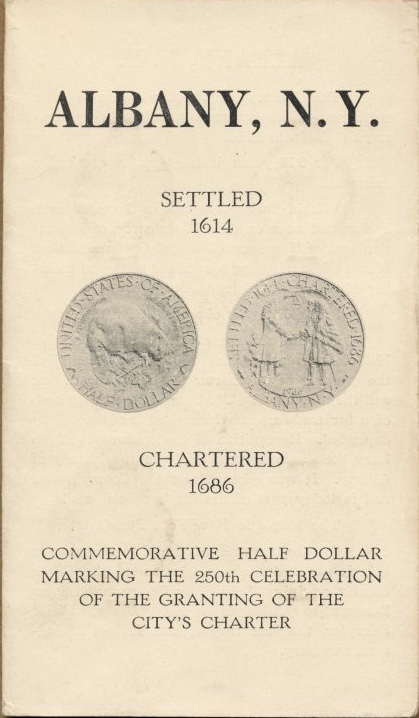
Front cover of coin holder in which the half dollars were sent to purchasers

A total of 25,013 Albany half dollars were struck at the Philadelphia Mint during October 1936, including 13 pieces set aside to be available for inspection and testing at the 1937 meeting of the annual Assay Commission. They were sold by the Albany Dongan Charter Coin Committee for $2 each. The price was considered high for the time (a more usual price for a new issue then would be $1 or $1.50). Additionally, the commemorative coin mania that had been sweeping the country in the spring and summer of 1936 had already seen close to twenty other commemorative coins issued that same year, and had abated by the time the Albany piece was available. Sales were thus unexpectedly low. The Albany Dongan Committee continued to sell the coins until 1943, refusing to lower the public price, though the entire remaining stock was offered to New York City coin dealer Abe Kosoff at face value plus $50. He declined, unwilling to buy them all himself and unable to find backers for a syndicate to purchase them.

The committee wrote to O'Reilly in February 1937, wanting to know the procedure for returning unsold coins, and in 1943, with sales at a standstill, it returned 7,342 pieces for redemption and melting, leaving 17,658 specimens extant. The retail price from coin dealers of the Albany half dollar in uncirculated condition dropped as low as $1.50 in 1940, recovering to $4 in 1950. In 1954 it became known that the State Bank of Albany had some 2,000 Albany half dollars in its vaults and was willing to sell them for the original issue price of $2. They sold to several local collectors and dealers. At the time, the market price was $8.

By 1970, the market price was $80 and by 1985, $400. As of 2009, the coin could fetch $330 for an uncirculated coin rated as MS-60, and $470 for an MS-65. The deluxe edition of R. S. Yeoman's A Guide Book of United States Coins, published in 2018, lists the piece for between $220 and $425, depending on condition. An exceptional specimen sold for $20,125 in 2004.

The original packaging, which is rarer than the half dollar itself, included a four-page booklet containing an illustration of the coin, a history of Albany, and slots for one to five coins. Both the booklet and the envelope it came in are highly collectible. Even scarcer are boxes designed to hold single coins and inscribed with "The National Commercial Bank and Trust Company of Albany". Numismatic author Anthony Swiatek, in his 2012 volume on commemoratives, values the holder at between $75 and $125, increased with the original envelope to between $125 and $175. The boxes have sold for between $350 and $3,000, depending on condition.

== See also ==
- Early United States commemorative coins

== Sources ==
- Bowers, Q. David (1992). Commemorative Coins of the United States: A Complete Encyclopedia. Wolfeboro, NH: Bowers and Merena Galleries, Inc. ISBN 978-0-943161-35-8.
- Bullowa, David M. (1938). "The Commemorative Coinage of the United States 1892–1938". Numismatic Notes and Monographs (83). New York: American Numismatic Society: i–192. JSTOR 43607181. (subscription required)
- Duffield, Frank (uncredited) (November 1936). "The designs of the Albany half dollar". The Numismatist: 909–910.
- Flynn, Kevin (2008). The Authoritative Reference on Commemorative Coins 1892–1954. Roswell, GA: Kyle Vick. OCLC 711779330.
- Slabaugh, Arlie R. (1975). United States Commemorative Coinage (second ed.). Racine, WI: Whitman Publishing. ISBN 978-0-307-09377-6.
- Swiatek, Anthony (2012). Encyclopedia of the Commemorative Coins of the United States. Chicago: KWS Publishers. ISBN 978-0-9817736-7-4.
- Swiatek, Anthony; Breen, Walter (1981). The Encyclopedia of United States Silver & Gold Commemorative Coins, 1892 to 1954. New York: Arco Publishing. ISBN 978-0-668-04765-4.
- Taxay, Don (1967). An Illustrated History of U.S. Commemorative Coinage. New York: Arco Publishing. ISBN 978-0-668-01536-3.
- United States Senate Committee on Banking and Currency (March 11, 1936). Coinage of commemorative 50-cent pieces. United States Government Printing Office.
- Vermeule, Cornelius (1971). Numismatic Art in America. Cambridge, MA: The Belknap Press of Harvard University Press. ISBN 978-0-674-62840-3.
- Yeoman, R. S. (2018). A Guide Book of United States Coins (Mega Red 4th ed.). Atlanta, GA: Whitman Publishing, LLC. ISBN 978-0-7948-4580-3.
