= Lathrop Township, Clinton County, Missouri =

Township in Clinton County, Missouri, U.S.

Lathrop Township
- Township
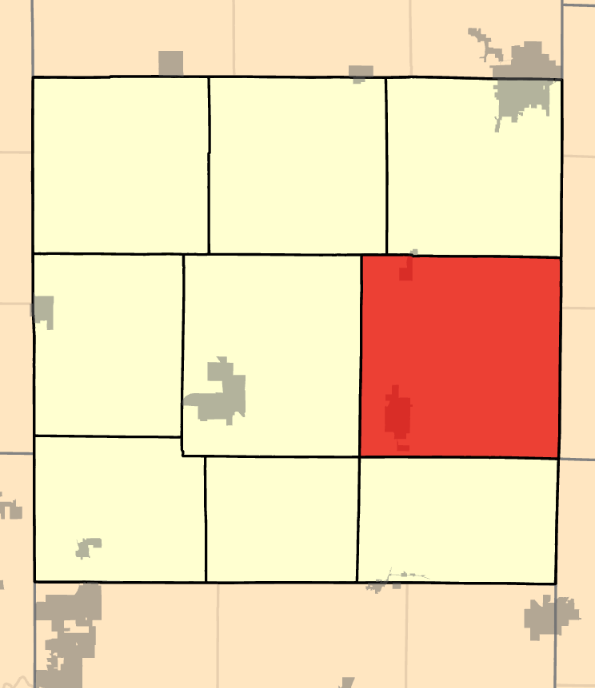
- Coordinates: 39°35′35″N 94°16′19″W
- Country: United States
- State: Missouri
- County: Clinton

Area
  - Total: 63.88 sq mi (165.4 km^{2})
  - Land: 63.74 sq mi (165.1 km^{2})
  - Water: 0.14 sq mi (0.36 km^{2}) 0.22%
- Elevation: 1,043 ft (318 m)

Population (2020)
  - Total: 3,324
  - Density: 52.2/sq mi (20.2/km^{2})
- FIPS code: 29-04940844
- GNIS feature ID: 766517

Lathrop Township is a township in Clinton County, Missouri, United States. At the 2020 census, its population was 3,324.

Lathrop Township was established in 1867.
