= Eight Tales =

- Dust-jacket by Gary Gore.
- Author: Walter de la Mare
- Cover artist: Gary Gore
- Language: English
- Genre: Fantasy, horror
- Publisher: Arkham House
- Publication date: 1971
- Publication place: United States
- Media type: Print (hardback)
- Pages: xx, 108

Eight Tales is a collection of stories by British writer Walter de la Mare. It was released in 1971 and was the author's first collection of stories published by Arkham House. It was published in an edition of 2,992 copies. The stories were all written under de la Mare's pseudonym "Walter Ramal" and had not appeared previously in book form.

== Contents ==
Eight Tales contains an introduction, by Edward Wagenknecht, and the following stories:

1. "Kismet"
2. "The Hangman Luck"
3. "A Mote"
4. "The Village of Old Age"
5. "The Moon's Miracle"
6. "The Giant"
7. "De Mortuis"
8. "A:B:O."

== Sources ==
- Jaffery, Sheldon (1989). The Arkham House Companion. Mercer Island, Washington: Starmont House, Inc. p. 99. ISBN 1-55742-005-X.
- Chalker, Jack L.; Mark Owings (1998). The Science-Fantasy Publishers: A Bibliographic History, 1923-1998. Westminster, Maryland and Baltimore: Mirage Press, Ltd. p. 48.
- Joshi, S. T. (1999). Sixty Years of Arkham House: A History and Bibliography. Sauk City, Wisconsin: Arkham House. p. 124. ISBN 0-87054-176-5.
- Nielsen, Leon (2004). Arkham House Books: A Collector's Guide. Jefferson, North Carolina, and London: McFarland & Company, Inc. p. 113. ISBN 0-7864-1785-4.
