= John W. Lathrop =

United States Army general

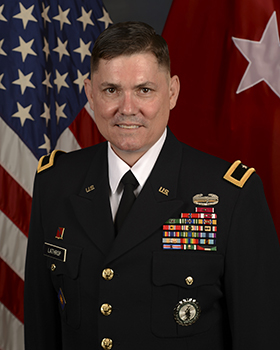
- Brig. Gen. John W. Lathrop, commanding general, Train, Advise, and Assist Command South
- Military career
- Allegiance: United States of America
- Branch: California Army National Guard
- Service years: 1986–present
- Rank: Brigadier general
- Unit: Train, Advise, and Assist Command South
- Commands: Train, Advise, and Assist Command South; Land Component Command, Los Alamitos, California; 115th Regional Support Group, Roseville, California; Detachment 5 State Area Command, Recruiting and Retention, Sacramento, California; A Battery, 3rd Battalion, 144th Field Artillery, 40th Infantry Division (Mechanized), Bakersfield, California
- Awards: Defense Superior Service Medal Legion of Merit (3); Bronze Star Medal (2)

John W. Lathrop (born October 17, 1963) was a brigadier general in the California Army National Guard who served as the commanding general of Train, Advise, and Assist Command South. He is a 1986 graduate of the University of California, Riverside, where he earned a Bachelor of Arts in public service and political science. He was commissioned through the Claremont College Reserve Officer Training Program, where he received an appointment into the Active Component. During his more than 32 years of active and reserve service, he has held command and staff positions across the Army, Reserves, and Joint Community in Korea, the United States, and Southwest Asia. He assumed his current assignment in October, 2017. He retired from service on December 31, 2018.

== Assignments ==
Lathrop's tours of duty with warfighting units include the 2nd Infantry Division and 75th Field Artillery Brigade as a lieutenant; the 40th Corps Support Group as a colonel, and Train, Advise, and Assist Command South as a brigadier general. His joint experience includes serving as the commander for Train, Advise, and Assist Command South, USCENTCOM, Afghanistan.

== Commands ==
Brigadier General Lathrop has commanded at every level from company through divisional command. His first command was of A Battery, 3rd Battalion, 144th Field Artillery, 40th Infantry Division. Lathrop's next command assignment was at battalion level, at Detachment 5 State Area Command, Recruiting and Retention in Sacramento, California.

Later, Lathrop served as commander of the 115th Regional Support Group in Roseville, California, as commander of the Land Component Command, Los Alamitos, California, and the commanding general of Train, Advise, and Assist Command South, Afghanistan.

== Operational assignments ==
Brig. Gen. Lathrop has extensive operational experience, having served as a commander in Afghanistan and deputy commander in Iraq. Lathrop has also served as an ammunition platoon leader in Southwest Asia and a fire direction officer and recon/survey officer in the Republic of South Korea.

== Education ==
Brig. Gen. Lathrop holds a Bachelor of Public Service and Political Science degree from the University of California, Riverside, and Master of Management from the University of Redlands.

His military schooling includes Syracuse University, National Security Studies Management Course; National Guard Professional Education Center, Strategic Planning and Management Course; United States Army Logistics Management College, Sustainment Pre Command Course; and the Fletcher School of Law and Diplomacy, Senior Service College.

== Awards and decorations ==
| |Distinguished Service Medal

| |Defense Superior Service Medal

|

|Legion of Merit with two bronze oak leaf clusters

| |Bronze Star Medal with one bronze oak leaf cluster

|

|Meritorious Service Medal with one silver and one bronze oak leaf cluster

|

|Army Commendation Medal with one silver and one bronze oak leaf cluster |-

|

|Army Achievement Medal with two bronze oak leaf clusters |-

|

|Army Reserve Components Achievement Medal with three bronze oak leaf clusters |-

|

|National Defense Service Medal with one bronze service star |-

|

|Southwest Asia Service Medal with two bronze campaign stars |- | |Iraq Campaign Medal with two campaign stars |- | |Global War on Terrorism Service Medal |- || |Korean Defense Service Medal |- || |Humanitarian Service Medal |- || |Armed Forces Reserve Medal with silver hourglass and M device |- | |Army Service Ribbon |- | |Army Overseas Service Ribbon with bronze award numeral 4 |- | |Army Reserve Component Overseas Training Ribbon with numeral 3 device |- | |Kuwait Liberation Medal (Saudi Arabia) |- | |Kuwait Liberation Medal (Kuwait) |- | |Combat Action Badge |- | |Recruiter Basic Badge |}

Military offices
| Preceded by BG Chuck K. Aris | Commanding general of Train, Advise, and Assist Command – South; 2017–2018 | Succeeded by BG Jeff Smiley |
