= Ida Pulis Lathrop =

American painter

- Born: Ida F. Pulis; October 27, 1859; Troy, New York, U.S.
- Died: September 7, 1937 (aged 77); Albany, New York, U.S.
- Known for: Painting

Ida F. Pulis Lathrop (1859–1937) was an American painter. She primarily worked on portraits, still life and landscapes as subjects. Lathrop was based in Albany, New York.

== About ==
She was born on October 27, 1859, as Ida F. Pulis in Troy, New York to Catherine Sheffér, who took in boarders, and Abraham William Pulis, who worked as a carpenter. Her family also had a shop. She married Cyprus Clark Lathrop in 1885. Together they had two daughters that became artists, Gertrude K. Lathrop, and Dorothy P. Lathrop. Ida Pullis Lathrop was a self-taught artist. She was mostly known for her still-lives and portraits, however she also painted landscapes.

Her first exhibit was at the Academy of Design in New York City and garnered nationwide wide fame by the early 1900s.

She died on September 7, 1937, in her home in Albany, she is buried in Albany Rural Cemetery.

Lathrop has work in the museum collection at Albany Institute of History and Art, Smithsonian American Art Museum, among others.
