= Dorothy P. Lathrop =

American writer and illustrator (1891–1980)

- Born: April 16, 1891; Albany, New York, US
- Died: December 30, 1980 (aged 89)
- Education: Teachers College, Columbia University; Pennsylvania Academy of Fine Arts; Art Students League
- Occupation: Book illustrator/author

Dorothy Pulis Lathrop (April 16, 1891 – December 30, 1980) was an American writer and illustrator of children's books.

== Biography ==
Dorothy Pulis Lathrop was born in Albany, New York, April 16, 1891 to Ida Pulis Lathrop and Cyprus Clark Lathrop. Her sister was artist Gertrude K. Lathrop.

During a prolific career spanning from 1919 to 1967, she used her artistic skills as an illustrator of other authors’ children's fictional literature: more than 38 books were published with her illustrations. Lathrop wrote and illustrated nine children's books and several topical nonfiction books. She was also an accomplished printmaker. Much of her work was devoted to the beauty and importance of animals.

Frontispiece to Walter de la Mare's Book of Fairies

Lathrop's career began around 1919, when her first published suite of illustrations appeared in Walter de la Mare's book for children, The Three Mulla-Mulgars. Lathrop developed a friendship with de la Mare, and thereafter illustrated five more of his books for children: Down-Adown-Derry (1922), Crossings (1923), The Dutch Cheese (1931), Mr. Bumps and His Monkey (1942) and Bells and Grass (1942).

In 1929, Lathrop illustrated Rachel Field's successful children's novel, Hitty, Her First Hundred Years, the fictional story of a doll, which won the Newbery Medal, awarded by the American Library Association for the best children's novel of the year. In 1931, Lathrop wrote The Fairy Circus, which was a runner-up for the Newbery Medal. In 1938, Lathrop's illustrations for Animals of the Bible, written by Helen Dean Fish, won her the inaugural Caldecott Medal, awarded for the year's "most distinguished American picture book for children".

Lathrop illustrated many other books, particularly fantasy and fairy tales such as W. H. Hudson's Little Boy Lost; Hans Christian Andersen's The Little Mermaid; Hilda Conkling's Silverhorn; George MacDonald's The Princess and Curdie and The Light Princess; Jean Ingelow's Mopsa the Fairy and her self-authored The Lost Merry-Go-Round and The Colt from Moon Mountain.

She illustrated several collections of children's poetry including work by Walter de la Mare and Sara Teasdale's Stars To-night.

In 1949, she was elected into the National Academy of Design as an Associate Academician.

== Legacy ==
Lathrop's artwork for Stars To-Night: Verses New and Old for Boys and Girls is featured on the cover of the Animal Collective album Spirit They're Gone, Spirit They've Vanished.

Lathrop's work is included in museum permanent collections including the Metropolitan Museum of Art, Williams College Museum of Art, Huntsville Museum of Art, among others.

== Works ==
Books illustrated by Lathrop:

- Hudson, W. H. (1920). A Little Lost Boy. Dorothy Lathrop (illustrator). Alfred A. Knopf, Inc.
- An Angel in the Woods. Lathrop, Dorothy P. (author), Macmillan, 1947.
- Animals of the Bible. Lathrop, Dorothy (author), Lippincott, 1937. - Winner of the 1938 Caldecott Medal
- Balloon Moon. Cabot, Elsie (author), Henry Holt, 1927.
- Bells and Grass. De La Mare, Walter (author), Viking, 1965.
- Bouncing Betsy. Lathrop, Dorothy P. (author), Macmillan, 1936.
- Branches Green. Field, Rachel (author), Macmillan, 1934.
- Childcraft in 15 Volumes. Lathrop, Dorothy P. et al. (author), Field Educational Pub., 1954.
- Crossings: A Fairy Play. De La Mare, Walter (author), Knopf, 1923.
- Devonshire Cream. Dean, Agnes L. (author), Unity Press, 1950.
- Down-Adown-Derry: A Book of Fairy Poems. De La Mare, Walter (author), Henry Holt, 1922.
- Fierce-Face: The Story of a Tiger. Mukerji, Dhan Gopal (author), Dutton, 1938.
- Follow the Brook. Lathrop, Dorothy P. (author), Macmillan, 1960.
- Grateful Elephant. Burlingame, Eugene W. (author), Yale University Press, 1923.
- Grim: The Story of a Pike. Fleuron, Svend (author), Knopf, 1921.
- Hide and Go Seek. Lathrop, Dorothy (author), E.M. Hale, 1938.
- Hitty: Her First Hundred Years. Field, Rachel (author), Macmillan, 1947.
- Kaleidoscope. Farjeon, Eleanor (author), Stokes, 1929.
- Japanese Prints. Fletcher, John Gould (author), Four Seas Press, Boston, 1918.
- Let Them Live. Lathrop, Dorothy P. (author), Macmillan, 1961.
- Made-To-Order Stories. Canfield, Dorothy (author), Harcourt Brace, 1953.
- Mopsa the Fairy. Ingelow, Jean (author), Harper & Brothers, 1927.
- Mr. Bumps and His Monkey. De La Mare, Walter (author), Winston, 1942.
- Presents for Lupe. Lathrop, Dorothy P. (author), Macmillan, 1940.
- Puffy and the Seven Leaf Clover. Lathrop, Dorothy P. (author), Macmillan, 1954.
- Puppies for Keeps. Lathrop, Dorothy (author), Macmillan, 1944.
- Silverhorn: The Hilda Conkling Book For Other Children. Conkling, Hilda (author), Stokes, 1924.
- Stars To-Night: Verses New and Old for Boys and Girls. Teasdale, Sara (author), Macmillan, 1930.
- Sung under the Silver Umbrella. Education Association For Childhood (author), Macmillan, 1935.
- Tales From The Enchanted Isles. Gate, Ethel May (author), Yale University Press, 1926.
- The Colt from Moon Mountain. Lathrop, Dorothy P. (author), Macmillan, 1941.
- The Dog in the Tapestry Garden. Lathrop, Dorothy P. (author), Macmillan, 1962.
- The Dutch Cheese. De La Mare, Walter (author), Knopf, 1931.
- The Fair of St. James. Farjeon, Eleanor (author), Stokes, 1932.
- The Fairy Circus. Lathrop, Dorothy P. (author), Macmillan, 1931.
- The Forgotten Daughter. Snedeker, Caroline Dale (author), Doubleday, 1933.
- The Happy Flute. Mandal, Sant Ram (author), Stokes, 1939.
- The Light Princess. Macdonald, George (author), Macmillan, 1952.
- The Little Mermaid. Andersen, Hans (author), Macmillan, 1939.
- The Little White Goat. Lathrop, Dorothy P. (author), Macmillan, 1935.
- The Littlest Mouse. Lathrop, Dorothy P. (author), Macmillan, 1955.
- The Long Bright Land. Howes, Edith (author), Little Brown, 1929.
- The Lost Merry-Go-Round. Lathrop, Dorothy P. (author), Macmillan, 1938.
- The Princess and Curdie. MacDonald, George (author), Macmillan, 1927.
- The Skittle Skattle Monkey. Lathrop, Dorothy P. (author), Macmillan, 1945.
- The Snail Who Ran. Lathrop, Dorothy P. (author), Stokes, 1934.
- The Snow Image. Hawthorne, Nathaniel (author), Macmillan, 1930.
- The Three Mulla-Mulgars. De La Mare, Walter (author), Knopf, 1919.
- Treasure of Carcassonne. Robida, A. (author), E.M. Hale, 1926.
- Who Goes There? Lathrop, Dorothy P. (author), Macmillan, 1935
