= Gertrude K. Lathrop =

American sculptor (1896–1986)

- Born: December 24, 1896; Albany, New York, U.S.
- Died: March 16, 1986 (aged 89); Falls Village, Connecticut, U.S.
- Education: Art Students League of New York; School of American Sculpture
- Occupations: Sculptor, medalist
- Known for: New Rochelle 250th Anniversary half dollar
- Mother: Ida Pulis Lathrop
- Relatives: Dorothy P. Lathrop (sister)

Gertrude Katherine Lathrop (December 24, 1896 – March 16, 1986) was an American sculptor known for her medallion work and sculptures of small animals.

== Biography ==
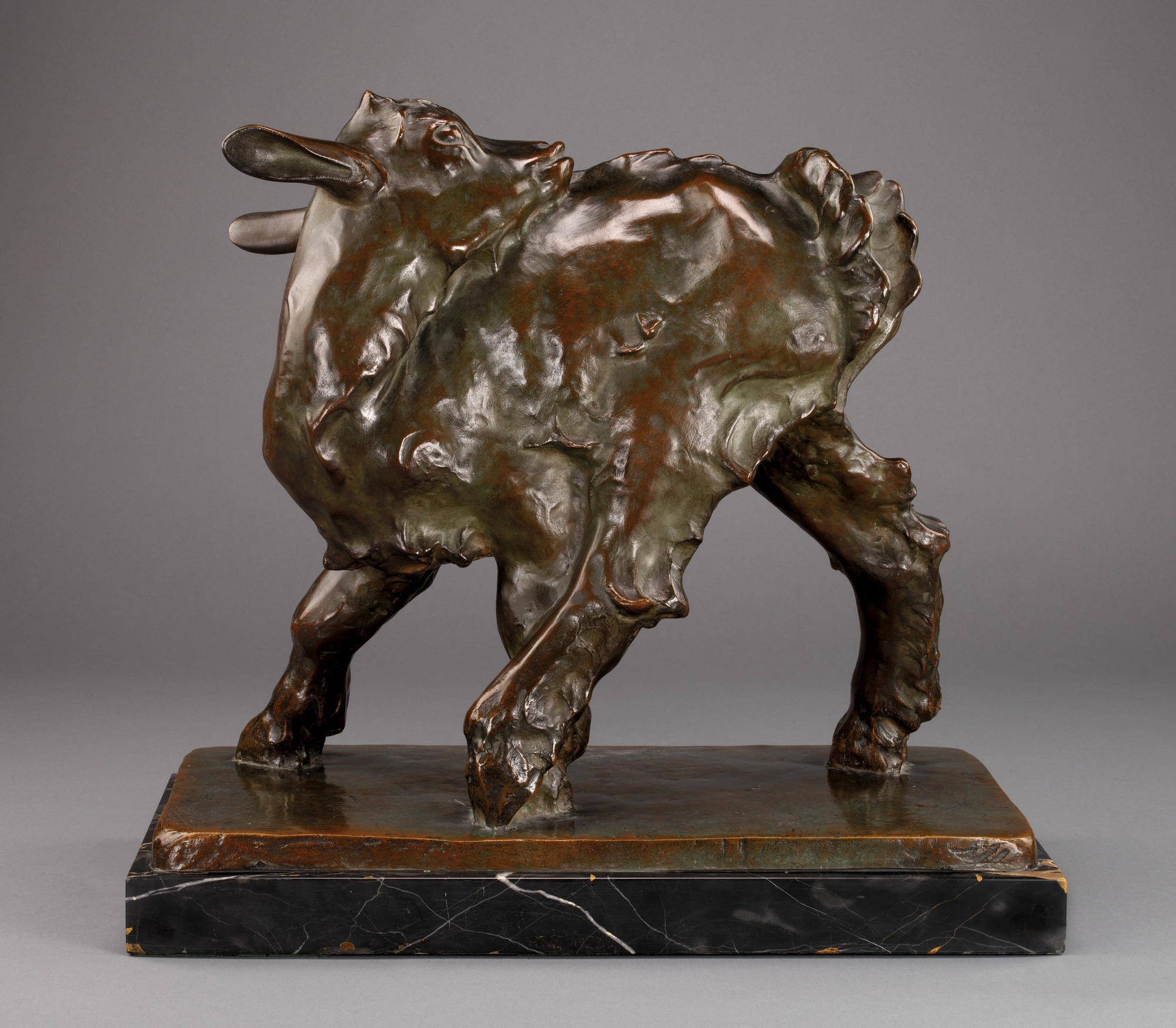
Nancy Lee (1922) is a bronze sculpture of a goat calf by Gertrude K. Lathrop.

=== Early life and education ===
Lathrop was born in Albany, New York to artist Ida Pulis Lathrop and Cyrus Clark Lathrop. Her sister Dorothy P. Lathrop was an artist too.

She studied at Art Students League in 1918 with Gutzon Borglum and at the School of American Sculpture, also with Borglum.

=== Career ===
Her first exhibition was in the National Academy of Design in 1921. In 1924, she went to Gloucester, Massachusetts to study with Charles Grafly.

She was awarded an Honorable Mention from the Art Institute of Chicago, in 1924, as well as the Helen Foster Barnett prize and the National Academy of Design, both in 1928.

She designed the Albany Charter half dollar in 1936, and was engaged by Westchester County Coin Club of New Rochelle, New York to design the New Rochelle 250th Anniversary half dollar in 1938.

She was awarded the Allied Artists of America's Medal of Honor in 1964. Three years later, in 1967, she was awarded the Pen and Brush Club's silver medal. In 1970, she won the John Sanford Saltus Gold Medal from the British Numismatic Society.

She was an accomplished medalist and modeled for portraits, but her main passion was sculpting animals. She said of it, "I chose to model animals because of their infinite variety of form and texture and their great beauty, for even the lowliest of them have beauty, yes even the ward bug, with his magnificent tusks."

In 1954, she moved with her sister, who was a noted illustrator of children's books, to Falls Village, Connecticut, where she would live for the rest of her life.

== Collections ==
Her work is included in the collections of the Seattle Art Museum, the Smithsonian American Art Museum, the National Gallery of Art, Washington, the Albany Institute of History & Art and the Metropolitan Museum of Art.

She died in Falls Village, Connecticut in 1986.
