= Jay W. Lathrop =

American engineer and inventor of photolithography (1927–2022)

- Lathrop in c.1970s
- Born: Jay Wallace Lathrop; September 6, 1927; Bangor, Maine, US
- Died: October 9, 2022 (aged 95); Asheville, North Carolina, US
- Education: University of Maine; Massachusetts Institute of Technology (BS, MS, PhD)
- Known for: invention of photolithography
- Scientific career
- Workplaces: Diamond Ordnance Fuze Laboratories, Texas Instruments, Clemson University
- Thesis: Characteristics of steady-state maintaining fields in microwave gas discharges (1952)
- Doctoral advisor: Sanborn C. Brown

Jay Wallace Lathrop (Bangor, Maine, 6 September 1927 - Asheville, North Carolina, 9 October 2022) was an American engineer and inventor of photolithography.

Born in 1927 in Bangor, Maine, Lathrop studied physics in the University of Maine, and Massachusetts Institute of Technology, where he get his BS, MS, and PhD. When he worked as an engineer for the US Army's Diamond Ordnance Fuze Laboratories in the 1950s, he needed to devise a "new proximity fuze to go inside a mortar shell only a couple of inches in diameter". The transistors that existed at that time were too large, and Lathrop tried to miniaturise them. Lathrop, together with Jim Nall, used photoresist from Eastman Kodak to create a mask on a germanium, thus inventing photolithography. They were awarded with $25,000 by the army for their invention in 1958; Lathrop bought "a new station wagon" with this money.

Lathrop worked for seven years at the Diamond Ordnance Fuze Lab; he then found a job at Texas Instruments in Dallas, where he spent ten years and became Director of Advanced Technology for the Semiconductor Division; he worked there with Jack Kilby. In 1968 he became a professor at Clemson University.

Lathrop died on October 9, 2022, at Asheville, North Carolina, and donated his body to the Medical University of South Carolina.
