= Military history of Afghanistan =

The Military history of Afghanistan (Pashto: د افغانستان مسلح ځواک) began before 1709 when the Hotaki dynasty was established in Kandahar followed by the Durrani Empire. The Afghan military was re-organized with assistance from the British in 1880, when the country was ruled by Amir Abdur Rahman Khan. It was modernized during King Amanullah Khan's rule in the early 20th century, and then during King Zahir Shah's forty-year rule; the Soviet Union supplied almost all weapons, training and military needs between the 1950s and 1970s. From 1978 to 1992, the Soviet-backed Afghan Armed Forces engaged in heavy fighting with the multi-national mujahideen groups who were then backed by the United States, Pakistan and others. After President Najibullah's resignation in 1992 and the end of Soviet support, the Afghan military dissolved into portions controlled by different factions. This era was followed by the Taliban regime, whose leaders were trained and influenced by the Pakistan Armed Forces.

After the removal of the Taliban regime in late 2001 and the formation of the Afghan Interim Administration, new military units were created. They were trained by NATO-member states, primarily by the United States. The Afghan Armed Forces operated independently but received some air support from the U.S. Air Force. As a major non-NATO ally, Afghanistan continued to receive billions of dollars in military assistance from the United States up until mid-2021.

With the Taliban takeover of Afghanistan in August 2021, the Islamic Republic Armed Forces were effectively dissolved, with the former insurgents becoming the country's new military. Remnants of the disbanded Afghan National Army regrouped to form the National Resistance Front of Afghanistan to wage guerrilla warfare against the Emirate.

== Origins ==
Afghans have served in the militaries of the Ghaznavids (963–1187), Ghurids (1148–1215), Delhi Sultanate (1206–1527), Mughals (1526–1858) and the Persian army. The current Afghan military traces its origin to the early 18th century when the Hotaki dynasty rose to power in Kandahar and defeated the Persian Safavid Empire at the Battle of Gulnabad in 1722.

"The sun had just appeared on the horizon when the armies began to observe each other with that curiosity so natural on these dreadful occasions. The Persian army just come out of the capital, being composed of whatever was most brilliant at court, seemed as if it had been formed rather to make a show than to fight. The riches and variety of their arms and vestments, the beauty of their horses, the gold and precious stones with which some of their harnesses were covered, and the richness of their tents contributed to render the Persian camp very pompous and magnificent.
On the other side there was a much smaller body of soldiers, disfigured with fatigue and the scorching heat of the sun. Their clothes were so ragged and torn in so long a march that they were scarce sufficient to cover them from the weather, and, their horses being adorned with only leather and brass, there was nothing glittering about them but their spears and sabres..."

— Jonas Hanway, 1712–1786

When Ahmad Shah Durrani formed the Durrani Empire in 1747, his Afghan army fought a number of wars in the Punjab region of Hindustan during the 18th to the 19th century. One of the famous battles was the 1761 Battle of Panipat in which the Afghans invaded and won a victory against the Maratha Empire. The Afghans then engaged multiple wars with the Sikh Empire. The Afghan–Sikh Wars saw major territorial losses for the Afghans. During the First Anglo-Afghan War, British India invaded Afghanistan in 1838 but withdrew in 1842. During these three years a number of battles took place in different parts of Afghanistan.

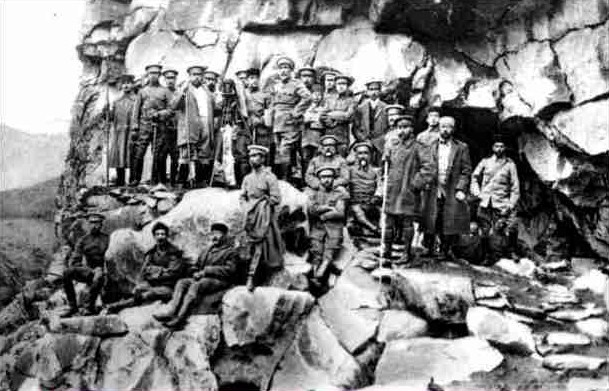
King Habibullah Khan with the military men of Afghanistan in the early 1900s.

Traditionally, Afghan governments relied on three military institutions: the regular army, tribal levies, and community militias. The regular army was sustained by the state and commanded by government leaders. The tribal or regional levies - irregular forces - consisted of part-time soldiers provided by tribal or regional chieftains. The chiefs received tax breaks, land ownership, cash payments, or other privileges in return. The community militia included all available able-bodied members of the community, mobilized to fight, probably only in exceptional circumstances, for common causes under community leaders. Combining these three institutions created a formidable force whose components supplemented each other's strengths and minimized their weaknesses.

At the outbreak of the Second Anglo-Afghan War (1878–80) the regular army was about 50,000 strong and consisted of 62 infantry and 16 cavalry regiments, with 324 guns mostly organized in horse and mountain artillery batteries. Jalali writes that '..although Amir Shir Ali Khan (1863–78) is widely credited for founding the modern Afghan Army, it was only under Abdur Rahman that it became a viable and effective institution.' The Library of Congress Country Study for Afghanistan states:

Abdur Rahman was the creator of the modern Afghan state. When he came to the throne [in 1880], the army was virtually nonexistent. With the assistance of a liberal financial loan from the British, plus their aid in the form of weapons, ammunition, and other military supplies, he began a 20-year task of creating a respectable regular force by instituting measures that formed the long-term basis of the military system. These included increasing the equalization of military obligation by setting up a system known as the hasht nafari (whereby one man in every eight between the ages of 20 and 40 took his turn at military service); constructing an arsenal in Kabul to reduce dependence on foreign sources for small arms and other ordnance; introducing supervised training courses; organizing troops into divisions, brigades, and regiments, including battalions of artillery; developing pay schedules; and introducing an elementary (and harsh) disciplinary system.

== 20th century ==
After the Third Anglo-Afghan War ended, the reforming Amanullah Khan did not see the need for a large army, instead deciding to rely on Afghanistan's historical martial qualities. This resulted in neglect, cutbacks, recruitment problems, and finally an army unable to quell the 1929 uprising that cost him his throne. However, under his reign, the Afghan Air Force was formed in 1924. The Afghan Armed Forces were expanded during King Zahir Shah's reign, reaching a strength of 70,000 in 1933. Adamec writes that the army was 60,000 strong in 1936, and included two corps in Kabul; three divisions in the Southern Province; one division Household troops (Guard Division); one artillery division; and two independent mixed divisions. Total divisions were 13 plus the artillery division. It is not clear how much the Army was involved in the Afghan tribal revolts of 1944–1947.

=== Soviet aid ===
Following the Second World War, Afghanistan briefly received continued military support from the British government under the Lancaster Plan from 1945 to 1947, until the partition of India transformed British priorities. Afghanistan declined to join the 1955 United States-sponsored Baghdad Pact; this rebuff did not stop the United States from continuing its low-level aid program, but it was reluctant to provide Afghanistan with military assistance, so Daoud turned to the Soviet Union and its allies, and in 1955 he received approximately US$25 million of military aid.

During the 1950s and 1960s, Afghanistan purchased moderate quantities of Soviet weapons. It was mainly Sukhoi Su-7, Mikoyan-Gurevich MiG-21 fighter jets, T-34 and Iosif Stalin tanks, SU-76 self-propelled guns, GAZ-69 4x4 light trucks of jeep class (in many versions), ZIL-157 military trucks, Katyusha multiple rocket launchers, and BTR-40 and BTR-152 armored personnel carriers. Also included were PPSh-41 and RPK machine guns.

In addition, the Soviet Union and its allies began construction of military airfields in Bagram, Mazar-e-Sharif, and Shindand. By the 1960s, Soviet assistance started to improve the structure, armament, training, and command and control arrangements for the military. The Afghan Armed Forces reached a strength of 98,000 (90,000 soldiers and 8,000 airmen) by this period.

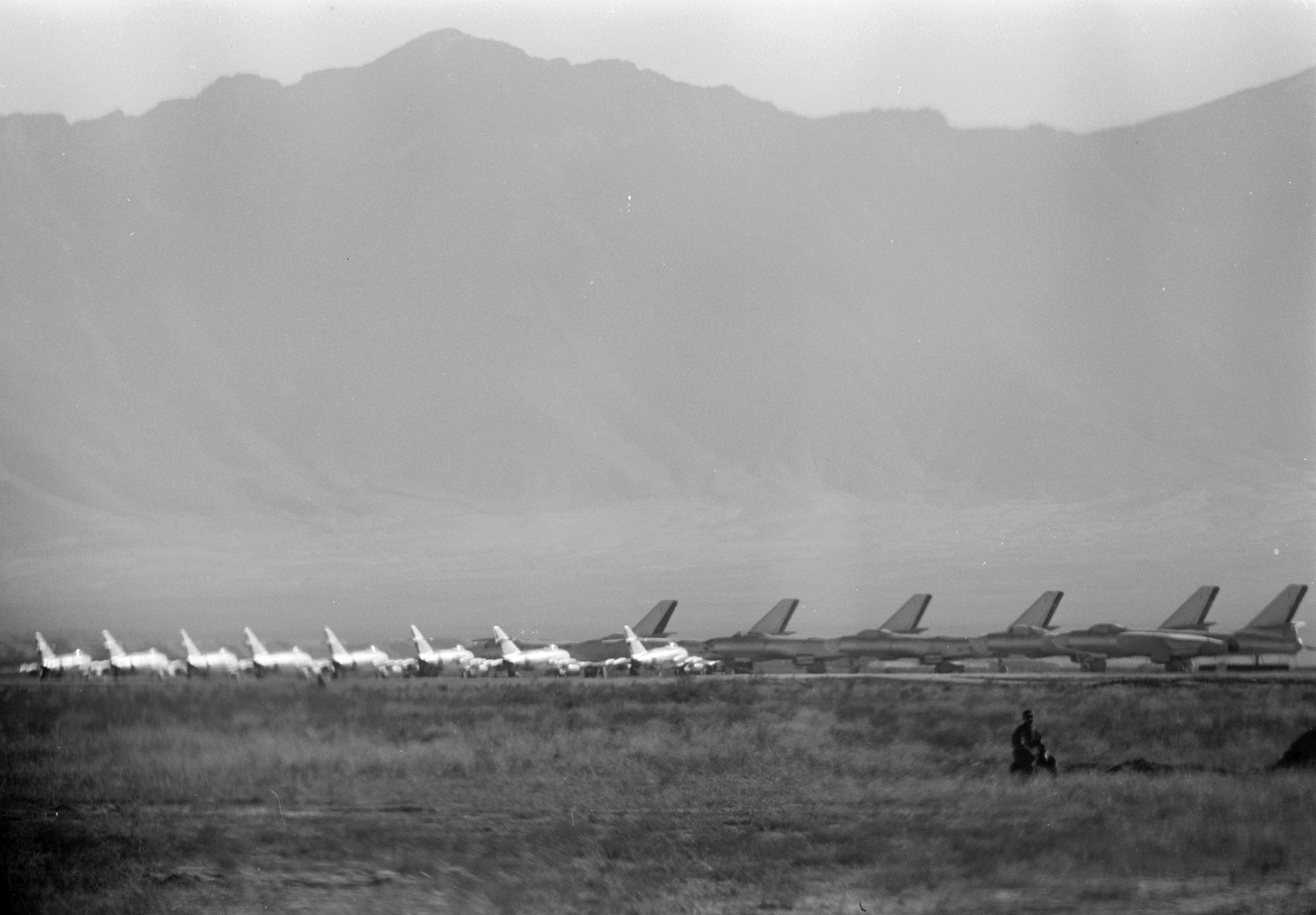
Mikoyan-Gurevich MiG-15 fighters and Ilyushin Il-28 bombers of the Royal Afghan Air Force in 1959.

During this time in September 1960, irregulars & regulars of the Royal Afghan Army invaded the Bajaur district of Pakistan which resulted in intense skirmishes with Pakistani forces & local Pakistani tribesmen. However, the Afghan forces faced a defeat after they were flushed out of the area.

After the exile of King Zahir Shah in 1973, President Daud Khan forged stronger ties with the Soviets by signing two highly controversial military aid packages for his nation in 1973 and 1975. Between 1973 and 1978, Afghanistan obtained more sophisticated Soviet weapons such as Mi-4 and Mi-8 helicopters, Sukhoi Su-22 and Il-28 jets. A great many T-55, T-62, and PT-76 tanks arrived and huge amounts of AKM assault rifles were ordered. Armored vehicles delivered in the 1970s also included ZIL-135s, BMP-1s, BRDM-1s, BTR-60s, UAZ-469, and GAZ-66 as well as large quantities of small arms and artillery. The Afghan Armed Forces and police continued to receive up-to-date Soviet weapons, as well as training by the KGB and Soviet Armed Forces, for another three years. Due to problems with local political parties in his country, President Daud Khan decided to distance himself from the Soviets in 1976. He made Afghanistan's ties closer to the Greater Middle East and the United States instead.

By the time Daoud visited the Soviet Union again in April 1977, the Soviets were aware of his purge of the left that began in 1975, his removal of Soviet advisers from some Afghan military units, and his diversification of Afghan military training (especially to nations like India and Egypt, where they could be trained with Soviet weapons but not by Soviets).

In April 1978 there was a coup, known as the Saur Revolution, orchestrated by members of the government loyal to the People's Democratic Party of Afghanistan (PDPA). This led to a full-scale Soviet invasion in December 1979, led by the 40th Army and the Airborne Forces. In 1981 the total strength of the Afghan Armed Forces was around 85,000 troops according to The New York Times. The Afghan Army had around 35–40,000 soldiers, mostly conscripts; the Air Force had around 7,000 personnel; and the total of all military personnel was around 87,000 in 1984. Throughout the 1980s, the Afghan Armed Forces was heavily involved in fighting against the multi-national mujahiddin rebel groups who were largely backed by the United States and trained by the Pakistan Armed Forces. The rebel groups were fighting to force the Soviet Union to withdraw from Afghanistan as well as to remove the Soviet-backed government of President Mohammad Najibullah. Due to large number of defectors, the Afghan Armed Forces in 1985 were reduced to no more than about 47,000, the actual figure probably being lower. The Air Force had over 150 combat aircraft with about 7,000 officers who were supported by up to 5,000 Cuban Revolutionary Air and Air Defense Force and Czechoslovak Air Force advisers.

Under the Democratic Republic of Afghanistan (1978–1992), weapon deliveries by the Soviets were increased and included Mi-24 helicopters, MiG-23 fighter aircraft, ZSU-23-4 "Shilka" and ZSU-57-2 anti-aircraft self-propelled mounts, MT-LB armored personnel carriers, BM-27 "Uragan" and BM-21 "Grad" multiple-launch rocket systems and FROG-7 and Scud launchers. Some of the weapons that were not damaged during the decades of wars are still being used today.

Weapons supplies were made available to the mujahideen rebel groups through numerous countries; the United States purchased all of Israel's captured Soviet weapons clandestinely, and then funnelled the weapons to the mujahideen rebels, while Egypt upgraded their own Army's weapons, and sent the older weapons to the mujahideen, Turkey sold its World War II stockpiles to the warlords, and the British and Swiss provided Blowpipe missiles and Oerlikon anti-aircraft guns respectively, after they were found to be poor models for their own forces. China provided the most relevant weapons, likely due to their own experience with guerrilla warfare, and kept meticulous record of all the shipments.

Following the Soviet withdrawal in 1989 the mujahiddin rebel attacks continued and grew in intensity. For several years the Afghan Armed Forces had actually increased their effectiveness past levels ever achieved during the Soviet military presence. The eleven-year Siege of Khost ended with the city's fall in March 1991. But the government was dealt a major blow when Abdul Rashid Dostum, a leading general, switched allegiances to the mujahideen forces in 1992 and together they captured the city of Kabul. By 1992 the Army fragmented into regional militias under local warlords because of the fall of the Soviet Union which stopped supplying the Afghan Armed Forces and later in 1992 when the Democratic Republic of Afghanistan government lost power.

"The fall of the Moscow-backed regime in 1992 disintegrated the state as well as the army. Bits and pieces of the fragmented military either disappeared or joined the warring factions that were locked in a drawn-out power struggle. The warring factions were composed of odd assortments of armed groups with varying levels of loyalties, political commitment, professional skills, and organizational integrity."

— Ahmed Ali Jalali, 2002

After the fall of Najibullah's regime in 1992, the various Afghan political parties began to assemble their own more formal armed forces. By February 1992 Massoud's Jamiat-i-Islami had a central force reported at six battalions strong, plus additional second tier units, "the bulk of the army, ..made up of regional battalions, subordinate to local commanders of the Supervisory Council." On 16 January 1993 Jane's Defence Weekly reported that "a special assembly of 1335 delegates elected from across Afghanistan" had both elected Professor Burhanuddin Rabbani as President of the Islamic State of Afghanistan for two years, and agreed to "establish a regular army with soldiers mostly drawn from Mojahedin groups." Pakistan had offered training assistance. However, a Civil War started between the various warlords, including Ahmad Shah Massoud, Gulbuddin Hekmatyar, Abdul Rashid Dostum, Abdul Ali Mazari, Jalaluddin Haqqani, Ismail Khan, Atta Muhammad Nur, Abdul Rasul Sayyaf, Mohammad Nabi Mohammadi, Mohammad Yunus Khalis, Gul Agha Sherzai and many others. They received logistics support from foreign powers including Russia, Pakistan, India, Iran, China, France and others.

== First Taliban Government period ==
When the Taliban took power in 1996, the local warlords and their followers fled Kabul to the north of the country. With the backing and support of Pakistan, the Taliban solidified their own state military forces.Al-Qaeda was also training its fighters in the Taliban controlled territory, including their high-quality 055 Brigade. The Taliban forces possessed over 400 T-54/55 and T-62 tanks and more than 200 Armoured personnel carriers. The Afghan Air Force under the Taliban maintained five supersonic MIG-21MFs and 10 Sukhoi-22 fighter-bombers. In 1995, during the 1995 Airstan incident, a Taliban fighter plane captured a Russian transport. They also held six Mil Mi-8 helicopters, five Mi-35s, five L-39Cs, six Antonov An-12, 25 An-26, a dozen An-24/32, an IL-18, and a Yakovlev.

== U.S. war in Afghanistan (2002–2021) ==
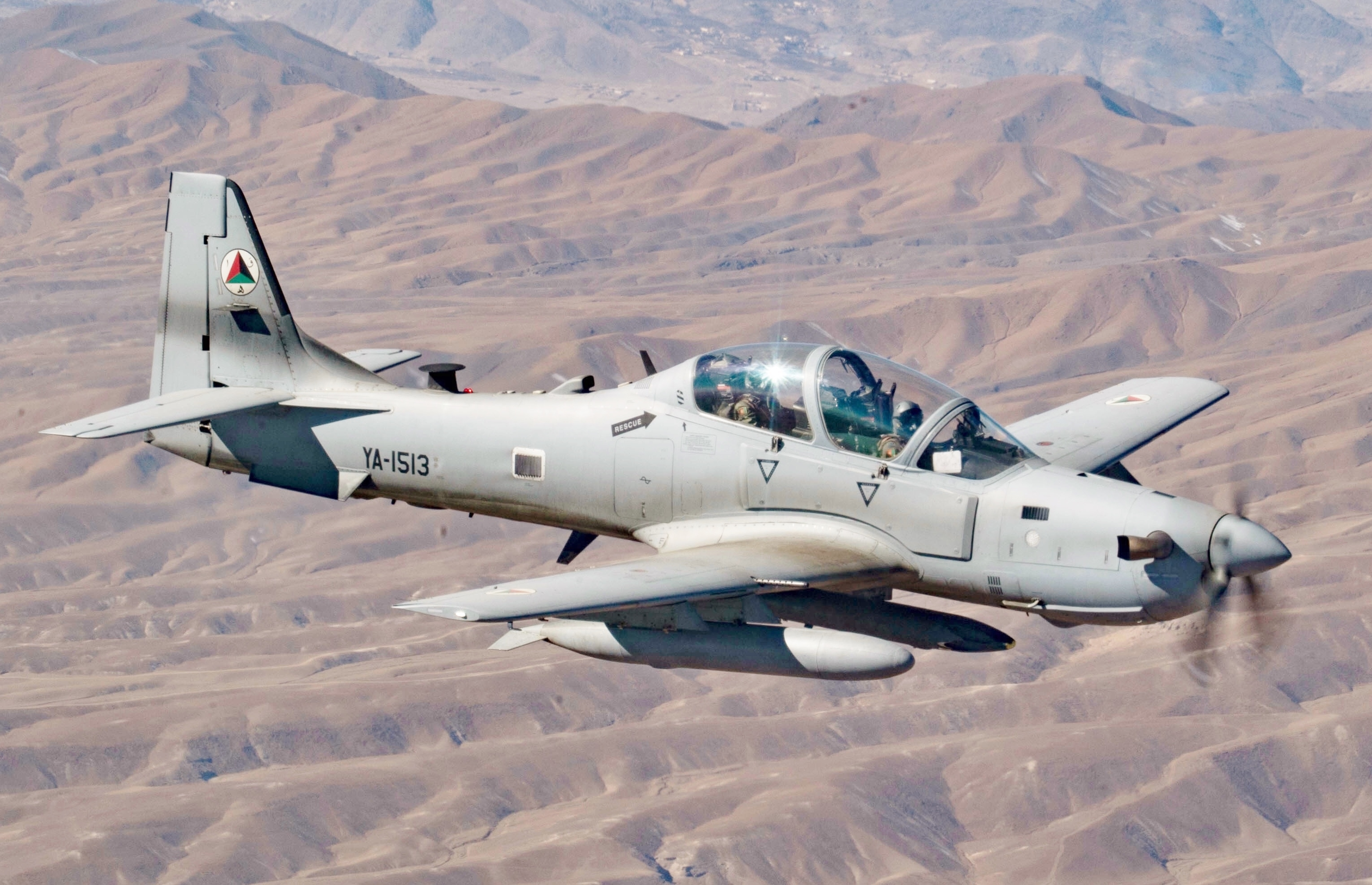
A-29 Super Tucano of the Afghan Air Force (AAF)

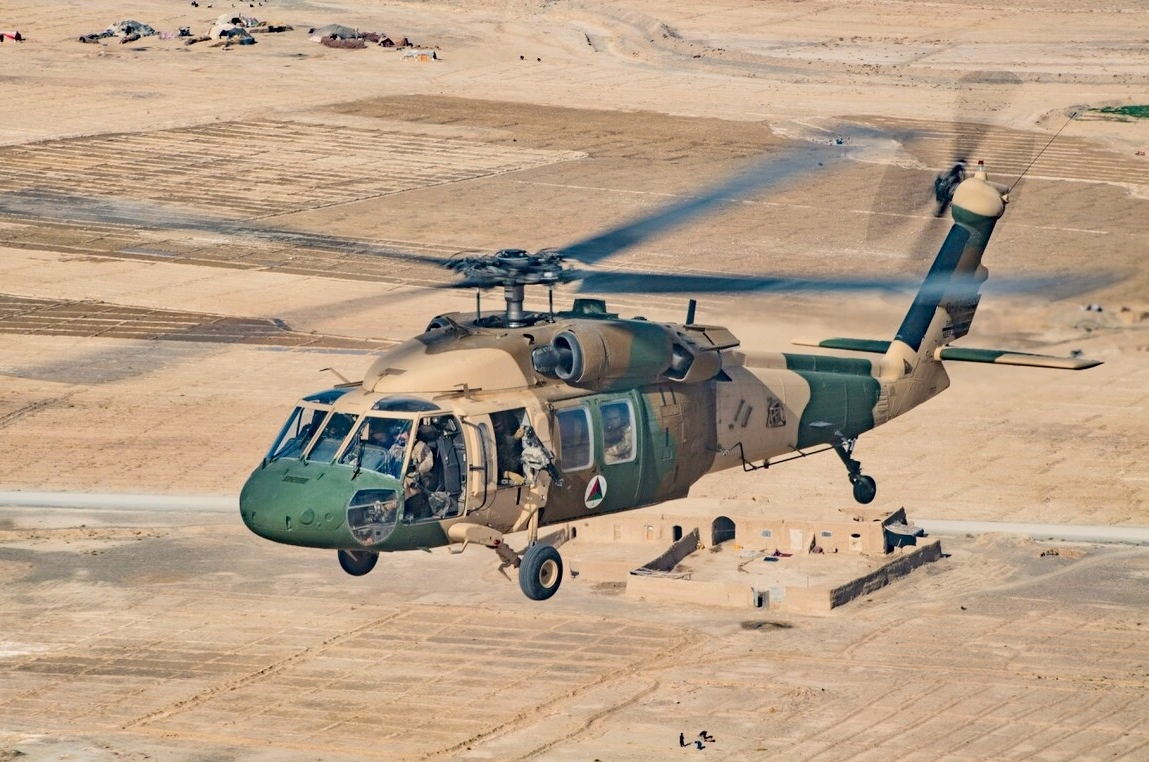
UH-60A Black Hawk

M1117 armored security vehicle (ASV)

After the formation of the Karzai administration in late 2001, the Afghan armed forces was gradually reestablished by the United States and its allies. Over two decades, 2001–2021, the United States spent an estimated $83 billion on the Afghan military through the Afghanistan Security Forces Fund and an additional $36 billion to support the Afghan government.

Initially, a new land force, the Afghan National Army (ANA), was created, along with an air arm, the Afghan National Army Air Corps, as part of the army. The army later included Commandos and Special Forces. The ANA Air Corps later split off to become an independent branch, the Afghan Air Force. Training was managed initially by the U.S. Office of Military Cooperation, followed by other U.S. organizations and then Combined Security Transition Command-Afghanistan, and was finally run by the Resolute Support Mission.

The President of the Islamic Republic of Afghanistan was the Commander-in-Chief of the Afghan Armed Forces, who were administratively controlled through the Ministry of Defence. Before the Fall of Kabul, they had major bases and small outposts all across Afghanistan, including in the provinces of Badakhshan, Balkh, Helmand, Herat, Kabul, Kandahar, Nangarhar and Parwan, as well as in the cities of Kunduz, Ghazni, Gardez, Khost, Fayzabad, Farah and Zaranj.

The Afghan Air Force was relatively capable before and during the 1980s but by late 2001, the number of operational aircraft available was minimal. The United States and its allies quickly eliminated the remaining strength and ability of the Taliban to operate aircraft in the opening stages of their intervention. With the occupation of airbases by American forces it became clear how destitute the Air Force had become since the withdrawal of the Soviet Union. Most aircraft were only remnants rusting away for a decade or more. Many others were relocated to neighboring countries for storage purposes or sold cheaply. The AAF was reduced to a very small force while the country was torn by civil war. It was gradually strengthened by CSTC-A's NATO-led multinational Combined Air Power Transition Force.

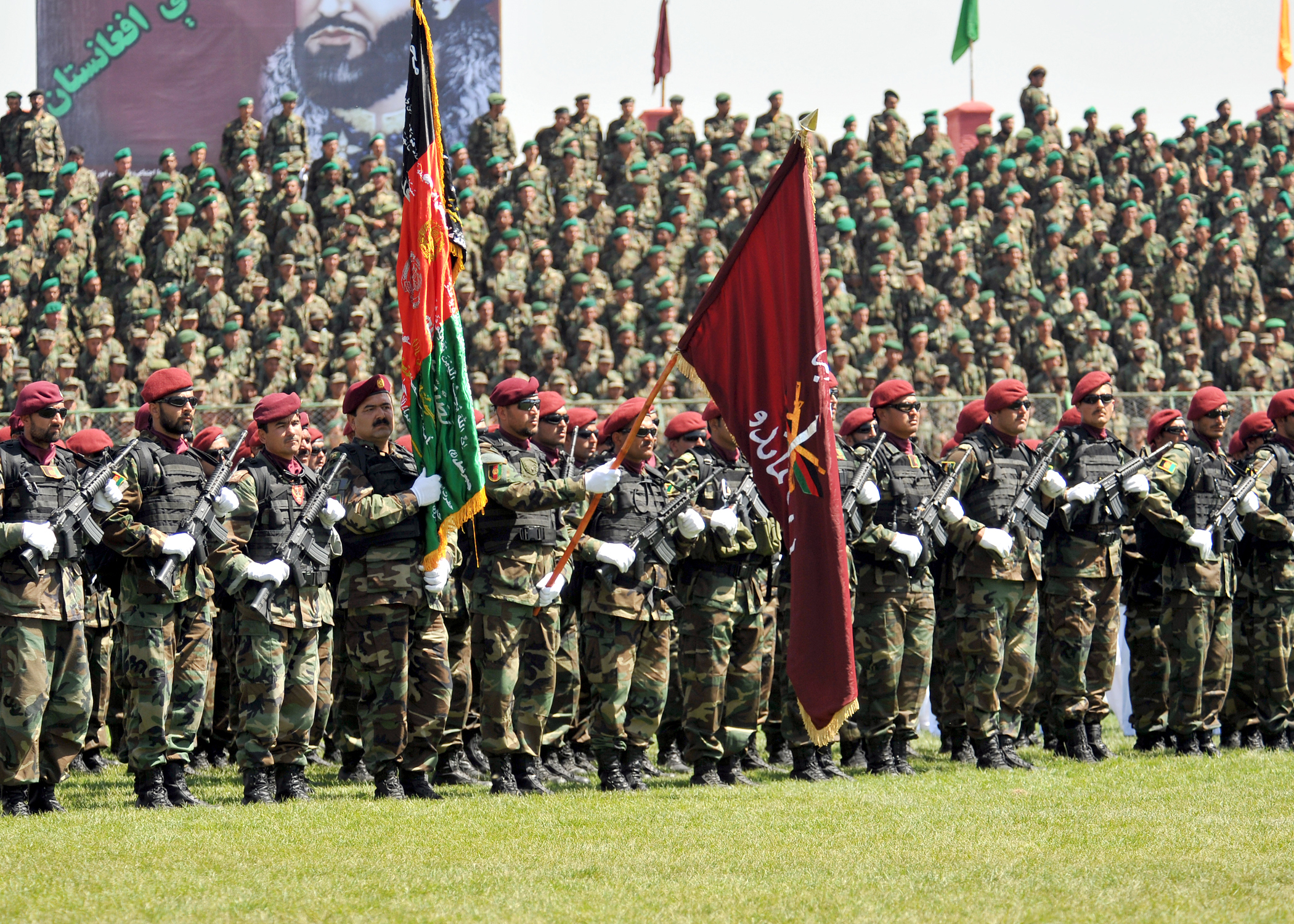
Soldiers of the Afghan National Army, including members of its Commando Corps standing in the front.

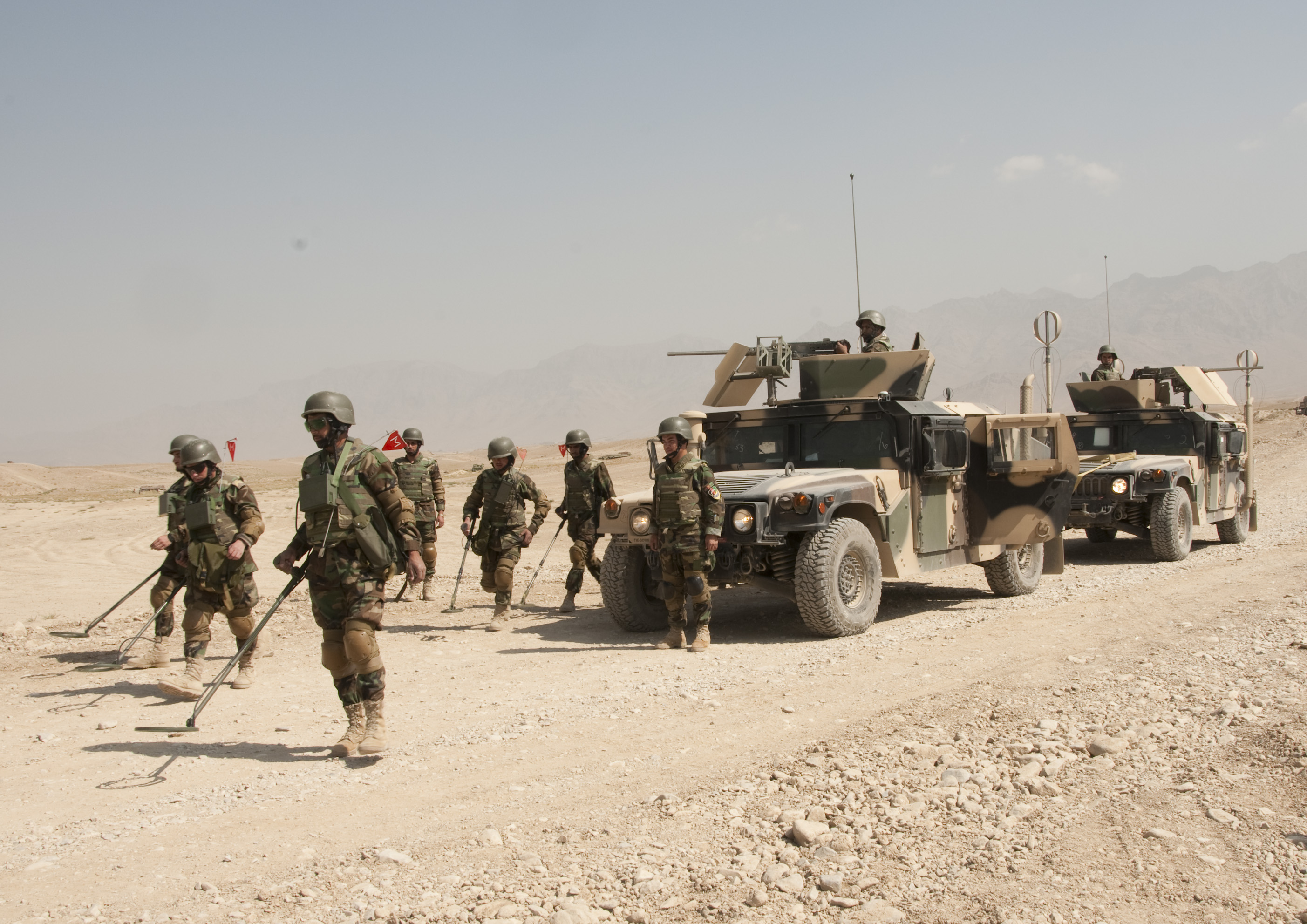
Soldiers training on how to clear improvised explosive devices (IEDs) on roads

By 2006, more than 60,000 former militiamen from around the country were disarmed. In 2007, it was reported that the DDR programmes had dismantled 274 paramilitary organizations, reintegrated over 62,000 militia members into civilian life, and recovered more than 84,000 weapons, including heavy weapons. But The New York Times also reported a rise in hoarded weapons and a growing Taliban threat, even in the north of the country.

Commandos were established in 2007, later growing from a battalion to a brigade. The aim of Disbandment of Illegal Armed Groups programme was to ban all illegal armed groups in all provinces of the country. Approximately 2,000 such groups have been identified; most of them surrendered to the Afghan government or joined the new armed forces.

The NATO-trained Afghan National Army grew to a size of 31 Kandaks, or Battalions, at one point 28 of which were announced as combat ready. Seven regional corps headquarters were created. The National Military Academy of Afghanistan was built to provide future officers, modeled after the United States Military Academy. The Marshal Fahim National Defense University is located in Kabul province and consists of a headquarters building, classrooms, dining facility, library, and medical clinic. In addition to this, an $80 million central command center was built next to the Hamid Karzai International Airport. In 2012, Afghanistan became a major non-NATO ally of the United States.

Sizable numbers of Afghan officers are sent to be trained in India either at the Indian Military Academy in Dehradun, the National Defence Academy near Pune or the Officers Training Academy in Chennai. The Indian Military Academy which has been in existence since 1932, provides a 4-year degree to army officers, while the National Defence Academy is a tri-service college provides a 3-year degree after which officers undergo a 1-year specialization in their respective service colleges. The Officers Training Academy on the other hand provides a 49-week course to Graduate officer candidates. In 2014 the number of Afghan officers in training in India was nearly 1,100. A total of 1200 Afghan officers were trained up to 2013.

The total manpower of the Afghan Armed Forces was approximately 186,000 as of 2021. It was around 164,000 in May 2011.

The United States was also largely responsible for the growth of the Afghan Air Force, as part of the Combined Air Power Transition Force, from four aircraft at the end of 2001 to about 100 as of 2011. Types include Lockheed C-130 Hercules and Pilatus PC-12 transport aircraft, as well as Mi-17 troop-carrying helicopters and Mil Mi-35 attack helicopters. The aircrew are being trained by an American team. Eventually the air force had over 200 refurbished aircraft, which includes A-29 Super Tucano attack aircraft, Lockheed C-130 Hercules and Pilatus PC-12s military transport aircraft, as well as UH-60A Black Hawk, Mil Mi-17, and other types of helicopters. It also included trainers such as Aero L-39 Albatros and Cessna 182s. The manpower of the Afghan Air Force was around 7,000, which includes over 450 pilots. It also had a small number of female pilots.

== Taliban government since mid-2021 ==
As of 15 August 2021, what remained of the Ghani government's armed forces were left leaderless and dispersed due to the 2021 Taliban offensive and the Fall of Kabul to the Taliban. Some have since partly regrouped as the National Resistance Front of Afghanistan.

As Afghan forces accepted the circumstances of the Doha Agreement and the withdrawal of United States troops from Afghanistan, they understood that American close air support and other strategic assets would no longer be available to support them in combat situations against the Taliban, and they became more willing to surrender to the attacking Taliban forces.

Other Afghans allied with the Afghan government looked for ways to maneuver themselves into better positions, having accepted the impending collapse of the government. The Taliban extended their control over the provinces through a series of negotiated surrenders. After Kunduz province was captured, a days long negotiation between the tribes and the Taliban resulted in a surrender of the government-controlled base to the Taliban. Similar negotiations in Herat saw a wave of resignations in the provincial government, and then the same in Helmand and Ghazni. Outgunned, Afghan special forces based in Kandahar fled. Police officers in Kandahar complained that they had not been paid for six months.

In early September 2021 the Taliban announced a new interim government. Among the appointees was Molvi Mullah Yaqoob, Defence Minister, son of ex-Taliban leader Mullah Omar; Mullah Mohammed Fazil Mazloom Akhund, deputy to the Defence Minister; and Qari Farseehuddin, a Tajik, listed as Army Chief.

As of October 2021 the Islamic Emirate Army is subdivided into eight corps, mostly superseding the previous corps of the Afghan National Army. They are listed below. In November 2021 Mullah Yaqoob, Acting Minister of Defense, announced the new names and of the corps.

Army Corps
Corps	Headquarters	Superseded Corps	Commander(s)	Ref(s)
313 Central Corps	Kabul		Maulvi Naqibullah "Sahib" (Chief of Staff); Maulvi Nasrullah "Mati" (Commander); Maulvi Nusrat (Deputy Commander)	
201 Khalid Ibn Walid Corps	Laghman	201st Corps	Abdul Rahman Mansoori (Chief of Staff); Abu Dujana (Commander); Ibrahim (Deputy Commander)	
203 Mansoori Corps	Gardez	203rd Corps	Ahmadullah Mubarak (Chief of Staff); Mohammad Ayub (Commander); Rohul Amin (Deputy Commander)	
205 Al-Badr Corps	Kandahar	205th Corps	Hizbullah Afghan (Chief of Staff); Mehrullah Hamad (Commander); Wali Jan Hamza (Deputy Commander)	
207 Al-Farooq Corps	Herat	207th Corps	Abdul Rahman Haqqani (Chief of Staff); Mohammad Zarif Muzaffar (Commander); Abdul Shakur Baryalai (Deputy Commander)	
209 Al-Fatah Corps	Mazar-i-Sharif	209th Corps	Abdul Razzaq Faizullah (Chief of Staff); Attaullah Omari (Commander); Maulvi Amanuddin (Deputy Commander)	
215 Azam Corps	Helmand	215th Corps	Maulvi Abdul Aziz "Ansari" (Chief of Staff); Sharafuddin Taqi (Commander); Mohibullah Nusrat (Deputy Commander)	
217 Omari Corps	Kunduz	217th Corps	Mohammad Shafiq (Chief of Staff); Rahmatullah Mohammad (Commander); Mohammad Ismail Turkman (Deputy Commander)	

Badri 313 Battalion, reported as operating in Kabul, is the only unit of the Taliban's armed forces that had the numerical designation 313.
