= Afghan Armed Forces =

Combined military forces of Afghanistan

- د افغانستان اسلامي امارت وسله وال ځواکونه (Pashto); قوای مسلح امارت اسلامی افغانستان (Dari)
- The emblem of the Islamic Emirate of Afghanistan serves as the badge for all branches of the armed forces
- Motto: Arabic: الارض لله والحكم لله ("The land of God and the rule of God"); Arabic: وطن، شرف، إخلاص ("Homeland, Honor, Sincerity"); Pashto: سر ورکوو٬ سنګر نه ورکوو "Sacrifice our Heads, but not our Trenches" (pre-1992); Dari: وطن یا کفن "Homeland or the Shroud" (pre-1992)
- Founded: 1919; 107 years ago
- Current form: 8 November 2021; 5 years ago
- Service branches: Afghan Army; Afghan Air Force: Security Forces; Border Troops; Internal Troops; General Directorate of Intelligence
- Headquarters: Ministry of Defense, Kabul, Afghanistan
- Website: www.mod.gov.af/en

Leadership
- Supreme Commander: Hibatullah Akhundzada
- Minister of Defense: General Mullah Yaqoob
- Chief of Staff: General Fasihuddin Fitrat
- Commander-in-Chief of the Air Force: Abdul Ghaffar Mohammadi Noorzai

Personnel
- Active personnel: 150,000 (2025 est).

Industry
- Foreign suppliers: Russia; Belarus; India; Former suppliers: Soviet Union; German Democratic Republic; Czechoslovak Socialist Republic; United States (2001–2021)

Related articles
- History: Military history of Afghanistan: Afghan Civil War (1928–1929); Soviet–Afghan War; Afghan Civil War (1989–1992); Afghan Civil War (1992–1996); Afghan Civil War (1996–2001); War in Afghanistan (2001–2021); Republican insurgency in Afghanistan; Islamic State–Taliban conflict; Afghanistan–Pakistan clashes (2024–present); 2026 Afghanistan–Pakistan war
- Ranks: Military ranks of Afghanistan

The Afghan Armed Forces, officially the Armed Forces of the Islamic Emirate of Afghanistan (Pashto: د افغانستان اسلامي امارت وسله وال ځواکونه, Dari: قوای مسلح امارت اسلامی افغانستان) and also referred to as the Islamic Emirate Armed Forces, is the military of Afghanistan, commanded by the Taliban government from 1997 to 2001 and again since 15 August 2021.

The Taliban created the first iteration of the Emirate's armed forces in 1997 after taking over Afghanistan following the end of the Afghan Civil War which raged between 1992 and 1996. However, the first iteration of the armed forces was dissolved in 2001 after the downfall of the first Taliban government following the United States invasion of Afghanistan. It was officially reestablished on 8 November 2021 after the Taliban's victory in the War in Afghanistan on 15 August 2021 following the recapture of Kabul and the collapse of the U.S.-backed Islamic Republic of Afghanistan and its Afghan National Army as a whole, with the re-establishment of the Islamic Emirate of Afghanistan after being out of power for 20 years.

Reporting from 2022–23 placed armed forces and associated groups' personnel totals at 165,000–170,000. Calculations in 2025-26, published in the IISS Military Balance 2026 (published February 2026) reassessed that figure as 150,000. Peer-reviewed publications have emphasized how Taliban forces have historically been loose and patrimonial, rather than organised and bureaucratic.

== History of the Armed Forces ==
During this time in September 1960, irregulars & regulars of the Royal Afghan Army invaded the Bajaur district of Pakistan which resulted in intense skirmishes with Pakistani forces & local Pakistani tribesmen. However, the Afghan forces faced a defeat after they were flushed out of the area. After the exile of King Zahir Shah in 1973, President Daud Khan forged stronger ties with the Soviets by signing two highly controversial military aid packages for his nation in 1973 and 1975. Between 1973 and 1978, Afghanistan obtained more sophisticated Soviet weapons such as Mi-4 and Mi-8 helicopters, Sukhoi Su-22 and Il-28 jets. A great many T-55, T-62, and PT-76 tanks arrived and huge amounts of AKM assault rifles were ordered. Armored vehicles delivered in the 1970s also included ZIL-135s, BMP-1s, BRDM-1s, BTR-60s, UAZ-469, and GAZ-66 as well as large quantities of small arms and artillery. The Afghan Armed Forces and police continued to receive up-to-date Soviet weapons, as well as training by the KGB and Soviet Armed Forces, for another three years. Due to problems with local political parties in his country, President Daud Khan decided to distance himself from the Soviets in 1976. He made Afghanistan's ties closer to the Greater Middle East and the United States instead.

By the time Daoud visited the Soviet Union again in April 1977, the Soviets were aware of his purge of the left that began in 1975, his removal of Soviet advisers from some Afghan military units, and his diversification of Afghan military training (especially to nations like India and Egypt, where they could be trained with Soviet weapons but not by Soviets).

In April 1978, there was a coup, known as the Saur Revolution, orchestrated by members of the government loyal to the People's Democratic Party of Afghanistan (PDPA). This led to a full-scale Soviet invasion in December 1979 by the 40th Army, plus the 103rd Guards Airborne Division. In 1981, the total strength of the Afghan Armed Forces was around 85,000 troops, according to The New York Times. The Afghan Army had around 35,000–40,000 soldiers, mostly conscripts; the Afghan Air Force had around 7,000 personnel; and the total of all military personnel was around 87,000 in 1984. Throughout the 1980s, the Afghan Armed Forces was heavily involved in fighting against the mujahideen rebel groups who were largely backed by the United States and trained by the Pakistan Armed Forces. The rebel groups were fighting to force the Soviet Union to withdraw from Afghanistan as well as to remove the Soviet-backed government of President Mohammad Najibullah. Due to large number of defectors, the Afghan Armed Forces in 1985 were reduced to no more than about 47,000, the actual figure probably being lower. The Air Force had over 150 combat aircraft with about 7,000 officers who were supported by up to 5,000 Cuban Revolutionary Air and Air Defense Force and Czechoslovak Air Force advisers.

Under the Democratic Republic of Afghanistan (1978–1992), weapon deliveries by the Soviets were increased and included Mi-24 helicopters, MiG-23 fighter aircraft, ZSU-23-4 Shilka and ZSU-57-2 anti-aircraft self-propelled mounts, MT-LB armored personnel carriers, BM-27 Uragan and BM-21 Grad multiple-launch rocket systems and 9K52 Luna-M and Scud missile launchers. Some of the weapons that were not damaged during the decades of wars are still being used today.

Weapons supplies were made available to the mujahideen rebel groups through numerous countries; the United States purchased all of Israel's captured Soviet weapons clandestinely, and then funnelled the weapons to the mujahideen rebels, while Egypt upgraded their own Army's weapons and sent the older weapons to the mujahideen, Turkey sold its World War II stockpiles, and the British and Swiss provided Blowpipe missiles and Oerlikon anti-aircraft guns respectively, after they were found to be poor models for their own forces. China provided the most relevant weapons, likely due to their own experience with guerrilla warfare, and kept meticulous record of all the shipments.

Following the Soviet withdrawal in 1989, the mujahideen rebel attacks continued and grew in intensity. For several years the Afghan Armed Forces had actually increased their effectiveness past levels ever achieved during the Soviet military presence. The eleven-year Siege of Khost ended with the city's fall in March 1991. But the government was dealt a major blow when Abdul Rashid Dostum, a leading general, switched allegiances to the mujahideen forces in 1992 and together they captured the city of Kabul.

By 1992 the Afghan Army fragmented into regional militias under local warlords because of the fall of the Soviet Union which stopped supplying the Democratic Republic of Afghanistan's Armed Forces and later in 1992 when the Democratic Republic of Afghanistan government lost power.

The fall of the Moscow-backed regime in 1992 disintegrated the state as well as the army. Bits and pieces of the fragmented military either disappeared or joined the warring factions that were locked in a drawn-out power struggle. The warring factions were composed of odd assortments of armed groups with varying levels of loyalties, political commitment, professional skills, and organizational integrity.

— Ahmed Ali Jalali, 2002

After the fall of Mohammad Najibullah's regime in 1992, the various Afghan political parties began to assemble their own more formal armed forces. By February 1992, Massoud's Jamiat-i-Islami had a central force reported at six battalions strong, plus additional second tier units, "the bulk of the army, ..made up of regional battalions, subordinate to local commanders of the Supervisory Council." On 16 January 1993, Jane's Defence Weekly reported that "a special assembly of 1335 delegates elected from across Afghanistan" had both elected Professor Burhanuddin Rabbani as President of the Islamic State of Afghanistan for two years, and agreed to "establish a regular army with soldiers mostly drawn from Mojahedin groups." Pakistan had offered training assistance. However, a Civil War started between the various warlords, including Ahmad Shah Massoud, Gulbuddin Hekmatyar, Abdul Rashid Dostum, Abdul Ali Mazari, Jalaluddin Haqqani, Ismail Khan, Atta Muhammad Nur, Abdul Rasul Sayyaf, Mohammad Nabi Mohammadi, Mohammad Yunus Khalis, Gul Agha Sherzai and many others.

The Taliban movement arose around Kandahar in southern Afghanistan and defeated the various armed movements there that had squabbled since the dissolution of the previous Afghan Army and Afghan Air Force. They moved to confront Ahmed Shah Massoud's forces by marching to the gates of Kabul in March 1995.

During the 1990s the Taliban maintained 400 T-54/55 and T-62 tanks and more than 200 armoured personnel carriers. The Taliban also began training its own army and commanders. After the removal of the Taliban government in late 2001, private armies loyal to warlords gained more and more influence. In mid-2001, Ali Jalali wrote:

The army (as a state institution, organized, armed, and commanded by the state) does not exist in Afghanistan today. Neither the Taliban-led "Islamic Emirate of Afghanistan" nor the "Islamic State of Afghanistan" headed by the ousted President Rabbani has the political legitimacy or administrative efficiency of a state. The militia formations they command are composed of odd assortments of armed groups with varying level of loyalties, political commitment, professional skills, and organizational integrity. Many of them feel free to switch sides, shift loyalties, and join or leave the group spontaneously. The country suffers from the absence of a top political layer capable of controlling individual and group violence. ... Although both sides identify their units with military formations of the old regime, there is hardly any organizational or professional continuity from the past. But these units really exist in name only ... in fact only their military bases still exist, accommodating and supporting an assortment of militia groups.

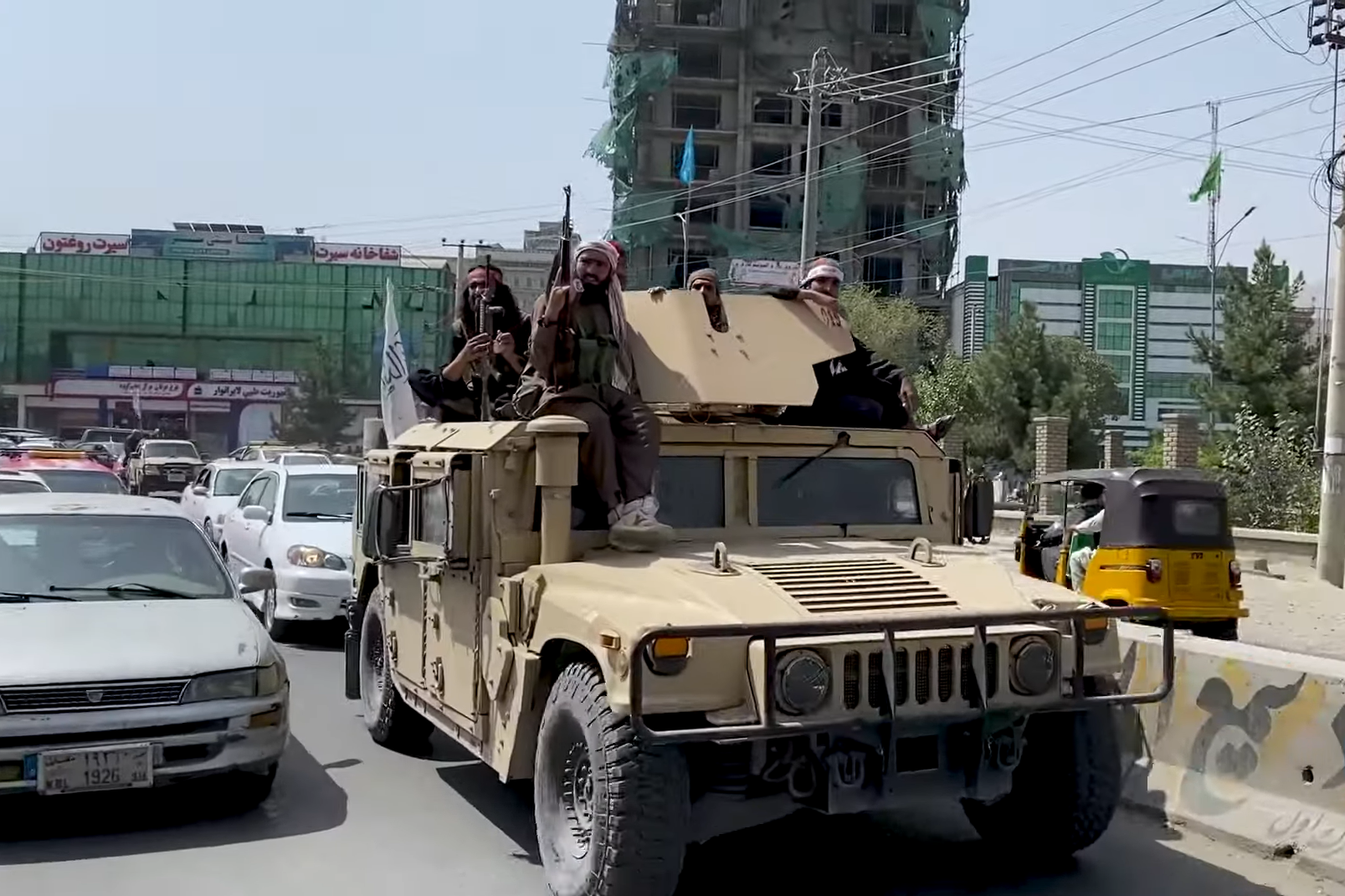
Taliban Humvee in the streets of Kabul following its fall, 2021

During the 1990s the Taliban's air force had five supersonic MiG-21MFs and 10 Sukhoi-22 fighter-bombers. They also had six Mil Mi-8 helicopters, five Mi-35s, five L-39Cs, six An-12s, 25 An-26s, a dozen An-24 and An-32s, an IL-18, and a Yakovlev. Their civil air service contained two Boeing 727A/Bs, a Tu-154, five An-24s, and a DHC-6.

On 3 August 1995, Taliban Mikoyan-Gurevich MiG-21 fighters forced a Russian Ilyushin-76 cargo plane carrying arms from Albania to Afghanistan to land at Kandahar. Negotiations between the Russian government and the Taliban to free the men stalled for over a year and efforts by American senator Hank Brown to mediate between the two parties broke down over a prisoner exchange. Brown was able to get the Taliban to agree that the Russian crew should be allowed to maintain their aircraft. This request paved the way for their escape.

=== U.S. assistance period (2001–2021) ===
After the formation of the Karzai administration in late 2001, the Afghan armed forces were gradually reestablished as part of the Afghan National Security Forces by the United States and its allies. Over two decades, 2001–2021, the United States spent an estimated $83 billion on the Afghan military through the Afghanistan Security Forces Fund and an additional $36 billion to support the Afghan government.

Initially, a new land force, the Afghan National Army (ANA), was created in 2002, along with an air arm in 2006, the Afghan National Army Air Corps. The army later also included Commandos and Special Forces. The ANA Air Corps later was renamed as the Afghan Air Force while remaining part of the army. Training was managed initially by the U.S. Office of Military Cooperation, followed by other U.S. organizations and then Combined Security Transition Command-Afghanistan, and was finally run by the Resolute Support Mission.

== Branches ==
=== Army ===
The army under the Taliban Islamic Movement was inaugurated on 8 November 2021 as the Army of the Islamic Emirate of Afghanistan, which is also referred to as the Islamic National Army, the Islamic Emirate Army and the Afghan Army. The army itself relies heavily on captured hardware from the defeated Afghan National Army. Approximately 2,000 vehicles fell into Taliban hands after the Fall of Kabul, including the Humvee, M1117 Guardian, MaxxPro MRAP and Oshkosh ATV. In terms of infantry equipment, captured items include the M4 carbine, M16 rifle, night-vision goggles, body armor suits, communication equipment and shoulder-mounted grenade launchers. These U.S. made firearms are reportedly replacing Russian made AK-47s and AK-74s carried by most Taliban fighters.

From 1 September 2021 to 10 January 2022, 15,102 newly trained fighters were inducted into the Islamic Emirate Army as calculated on the official site, the average number of new soldiers inducted is 120 soldiers per week not counting paramilitaries.

==== Corps reported in 2021 ====
The conventional land forces of the Islamic Emirate Army were subdivided into eight corps in 2021, mostly superseding the previous corps of the former Afghan National Army. The conventional land warfare corps of the Islamic Emirate Army were renamed in November 2021 by Mullah Yaqoob, Acting Minister of Defence. They are listed below.

Corps
Symbol	Corps	Headquarters	Former Designation	Commander(s)	Ref(s)
	313 Central Corps	Kabul	N/A	Maulvi Naqibullah "Sahib" (Chief of Staff); Maulvi Nasrullah "Mati" (Commander); Maulvi Nusrat (Deputy Commander)	
	201 Khalid Ibn Walid Corps	Laghman	201st Corps	Abdul Rahman Mansoori (Chief of Staff); Abu Dujana (Commander); Ibrahim (Deputy Commander)	
	203 Mansoori Corps	Gardez	203rd Corps	Ahmadullah Mubarak (Chief of Staff); Mohammad Ayub (Commander); Rohul Amin (Deputy Commander)	
	205 Al-Badr Corps	Kandahar	205th Corps	Hizbullah Afghan (Chief of Staff); Mehrullah Hamad (Commander); Wali Jan Hamza (Deputy Commander)	
	207 Al-Farooq Corps	Herat	207th Corps	Abdul Rahman Haqqani (Chief of Staff); Mohammad Zarif Muzaffar (Commander); Abdul Shakur Baryalai (Deputy Commander)	
	209 Al-Fatah Corps	Mazar-i-Sharif	209th Corps	Abdul Razzaq Faizullah (Chief of Staff); Amir Khan Haqqani (Commander); Maulvi Amanuddin (Deputy Commander)	
	215 Azam Corps	Helmand	215th Corps	Maulvi Abdul Aziz "Ansari" (Chief of Staff); Sharafuddin Taqi (Commander); Mohibullah Nusrat (Deputy Commander)	
	217 Omari Corps	Kunduz	217th Corps	Mohammad Shafiq (Chief of Staff); Rahmatullah Mohammad (Commander); Mohammad Ismail Turkman (Deputy Commander)	

All the corps beyond Kabul can be definitively tied to previous Afghan National Army (ANA) formations. However the number '313' was not utilized by the ANA, in Kabul or beyond, and the only former Taliban unit with that number was the Badri 313 Battalion. Other reported units include the Victorious Force Unit and the Panipat unit.

The Badri 313 Battalion, the Red Unit, and the "Yarmouk 60 Special Forces Battalion" may have some special forces capabilities. These are not to be confused with the Afghanistan GCPSU, which function under the Islamic Republic up until 2021 as a police tactical unit.

=== Air Force ===
The Taliban created and ran a small air force in from 1996 to 2001. In late 2001 Operation Crescent Wind was the initial series of U.S. air strikes on Afghanistan. Initial U.S. targets included command and control nodes, air defenses, as well as the modest Air Force, with the airports of Kabul, Herat, Kandahar, Zaranj and Mazar-i-Sharif being targeted. The Taliban were believed to have had 40 pilots capable of getting some 50 Mikoyan-Gurevich MiG-21 (ASCC "Fishbed") and Sukhoi Su-22s (ASCC "Fitter") airborne, though there was less concern about these as traditional interceptors as there was about them eventually being loaded with explosives and used to suicide bomb American encampments.

After the re-establishment of the Islamic Emirate of Afghanistan and the fall of Kabul during the 2021 Taliban offensive, the Taliban established the Air Force of the Islamic Emirate of Afghanistan. This was also referred to as the Islamic Emirate Air Force and the Afghan Air Force. The air force acquired UH-60 Black Hawks, Mil Mi-24s (most of them without engines), Mil Mi-8s/Mil Mi-17s, A-29 Super Tucanos, Cessna 208s, and C-130 Hercules.

On 11 January 2022, the air force successfully demonstrated formerly unserviceable aircraft which were abandoned by the US Army and the former Afghan National Army after Kabul fell to the Taliban. They had been repaired, and were flown in front of outside observers. A new Taliban commander of the Afghan Air Force spoke as part of the announcement.

Personnel totals after the Taliban's return to power were vague. In 2022 the International Institute for Strategic Studies estimated on the basis of data made available to it that there were 75,000 full time personnel and 90,000 local militias (totaling 165,000). Official figures in 2023 were 170,000.

== Conscription ==
According to the testimony of Guantanamo detainees before their Combatant Status Review Tribunals, the Taliban, in addition to conscripting men to serve as soldiers, also conscripted men to staff its civil service.

According to a report from the University of Oxford, the Taliban made widespread use of the conscription of children in 1997, 1998 and 1999. During the civil war that preceded the Taliban regime, thousands of orphaned boys joined various militia for "employment, food, shelter, protection and economic opportunity." The report said that during its initial period the Taliban "long depended upon cohorts of youth". Witnesses stated that each land-owning family had to provide one young man and $500 in expenses. In August of 1999, approximately 5000 students aged between 15 and 35 left madrassas in Pakistan to join the Taliban.

== Equipment ==
After 1945, equipment suppliers included the People's Republic of China, Iran, the Democratic People's Republic of Korea, the Soviet Union, and the Russian Federation.
