= List of Afghan Armed Forces installations =

This is a list of Afghan Armed Forces bases and installations used by the Afghan Air Force (AAF) and the Afghan National Army (ANA).

== Air bases ==
Base	Location	Description
Ahmad Shah Baba International Airport	Kandahar, Kandahar Province	Locaked in Built by engineers from the United States around 1960 and recently expanded, it is also a dual-use airport serving civilian traffic to Kandahar and military support for the southern and central portions of the country. It is the home of AAF 2nd Wing. Kandahar has been a major center for American and Canadian forces and in mid-2009 underwent a major build-up of US/Coalition forces.
Bagram Air Base	Charikar, Parwan Province	Established in the 1950s, Bagram is the largest military air base in Afghanistan. It was a primary center for U.S. and allied forces for cargo, helicopter, and support flights. It has a 3,000-meter runway capable of handling heavy bomber and cargo aircraft.
Hamid Karzai International Airport	Kabul, Kabul Province	Built by engineers from the Soviet Union in 1960 and recently expanded by members of NATO countries and Japan. It is a dual-use airport, civilian and military, the primary hub for international civilian flights. It serves as the home of the AAF 1st Wing and includes state-of-the-art hangar facilities, as well as operations, logistics, billeting, dining, and recreational facilities. It is also used by the USAF.
Khwaja Abdullah Ansari International Airport	Herat, Herat Province	Built by engineers from the United States in the 1960s. It is the primary civil airport for the western portion of the country, but also houses military aircraft.
Jalalabad Airport	Jalalabad, Nangarhar Province	
Kunduz Airport	Kunduz, Kunduz Province	
Maulana Jalaluddin Balkhi International Airport	Mazar-i-Sharif, Balkh Province	Expanded recently by Bundeswehr and Turkey, it is a dual-use airport serving the northern and central portions of the country.
Shindand Air Base	Shindand District, Herat Province	Built by the Soviets in 1961. Home to the AAF 3rd Wing, it is the second largest military air base in the country, located just south of Herat with significant military aircraft shelters and facilities. Its location made it a prime candidate as a training base for the AAF.

== Installations and other facilities ==
Type	Installation	District/Valley	Province	Opened	Closed	Corps	Brigade	Kandak	Notes
Multi National Base	Tarin Kot	Tarinkot District	Urozgan		Present	205th 'Atul' (Hero)	4th		
Camp	Garmsir	Garmsir District	Helmand			215th 'Maiwand'	1st	HQ	Located near to Camp Dwyer
Camp	Hero		Kandahar		Present	205th 'Atul' (Hero)	1st	HQ	1st Brigade & Headquarters; Kandahar Regional Military Hospital
Camp	Marmal	Mazar-i-Sharif	Balkh			209th 'Shaheen' (Falcon)	1st		
Camp	Parsa		Khost			203rd 'Tandar' (Thunder)	1st		
Camp	Shaheen	Mazar-i-Sharif	Balkh			209th 'Shaheen' (Falcon)	1st	HQ	1st Brigade & Headquarters
Camp	Shorabak	Nahri Saraj District	Helmand		Present	215th 'Maiwand'	3rd		Formerly part of Camp Bastion
Camp	Zafar		Herat	2005	Present	207th 'Zafar' (Victory)	1st	HQ	1st Brigade & Headquarters.
COP	Miri Andar		Ghazni		Present				
Contingency Location	New Antonik		Helmand		2021				Handed to Afghan Forces during May 2021. Previously Camp Shorab. Next to Camp Shorabak.
FOB	Anaconda		Oruzgan		Present				
FOB	Connelly		Nangarhar		Present				
FOB	Delaram	Delaram	Nimruz			215th 'Maiwand'	2nd		
FOB	Juno								
FOB	Masum Ghar	Panjwayi District	Kandahar		Present				
FOB	Oqab		Kabul		Present				
FOB	Orgun-E		Paktika		Present				
FOB	Ouellette	Gereshk District	Helmand	October 2013	Present				
FOB	Pasab	Zharay			Present	205th 'Atul' (Hero)	3rd		
Depot	Qarga Lake		Kabul					8th Division ammunition depot suffered series of explosions, August 1986.	
FOB	Robinson	Helmand River Valley	Helmand	2006	Present				
FOB	Rushmore	Sharana	Paktika		Present	203rd 'Tandar' (Thunder)	2nd	4th	
FOB	Sperwan Ghar	Panjwayi District	Kandahar		Present				
Military; Academy	National Military Academy of Afghanistan		Kabul	2005	Present				
Operational; Base	Fenty								
PB	Clifton		Helmand	March 2013	Present				
PB	Jahan Zeb		Helmand	February 2012	Present			4th	
PB	Mirage	Musa Qala District	Helmand	2008	Present				
Palace	Presidential Palace		Kabul			201st 'Selab' (Flood)	1st		
Tactical; Base	Gamberi								
Training; Center	Kabul Military Training Center		Kabul		Present				
Training; Center	Camp Morehead		Kabul	2006	Present				Located at Rish Khor camp. ANA Commando Brigade
			Pul-e-Charkhi			201st 'Selab' (Flood)	2nd		
			Nangarhar			201st 'Selab' (Flood)	3rd		
			Nuristan			201st 'Selab' (Flood)	4th		
		Qalat	Zabul			205th 'Atul' (Hero)	2nd		
			Farah			207th 'Zafar' (Victory)	2nd		
		Shindand	Herat			207th 'Zafar' (Victory)			Commandoes
		Chesma-e-Dozakh	Badghis			207th 'Zafar' (Victory)	3rd		
		Khost	Khost			203rd 'Tandar' (Thunder)	1st		
		Ghazni	Ghazni			203rd 'Tandar' (Thunder)	3rd		
		Kunduz	Kunduz			209th 'Shaheen' (Falcon)	2nd		

== Former installations ==
Type	Installation	District/Valley	Province	Opened	Closed	Corps	Brigade	Kandak	Notes
Military Academy	Harbi Pohantoon (Military University)		Kabul Province		1992				The military academy for the Afghan Army until 1992

== See also ==
- List of airports in Afghanistan
- List of NATO installations in Afghanistan
