= Jan Mohammad Akhund =

Afghan Taliban fighter and politician

- ملا جان محمد اخند

Deputy Commander of the 217 Omari Corps
- Incumbent
- Assumed office 14 March 2022
- Prime Minister: Mohammad Hassan Akhund
- Leader: Hibatullah Akhundzada
- Preceded by: Qari Mohammad Ismail Turkman

Deputy Governor of Takhar Province
- In office 22 November 2021 – 14 March 2022
- Succeeded by: Haji Kazim
- Leader: Hibatullah Akhundzada

Personal details
- Party: Taliban
- Profession: Politician

Mullah Jan Mohammad Akhund is an Afghan Taliban politician and soldier who is currently serving as Deputy Commander of the 217 Omari Corps since 14 March 2022. Akhund has also served as Deputy Governor of Takhar Province from 22 November 2021 to 14 March 2022.
