= 209th Corps (Afghanistan) =

- Emblem of the 209th Corps
- Active: 23 September 2004 –14 August 2021
- Country: Afghanistan
- Branch: Afghan National Army
- Type: Corps
- Headquarters: Mazar-i-Sharif Province, Afghanistan
- Nickname: Shaheen (Falcon)
- Engagements: War in Afghanistan (2001–2021)

Commanders
- Last commander: General Zabihullah Mohmand

Insignia
- Corps Flag

The 209th 'Shaheen' (Falcon) Corps was a corps, or military district, of the Afghan National Army. Its headquarters, Camp Shaheen, was at Mazar-i-Sharif, Balkh Province. It worked closely with the German-led Resolute Support Mission TAAC North, and had its 1st Brigade at Mazar-i-Sharif and a Second Brigade at Kunduz. A United States Army Corps of Engineers solicitation for Kunduz headquarters facilities for the Second Brigade was issued in March 2008. The corps was supported by the Mazar-i-Sharif Regional Support Squadron of the AAF, equipped with eight helicopters: four transport to support the Corps' commando battalion, two attack, and two medical transport helicopters. In October 2015, as a response to the Battle of Kunduz, reports came that a new division would be formed in the area.

During the Taliban offensive in 2021, the Corps was charged with the security of Northern Afghanistan. On 14 August 2021, the Corps along with its commander, Zabihullah Mohmand, surrendered to the Taliban.

== 2017 Camp Shaheen attack ==
On 21 April 2017, Taliban fighters attacked Camp Shaheen killing at least 160 Afghan soldiers and wounding many others. This made the attack the bloodiest in the conflict with the Taliban since 2001 when they were removed from power.

== Taliban offensive in 2021 ==
During the Taliban offensive in 2021, the Corps was charged with security of northern Afghanistan. On 9 August, the Corps had its commander replaced by General Zabihullah Mohmand and it was tasked with defense of Mazar-i-Sharif, which was the only city under the control of government in Kabul in Northern Afghanistan. On 14 August, the Corps along with its commander surrendered to the Taliban. The pro-government militia also surrendered and the two long-time anti-Taliban warlords, namely Abdul Rashid Dostum and Atta Muhammad Nur fled to Uzbekistan. Abas Ebrahimzada, a lawmaker from the Balkh province, said that in Mazar-i-Sharif, the national army surrendered first which caused the pro-government militia and other forces to lose morale and surrender in the face of Taliban assault on the city.

== See also ==
- List of Afghan Armed Forces installations
- List of NATO installations in Afghanistan
- List of Afghan National Army Corps:
  - 201st Corps
  - 203rd Corps
  - 205th Corps
  - 207th Corps
  - 215th Corps
  - 217th Corps
