= National Military Academy of Afghanistan =

Four-year officer training institution

- آکادمی ملی نظامی افغانستان د افغانستان ملي پوځي اکاډمي
- Type: Military Academy
- Active: February 2005–August 2021
- President: Major General Shir Mohammad Zazai
- Undergraduates: 1502
- Location: Kabul, Afghanistan
- Colors: Purple
- Website: web.archive.org/web/20061214030706/http://www.nmaa.edu.af

The National Military Academy of Afghanistan (NMAA) (Pashto: د افغانستان ملي پوځي اکاډمي Dari: آکادمی نظامی ملی افغانستان) was one of three academic institutions of the Kabul National Defense University. It was a four-year military development institution dedicated to commissioning officers for the Afghan National Army (ANA) and the Afghan Air Force (AAF). The mission of the NMAA was to produce officers for the Afghan Armed Forces that also have a four-year college level bachelor's degree. The academy was based upon the United States Military Academy and United States Air Force Academy. After the fall of Kabul on August 15, 2021, to the Taliban, and the simultaneous collapse of the Afghan National Army and Afghan Air Force the same day, the Academy was officially shut down.

== Academics ==
All cadets who graduated from NMAA receive a bachelor's degree, which are being offered in English language, Civil Engineering, Computer Science, Management, and Law (Islamic, statutory and customary).

All cadets studied English for four years based on the American Language Course written by the Defense Language Institute English Language Center. Instruction also included conversation classes and interactive multimedia instruction.

Cadets participated in morning physical fitness training and afternoon sports intramurals as part of their officer training.

== Military training ==
All cadets were commissioned as second lieutenants in the Afghan National Army or Afghan Air Force in one of its branch schools. Currently the emphasis is on training the ANA instructors so that they will be able to continue training other recruits in the future. From mid-2010 to mid-2011, NMAA expanded the number of schools from eight to twelve. The current list of schools is Armor, Artillery, Human Resources, Signal, Infantry, Engineer, Legal, Military Police, Logistics, Religious/Cultural Affairs, Intelligence and Finance.

=== Armor School ===
France and Greece ran the ANA Armor School. They were primarily responsible for mentoring the mechanized brigade of the ANA, namely the 3rd Brigade of the 201st Corps stationed in Jalalabad and the 3rd Brigade of the 111th Capital Division stationed in Kabul. 3 - 111 Brigade "was declared by many Marines as the best brigade in the entire ANA." The ANAs mechanised units had limited stocks of vehicles. In 2005, they received 10 M113A2s. They also have limited stocks of older Russian armor including T-55 and T-62 main battle tanks. In 2009, it was reported that the 3rd Brigade of the 201st Corps was being operated as infantry due to a lack of maintenance capability for its heavy equipment. The 207th Corps also operates a mechanised Brigade, though its stock of equipment and abilities are unknown. As of 2011, the NATO training mission in Afghanistan reported continuing fielding of M113s to the ANA.

=== Artillery School ===
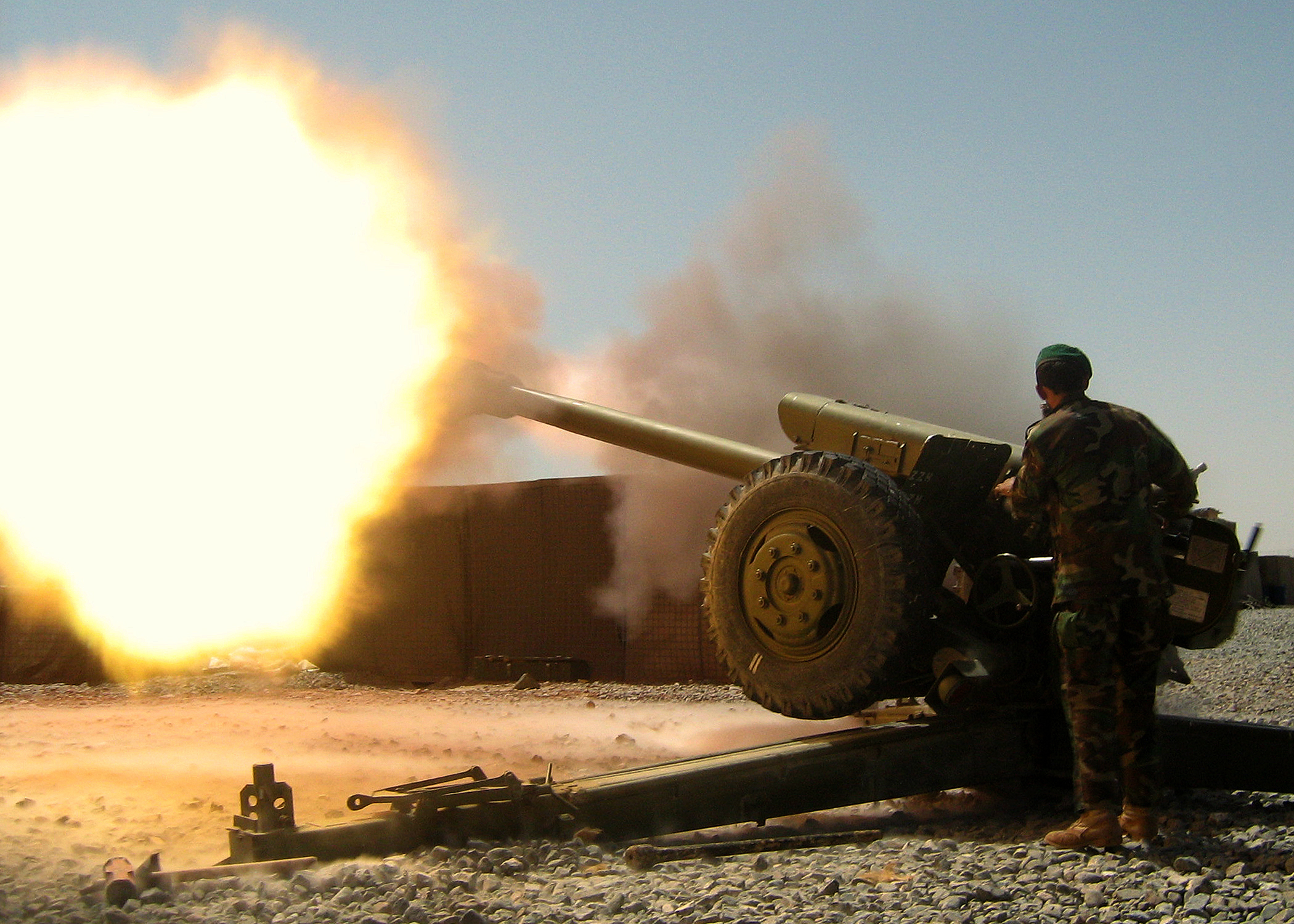
An artilleryman from the Afghan National Army's 205th Corps fires a round from a D-30 artillery piece during an indirect fire support mission, Sept. 9, 2007. For the past 10 months, U.S. embedded mentors have been helping train Afghans on Forward Operating Base Wolverine in Zabul province.

Opened in October 2010, the Artillery School as of 2011 was still rated as requiring ISAF oversight in training and support. The cadets undertake training using the 122mm D30 Howitzer due to their simplicity and the fact that some were left behind by the Soviet Ground Forces. The D-30 has an effective range of 15.4 km.

The Artillery School will offer nine different courses for ANA soldiers in the ranks of E-1 through O-4. Courses include the artillery captains career course, the artillery basic officer course, three basic courses, three squad leader courses, and a platoon sergeant course. Course instruction is broken down into three key disciplines: fire direction, fire support and guns. Additionally, students will receive instruction on artillery tactics, command leadership and management, gun-mounted vehicle movement in battery formation, radio procedures, map reading and navigation. Each cadet also receives literacy and numeracy training of approximately 68 hours.

In April 2011, the school graduated its first class of 55 students from their 11-week basic artillery course. They then entered a further nine weeks training at the Consolidated Fielding Centre prior to joining combat units. At any one time the school typically has 440 students undertaking one of its 9 courses. the aim is to provide artillery training to 2100 officers and soldiers within 12 months, which translates to approximately 23 artillery batteries for the ANA. In modern armies, an artillery battery typically has 6 - 8 howitzers commanded by a Captain or Major.

The Artillery School is partnered with the U.S. Army Fires Center of Excellence at Fort Sill, Oklahoma. As the cadets are sent to the field the training mission will convert to one of maintaining readiness and improving on skills. While some D-30 Howitzers were left in the country by the Soviet Army, the exact number in ANA possession is unknown. From August to December 2011 the ANA took delivery of 60 D-30s under the NATO - Howitzer Donation Program from the Armed Forces of Bosnia and Herzegovina. Advanced indirect fire training is now a focus of the training of the Artillery School to enable them to support infantry operations.

As of September 2013 the ANA is in possession of 152 D30 howitzers, the supply of which is being coordinated by Picatinny Arsenal, the US military center for excellence in Artillery. This will rise to 204 systems eventually. They also have to provide training on the operation and maintenance of the weapon system, and they have established a refurbishment capability in Afghanistan that is allowing Afghan workers to refurbish additional howitzers.

The Artillery School has recently started to train ANA cadets and soldiers in the use of the American 155mm M198 howitzer, which is meant to be phased out of operation by the US and Australian military. This will be a significant increase in capabilities for an ANA artillery battery as the M198 has an increased range of 22.4 km and can fire a broader range of ammunition types including a Rocket Assisted Projectile which increases its range to 30 km. The US has already supplied excess M198 to the modernisation of the Iraqi military.

=== Signal School ===
The National Military Academy Signal School opened in 2010 is based in the Kabul Military Training Centre to the north east of Kabul. The school was led by mentors from Finland, Sweden, Norway, United Kingdom, Canada and the United States who supplied signals instructors. Each student partakes in a six-week course of instruction and literacy training.

The school's role has since evolved into developing several courses for senior NCOs, training Afghan Army Corps headquarters signals staff, and teaching specialist skills such as cabling, computer networking, maintenance, communications planning and satellite systems.

In 2011 a new signal school has also been planned at Camp Shaheen near Mazar-e-Sharif in northern Afghanistan.

=== Engineer School ===
The Primary role of the Engineer School is to supply suitably qualified cadets and soldiers to the newly formed ANA Combat Support Organisations.

== Personal character ==
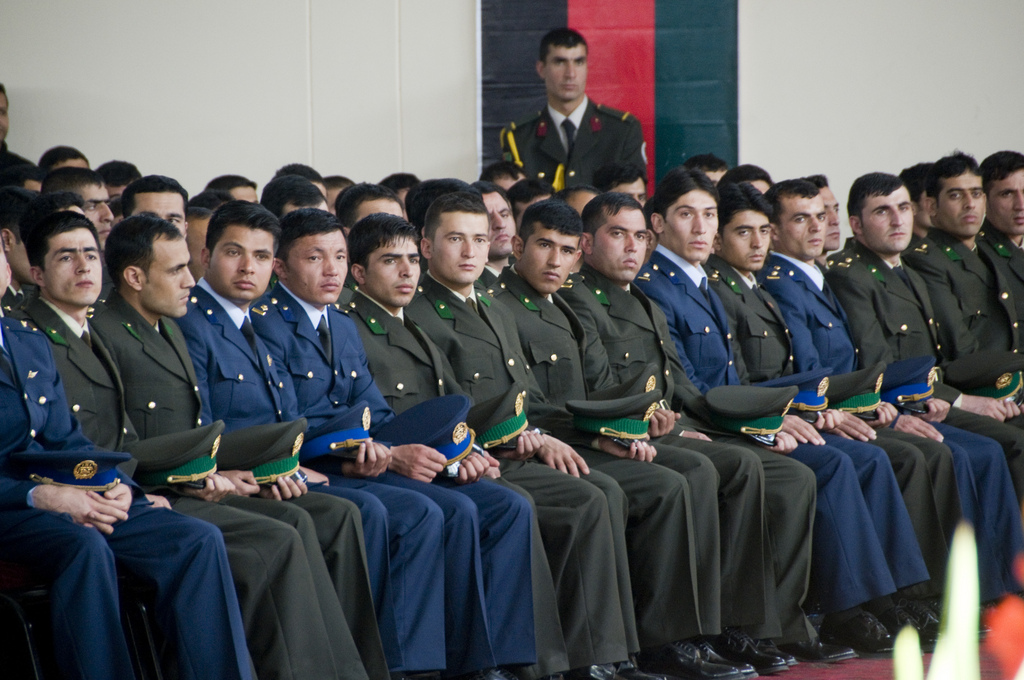
The class of 2010 listens as President Hamid Karzai gives a speech during their graduation ceremony in March 2010

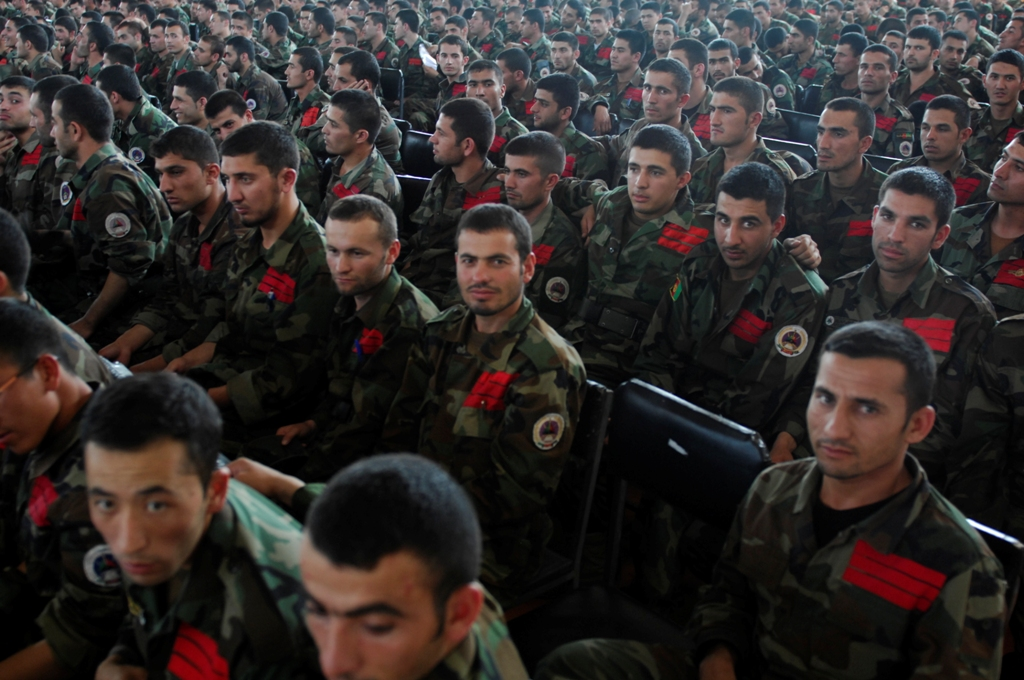
Cadets and instructors

Traditionally, military leaders in Afghanistan have been loyal to either the national leader or, more often, their local tribal leader. Their allegiances have been to their tribe, to their province, to the country, and their religion, in that order. The academy had undertaken the task of developing the cadet's loyalty to the 2004 Constitution of Afghanistan, rather than any one individual. Another philosophy was training the cadets to understand that there are circumstances when it is acceptable to disobey orders when that order is in conflict with the national constitution.

Cadets are bound to an honor code in which they pledge not to cheat, lie, steal or conspire to deceive.

== Role of the Coalition ==
The United States has taken the lead in providing advisors and funding to the Academy through Combined Security Transition Command - Afghanistan (CSTC-A). The team consists of 6 to 20 members at any given time with the responsibility of mentoring academy leadership, staff sections, academic departments and sports teams.

Turkey provided a team of academic mentors to the academy and had assisted in establishing a Turkish Language program, computer science department and mathematics department. They have also provided funding for the establishment of recreational facilities.

France and Germany had provided some assistance in developing language courses at the academy.

Unlike most embedded training teams, the coalition teams present at the academy frequently have female officers and NCOs in order to demonstrate the capabilities of women in the military.

== Female enrollment ==
The academy had about 40 female students enrolled in medical studies. This co-ed major enabled females to study on campus, although they are housed in dormitories at a non-military university in the area. The academy anticipated having 10% female population enrolled as cadets by 2017.

== Relationship with foreign military academies ==
Afghan military leaders conducted an international study in which they visited Kara Harp Okulu (the Turkish Military Academy); Royal Military Academy Sandhurst, the service academy of the United Kingdom; and the United States Military Academy at West Point.

The Afghans selected the U.S. to be the model for their academy. Afghan military leaders visited West Point twice, in the spring of 2004 and 2005, to understand how West Point integrates the developmental activities in the Academic, Military, Physical and Moral-Ethical areas to produce graduates who are prepared for the challenges of leading soldiers.

The United States Air Force Academy was providing mentors for their developing Air Force program.

== Reconstruction ==
The site of the academy is at the previous Air Academy that was established by the Soviet Union when they occupied Afghanistan through the 1980s. The site was nearly destroyed during the years of civil war and the coalition invasion of October 2001.

The United States and Turkey have taken the lead in reconstructing the site while planning and developing the future site of the academy in the Qargheh section of Kabul. The estimated cost of the reconstruction is around $100 million.

Cadets at West Point assisted in the creation of a distributed application for the purpose of managing grades for the Afghan cadets. The building officially shut down on August 15, 2021.

== See also ==
- List of universities in Afghanistan
- List of Afghan Armed Forces installations
