= 2017 Camp Shaheen attack =

Taliban attack on a northern Afghan military base

Coordinates: 36°42′N 67°07′E

- Part of the War in Afghanistan (2001–2021)
- Afghan National Army soldiers in Camp Shaheen in 2011
Date	21 April 2017
Location	Mazar-e-Sharif, Afghanistan
Result	Afghan Minister of Defense and Chief of Staff of the Afghan National Army both resign three days after the attack

Belligerents
Taliban: Haqqani network	Afghanistan: 209th Corps

Commanders and leaders
Mullah Taj Mir Jawad; Qari Abdul Raouf Zakir	Unknown

Strength
Unknown, 10 fighters (Taliban claim)	3,000 soldiers

Casualties and losses
All killed	140–256 Afghan soldiers killed, 160+ injured

On 21 April 2017, at least ten Taliban fighters attacked Camp Shaheen, headquarters of the 209th Corps of the Afghan National Army (ANA), near Mazar-i-Sharif, Balkh Province. The death toll was unclear—official Afghan government statements said about 140 people were killed and 160 injured, while media reports said as many as 256 were dead. The attack was the deadliest on an Afghan military base since the beginning of the war.

== Attack ==
A squad of ten Taliban fighters, wearing army uniforms and driving two Ford Ranger military vehicles, drove into the base, claiming to have wounded soldiers in need of urgent medical care. The base was a compound for the 209th Corps of the Afghan National Army. A witness said the attackers passed unchallenged through an outer checkpoint, killed two guards at the next one, and destroyed a third one with rocket-propelled grenades (RPG).

At the time of the attack, most soldiers were unarmed, attending Friday prayers at a mosque on the base and eating at a restaurant. A soldier who witnessed the attack said "It was a chaotic scene and I didn't know what to do [...] There was gunfire and explosions everywhere." Another soldier described how an attacker had set up a machine gun through the window of a truck "and shot everyone in his way." It was the single deadliest known attack on an Afghan military base in the course of the war.

According to the Taliban, four of the attackers had served as soldiers, who had been stationed at the base, and knew its layout. Two of the attackers detonated their suicide vests in the mosque and eight others were killed in the ensuing gun battle. It took about five hours for security forces, who responded to the attack, to kill the militants and secure the base. 140 soldiers were killed and 160 wounded in the massacre, according to provincial official Mohammad Ibrahim Khair Andesh. On 25 April, Afghan news agency TOLOnews reported 256 soldiers had been killed, and that the government was withholding the higher death toll. A Taliban statement released after the attack said at least 500 Afghan soldiers had been injured or killed.

== Reaction ==
=== Afghanistan ===
Afghan President Ashraf Ghani visited the base on the day after the attack and declared a national day of mourning, while provincial governor Atta Muhammad Nur said an investigation into possible inside help the Taliban received had begun and that "we will avenge the blood of their children." On 24 April, Minister of Defense Abdullah Habibi and Army Chief of Staff General Qadam Shah Shahim both resigned, while President Ghani named new leaders for four Army corps, among them the 209th.

=== United States ===
US military spokesman John Thomas said the attack was "significant," and commended security forces for bringing the "atrocity to an end," while General John W. Nicholson Jr., overall commander of coalition forces, said, "The attack on the 209th Corps today shows the barbaric nature of the Taliban".

The New York Times reported American military officials said they had intelligence that showed the Haqqani network was behind the attack. One senior United States military official said the intelligence showed the attack had been planned over 4 to 6 months and was too sophisticated and "calculated" to have been carried out by the Taliban. The Haqqani network is part of the Taliban and has become an integral part of its leadership.

=== Taliban ===
Taliban spokesman Zabihullah Mujahid said the attack was retaliation for the death of Abdul Salam in northern Afghanistan. and released a video allegedly showing the fighters who took part in the attack, dressed in Afghan army uniforms.
