= 219 Omer-e-Salis Division =

- Active: 14 February 2022 - present
- Country: Afghanistan
- Branch: Afghan Army
- Role: Counterinsurgency
- Size: 3.000 troops ca.
- Part of: 207 Al-Farooq Corps

Commanders
- Current commander: Mullah Hafez Mujahid

The 219 Omer-e-Salis Division, also spelled Omar Salis Division, is a military formation of the Afghan Army established on 14 February 2022.

The 219 Omer-e-Salis Division, part of 207 Al-Farooq Corps, is deployed in Badakhshan Province bordering Tajikistan, Pakistan and China. According to official statements, the Division is to execute counter-insurgency tasks.

The actual strength of the 219 Omer-e-Salis Division has not been disclosed. According to Radio Liberty, the Division is thought to include about 3,000 soldiers.
