= Marshal Fahim National Defense University =

Military academy in Kabul, Afghanistan

Coordinates: 34°32′07.0″N 69°04′23.8″E

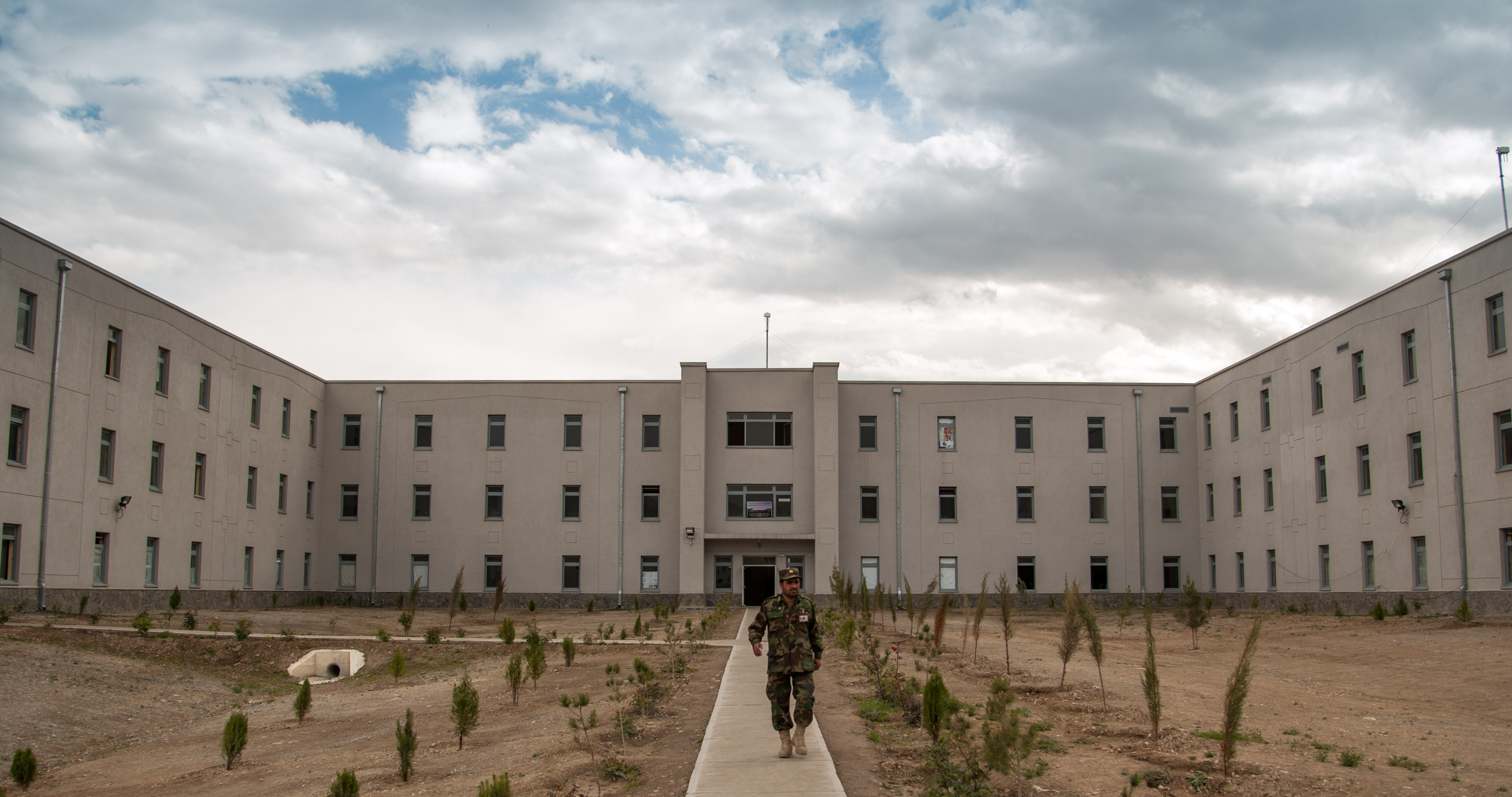
- Established: 1 April 2013
- Location: Kabul, Afghanistan

Marshal Fahim National Defense University (MFNDU) is a military university located in Kabul, the capital city of Afghanistan. Established in 2005, the university is named after the late Marshal Mohammad Fahim, an Afghan political and military leader who served as the first vice president of Afghanistan from 2004 until his death in 2014.

MFNDU educates and trains military officers, senior civil servants, and professionals from various government and non-government organizations in Afghanistan and other partner nations.

MFNDU provides undergraduate, graduate, and postgraduate programs in various fields, including military science, defense studies, strategic studies, leadership and management, international relations, law, and engineering. The university also offers short-term courses, workshops, and seminars for professionals in specific fields, conducts research on various security and defense-related issues, and publishes academic papers, reports, and policy briefs.

The faculty at Marshal Fahim National Defense University comprises military officers, civil servants, and scholars.

== Geography ==
The university's campus in Qargha is spread over an area of 400 acres. The campus includes academic and administrative buildings, student dormitories, faculty housing, sports facilities, and a library.

The key to Qargha's historical and strategic importance is its geographical position, lying on the western outskirts of Kabul, a low plateau dominated to the north and west by a crescent-shaped range of hills. To the southwest the pass leading to Wardak, Ghazni and Kandahar form a deep V shape cut into the mountains; to the west lie the Paghman mountains, the Paghman plateau and the road leading into the Hazarajat; and to the north, beyond the ridge, the Kabul valley extends to Bagram, Charikar and the passes at Parwan and into the Panjshir Valley.

== History ==
=== Ancient history ===
The valley in which the university is situated has witnessed the passage of Afghanistan's invaders throughout recorded history, from Mongols, Alexander the Great in 326 BC to Genghis Khan in 1222 AD, followed by Tamerlane (Timur) in 1380 and Babur in 1504. On three separate occasions three hundred years later, the shepherds grazing their flocks on the hillsides would have seen the British advancing up the valley from the East, Robert Sale in 1839, George Pollock in 1842 and Frederick Roberts in 1879.

=== Royal period ===
The modern history of Qargha begins in the early 1880s, when Abdur Rahman Khan, the founder of the regular Afghan army, established a logistics base in Qargha to sustain its operations in the Hazarajat region. The camp was expanded considerably during the reign of Abbul Rahman's grandson, Emir Amānullāh Khān in the 1920s when he invited advisors from the Turkish and German armies to train his army in order to assert his newly won independence from British control. It became the home of the Kabul Division which was essentially the Emir's strategic reserve. The camp performed this function until the time of the Soviet occupation in 1979.

=== Soviet period ===
The Soviet occupation of Qargha began in 1980. They, too, used the site as a logistics depot, digging ordnance storage bunkers into the northern hillside of the camp, many of which are still in use by the ANA. By the mid-1980s Qargha was occupied by around 12,000 joint Soviet-Afghan troops, with the Afghan soldiers being from the 8th Infantry Division. Despite the huge number of troops on the site, the Mujahideen succeeded in launching an infiltration attack which destroyed a large part of the ordnance depot with a large explosion which could be heard across Kabul city. The attack caused several months of disruption to Soviet supply lines as they struggled to rebuild the depot.

=== Massoud period ===
The decision of Abdul Rashid Dostum to move his Jowzjani militia out of Qargha to join Ahmad Shah Massoud’s coalition of warlords in the north and northeast of the country contributed to the downfall of Mohammad Najibullah's government. Massoud sited a number of Mujahideen troops at Qargha, and he was a frequent visitor to the site, staying in the commander's white house on the hillside, which is now known as 'Massoud House'.

=== First Taliban period ===
Massoud's forces pulled out of Qargha in 1996. The installations left over from the Royal Army and Soviet periods made it an ideal site for the Taliban, who moved in and used it as a training and ordnance depot. They were still in occupation during American air strikes during the Post 9/11 United States Invasion of Afghanistan offensive in October 2001, obliterating most of the buildings.

=== Islamic Republic period ===
Qargha remained heavily damaged until the decision was made to make it the site of the planned Afghan National Defense University. American contractors moved in mid-2008 to clear the site, which previously served a variety of military roles since the Soviet–Afghan War.

When building work was completed, the Qargha site became the center for the training of the majority of future officers and non-commissioned officers in the Afghan Armed Forces. Officer training took place at both the ANDU site and east of the city at the Kabul Military Training Center. NMAA was previously located to the north of the city close to the Kabul International Airport but moved to the ANDU site in 2012.

A cornerstone-laying ceremony was conducted in April 2010 and the construction was completed in 2013. The total cost for the first phase of work was $200 million. Institutions that are located at ADU include the National Military Academy of Afghanistan.

In April 2014, the university was renamed the Defense University of Marshal Fahim in honour of the former Vice President of Afghanistan, Mohammed Fahim who died of a heart attack on 9 March 2014. The ANDU has been commanded by Major General Jalinda Shah since May 2014.

=== Second Taliban Period ===
After the Taliban took over Kabul and Afghanistan, and a majority of professors fled Afghanistan during the 2021 Fall of Kabul. Unlike in the Afghan Civil War in the 1990s, the university was not converted into a non-academic military base or closed.

== Institutions ==
=== National Military Academy ===
The National Military Academy of Afghanistan under American coalition occupation was modeled on the United States Military Academy and the United States Air Force Academy. It was designed to train cadets to produce well-educated and professional officers for each of the disciplines of the ANA and AAF. Schools include Armor, Artillery, Human Resources, Signal, Infantry, Engineer, Legal, Military Police, Logistics, Religious/Cultural Affairs, Intelligence and Finance.

NMAA moved to the ANDU site in Qargha upon completion of its new campus in 2012. It was previously located in the old Air Academy established by the Soviet Union to the north of Kabul beside Kabul International Airport.

NMAA cadets study both military and academic subjects for a total of 4 years and are awarded a degree from ANDU before commissioning into the ANA as Second Lieutenants. Female cadets have studied at the NMAA since 2011 and the first intake of NMAA-trained female officers graduated in 2015.

=== Afghan National Army Officer Academy (ANAOA) ===
The ANA Officer Academy was also referred to in Afghanistan as ANAOA and the Junior Officer Academy. It was reported as early as 2006 that the United Kingdom would take a primary role in the creation of an Officer Academy for the ANA and AAF. Nicknamed "Sandhurst in the Sand", the Academy was to be modelled on the Royal Military Academy Sandhurst. This was supported by the then-head of the ANA, General Sher Mohammad Karimi, who attended Sandhurst himself in the 1960s.

On 29 March 2012 UK Defence Secretary Philip Hammond met with Afghan General Abdul Rahim Wardak and signed a statement of intent on developing the academy. The UK would provide approximately 75% of the training staff for the new Academy and would be involved in its running long after the 2014 deadline for pulling out the majority of troops. Afghan officer cadets undertook training at Sandhurst in order to improve the standard of officers in the ANA.

On 19 July 2012 on a visit to Kabul the British Prime Minister David Cameron signed a Memorandum of Understanding for the UK to provide mentors and advisors to the Afghan National Army Officer Academy. New Zealand will also contribute support to the ANA Officer Academy.

The first concrete steps were taken 10 Oct 12 to start the construction of the academy with a ground breaking ceremony attended by a number of dignitaries including the ANA Chief of General Staff General Shir Mohammad Karimi, Her Majesty's Ambassador to Afghanistan Sir Richard Stagg, ISAF Deputy Commander Lt. Gen. Adrian Bradshaw and Commander of the NATO Training Mission (NTM-A) Lt Gen Bolger.

The ANA Officer Academy accepted its first intake of 270 students selected from approximately 10,000 initial applicants in October 2013. Training is being delivered by a staff of Afghan officers and soldiers in cooperation with a team of mentors from the United Kingdom, Australia, New Zealand, Denmark and Norway.

The ANA Officer Academy started recruiting its first intake of women in February 2014. Female staff will receive instructor training with their male colleagues, and be mentored by a coalition female mentoring team. Female candidates will attend a two-day selection test on the Qargha site in April 2014 and a platoon (balook) of 30 female officer cadets will start training alongside the third male intake in June 2014.

=== Sergeant Major Academy ===
The Sergeant Major Academy is currently part of the Kabul Military Training Center. It trains male and female soldiers at the rank of E7 staff sergeant in order to prepare them for service as Sergeant Majors at the ranks of E8 and E9 in the ANA and AAF. The Academy will move to the ANDU site in Qargha on completion of the Phase 2 build project.

=== Non-Commissioned Officer (NCO) Academy ===
The Non-Commissioned Officer Academy will undertake training of soldiers from all disciplines up to the level of staff sergeant.

=== Defense Institute of Foreign Languages ===
The Institute will deliver training in Foreign Languages for individuals posted into Defence diplomacy billets.

=== Women's participation program ===
In April 2019, at Marshal Fahim National Defense University (MFNDU), the women's participation program (WPP) was awarded 5 buildings at 3 sites. Three gymnasiums and a child care center were constructed for the program. The sites were appropriately shielded for the privacy of the participants. The gymnasiums and child care center contain up-to-date equipment and materials.

== See also ==
- List of universities in Afghanistan
