= Abdul Razzaq Akhund =

Afghan Taliban politician and fighter

Abdul Razzaq Akhund عبدالرزاق آخند

Chiefs of Staff of the 207 Al-Farooq Corps
- Incumbent
- Assumed office 4 March 2022
- Prime Minister: Mohammad Hassan Akhund
- Leader: Hibatullah Akhundzada
- Preceded by: Abdul Rahman Haqqani
- Leader: Hibatullah Akhundzada

Personal details
- Party: Taliban
- Profession: Politician

Mullah Abdul Razzaq Faizullah Akhund is an Afghan Taliban politician and soldier who is currently serving as Chiefs of Staff of the 207 Al-Farooq Corps since 4 March 2022.
