= Abdul Raof Arghandiwal =

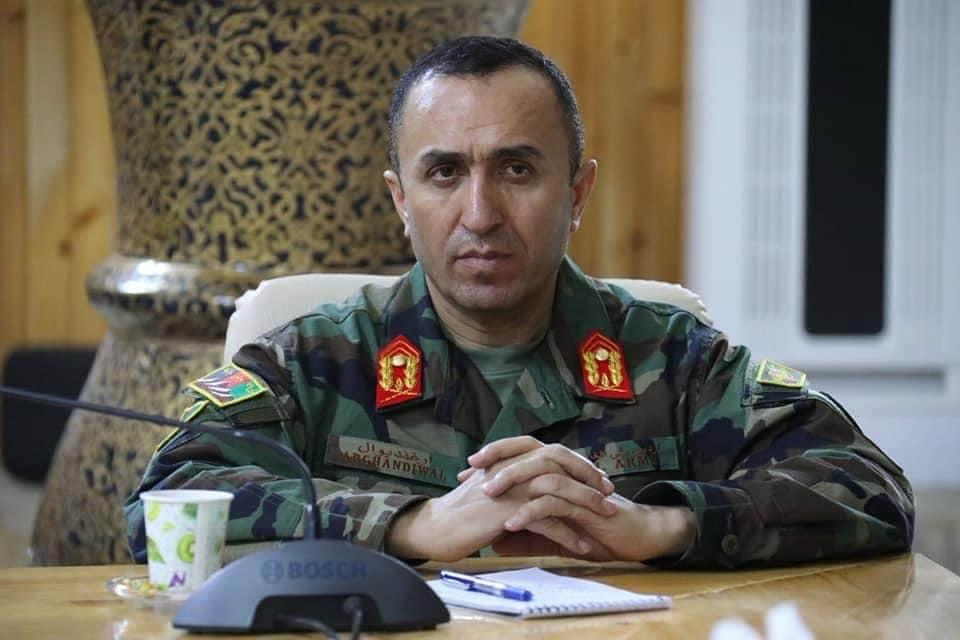
- Born: 1974 (age 51–52); Tishkan District, Badakhshan Province, Afghanistan
- Military career
- Allegiance: Afghanistan
- Branch: Afghan National Army
- Rank: Major General
- Unit: 207th Corps
- Commands: • 2nd Battalion, 111th Division • 207th Corps, Herat

Abdul Raof Arghandiwal (born 1974) is a former officer of the Afghan National Army who held the rank of major general. He served as commander of the 207th Corps in Herat, Afghanistan, and earlier commanded the 2nd Battalion of the 111th Division.

== Early life and education ==
Arghandiwal was born in 1974 in Tishkan District, Badakhshan Province. He attended the U.S. Marine Corps Command and Staff College, graduating in 2011.

== Military career ==
=== Command of the 2nd Battalion ===
In 2013, Arghandiwal commanded the 2nd Battalion of the 111th Army Division during operations in Wardoj District, Badakhshan. The campaign sought to remove terrorist groups, including the Taliban, from the area.

In 2013, Arghandiwal commanded the 2nd Battalion of the 111th Army Division during operations in Wardoj District, Badakhshan. The campaign sought to remove terrorist groups, including the Taliban, from the area. He also led operations in Kohi Safi District of Parwan Province, Dangam District of Kunar Province, and in Kunduz Province as part of counterterrorism efforts aimed at restoring government control and local security.

=== Command of the 207th Corps ===
Arghandiwal later served as commander of the 207th Corps, based in Herat. During this period, he was involved in overseeing security operations in western Afghanistan. Following the U.S. withdrawal in 2021, he was cited in reports regarding Russian efforts to recruit former Afghan special forces.

=== Chief of Staff ===
Arghandiwal also served as Chief of Staff to the Afghan Minister of Defense.

== Contributions to Afghan security ==
As a senior officer, Arghandiwal held leadership roles during a period of heightened conflict in Afghanistan, particularly in the western provinces.
