= 207 Al-Farooq Corps =

- Pashto: ۲۰۷ الفاروق قول اردو
- Founded: October 2021
- Country: Afghanistan
- Allegiance: Islamic Emirate of Afghanistan
- Branch: Afghan Army
- Type: Corps
- Nickname: Al-Farooq

Commanders
- Chief of Staff: Abdul Razzaq Akhund
- Commander: Mohammad Zarif Muzaffar
- Deputy Commander: Abdul Shakur Baryalai

The 207 Al-Farooq Corps (Pashto: ۲۰۷ الفاروق قول اردو; Dari: قول اردوی ۲۰۷ الفاروق) is one of the eight corps of the Islamic Emirate Army established in October 2021 and headquartered in Herat. The current Chief of Staff is Abdul Razzaq Akhund.

The Islamic Republic of Afghanistan-era corps it replaced was known as the 207th 'Zafar' Corps and was a part of the Afghan National Army.

== Command Staff ==
Chiefs of Staff
Chief of Staff	Period	Notes	Ref(s)
Abdul Rahman Haqqani	4 October 2021 – 4 March 2022		
Abdul Razzaq Akhund	4 March 2022 – Present		
Commanders
Commander	Period	Notes	Ref(s)
Mohammad Zarif Muzaffar	4 October 2021 – Present		
Deputy Commanders
Deputy Commander	Period	Notes	Ref(s)
Abdul Shakur Baryalai	4 October 2021 – Present		

== See also ==
- 219 Omer-e-Salis Division
