= Lancaster Plan =

The Lancaster Plan was a British programme to support the military of Afghanistan, championed by Brigadier General A. S. Lancaster. The program began in 1945, and was made unnecessary by the end of British rule of India in 1947.

During that period, the British provided the Afghan military 30 million rupees in materiel, at half price and on easy finance terms. As the plan continued, the British provided military officers to train Afghan troops, and trained Afghan officers in India, as well as trained pilots and provided pilots to the Afghan Air Force. But with the independence of India and Pakistan in 1947, British interest in the subcontinent dwindled, and with Pakistan remaining a Commonwealth member there was little incentive to arm its historical antagonist of Afghanistan, and the program drew to a close.
