= 203 Mansoori Corps =

- Pashto: ۲۰۳ منصوري قول اردو
- Founded: October 2021
- Country: Afghanistan
- Allegiance: Islamic Emirate of Afghanistan
- Branch: Afghan Army
- Type: Corps
- Nickname: Mansoori
- Engagements: Republican insurgency in Afghanistan: Balkhab uprising; 2026 Afghanistan–Pakistan war

Commanders
- Chief of Staff: Maulvi Hezbollah Afghan
- Commander: Qari Mohammad Ayub Khalid
- Deputy Commander: Rohul Amin

The 203 Mansoori Corps is one of the eight corps of the Islamic Emirate Army established in October 2021 and headquartered in Gardez. The current Chief of Staff is Maulvi Hezbollah Afghan. In December 2021, 450 soldiers after completing military training graduated from the 203 Mansoori Corps headquarters in Paktia province. The corps includes of the 2nd and 3rd Border Brigade each consists of hundreds of security personnel.

The Islamic Republic of Afghanistan-era corps it replaced was known as the 203 'Tandar' Corps and was a part of Afghan National Army.

== Command Staff ==
Chiefs of Staff
Chief of Staff	Period	Notes	Ref(s)
Ahmadullah Mubarak	4 October 2021 – 4 March 2022		
Maulvi Hezbollah Afghan	4 March 2022 – Present		
Commanders
Commander	Period	Notes	Ref(s)
Qari Mohammad Ayub Khalid	4 October 2021 – Present		
Deputy Commanders
Deputy Commander	Period	Notes	Ref(s)
Rohul Amin	4 October 2021 – Present		

== 203 Tandar Corps until 2021 ==
203rd Corps
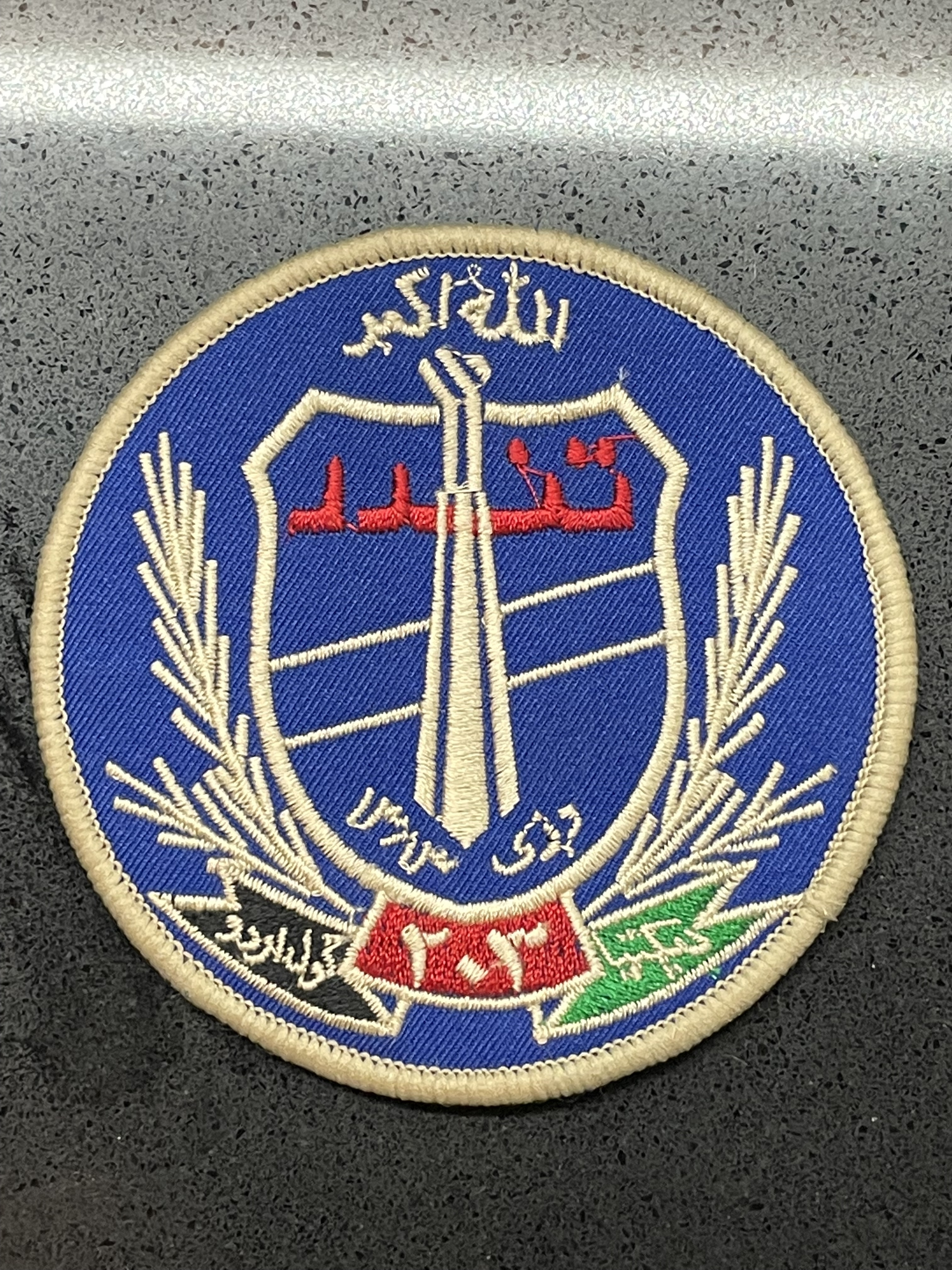
- 203rd Corps patch
- Active: 23 September 2004–14 August 2021
- Country: Afghanistan
- Branch: Afghan National Army
- Type: Corps
- Headquarters: Gardez, Paktia Province, Afghanistan
- Nickname: Tandar (Thunder)
- Engagements: War in Afghanistan (2001–2021)

Commanders
- Last commander: General Dadan Lawang

The 203rd 'Tandar' (Thunder) Corps was a corps of the Afghan National Army (ANA), headquartered in Gardez. The original Gardez Regional Command was established on 23 September 2004. It was heavily involved in the War in Afghanistan (2001–2021).

Early in 2006, the formation carried out the very first of the reborn Afghan Army's Medical civic action programs, providing medical assistance to the civilian population, in Khost Province. On 19 October 2006, as part of Operation Mountain Fury, two Embedded Training Teams (ETTs) supervised a D30 artillery section from Fourth Battalion, Second Brigade, 203rd Corps, as it fired its first combat artillery missions, harassing the enemy with indirect fires. Three days later, the battalion successfully conducted counterfire (with assistance from a US Q-36 radar).

Major General Abdul Khaliq, the corps commander, took operational command of Operation Maiwand in Andar district, Ghazni Province, a reported Taliban stronghold, in July 2007. This was reported as the first large-scale mission the ANA had planned and executed. Maiwand involved over 1,000 Afghan and 400 United States Army personnel.

As of 2009, the corps consisted of the First Brigade (Khost), Second Brigade (Forward Operating Base Rushmore, Sharana, Paktika Province), and Third Brigade (Ghazni). As of 30 November 2011, Brig. Gen. Zamaray Khan was listed by Jane's Defence Weekly as commander of the Second Brigade, 203rd Corps.

The corps was supported by the Gardez Regional Support Squadron of the Afghan Air Force, equipped with eight helicopters: four transport, to support the corps' commando battalion; two attack; and two medical transport. In 2017, the 203rd Corps and 303rd Police Zone demonstrated a high level of cooperation not seen across Afghanistan according to Colonel Matthew J. Van Wagenen, commander of Task Force Southeast.

The last commander of the Corps was General Dadan Lawang who had earlier been retired by Asadullah Khalid but brought back by Ashraf Ghani. The Corps surrendered in Gardez on 14 August 2021.

== See also ==
- List of Afghan Armed Forces installations
- List of NATO installations in Afghanistan
