= 207th Corps (Afghanistan) =

- Emblem of the 207th Corps
- Active: 23 September 2004 –August 2021
- Country: Islamic Emirate of Afghanistan
- Branch: Afghan National Army
- Type: Corps
- Headquarters: Camp Zafar, Herat Province, Afghanistan
- Nickname: Zafar (Victory)
- Engagements: War in Afghanistan (2001–2021)

Commanders
- Last Commander: Khyal Nabi Ahmadzai

Insignia
- Corps Flag

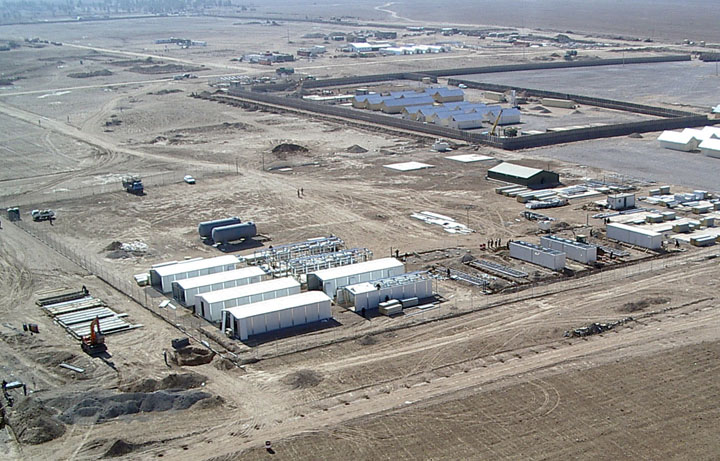
Construction of Camp Zafar under way in Herat Province, 2005.

The 207th 'Zafar' (Victory) Corps was a corps of the Afghan National Army. It was headquartered at Camp Zafar, Herat, in Herat Province in the west of Afghanistan.

It included the 1st Brigade at Herat, the 2nd Brigade at Farah, and elements at Shindand (including commandos). The corps was supported by the Herat Regional Support Squadron of the Afghan Air Force, equipped with eight helicopters: four transport to support the corps' commando kandak (battalion), two attack, and two medical transport aircraft. It was reported that the 3rd Brigade, 207th Corps would be established in Chesma-e-Dozakh, Badghis Province, where as of October 2011 barracks were under construction.

During the Taliban offensive in 2021, the Corps was charged with the defence of Herat province. On 13 August 2021, the Corps along with its commander, Khyal Nabi Ahmadzai, surrendered to the Taliban.

== History ==
Previous Afghan forces in the region included the 17th Division at Herat. In May 1957 in Herat, in the garrison of the 17th Infantry Division (commander – Lieutenant General Muhammad Khan, from 1963 to 1973 – Army General, and Minister of National Defence), the first course in Afghanistan began operating for the study of Soviet armored vehicles – T-34 tanks and BTR-40 and BTR-152 armoured personnel carriers. After a few months, the first graduates of the Herat tank courses formed the backbone of the command personnel and crews of the 4th Armoured Brigade (Afghanistan) at Pul-e-Charkhi.

On 15 March 1979, insurgents gathered around mosques. They marched on Herat, where they were joined by many townsmen in attacking government buildings, and symbols of communism. The 17th Division was detailed by the regime to put down the resulting uprising, but this proved a mistake, as there were few Khalqis in the division. Instead, it mutinied and joined the uprising. The mutiny was led by Senior Captain Ismael Khan, an officer in the divisional anti-aircraft battalion, and Captain Alladin, a signals officer. A small group of soldiers, officials and Khalq activists withdrew into the city's Blue Mosque. The insurgents held Herat for about a week, during which the city underwent a period of anarchy.

The 4th Corps was created in the 1980s during the Soviet–Afghan War and by 1988 included the 17th Division at Herat and the 21st Division around Farah. According to Mark Urban, as of 1 January 1985 the 17th Division included the 28th Brigade at Herat, the 33rd Brigade at Qala-Yi-Naw, Badghis Province, and the 2nd Regiment at Chakhcharan, Ghowr Province. Two other brigades had been disbanded after the Herat revolt in 1979.

On 13 August 2003, President Karzai removed Governor Ismail Khan from his command of the 4th Corps. In the Fall of 2003 Karzai appointed a new head of the 4th Corps, but initially he was not able to take his post in Herat because it came at the expense of Ismail Khan. In March 2004, fighting between two local militias took place in the western Afghan city of Herat. It was reported that Mirwais Sadiq (son of warlord Ismail Khan) was assassinated in unclear circumstances. A larger conflict ensued between troops of Ismail Khan and Abdul Zahir Nayebzada, a senior local military commander blamed for the death of Sadiq, that resulted in the death of up to 100 people. Nayebzada commanded the 17th Herat Division of the Defence Ministry's 4th Corps. In response to the fighting, about 1,500 newly trained ANA soldiers from the Central Corps were sent from Kabul to Herat in order to bring the situation under control.

An article dated 10 April 2005 by The Coalition Press Information Center (Public Affairs) reports that "the remaining members of the Afghan.. 4th Corps handed over official authority for the protection of Herat, Badghis, Farah and Ghor provinces to the 207th Regional Corps of the Afghan National Army".

== 207th Corps commanders ==
Source: Afghan-bios.info

- Lt. Gen. Walizadah (200502),
- Maj. Gen. Jalandar Shah Behnam (2007, 20080526),
- Maj. Gen. Fazal Ahmad Sayar (2009) killed in a helicopter crash in Adraskan District (Herat).
- Maj. Gen. Jalandar Shah Behnam (20090000 - 20100900 )
- Maj. Gen. Dauranshah Shahzada (201010 - 20110000 )
- Maj. Gen. Taj Mohammad Jahid (20121004 - )
- Maj. Gen. Zaman Waziree
- Maj. Gen. Abdul Raof Arghandiwal
- Maj. Gen. Khyal Nabi Ahmadzai

== See also ==
- List of Afghan Armed Forces installations
- List of NATO installations in Afghanistan
