= 217 Omari Corps =

- Pashto: ۲۱۷ عمري قول اردو
- Founded: October 2021
- Country: Afghanistan
- Allegiance: Islamic Emirate of Afghanistan
- Branch: Afghan Army
- Type: Corps
- Nickname: Omari

Commanders
- Chief of Staff: Mohammad Shafiq
- Commander: Rahmatullah Mohammad
- Deputy Commander: Mohammad Ismail Turkman

The 217 Omari Corps is one of the eight corps of the Islamic Emirate Army established in October 2021 and headquartered in Kunduz. The current Chief of Staff is Mohammad Shafiq. The corps includes Kunduz brigade, Baghlan brigade, Takhar brigade and Badakhshan brigade.

The Islamic Republic of Afghanistan-era corps it replaced was known as the 217th 'Pamir' Corps and was a part of Afghan National Army.

== Command Staff ==
Chiefs of Staff
Chief of Staff	Period	Notes	Ref(s)
Mohammad Shafiq	4 October 2021 – Present		
Commanders
Commander	Period	Notes	Ref(s)
Rahmatullah Mohammad	4 October 2021 – Present		
Deputy Commanders
Deputy Commander	Period	Notes	Ref(s)
Qari Mohammad Ismail Turkman	4 October 2021 – 14 March 2022		
Jan Mohammad Akhund	14 March 2022 – Present		

== Brigades ==
Brigade	Commander
Kunduz brigade	Ahmad Yasir
Baghlan brigade	Qari Shakir
Takhar brigade	Qari Aminullah Tayeb
Badakhshan brigade	Qari Abdul Rahman

== 217th 'Pamir' Corps ==
217th Corps
- Active: April 2019–August 2021
- Country: Afghanistan
- Branch: Afghan National Army
- Type: Corps
- Headquarters: Kunduz, Kunduz province
- Engagements: War in Afghanistan (2001–2021)

Commanders
- Last commander: General Muhammad Ali Yazdi

The 217th 'Pamir' Corps was one of the Corps of the Afghan National Army. Its headquarters was in Kunduz, Kunduz province. The Corps was established in 2019 in northeast of Afghanistan and Gen. Nabi Mirzayi was appointed as its first commander.

The Corps was established to improve the security situation in northeastern region of Afghanistan. However, the military experts expressed skepticism regarding the ability of the Corps to help improve the security in the northeastern parts of the country. In 2019, the Corps had two brigades according to officials from Afghanistan’s Ministry of Defense.

The last commander of the Corps was Muhammad Ali Yazdi who had assumed the command of the Corps in 2020. During the Taliban offensive in 2021, the Corps resisted Taliban attacks on Kunduz for more than a month and later surrendered in Kunduz on 11 August 2021.
