= 201 Khalid Ibn Walid Corps =

201 Khalid Ibn al-Walid Corps
- Pashto: ۲۰۱ خالد بن ولید قول اردو
- Active: October 2021–Present
- Country: Afghanistan
- Allegiance: Islamic Emirate of Afghanistan
- Branch: Afghan Army
- Type: Corps
- Nickname: 'Khalid Ibn al-Walid'
- Patron: Khalid ibn al-Walid
- Engagements: War in Afghanistan (2001–2021); 2026 Afghanistan–Pakistan war

Commanders
- Chief of Staff: Abdul Rahman Mansoori
- Commander: Abu Dujana Abdul-Sabur
- Deputy Commander: Ibrahim

The 201 Khalid Ibn al-Walid Corps is one of the eight corps of the Islamic Emirate Army established in October 2021 and headquartered in Laghman. The current Chief of Staff is Abdul Rahman Mansoori.

The conventional corps of the Islamic Emirate Army were renamed in November 2021 by Mohammad Yaqub Mujahid, Acting Minister of Defense. The 201 Corps was renamed 'Khalid Ibn Walid' and at the time was under the command of Abu Dujana Abdul-Sabur (Commander); Abdul Rahman Mansoori (Chief of Staff); and Ibrahim (Deputy Commander).

The Islamic Republic of Afghanistan-era corps it replaced was known as the 201st 'Selab' Corps and was a part of Afghan National Army.

== Command Staff ==
Chiefs of Staff
Chief of Staff	Period	Notes	Ref(s)
Abdul Rahman Mansoori	4 October 2021 – Present		
Commanders
Commander	Period	Notes	Ref(s)
Abu Dujana Abdul-Sabur	4 October 2021 – Present		
Deputy Commanders
Deputy Commander	Period	Notes	Ref(s)
Ibrahim	4 October 2021 – Present		

== 201st 'Selab' Corps 2004-2021 ==
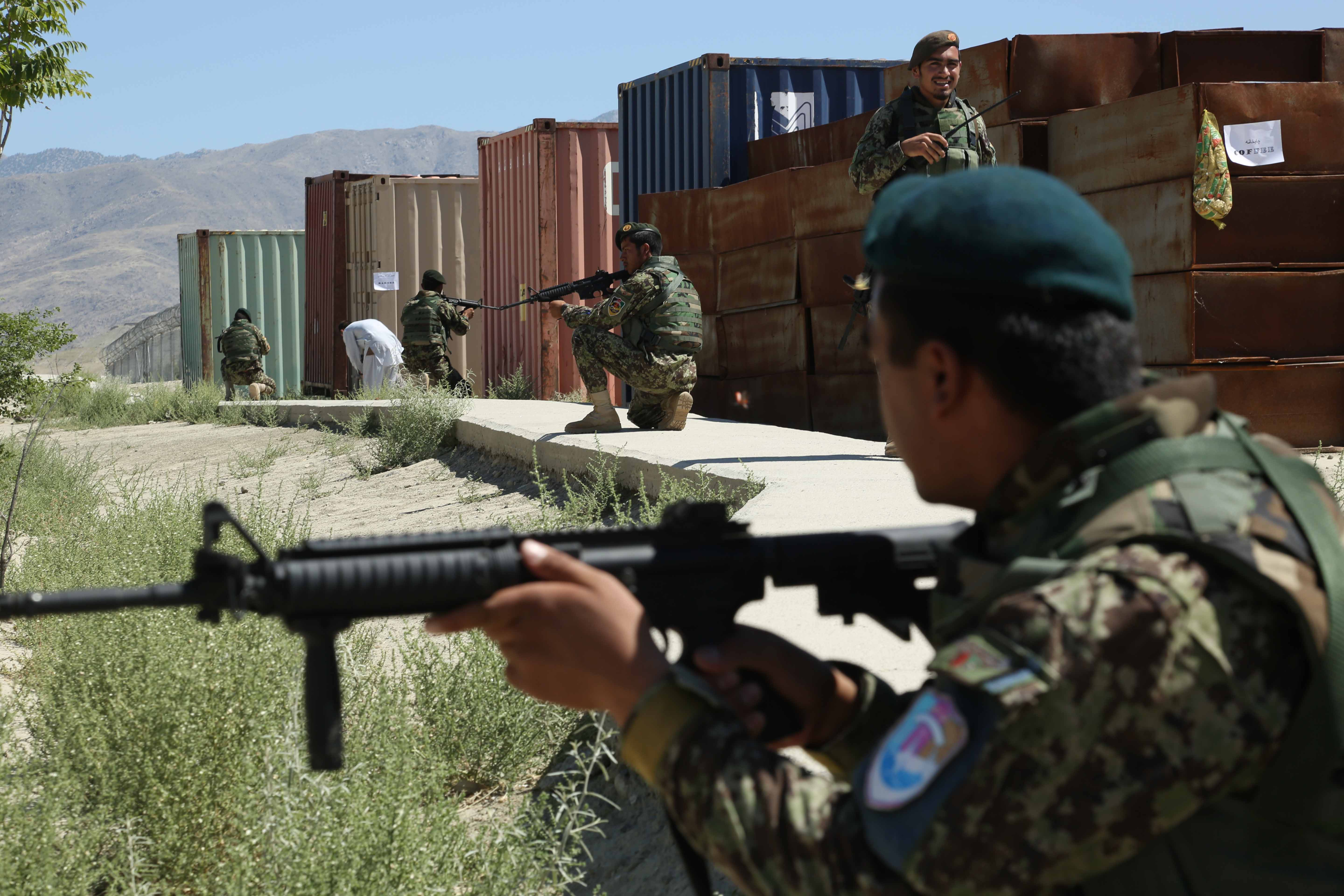
Soldiers assigned to the 201st Corps during a training exercise in 2013

201st 'Selab' Corps
- Active: 1 September 2004–15 August 2021
- Country: Afghanistan
- Branch: Afghan National Army
- Type: Corps
- Headquarters: Kabul
- Nickname: 'Selab' (Flood)
- Engagements: War in Afghanistan (2001–2021)

Commanders
- Last commander: Brigadier Abdul Jabbar

The 201st 'Selab' Corps was a corps-sized formation of the now-defunct Islamic Republic's Afghan National Army. The corps additionally had the same designation as the 201st Commando Battalion in the Afghan Commando Forces under the Democratic Republic of Afghanistan.

The establishment of the corps started when the first commander and some of his staff were appointed on 1 September 2004. The first two ANA brigades for what was at the time called the Central Corps were activated on 22 March 2003. Under the Islamic Republic of Afghanistan the corps had the name 'Selab' (Flood). The corps was responsible for the east of the country (Kabul, Logar, Kapisa, Nuristan, Kunar, and Laghman provinces). Brigadier Abdul Jabbar was the last commander of the Corps. He was appointed as the commander of Corps on 8 January 2021.

The corps' 1st Brigade was stationed at the Presidential Palace. Its 3rd Brigade at Pol-e-Charkhi was a mechanised formation including M113s and Soviet-built main battle tanks. In mid-2003, the 11th Armored Cavalry Regiment sent a training team to the 3rd Battalion, 3rd Brigade, of the Central Corps to assist the creation of a battalion equipped with T-62s and BMP-1s and BMP-2s to help provide security during the Loya Jirga of 2003 and the 2004 Afghan presidential elections.

Later information from LongWarJournal.com placed most of the 3rd Brigade at Jalalabad, 2nd Brigade at Pol-e-Charkhi, and only a single battalion of 1st Brigade at the Presidential Palace. Its area of responsibility included Kabul as well as vital routes running north and south, and valleys leading from the Pakistani border into Afghanistan. As of 2009, the 3rd Brigade of the 201st Corps was the only unit that had control of an area of responsibility in Afghanistan without the aid or assistance of U.S. or coalition forces. August 6–7, 2009 in the Shpee Valley, Kapisa, during a joint Afghan-Franco-American Operation (Brest Thunder), Afghan soldiers from 3rd Kandak, 3rd Brigade, 201st Corps saved the life of Forward Observer Christopher Mercer Lowe (US Army) after he took a snipers bullet to his right thigh.

A new fourth brigade of the corps was planned to be established in the province of Nuristan. By 2013, the 4th Brigade, 201st Corps, had its headquarters near Jalalabad.

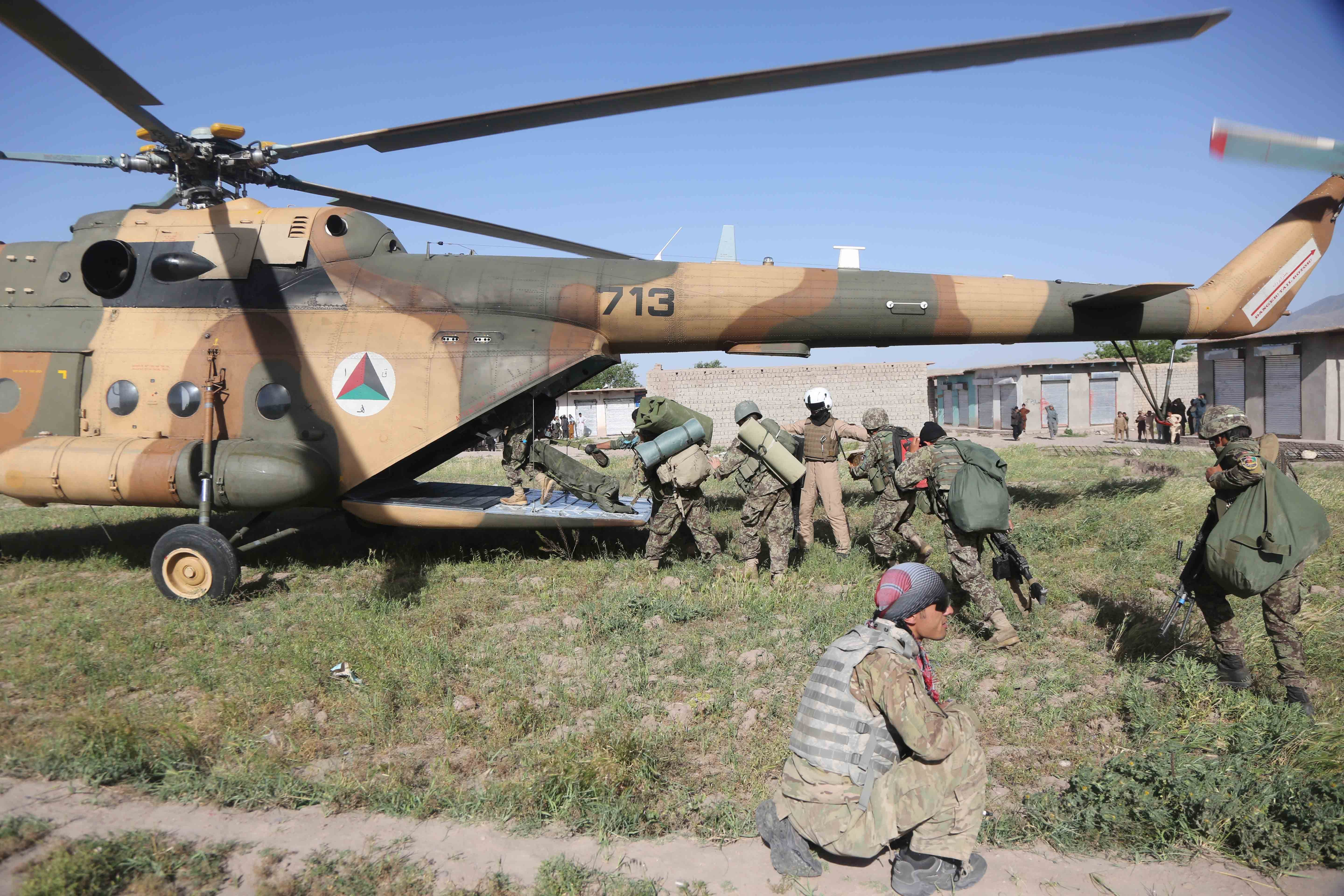
Soldiers of the 1st Kandak, 4th Brigade, 201st Corps board an Afghan Air Force Mi-17 helicopter after executing a clearing operation near Hesarak, Nangarhar province, 17 May 2013

In February 2008, Marine Colonel Jeffrey Haynes and Embedded Training Team (ETT) 3–5, a part of the Regional Corps Advisory Command-Central (RCAC-C), arrived with a mission to "mentor the 201st Corps.. by providing military advice and training guidance" to its officers and staff noncommissioned officers. "The 201st Corps is very good," Colonel Haynes said. "When the Taliban attacked the prison in Kandahar last summer, they spearheaded the ANA effort into Anghardab and recaptured that strategic valley. The ANA handled their own logistics and their own intelligence." In the recent Marine-ANA-French (Groupement tactique interarmes de Kapisa) Operation Nan-e-Shab Berun, coalition and ANA forces cleared the Alah Say Valley of insurgents; casualties included one French and four ANA soldiers killed, with 37 opponents killed in action.

Following the crash of Kam Air Flight 904 in 2005, ISAF made numerous unsuccessful helicopter rescue operation attempts. ANA soldiers also searched for the plane. The Ministry of Defense ordered the ANA's Central Corps to assemble a team to attempt a rescue of victims presumed to be alive. The crash site was at an altitude of 11,000 feet (3,400 m) on the peak of the Chaperi Mountain, 20 miles (32 km) east of Kabul.

The 2nd Security Force Assistance Brigade provided maintenance assistance to the 201st Regional Military Training Center of the 201st Corps in late 2019-early 2020 to help maintain their 1960-vintage Soviet D-30 122mm howitzers.

The 201st Corps and 111th Capital Division were the last IRA forces operational in Afghanistan remaining before the Taliban's offensive reached Kabul. On 15 August 2021, the 201st Corps surrendered in east of Kabul.

== Previous Afghan Army forces in the Kabul area ==
Previous Afghan formations in the Kabul area included the 1st Central Army Corps, from the 1960s to 1992. The Central Army Corps was a very influential formation, being stationed in the capital of Afghanistan under every regime.

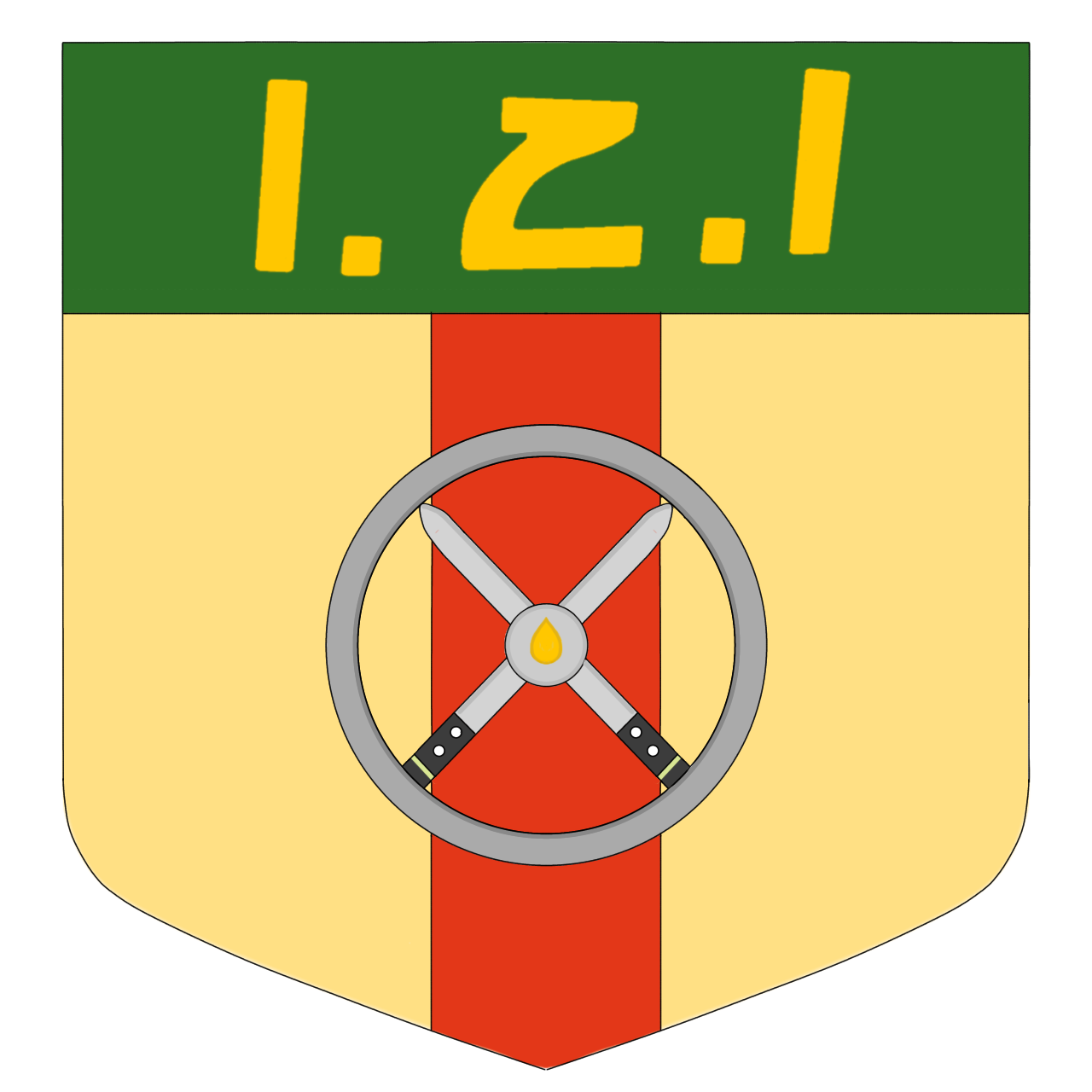
The badge of the Royal Afghan Army’s 1st Central Corps

In 1953, Lieutenant General Mohammed Daoud Khan, first cousin of the King who had previously served as Minister of Defence, was transferred from command of the Central Corps in Kabul to become Prime Minister of Afghanistan. His command has also been referred to as the Central Command and Central Forces. The Central Corps was headquartered at Amanullah's Darulaman Palace. On the opening day of Parliament in October 1965, a violent student demonstration among which Babrak Karmal was at the forefront forced Zahir Shah's new prime minister Yousef to resign. Two students were killed when the new corps commander, General Abdul Wali, sent in troops to restore order.

In 1978 the corps consisted of the 7th and 8th Divisions, the Republican Guard Brigade, two commando regiments, the 4th and 15th Armoured Brigades, and several support units. The 4th Armoured Brigade played a key role in spearheading the Saur Revolution of April 1978. An accessible Kabul Times article of the period describes what it claims as the 15th Armoured Division's celebrations of the Saur Revolution, and gives the division commander's name as Major Mohammed Amin. The Corps began to be worn away by desertions, with one of the first, involving a brigade of the 7th Division, occurring in mid-May 1979 on the road from Gardez to Khost. The whole brigade, maybe 2000 strong, reportedly joined the mujahadeen. Reportedly they surrendered on the condition that they be allowed to keep their uniforms and weapons and join the anti-government struggle.

"As late as September 1982," the commander of the Central Corps, a General variously reported as Wodud (Joes) or Abdul Wadood (Yousaf and Adkin), was shot in his office. The 8th Division is extensively referenced in Ali A. Jalali and Lester Grau's Afghan Guerrilla Warfare: In the Words of the Mujahideen Fighters, c. 2001.

In response to a Taliban attack towards Herat from the south in March–April 1995, the Kabul government airlifted a reported 2,000 troops from the Central Corps to Herat. This was the first airlift of its kind since 1992. BBC's Summary of World Broadcasts for 1999 reports a radio transcript from Kabul noting that the former commander of the Central Corps, Mola Abdurraof Akhond, was appointed a commander elsewhere.

The Central Corps appears to have been reactivated in August 2003. The creation of the corps was planned to place army brigades under a central command structure [again], creating a command and control headquarters for the new ANA. Maj Gen Mohammed Moiun Faqir, an ethnic Pashtun, was appointed as corps commander. It was one of the first recipients of new Afghan National Army battalions trained by the United States, with its strength in July including five to six of the new battalions within two brigades. Soon afterwards, a training team from the 11th Armored Cavalry Regiment at Fort Irwin was sent to Kabul to assist the 3rd Battalion, 3rd Brigade, of the Central Corps to form an effective tank unit, using T-62s.

In March 2004, fighting between two local militias took place in Herat. It was reported that Mirwais Sadiq (son of warlord Ismail Khan) was assassinated in unclear circumstances. Thereafter a bigger conflict began that resulted in the death of up to 100 people. The battle was between troops of Ismail Khan and Abdul Zahir Nayebzada, a senior local military commander blamed for the death of Sadiq. Nayebzada commanded the 17th Herat Division of the Defence Ministry's 4th Corps. In response to the fighting, about 1,500 newly trained Central Corps soldiers were sent to Herat in order to bring the situation under control.

The 8th Division was still active in July 2004, when defence minister Mohammed Fahim was considering pushing back against Karzai's removal of him from the position of Karzai's running mate for first vice-president. Fahim and his faction Shura-e Nazar commanded the loyalty of the formation, which was described as having ''..an estimated 5,000 loyal troops stationed in the Shomali Plain—the fertile land just north of Kabul—and in the capital itself.''
