= History of the Afghan Armed Forces (2002–2021) =

History of the Afghan Armed Forces 2002–2021

The Afghan Armed Forces were called the Afghan National Army (ANA) while under the direction of the Islamic Republic of Afghanistan from 2004 (and previously the Transitional Islamic State of Afghanistan from 2002), until the fall of Kabul to the Taliban in 2021. As they grew, US DOD reporting changed, to start referring to the force as the Afghan National Armed Forces. As of 2020, components of the ANA included the conventional ground forces, the Special Operations Command, the Territorial Force, the Afghan Air Force, the Afghan National Civil Order Force, and the Afghan Border Force. The ANA and several other agencies formed the Afghan National Security Forces.

The United States invasion of Afghanistan in 2001 was assisted by various anti-Taliban Afghan militias. These factional militias formed the Afghan Military Forces (AMF) during the political transition under the early Karzai administration, while the United States began training the first army battalions. Hamid Karzai signed the decree on the founding of the Afghan National Army on 1 December 2002. The first ANA battalions began training in May 2002, the regional corps structure began to be established in 2003, and the first national military strategy was adopted in 2004. Early deployments of the ANA included operations along the border with Pakistan, intervening to stop infighting among militias, and providing security for the 2004 presidential election. The role of the army in combat operations increased in 2005, with the ANA conducting several missions alongside coalition forces. The AMF militias fragmented, losing strength, and some of their members became part of the ANA.

Although the ANA and the police did much of the fighting during the 2006 Taliban offensive, it revealed that the army was too small to handle the rising Taliban insurgency. The creation of the ANA Air Corps, Commandos, and Civil Order Force took place shortly after the 2006 offensive. The ANA continued to slowly grow during 2007 and 2008 while conducting operations against the Taliban with coalition troops, but the group still expanded its control over the Helmand and Kandahar provinces in the south. Fighters also entered eastern Afghanistan from Pakistan, getting closer to Kabul. In 2009, President Barack Obama began a troop surge in Afghanistan, which included additional advisors to increase the ANA's capabilities and prepare for the "transition" of the war from international forces to the Afghan government. That year the ANA surpassed its original target strength of 70,000 soldiers.

Between 2009 and 2012, the ANA worked with the International Security Assistance Force (ISAF) and Afghan police forces to increase stability in Helmand and Kandahar. In 2013 the Afghan government was at its greatest territorial control since the start of the insurgency. The scale of Taliban attacks on Afghan forces began to increase that year, and continued to do so after ISAF ended its mission and made the ANA fully responsible for military operations at the end of 2014. In 2015, the Taliban made its largest territorial gains since 2006, and briefly captured a provincial capital for the first time since 2001, before it was retaken by ANA and US Army special forces. The ANA experienced growing casualties and demoralization in the years after 2014, and became reliant on Commandos because the regular forces frequently abandoned their posts without much resistance. Although the ANA reached a size of nearly 170,000 troops as of 2016, by the end of that year the Taliban was in its strongest position since before the 2009 foreign troop surge.

In 2018 the Taliban nearly captured two major cities from the regular military, Farah and Ghazni, which had to be retaken by Afghan and US special forces. By that year, the Border Police and Civil Order Police were transferred to the ANA, and a Territorial Force was also established. As of mid-2019, ANA bases and checkpoints were being overrun by the Taliban on a frequent basis. After the United States–Taliban deal in 2020, the ANA went on an "active defense posture," while the Taliban increased its activity, besieging many provincial capitals. The ANA's logistics were severely undermined by the Taliban cutting off roads shortly before the 2021 Taliban offensive. The Taliban started the offensive by targeting districts. Although the ANA initially retook some districts from the Taliban, the vast majority remained under the group's control. Several provincial capitals fell in early August 2021. Regional corps were overrun, and as of 15 August 2021, all corps and the capital division in Kabul had surrendered or been captured. Some ANA soldiers continued to fight for up to a month after the collapse, and some joined the Republican insurgency in Afghanistan. The Taliban has regularly used former soldiers and officers in the reconstituted Afghan Armed Forces after the disintegration of the ANA.

== History ==
=== Origin and formation ===
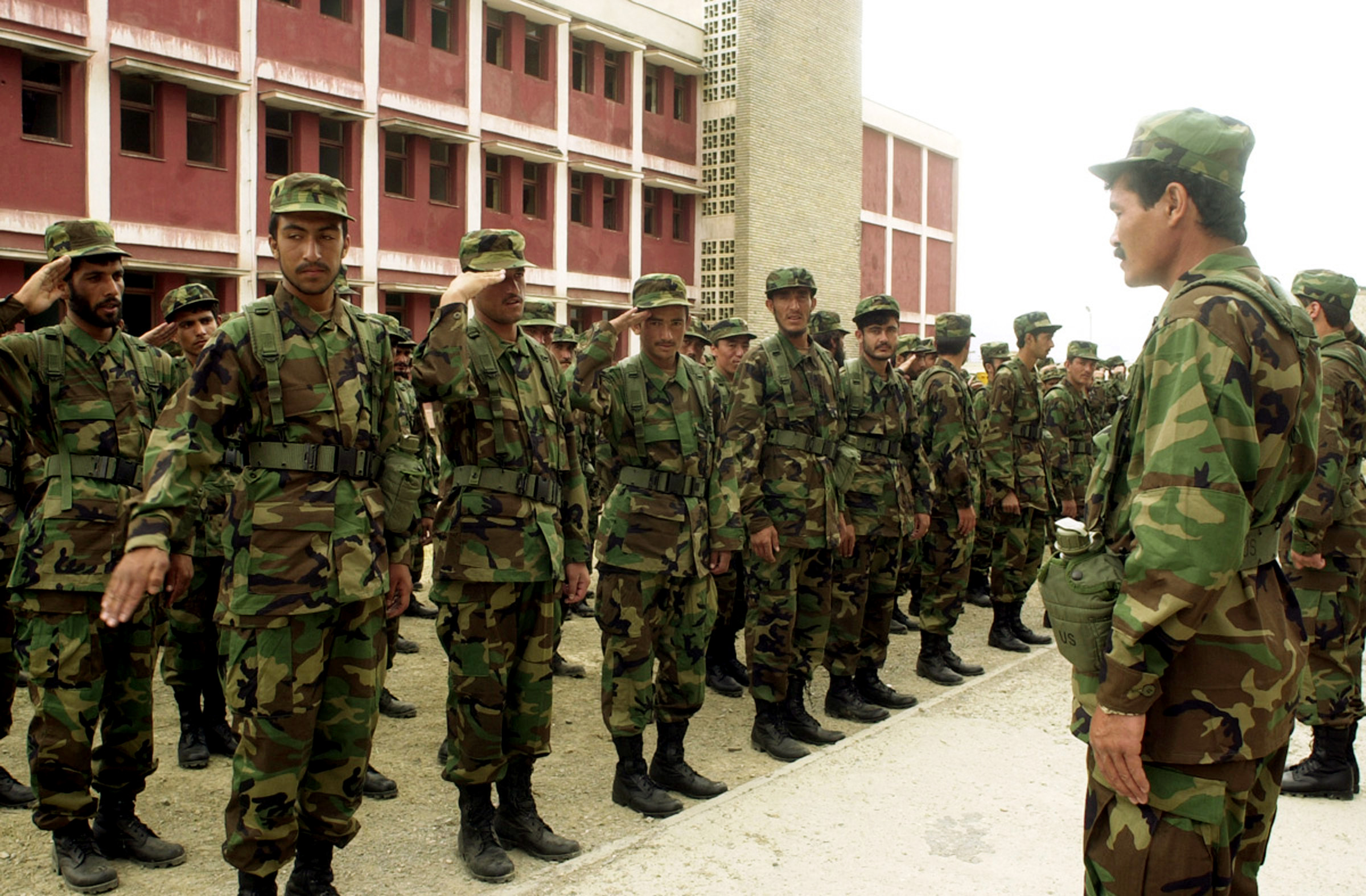
Some of the first ANA recruits in their new uniforms, on 14 May 2002, before the start of their training with US Green Berets.

Following the United States invasion of Afghanistan in 2001, a US-backed Afghan government was established within the framework of the December 2001 Bonn agreement. It began a political transition period under the Afghan Interim Administration, which was replaced in June 2002 when the Emergency Loya Jirga elected the Afghan Transitional Administration, in the lead-up to the 2004 Afghan presidential election. Hamid Karzai, who led the interim authorities from 2001, became the president of the Islamic Republic of Afghanistan. After the Taliban government fell in 2001, Afghan militia forces numbering around 100,000 men filled the security vacuum. Among the largest and best equipped militias were those of former Northern Alliance intelligence chief Mohammed Fahim, and the warlords Ismael Khan and Abdul Rashid Dostum. The Bonn agreement founded the Afghan Military Forces (AMF) under the Ministry of Defense, organized into eight corps and 40 "divisions" (which were not comparable to a typical military division). Unit titles and individual ranks in the AMF were only vague indicators of status. These militia forces were still loyal to individual commanders rather than to the Afghan state, and the Transitional Administration faced the task of building a national military while demobilizing the factional militias.

Though it was decided at a meeting of international donors in April 2002 that the United States would lead the creation of an Afghan army, US Defense Secretary Donald Rumsfeld was reluctant to spend resources on the task, choosing to let the Northern Alliance and the warlords be responsible for security, as did Gen. Tommy Franks of United States Central Command. The main concern of the United States at the time was going after the Taliban remnants and Al-Qaeda. It was not until October 2002 that US Lt. Gen. Karl Eikenberry became the head of the newly formed Office of Military Cooperation–Afghanistan (OMCA), which was tasked with building the Afghan National Army (ANA) as an ethnically balanced and professional force. Eikenberry would become known among Afghan leaders as "the father of the Afghan National Army." In May 2002 the coalition had started a program to train a number of 600-man ANA battalions, mainly by the United States Army Special Forces (Green Berets), along with a presidential guard that was to be trained by the International Security Assistance Force (ISAF). Afghan recruits were assembled into battalions (kandaks), assigned unit leaders, and put through ten weeks of training. The coalition faced many challenges, including overcoming tribal and ethnic loyalties, as well as finding NCOs and junior officers, which was done from among veterans of the militias and the Communist-era Afghan army. Desertion rates were initially very high (50%), but dropped to 30% in 2003. The battalions were disproportionately Tajik, despite an attempt to create a balanced ethnic mix.

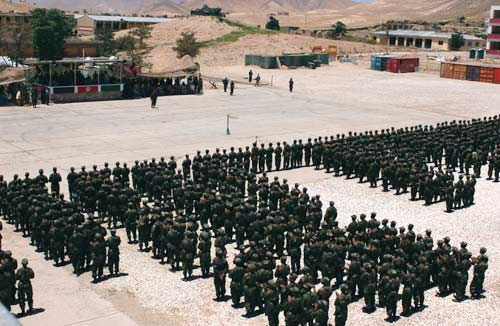
Soldiers of the 1st Battalion, ANA, perform drill and ceremony at the graduation event at the Kabul Military Training Center in Kabul, Afghanistan, July 2002.

The military command was initially dominated by the Shura-e Nazar, the political-military cell of the Northern Alliance, which had been dissolved and reformed under the Afghan Interim Administration. Mohammed Fahim became the minister of defense, promoting himself from general to marshal in April 2002, and the alliance's leading front-line commander, Bismillah Khan Mohammadi, became the Chief of the General Staff. In early June 2002, a Defense Commission was established in the Transitional Administration to coordinate the effort to build a military, and was subordinated to Fahim instead of President Karzai. On 1 December 2002, Karzai signed the decree on the creation of the Afghan National Army for the Transitional Islamic State of Afghanistan. The decree specified that it would be a balanced mix of Afghanistan's ethnic groups, and was announced the next day at the Bonn Conference of foreign donors. Throughout 2002 and early 2003, the AMF units were deployed under the defense ministry and along side the US military, while the US led the training of the ANA. The number of militia forces was reduced to 45,000 by the end of 2003. ANA units went on one-month tours of duty with embedded US advisors starting in early 2003, and as of May, nine ANA battalions were either complete or in training.

Eikenberry and Afghan finance minister Ashraf Ghani decided on an army target strength of 70,000. The ANA began to be formed in and around Kabul, with the Central Corps being formally activated on 30 August 2003 at Pol-e-charkhi. Four regional commands were also established by presidential decree in September 2003, which were based at Mazar-e-Sharif, Herat, Kandahar, and Gardez. In late 2003, regional recruitment centers were established, and the coalition reached an agreement with the Afghan Ministry of Defense to use common population figures for recruitment, which increased enlistment of Pashtuns, Hazara, and Uzbeks. Eikenberry initially focused on developing the General Staff, the Ministry of Defense, and the Central Corps in the Kabul area, which had a strength of 7,000 men in February 2004. The Central Corps completed its formation in June 2004, reaching a strength of three brigades (10,000 men), and new battalions that graduated after that were sent from Kabul to other regions. During that year, elements of the ANA Central Corps were deployed outside of Kabul on several occasions, including to provide security during the ratification of the new constitution of the Islamic Republic, and the ceremony for the opening of the Bagram-Kandahar section of the Ring Road.

On 21 October 2004, Afghanistan adopted its first National Military Strategy, developed by the Afghan MOD and the OMCA. It stated that the ANA, composed of ground and air forces, would support the political transition, replace all militia forces, and fight and disarm all illegal groups, independently or in cooperation with the coalition. In February 2005, the ANA had 21,200 soldiers (including 3,400 in training). The process of disbanding militia forces, the Afghan New Beginnings Programme (ANBP), was launched on 6 April 2003, overseen by the United Nations and Japan, and implemented by Afghanistan's defense ministry. Some warlords accepted the Karzai administration, while others resisted and continued to engage in criminal activity. As of September 2004, only 13,200 militia members out of the 100,000 had taken the option of either learning a civilian job skill or joining the ANA, leaving the rest unemployed. Some of the latter formed bands to set up roadblocks and take illegal tolls. A British officer, Maj. Gen. Peter Gilchrist, oversaw the Disarmament, Demobilization, and Reintegration (DDR) program, and by May 2005 most heavy weapons had been collected from the militias. Those that were still serviceable were given to the ANA.

=== Early missions and expansion ===
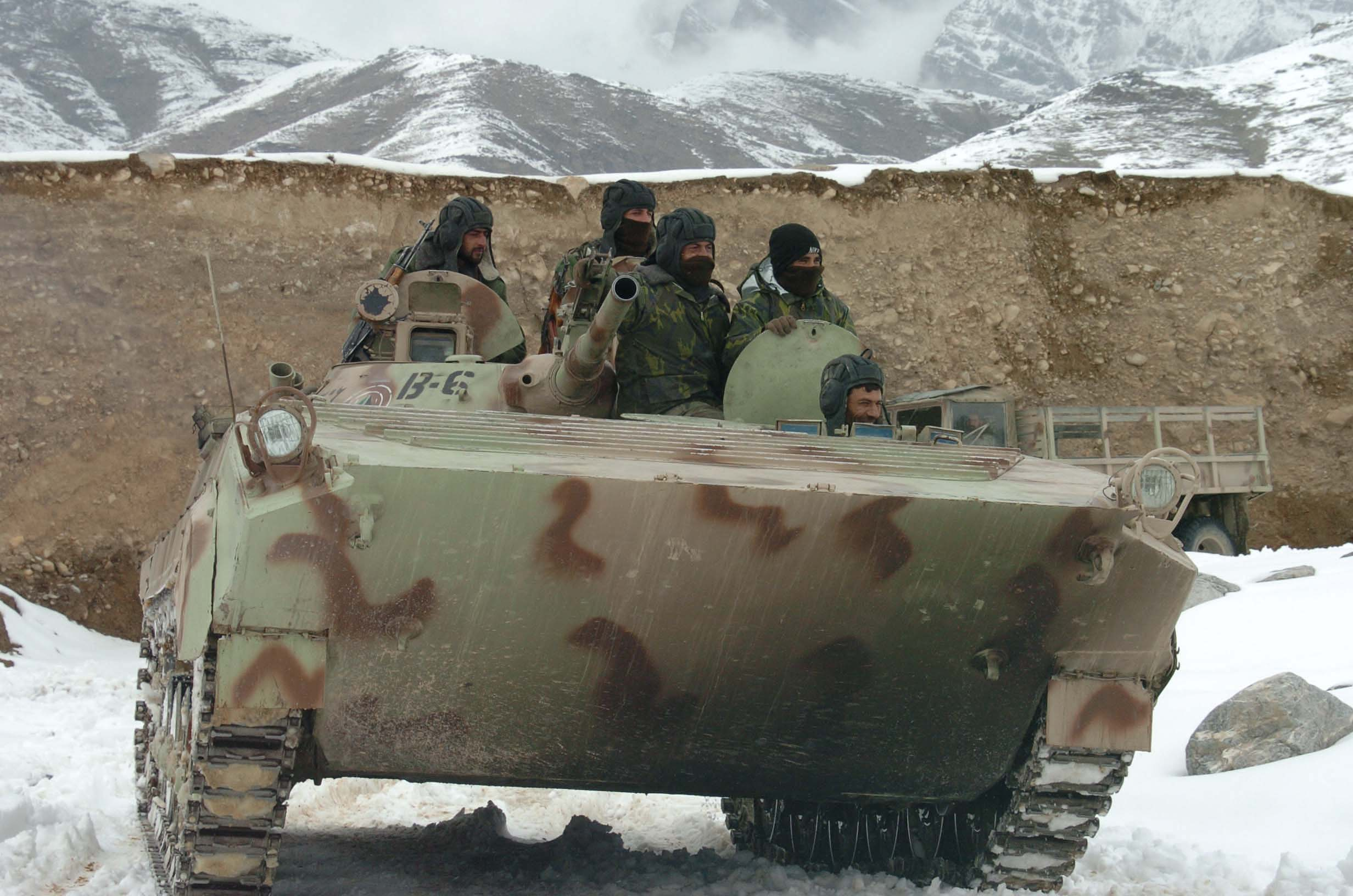
ANA BMP-1 crew members before departing for the recovery operation of Kam Air Flight 904, February 2005.

From July to September 2003, four ANA battalions took part in Operation Warrior Sweep with US and European coalition forces, intended to stop Al-Qaeda fighters from Pakistan from entering the provinces of Helmand, Kandahar, Uruzgan, and Zabul. They worked to cordon off and search suspected enemy bases. In March 2004, 1,500 ANA troops were sent to secure Herat after fighting there between different factions, and in April another 500 were deployed to Faryab Province after it was attacked by Dostum's Uzbek militia forces. In early 2004, the ANA worked alongside the 22nd Marine Expeditionary Unit in Operation Mountain Storm, intended to secure conditions for the presidential election in the fall, set up ambushes for Taliban and Al-Qaeda, which were meant to be driven into them by Pakistan Army offensives. In August 2004, elements of the 1st Battalion, 3rd Brigade, Central Corps, were deployed to Shindand after fighting between Ismail Khan and Amanullah Khan's forces. The first of the ANA's regional commands was activated in Kandahar on 19 September 2004, and was designated the 205th Corps.

The ANA successfully provided security for the presidential election in 2004: searching for IEDs, securing roads and counting stations, and maintaining a visible presence. This was done jointly with the Afghan National Police (ANP) and coalition forces. By 2005, the development of the ANA was proceeding slowly, and it experienced logistical problems, which the coalition forces attempted to rectify. But that year the ANA began taking a larger role in combat operations. The Taliban launched attacks in the winter of 2004–2005, and in February 2005, an Afghan army patrol in Helmand Province was ambushed. In April, ANA battalions conducted Operation Nam Dong in Uruzgan and Operation Minesweeper in Herat and Shindand with coalition forces. They established a command post, searched homes, confiscated weapons, and captured a militia leader. The presence of the ANA increased the willingness of the Afghan population to contribute to the coalition's efforts, by reporting discoveries of weapons caches or roadside bombs. Despite this, Afghans were still reluctant to show support for the ANA or the coalition, and insurgent activity increased during 2005. The ANA had 26,000 soldiers at the end of that year, and around that time the ANA was considered to be relatively competent, with US officials stating that more than two dozen ANA battalions were capable of operations with minimal coalition support. The National Military Academy of Afghanistan was opened in March 2005 after over two years of preparation, and was modeled on the United States Military Academy.

In early 2006, elements of the ANA's 201st and 203rd Corps assisted US-led missions in the north, expanding state control along the border with Pakistan. In late 2005, the Taliban began amassing fighters in southern Afghanistan's Kandahar Province, with support from Pakistan's Inter-Services Intelligence (ISI), and extending its influence in the Kandahar countryside. Throughout 2004 and 2005, militias in the area were being demobilized, and there were too few police and ANA units to replace them. These factors, along with tribal infighting and some locals feeling alienated by the Karzai administration and the US, created the conditions for the 2006 Taliban offensive. The ANA had one infantry bridge spread across Kandahar and Helmand, and its soldiers were a mix of former mujahideen and Communist-era army veterans. On 3 February 2006, the Taliban started the offensive with attacks on district centers in northern Helmand. The government sent an ANA battalion as reinforcements, and more later on as losses increased. The police largely deserted, and many police and soldiers were killed. By the summer of 2006, the Taliban reduced the government's control to the central area of Helmand, despite assistance by coalition forces. A similar situation occurred in Kandahar, the possibility emerged of the Taliban threatening Kandahar City.

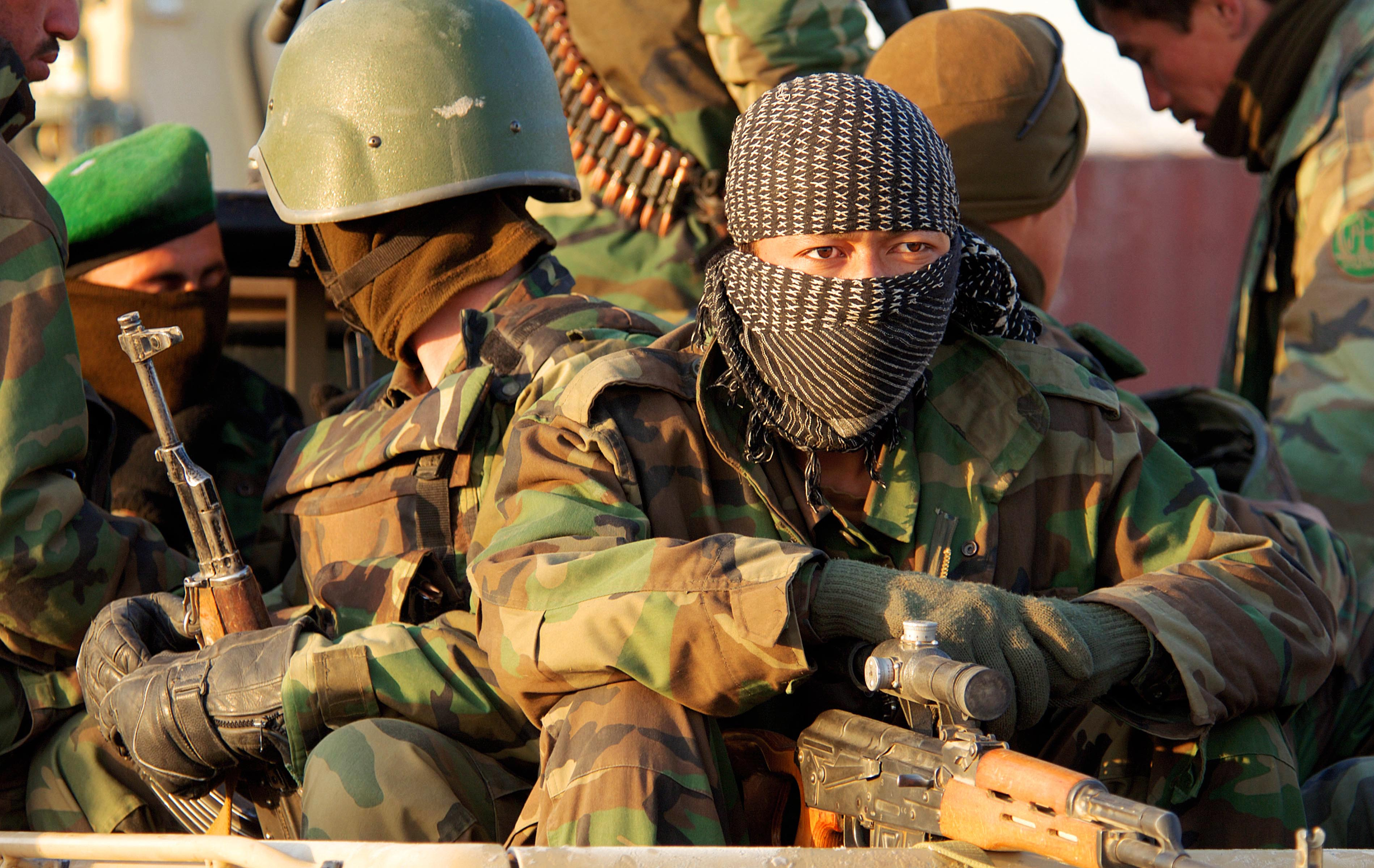
ANA soldiers prior to going on patrol with British troops in western Kandahar Province, 20 January 2007.

The coalition responded by launching Operation Mountain Thrust, an attempt to disrupt the Taliban's chain of command by sending troops into the mountains of Helmand, Kandahar, Uruzgan, and Zabul. In addition to US, Canadian, and British troops, the operation involved the ANA, specifically the 205th Corps under Maj. Gen. Rahmatullah Raufi. It lasted through June and July 2006, and the forces rarely encountered any Taliban. The operation had no lasting effect on the Taliban offensive. Karzai and the ANA Chief of the General Staff, Bismillah Khan, had done little to lead government efforts against it. Karzai was not interested in the development of the Afghan National Security Forces, and Khan was focused on his former power base in Kabul and the north. After a large Taliban attack on Afghan police in Panjwayi District on 19 August, ISAF commander Gen. David Richards decided to go on the offensive in early September to protect Kandahar City. Operation Medusa—which in addition to the ISAF involved a company from the 205th Corps and the 1st Battalion, 3rd Brigade, 201st Corps—reportedly resulted in the deaths of 1,000 Taliban fighters, and protected Kandahar City. Gen. Bismillah Khan arrived from Kabul to oversee the operation. Although it was a tactical victory, a security vacuum remained in the south, where the Taliban took control of much of Helmand, Kandahar, Zabul, Uruzgan, Farah, and Ghazni by 2007.

The US placed more importance on developing Afghan forces in 2006, leading to the creation of Combined Security Transition Command–Afghanistan (CSTC-A), within the Office of Security Cooperation–Afghanistan. The head of the office, Maj. Gen. Robert Durbin, introduced changes in the ANA, which included establishing the Afghan National Army Air Corps, the Commandos, and the Afghan National Civil Order Force. These measures were intended to increase the government's presence, train Afghan soldiers to join coalition special forces on raids, and create more heavily armed police. The ANA's involvement alongside coalition forces during operations such as Medusa was seen as progress, even though significant challenges remained. Although the army and police had borne the brunt of the insurgency, they had not been designed to fight on that scale. The ANA also experienced significant desertion. As of late 2006, the ANA's structure included the 201st Corps in Kabul (two brigades, one in Kunar Province); the 203rd Corps in Gardez (one brigade each in Khost and Paktia); the 205th Corps in Kandahar (one brigade each in Helmand, Kandahar and Zabul); the 207th Corps in Herat (one brigade each in Shindand and Farah); and the 209th Corps in Mazar-e-Sharif, with one brigade. It had approximately 46,177 troops in January 2007.

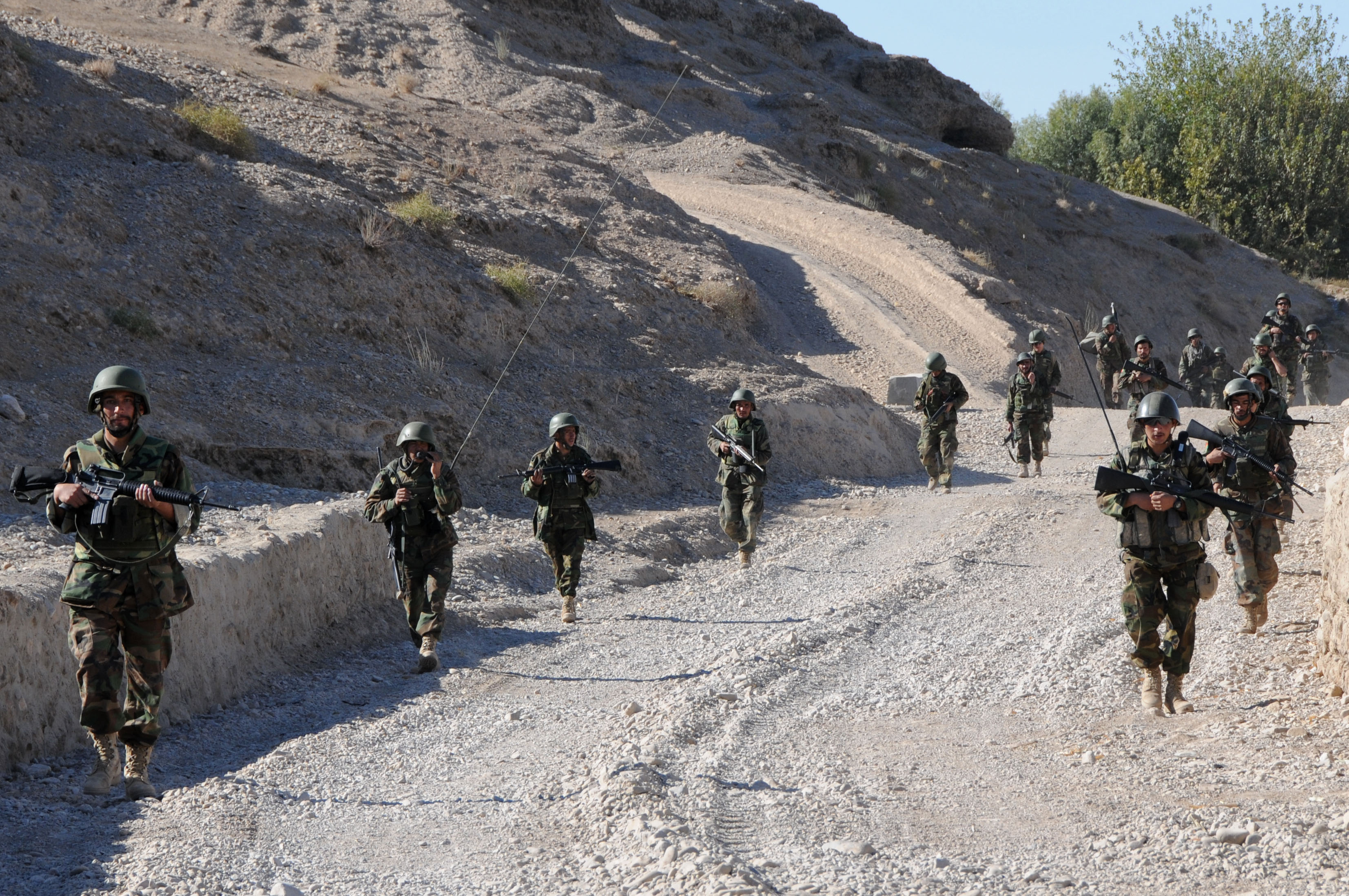
An Afghan National Army patrol in Deh Rawood, Uruzgan Province, 1 June 2007.

During early 2007, ANA units worked with coalition forces in southeastern Afghanistan to support provincial governments by clearing insurgents, handing over secured areas to the police, and creating the conditions for development projects. There countless patrols and small-scale engagements, with a special focus on Afghan National Highway 1, which connected Kabul with the south and east. In the summer of 2007, the 203rd Corps launched Operation Maiwand—named after the 19th-century Afghan victory over the British Empire—in the Ghazni Province, which was unprecedented in scale for the ANA. It also increased cooperation between the ANA and the Afghan National Police (ANP). Around that time the ISAF began assisting the Afghan Border Police, along with the ANA, which wanted to increase coordination between the army and the border guards, as they worked to reduce the warlord presence in the borderlands and the flow of Taliban and Al-Qaeda fighters from Pakistan.

Although ISAF commander Gen. Dan K. McNeill intended the eastern border regions to be the main focus in 2007, the Taliban continued guerilla attacks on Afghan and coalition forces throughout the south. This was especially true in northern Helmand's Musa Qala District, which was captured by the Taliban before being retaken in December 2007. In Kandahar, the Taliban used the Arghandab District as a staging ground in preparation for an attempt to take Kandahar City. The ANA had grown to 57,000 soldiers by the end of 2007. Around that time plans were announced to quadruple the number of training teams operating under CSTC-A, as part of the effort to grow the force up to its target strength. The Air Corps also continued to develop, with 165 veteran pilots, who had 2,500 flight hours on average. They received a fleet of largely former Soviet aircraft to provide logistical support to the ANA, and in 2007 a new headquarters was opened at Kabul International Airport. In November 2007, the recently formed 1st Commando Kandak conducted Operation Commando Fury in Kapisa Province. Though he was concerned by the defeats of 2006 and 2007, Karzai did not pay much attention to the Afghan army, and rarely spoke to the troops or praised their sacrifice. Bismillah Khan placed many of his loyalists, who were often Tajiks, in key positions within the ANA.

In March 2008, the NCO academy was opened at the Kabul Military Training Center. As of that month, the ANA was leading the majority of named operations being undertaken. The Taliban still expanded its control over Kandahar and Helmand during 2008. In June 2008, the Taliban attacked Sarposa prison in Kandahar City, freeing 400 of its members, and then seized villages across the Arghandab District, while the ANA sent 1,000 troops from the north as reinforcements. More than 100 Taliban fighters were killed in one of the ANA's largest operations up to that point, alongside ISAF troops. After two days, the Taliban fighters gathered in Arghandab withdrew after taking heavy losses, including much of their "shadow government" for Kandahar. However, the Taliban later returned and still had control over the area. In the fall of 2008, the ANA and coalition forces conducted operations in Kandahar and Helmand meant to pressure the Taliban, but it did not have much impact. A decision was made to expand the ANA to a new target strength of 134,000 in September 2008, and it had about 68,000 troops around that time. The US wanted to close its outposts in remote mountain valleys of eastern Afghanistan during that year, but Bismillah Khan and defense minister Rahim Wardak argued against it. They wanted the coalition to do more to prevent the Taliban from expanding its influence into provinces surrounding Kabul. Once the US did eventually withdraw from its outposts in Kunar and Nuristan in early 2010, the ANA and police were better able to maintain control over the area, because the locals that opposed the US presence were less inclined to fight Afghans.

=== Transition to independence ===
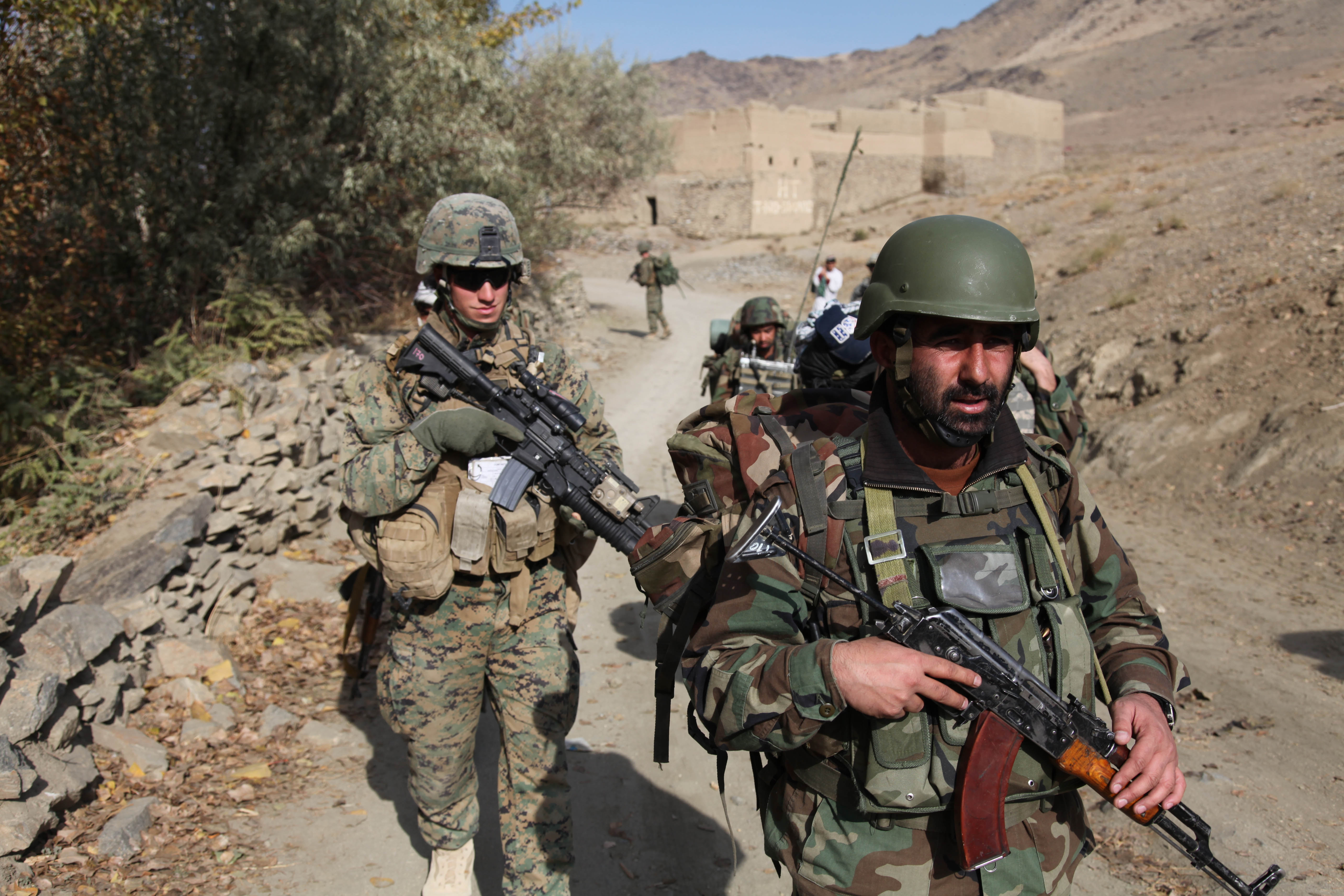
A US marine and an Afghan soldier on a joint patrol in October 2009.

Between the fall of 2008 and early 2009, the Taliban expanded its attacks. There was concern in the US that the pro-Western Afghan government in Kabul could fall. In January 2009, President Barack Obama, who prioritized the situation in Afghanistan over Iraq, deployed an additional 17,000 US troops primarily to the country's south and east, with another 4,000 for the training of the Afghan forces. In May 2009, Gen. Stanley McChrystal became the ISAF commander, and he changed the ANA from a smaller and slowly built force to a larger and quickly built one. In the fall of 2009, Obama decided that the US would "transition" the war to the Afghan government over five years, though he left open the possibility for US troops to remain in the country beyond that. He accepted McChrystal's request for additional troops, but decided that the drawdown would begin in July 2011. The ANA reached its original goal of 70,000 soldiers during 2009.

In preparation for the 2009 Afghan presidential election, the ANA and ISAF began Operation Panther's Claw in June 2009 in the area of Regional Command South. It was the first of several missions in Helmand remove the Taliban presence ahead of the election. Although there was success in securing Taliban-held parts of Helmand, the death toll among Afghan troops between April and October 2009 increased by 87% compared to the same time period in 2008. In November 2009, the NATO Training Mission–Afghanistan (NTM-A) was established as part of the increased effort to improve and expand Afghan forces, and its commander, Lt. Gen. William B. Caldwell IV, was dual-hatted as the commander of CSTC-A. Although more than a dozen ANA battalions and Air Corps squadrons were capable of operating with minimal coalition support, and most training courses in Kabul were led by Afghan instructors, the force still had many problems overall, including desertion, drug use, cowardice, and a lack of discipline. Furthermore, some in the ANA believed that the police were incapable of holding territory that was retaken from insurgents by the army.

One of the initiatives Caldwell took to increase the capability of the ANA and professionalize the force was to mandate literacy courses for all soldiers, after having estimated that only 14% of Afghan recruits were able to read, write, or count. There was also an effort to make Afghan soldiers more involved in patrols, leader engagements, and outpost security. The operations in the summer of 2009 helped shape the battlefield in preparation for an assault on the Taliban stronghold of Marjah in Helmand Province, though it was delayed until February 2010 due to the election and other issues. Operation Moshtarak became the first operation of its scale to be done in partnership with the ANA, and on this occasion Afghan government personnel and resources were made ready to follow the military and restore Afghan state authority to isolated communities. ANA and coalition troops began their assault on Marjah on 13 February, along with airlifting some troops into the city center. President Karzai was able to visit the city in mid-March, but as in previous operations, the tactical victories did not immediately pacify the area, and its reintegration with the Afghan government was slow. ISAF's Regional Command South was split with the creation of Regional Command Southwest in the summer of 2010, and at the same time, the ANA created the 215th Corps for Helmand, which was previously under the 205th Corps based in Kandahar.

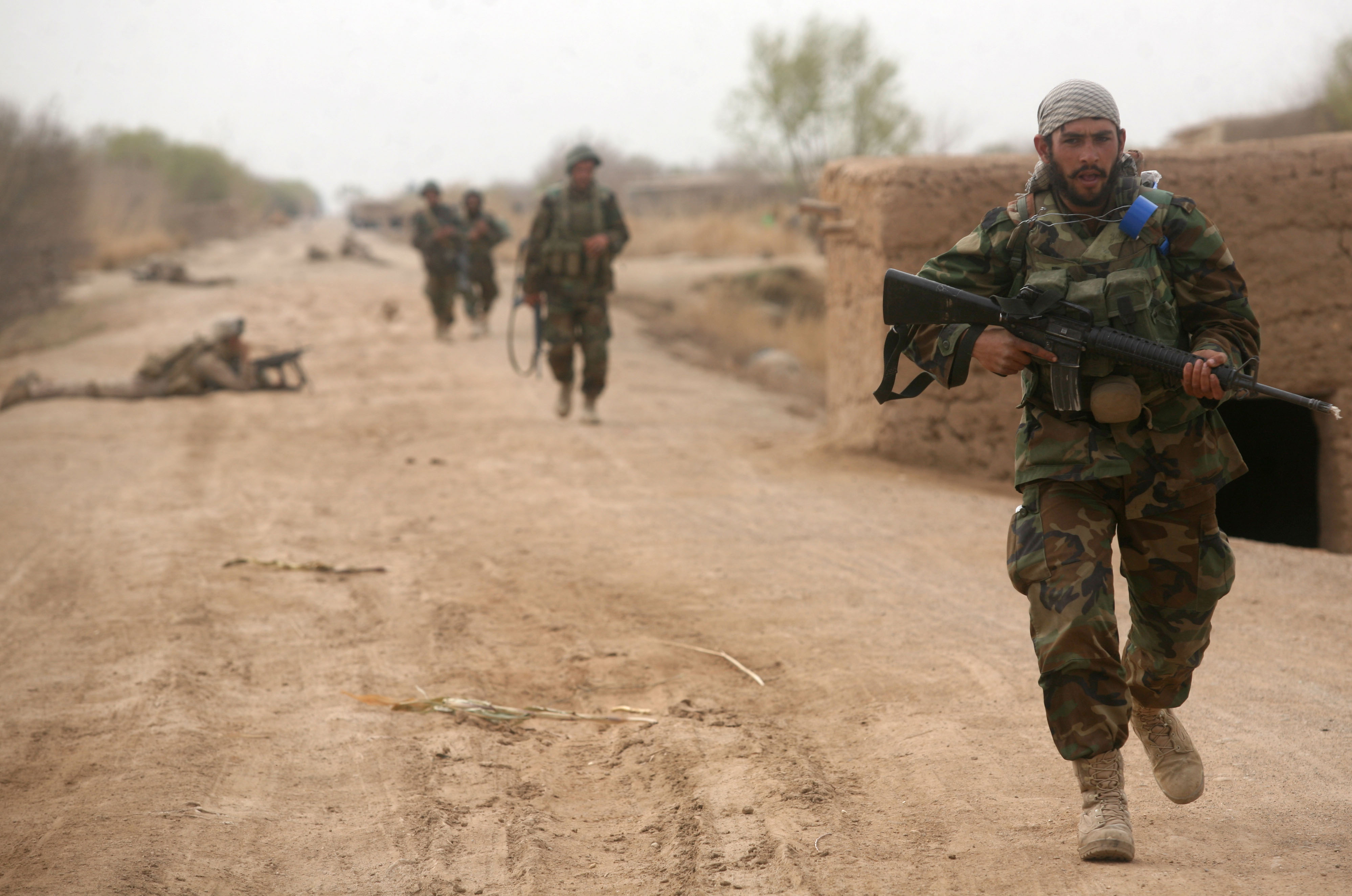

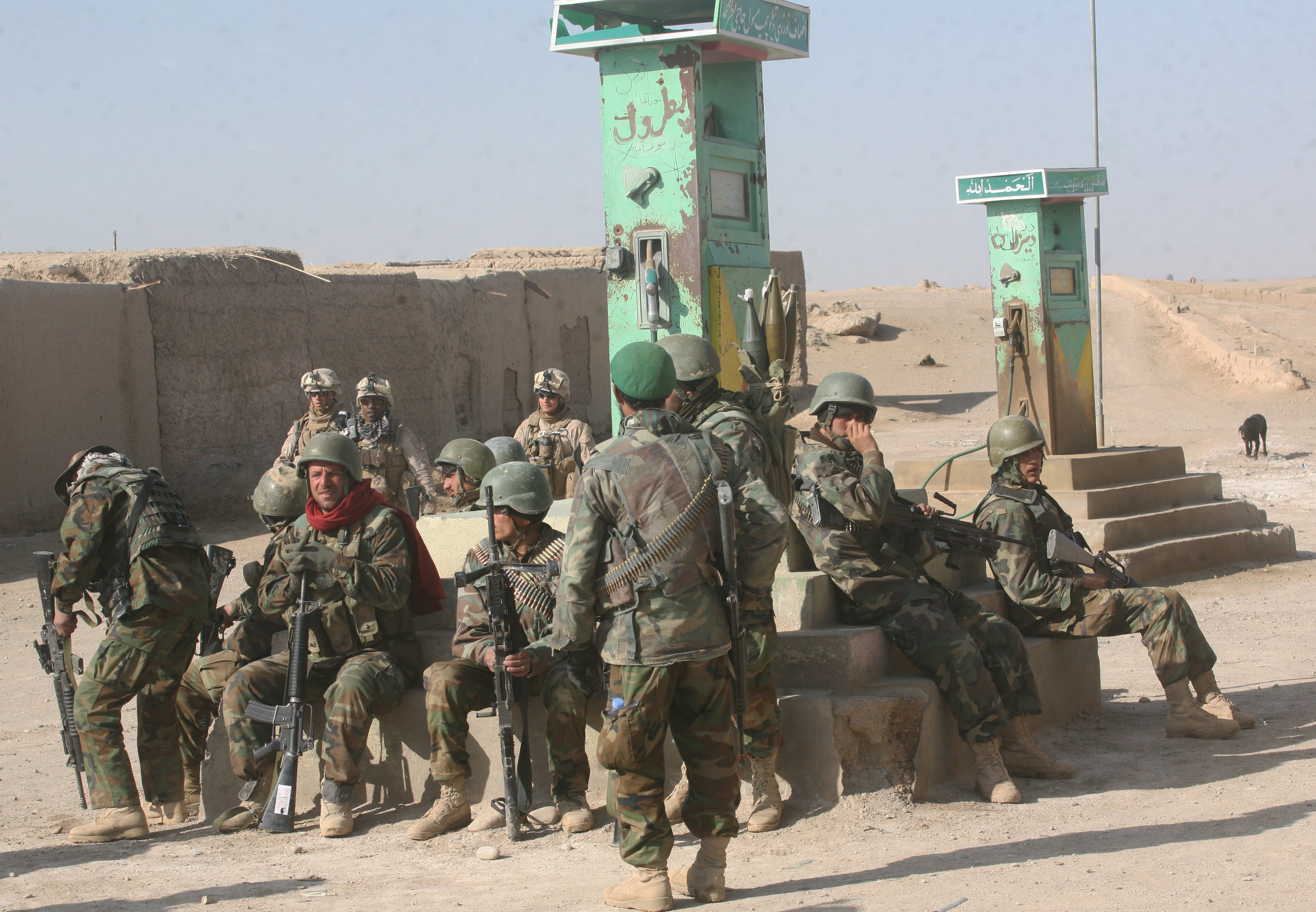
Afghan soldiers in Marjah during Operation Moshtarak, 2010.

Operation Hamkari, intended to secure Kandahar City, began in June 2010 by increasing ANA and police checkpoints around the city. The Afghan and coalition forces carried out shaping operations around the city, and the second phase began in July, when ANA Commandos working with US special operations units began clearing out the Taliban from their stronghold. The final phase, Operation Dragon Strike, began in September 2010, when the ANA and ISAF began clearing out the Taliban presence along Highway 1. The regular army and the coalition was assisted by Abdul Raziq's effective border police, which was essentially an Achakzai tribal militia. The ANA in Kandahar consisted of many Tajiks, and were seen as outsiders by the locals, despite their attempts to improve relations with them. The coalition worked with village leaders to raise local militias, which became the basis for a proposed Afghan Local Police (ALP). The initiative was opposed by US ambassador Eikenberry, but supported by McChrystal and his replacement, Gen. David Petraeus. Petreaus hoped to replicate the "Sunni awakening" in Iraq, and convinced Karzai of the idea, who initially opposed it before giving Petreaus his approval. The ALP was under the Ministry of Interior, which was led at the time by former ANA chief Bismillah Khan.

The end of Moshtarak, Hamkari, and Dragon Strike in late 2010 concluded large-scale operations by the ANA and ISAF, and the focus shifted to holding and building, though smaller-scale fighting with the Taliban continued. As of December 2010, the ANA had 148,352 personnel. The new 215th Corps in Helmand had been increased to a size of three brigades, and government control was restored to much of the province. Abdul Raziq was appointed Kandahar police chief in April 2011, and he improved discipline and professionalism among the Kandahar police forces. The US and Raziq's Afghan army and police forces significantly improved security in Kandahar City. There was also increased activity against the insurgency in the north by the 209th Corps and the ANP, along with ISAF's Regional Command North, in late 2010 and early 2011. The US and NATO announced in late 2010 that they would remove most of their combat troops from Afghanistan by the end of 2014, at which point the ANA and ANP would take full responsibility for security. By the fall of 2012, Kandahar had been largely secured, and progress was made in improving the Afghan security forces.

In 2013 the Afghan government was at its greatest territorial control over the country since the start of the insurgency. The ANA had begun to take responsibility for security in parts of Afghanistan from ISAF beginning in July 2011. The ISAF gradually replaced combat brigades with support brigades in areas where ANA units took the lead. This was not done in the most unstable parts of the country, such as Helmand and Kandahar, until 2014. The 2013 fighting season saw an increase in the size of Taliban attacks on ANA and police forces, which sometimes involved up to 600 men attempting to capture a post. Attacks on that scale had been rare in 2011 or 2012. In northern Helmand the ANA preferred to stay close to their bases near main roads and towns, giving the police a key role in fighting the insurgency. Overall, the situation was a stalemate.

The fraud controversy in the 2014 Afghan presidential election had an effect on the ANA, because Tajik soldiers were concerned that the election had been stolen from the Tajik candidate, Abdullah Abdullah, on behalf of the Pashtun, Ashraf Ghani. Although the influential Gen. Bismillah Khan remained apolitical, some ANA officers from the north and west sided with Abdullah. After a US diplomatic intervention, Ghani became president and a national unity government was established with Abdullah's camp. The Taliban launched its 2014 offensive after the election had concluded, with the intention of expanding its control in Helmand, Kandahar, Ghazni, and Kunduz. In Kandahar, Abdul Raziq was effective at coordinating an army and police response to Taliban attacks, and utilized ANA troops alongside the police. The Taliban offensive there failed. However, in Helmand, the ANA leadership was divided, with commanders who were uninterested in preparing defenses; and the troops did not want to be front-line infantry. The Taliban was able to overrun the out-gunned local police in northern Helmand, which fought with limited support from the army, by the end of 2014. Gains were likewise made by the Taliban against government forces in other provinces. Around 5,000 troops and policemen were killed during the 2014 campaign. On 28 December 2014, ISAF transferred responsibility for military operations to the ANA, leaving behind the NATO Resolute Support Mission to train and advise Afghan forces.

=== Post-ISAF withdrawal ===
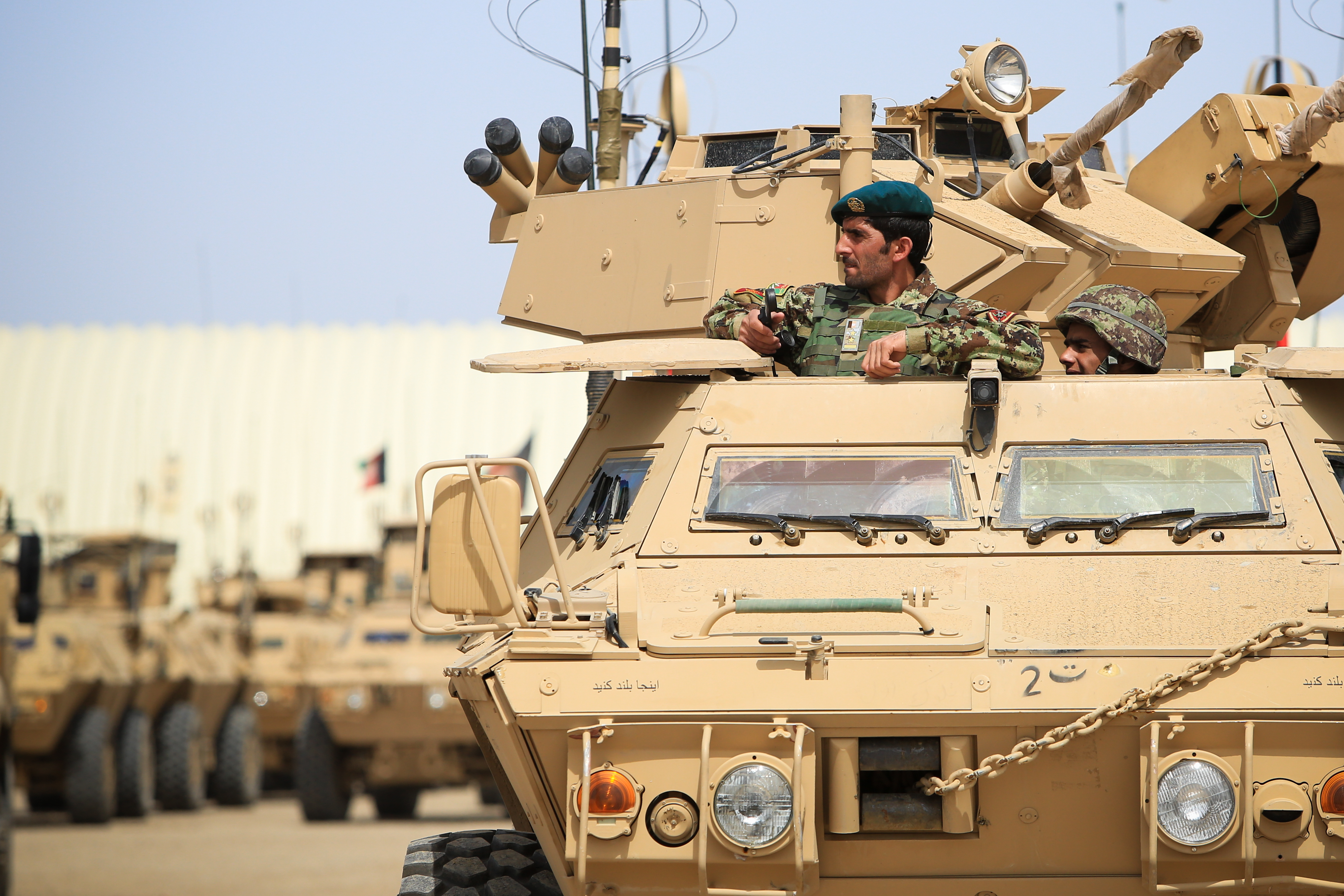
An M1117 armored security vehicle in ANA service during an exercise in Helmand Province, 2014.

Starting from 1 January 2015, the ANA and other Afghan security agencies were fully responsible for military operations in Afghanistan. The new president, Ashraf Ghani, took a larger role in the war effort than his predecessor. He praised the ANA and the sacrifices of the soldiers, and spoke to corps commanders weekly or sometimes daily. But there were disagreements over key appointments in the national unity government, and after Bismillah Khan was removed as defense minister, the ministry was left without a confirmed leader for most of 2015. The power struggle between Abdullah and Ghani prevented them from focusing their full attention on the war effort, and it had effects on the security forces. Corruption increased, morale declined, and supply acquisition for the front-line units was delayed. In 2016, Ghani decided to centralize command and control for the ANSF around his office as the commander-in-chief by putting all military, police, and intelligence operations and appointments under its oversight.

In January 2015 the Islamic State recognized a new regional branch in Afghanistan, which was formed by members of the Pakistani Taliban that had been allowed to live in Nangarhar Province by the Afghan National Directorate of Security (NDS). The group committed atrocities against Afghan civilians, soldiers and police, and Taliban. In May 2015, Islamic State fighters threatened Nangarhar's capital Jalalabad. A series of uncoordinated ANA and Taliban counteroffensives between the summer of 2015 and January 2016 pushed them back into the mountains and rural areas.

In August 2015 the Taliban launched its largest offensive since 2006, targeting provincial capitals for the purpose of forcing the Afghan government to reach a compromise. When of the main targets was Kunduz city in the province of Kunduz. Attacks beginning in April managed to reach the outskirts of the city. The Taliban spent months preparing to take the city itself, which was defended by about 3,000 soldiers, police, and militiamen. The police and militia fighters were tired and demoralized by months of fighting. When the Taliban began their assault on Kunduz on 28 September, the regular ANA and police forces disintegrated, despite outnumbering the attackers, being better armed, having fortified positions, and suffering few casualties. Many of them abandoned their posts and fled to the city's airfield. By 29 September, the Taliban had control of the entire city except the airfield and captured large amounts of ANA equipment. It was the first time during the US war in Afghanistan that the Taliban captured a provincial capital, and became a major crisis for Ghani.

ANA Special Forces Commandos in the Kunduz Province, 3 June 2013.

Resolute Support commander Gen. John Campbell ordered the ANA Special Operations commander to "go save Kunduz." Afghan Commando units were airlifted into the center of the city along with two Green Beret teams on 1 October. The Battle of Kunduz became one of the few instances of urban warfare during the war. House-to-house fighting with the Taliban in the town center and narrow streets lasted for several days. Kunduz was retaken on 5 October. Only the Commandos and their US advisors prevented a total defeat of the ANA in Kunduz. The battle was a strategic victory for the Taliban, which demonstrated its ability to capture a province. It also reduced confidence in the army among Afghans. The Taliban's success inspired sympathizers to launch attacks in other parts of the country. The ANA would also fail to remove the Taliban from districts around Kunduz city. Ghani rescinded an earlier order for the ANA to not call for American airstrikes.

In October 2015 the Taliban began a series of offensives in central Helmand, during which many well-equipped ANA and police forces abandoned their positions and fled. The 215th Corps nearly collapsed. Though the arrival of Commandos and US Special Forces prevented the fall of Marjah or the provincial capital Lashkar Gah, the Taliban offensive undid the gains of Operation Moshtarak in 2010. The Taliban advances, their largest since the 2006 offensive, along with much more limited US air support caused morale among Afghan forces to plummet by the end of 2015. ANA recruiting numbers fell below the losses from attrition for the first time. ANSF total casualties during the year were 20,000, compared to 15,000 in 2014. The Afghan military's setbacks in the fall of 2015, especially in Kunduz, also caused Obama to change his plans about a total US withdrawal. In June 2016 he granted the request of Campbell's successor, Gen. John Nicholson, to conduct airstrikes in support of Afghan army and police forces when there was a risk that the government may lose terrain. By early 2016, the Taliban became well-equipped with captured ANA gear and weapons. As of 2016 the ANA had 169,229 personnel.

During the 2016 fighting season that began in May, the Taliban captured the defenses around Lashkar Gah, where the police largely fought on their own when the ANA 215th Corps commander did not support them. The Taliban began simultaneous attacks in October on Lashkar Gah; Tarinkot in Uruzgan; Farah City in Farah; and Kunduz City in Kunduz. Tarinkot was nearly captured along with a portion of Highway 1, causing Abdul Raziq to launch a government counteroffensive to prevent the fall of the city with US air support. The attacks on Farah City did not advance past the outskirts. In Kunduz, the Taliban made it to the city center as the regular forces collapsed, before being driven out by ANA Commandos and US advisors. Police forces in Lashkar Gah held out and were reinforced by Commandos. The city was visited by Nicholson and defense minister Abdullah Habibi. Ghani replaced the 215th Corps commander with Commando general Wali Mohammad Ahmadzai, who personally led a counterattack against the Taliban. More than 4,500 Afghan soldiers and police were killed between March and August 2016, and the government increasingly relied on ANA Commandos as the regular forces were incapable of holding ground. The Afghan Air Force was overstretched while trying to provide support to units in the besieged cities. Although the Afghan military held the four provincial capitals with US backing, they remained surrounded. By the end of 2016 the Taliban was in its strongest position since before the 2009 allied troop surge.

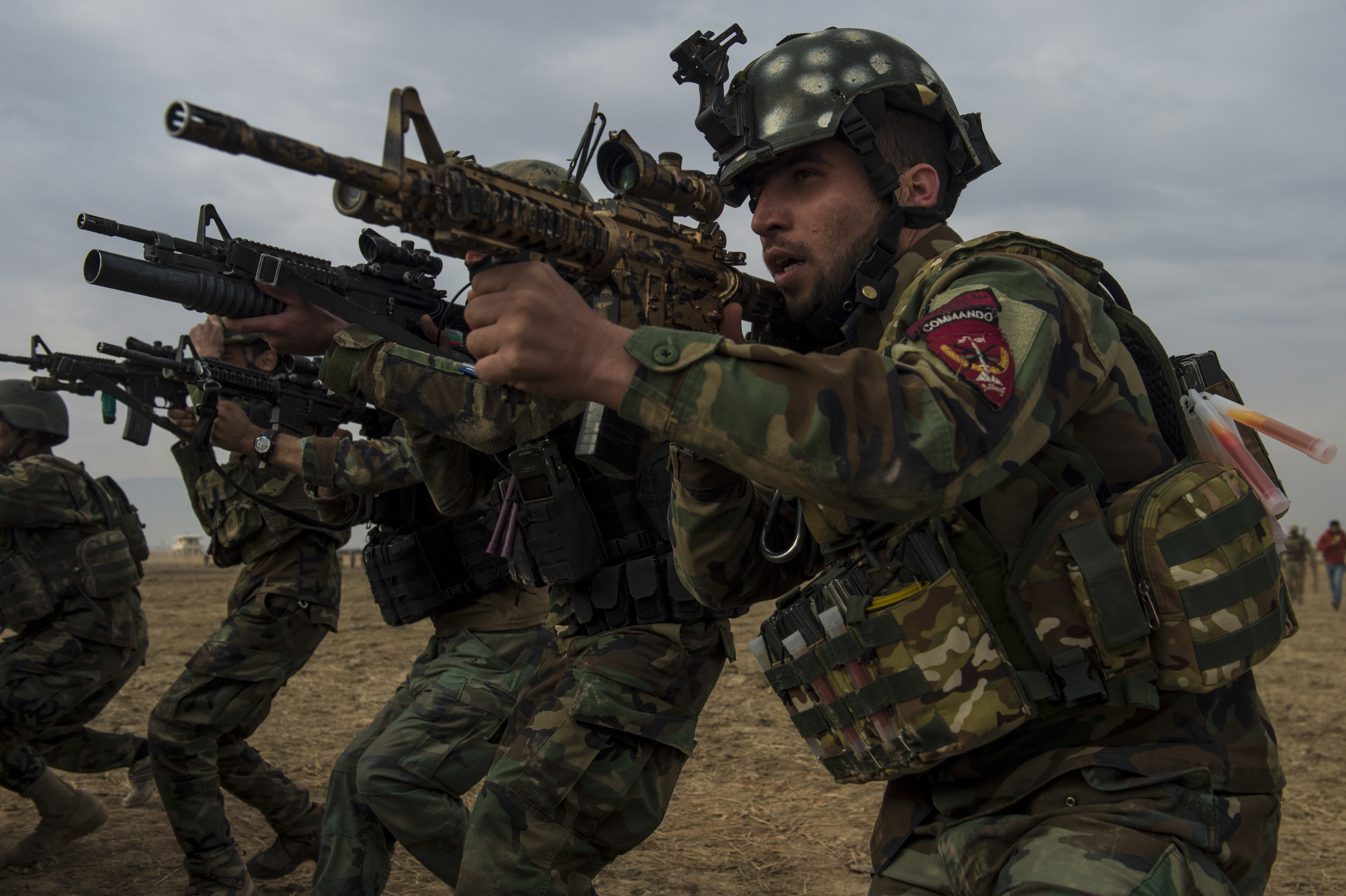
Afghan Commandos during a live fire exercise, 12 February 2018. The ANA became dependent on commandos after the ISAF withdrawal.

In the first half of 2017 Nicholson presented a plan to President Donald Trump that involved sending more US troops, including advisors for the ANA, and to double the size of the Afghan Commandos. Trump put off the issue, before accepting the proposal in August 2017. Trump also authorized the full resumption of US airstrikes. The Taliban then changed strategy, avoiding direct combat with US-backed ANA forces, and focused on lesser-defended areas and suicide bombings in cities. Wali Mohammad Ahmadzai's forces pushed back Taliban fighters from around Lashkar Gah, while working with US advisors. Ghani made an effort to remove officers that were deemed too ineffective, but was often unable to find adequate replacements. He also dismantled the network of Tajik officers that were loyal to Bismillah Khan, which reduced enlistment and support for the government among Tajiks. Although Nicholson was able to provide enough US advisors to help the Afghans hold key provincial capitals in the 2018 fighting season, the Taliban nearly captured Farah City in May and Ghazni in August. Both had to be retaken by Afghan and US special forces. There was a brief ceasefire in the summer of 2018, during which Afghan soldiers met and spent time with Taliban fighters in many parts of the country. In January 2019, Ghani said that the army and police had taken 45,000 casualties since late 2014.

=== US withdrawal, collapse, and aftermath ===
In 2018, the United States began negotiations with the Taliban towards achieving a complete troop withdrawal. The Taliban launched offensives in Kunduz, Baghlan, and Farah provinces during the 2019 fighting season, but Afghan and US forces, overseen by defense minister Asadullah Khalid and Gen. Austin S. Miller, were able to fight them off. At Miller's request, the ANA shifted from focusing on defending population centers and corps-level clearing operations in Taliban territory to Commando raids on Taliban targets and airstrikes by the Afghan Air Force. However, the regular forces were still spread out across more than 10,000 static checkpoints. The government also started using Commandos to guard cities recently retaken from the Taliban. In July 2019, The Long War Journal observed that "casualties are at an all time high, and the cumulative effect on morale of Afghan forces cannot easily be measured since elite forces and military and police bases are overrun with shocking regularity, at this point on a near daily basis." The 17 September 2019 bombings in Kabul caused Trump to briefly call off negotiations. The United States–Taliban deal signed on 29 February 2020 committed the US to withdraw its troops within 14 months in return for a commitment from the Taliban regarding Al-Qaeda, and declared that intra-Afghan negotiations would begin.

The Afghan military went into an "active defense posture" immediately after the agreement. Many security posts were consolidated into a smaller number of patrol bases. As of June 2020, the total strength of the ANA (including the AAF, ANCOF, ABF, and ANASOC) was at 178,815 personnel. By mid-2020 the Taliban was imposing a siege on Afghanistan's major cities, including 15 out of 34 provincial capitals as of early 2021. In October 2020, the Taliban conducted an offensive in Kandahar that seized much of the province. Between 2017 and early 2021, the number of districts under government control declined from 217 to 129, out of the total 407. The Taliban infiltrated the countryside around major cities all over Afghanistan and cut off many roads, including portions of the national "ring highway," in the lead-up to the 2021 Taliban offensive. Continued logistical problems had caused the ANA to transition from a "pull" logistics system to one in which the Ministry of Defense sent supplies on a timetable using convoys. By early 2021, the convoy deliveries were unreliable because the Taliban cut off much of the road network, and ground forces had to depend on weekly supply flights from the AAF.

In January 2021 the ANA had 185,478 personnel. After President Joe Biden's April 2021 withdrawal announcement, the Taliban refused to attend talks with the Afghan government and increased attacks across Afghanistan. On 1 May, around the start of the traditional spring and summer fighting season, the US began its withdrawal, and the Taliban launched attacks on the ANA in multiple provinces. There were retreats from multiple bases and checkpoints in the provinces of Laghman and Baghlan, near Kabul. In some cases the Taliban negotiated the withdrawal of Afghan soldiers in return for their weapons and equipment. In others, the Afghan troops fought until they ran out of supplies. In early June 2021 there was fierce fighting in 24 provinces, with districts being overrun in several of them. By mid-June the control of Afghan forces decreased to 94 districts, while the Taliban fully controlled 104 districts. Although the ANA did retake some of them, there were many more districts being lost. In late June, ANA Commandos and regular forces, assisted by "public uprising" militias, retook key areas in Faryab, Baghlan, and Paktia. Overall, the ANA lost 127 districts and retook 10 during June.

In early July 2021 the Taliban continued advancing, though attempts to capture major cities were fought off, and there was strong resistance in the Kabul Province. As of mid-July the ANA's control declined to 73 districts, and the Taliban's increased to 216. By the end of the month, civilian casualty rates amidst the ongoing fighting were the highest ever recorded during the war. The Commandos and the AAF, which were being used to make up for the defeats of the regular ground troops, became exhausted. In the first week of August the Taliban captured their first provincial capital, Zaranj in Nimruz Province, after the ANA there retreated across the nearby border into Iran. Fierce fighting took place in several other provincial capitals. On 11 August, the ANA's 217th Corps collapsed and was overrun at the Kunduz Airport. Multiple provincial capitals fell over the next few days, and on 14–15 August, the government lost control of the military, with six of the seven regional corps having surrendered or been overrun. President Ghani fled the country. The 201st Corps east of Kabul and the 111th Capital Division also collapsed on the 15th. In some areas, such as Kandahar City, ANA soldiers continued to fight the Taliban for up to another month. Some Commandos surrendered after running out of supplies or being abandoned by their allies, while others made their way to Panjshir Province to join the Republican insurgency in Afghanistan. A few Commandos provided security at Hamid Karzai International Airport during the final stage of the US evacuation from Kabul, which ended on 30 August 2021. After the ANA distintegrated, the Taliban "regularly" made use of former ANA soldiers and officers in the administration and technical aspects of the reconstituted Afghan Armed Forces. Units of the new military often used the same designations and structures as the ANA.

== Personnel ==
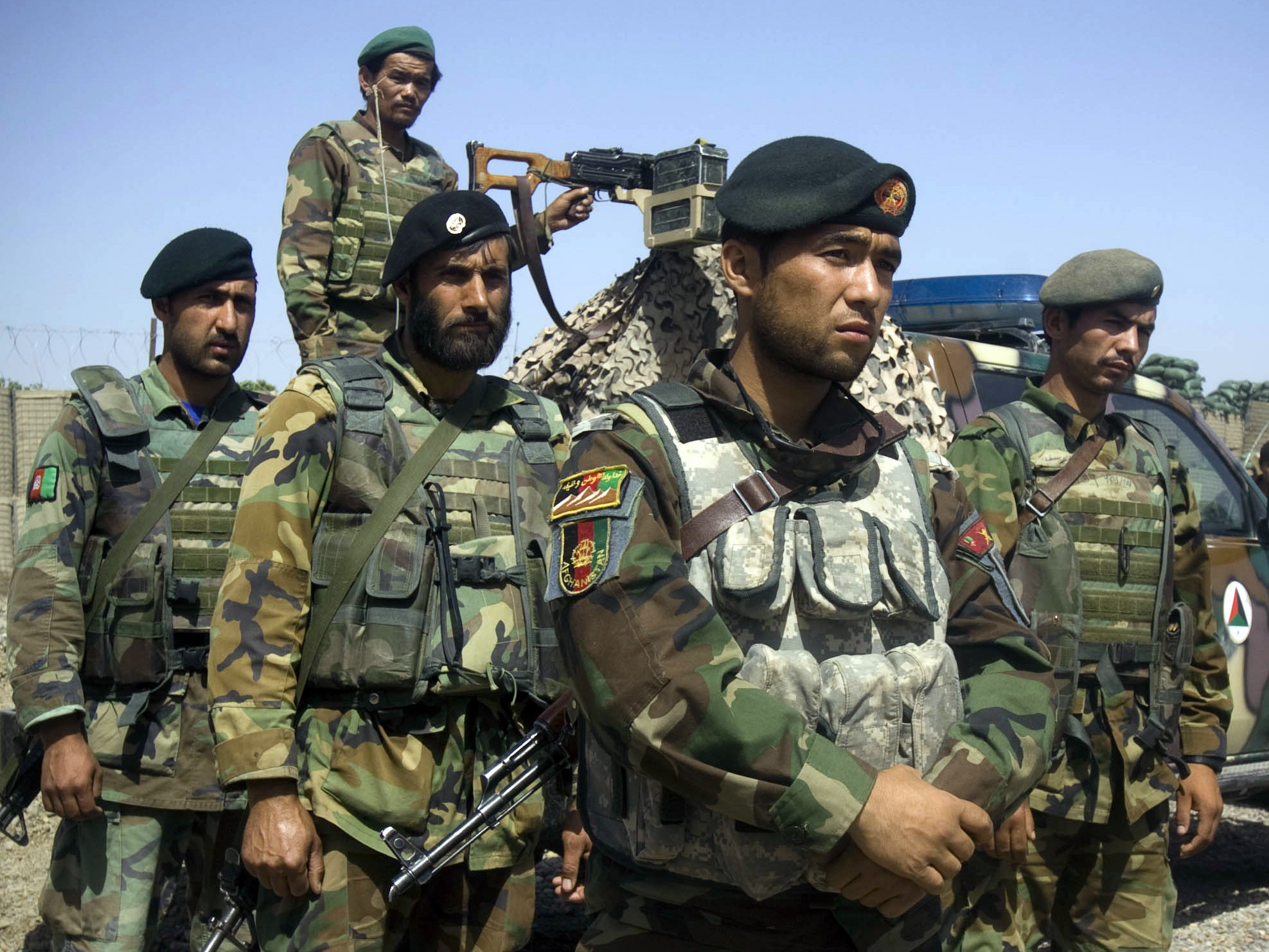
A squad of ANA soldiers at a recruiting and information event to inform residents about military service.

The ANA's doctrinal manual, known as The Afghan National Army or ANA-1, described the values that guided the force and its personnel. Soldiers took an oath to "God, Country, and Duty." There was an effort to recruit a force that proportionately represented the ethnic groups of Afghanistan (42% Pashtun, 27% Tajik, 9% Hazara, 9% Uzbek, and 15% various smaller groups). However, as of 2010, Tajiks were over-represented among the officer corps and non-commissioned officer corps, while Hazaras and Uzbeks were significantly under-represented. Pashtuns were represented proportionately, though recruitment was low among Pashtuns from the south, the center of the insurgency. Although the ANA met or exceeded its recruitment goals, it faced the difficulties in finding quality soldiers, because of drug use, low literacy, and the lack of education. Recruiting officer and NCO candidates was particularly difficult. One estimate found that literacy among ANA enlisted soldiers was 11%, among NCOs 30%, and among officers almost 90%.

As of 2011, the ANA Training Command had an annual capacity to graduate 2,300 officers, 4,000 non-commissioned officers, and 14,000 enlisted soldiers. Its facilities had 251 courses at the time, covering virtually every specialty that would be found in a Western army or air force. The Kabul Military Training Center, established in 2002, was located east of the capital. It was the main facility of the Afghan Ministry of Defense that provided basic training as well as advanced combat training, including branch-specific training. The latter included the armor, artillery, human resources, signal, infantry, engineer, legal, military police, logistics, religious/cultural, intelligence, and finance branch schools. Other key training establishments of the army included the Bridmal NCO Academy, the National Military Academy of Afghanistan, and the Afghan Command and General Staff College. There were also eventually six regional training centers in addition to the KMTC. The Afghan Air Force conducted its officer and enlisted airman ground school training at the "Big Air School" (Pohantoon-e-Hawayee; PeH), while flight training was done in the United States or the United Arab Emirates.

When the ANA was founded in 2002, enlisted soldiers were paid US$50 per month, non-commissioned officers up to $70, and officers $150. Because the army experienced high desertion in 2003, in part due to the low pay, it was increased. As of 2009, a first-year soldier was paid up to $170 per month, senior enlisted $260-280 per month, a second lieutenant $240-260, and a general $930-950.

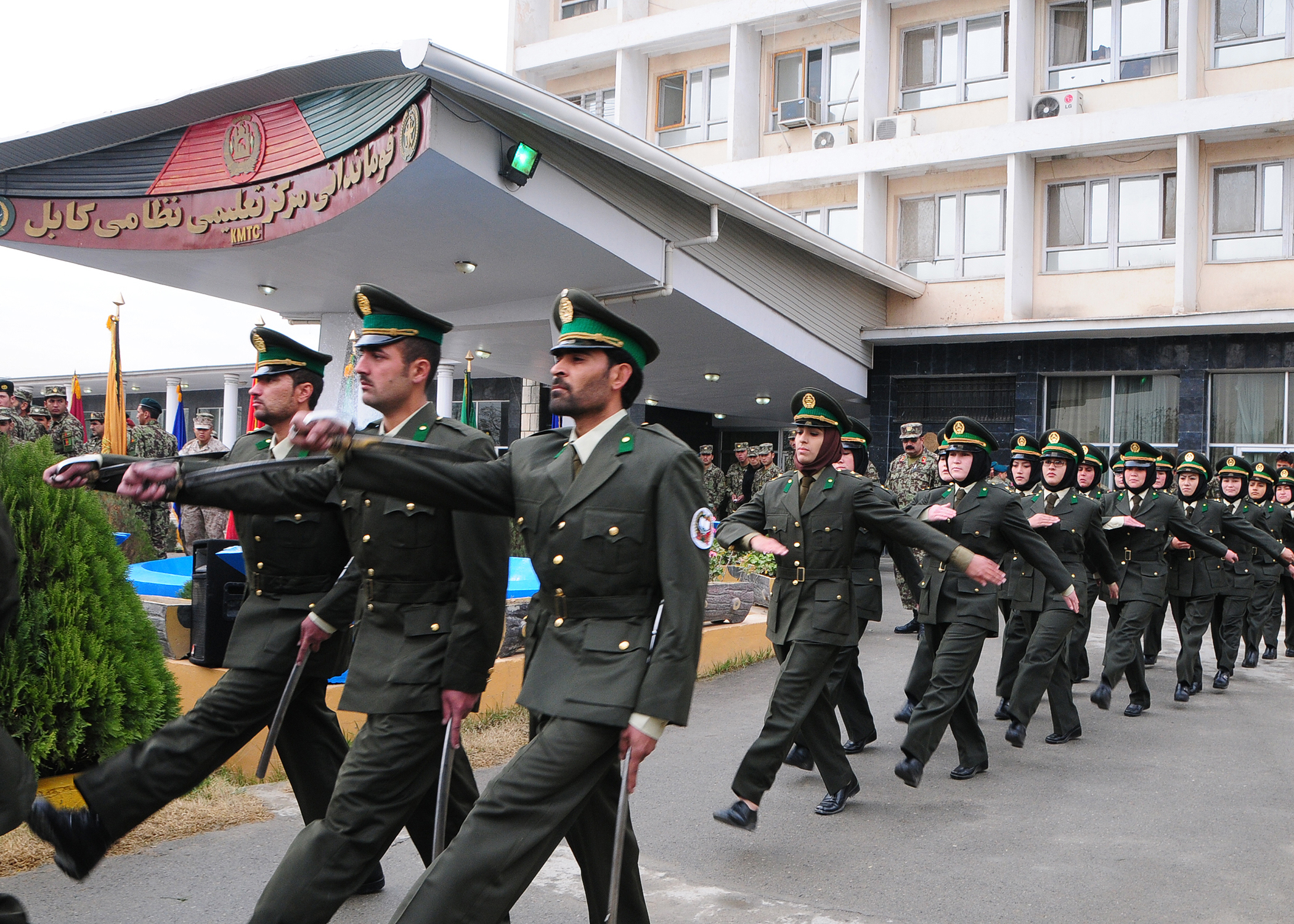
Fourteen female ANA soldiers marching into their graduation ceremony at the Kabul Military Training Center

US policy called for boosting the army's size to 134,000 soldiers by October 2010. By May 2010 the Afghan Army had accomplished this interim goal and was on track to reach its ultimate number of 171,000 by 2011. Actual numbers (as opposed to planned numbers) were around 164,000 in May 2011. This increase in Afghan troops allowed the US to begin withdrawing its forces in July 2011.

Due to the strong Taliban insurgency and many other problems, the ANA steadily expanded. An increasing number of female soldiers joined. By early 2013, reports stated that there were 200,000 ANA troops. However, the Special Inspector General for Afghanistan Reconstruction (SIGAR) said in January 2013:

Determining ANSF strength is fraught with challenges. US and coalition forces rely on the Afghan forces to report their own personnel strength numbers. ..[T]he Combined Security Transition Command-Afghanistan.. noted that.. there is "no viable method of validating [the ANA's] personnel numbers."

Troop levels
Number of soldiers on duty	Year(s)
90,000	1978
60,000 (All MOD troops)	1979
25–35,000	1980–1982
35–40,000	1983–1985
49,000 (4,000 regular/trained)	2003 (Hamid Karzai)
1,750	2003
13,000	2004
21,200	2005
26,900	2006
50,000	2007
80,000	2008
90,000	2009
134,000	2010
164,000	2011
200,000	2012
194,000	2014

Total Afghan Armed Forces manpower was approximately 186,000 as of 2021.

=== Officers ===
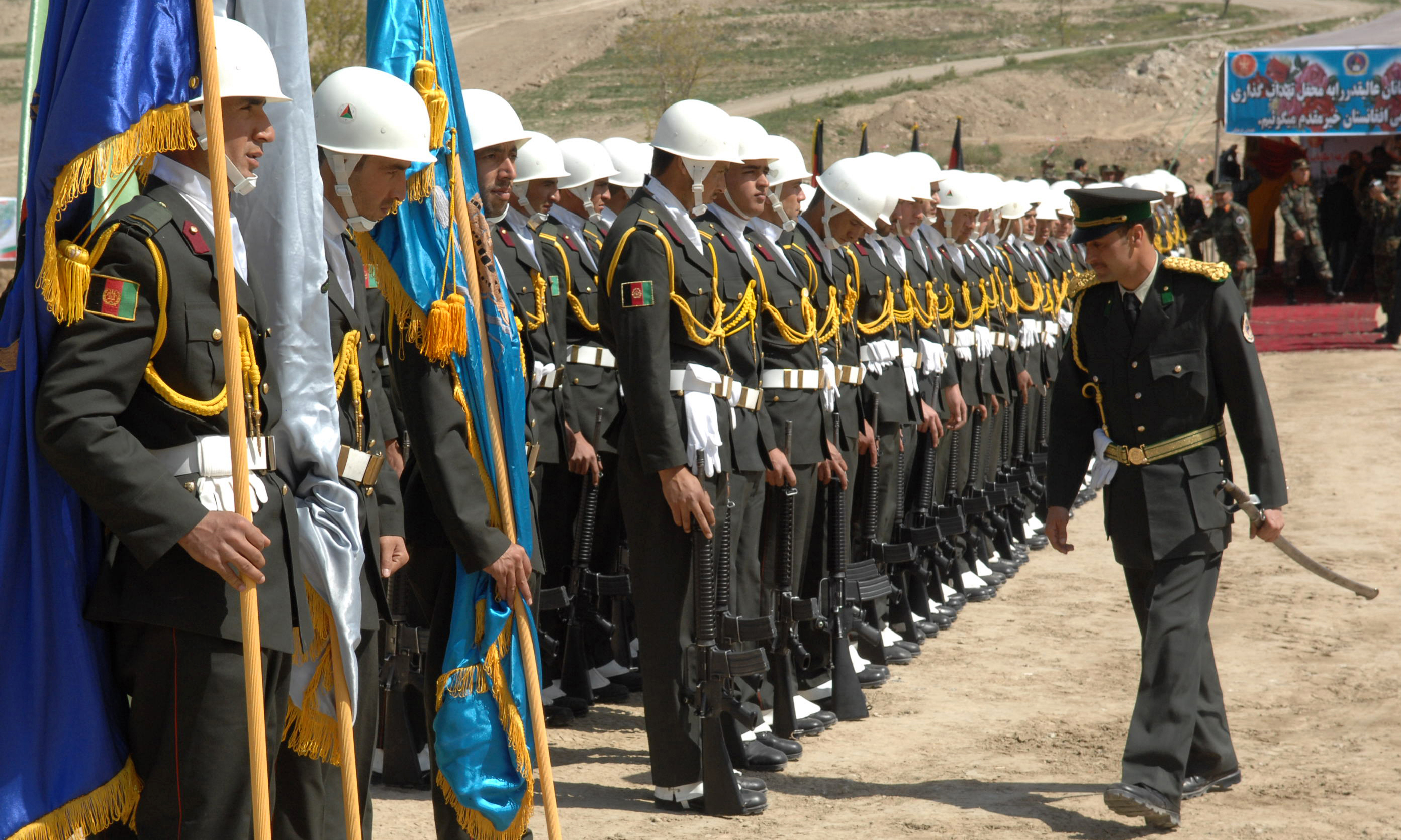
Cadets of the National Military Academy of Afghanistan, on 6 April 2010.

ANA officers were commissioned from three sources. These included the Mujahideen Integration Course (MIC), the National Military Academy of Afghanistan (NMAA), and the Officer Candidate (or Cadet) School (OCS). The French-run MIC was considered a temporary measure to fill mid-level officer positions until other sources could produce enough graduates. It was for former mujahideen or militia commanders that were already commissioned and had experience, though they had low levels of literacy and education. The eight-week continuing education program of the MIC had a high graduation rate, but its training was considered to be inadequate, and it was cancelled in 2012. The British-run OCS was a 23-week course designed to fill the junior officer ranks with candidates who were university graduates. Officer selection was difficult because of low education levels, even among university graduates that began OCS.

The four-year NMAA was modeled after the United States Military Academy at West Point and was intended to create a highly educated officer corps. The academy awarded its graduates a university degree in engineering along with a commission as a second lieutenant. NMAA cadets, who were between the ages 18 to 23, specialized in civil, mechanical, systems or electrical engineering, as an effort to facilitate the reconstruction of Afghanistan. They had a 10-year service obligation after graduation. The academy had a close relationship with West Point, whose corps of cadets became partnered with the Afghan corps of cadets. The NMAA made sure that applicants who were not selected were given the opportunity to apply to other army commissioning or NCO programs, or to the Afghan National Police.

The ANA received the majority of its officers from OCS. The Afghan Command and General Staff College, opened in 2006, prepared mid-level officers to serve on brigade and corps staffs. It was reported in 2016 that the Afghan National Army had close to 1,000 officers with the rank of general, more than the number of generals in the United States Army.

=== Enlisted ===
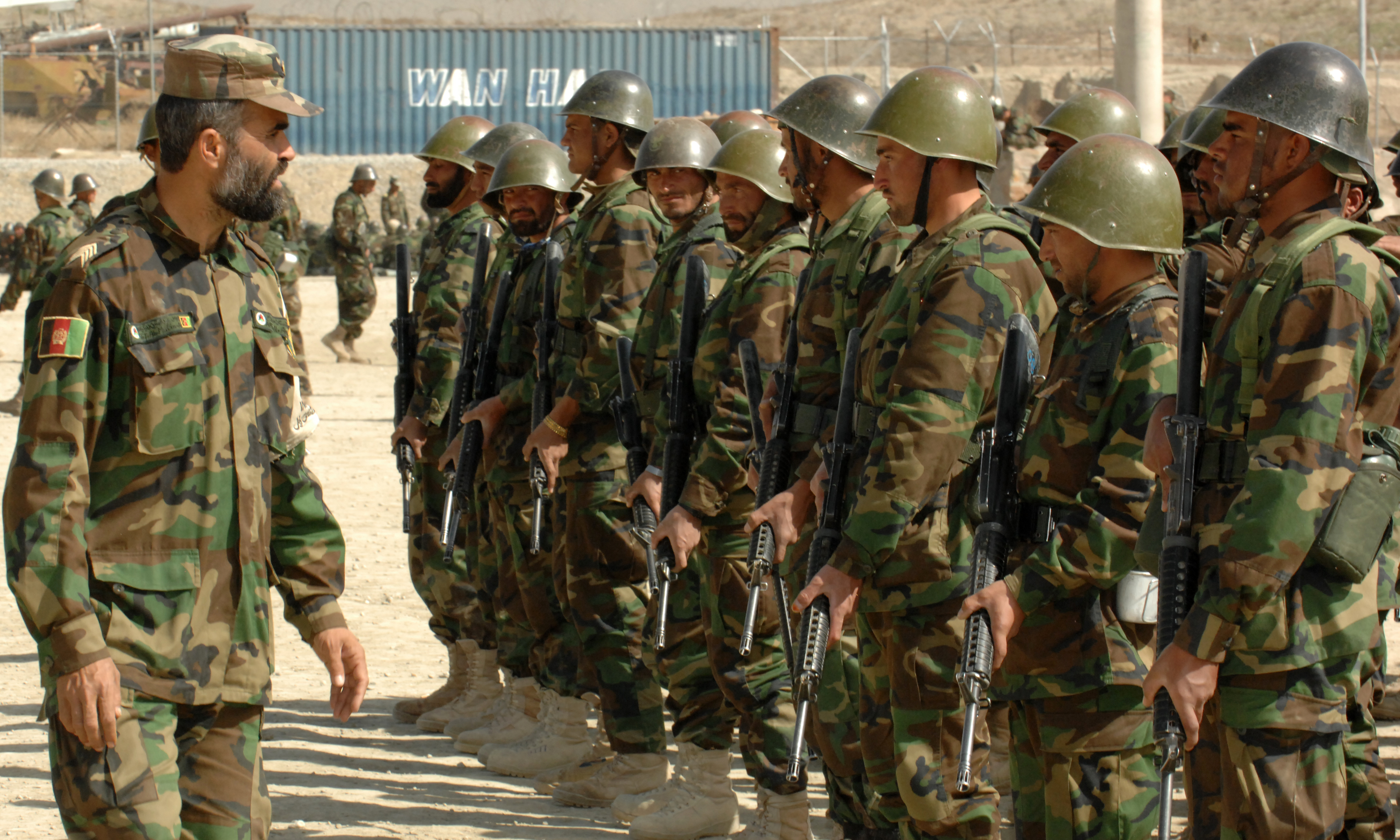
An Afghan instructor speaking to recruits at the Kabul Military Training Center, on 15 March 2010.

After being processed at a recruiting station, ANA enlisted soldiers underwent a one-week orientation in Kabul (or at a regional training center), before being assigned to a kandak and going through seven weeks of Basic Warrior Training (BWT), overseen by Afghan instructors and US advisors. In addition to basic infantry skills, the course attempted to encourage cooperation among soldiers of different ethnic groups. Recruits that were found to have leadership potential were reassigned during the first week to the British-run NCO Academy. After BWT recruits went on to advanced infantry training, a specialty branch school, or were assigned to a unit. New NCOs were assigned as section leaders in the next kandak. The Bridmal ("battle buddy" in Pashto) NCO Academy intended develop leadership skills among Afghan NCOs. It included courses in leadership, management and organizational skills, as well as battle staff and drill instructor courses.

When a kandak completed its training, it was joined by officers and underwent field exercises at the Consolidated Training Center, during which it performed various tasks that built unit cohesion. The Consolidated Training Center in Kabul fully equipped the troops, gave officers additional training, and put the kandak through a final exercise, after which it was given a "capability milestone" rating. These ranged from CM-1, fully capable of conducting its missions, to CM-4, partially capable of conducting some missions and requiring international assistance. The kandak then was then assigned to a regional corps, where it went through another 60 days of individual and battalion training in its corps area before entering combat operations.

== Structure ==
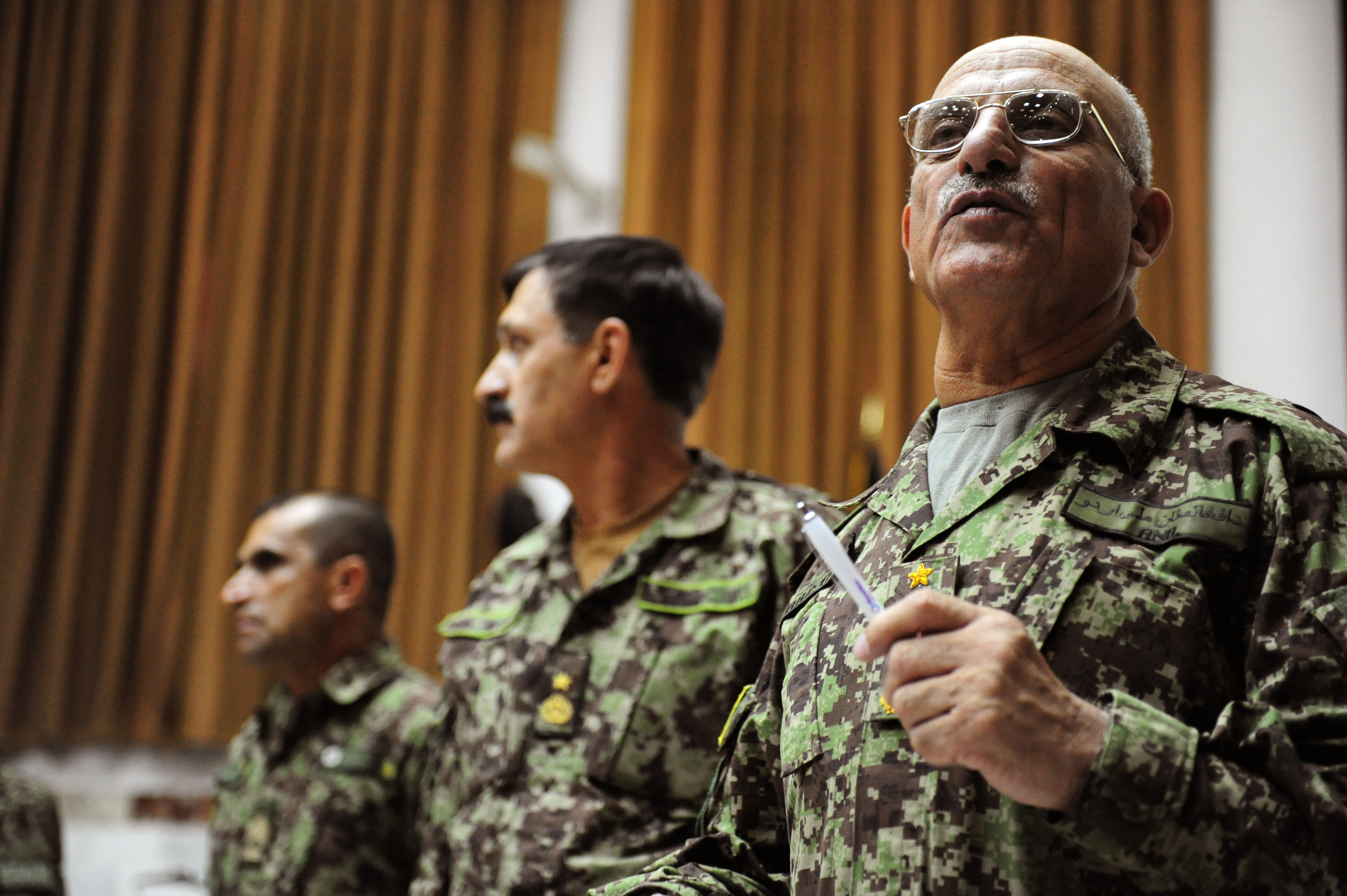
Gen. Sher Mohammad Karimi, ANA Chief of the General Staff, with the Kabul Military Training Center commander and the Sergeant Major of the ANA, 11 July 2011.

The Ministry of Defence in Kabul oversaw the Afghan National Army, and the General Staff was responsible for its operations, led by the Chief of the General Staff, who answered to the defense minister. The ANA General Staff, responsible for commanding Afghanistan's ground and air forces, as of 2020 oversaw the conventional ground forces, the Special Operations Command (ANASOC), the Afghan Air Force (AAF), the Afghan National Civil Order Force (ANCOF), the Afghan Border Force (ABF), and the Afghan Territorial Force (ANA-TF). The General Staff worked directly with regional corps commanders to execute campaigns. By 2020, a National Military Coordination Center in Kabul aimed to provide coordination for operations and manage the distribution of ANA assets based on strategic guidance from the Ministry of Defense.

The NMCC was in contact with five regional and 34 provincial Operational Coordination Centers, which coordinated all ANA, ANP, and ISAF activities in a given area, and answered to provincial brigade or regional corps headquarters. The OCCs enabled the Afghan security forces to monitor and coordinate security, determine a response to emergencies, and provide command and control for deployed forces, while remaining in contact with the National Military and National Police Coordination Centers.

=== Ground Forces ===
The largest ANA elements were the regional corps, which were typically composed of a headquarters battalion (kandak), three to four infantry brigades, and various specialized battalions. The region of each corps followed provincial borders, and the main task of the corps was to provide security for population centers, lines of communication, and key terrain. Because the ANA was an infantry-centric force, each corps mainly consisted of infantry brigades. The standard structure of an ANA infantry brigade consisted of three to four infantry battalions, a combat support battalion, and a combat service support battalion. For some missions the infantry battalions were replaced by Commando battalions. The 111th Capital Division in Kabul existed independently of any corps.

The Ground Forces Command briefly existed to oversee the regional corps and the capital division. It was led by a lieutenant general of the ANA and modeled on the ISAF Joint Command. At some point the General Staff was restored in its role in command of the ground forces. As of 2020, there were 27 combat brigades.

Afghan National Army Ground Forces
Source unless otherwise indicated:
- General Staff (or briefly the Ground Forces Command), Kabul
  - 111th Capital Division, Kabul and surrounding districts
    - 1st Brigade (Darulaman)
    - 2nd Brigade (Pol-e-charkhi)
    - 3rd Quick Reaction Force Brigade (Surobi District, Kabul)
  - 201st Corps, Gamberi
    - Corps Logistics Support Battalion
    - Corps Combat Support Battalion
    - 201st Route Clearing Company
    - 1st Brigade (Gamberi)
    - 2nd Brigade (Khas Kunar District)
    - 3rd Brigade (Surobi District, Paktika)
  - 203rd Corps, Gardez
    - Corps Combat Support Battalion
    - 203rd Route Clearing Company
    - Military Police Company
    - 1st Brigade (Khost)
    - 2nd Brigade (Sharana)
    - 3rd Brigade (Ghazni)
    - 4th Brigade (Forward Operating Base Shank)
  - 205th Corps, Kandahar
    - 2nd Forward Supply Depot
    - 205th Route Clearing Company
    - 1st Brigade (Kandahar)
    - 2nd Brigade (Qalat)
    - 3rd Brigade (Zhari)
    - 4th Brigade (Camp Holland)
  - 207th Corps, Herat
    - 207th Route Clearing Company
    - 1st Brigade (Herat)
    - 2nd Brigade (Farah)
    - 3rd Brigade (Chesma-e-Dozakh)
  - 209th Corps, Mazar-e-Sharif
    - 209th Route Clearing Company
    - 1st Brigade (Meymanah)
    - 2nd Brigade (Kunduz)
    - 3rd Brigade (Mazar-e-Sharif)
  - 215th Corps, Maiwand
    - 215th Route Clearing Company
    - 1st Brigade (Garmsir)
    - 2nd Brigade (Sangin)
    - 3rd Brigade (Lashkar Gah)
    - 4th Brigade (Forward Operating Base Delaram)
  - 217th Corps
- Special Operations Command, Camp Morehead
  - 1st Special Operations Brigade
  - 2nd Special Operations Brigade
  - 3rd Special Operations Brigade
  - 4th Special Operations Brigade
  - National Mission Brigade
- Support Command
  - 6 Corps Forward Supply Depots
  - Central Movement Agency
  - Central Maintenance Workshop
- Recruiting Command
  - 34 National Afghan Army Volunteer Centers
- Training Command
  - Kabul Military Training Center
  - 6 Regional Military Training Centers
  - National Military Academy of Afghanistan
    - Bridmal NCO Academy
    - Command and Staff College
  - Marshal Fahim National Defense University
  - 12 Branch Schools
  - Commando Training Center
  - Consolidated Training Center
- Detention Facility

=== Air Force ===
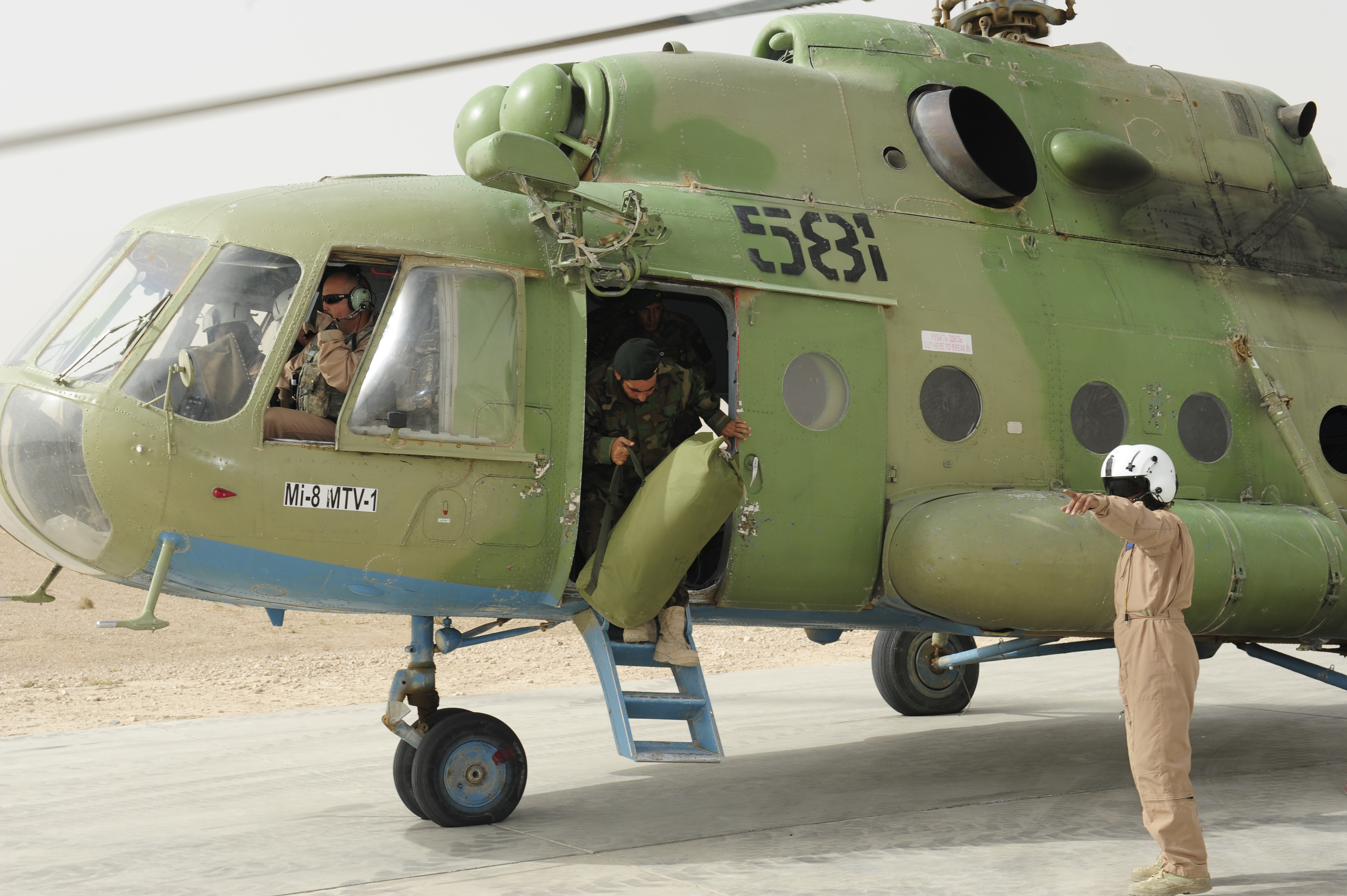
The AAF was centered on a fleet of Mil Mi-17 helicopters.

The Afghan Air Force was re-established in 2006 as the Afghan National Army Air Corps before being renamed in 2010 while remaining part of the ANA. Instead of being a corps, it became a complementary organization under the ANA Chief of the General Staff. Initially, a few US Army aviators based in Kabul provided informal training on Mil Mi-17 helicopters to Afghan pilots. Based on his work, in early 2007 the Combined Air Power Transition Force–Afghanistan was founded to build an air corps within the ANA. In 2009, the first Afghan pilots began training in the United States. As of early 2011, Eastern European ISAF pilots who could speak in Russian to the older Soviet-educated Afghan pilots were providing them with training on the Mi-17.

The Afghan Air Force was relatively capable before and during the 1980s but by late 2001, the number of operational aircraft available was minimal. The United States and its allies quickly eliminated the remaining strength and ability of the Taliban to operate aircraft in the opening stages of the United States invasion of Afghanistan. With the occupation of airbases by American forces it became clear how destitute the Air Force had become since the withdrawal of the Soviet Union. Most aircraft were only remnants rusting away for a decade or more. Many others were relocated to neighboring countries for storage purposes or sold cheaply. The AAF was reduced to a very small force while the country was torn by civil war. It was gradually strengthened by CSTC-A's NATO-led multinational Combined Air Power Transition Force.

The Afghan Air Force had over 200 refurbished aircraft, which includes A-29 Super Tucano attack aircraft, Lockheed C-130 Hercules and Pilatus PC-12s military transport aircraft, as well as UH-60A Black Hawk, Mil Mi-17, Mi-24, and other types of helicopters. It also included trainers such as Aero L-39 Albatros and Cessna 182. The manpower of the Afghan Air Force was around 7,000, which includes over 450 pilots. It also had a small number of female pilots.

The AAF was centered on Russian-made Mi-17 transport helicopters. It did not receive all of its aircraft until 2017. There were military airfields in Kabul, Gardez, Jalabad, Herat and Kandahar. The AAF depended on foreign contractors for maintenance of most of its aircraft, except for the Mi-17s, which Afghan technicians were capable of providing routine maintenance for. As of 2020, the AAF consisted of three combat wings and 18 detachments that provided aerial fires and lift support for the ANA ground forces.

The Afghan National Army Air Corps, c. 2009 (source):

- Kabul Wing, supporting the 201st Corps and the capital division
- Kandahar Wing, supporting the 205th Corps
- Gardez Regional Support Squadron, supporting the 203rd Corps
- Herat Regional Support Squadron, supporting the 207th Corps
- Mazar-e-Sharif Regional Support Squadron, supporting the 209th Corps
- VIP Transport Detachment, Kabul

=== Territorial Force ===
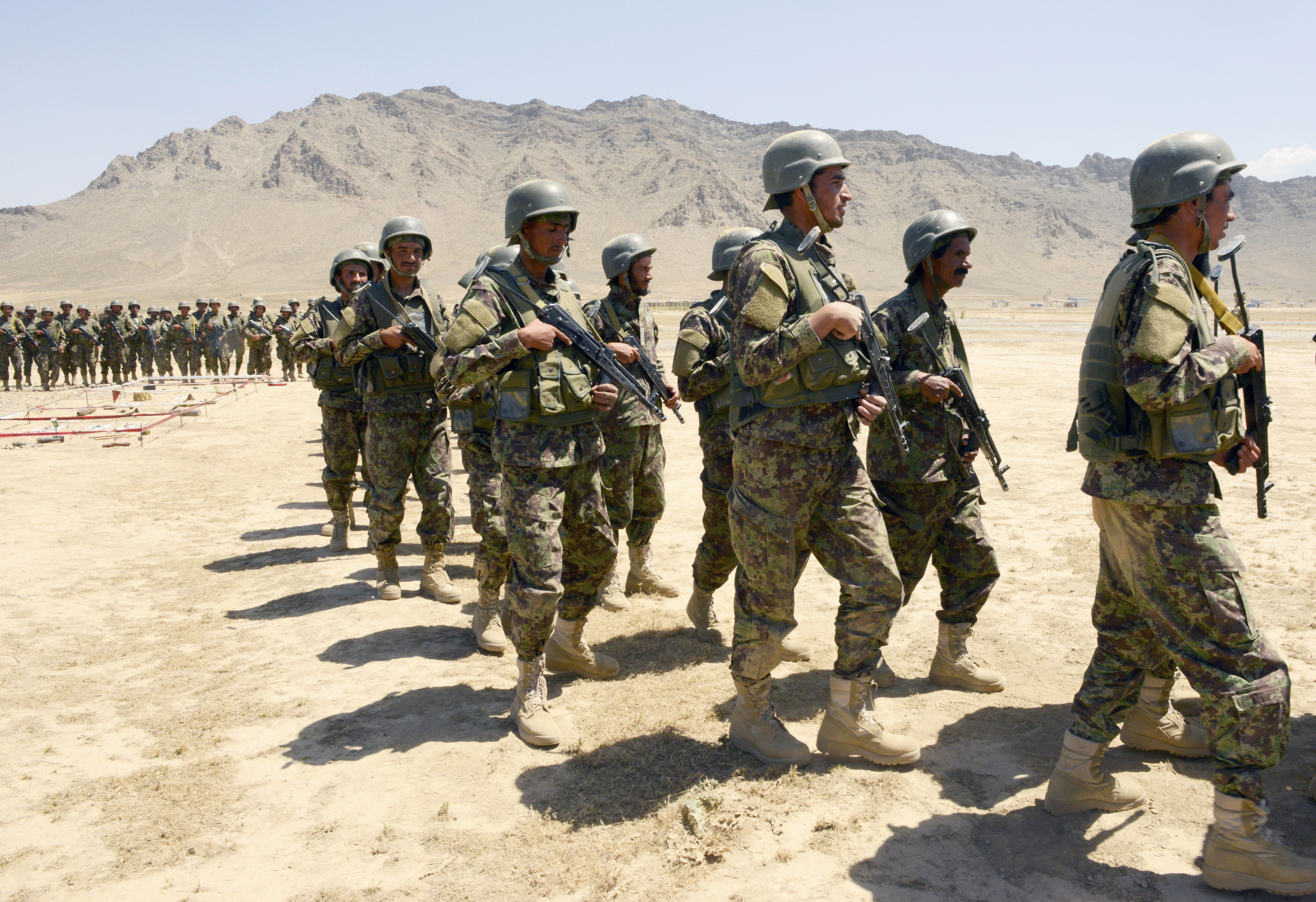
Soldiers of the Territorial Force at the Kabul Military Training Center, 2018.

The ANA Territorial Force (ANA-TF) was created on 4 February 2018. It was the result of months of planning by the Afghan Ministry of Defense and the NATO Resolute Support Mission after Ghani proposed the idea to Gen. John Nicholson in July 2017, inspired by the Indian Territorial Army. The goal behind the creation of the ANA-TF was to provide local defense at the district level or lower using forces that receive regular training but have much lighter equipment than a standard ANA unit, making them logistically easier to sustain. The basic tactical unit of the Territorial Force was a tolay (company) of 134 men. Regular ANA battalions and brigades had operational and administrative control over Territorial Force companies, which only operated in their home district. The intention was to use the ANA-TF to hold territory in districts that were secured by the regular military while using limited resources. As of mid-2020, there were 83 operational companies in the Territorial Force.

=== Border Force and Civil Order Force ===
The ABF and ANCOF originated from the Border Police and the Civil Order Police under the Ministry of Interior, before they were transferred to the ANA and the Ministry of Defense in 2017 and 2018, respectively. Both forces were organized into several brigades that were under the command of ANA regional corps. The Border Force provided security along Afghanistan's borders and up to 30 miles into the country. The Civil Order Force dealt with civil unrest and provided security in cities and urban areas.

=== Special Operations Command ===
ANASOC was a corps-level command that conducted short-term special operations that were too complex for ANA regular units. It consisted of ten commando or special operations kandaks (SOKs, the primary tactical unit of ANASOC); six mobile strike kandaks (MSKs); two cobra strike kandaks (CSKs); and seven support elements. The MSKs and CSKs provided mechanized infantry capability. ANASOC also included Special Forces kandaks and Ktah-Khas (KKA) companies. These units were spread between four regional Special Operations Brigades and the National Mission Brigade in Kabul. The latter provided the president of Afghanistan and the Ministry of Defense with a rapid response capability for emergency situations across the country. The Air Force's Special Mission Wing (SMW) provided intelligence, surveillance and reconnaissance; and strike support to the National Mission Brigade.

== Bases and facilities in the late 2010s ==
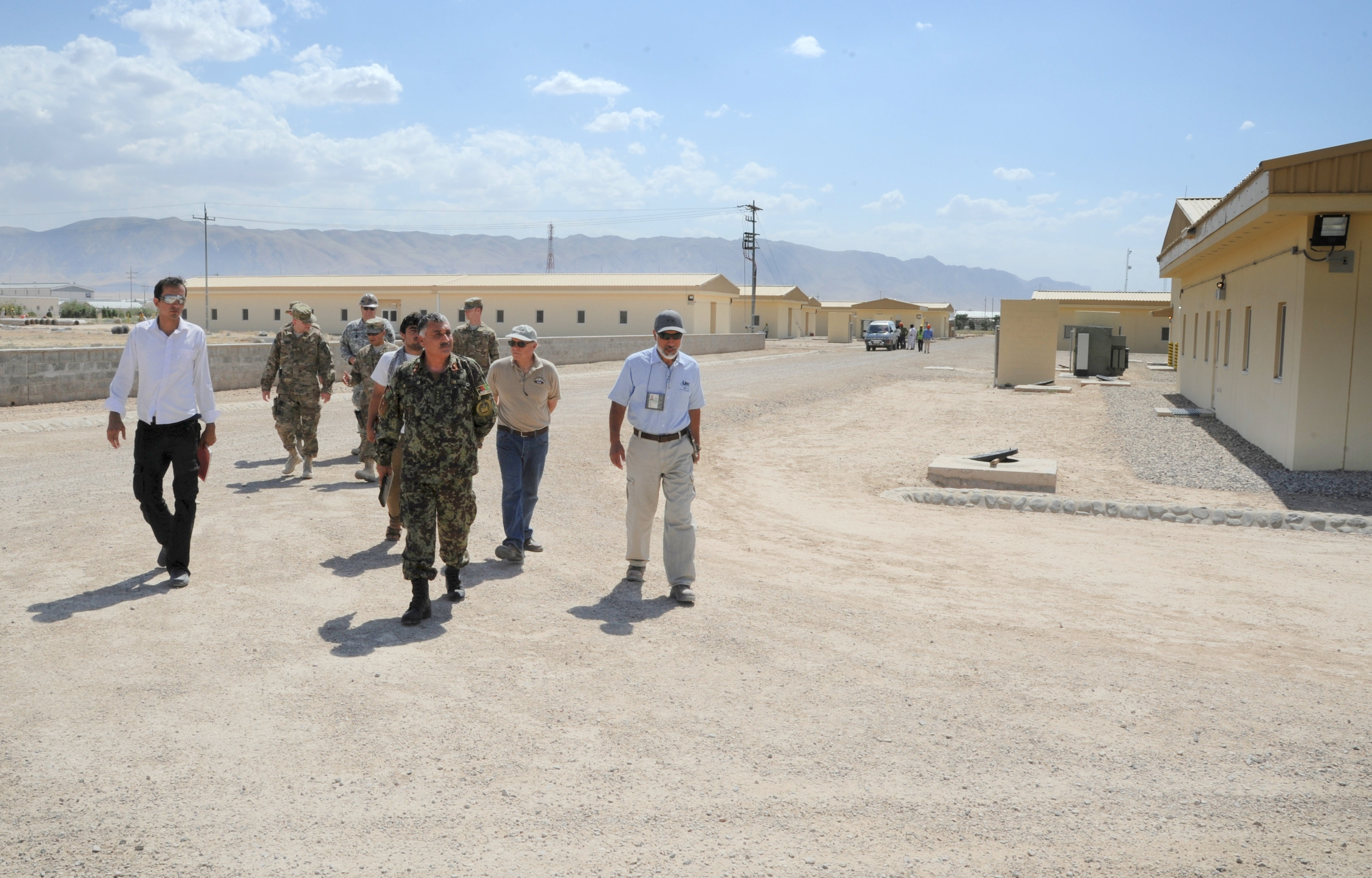
Inside Camp Shaheen in Balkh province (2009)

Large numbers of military bases were found across the country, including major ones in the provinces of Balkh, Farah, Ghazni, Herat, Kabul, Kandahar, Khost, Maidan Wardak, Nangarhar, Paktia, Paktika and Parwan. Some of these were built by the United States Army Corps of Engineers (USACE) while others by ISAF and Afghans. It was reported in 2010 that there were at least 700 military bases and outposts in Afghanistan. About 400 of them were used by ISAF forces with the remaining 300 or so by Afghan National Security Forces.

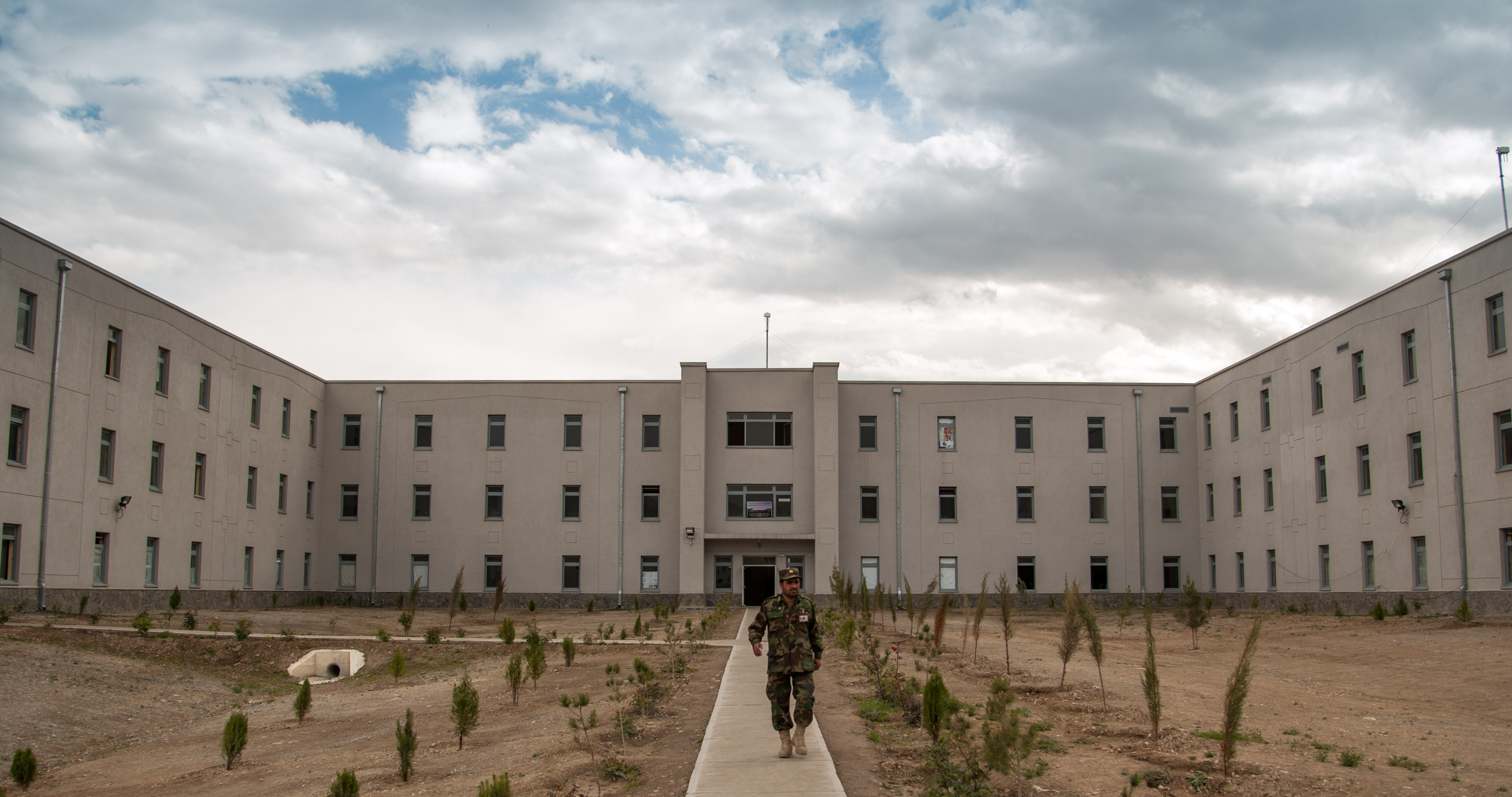
Marshal Fahim National Defense University

The National Military Academy of Afghanistan was built to educate officers, modeled after the United States Military Academy. The Marshal Fahim National Defense University was located in Kabul province and consists of a headquarters building, classrooms, dining facility, library, and medical clinic. In addition to this, an $80 million central command center was built next to the Hamid Karzai International Airport. The National Military Command Center was mentored by Virginia Army National Guard soldiers.

Sizable numbers of Afghan officers were trained in India, either at the Indian Military Academy in Dehradun, the National Defence Academy near Pune or the Officers Training Academy in Chennai. The Officers Training Academy on the other hand provided a 49-week course to graduate officer candidates. The Indian Military Academy provided a four-year degree to army officers, while the National Defence Academy provided a three-year degree after which officers undergo a one-year specialization in their respective service colleges. In 2014 the number of Afghan officers in training in India was nearly 1,100.

== Ineffectiveness ==
The ANA was noted to have rampant corruption, poor leadership, high attrition, many "ghost soldiers," and poor sustainment, maintenance, and logistical capabilities. The ANA's "pull" logistical system was dysfunctional. American trainers often spent much time verifying that Afghan rosters were accurate — that they were not padded with "ghosts" being "paid" by Afghan commanders who stole the wages. Its central command was slow to respond to the logistical needs of kandaks deployed in the field. Battalion logistics officers were unable to have their requests for supplies met. Corruption among Afghan senior officers was widespread enough to be a significant problem, because they siphoned off army supplies for themselves or their allies. As much as two-thirds of the fuel that the ANA had was being siphoned off. There were also instances of officers selling supplies to the Taliban. US trainers reported missing vehicles, weapons and other military equipment, and outright theft of fuel. Death threats were leveled against US officers who tried to stop Afghan soldiers from stealing. Afghan soldiers often snipped the command wires of IEDs instead of marking them and waiting for US forces to come to detonate them. This allowed insurgents to return and reconnect them. Another factor for the collapse of ANA logistics was the withdrawal of US contractors. Low literacy and education levels were another problem. Even some Commando recruits were unable to read or do basic addition or multiplication.

The Taliban was also perceived by some Afghans as being more connected to Afghan identity, including to Islam and resisting foreign occupation, than the government military was. Every ANA kandak had a religious affairs officer who was a trained mullah, knowledgeable in the Quran, and also doubled as a political officer that organized and spoke to shuras of local elders. Despite this, the government struggled to inspire its soldiers to fight, and did not have a guiding ideology. Only a few pro-government tribes or units were capable of holding ground with limited support as the Taliban did, most notably the ANA Commandos. By 2017, the government became reliant on ANA special operations forces and the air force to conduct the majority of missions. Commandos were recruited from among the most motivated and fit Afghan soldiers, and were trained to a high standard by US special operations forces. As a result, the Commandos had more professionalism and pride than the regular army, and more determination to fight.

The regular ANA had low cohesion and was largely apathetic. Desertion was a major problem, and in addition to that, soldiers frequently returned to their hometowns during the Islamic holy month of Ramadan, and during the winter, when living conditions worsened. The fact that Afghan soldiers served alongside US and other non-Muslim troops became a source of tension. An incident of US personnel burning Qurans in February 2012 caused an increase of "insider attacks" on foreign troops by ANA soldiers. Though some commanders took strong measures to prevent such attacks, the Afghan government never made a systemic effort to do so.

The Afghan Ministry of Defense objected to having a smaller and all-volunteer army. Compared to other countries with US-backed governments, Iraq and South Vietnam, Afghanistan had the lowest ratio of security forces personnel compared to the size of its territory and its population. The Army of the Republic of Vietnam had been 8.5 times the size of the ANA (as of 2015), for a country one-fourth the size of Afghanistan. The Iraqi Army was twice the size of the ANA. There was a lack of coordination between the ANA under the Ministry of Defense, the police forces under the Ministry of Interior, and the Directorate of National Security. Local irregular forces were under the Ministry of Interior (as the Afghan Local Police) instead of the Ministry of Defense, which undermined cooperation between them and the ANA. Because of the difficulties in cooperating, the police sometimes had to do work that was more suitable for the ANA.

=== Green-on-blue attacks ===
"Green-on-blue" or "insider attacks," in which Afghan soldiers or police officers turned their weapons on American, European or Australian counterparts, became a major concern in 2010 and peaked in 2012—when they accounted for nearly 25% of ISAF casualties—before declining during 2013–2014 as international forces withdrew from the conflict.

The scale of the insider attacks shocked CIA analysts, who could find no similar phenomenon during the Vietnam War, the Soviet–Afghan War, or any other counter-insurgency in modern history. The attacks accelerated during the Muslim holy month of Ramadan (which did not correlate with increased frequency of other kinds of militant activity in 2012) and a "copycat pattern" marked by an elevated risk of follow-up attacks within two days of the original incident was observed, but the underlying causes of this violence were debated. One theory—based on a 2011 study conducted by research psychologist Major Jeffrey T. Bordin, who interviewed Afghan and American troops regarding their perceptions of each other—posited that the insider attacks were the result of cultural incompatibility and resentment. However, a 2013 study by forensic psychiatrist Marc Sageman, a former CIA officer and academic, based on the US military's "15–6" case files and other documentary evidence, found zero insider attacks during 2012 that escalated directly from a feud or cultural misunderstanding between two officers who worked together.

While approximately 10% of the cases were linked to high-profile provocations such as the 2012 Afghanistan Quran burning protests and the Kandahar massacre, Joint Worldwide Intelligence Communications System intercepts showed that 56% of inside attackers interacted with the Taliban before deciding to strike, and there was circumstantial evidence of Taliban contact in a further 19% of cases. According to Sageman, the attackers were not Taliban cadres sent to infiltrate the Afghan army, but rather defectors who were persuaded to kill their erstwhile allies on their way out; to the extent that they were motivated by grievances, these were collective affronts to "Afghans" or "Muslims" as such, not personal slights, and their retaliatory violence was often indiscriminate, following the profile of a mass shooter. To reduce "green-on-blue" violence, ISAF soldiers were reminded to "respect Islam" and "avoid arrogance," armed guards were deployed as "guardian angels" to watch over joint exercises, and counterintelligence surveillance of previously vetted Afghan troops was expanded, among other preventative measures.

=== Human right abuses ===
According to American journalist Annie Jacobsen, most Afghan fighters being trained by the US habitually used opium, and it was a constant struggle to field them in a sober state. The same book claimed that rape of Afghan recruits by other Afghan soldiers occurred in US-run military facilities, undermining combat readiness. Jacobsen wrote that a 2018 report by a US inspector general noted 5,753 cases of "gross human rights abuses by Afghan forces", including "routine enslavement and rape of underage boys by Afghan commanders" Partly this reporting is referring to aggravated LGBT Bacha bazi type practices, which are centuries old.

According to a 2017 report by the Special Inspector General for Afghanistan Reconstruction (SIGAR), between of 2010 and 2016, the Department of Defense made 5,753 Leahy Law vetting requests for Afghan security forces. The Leahy law prohibits U.S. funding of foreign security units if there are credible reports of gross violation of human rights. According to SIGAR, between 2010 and 2016, 75 allegations of gross violations of human rights by Afghan security forces, including murder and 16 cases of child sexual assault were reported to the Department of Defense. Around a dozen Afghan units accused of abuses continued to receive U.S. funding due to an exception in the law allowing funding to continue if units are deemed to be important for "national security concern."

== Military equipment ==
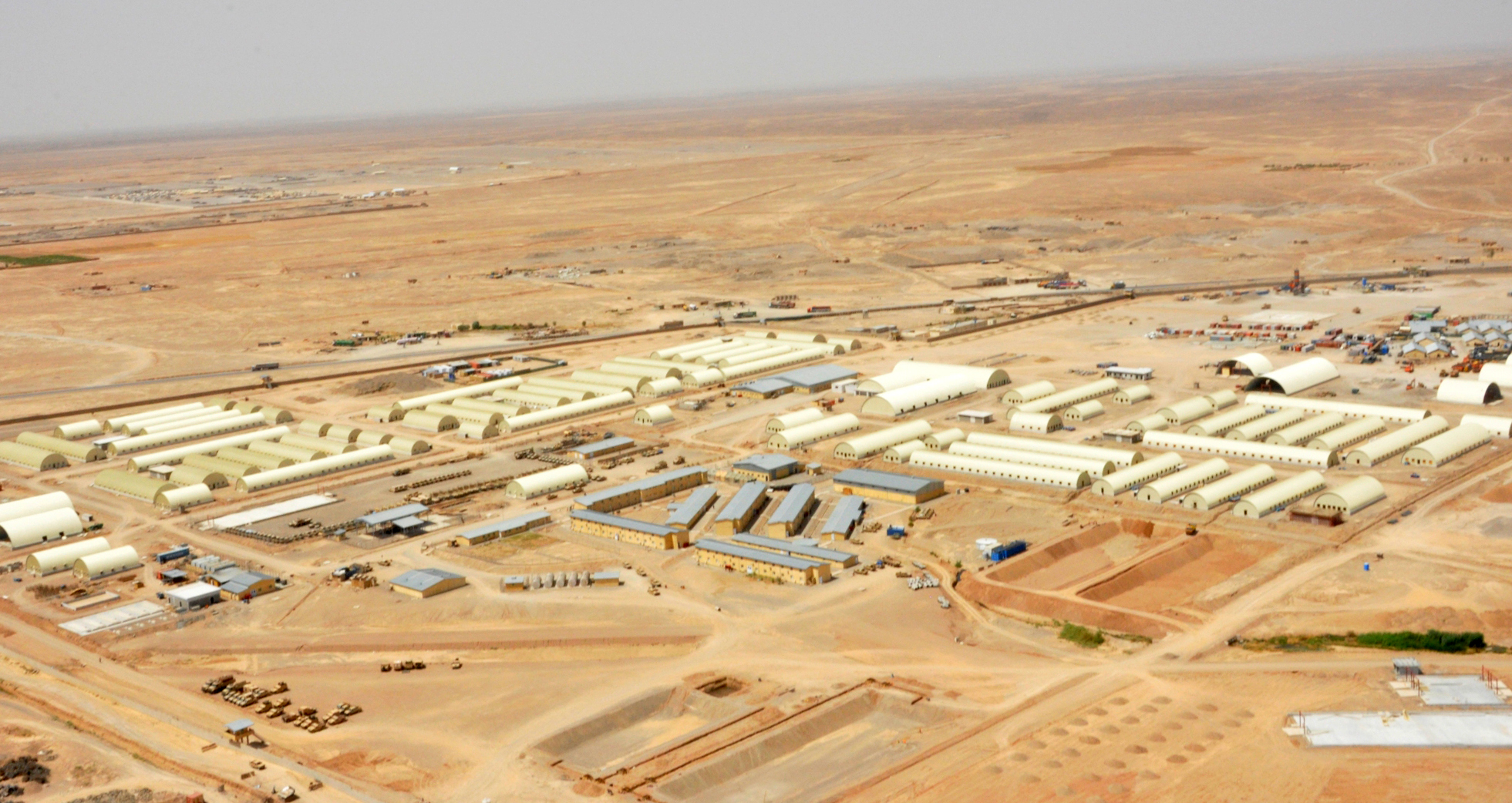
Construction of army base underway in Kandahar province.

The United States provided billions of dollars in military aid. One package included 2,500 Humvees, tens of thousands of M16 assault rifles and body armoured-jackets. It also included the building of a national military command center as well as training compounds in several provinces of the country. The Canadian Forces supplied some surplus Canadian-made Colt Canada C7 rifles but the Afghans returned the C7 in favor of the American-made M16 rifle, because the parts of the two rifles, despite being similar, were not fully interchangeable.

Besides the United States and its allies/partners, Afghanistan increasingly turned to India and Russia for assistance. Both countries had supported the Northern Alliance, with funding, training, supplies and medical treatment of wounded fighters, against the Taliban prior to 2002. India had been reluctant to provide military aid due to fears of antagonizing its regional rival Pakistan. In 2013, after years of subtle reminders, the Afghan government sent a wish list of heavy weapons to India.The list includes as many as 150 T-72 battle tanks, 120 (105 mm) field guns, a large number of 82 mm mortars, one Antonov An-32 medium lift transport aircraft, two squadrons of Mil Mi-17 medium lift and Mi-35 attack helicopters, and a large number of trucks. In 2014, India signed a deal with Russia and Afghanistan where it would pay Russia for all the heavy equipment requested by Afghanistan instead of directly supplying them. The deal also includes the refurbishment of heavy weapons left behind since the Soviet war.

The military budget reached $12 billion USD by 2011, mostly provided by aid. From 2001–2021, the United States spent an estimated $83 billion on the Afghan armed forces through the Afghanistan Security Forces Fund and an additional $36 billion to support the Afghan government.

Other state suppliers included Brazil; China; France; Germany; Italy; Pakistan; Turkey; the United Kingdom; and Uzbekistan.

As the size of the Armed Forces grew, so did the need for aircraft and vehicles. It was announced in 2011 that the Afghan Armed Forces would be provided with 145 aircraft, 21 helicopters and 23,000 vehicles. In 2012, Afghanistan became a major non-NATO ally of the United States. This meant the country was able to purchase and receive weapons from the United States without restrictions. In the meantime, the Afghan Air Force began seeking fighter aircraft and other advanced weapons. Defense Minister Wardak explained that "what we are asking to acquire is just the ability to defend ourselves, and also to be relevant in the future so that our friends and allies can count on us to participate in peacekeeping and other operations of mutual interest."

Whatever foreign advisors perceived as the right equipment mix, Afghans wanted main battle tanks, more artillery, other heavy weapons, as well as fighter and ground attack aircraft, plus attack helicopters. Donors' protests that equipment serviceability rates were dire, and such forces implausible, did not stop the requests coming.

== Senior officers circa 2019 ==
Minister of Defense 15 September 2012 – 24 May 2015 Bismillah Khan Mohammadi stands with the Afghan National Army senior noncommissioned officer corps at the 9th annual Sergeant Major of the Army seminar held at the Kabul Military Training Center

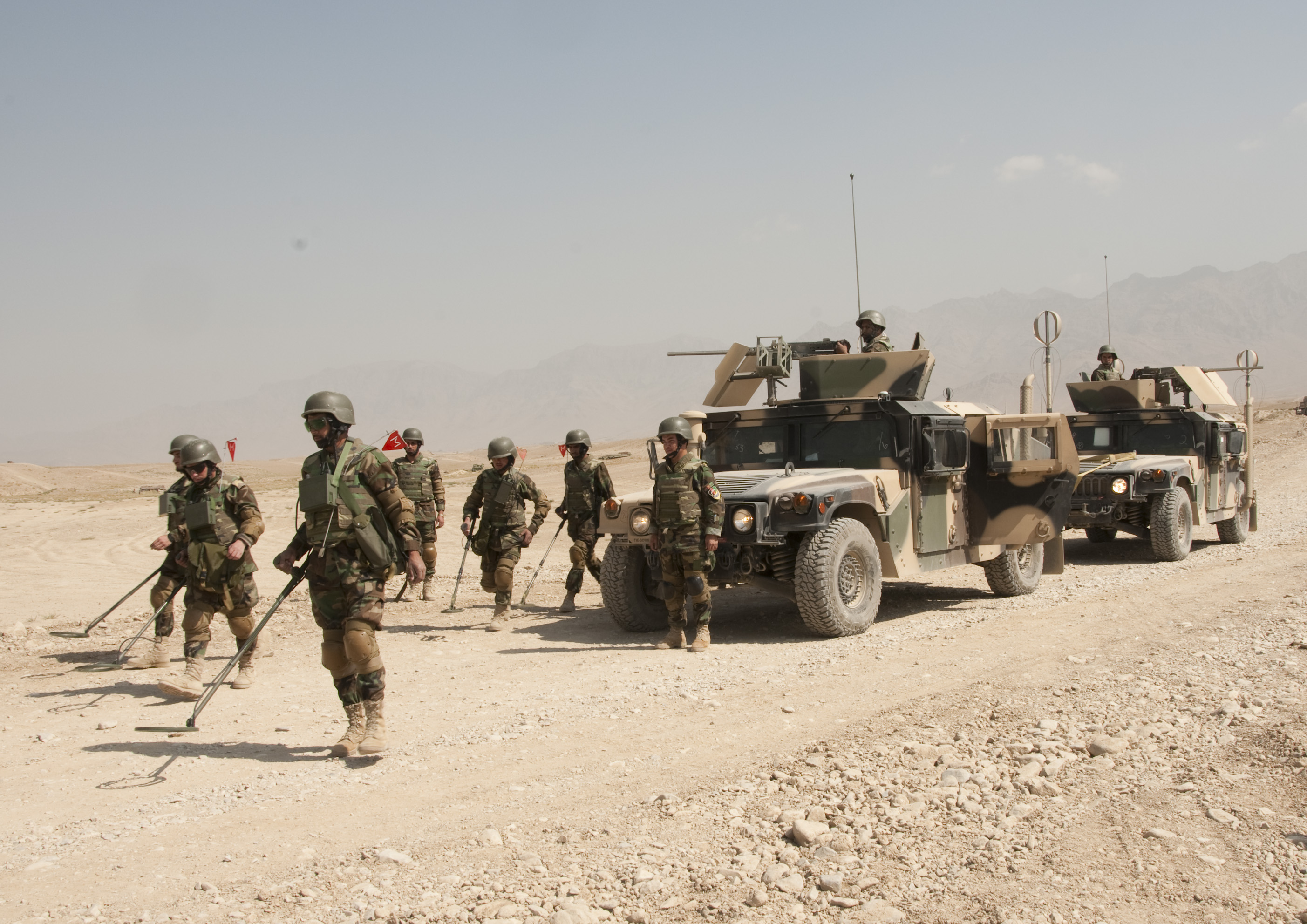
Soldiers training on how to clear improvised explosive devices on roads

- Defence Minister, General Bismillah Khan Mohammadi (acting)
- Defense Ministry Spokesman, Major General Dawlat Waziri
- Chief of General Staff, Lieutenant General Murad Ali Murad
- Vice Chief of the General Staff (VCoGS), Lieutenant General Yasin Zia
- Deputy Chief of the General Staff (DoGS), Lieutenant General Mohammad Ikram
- Afghan Air Force Commander, Lieutenant General Mohammad Dawran
- Command Sergeant Major of the ANA, Sergeant Major Roshan Safi
- General Staff Chief of Personnel (GSG1), Lieutenant General Murad Ali Murad
- General Staff Chief of Intelligence (GSG2), Major General Abdul Khaliq Faryad
- General Staff Chief of Operations (GSG3), Major General Afzal Aman
- General Staff Chief of Logistics (GSG4), Lieutenant General Azizuddin Farahee
- General Staff Chief of Plans (GSG5), Major General Jan Kahn
- General Staff Chief of Communications (GSG6), Major General Mehrab Ali
- General Staff Chief of Doctrine & Training (GSG7), Major General Kushiwal
- General Staff Chief of Engineering (GSEng), Major General Muslim Amid
- General Staff Inspector General, Major General Jalandar Shah
- Surgeon General, Lieutenant General Dr. Abdul Qayum Tutakhail
- 201st Selab ("Flood") Corps Commander, Major General Mohammad Rahim Wardak
- 203rd Tandar ("Thunder") Corps Commander, Major General Abdul Khaleq
- 205th Atal ("Hero") Corps Commander, Major General Sher Mohammad Zazai
- 207th Zafar ("Victory") Corps Commander, Major General Jalandar Shah Behnam
- 209th Shaheen ("Falcon") Corps Commander, Major General Murad Ali
- 215th Maiwand Corps Commander, Major Gen. Sayed Malouk
- Afghan National Army Training Command, Major General Aminullah Karim
- ANA Special Operations Command
- ANA Recruiting Command, Lieutenant General Mohammad Eshaq Noori
- Headquarters Security and Support Brigade, Brigadier General Sadiq
- Command and General Staff College, Major General Rizak
- National Military Academy of Afghanistan, Major General Mohammad Sharef
- Kabul Military Training Centre, Brigadier General Mohammad Amin Wardak

== See also ==
- Military history of Afghanistan
- Soviet–Afghan War
- List of Afghan security forces fatality reports in Afghanistan

== Sources ==
Articles and reports

- Amtstutz, J. Bruce (1986). Afghanistan: The First Five Years of Soviet Occupation (PDF). Washington, DC.: National Defense University. Archived (PDF) from the original on 2015-02-08.
- International Crisis Group (2002). The Afghan Transitional Administration: Prospects and Perils. ICG Afghanistan Briefing Paper (Report). JSTOR resrep46158.
- International Crisis Group (2003b). "Disarmament and Reintegration in Afghanistan". ICG Asia Report (65). JSTOR resrep45997.
- International Crisis Group (2005). "Afghanistan: Getting Disarmament Back on Track". Crisis Group Asia Briefing (35). JSTOR resrep43772.
- International Crisis Group (2010). "A Force in Fragments: Reconstituting the Afghan National Army". Crisis Group Asia Report (153). JSTOR resrep37016.
- International Crisis Group (2017). "Afghanistan: The Future of the National Unity Government". Crisis Group Asia Report (285). JSTOR resrep31778.
- International Institute for Strategic Studies (2010). The Military Balance 2010. London, England: Routledge. ISBN 978-1-85743-557-3.
- Leese, Capt. Robert (14 June 2010). "Afghan National Army Air Corps now Afghan National Army Air Force" (Press release). US Air Force. Archived from the original on 31 August 2021.
- Jalali, Ali A. (2016). "Afghanistan National Defense and Security Forces" (PDF). Washington, DC: United States Institute of Peace. ISBN 978-1-60127-601-8.
- Felker, Craig C. (2021). The Afghan National Army: The Limits of Professionalism. No Moment of Victory: The NATO Training Mission in Afghanistan, 2009–2011 (Report). Air University Press. JSTOR resrep36810.
- Mason, M. Chris (2015). The Strategic Lessons Unlearned From Vietnam, Iraq, and Afghanistan: Why the Afghan National Security Forces Will Not Hold, and the Implications for the U.S. Army in Afghanistan. Strategic Studies Institute, US Army War College (Report). JSTOR resrep12111.
- Mortimer, John J. Jr. (2023). The Afghan Surge: January 2009–August 2011 (PDF). United States Army Center of Military History (Report). 215495-000.
- Neumann, Brian F.; Mundey, Lisa; Mikolashek, Jon (2010). The U.S. Army in Afghanistan: Operation Enduring Freedom, March 2002–April 2005 (PDF). United States Army Center of Military History (Report). 103161–000.
- Neumann, Brian F.; Williams, Colin J. (2020). The U.S. Army in Afghanistan Operation Enduring Freedom, May 2005–January 2009 (PDF). United States Army Center of Military History (Report). 70-131-1.
- United States. Department of Defense (November 2010). Report on Progress Toward Security and Stability in Afghanistan (PDF) (Report). OCLC 769299266.
- United States Department of Defense (2020). Enhancing Security and Stability in Afghanistan (PDF). Report to Congress (Report). E-2BA2571.

Books

- Malkasian, Carter (2021). The American War in Afghanistan: A History. New York, New York: Oxford University Press. ISBN 978-0-19-755077-9.
- Sobchak, Frank K. (2024). Training for Victory: U.S. Special Forces Advisory Operations from El Salvador to Afghanistan. Annapolis, Maryland: Naval Institute Press. ISBN 978-1-68247-133-3.
- Sprague, Stanley B. (2024). Afghanistan's Violent Decades: A History, 1978 Through 2021. Jefferson, North Carolina: McFarland & Company. ISBN 978-1-4766-9185-5.
