= Battle of Tarinkot (2016) =

2016 battle

Coordinates: 32.6242°N 65.8767°E

- Part of the War in Afghanistan (2001–2021)
Date	7–11 September 2016 (4 days)
Location	Tarinkot, Uruzgan, Afghanistan
Result	Afghan government victory

Belligerents
Islamic Republic of Afghanistan: Afghan National Security Forces	Taliban

Commanders and leaders
(Afghanistan) Wais Samim (Uruzgan provincial police chief) (Afghanistan) General Abdul Raziq (Kandahar provincial police chief)	Aminullah Yousaf (Shadow governor of Uruzgan)

Strength
Unknown	Hundreds of insurgents

Casualties and losses
13 policemen killed 20 wounded	~ 100 killed

The Battle of Tarinkot (2016) occurred when the Taliban launched an offensive on the Afghan city of Tarinkot.

== Battle ==
On 7 September 2016, the Taliban attacked Tarinkot. The government forces defending the city, who were low on food and ammunition, managed to halt the offensive. The Taliban did not manage to capture the prison of the city. By the next day, militants had pushed to within hundreds of meters to the police headquarters and the governor's compound. Government officials began evacuating to the Tarinkot Airport. The Taliban then surrounded the city and stated that they had captured more than a dozen government checkpoints. On 9 September, the Afghan Ministry of Defense announced that sporadic fighting was only in the city's northeastern neighborhood and over 80 Taliban militants had been killed in the past 24 hours. The Afghan military was supported by air strikes. Government officials stated on 10 September that the fighters had been pushed back to 15–20 km from the government centers, and the Taliban stated that they shot down a government helicopter, which the government denies. An offensive was launched by the military on the 15th anniversary of 9/11 to clear the outskirts of Tarinkot of militants.
