= Abdul Qayum Tutakhail =

Afghan doctor and military officer (1940-2014)

Abdul Qayum Tutakhail عبدالقیوم طوطاخیل
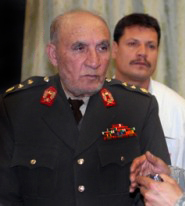
- Abdul Qayum Tutakhail
- Born: March 28, 1940; Paktia, Kingdom of Afghanistan
- Died: December 24, 2014; Kabul, Islamic Republic of Afghanistan
- Military career
- Allegiance: Islamic Republic of Afghanistan
- Branch: Afghan National Army
- Service years: 1967–2014
- Rank: Major General
- Unit: Army Medical Corps
- Commands: Surgeon General
- Conflicts: Siege of Urgun; Battles of Zhawar

Major General عبدالقیوم طوطاخیل (Abdul Qayum Tutakhail or Totakhil) was the Assistant Minister of Defense for Health Affairs in Afghanistan. Prior to this, Tutakhail served as Surgeon General of the Afghan National Army and as a faculty lecturer of AFAMS teaching Combat Surgery, Tactics, Organization and Medical Ethics. From the 1970s General Tutakhail served in the Afghan Military in different capacities. He was an ethnic Pashtun.

== Early life and career ==
Abdul Qayum Tutakhail was born to Khan Mohammad Tutakhail in Sayed-Karam district of Paktia province Afghanistan in 1940. He attended the Harbi Military School in Kabul, and after graduating joined the Kabul Medical University receiving his MD degree. He completed further studies in the former Soviet Union at the Institute of Neurosurgery in Kyiv receiving PhD degree. He specialized in neurosurgery / neurotraumatology with over 3,000 operations under his belt having introduced pioneering medical techniques.

Tutakhail was the author of many research papers such as combat trauma treatment methods, safeguard methods, supply and distribution of medical equipment, principles of injury treatment and trauma during combat.

=== Tutakhail's Postings ===
Military Medical Trainer of Personnel and Cadre	Afghan Ministry of Defense (1967–1971)
Chief of Surgery and Traumatology Department	Military Hospital Number 1/2 (1971–1976)
Chief of Neurosurgery Department	AFAMS (1980–1981)
Head Surgeon	AFAMS (1981–1982)
Head Surgeon of the Army	Afghan Ministry of Defense (1982–1986)
Surgeon General	Afghan Ministry of Defense (1986–1993)
Lecturer at AFAMS	AFAMS (2005–2010)
General Staff Surgeon General	Afghan Ministry of Defense (2010–2012)
Assistant Minister of Defence—Health Affairs	Afghan Ministry of Defense (2012–2014)

By mid-December 2010 when the former Surgeon General Ahmad Zia Yaftali was fired amid accusations of corruption, theft of medicine worth 42 million US dollars destined to Afghan National Security Forces and deadly neglect of injured soldiers and policeman admitted in the Sardar Mohammad Dawood Khan hospital, General Abdul Qayum Tutakhail was reassigned to his previous post to help manage the situation. Since then the hospital has witnessed major improvements and there have not been any documented cases of neglect since February 2011.
