= Ghazni offensive =

Taliban assault on city in Afghanistan

- Part of the War in Afghanistan (2001–2021)
Date	10 August 2018 – 15 August 2018 (5 days)
Location	Ghazni Province, Afghanistan
Result	Taliban insurgents entered Ghazni city and captured five districts of Ghazni Province; Government forces regain control of Ghazni city, but only three districts in Ghazni Province remain under full government control
Territorial changes	Taliban control ten of Ghazni Province's districts, and contest six more

Belligerents
Afghanistan; United States	Taliban

Commanders and leaders
(Islamic Republic of Afghanistan) Ashraf Ghani (President of Afghanistan) (Islamic Republic of Afghanistan) Mohammad Sharif Yaftali (ANA chief of staff) (Islamic Republic of Afghanistan) Brig. Gen. Dadan Lawang (203rd Corps) (United States) Gen. John Nicholson (Commander of Resolute Support Mission)	Hibatullah Akhundzada (Supreme Commander)

Units involved
(Islamic Republic of Afghanistan) Afghan National Security Forces: National Army (ANA); Commando Corps; National Police; United States Armed Forces: Air Force; Army	Several contingents: Foreign insurgents (Pakistanis, Chechens and Arabs acc. to Afghan gov.)

Strength
At least 1,500 (United States) 3 Army Special Operations teams (ODA's)	More than 1,000

Casualties and losses
140–200 killed (in the whole Ghazni province); 2 helicopters shot down; 9 injured; 7 U.S. military armoured vehicles destroyed	500–600 killed (Afghan military claim); 226 killed (US claim)
- 150 civilians killed

The Ghazni offensive began on 10 August 2018, when Taliban fighters launched an assault on the city of Ghazni, Afghanistan's sixth largest city and one which has been culturally and strategically important for much of the country's history. The attack resulted in the deaths of hundreds of insurgents, soldiers, police, and civilians. The city also sustained large-scale property damage. The battle, occurring only weeks before Afghanistan's 2018 parliamentary election, was the largest since a three-day truce in June had raised hopes of peace talks.

The battle was part of a larger coordinated offensive by the Taliban which allowed the Taliban to capture several government bases and districts and killed hundreds of Afghan soldiers and police.

== Background ==
The security situation in Ghazni city and Ghazni Province rapidly deteriorated during 2017 and early 2018. In the months prior to the battle, there were numerous reports of increasing Taliban insurgency activity in the city and in the districts of Ghazni Province. Classic insurgency tactics such as attacks on local government employees, forced taxation of the local population and the setting up of roadblocks by insurgent fighters were all reported. During May and June 2018, the Taliban cut Highway 1 (which links Kabul and Kandahar, Afghanistan's largest cities) and the Taliban forced users of the road to pay a tax in order to use it. Other reports indicated that by May 2018, the Taliban were said to "control the road network into the city ... live openly in one neighborhood, collect taxes, assassinate security personnel and government officials, and enforce its harsh brand of Islamic law." The Taliban were also openly transporting their weapons inside the city. Locals officials believe that the security personnel guarding Ghazni's perimeter granted the Taliban free entry to the city.

== Battle ==
=== Order of battle ===
Afghan government and Allied forces

- Afghan National Army
  - 203rd Corps
  - Commandos
    - 2nd Commando Kandak
  - Special Mission Wing (SMW)
- Afghan National Police
  - 303rd Zone
- United States Army
  - 101st Airborne Division (elements)
  - 4th Infantry Division
    - 1st Stryker Brigade Combat Team
  - Special Forces
    - 1st Special Forces Group
      - Operational Detachment Alpha (ODA) team 1333
      - Operational Detachment Alpha (ODA) team 1212
- United States Air Force
  - Air Force Special Tactics teams
  - Combat Aviation Advisors

=== Battle for Ghazni city ===
The Taliban began a large-scale attack on the city just after mid-night on 10 August 2018. The fighting erupted in seven neighborhoods of Ghazni, including three pockets within 0.5 mi (0.80 km) of the Governor's residence. Zabihullah Mujahid, the Taliban spokesman, stated on Twitter that "hundreds of Mujahedeen entered the city, captured the police headquarters and all six police districts and an important military base, Bala Hesar". Government officials denied that the city was at risk of falling, but they conceded that the insurgents had fought to within 300 yd (270 m) of the Governor's office and police headquarters before being pushed back. During the assault, the Taliban managed to destroy cellphone towers, effectively cutting off communication to the city. They also destroyed a bridge which made it more difficult for the government to send reinforcements.

On 11 August, Afghan Armed Forces reinforcements have arrived in Ghazni but fighting continued with Taliban fighters taking refuge in people's homes. U.S. army special force unit: Operational Detachment Alpha (ODA) team 1333 also arrived in the Ghazni city to save it from the Taliban siege. The Taliban claimed to have taken control of the main prison of the city, releasing everyone inside. Government radio and television were forced off the air because their employees fled, and only Radio Shariat, a Taliban station, continued broadcasting. The Afghan Government and their international allies continued to state that they remained in control of the city despite the fact that the Taliban were still in the city, and had set up checkpoints with a provincial councilman from Ghazni claiming 70 percent of the city was under Taliban control.

The United States Air Force carried out 24 anti-Taliban air strikes between 10 and 12 August. However, after three days of fighting, the Taliban were still reportedly in control of most of the city. Wais Barmak, the country's Minister of Interior, claimed that in one airstrike on 12 August, 50 Taliban soldiers were killed.

On 12 August, a lawmaker from Ghazni said that "only the Governor's office, police headquarters and intelligence agency's compound are in the hands of the Government and Taliban are pushing to take them". The Taliban claimed to have seized the old Ghazni airbase and most parts of the city. A reinforcement convoy of Afghan forces was ambushed as it made its way from neighboring Paktia province to Ghazni. Considering the difficulty of retaking all parts of the city, the United States sent military advisers to aid the Afghan forces. The insurgents also began spreading into districts outside Ghazni city, two of which fell to them overnight, according to reports from local residents and Afghan officials. In Ghazni city, a member of the provincial council stated that "heavy fighting [was] ongoing around the Governor's office, the Police Headquarters and the compound of the intelligence agency". He added that "the reinforcements have not done anything effective, all they have done is establish a base for themselves." Farid Ahmad Mashal, Ghazni's police chief, claimed that "reinforcements, including American troops, were beginning to clear the Taliban from the city". The Government in Kabul and the army continued to insist that they were in full control of Ghazni.

On 13 August, Wais Barmak, Afghanistan's interior minister, said in a press conference on Monday that the Taliban's claims—such as having taken over the Ghazni police headquarters and prisons—were false. He added that Afghan forces had repulsed all attacks from the Taliban and that the city was under the Government's control. Lt. Col. Martin O'Donnell, a spokesman for the U.S. military in Ghazni, said that the city remains under Afghan Government control and that the insurgents do not "pose a threat to its collapse as some have claimed." However, officials and residents of Ghazni described the Government buildings as under constant attack and Taliban fighters as in apparent charge of most neighborhoods throughout the city. The Taliban planted land mines on roads into the city which made it difficult for the government to send forces to it.

On 14 August, it was reported that the Taliban had withdrawn from Ghazni city. By 15 August, civilians were leaving their homes in the city and waiting on breadlines at the city's only two surviving bakeries. Corpses, which had been left in the streets for days, were being disposed of by dumping them in the local river, potentially worsening the already serious health crisis in the city by tainting water supplies.

=== Taliban attacks in rural Ghazni Province and elsewhere ===
During the battle in Ghazni city, Taliban forces across Ghazni Province carried out attacks. The insurgents again cut Highway 1 after having previously done so for over a month during May and June. Taliban forces also assaulted the outlying districts of Ajristan and Khwaja Umari where they seized towns, killed dozens of government troops and forced others to retreat. Furthermore, the insurgents captured five districts of Ghazni Province, while contesting six others, during the offensive. As the Taliban had already held five districts before the fighting, this reduced overall government control in Ghazni Province to three districts.

During the battle, around 1,000 Taliban fighters attacked and seized a government base, known as Chinese Camp, in Ghormach District, northern Faryab Province, killing or taking prisoner around 100 Afghan troops whom the government made almost no effort to resupply or reinforce during their two-day battle with the Taliban forces.

On 15 August the Taliban killed 45 government troops and police while capturing a base in Baghlani Jadid District, Baghlan Province.

=== Police and military ===
At least 14 security forces were killed and many other were wounded, when the battle began. Since then many other policemen have lost their lives. On 17 September, Taliban attacked Afghan police and military bases, killing around 10 security personnel.

Poorly armed and underpaid police of Afghanistan is forced to fight against Taliban militants without proper training and weapons. The policemen have been deprived of their salaries as well.

== Aftermath ==
=== U.S. Army involvement ===
Although U.S. Army had maintained that it had ended its combat missions in 2014, this battle proved that U.S. forces still routinely rush to save Afghan forces struggling to contain a resurgent Taliban. U.S. special forces unit took an active part in the battle for Ghazni city.

=== Humanitarian consequences ===
On 13 August, the United Nations warned that food supplies in Ghazni were running low and that medication at the main hospital was becoming scarce. People who fled the city also reported food and water was becoming scarce.

=== Reactions ===
- The former head of the National Directorate of Security, Asadullah Khalid, affirmed that "the main reason behind the fall of some parts of Ghazni city to militants is the inattention of security agencies".
- A number of MPs and provincial council members from Ghazni said the province had been facing threats for months, but according to them the government did not pay attention to the matter.
- A number of former military officers commenting on the battle in Ghazni blamed local security officials for poor management.
- A senior Afghan official said that the authorities' response to the Taliban attack on Ghazni was chaotic.
- Afghan President Ashraf Ghani publicly admitted that he was unaware about the situation in Ghazni city, and it was only on the third day of the Taliban attack on Ghazni city, that he was informed about the desperate situation of the city.
- Before the fall of Chinese camp to Talibans, Afghan soldiers stationed at Chinese camp heavily criticized the Afghan government and the military for abandoning them. They claimed that the Afghan military prioritised ferrying ISIS prisoners in helicopters over using those helicopters to re-supply the camp. The soldiers asked whether those ISIS militants were prisoners or honoured guest for the government.

=== Course of war ===
In course of heavy and prolonged fighting in 2019 and 2020, the Afghan government retook some areas in Ghazni Province that had been lost to the rebels during the 2018 offensive.
