= Combat Aviation Advisors =

United States Air Force special operations aviation advisors

- Combat Aviation Advisor beret flash
- Active: 1994–2022
- Country: United States
- Branch: United States Air Force
- Type: Special Operations Forces
- Role: Aviation Foreign Internal Defense (AvFID)
- Size: Operational Aviation Detachments (OADs)
- Part of: Air Force Special Operations Command
- Garrison/HQ: Duke Field, FL
- Nickname: CAA
- Motto: Deditissimus Vincit ("The Most Committed Wins")

Combat Aviation Advisors (CAAs) were United States Air Force Special Operations Command operators assigned primarily to the 6th Special Operations Squadron (6th SOS), a unit of Air Force Special Operations Command (AFSOC). Combat Aviation Advisors conducted Aviation Foreign Internal Defense (AvFID), Security Force Assistance (SFA), Unconventional Warfare (UW), and Irregular Warfare missions in support of United States special operations objectives.

Combat Aviation Advisors operated in mission-tailored Operational Aviation Detachments (OADs) and conducted operations by, with, and through foreign aviation forces to train, advise, and assist partner nation aviation units.

For nearly three decades, the 6th Special Operations Squadron served as the Air Force's only organization specifically trained, organized, and equipped to conduct aviation advising and Aviation Foreign Internal Defense missions.

Combat Aviation Advisors were authorized to wear a charcoal brown beret as a symbol of distinction within the air advising enterprise. The beret was approved for wear by Air Force Special Operations Command in 2018 and was accompanied by a distinctive Combat Aviation Advisor beret flash. According to Air Force Special Operations Command, the brown color symbolized the ability to identify potential where others see barrenness and reflected the commitment required to develop partner nation aviation capabilities through advisory operations.

The Combat Aviation Advisor motto Deditissimus Vincit ("The Most Committed Wins") was associated with the CAA mission and the heritage of the 6th Special Operations Squadron.

== Mission ==
Combat Aviation Advisors supported United States special operations objectives through Aviation Foreign Internal Defense (AvFID), Security Force Assistance (SFA), Unconventional Warfare (UW), and Irregular Warfare missions conducted alongside foreign aviation and special operations forces. United States Special Operations Command (USSOCOM) identified Combat Aviation Advisors as Air Commandos responsible for conducting special operations activities by, with, and through foreign aviation forces.

Mission areas included:

- Aviation Foreign Internal Defense (AvFID)
- Security Force Assistance (SFA)
- Unconventional Warfare (UW)
- Irregular Warfare
- Counterinsurgency (COIN)
- Counterterrorism Operations

== Organization ==
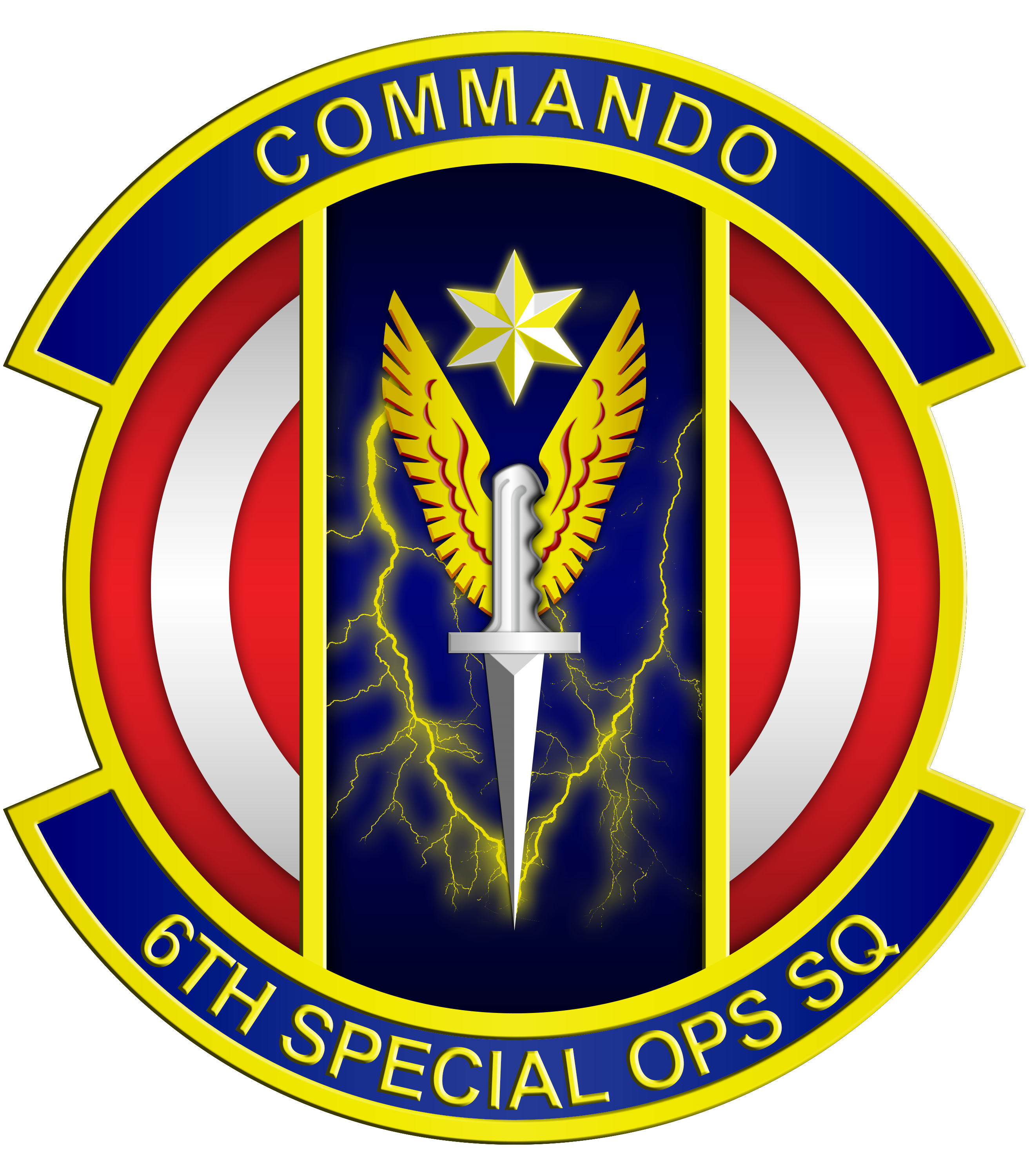
Insignia of the 6th Special Operations Squadron, the primary operational unit associated with the Combat Aviation Advisor mission.

Combat Aviation Advisors were most closely associated with the 6th Special Operations Squadron (6th SOS), a unit under Air Force Special Operations Command (AFSOC). Prior to the divestment of the Combat Aviation Advisor mission, the squadron specialized in Aviation Foreign Internal Defense (AvFID), assessing, training, advising, and assisting foreign aviation forces in airpower employment, sustainment, and force integration.

Combat Aviation Advisors frequently operated in small Operational Aviation Detachments (OADs), mission-tailored teams organized to integrate with foreign aviation and special operations forces. OADs advised foreign aviation organizations at the tactical, operational, and headquarters levels and assisted partner forces in the employment, sustainment, and integration of airpower capabilities.

USSOCOM employed mission-tailored Combat Aviation Advisor OADs to support geographic combatant commanders through aviation-focused Foreign Internal Defense, Security Force Assistance, and Unconventional Warfare activities.

Personnel assigned to Combat Aviation Advisor duties originated from numerous Air Force specialties, including:

- Pilots
- Combat Systems Officers
- Special Mission Aviators
- Intelligence Personnel
- Communications Specialists
- Maintenance Specialists
- Aircrew Flight Equipment Personnel
- Security Forces Personnel
- Survival, Evasion, Resistance and Escape (SERE) Specialists

Eligible specialties and qualifications were identified in official Combat Aviation Advisor application guidance.

== Capabilities ==
Combat Aviation Advisors provided aviation-focused special operations capabilities in support of United States and partner nation objectives. Operational capabilities identified in Air Force Special Operations Command Combat Aviation Advisor publications included:

- Special Operations Mobility
- Intelligence, Surveillance and Reconnaissance (ISR)
- Precision Strike
- Agile Combat Support

These operational capabilities supported Aviation Foreign Internal Defense and Security Force Assistance missions conducted alongside foreign aviation and special operations forces.

== Assessment, Selection and Training ==
Combat Aviation Advisors were selected through a competitive application, assessment, and screening process administered by Air Force Special Operations Command (AFSOC). Candidates were drawn from multiple officer and enlisted Air Force specialties and were required to meet career field-specific qualification standards. The Combat Aviation Advisor training pipeline typically required more than one year to complete and included advisor training, language and cultural instruction, advanced tactical skills, and specialty-specific qualification training.

Selected personnel completed a multi-phase training pipeline designed to prepare advisors for Aviation Foreign Internal Defense (AvFID), Security Force Assistance (SFA), and Irregular Warfare missions. Training phases included Advanced Tactical Fieldcraft, Advisor Tradecraft, Culture and Language Training, and Air Force Specialty Code (AFSC)-specific instruction.

The Combat Aviation Advisor Mission Qualification Course (CAAMQC) was a four-phase training pipeline requiring approximately 12 to 18 months to complete. Training emphasized advanced tactical fieldcraft, advanced weapons and tactics, advisor tradecraft, culture and language proficiency, and Air Force Specialty Code (AFSC)-specific qualification skills necessary for Aviation Foreign Internal Defense and Security Force Assistance missions.

The 371st Special Operations Combat Training Squadron conducted Combat Aviation Advisor assessment, selection, qualification, mission qualification, and upgrade training in support of the Combat Aviation Advisor enterprise. Training events evaluated candidates' suitability for advisory operations and prepared personnel for deployment in Operational Aviation Detachments (OADs).

Successful completion of the Combat Aviation Advisor training pipeline culminated in Raven Claw, a field training exercise designed to evaluate candidates' ability to operate in austere and unconventional environments. Upon completion of Raven Claw, candidates were awarded the Air Commando tab, signifying successful completion of the most demanding phase of Combat Aviation Advisor training.

Combat Aviation Advisor qualifications were managed through the Air Force 8LXXX Air Advisor and Combat Aviation Advisor Special Duty Identifier (SDI) structure. Enlisted Combat Aviation Advisor identifiers included:

- 8L700 – Enlisted Combat Aviation Advisor
- 8L800 – Enlisted Combat Aviation Advisor Team Sergeant
- 8L900 – Enlisted Combat Aviation Advisor Team Leader

Officer Combat Aviation Advisor identifiers included:

- 89G0 – Combat Aviation Advisor
- 89H0 – Combat Aviation Advisor Team Leader
- 89I0 – Combat Aviation Advisor Mission Commander

These identifiers were used to manage qualification, training, force development, and operational assignment requirements for Combat Aviation Advisor personnel.

== Afghanistan ==
During the War in Afghanistan, Combat Aviation Advisors worked extensively alongside the Afghan Air Force and the Afghan Special Mission Wing (SMW). Advisory efforts focused on developing foreign aviation capabilities and special operations aviation employment.

== Reorganization and Divestment ==
In 2022, Air Force Special Operations Command divested the Combat Aviation Advisor capability and converted the 6th Special Operations Squadron to an MC-130J Commando II operational squadron. The decision ended nearly three decades of dedicated Aviation Foreign Internal Defense and Irregular Warfare advising within the United States Air Force.

Air Force Instruction 10-4301 subsequently identified Combat Aviation Advisor as a legacy Special Operations Forces identifier.

== See also ==
- 6th Special Operations Squadron
- Air Force Special Operations Command
- Foreign Internal Defense
- Irregular Warfare
- Security Force Assistance
