= Afghan National Army Commando Corps =

Commando force of the Afghan National Army

Afghan National Army Commandos
- ANA Commando patch
- Active: 2007–2021
- Country: Afghanistan
- Branch: Afghan National Army
- Type: Special operations forces
- Role: Air assault, light infantry, shock troops, counterinsurgency
- Size: 11,700 Commandos (ten battalions)
- Part of: ANA Special Operations Command
- Headquarters: Camp Morehead, Kabul Province, Afghanistan
- Engagements: War in Afghanistan: Operation Commando Fury; Battle of Shok Valley; Operation Moshtarak; Battle of Kunduz (2015); Mohmand Valley raid; 2021 Taliban offensive

The Afghan National Army Commandos were the light infantry and direct action force of the Afghan National Army (ANA). During the war in Afghanistan against the Taliban insurgency, the Commandos represented 7% of the Afghan National Security Forces (ANSF) but conducted 70% to 80% of the fighting. The structure of the unit was based on the United States Army's 75th Ranger Regiment. They were responsible for raids on strategic targets and for assisting the regular army in counterinsurgency operations.

The Commandos were widely regarded as the most effective part of the Afghan security forces and were heavily depended on by the Afghan and U.S. leadership. They were partnered with foreign special operations units, particularly the United States Army Special Forces (Green Berets), and frequently conducted missions together. A total of ten Commando battalions were organized between 2007 and 2021. From 2011, the Commandos were part of the ANA Special Operations Command (ANASOC). Commando battalions functioned on 18-week cycles with six weeks each of training, operations, and recovery. The Commando Training Center was located at Camp Morehead near Kabul.

Their notable operations included the retaking of the city of Kunduz from the Taliban in 2015 and the Mohmand Valley raid that killed the leader of the Islamic State in Afghanistan in 2017. After the U.S. withdrew the majority of its troops by 2015, the Afghan government became reliant on the Commandos. Despite an effort by the U.S. and NATO to make them capable of independent operations, the Commandos still depended on foreign support after 2015, due to the Afghan military's logistical problems and the country's lack of infrastructure. The Commandos and the Afghan Air Force were sent by the government to respond to the 2021 Taliban offensive, but they found themselves isolated and with no logistical support as the regular forces collapsed.

After the fall of Kabul and the Islamic Republic of Afghanistan in August 2021, the Commando units were dissolved along with the rest of the ANA. The new Taliban regime claimed it reactivated the unit with a new flag and a new emblem, in the Islamic Emirate Army, but it is unknown if any of the previous personnel or training got transferred. The majority of former Commandos are reportedly living in the country in hiding, though some are known to have joined the Republican insurgency in Afghanistan against the Taliban.

== History ==
=== Formation ===
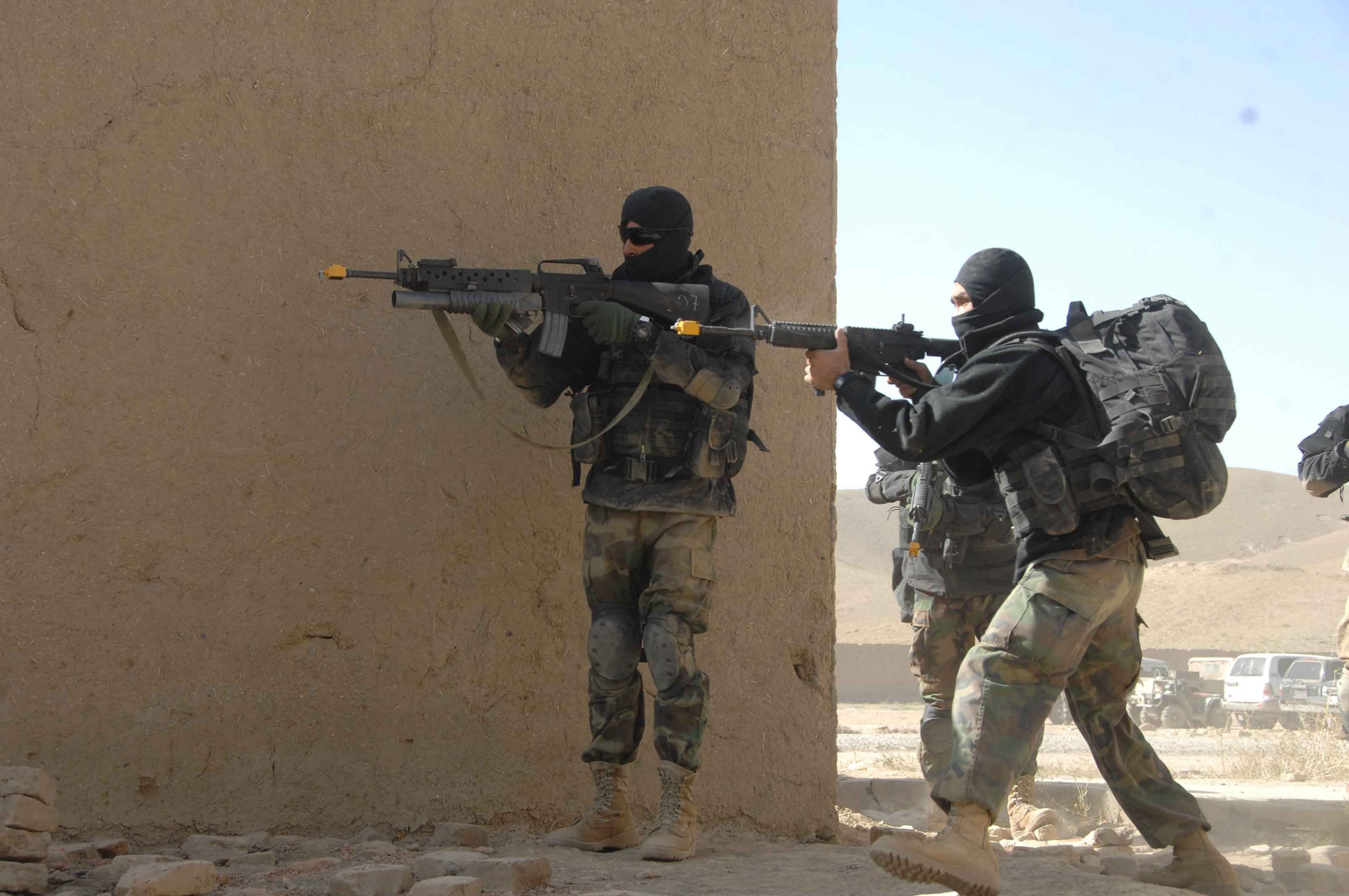
Some of the first recruits taking the Commando Course, 7 October 2007.

During the United States invasion of Afghanistan in 2001 and the start of Operation Enduring Freedom, the first phase of the War in Afghanistan, the U.S. Army Special Forces (Green Berets) worked with Afghan local militias against the Taliban. The war effort eventually transitioned from removing the Taliban from power to assisting the U.S.-backed Islamic Republic of Afghanistan, led by President Hamid Karzai. The U.S. initially had no plans to establish a special operations force for the Afghan National Army, the military of the new government, but after the success of the U.S.-organized Iraqi SOF, the decision was made to create a similar unit in Afghanistan.

Known as the ANA Commandos or Afghan Commandos, their purpose would be to work with allied special operations units and conduct missions that were too complex for ANA regular forces. In late 2006 it was determined that instead of being organized like the Green Berets the new Afghan unit would become elite light infantry similar to the United States Army Rangers, due to the belief that the situation in Afghanistan was different and had different requirements. Afghan leaders were also consulted and made suggestions based on their experience with the previous Afghan Commando Forces, which had been organized by the Soviet military during the Soviet-Afghan War.

The creation of the Commandos received critical support from the ANA chief of operations, Major General Sher Mohammad Karimi, himself a graduate of the Special Forces Qualification Course in the United States. In November 2006, a battalion of soldiers from the Afghan Army's 201st Corps, led by Lieutenant Colonel Mohammad Farid Ahmadi, was selected to be the first to go through Commando training, because it had high morale compared to other units.

The battalion graduated in July 2007 after three months of training at a base just outside of Kabul. U.S. advisors set up the Commando Training Center at Camp Morehead, and from the first battalion also trained a cadre of 100 Afghan instructors to assist them. They underwent six months of training in Jordan. Camp Morehead was also the same base that the Soviets had used to train their Afghan Commandos. At the time there was a plan for each of the five ANA corps to eventually have a Commando unit and for one to be stationed in Kabul as a rapid counter-terrorism force. The first unit to graduate was named the 1st Commando Kandak (battalion), and was on duty from August 2007. Its original structure consisted of three Commando companies and one headquarters and service company.

=== Operation Enduring Freedom ===
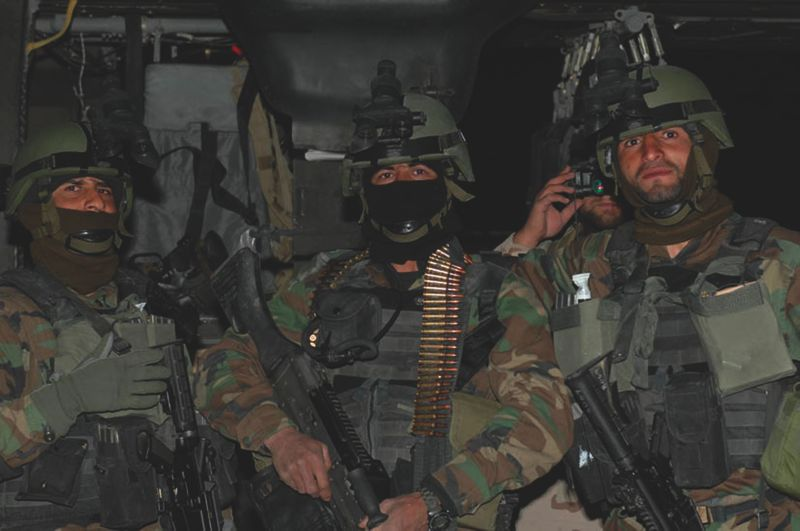
Soldiers of the 1st Commando Kandak before the "Say Laab" operation, February 2008.

The first operation of the 1st Commando Kandak was from 12–14 September 2007, capturing a Taliban explosive maker in Sherzad District, Nangarhar Province, while working with the Afghan police and being advised by coalition forces. From 10–14 November 2007, in a joint operation with the Afghan National Police known as Operation Commando Fury, the 1st Commando Kandak successfully raided a Taliban facility in the Tagab District, Kapisa Province. In February 2008, an operation by Commandos known as "Say Laab" in the Helmand Province reportedly resulted in the death of an important Taliban commander, Abdul Bari. By April 2008 three commando battalions were functional and had carried out targeted raids that killed or captured 30 insurgent leaders in eastern Afghanistan, while working with U.S. Special Forces ODAs.

In April 2008, about 100 Commandos from the first battalion took part in the Battle of Shok Valley alongside Green Berets on a mission to eliminate Gulbuddin Hekmatyar, warlord of the militia Hezb-e Islami Gulbuddin. The enemy force was stronger than expected, and Commandos notably fought in a counterattack to push militia fighters away from a casualty evacuation site during the seven-hour gunfight. They were led by a Green Beret sergeant who later received the Medal of Honor for leading the counterattack and saving the lives of several injured soldiers. Hekmatyar was able to escape.

While the original plan by the International Security Assistance Force (ISAF) was for one brigade with six kandaks, the ANA wanted a full division with three brigades and 15 kandaks. Two battalions were operational from 2007, three from 2008, and one from 2009, finishing the original plan. As of 2010 there was a 1st Commando Brigade that consisted of one battalion in Kabul, and was also known as the National Commando Brigade, while the other five battalions were each assigned to a regional corps. When the last battalion entered service, the head of the Combined Forces Special Operations Command – Afghanistan ordered the creation of another four. Two were operational from 2010, one from 2011, and the last from 2015.

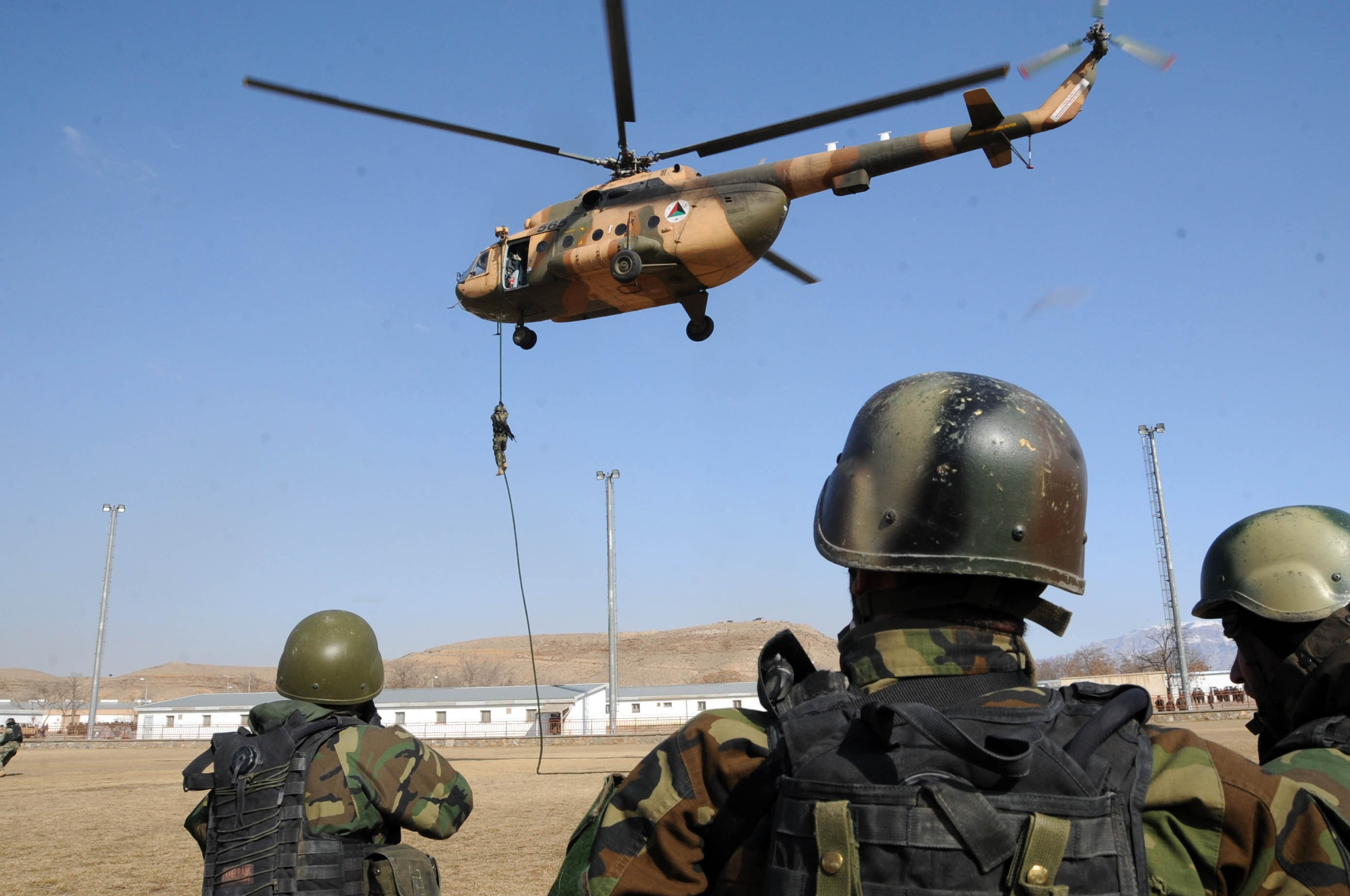
Commandos during fast rope training from an Afghan Air Force Mil Mi-17, 16 February 2010.

In 2010 the Afghan National Army Special Forces (ANASF) were established to assist with providing human intelligence, foreign internal defense, and advising Afghan regular units. Their focus was on reconnaissance and covert operations while Commandos conducted raids. Recruits were found among the Commandos and they were put through several months of training by Green Berets. Graduates received the Special Forces tab in addition to their Commando tab. Afghan Special Forces Commando teams were modeled on U.S. Special Forces ODA teams. However, this also had an impact on the Commando battalions, because some of their trained personnel were sent to the Special Forces, and they now had to compete with a higher-tier unit for recruits.

In September 2010, the Afghan Information Dissemination Operations (AIDO) Planners course was established for Afghan special forces and commandos to be trained in Military Information Support Operations (MISO).

In mid-2011 the Afghan National Army Special Operations Command (ANASOC) was organized to oversee Commando, Special Forces, and other special operations-capable units. The staff of the ANA 1st Commando Brigade headquarters provided the cadre for the ANASOC headquarters.

Commandos responded to the January 2010 Kabul attack. On 25 May 2010, a force of 300 to 500 Taliban fighters, including foreign fighters, attacked the district capital of Barg-i Matal District, Nuristan Province. It was abandoned by the Afghan Local Police to avoid civilian casualties. The district was the site of a Taliban supply line as it was located near the border with Pakistan. Following ISAF airstrikes against Taliban targets on 31 May, around 200 Afghan commandos conducted an air assault that retook the district and linked up with the local police. The operation restored Afghan government control over the area. On 25 July 2010, Commandos and U.S. forces conducted a night raid in Arghandab District, Kandahar Province, as part of Operation Hamkari, aimed at removing the Taliban presence around the city of Kandahar. During 13–16 May 2011, the 5th Commando Kandak and U.S. forces raided Taliban fighters in the Qaysar District, Faryab Province, and reportedly killed a high-ranking leader.

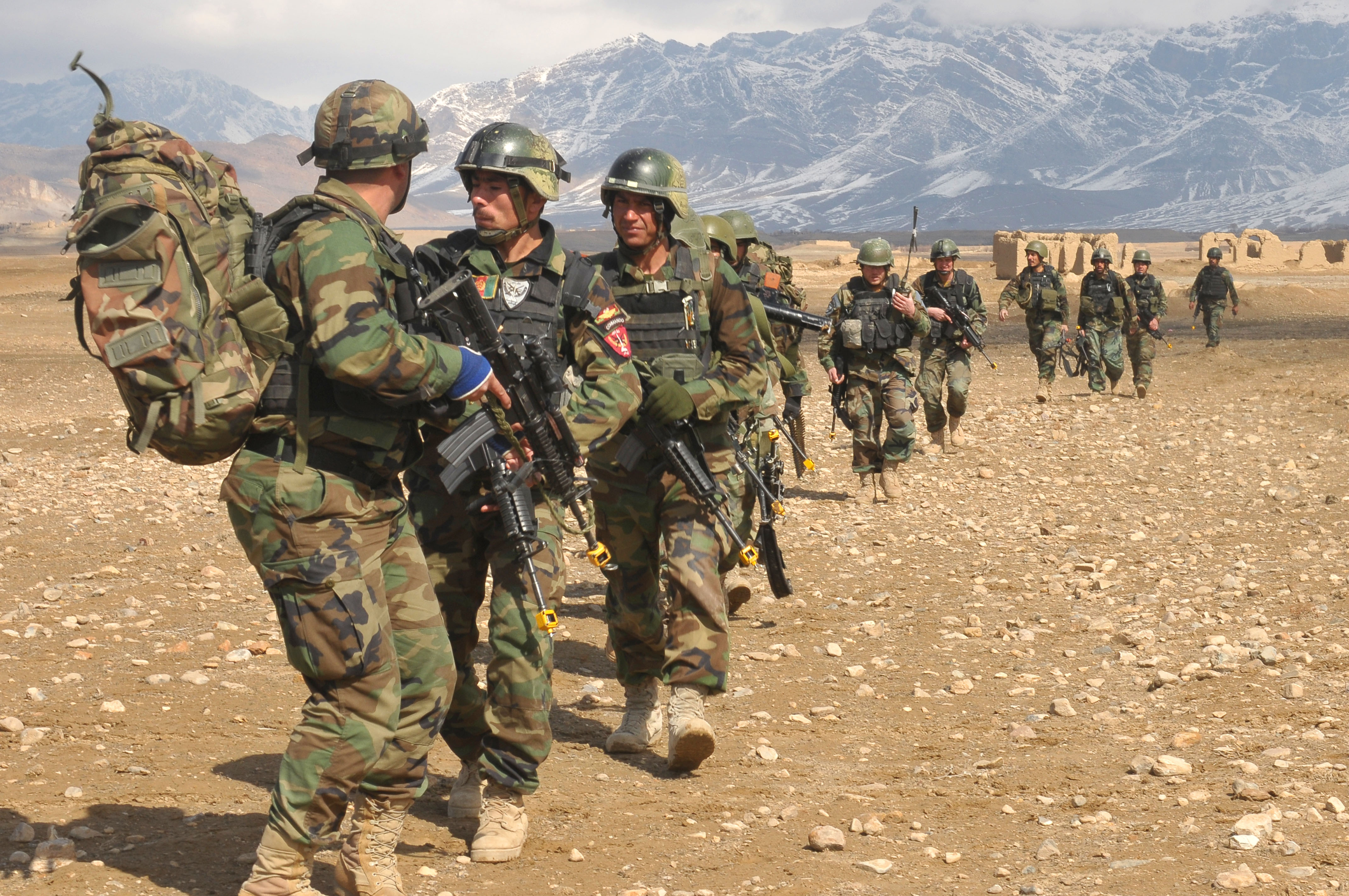
Afghan Special Forces Commandos on a training exercise near Kabul, 5 March 2011.

On 6 August 2011 a U.S. Chinook helicopter transporting 38 personnel, including seven Afghan Commandos and their interpreter, was shot down by insurgents in the Wardak Province, killing all aboard. In March 2012 members of the 1st, 2nd, and 6th Commando Kandaks took part in clearing operations throughout eastern Afghanistan. On 8 April 2012, the U.S. and Afghan authorities signed a memorandum of understanding that Afghan forces would take the lead on special operations missions. As the U.S. began reducing its troops in Afghanistan, a significant portion of those who were left were special operators working with the Commandos and ANASOC. The Afghan Commandos started taking a larger role in planning and leading their operations.

The Afghan Air Force (AAF) notably carried out a mission with Commandos that was entirely planned, led, and implemented by the Afghan military on 20 February 2013, in the Kandahar Province. The 2nd Special Operations Brigade was established around this time and was responsible for western Afghanistan. It consisted of the 3rd, 4th, 7th, and 9th Commando Kandaks. The brigade created an extra layer of command between the kandaks and the division and corps commanders. In August 2013 soldiers of the 2nd brigade received a Presidential Valorous Combat Unit award for actions in the Herat Province. In September 2013 the 5th Commando Kandak cleared several villages and insurgent bases in Badakhshan Province with regular units from the ANA 209th Corps, which resulted in the death of a Taliban commander.

=== Operation Freedom's Sentinel ===
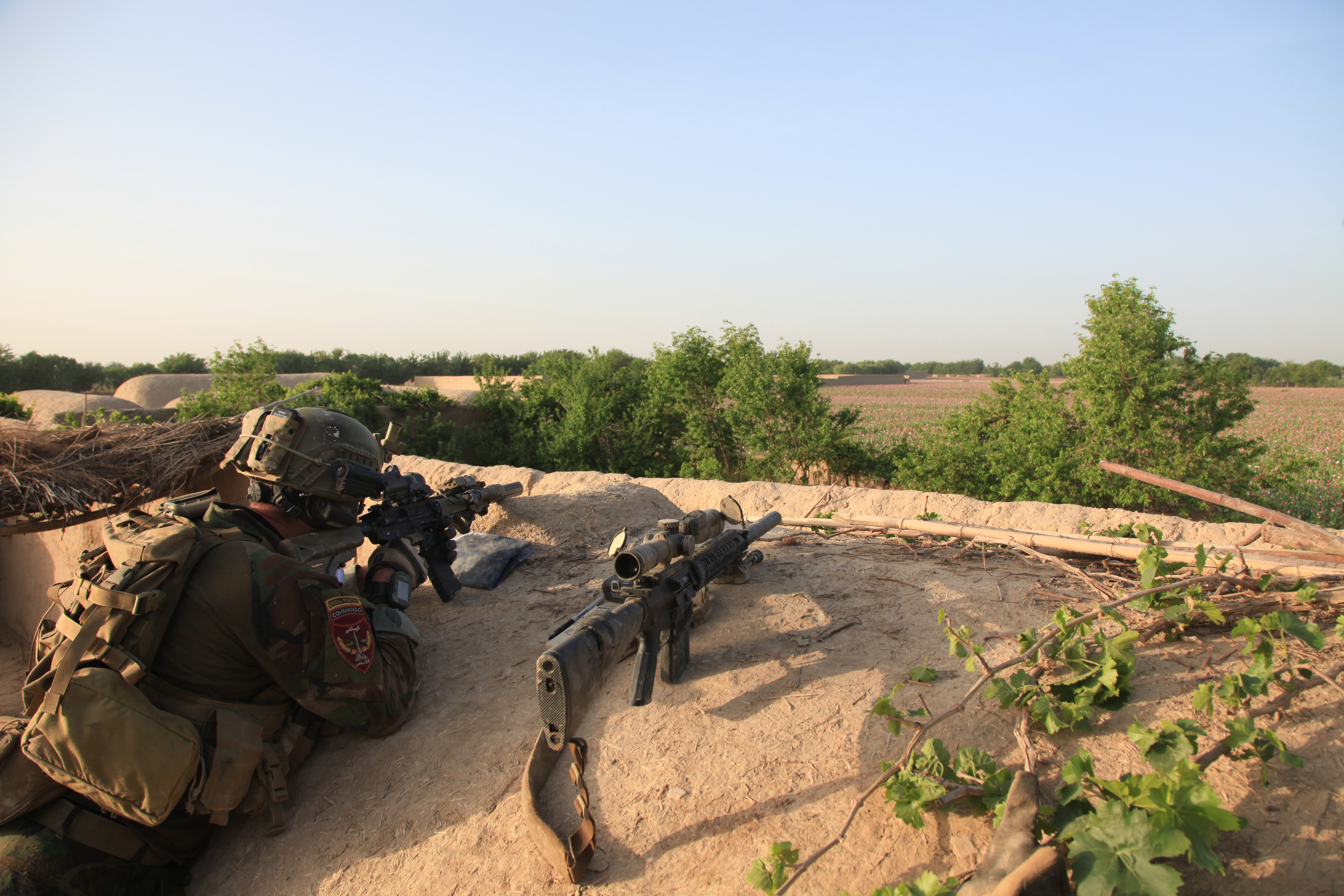
An Afghan Special Forces Commando waits in ambush with a U.S. Marine Raider in Helmand Province, 15 April 2012.

During 2014 and 2015, President Barack Obama reduced troop levels in Afghanistan as the international coalition shifted from Operation Enduring Freedom to Operation Freedom's Sentinel. This signified the coalition's change in focus from combat to strengthening Afghan institutions. The ISAF was replaced by NATO's Resolute Support Mission for providing training and guidance. The Afghan National Security Forces (ANSF) became entirely responsible for military operations from 1 January 2015, and from this point the Taliban were able to consistently expand their territory.

Direct involvement in Afghan Commando missions by U.S. advisors decreased as the U.S. shifted to a supporting role, but during 2017, only 17% of their missions had been conducted independently of foreign support. With the exception of a few, most Commando units struggled to transition to independent operations and remained heavily reliant on U.S. assistance. Because of the logistical problems and corruption in the Afghan military, and the country's lack of infrastructure, Commando battalions were not capable of sustaining operations for more than 72 hours.

The Commandos were still regarded as the most capable units in the Afghan military. In the first six months of 2015, 82% of ANSF operations were carried out by Commandos and other ANASOC units. By 2016 the Afghan security forces were becoming over-reliant on the Commandos, as they had to make up for the shortfalls of the regular army and police, and many Commandos had seen more combat than their U.S. Special Forces advisors. They were in such high demand by the regular Afghan army that on some occasions the battalions that were in the recovery cycle were called back into service early. Their operations were lasting as long as 20 days and they were seeing increasing casualties. By 2016 their fatality rate had doubled from 2014. Even though the Commandos comprised 7% of the Afghan National Security Forces, they conducted 70% to 80% of the fighting.

During the Taliban's 2015 summer offensive only the Commandos and their U.S. advisors prevented the total defeat of several thousand ANA regular troops. On 28 September 2015, the Taliban captured the city of Kunduz from a much larger force of regular troops and police, many of whom did not fight. As the first provincial capital to fall, it represented a major Taliban victory and became a crisis for the recently elected president Ashraf Ghani. Commandos were able to get into the city with U.S. air support on 1 October and retook control of Kunduz after four days of street fighting. They also had a pivotal role during the 2016 campaign season, with fighting in the provinces of Kunduz, Helmand, and Nangarhar.

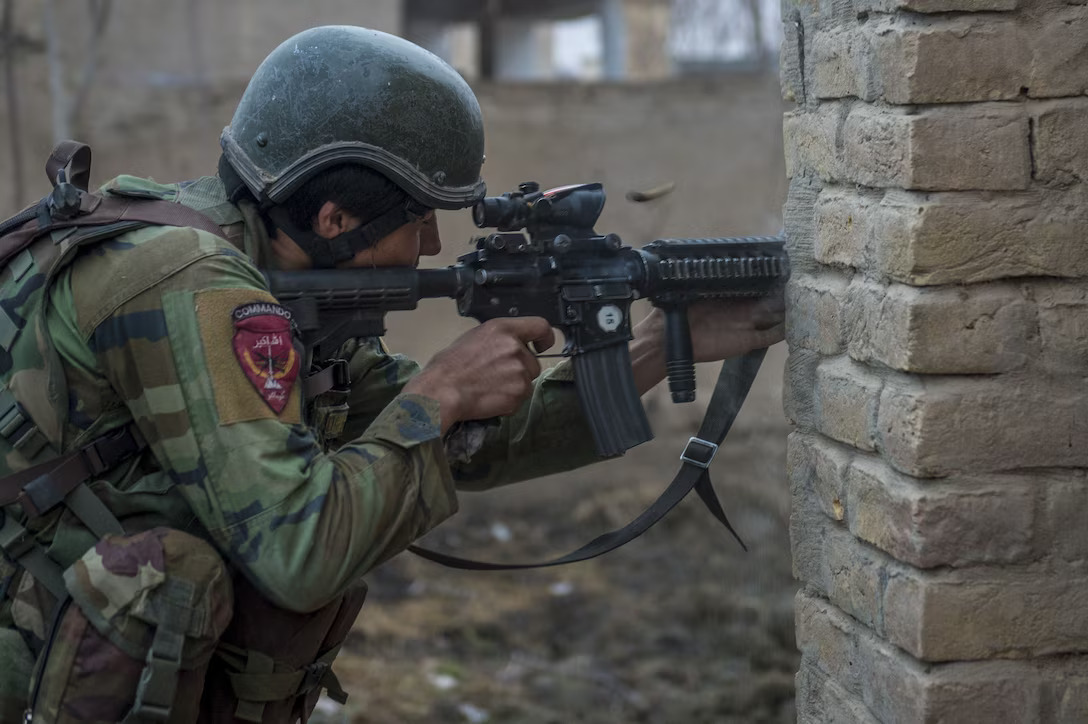
A Commando fighting during an offensive in the Kunduz Province, 20 January 2018.

On the evening of 26 April 2017, the Mohmand Valley raid in Nangarhar Province by the U.S. 75th Ranger Regiment and Afghan Special Forces Commandos resulted in the deaths of multiple Islamic State members, including the leader of its regional affiliate for Afghanistan, Abdul Haseeb Logari. On 19 November, a night raid in the Helmand Province by the 7th Commando Kandak freed more than 15 captives that were being held by the Taliban for their relatives having joined the Afghan security forces. The Commandos and the ANSF succeeded in denying the Taliban their stated objective for the year 2017, which was to capture a provincial capital.

A night raid by the 7th Commando Kandak on 1 January 2018 in the Nahr-e Saraj District, Helmand Province, killed seven members of the Taliban's elite Red Unit and destroyed over 1,000 kilograms of drugs. In June 2018, three Afghan Special Forces companies and two Commando Kandaks joined six U.S. Green Beret teams in a major operation against Islamic State militants in Nangarhar Province. It was one of their largest operations and captured from the group its local capital in eastern Afghanistan.

In August 2017 President Ashraf Ghani announced the Afghan 2020 Roadmap, which ordered the Commandos to be doubled in size, and was projected to bring the force up to 20 kandaks with 23,300 total soldiers. However, the staff of the Commando Training School opposed this proposal, because the school was already struggling to maintain current force levels with the amount of casualties, desertions, and soldiers completing their contracts. Instead they proposed adding another company to each battalion, to increase the power of existing Commando units. For this to be accomplished, some regular ANA units were ordered to Camp Morehead and were put through the Commando Course. Few candidates failed the training. New facilities also had to be built, and there were difficulties in fully equipping units. Still, by 2021 ANASOC units represented one-fifth of the Afghan National Security Forces.

As of 2020 the ten Commando special operations kandaks (SOKs) were the main component of ANASOC, with most of them distributed among four Special Operations Brigades, except for the 6th Kandak assigned to the National Mission Brigade in Kabul. The latter provided the president of Afghanistan and the Ministry of Defense with a rapid response capability. By the start of 2021 the Commandos and other ANASOC units were losing 1,200 men every month.

During the early stages of the 2021 Taliban offensive that began on 1 May 2021, the Commandos, who were already heavily relied on, saw a 30% increase in their operations by the end of June as the regular Afghan forces were being overrun. This was in part because Afghan military logistics were disrupted by the Taliban taking control of some of the road networks, and the Afghan Air Force having no ability to maintain most of its aircraft after U.S. contractors withdrew (with the exception of Mil Mi-17s). Commandos and the AAF were the main elements responding to Taliban advances. In the first two weeks of May, Commandos were deployed to retake parts of Baghlan Province from the Taliban. After a ceasefire for the holiday Eid al-Fitr in mid-May, the Taliban began attacks on areas around provincial capitals across 18 provinces. On 17 June, about 50 Commandos were ambushed in Faryab Province, and 24 were killed, including the well-known Major Sohrab Azimi, which had an impact on ANSF morale. The Taliban made major advances despite some ANSF counterattacks, such as Commandos retaking Puli Khumri in Baghlan in late June. In late July The New York Times reported that the Commandos and the Afghan Air Force were "exhausted". They continued to fight despite this, along with some other ANSF units, as the Taliban expanded its control.

Some Commando units continued to conduct nighttime raids against specific targets, though they were increasingly used as regular infantry. Commandos defended provincial capitals in Kandahar and Herat.

=== Dissolution and legacy ===
Several provincial capitals fell in the first weeks of August 2021, and during 14–15 August, the government lost control of the military, with six of the seven ANA corps having surrendered or been overrun. With no logistical or air support, the Afghan National Security Forces that continued to fight were left with no choice but to flee, negotiate a withdrawal, or fight to the death. Commandos repeatedly fought to the point of exhausting their supplies. Commando units near Kandahar, despite being surrounded, fought for a month until they ran out of ammunition. In Mazar-i-Sharif, Commandos continued to fight until local forces surrendered. Some units made their way to Panjshir Province, where the Republican insurgency in Afghanistan was assembling against the Taliban. Others provided security outside Hamid Karzai International Airport during the U.S. and allied evacuation from Kabul.

Lt. Gen. Haibatullah Alizai, who was appointed as the last ANA Chief of the General Staff on 11 August, in the last days developed a plan to use 3,000 Commandos and 10,000 other troops to set up multiple defensive lines in and around Kabul. Alizai compared it to the Northern Alliance holding out against the Taliban in northern Afghanistan during the 1990s. But it was too late, and the plan received no support from Rear Admiral Peter Vasely, the U.S. officer in charge of security during the Kabul evacuation. As part of the evacuation over 1,000 Afghan Commandos and their families were able to get to the United States, with the involvement of the CIA and other agencies.

According to the former commander of ANASOC, Lt. Gen. Mohammad Farid Ahmadi, after the fall of Afghanistan to the Taliban the majority of the Commandos continued to live in the country in hiding, and some had been detained and tortured before being released by the Taliban. There were some reports in 2022 that Iran and Russia have tried to recruit some Commandos that fled to Iran, and Ahmadi claimed that they have participated in the conflicts in Nagorno-Karabakh, Yemen, Ukraine, and Syria. According to Alizai, about 5,000 Commandos fled to Iran among tens of thousands of other Afghan soldiers. He said in October 2022 that some of them were already fighting in Ukraine after having been recruited by the Wagner Group.

The Taliban-led Islamic Emirate Army has its own Commando forces, with a new flag and sleeve insignia. The tradition of wearing a maroon beret has still been retained, previously worn by the Afghan Commando Forces and similar formations since 1970.

== Organization ==
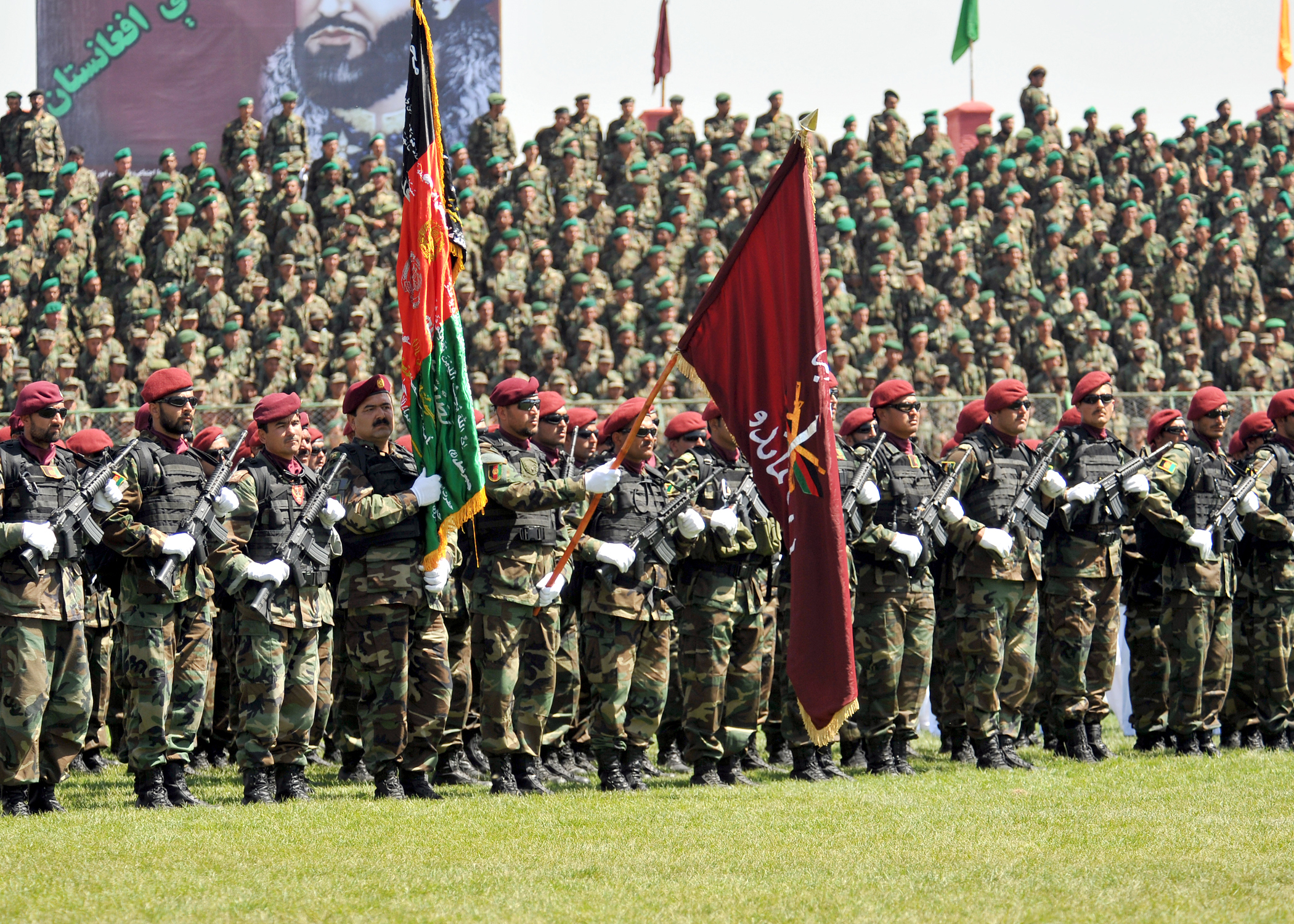
The flag of the ANA Commandos at a parade in Kabul, 2 September 2010.

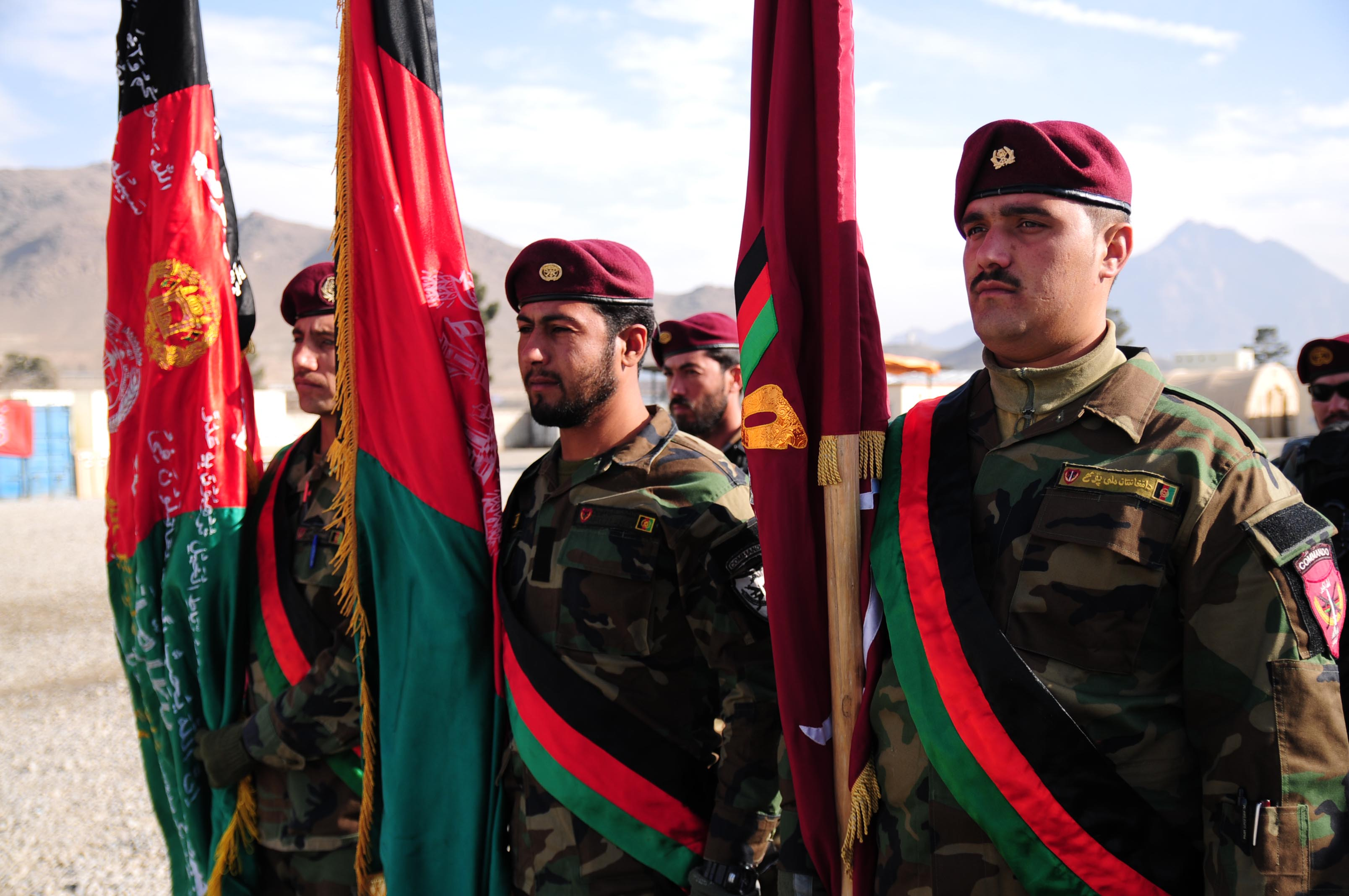
A Commando color guard at a graduation ceremony of Afghan Special Forces soldiers, 1 May 2010.

The Afghan National Army Commandos had a structure similar to the U.S. 75th Ranger Regiment, being organized into battalions known as kandaks, each having three Commando companies and one ANA Special Forces company. Each kandak also included military intelligence, engineer, and other support elements. The strength of each battalion was reported as being either around 650 or 950 men. The commando kandaks were also called special operations kandaks (SOKs). By 2019 there were ten commando kandaks in total, and they were the main component of the ANA Special Operations Command (ANASOC). Early on the kandaks were organized into one brigade, the 1st Commando Brigade, before becoming one division of two brigades as their numbers increased. The brigades provided a command and control function for the battalions. Between 2015 and 2020, the Commando structure was rearranged into four Special Operations Brigades, one for each cardinal direction, and one National Mission Brigade in Kabul. The ten kandaks had a total strength of 11,700 soldiers. After the U.S. withdrawal, an Afghan former general said that there were 30,000 commandos in Afghanistan.

The following is a list of battalions, their dates of operation, and their original regional assignment:

- 1st Commando Kandak, operational from 24 July 2007, 201st Corps.
- 2nd Commando Kandak, operational from 16 October 2007, 203rd Corps.
- 3rd Commando Kandak, operational from c. 30 January 2008, 205th Corps.
- 4th Commando Kandak, operational from 8 May 2008, 207th Corps.
- 5th Commando Kandak, operational from October 2008, 209th Corps.
- 6th Commando Kandak, operational from May 2009, National Mission Brigade, Kabul.
- 7th Commando Kandak, operational from 21 January 2010, 215th Corps.
- 8th Commando Kandak, operational from 6 May 2010, Kabul.
- 9th Commando Kandak, operational from 17 August 2010, Kabul.
- 10th Commando Kandak, operational from 2015.

The Commandos worked with U.S. advisors that often joined them in combat. The Army's 5th Special Forces Group, responsible for Central Asia, was heavily committed to Iraq, and so the 3rd and 7th Special Forces Groups rotated responsibility to train and advise in Afghanistan. Other groups also provided smaller numbers of advisors, due to the scale of the mission. The Afghan Commandos were also partnered with the U.S. Marine Raiders and the Navy SEALs. There was a lack of Pashto or Dari speakers among them, and although a Pashto learning program was established for the Green Berets, it was slow to be rolled out because of an assumption that the U.S. would be withdrawing from the country soon. Each kandak was assisted either by two Green Beret A-Teams, one Marine Raider team, or one Navy SEAL platoon.

== Selection and training ==
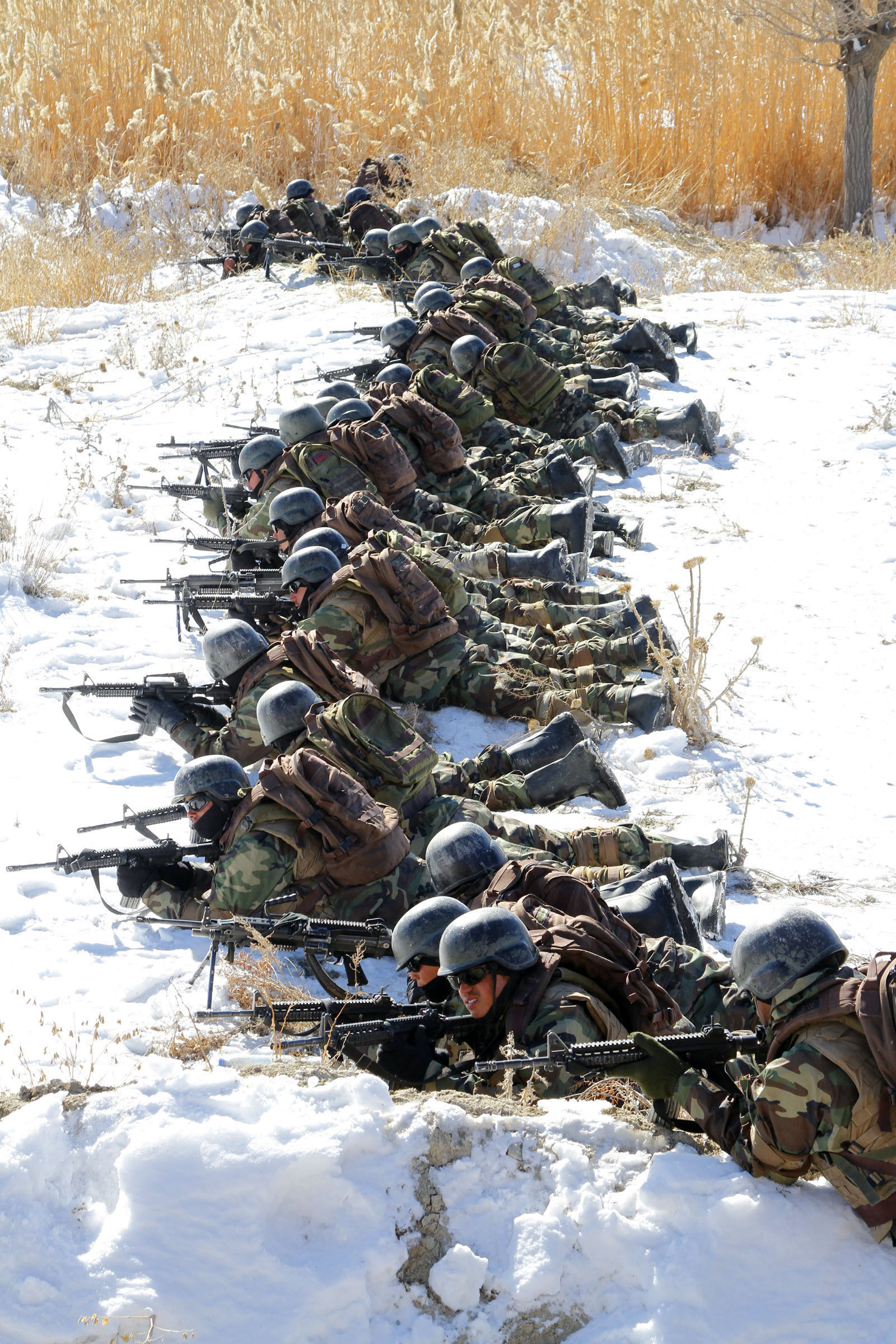
Trainees at the Camp Commando School of Excellence, 9 February 2014.

The Commandos recruited from various ANA units all over Afghanistan, taking in prospective Pashtuns, Tajik, Hazara, Uzbek, and Turkmen to prevent forms of tribal allegiance and bias. Soldiers who were motivated to make the army their career, or who had been recommended by their superiors, went to the Commandos. They had better pay and conditions compared to ANA regular units, and had the highest retention rate and lowest absentee rate. U.S. officers were involved in Commando officer selection, and there was an effort implement a meritocratic promotion system based on performance reviews.

Training was conducted at the Morehead Commando Training Center (Rish Khor camp), a longtime former Afghan Army installation located ten kilometres (six miles) south of Kabul. It was later augmented by the Camp Commando School of Excellence, also in Kabul Province. As of 2018, two Commando courses and a Cobra Strike Maneuver unit course were being run there simultaneously, with 2,000 Afghan soldiers undergoing training. Earlier that year there had been 2,500 soldiers undergoing special operations training, which was the most on record up to that point.

The 14-week Afghan Commando Qualification Course (CDOQC) began with two weeks of assessments and physical tests. The third week was land navigation, the fourth week was marksmanship, and the fifth and sixth weeks were for small unit tactics and heavy-weapons training. Weeks seven to thirteen consisted of learning tactics at the squad, platoon, and company level; air assault training; vehicle operations; infantry battle drills; and eventually blank and live-fire exercises. On the fourteenth week there was a final exercise and a graduation where new Commandos received their maroon beret. About 20% of them went on to further specialty training while the others were sent to an active Commando unit. In 2008 it was reported that 40% of Commando candidates were illiterate, and the training program included night classes to teach them to read and write. The Commando Course had a pass rate of 90%, and this was reportedly due to nearly everyone being passed to quickly increase the number of Commandos.

A group of 100 soldiers from the first Commando battalion in 2006 were trained to be instructors for future units, and as of 2010 most of them were still serving. The Afghan instructors provided the majority of the training to new candidates for the Commandos. The rest was done by special forces from the U.S., France, and the United Arab Emirates. Upon graduation, each commando kandak returned to its designated corps area along with an embedded U.S. Army Special Forces A-Team, and began going through an 18-week cycle: six weeks each of train-up, missions, and recovery. The Commandos were capable of reconnaissance, close quarters combat, raids, ambushes, and search and attack missions. One U.S. report described their role as to "conduct elite, light-infantry operations against threat networks in support of the regional corps' counter-insurgency operations and provide a strategic response capability against strategic targets."
