= ANA Special Operations Command =

- ANA Commando Flag
- Active: 2011–2021
- Country: Afghanistan
- Type: Unified combatant command
- Size: 21,000 (2017)
- Part of: Afghan National Army
- Garrison/HQ: Camp Morehead, near Kabul, Afghanistan

Insignia
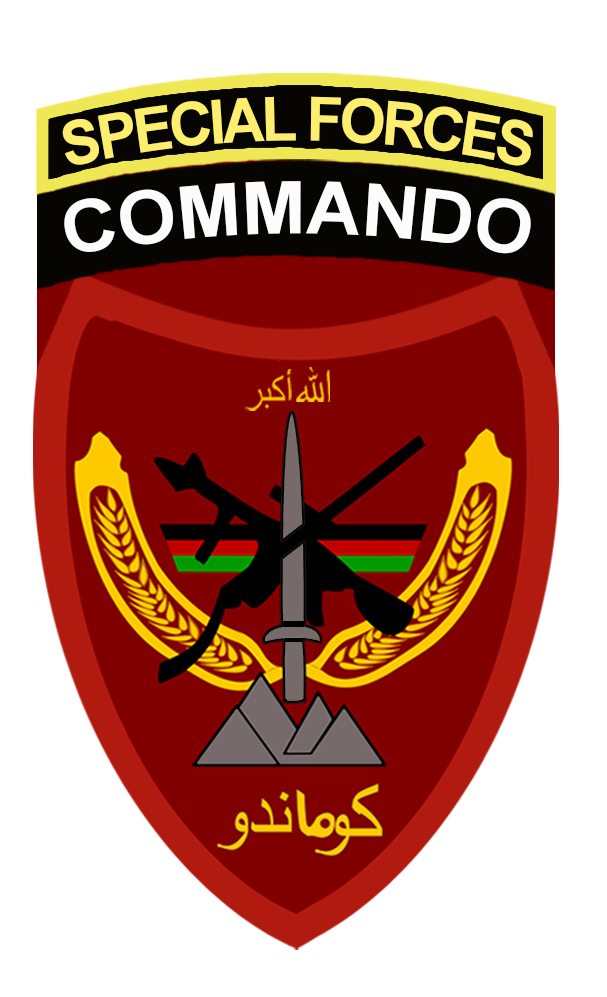
- ANA SF patch, worn by the graduating cadets during the last month of training & by all active-duty uniformed personnel.

Aircraft flown
- Helicopter: MD Helicopters MD 500 (MD-530F variant for training & assault purposes.) - Mil Mi-17
- Trainer helicopter: MD Helicopters MD 500
- Reconnaissance: Pilatus U-28 Draco
- Transport: C-130 Hercules

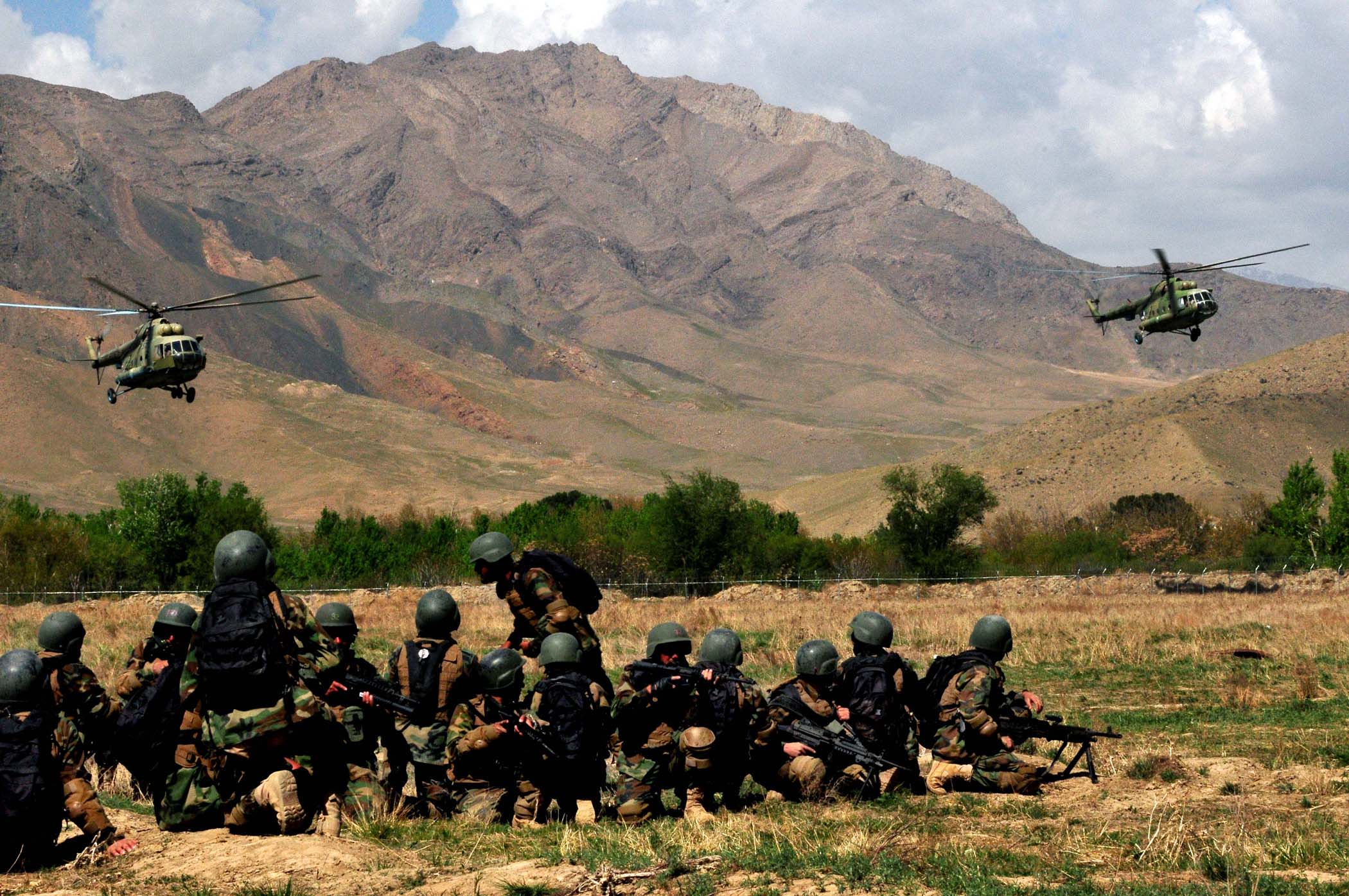
Afghan commandos from the Sixth Commando Kandak wait for two Mil Mi-17 "Hip" helicopters of the Afghan Air Force to land as they practice infiltration techniques at Camp Morehead in the outer regions of Kabul.

The Afghan National Army Special Operations Command (ANASOC) was the unified combatant command charged with overseeing the various special warfare operations component commands of the Afghan National Army, established in 2011. It eventually became a three-star command, equal in rank to the regular ANA regional corps commanders, and oversaw the Commandos (analogous to the U.S. Army Rangers), the Special Forces (analogous to the U.S. Army Special Forces), and the Special Missions Wing of the Afghan Air Force (analogous to the U.S. Air Force Special Operations Wings). The command was disbanded after the fall of Kabul.

== History ==
During its existence it was stated that the ANA Special Operations Command comprised "only seven percent of the Afghan defence and security forces." But this represented the total of the ANASOC according to the Afghan Tashkil, the Table of Organisation and Equipment - the official number of people funded for the Armed Forces. So this could have been a wishful exaggeration. The real number could've been as high as 40 percent, since the problem of ghost soldiers was rampant in the Afghan National Army, with the some estimates putting the ANA at at least a 40 percent manpower deficit. One Afghan lawmaker claimed "When we say we have 100 soldiers on the battlefield, in reality it is just 30 or 40. And this creates the potential for huge catastrophes when the enemy attacks." Afghanistan's ex-finance minister Khalid Payenda told the BBC that most of the 300,000 troops and police on the government's books did not exist, stating that the real size of the ANA could've been as low as 50,000 men and women.

This reality puts major pressure on ANASOC, which is stated to have fought in 70 percent to 80 percent of the fighting during the War in Afghanistan.

== Creation of the Commandos ==
In November 2006, a battalion of soldiers from the Afghan Army's 201st Corps was selected to be the first to go through commando training, because it had high morale compared to other units. The battalion was led by Lt. Col. Mohammad Farid Ahmadi.

In July 2007, the ANA graduated its first commandos, intended to form a battalion. The commandos underwent a grueling three-month course being trained by the United States Army Special Forces ("Green Berets"). They were fully equipped with U.S. equipment, and received specialized light infantry training with the capability to conduct combat and patrolling in urban areas, commando style raids, defusing and disposal of bombs and land mines, fast tactical shooting, hand-to-hand combat, infiltrate the area with a helicopter, reconnaissance, SERE, small unit tactics for fighting in desert and mountain terrain, and tactical emergency medical. They also provided a centrally held rapid reaction force (RRF) for the Afghan government.

Training was conducted at the Morehead Commando Training Center (Rish Khor camp), a former Taliban training compound located ten kilometres (six miles) south of Kabul. The camp was reported as being in either Wardak Province or Kabul Province. Supply, logistics and operations training was conducted by mentors from Combined Security Transition Command-Afghanistan, United States Special Operations Forces, French Special Forces, and ANA Commando personnel themselves. The first ANA Commando Kandak graduated on July 24, 2007, with Colonel Fareed Ahmadi as the Kandak commander.

The unit drew personnel from all over Afghanistan from various Afghan Army units, taking in prospective Pashtuns, Tajik, Hazara, Uzbek and Turkmen to prevent forms of tribal allegiance and bias.

3rd Special Forces Group and 7th Special Forces Group rotated responsibility to train and advise in Afghanistan.

=== Graduating classes ===
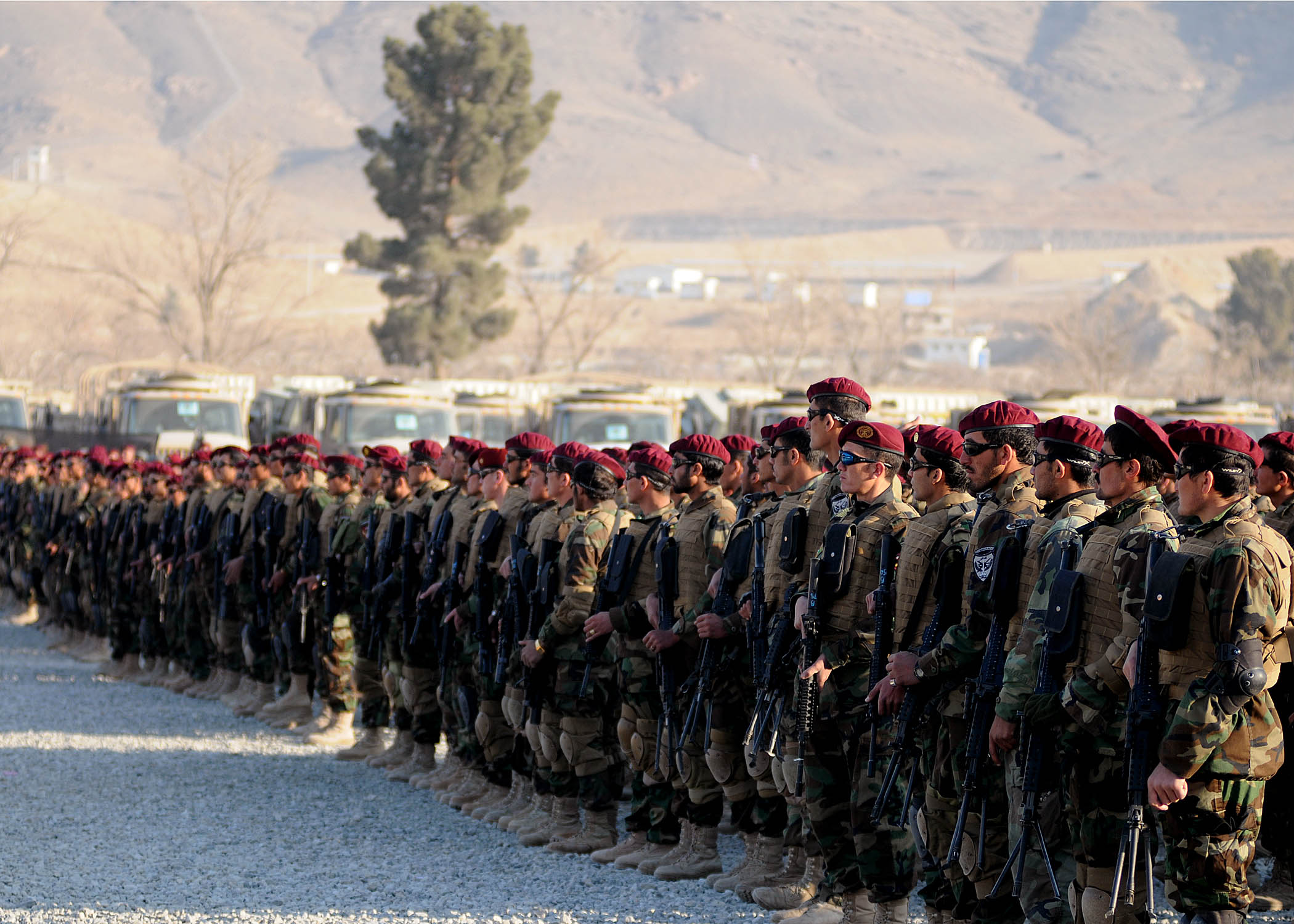
Afghan commandos stand in formation during the graduation of the 7th Commando Kandak (Battalion) in 2010

- The 1st Commando Kandak (Battalion) - graduated on July 24, 2007 - stationed with the 201st 'Selab' (Flood) Corps.
- The 203rd (2nd) Commando Battalion - Colonel Ggulam Nabi - graduated on October 16, 2007 - stationed with the 203rd 'Tandar' (Thunder) Corps of the Afghan National Army.
- The 3rd Commando Kandak - graduated on January 30, 2008 - stationed with the 1st Brigade (Kandahar) of the 205th 'Atal' (Hero) Corps.
- The 4th Commando Kandak - graduated on May 8, 2008 - stationed with the 1st Brigade (Herat) of the 207th 'Zafar' (Victory) Corps.
- The 5th Commando Kandak - graduated in October 2008 - stationed with the 209th 'Shaheen' (Falcon) Corps.
- The 6th Commando Kandak - graduated in May 2009, stationed with the 1st Commando Brigade
- The 7th Commando Kandak - graduated on January 21, 2010, stationed with the 215th 'Maiwand' (Battle) Corps.
- The 8th Commando Kandak "Lamer & Sun" - graduated on May 6, 2011, stationed with the ANA's 1st Commando Brigade.
- The 9th Commando Kandak "Cobra" - graduated on August 17, 2010, stationed with the ANA's 1st Commando Brigade.

=== Operations ===
The first ANA Commando Kandak conducted its first operation, a two-day mission, in September 2007, 50 kilometres (30 miles) southwest of Jalalabad in the Sherzad district of Nangarhar province. There they captured two large weapons caches, over 80 kg of opium and detained Haji Shir Khan, a known improvised explosive device maker.

November 2007: 3rd Toli, 1st Commando Kandak (201st Corps), conducted an air-assault raid at dawn on the compound of a high-level Taliban facilitator, kicking off a four-day offensive operation named Operation Commando Fury in the Tag Ab Valley, Kapisa Province, from November 10–14, 2007. A joint effort by the Afghan National Police and other ANA forces assisted the Commando kandak in disrupting the Taliban hold on the Tag Ab Valley.

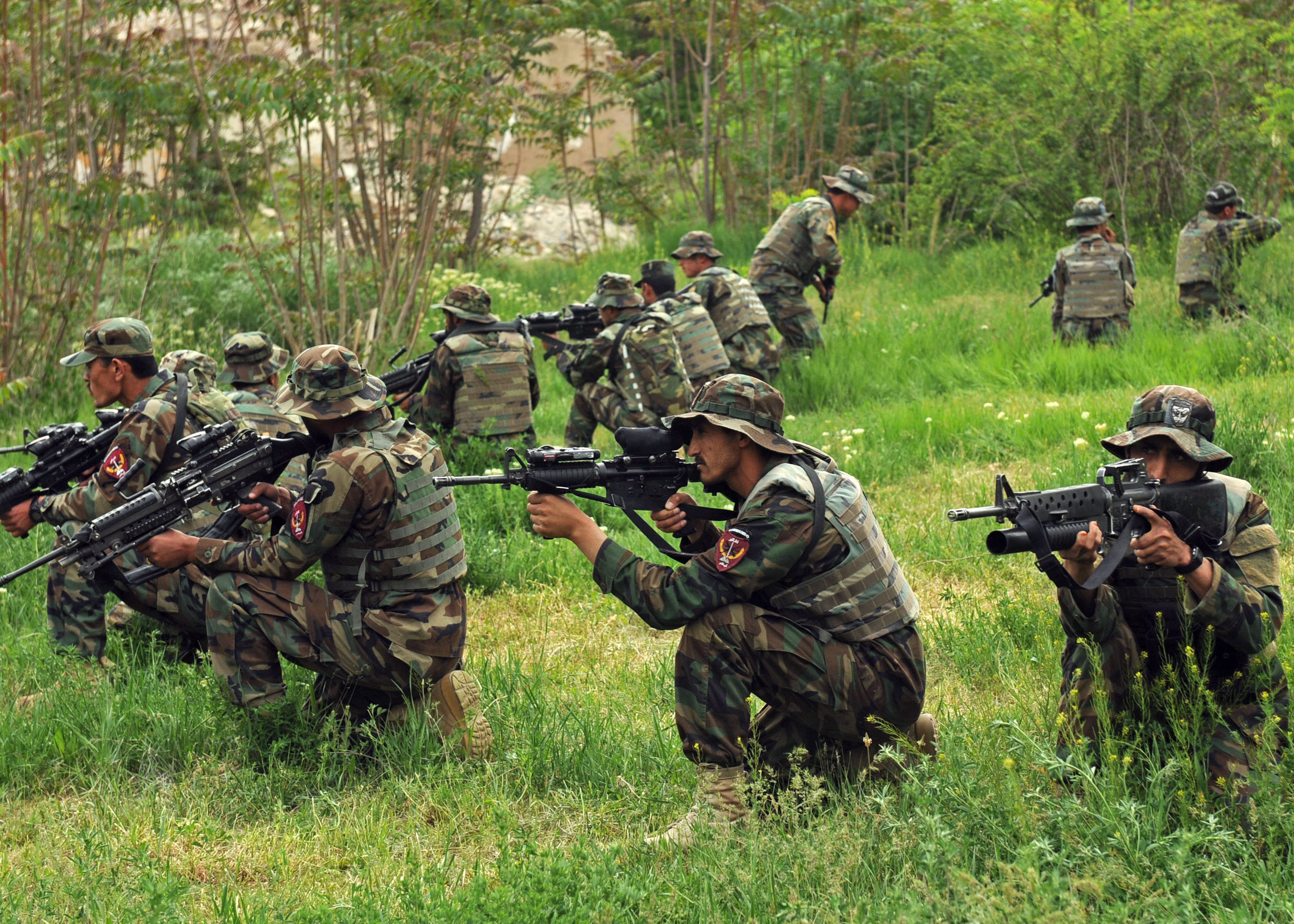
6th Commando Kandak, performing a clearing exercise in Kabul Province.

December 2007: The second ANA Commando Kandak, originally from the 203rd Corps, conducted a series of raids throughout the Sabari district in Afghanistan's Khowst Province, Dec. 27–28, 2007. During the operation, the force arrested a suspected major insurgent facilitator primarily associated with the Hizb-i-Islami Afghanistan terrorist organization and believed to have ties to the Haqqani network terrorist group, the Taliban and Al-Qaeda. The combined Afghan force conducted the two-day operation without a shot being fired.

January 2008: The Third ANA Commando Kandak, originally from the 205th Corps, along with Coalition forces, conducted a four-day operation to disrupt insurgents activity in the volatile Tag Ab Valley of Kapisa Province January 19–23, 2008. The Third Commando Kandak patrolled the Naghlu Reservoir to the village of Jangali in order to disrupt insurgent activities in the center of the valley as the combined force moved north. This operation served as a graduation exercise to providing confidence in the abilities of the newly formed Commando Kandak.

February 2008: The second ANA Commando Kandak (203rd Corps), along with Coalition forces, captured a key insurgent facilitator in Khost Province February 9, 2008. The Ministry of Defense announced that ANA forces captured a known Taliban commander, Nasimulla, during a combined operation in the Dand Faqiran area of Yaqubi District.

February 2008: 1st Toli of the First ANA Commando Kandak (201st), conducted a night air-assault raid in Helmand Province to capture the Taliban leader Mullah Abdul Bari. Bari was one of the top remaining Taliban field commanders able to launch deadly attacks in Helmand and Uruzgan province. He led Taliban operations against the British in northern Helmand province in the Kajaki, Musa Qala, and Baghran districts. Bari was the former governor of Helmand under the Taliban regime.

The operation, named "Say Laab", meaning flood, utilized multiple helicopters and put over 100 commandos onto four separate targets simultaneously. The operation captured 11 combatants as well as destroying six enemy vehicles containing thousands of pounds of weapons and munitions, as well as nearly $8 million of illegal narcotics. Bari and 29 Taliban fighters were killed during the five-hour-long operation. The exact date of the operation wasn't given, but was reported to media by the U.S. Combined Joint Task Force 82 on March 1, 2008.

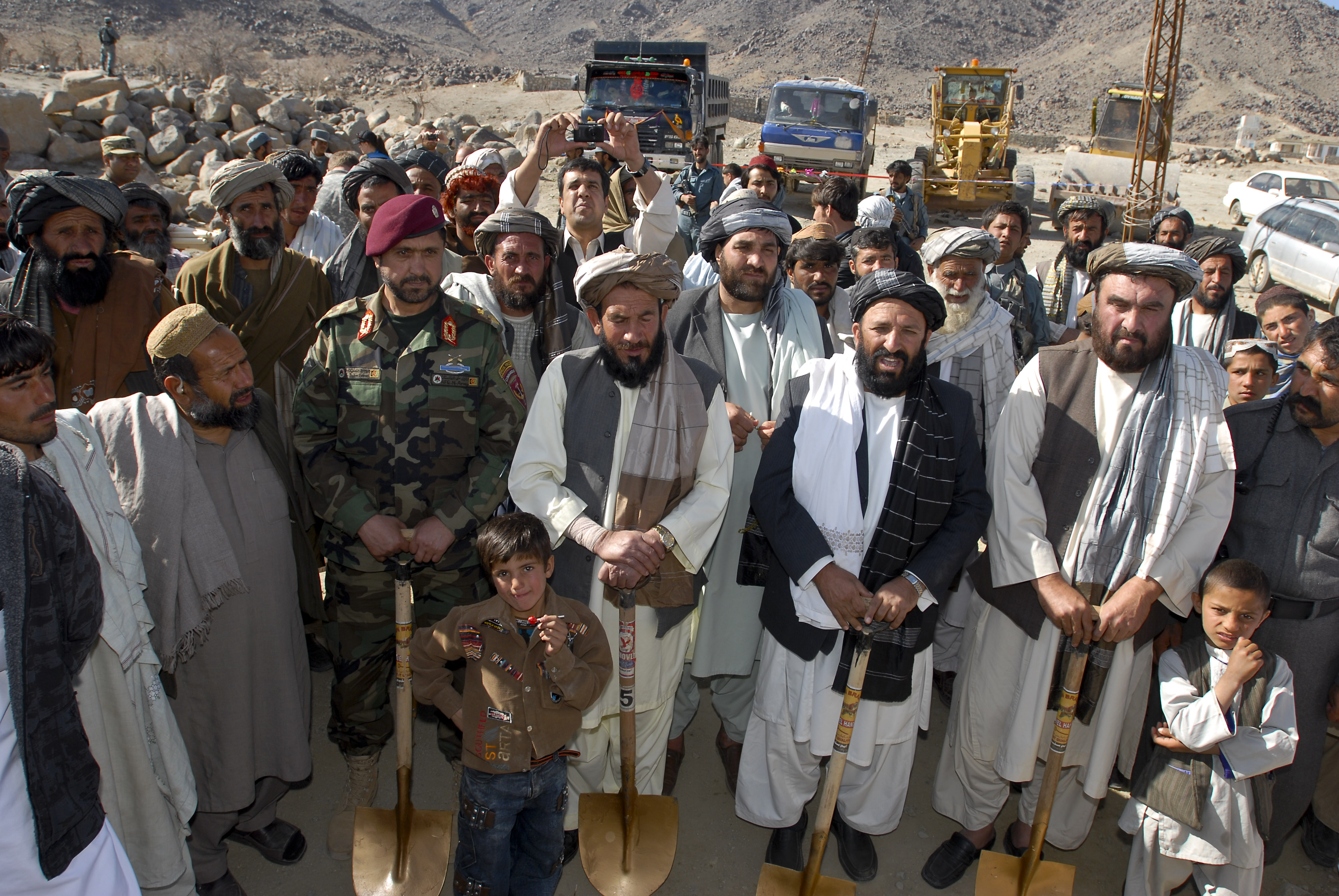
Brig. Gen. Dadan Lawang, commander, 1st Commando Brigade, join local leaders as they prepare to break ground on the repair of Route Highlife during a ceremony March 11, 2011, at the Khakrez District Center in Kandahar Province.

April 2008: one Commando Kandak (unknown designation) conducted operations in Nuristan Province on April 6, reportedly netted several members of the terrorist group Hezb-e-Islami Gulbuddin (HIG). The mission led to a coalition airstrike that, along with the ground fighting, left as many as 20 insurgents dead.

By the end of 2008, the six ANA commando battalions were stationed in the southern region of Afghanistan assisting the Canadian forces.

== Creation of Special Forces ==
A special operations unit was first conceptualized in 2009 and established in 2010.

The first Special Forces team, whose soldiers were selected from the ANA Commandos (this practice was discontinued later to preserve commando capability), finished training in May 2010. The organization was based on the US Army Special Forces. Initially all the Special Forces candidates were planned to come from the Commando Kandak (Commando Battalion), only requiring 10 weeks of training. However, after the initial period it was planned that Special Forces recruiting was to be conducted throughout the Army, and initial Special Forces training was to be 15 weeks. Commando graduates of the special forces course would retain their 'commando' tab and would also have a 'special forces' tab on top of the commando tab in addition to receiving a tan beret. These candidates were normally selected after serving four years as a Commando.

In May 2010 the first class of the ANA Special Forces graduated from their 10-week qualification course and moved on to the operational portion of their training. In November 2010, the ANA Special Forces Class 1 received their tan berets in a ceremony at Camp Morehead after completing 26 weeks of on-the-job training partnered with US Special Forces. The initial selection involved taking the 145 commandos who volunteered, putting them through a one-week qualification process (similar to the one used in the United States), and finding, as in the US, that only about half (69) passed. These Special Forces soldiers formed the first four A-Teams (of 15 men each). Some of the just-graduated special forces soldiers used to help US Special Operations Forces train the 2nd class of candidates. Special Forces were trained to focus on interacting with the population through jirgas with village elders, but capable of unilateral operations. A second ANA Special Forces class completed training in December 2010.

The force numbered 646 Special Forces operators in December 2011. This unit also had female Special Forces operators to interact with female civilians, such as searches, interviews or medical examinations. There were plans to create one Special Forces platoon of just female operators so they could interact with women and children.

The first formation of the 1st Commando Brigade headquarters was dissolved in order to provide personnel for the forming ANA Special Operations Command headquarters. to fill the gap, a new, second, 1st Commando Brigade headquarters staff was established. The 2nd Commando Brigade headquarters was planned to be operational by September 2011. The 1st Special Forces Brigade was also established, modeled on the United States Army Special Forces model. The brigade's missions were planned to include ‘internal defence’ and ‘SOF reconnaissance’ as well as ‘direct action.’

== Establishment of ANA Special Operations Command ==
From mid-2011, the ANA began establishing a full command, the ANA Special Operations Command, to control the ANA Commando Brigade and the ANA Special Forces. In 2011, ANASOC consisted of 7,809 commandos and 646 special forces personnel.

As of April 2012, the reported strength of the Commandos (as opposed to the whole ANASOC) was 8,500 men organized into eight kandaks, as well as one group of 500 Special Operations troops.

In July 2012, the Special Operations Command was officially established as a formation with the status of a division, including a command and staff. Reportedly the command had between 10,000 and 11,000 special operations soldiers by December 2012. Previously this was organised as one brigade with 8 kandaks, all with a minimum of 6 companies. Because the ANASOC had grown to larger than a brigade in size, it was anticipated that it would be split into 3 – 4 brigades, one of which would be a Special Forces Brigade.

An Air Force Special Mission Wing, inaugurated in July 2012, was established to work with ANASOC. A later DOD story said that the unit, the smallest in the Special Security Forces, "was originally established in 2006 as the Afghan Air Interdiction Unit assigned to the Ministry of Interior and re-flagged as the 777th Special Mission Wing." ..The SMW used "Mi-17 helicopters and PC-12 fixed-wing aircraft."

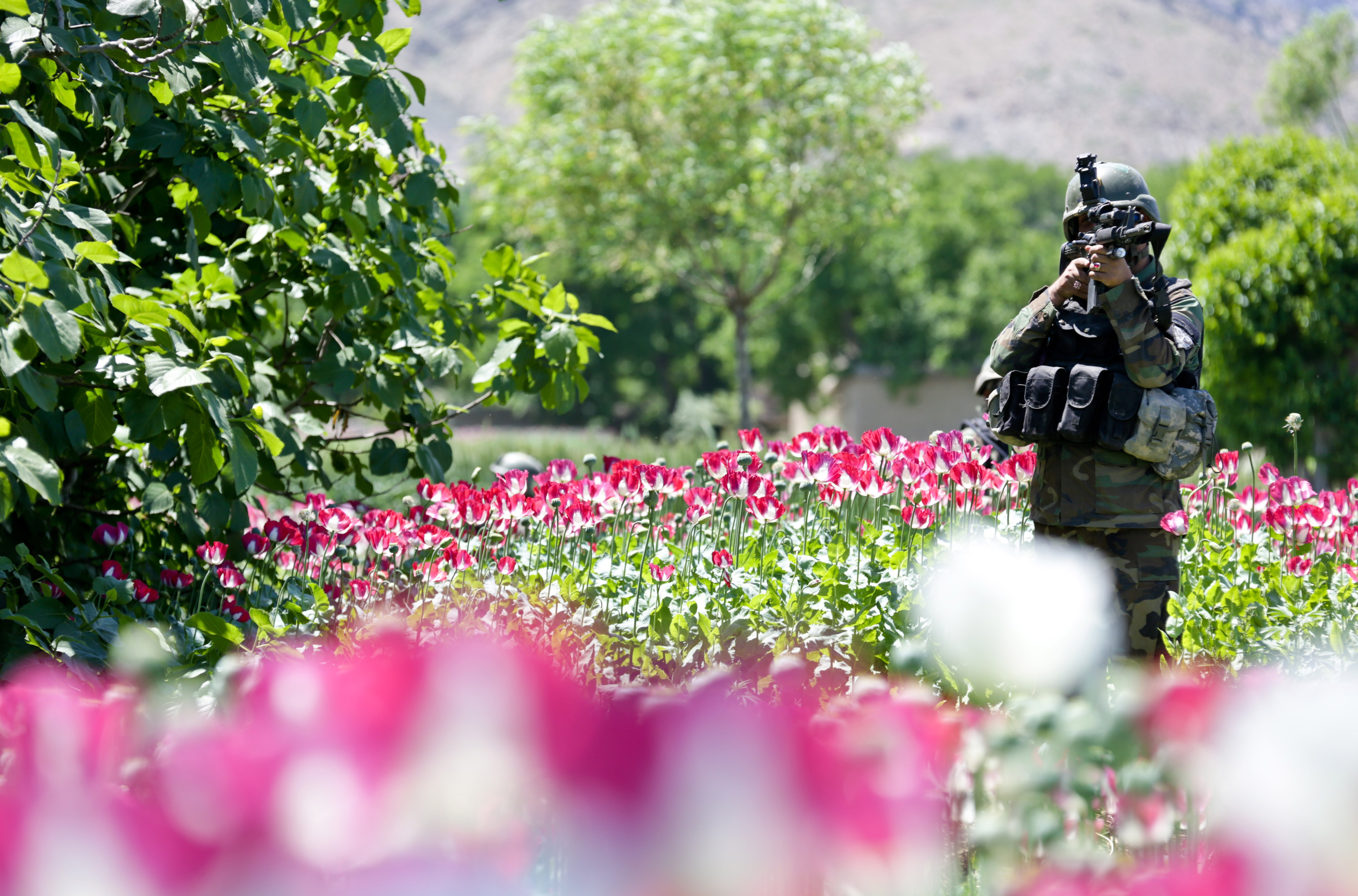
An Afghan National Army Commando with the 3rd Tolai, 1st SOK, patrols through a poppy field during a clearing operation in Khogyani District, Nangarhar Province, on 9 May 2013.

The same month (July 2012), the Afghan commandos conducted their first successful night operation. United States Department of Defense Press Secretary George Little told the media that: "Last night in Afghanistan, US special operations joined Afghan commandos from the first special operations battalion in a full mission exercise demonstrating a night air assault. This was an Afghan plan, an Afghan-led mission. Afghan pilots flew four helicopters during the exercise, which involved more than 50 Afghan commandos, and US special operations forces acting in an advisory capacity. ..[T]he commandos successfully discovered and apprehended a person of interest, recovered weapons and intelligence."

In March 2013, U.S. special forces handed over a base in Nirkh District, Wardak Province to the Afghan commandos. Afghan commandos gradually began taking over the lead from NATO forces the fight against insurgents. In April 2013, Afghan commandos killed 22 insurgents in Nangarhar Province and captured another 10 insurgents. On September 20, 2014, local officials in Ghazni Province reported that Taliban insurgents from different regions of Afghanistan led by camouflaged men wearing black masks captured several villages, set at least 60 homes on fire, killed more than 100 people and beheaded 15 family members of local police officers. The masked insurgents reportedly carried the black flag of the Islamic State, openly called themselves soldiers of Daesh, and did not speak any local languages. Deputy Police Chief, General Asadullah Ensafi, reported that Taliban ambushes stopped reinforcements from the regionally responsible ANA and provincial police from reaching the area. However, Afghan special forces inserted by helicopter were able to reinforce units already defending the area and Ensafi reported that the "immediate threat to [the] district's center had been nullified."

In mid-late 2017 the Afghanistan Analysts Network wrote that the two special operations brigades were:

..made up of four and the other of five Special Operations Kandaks (battalions, SOKs) that were aligned with regional ANA Corps. The US DoD stated in June 2017 that “[t]he SOKs are the primary tactical elements of the ANASOC, and they conduct elite, light-infantry operations against threat networks in support of the regional corps’ counterinsurgency operations and provide a ..response capability against strategic targets.” An additional, separate Special Operations Kandak, the 6th SOK based in Kabul, functioned “as the ANA’s national mission unit,” providing “the President of Afghanistan and the [Chief of General Staff] with a rapidly deployable special operations force able to respond to national-level crises throughout Afghanistan.”

Commandos were used to spearhead challenging fights and were regarded as one of the best units in the region.

The National Mission Brigade was activated on July 31, 2017, and took over command of the 6th Special Operations Kandak and the Ktah Khas. The Ktah Khas was '..often referred to as the Afghan Partner Unit.. a light infantry special operations unit consisting of three companies and support elements.' In addition to the 6th SOK and the Ktah Khas, later reports indicated that two Special Forces Kandaks may have eventually been added.

In August 2017, the New York Times reported that the strength of the Afghan Commandos was 21,000, with an increase to 30,000 as a goal. The same month, General John W. Nicholson Jr., the commander of the Resolute Support Mission, said: "The [commandos] have never lost a battle...The Taliban have never won against the commandos...They never will."

With the December 2017 approval of the Fiscal Year 2018 tashkil (Table of Organisation), ANASOC was authorized a strength of 16,040 personnel, organised into four Special Operations Brigades (SOB) and a National Mission Brigade (NMB). By 2021, there were at least two special operations brigades (1st, 2nd).

At the beginning of January 2021, the Afghan special operations were losing roughly 1,200 people a month, said Lieutenant Colonel Matthew A. Chaney, the commander of 3rd Battalion, 10th Special Forces Group at the time.

== 2021 Taliban offensive ==
In July 2021, during the 2021 Taliban offensive, Turkey agreed to host future training of the Afghan Commandos, and to begin to transport them there for training beginning immediately.

During the Taliban offensive, the Commandos fought tenaciously and were seen as the Afghan military's best-trained and most highly motivated troops. The commandos were deployed on mass across a vast geographical area, however this isolated many units as they were abandoned by other ANA units and locals. In June 2021, 50 commandos managed to recapture Dawlat Abad from the Taliban, however after receiving no reinforcements, commandos were encircled and made a desperate last stand. Those that survived and were captured were executed by the Taliban. "The resulting death of 24 of the country’s most highly trained fighters became a national story—in part because the dead included Major Sohrab Azimi, a well-known special operator—and one that weighed heavily on [Army] morale."

During the 2021 Taliban offensive, 22 Commandos were executed by the Taliban in the Faryab Province after surrendering. While the Taliban were known to show leniency to normal ANA troops, Commandos and Air Force pilots were especially targeted by the Taliban.

Around 500–600 Afghan troops made up mostly of commandos also refused to surrender in Kabul and instead joined up with US forces at Hamid Karzai International Airport, helping them secure the outer perimeter of the airport during the 2021 evacuation from Afghanistan. U.S. Department of Defense spokesman John Kirby said at the time that the United States would evacuate these troops to safety if they wish to leave Afghanistan when the evacuation ended.

Following the fall of Kabul to the Taliban, on August 17, 2021, several ANA commandos were reported to be moving to Panjshir, joining the National Resistance Front of Afghanistan.

Some Afghan commandos were evacuated to the UK. On 1 September 2021, Forbes magazine reported that the United Kingdom was contemplating recruiting such evacuated commandos into the British Army.

In October 2022, the Russian armed forces reportedly started to recruit ex-Afghan commandos to Ukraine. An interview with Major General Kyrylo Budanov confirms sightings of ex-Afghan commandos deployed in Ukraine. In November that same year, it was reported that Iran was also recruiting former commandos for use in Yemen, primarily those who had fled into Iran during the 2021 Taliban offensive.

== Bibliography ==
- Giustozzi, Antonio (2015). The Army of Afghanistan: A Political History of a Fragile Institution. London: C. Hurst & Co. ISBN 978-1-84904-481-3. 288 pp.; £35.00.
- Grau, Lester W.; Jalali, Ali Ahmad (2001). "The Campaign for the Caves:The battles for Zhawar in the Soviet-Afghan war". Journal of Slavic Military Studies. 14 (3): 69–92. doi:10.1080/13518040108430488. S2CID 144936749.
- Isby, David (1986). Russia's War in Afghanistan. Osprey Publishing. ISBN 978-0-85045-691-2.
- rs.nato.int (2017-08-05). "NATO Resolute Support | New Afghan special operations unit will bolster national security". rs.nato.int. Archived from the original on 2019-10-12.
- Neville, Leigh (2019). The Elite: The A–Z of Modern Special Operations Forces. Oxford: Osprey Publishing. ISBN 978-1472824295.
- Special Inspector General for Afghanistan Reconstruction, "Afghan Special Mission Wing: DoD Moving Forward with $771.8 Million Purchase of Aircraft that the Afghans Cannot Operate and Maintain," SIGAR Audit 13-13, June 2013. Qualified Afghan personnel and equipment maintenance were short, and the divided Ministry of Defence - Ministry of the Interior organisation presented problems, potentially jeopardizing $771.8 million in planned but not-yet-arrived U.S.-funded aircraft. The SIG called for the suspension of contracts awarded for the new aircraft until a memorandum of understanding was signed between the Ministry of the Interior and the Ministry of Defence.
