= Rish Khor camp =

Camp in Afghanistan

Coordinates: 34°43′14″N 69°13′56″E

Rish Khor camp is a military facility located near Kabul, the capital of Afghanistan.

== History ==
After the 1978 Communist seizure of power, Rish Khor camp was the site of a revolt in October 1979:

A severe battle occurred at Rishkor, just a few kilometers southwest of the capital. The garrison revolted. Bhasin describes the battle from accounts by eyewitnesses: "There were several hundred casualties in hours of heavy fighting in the Rishkor Division. During the battle which lasted from 14 October to the afternoon of 15 October, the government brought in its tanks, mortars, modern Soviet Mi-24 assault helicopters and bombers."

The 444th Commando Regiment was also involved in the suppression of the mutiny.

When the Pakistan Inter-Services Intelligence began their planning to orchestrate Mujaheddin attacks on the Soviet Army, they had among their military targets Rishkoor garrison with "the headquarters of both the Afghan 7th Division and 37th Commando Brigade, plus the 88th Artillery Brigade."

By July 1981 the division headquarters of the 7th Infantry Division had been relocated from Rishkoor to Moqor.

During Soviet occupation it was a Soviet Airborne Troops base.

In 1994, troops of Gulbuddin Hekmatyar's Hizb-i Islami and Commander Zardad operated from this base.

In 1998, under Taliban rule, the place hosted an Al-Qaida training camp for militants from various groups including Harkat-ul-Mujahideen and was said to be Osama bin Laden's 'University of Terror'.

In 2000, BBC's Kate Clark visited the base and found it 'deserted'.

In late 2001, America dropped bombs on this camp for seven nights in a row and obliterated it. Later U.S. special forces raided it and found 'detailed information about chemical, biological and nuclear weapons'.

In 2007, Camp Morehead, a Commando Training Center was established here which serves as the principal site for training the Afghan National Army Commando Corps. The training center was named after a United States Army 5th Special Forces Group soldier, Master Sergeant Kevin Morehead, who was killed in Iraq in September 2003. The camp is reported to house the Rish Khor prison, a secret U.S. detention facility.

In October 2016, an attacker wearing a military uniform killed two people near the site.
