= Operation Commando Fury =

- Part of the War in Afghanistan (2001–2021)
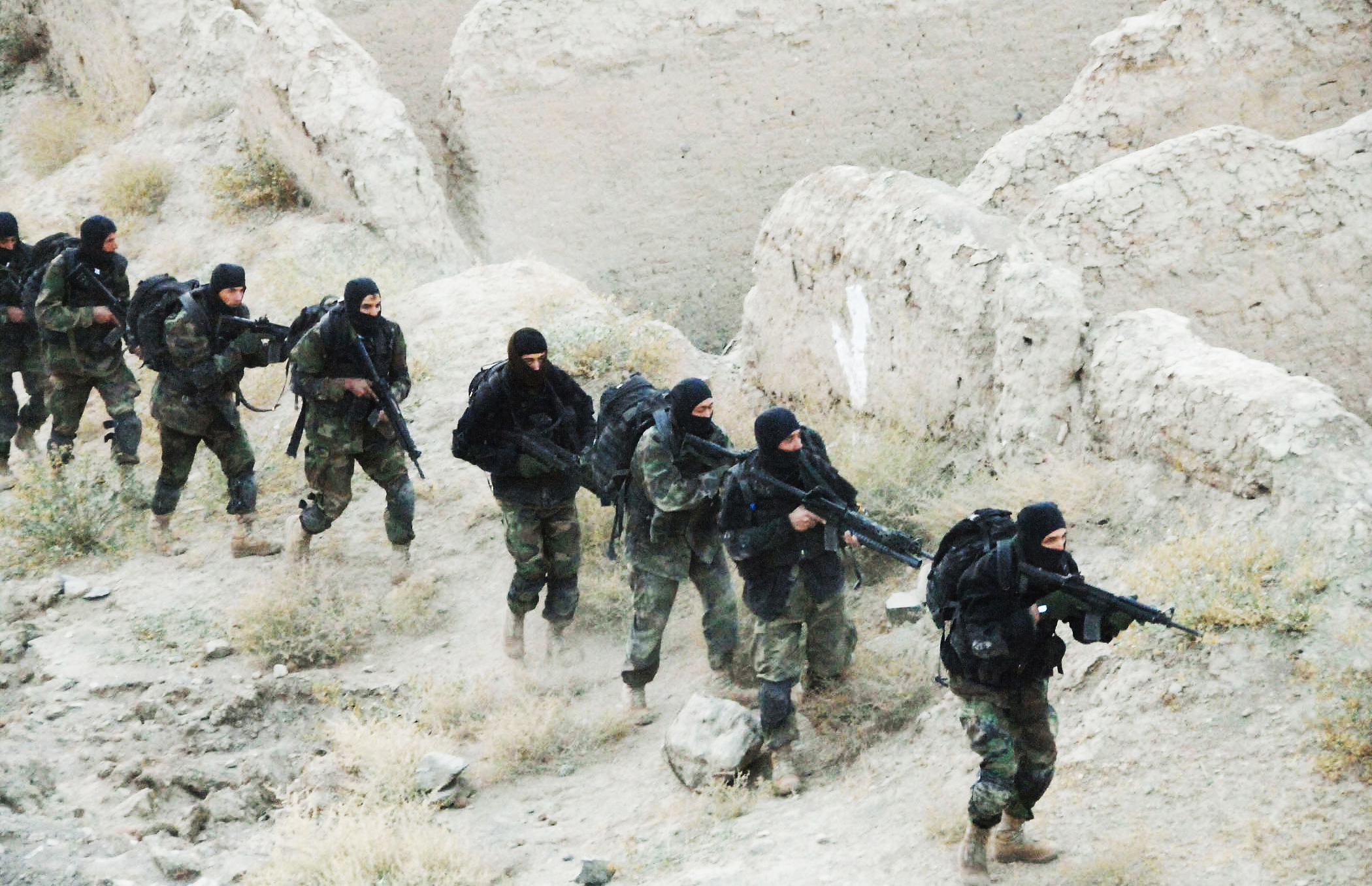
- Afghan commandos secure a compound during Operation Commando Fury.
Date	November 10–14, 2007
Location	Tagab Valley, Kapisa Province, Afghanistan
Result	Coalition victory

Belligerents
(Islamic Republic of Afghanistan) Government of Afghanistan; Afghan National Army; Afghan National Police; NATO; ISAF	Taliban

Strength
More than 30 commandos, ~30 army and police vehicles, 5 helicopters, air support	Unknown

Casualties and losses
None	6 dead, 6 captured

Operation Commando Fury was a four-day Afghan military operation against the Taliban in the Kapisa Province. Six insurgents were killed and six others were captured.

== Events of the operation ==
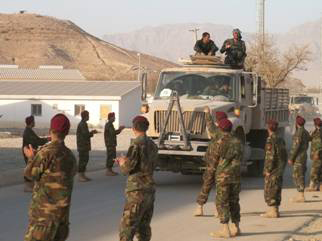
Afghan soldiers returning to base after the operation.

At dawn on November 10, 2007, thirty commandos from the Afghan 3rd Company, 1st Commando Kandak conducted an air assault raid from five Coalition helicopters on a Taliban compound in Mollakheyl village. The commandos captured six insurgents inside of the compound. After securing the compound, the commandos were besieged by insurgents. Utilizing snipers and Coalition close air support, they were able to break out of the compound and continue the operation.

The Afghan National Army and Afghan National Police assisted the commandos during this operation. They cut off the Taliban's retreat and secured other villages.

No Afghan, Coalition, or civilian casualties were reported, and the operation is considered a success because it broke the Taliban's grip in the Tagab Valley.
