= Mohammad Farid Ahmadi =

Afghan army officer

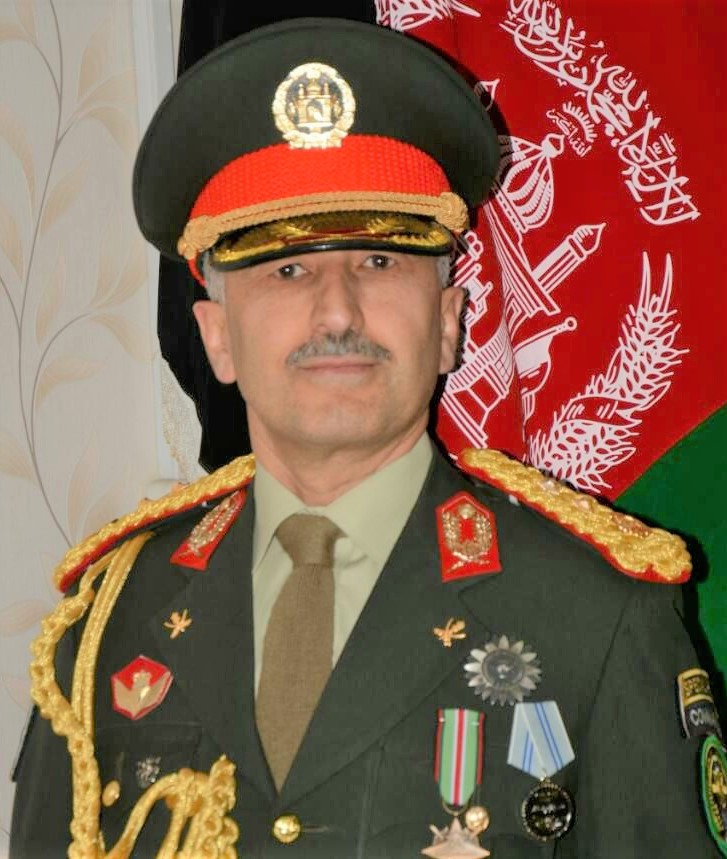
- Born: Baghlan, Afghanistan
- Allegiance: Afghanistan
- Branch: Afghan National Army
- Service years: 1991–2021
- Rank: Lieutenant general
- Commands: ANA Special Operations Command; 1st Commando Battalion
- Conflicts: Afghan conflict; War in Afghanistan (2001–2021)

Mohammad Farid Ahmadi is an Afghan army officer who was Commander of the Afghan National Army Special Operations Corps from May 2019 to January 2021, formerly being part of the Afghan Commando Forces in 1991.

Ahmadi joined the Afghan Army in April 1991. He attended the United States Army Command and General Staff College and King's College London.

Military offices
Preceded by Bismillah Waziri	Commander of the ANA Special Operations Command; 2019–2021	Succeeded by Haibatullah Alizai
