= Military ranks of Afghanistan =

The military ranks of Afghanistan were the military insignia used by militaries of Afghanistan throughout history.

== Current ranks ==
Following the return of the Taliban into power, the Armed Forces of the Islamic Emirate of Afghanistan continue to use the rank insignia of the Islamic Republic Armed Forces. As of 2024, they have made alterations to the rank insignia of the former Afghan Army, replacing the coat of arms of the Islamic Republic with that of the Islamic Emirate.

=== Commissioned officer ranks ===
The rank insignia of commissioned officers.

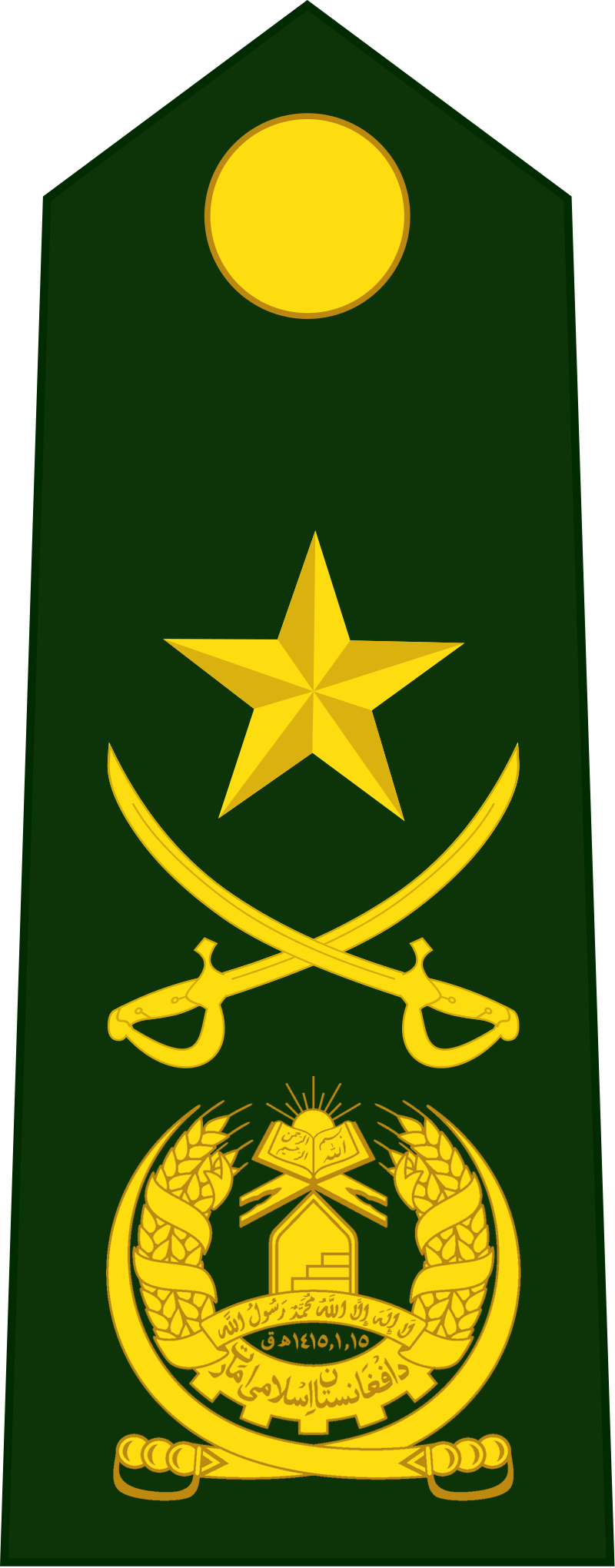
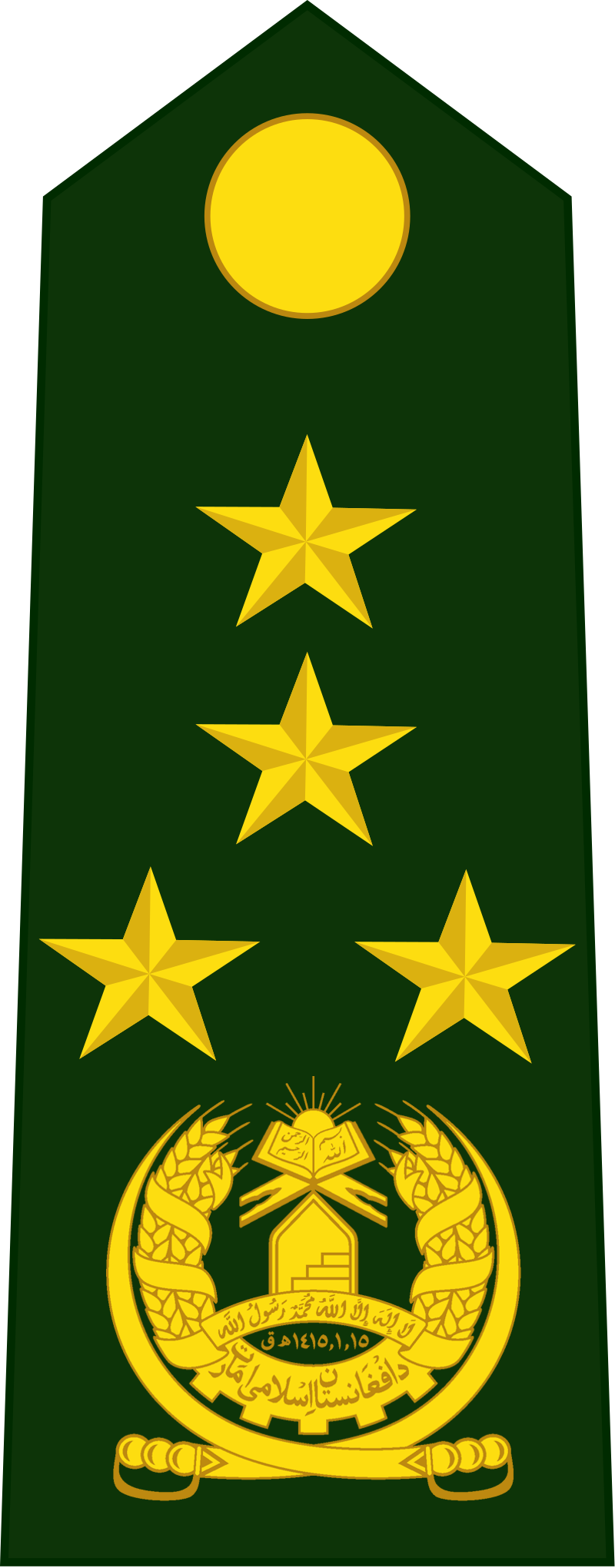
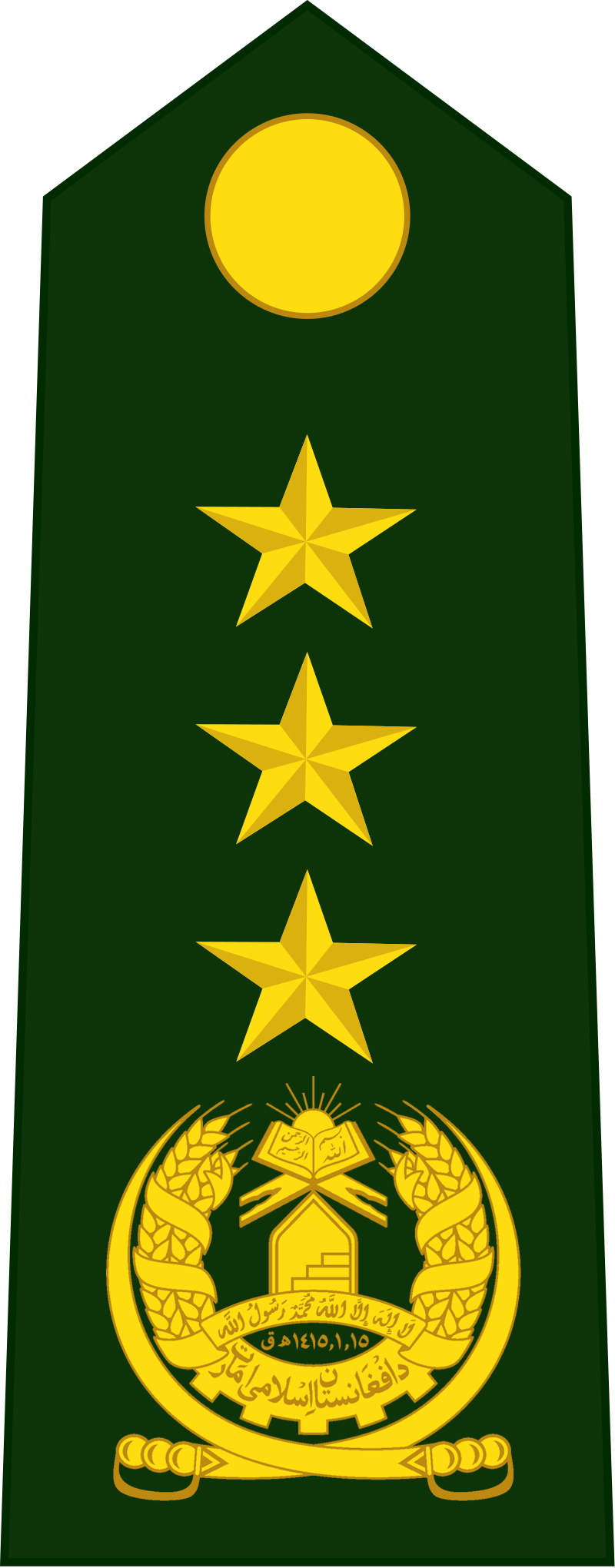
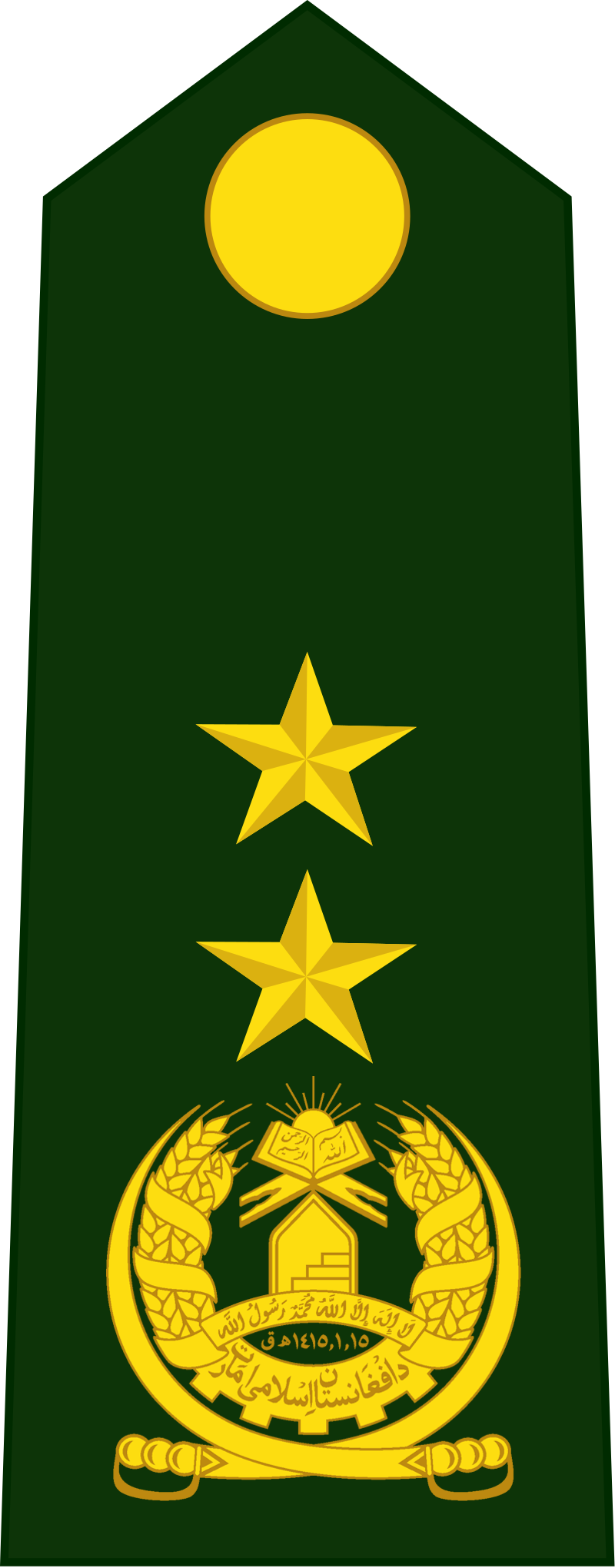
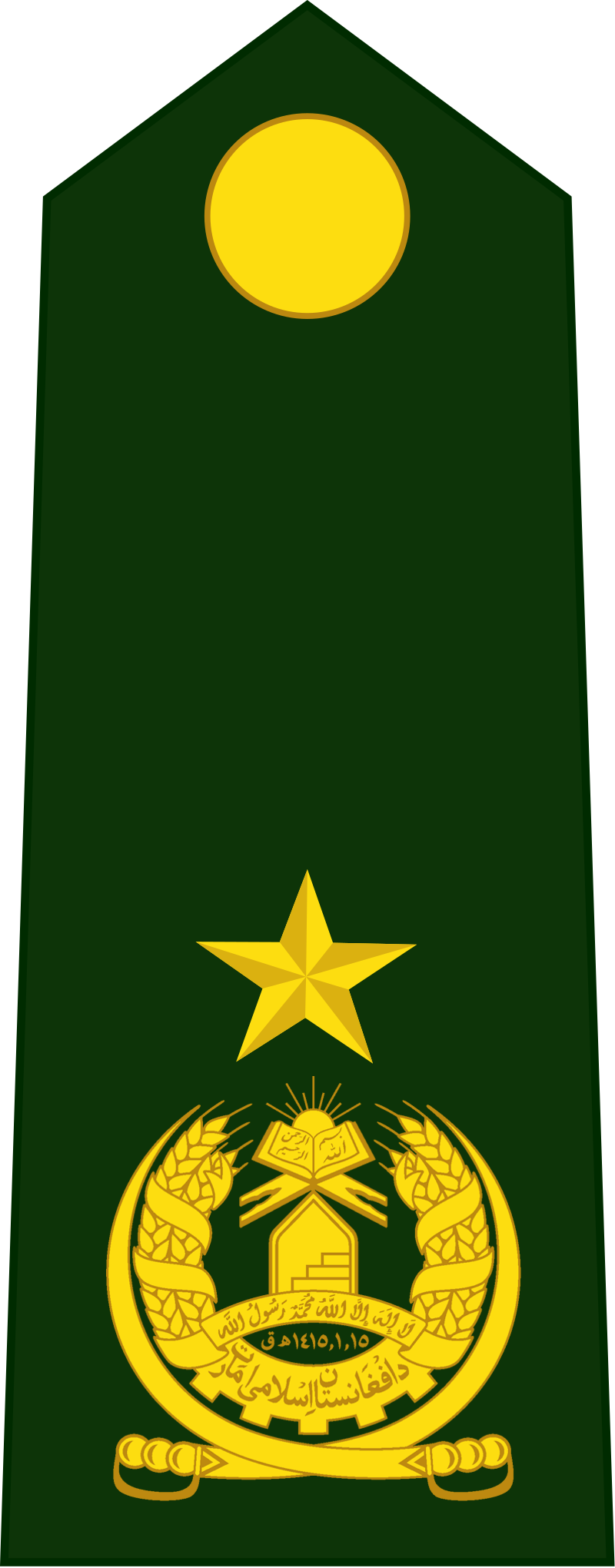
Rank group	General / flag officers					Senior officers			Junior officers
Islamic National Army
Islamic National Army	مارشال; Marshal	ستر جنرال; Setar jenral	ډگرجنرال; Dagar jenral	تورن جنرال; Turan jenral	برید جنرال; Brid jenral	ډگروال; Dagarwal	ډگرمن; Dagarman	جگرن; Jagran	جگتورن; Jag turan	تورن; Turan	لمړی بريدمن; Lomri baridman	دوهم بریدمن; Dvahomi baridman	دریم بریدمن; Dreyom baridman
Afghan Air Force
Afghan Air Force	مارشال; Marshal	ستر جنرال; Setar jenral	ډگرجنرال; Dagar jenral	تورن جنرال; Turan jenral	برید جنرال; Brid jenral	ډگروال; Dagarwal	ډگرمن; Dagarman	جگرن; Jagran	جگتورن; Jag turan	تورن; Turan	لمړی بريدمن; Lomri baridman	دوهم بریدمن; Dvahomi baridman	دریم بریدمن; Dreyom baridman
Rank group	General / flag officers					Senior officers			Junior officers

=== Other ranks ===
The rank insignia of non-commissioned officers and enlisted personnel.

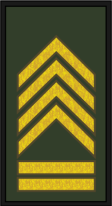
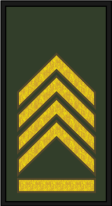
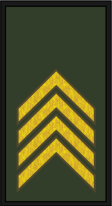
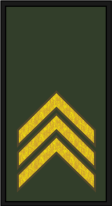
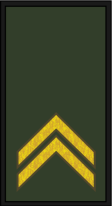
Rank group	Senior NCOs			Junior NCOs	Enlisted
Islamic National Army						No insignia
Islamic National Army	سرپرگمشر قدمدار; Serebergemser qadamdar	معاون سرپرگمشر قدمدار; Maawan serebergemser qadamdar	سرپرگمشر; Serebergemser	معاون سرپرگمشر; Maawan sarpargamshar	پرگمشر; Pregmesher	جندي; Jondi
Afghan Air Force
Afghan Air Force	سرپرگمشر قدمدار; Serebergemser qadamdar	معاون سرپرگمشر قدمدار; Maawan serebergemser qadamdar	سرپرگمشر; Serebergemser	معاون سرپرگمشر; Maawan sarpargamshar	پرگمشر; Pregmesher	جندي; Jondi
Rank group	Senior NCOs			Junior NCOs	Enlisted

== Historic ranks ==
=== Kingdom of Afghanistan (1960–1974) ===
Commissioned officer ranks

The rank insignia of commissioned officers.

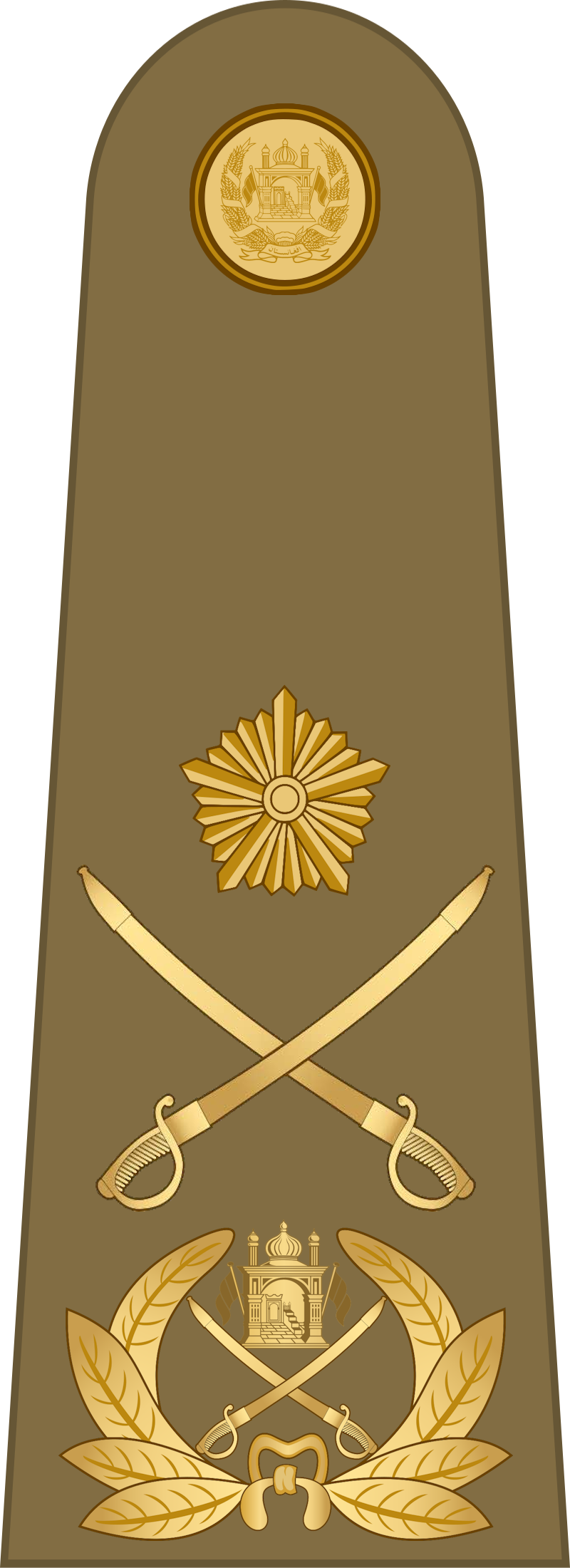
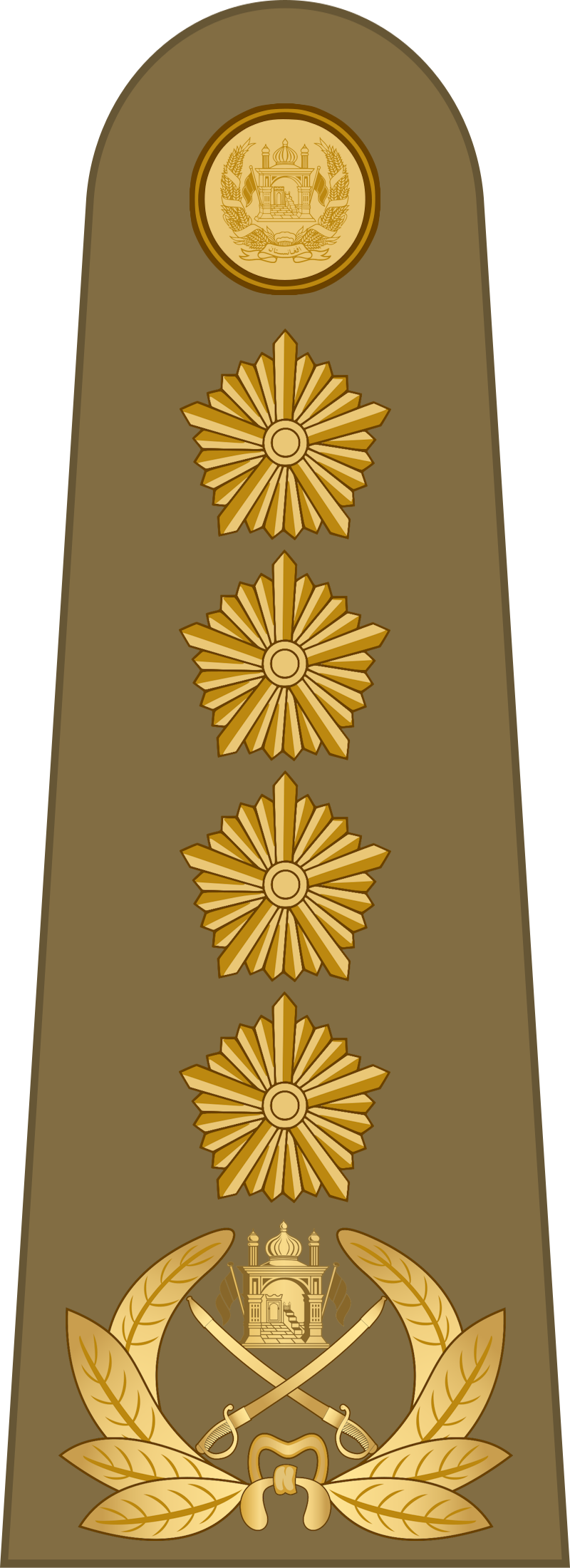
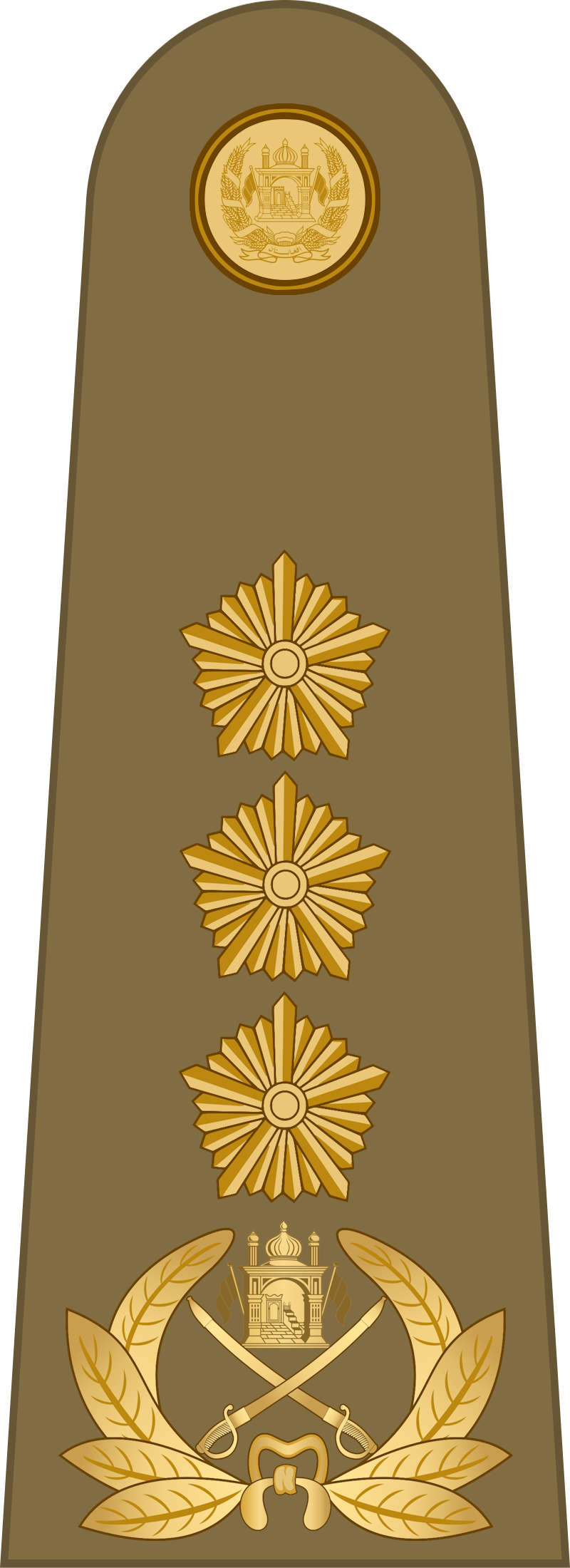
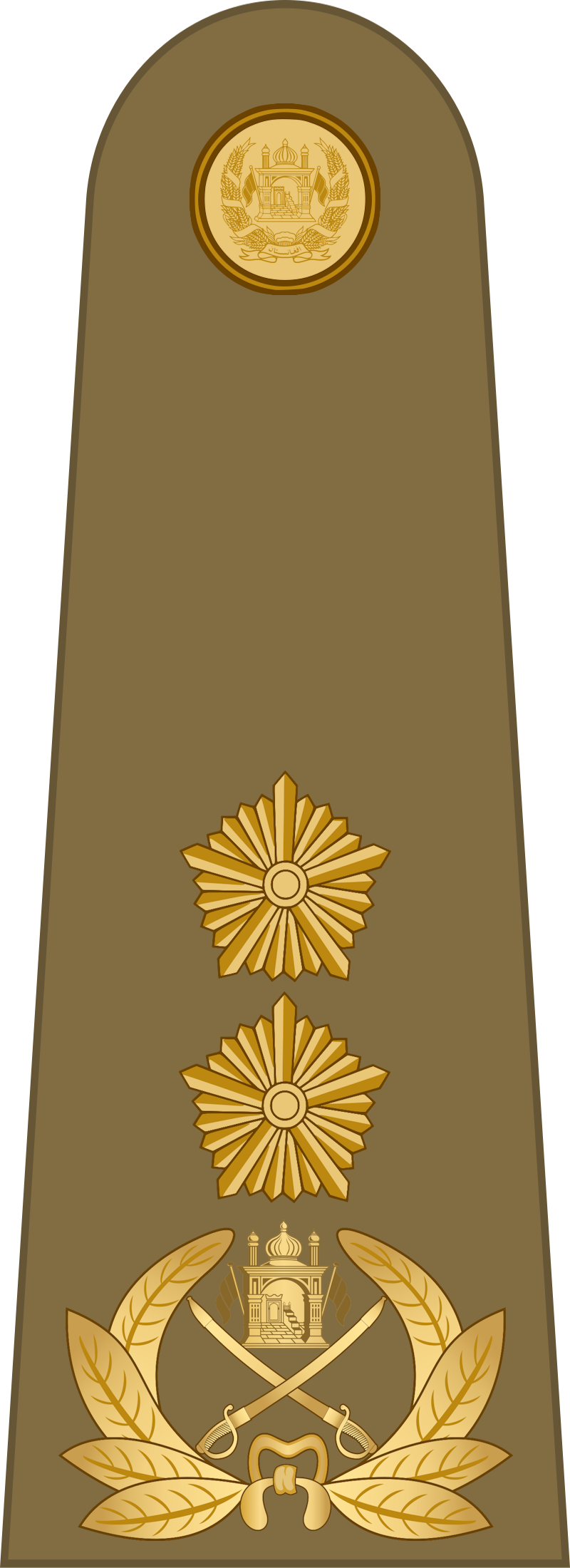
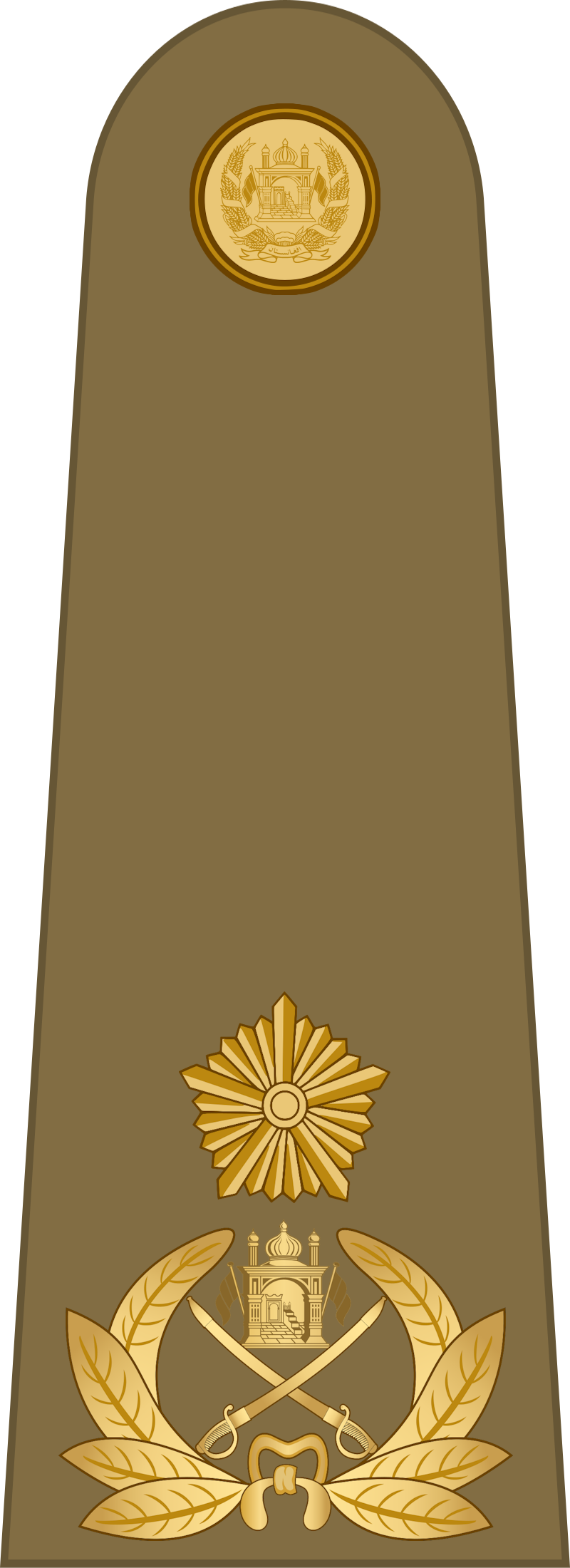
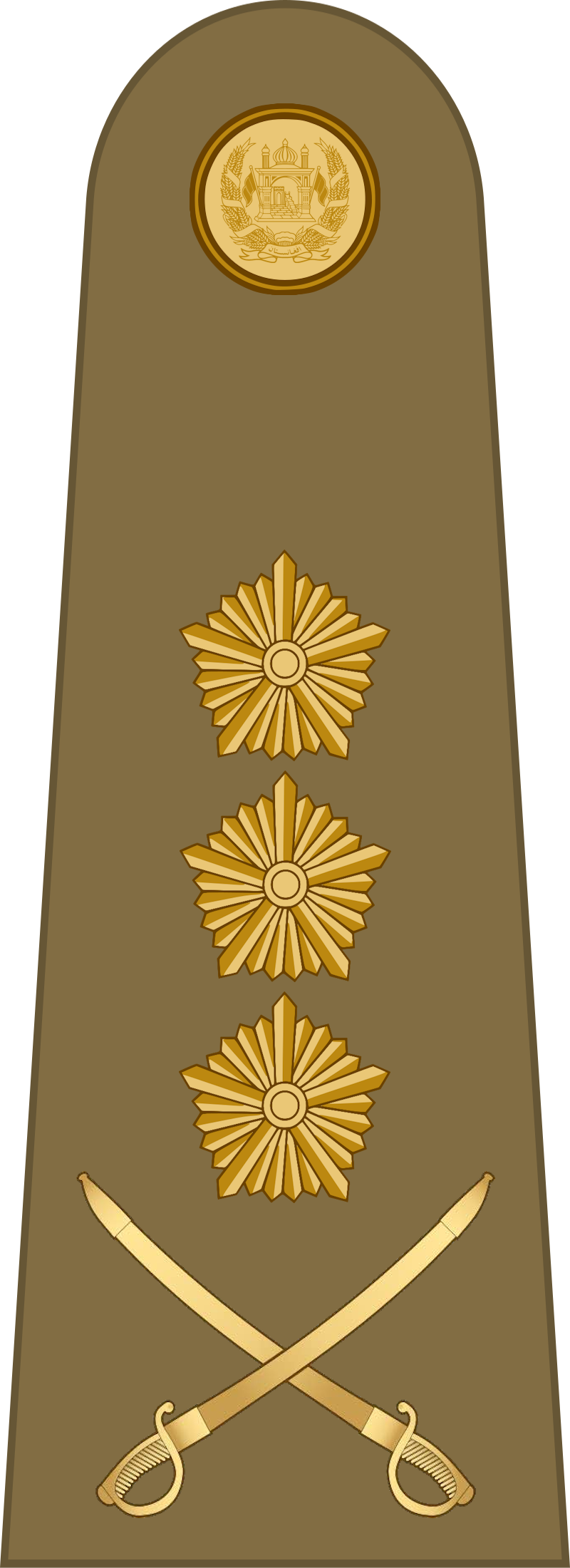
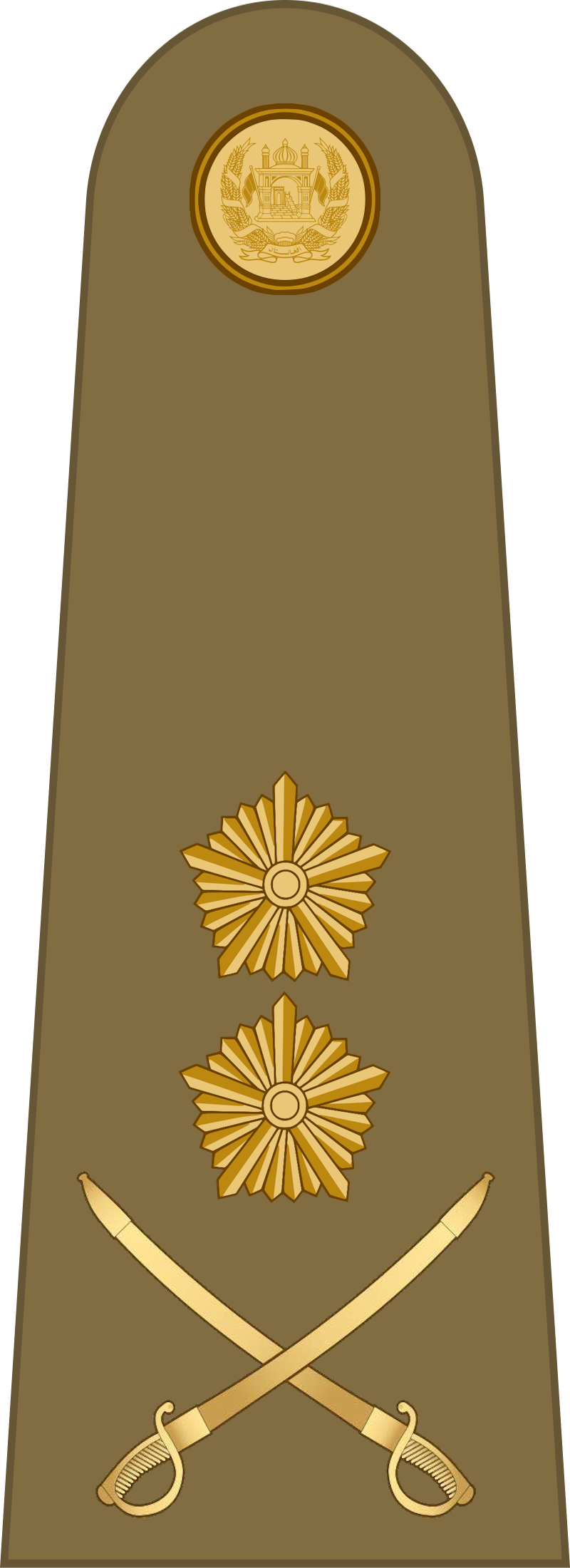
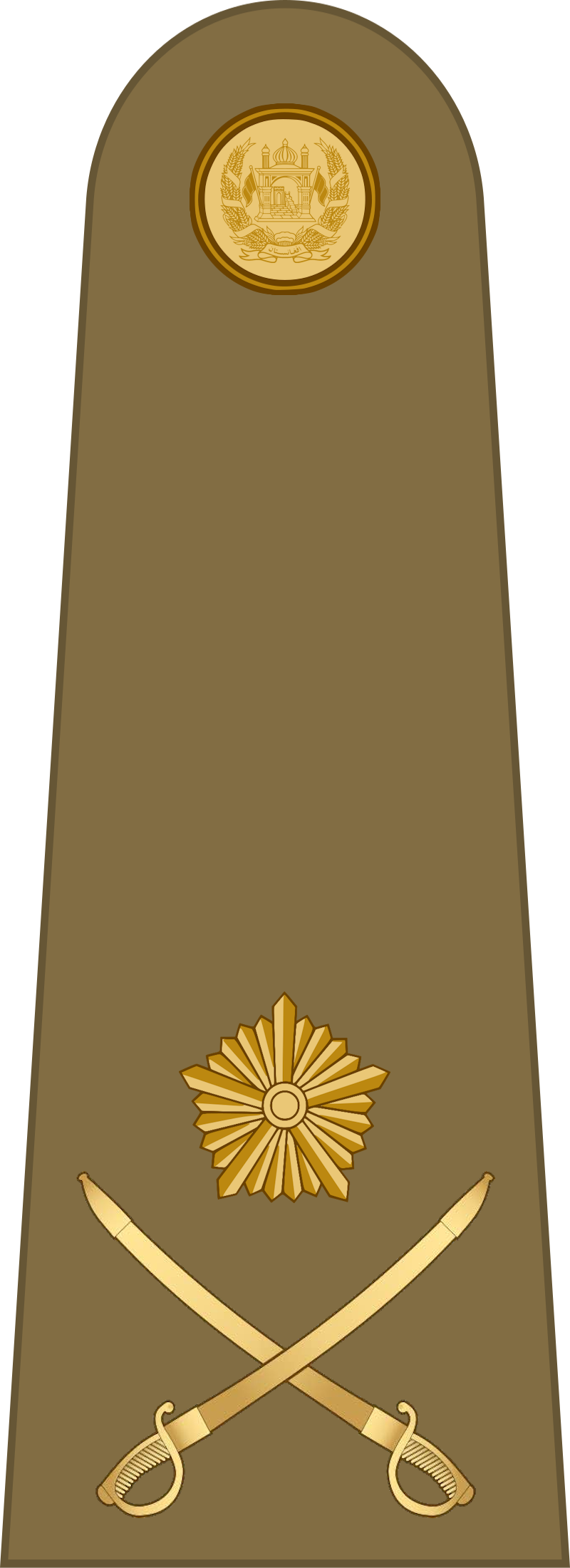
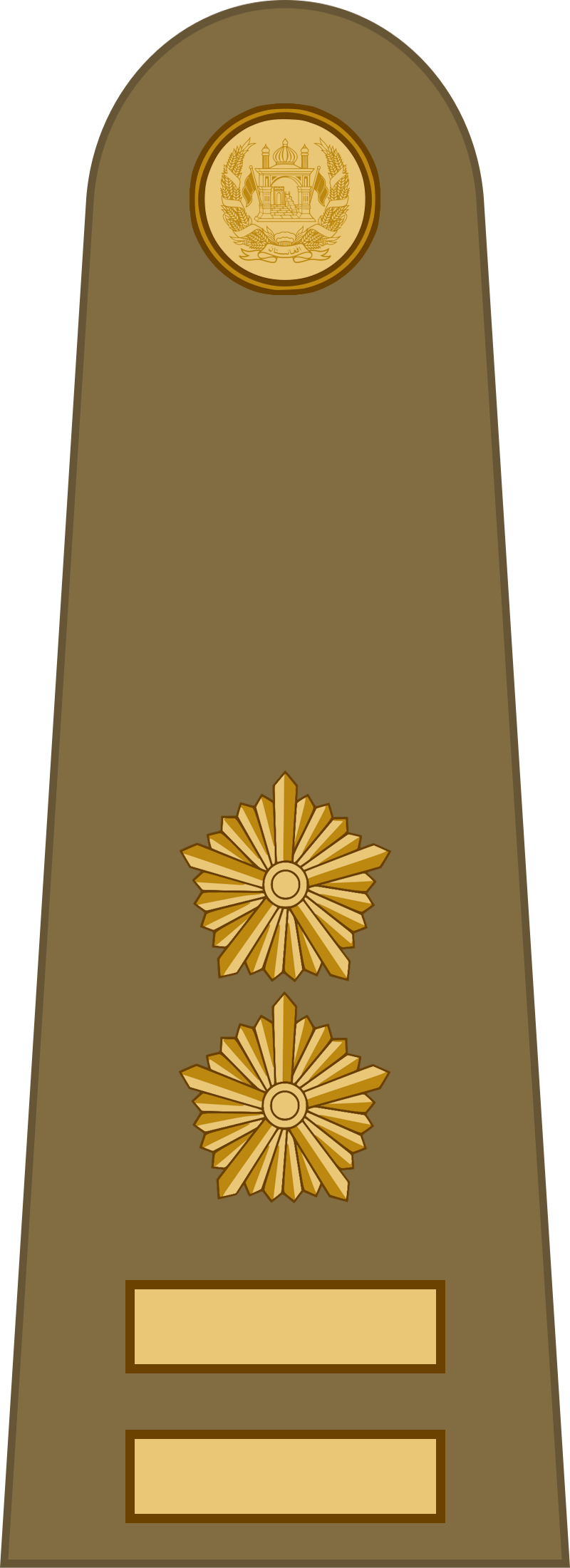
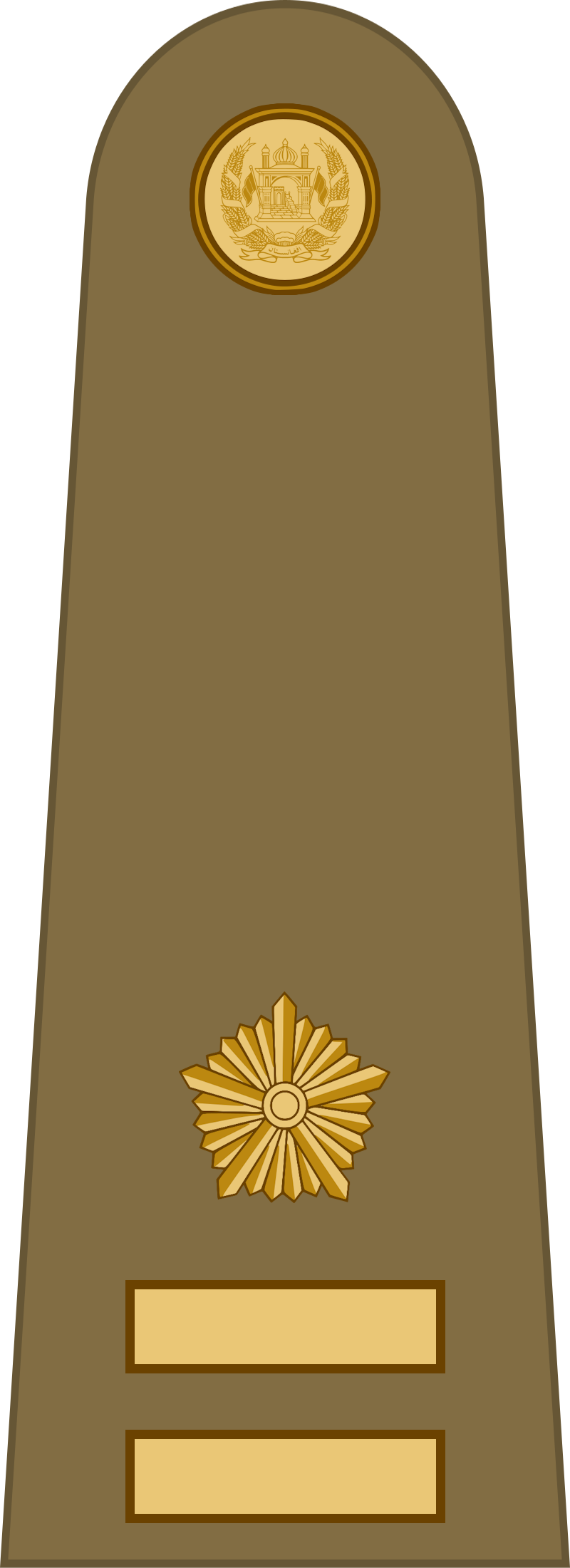
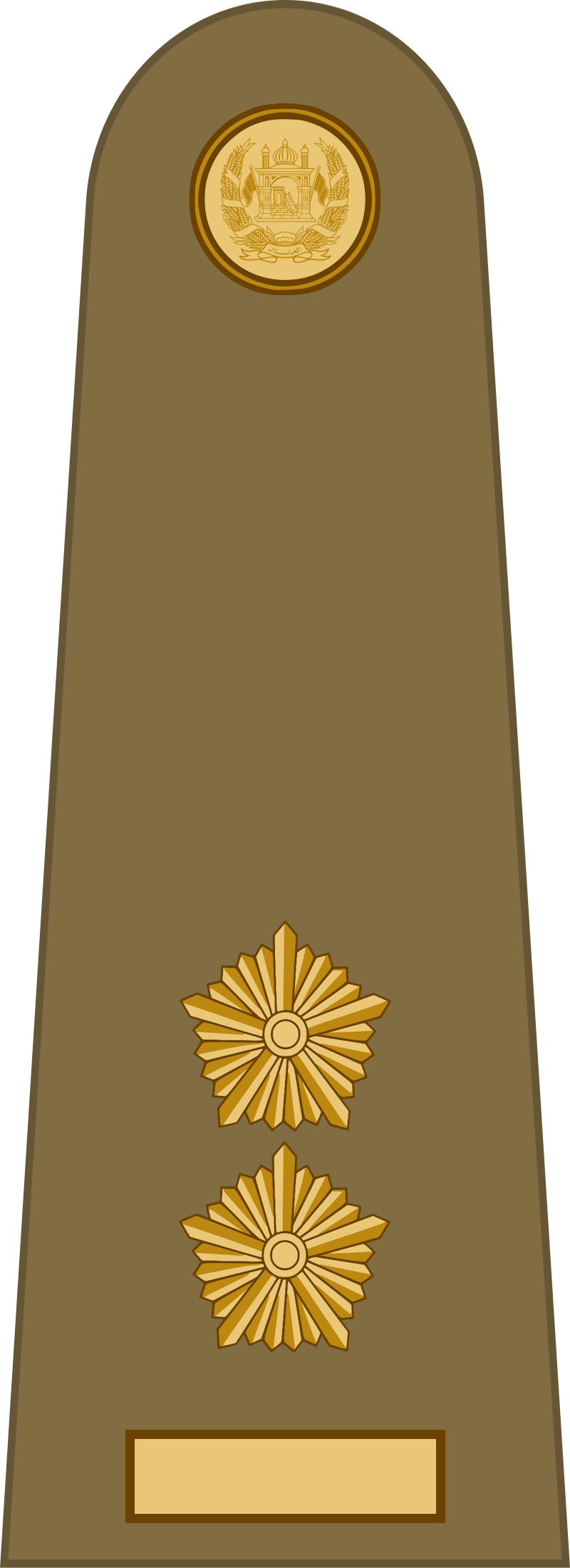
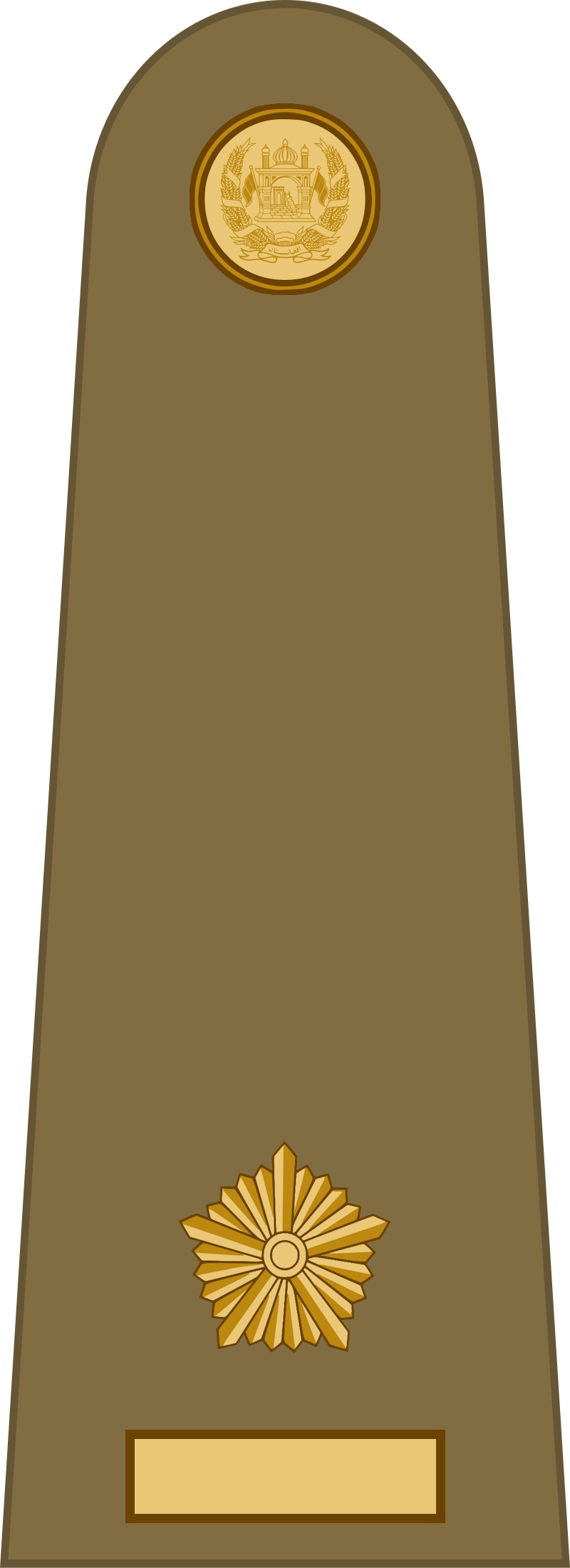
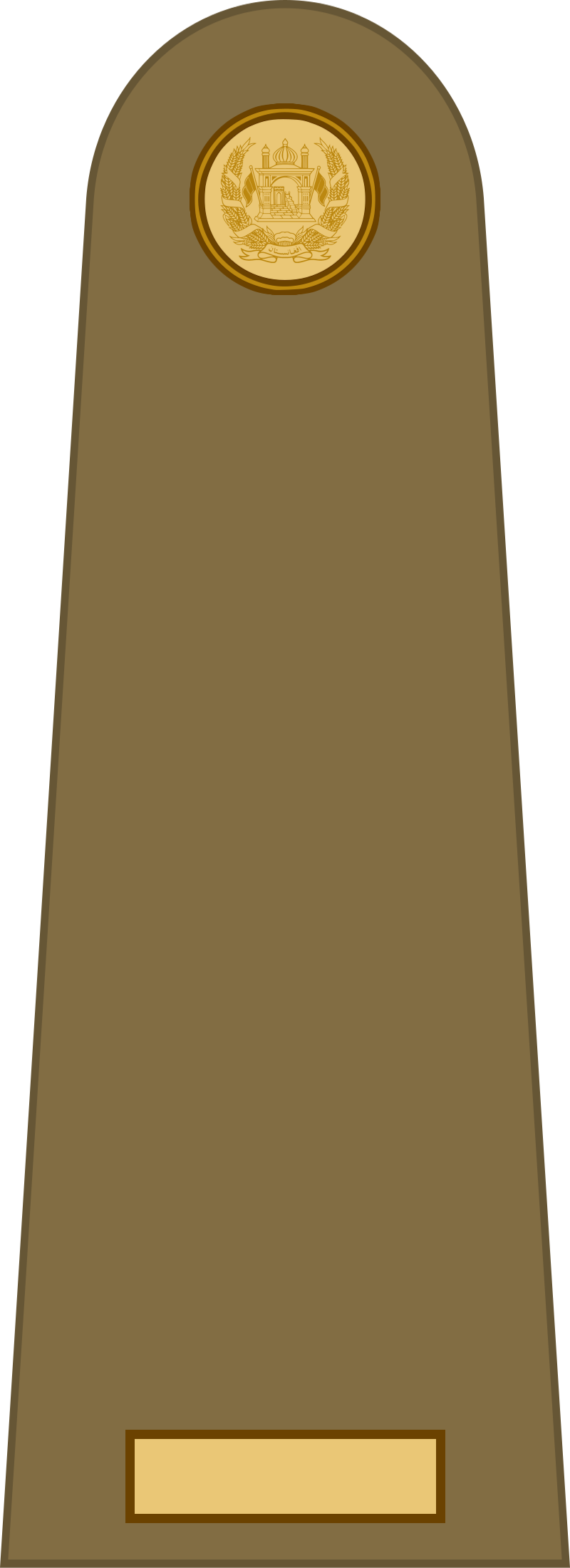
Rank group	General / flag officers					Senior officers			Junior officers
Royal Afghan Army
Royal Afghan Army	مارشال; Marshal	ستر جنرال; Setar jenral	ډگرجنرال; Dagar jenral	تورن جنرال; Turan jenral	برید جنرال; Brid jenral	ډگروال; Dagarwal	ډگرمن; Dagarman	جگرن; Jagran	جگتورن; Jag turan	تورن; Turan	لمړی بريدمن; Lomri baridman	دوهم بریدمن; Dvahomi baridman	دریم بریدمن; Dreyom baridman

=== Republic of Afghanistan (1987–1992) ===
Commissioned officer ranks

The rank insignia of commissioned officers.

Rank group	General / flag officers					Senior officers			Junior officers
Republic of Afghanistan Army
Republic of Afghanistan Army	مارشال; Marshal	ستر جنرال; Setar jenral	ډگرجنرال; Dagar jenral	تورن جنرال; Turan jenral	برید جنرال; Brid jenral	ډگروال; Dagarwal	ډگرمن; Dagarman	جگرن; Jagran	جگتورن; Jag turan	تورن; Turan	لمړی بريدمن; Lomri baridman	دوهم بریدمن; Dvahomi baridman	دریم بریدمن; Dreyom baridman

Other ranks

The rank insignia of non-commissioned officers and enlisted personnel.

Rank group	Senior NCOs			Junior NCOs	Enlisted
Republic of Afghanistan Army						No insignia
Republic of Afghanistan Army	کرور; Krur	لوئی برش; Loi bresh	جیک برش; Jak bresh	برش; Bresh	بریش یار; Bresh yar	جندي; Jondi

=== Islamic Republic of Afghanistan (2004–2021) ===
Commissioned officer ranks

The rank insignia of commissioned officers.

Rank group	General / flag officers					Senior officers			Junior officers
(Islamic Republic of Afghanistan) Afghan National Army
(Islamic Republic of Afghanistan) Afghan National Army	مارشال; Marshal	ستر جنرال; Setar jenral	ډگرجنرال; Dagar jenral	تورن جنرال; Turan jenral	برید جنرال; Brid jenral	ډگروال; Dagarwal	ډگرمن; Dagarman	جگرن; Jagran	جگتورن; Jag turan	تورن; Turan	لمړی بريدمن; Lomri baridman	دوهم بریدمن; Dvahomi baridman	دریم بریدمن; Dreyom baridman
(Islamic Republic of Afghanistan) Afghan Air Force
(Islamic Republic of Afghanistan) Afghan Air Force	مارشال; Marshal	ستر جنرال; Setar jenral	ډگرجنرال; Dagar jenral	تورن جنرال; Turan jenral	برید جنرال; Brid jenral	ډگروال; Dagarwal	ډگرمن; Dagarman	جگرن; Jagran	جگتورن; Jag turan	تورن; Turan	لمړی بريدمن; Lomri baridman	دوهم بریدمن; Dvahomi baridman	دریم بریدمن; Dreyom baridman
Rank group	General / flag officers					Senior officers			Junior officers

Other ranks

The rank insignia of non-commissioned officers and enlisted personnel.

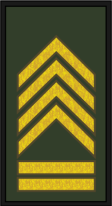
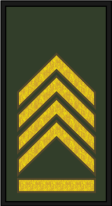
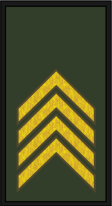
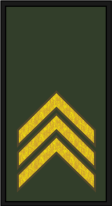
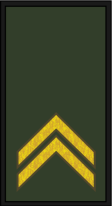
Rank group	Senior NCOs			Junior NCOs	Enlisted
(Islamic Republic of Afghanistan) Afghan National Army						No insignia
(Islamic Republic of Afghanistan) Afghan National Army	سرپرگمشر قدمدار; Serebergemser qadamdar	معاون سرپرگمشر قدمدار; Maawan serebergemser qadamdar	سرپرگمشر; Serebergemser	معاون سرپرگمشر; Maawan sarpargamshar	پرگمشر; Pregmesher	جندي; Jondi
(Islamic Republic of Afghanistan) Afghan Air Force
(Islamic Republic of Afghanistan) Afghan Air Force	سرپرگمشر قدمدار; Serebergemser qadamdar	معاون سرپرگمشر قدمدار; Maawan serebergemser qadamdar	سرپرگمشر; Serebergemser	معاون سرپرگمشر; Maawan sarpargamshar	پرگمشر; Pregmesher	جندي; Jondi
Rank group	Senior NCOs			Junior NCOs	Enlisted
